= List of Southampton F.C. players (1–24 appearances) =

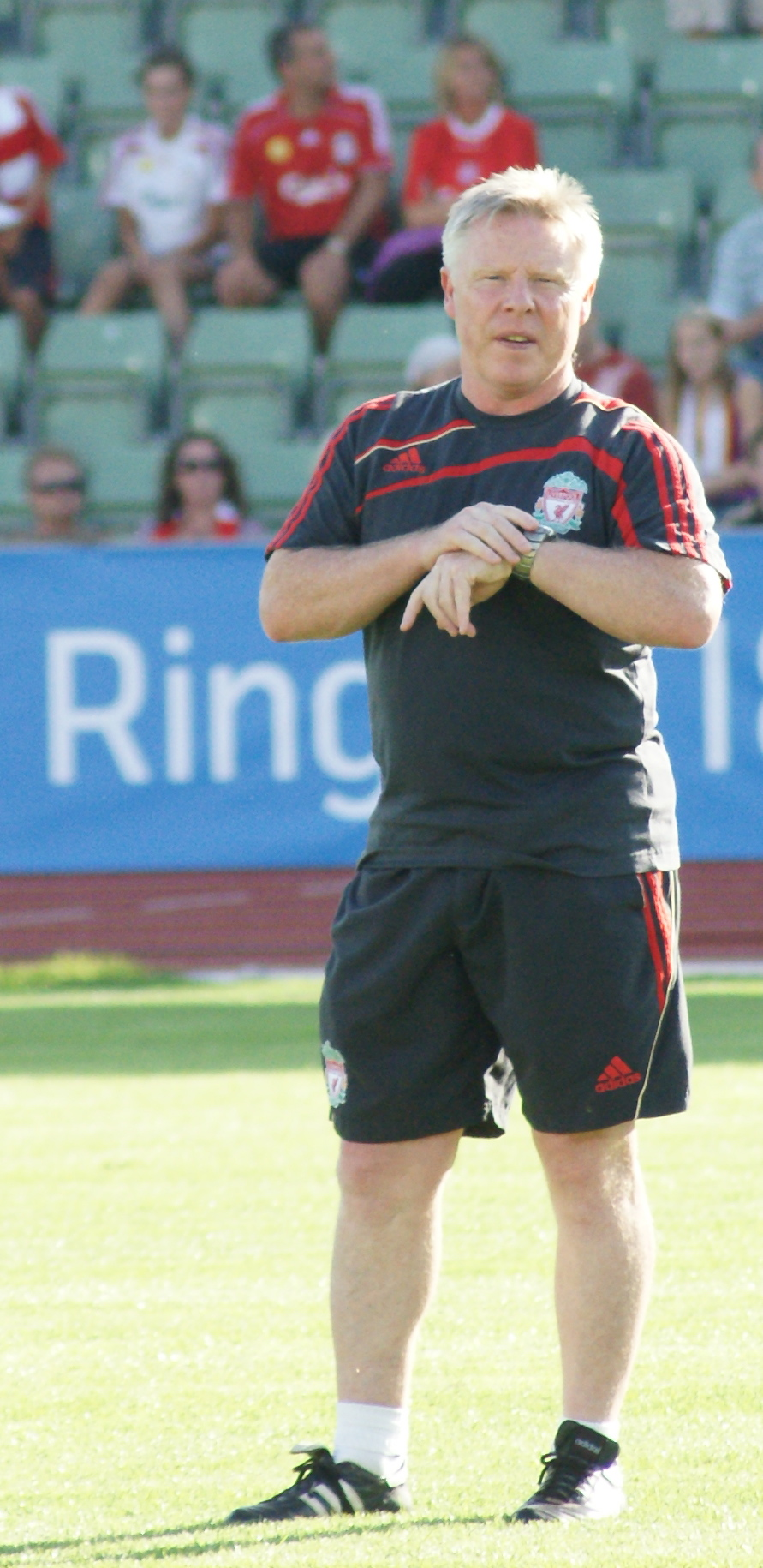
Sammy Lee made three appearances for Southampton in 1990, and later held a coaching position at the club.

Southampton Football Club is an English association football club based in Southampton, Hampshire. Founded in 1885 as St Mary's YMA, they became a professional club in 1891 and co-founded the Southern Football League in 1894. Southampton won the Southern League Premier Division championship six times between 1896 and 1904, and were later elected to the Football League Third Division in 1920. The Saints finished as runners-up in their first Football League season, and the following year received promotion to the Second Division as Third Division South champions. The club first entered the First Division in 1966, and currently play in its modern-day counterpart, the Premier League. Southampton won the FA Cup in 1976, reached the final of the League Cup in 1979 and 2017, and won the League Trophy in 2010.

Since the club's formation, a total of 608 players have made fewer than 25 appearances for Southampton. Of these, 136 players have played only one game for the club, while 11 have made 24 appearances. Jack Dorkin, who played as a centre-forward for Southampton between 1893 and 1895, has scored the most goals of any player with fewer than 25 appearances for the club, with 20 in all competitions; seven more players have scored ten or more goals for the Saints. Four players scored in their only appearance for Southampton, including Jock Fleming who scored a hat-trick on his only game. Bob MacDonald scored four goals in four appearances for the Saints, while Norman Higham scored two in two for the club.

== Key ==
- The list is ordered first by date of debut, and then if necessary in alphabetical order by surname.
- Appearances as a substitute are included. This feature of the game was introduced in the Football League at the start of the 1965–66 season.
- Statistics are correct up to and including the match played on 21 November 2026. Where a player left the club permanently after this date, his statistics are updated to his date of leaving.

Positions key
Pre-1960s		1960s–	
GK	Goalkeeper		
FB	Full back	DF	Defender
HB	Half back	MF	Midfielder
FW	Forward		

Nationality
Unless otherwise noted, the nationality of a player is determined by the country for which he has played, or if he has not played international football, his country of birth.
Position
Playing positions are listed according to the tactical formations that were employed at the time. The change in the names of defensive and midfield positions reflects the tactical evolution that occurred from the 1960s onwards.
Club career
Club career is defined as the first and last calendar years in which the player appeared for the club in any of the competitions listed below.
Total appearances and Total goals
Total appearances and goals comprise those in the Southern League, Wessex League, Football League, Premier League, Southern Alliance, Southern District Combination, United League, FA Cup, League/EFL Cup, FA Charity/Community Shield, League/EFL Trophy, Inter-Cities Fairs Cup, UEFA Europa League/UEFA Cup, UEFA Cup Winners' Cup, Southern Floodlit Cup, Southern Charity Cup, Texaco Cup, Full Members Cup, Hampshire Senior Cup, Hampshire Junior Cup, Hampshire Benevolent Cup, Hampshire County Cricket Club Charity Cup, Portsmouth Cup, Rowland Hospital Cup and Victory Cup. Wartime competitions are excluded.

== Players ==
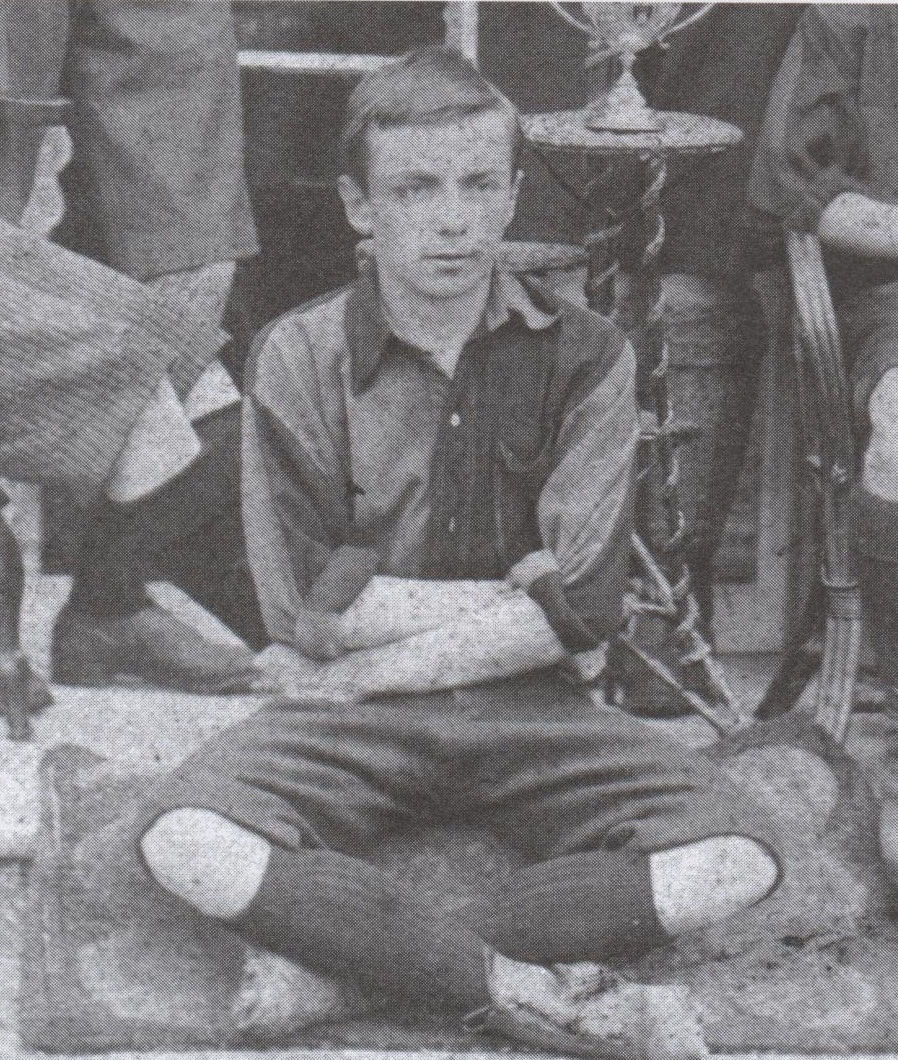
Charles William Miller, who made four appearances for Southampton, is widely credited with introducing football to Brazil.

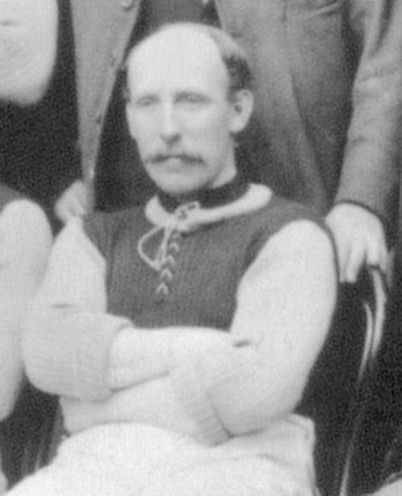
Jack Reynolds, who made seven appearances for the Saints, is the only footballer to have played for both the Irish and English national sides.

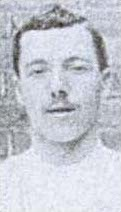
Geordie Dewar made 14 appearances for Southampton.

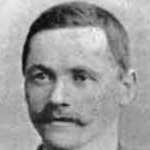
Jack McNee played one game during a trial for the club in April 1901.

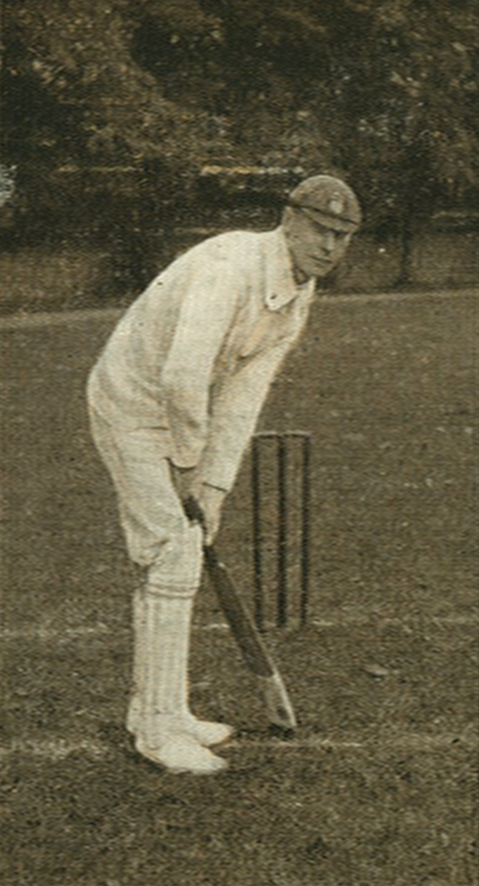
Former cricketer Phil Mead played a single game in goal for the Saints in 1907.

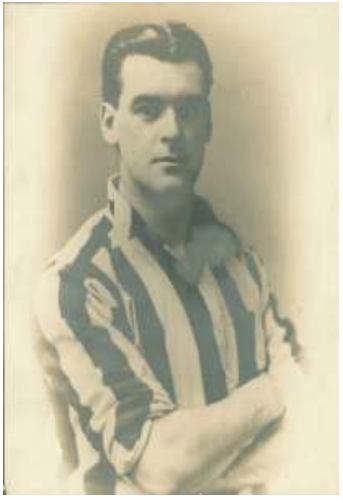
Charles Tyson played 16 times for Southampton.

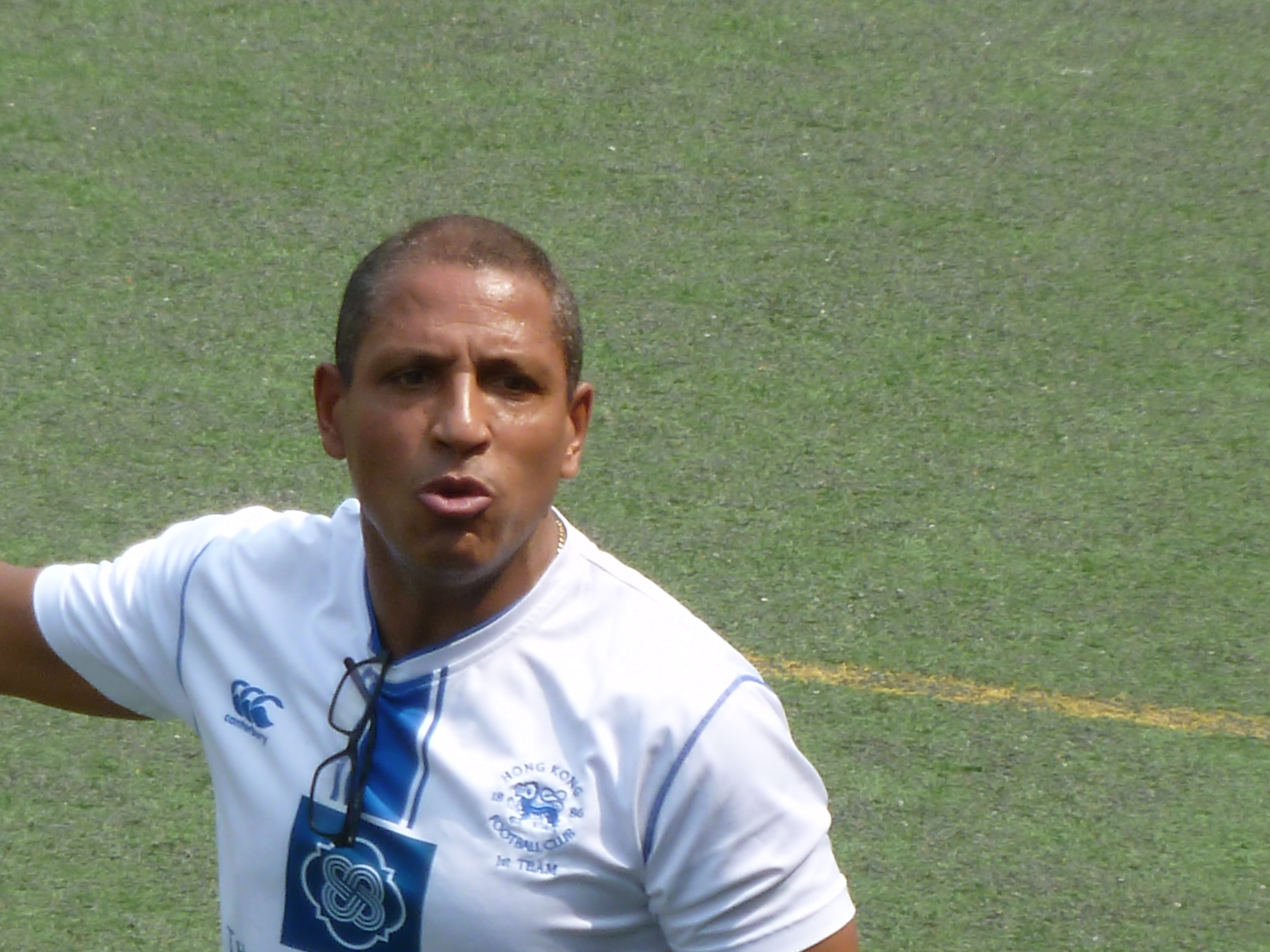
Tony Sealy played eight times for Southampton.

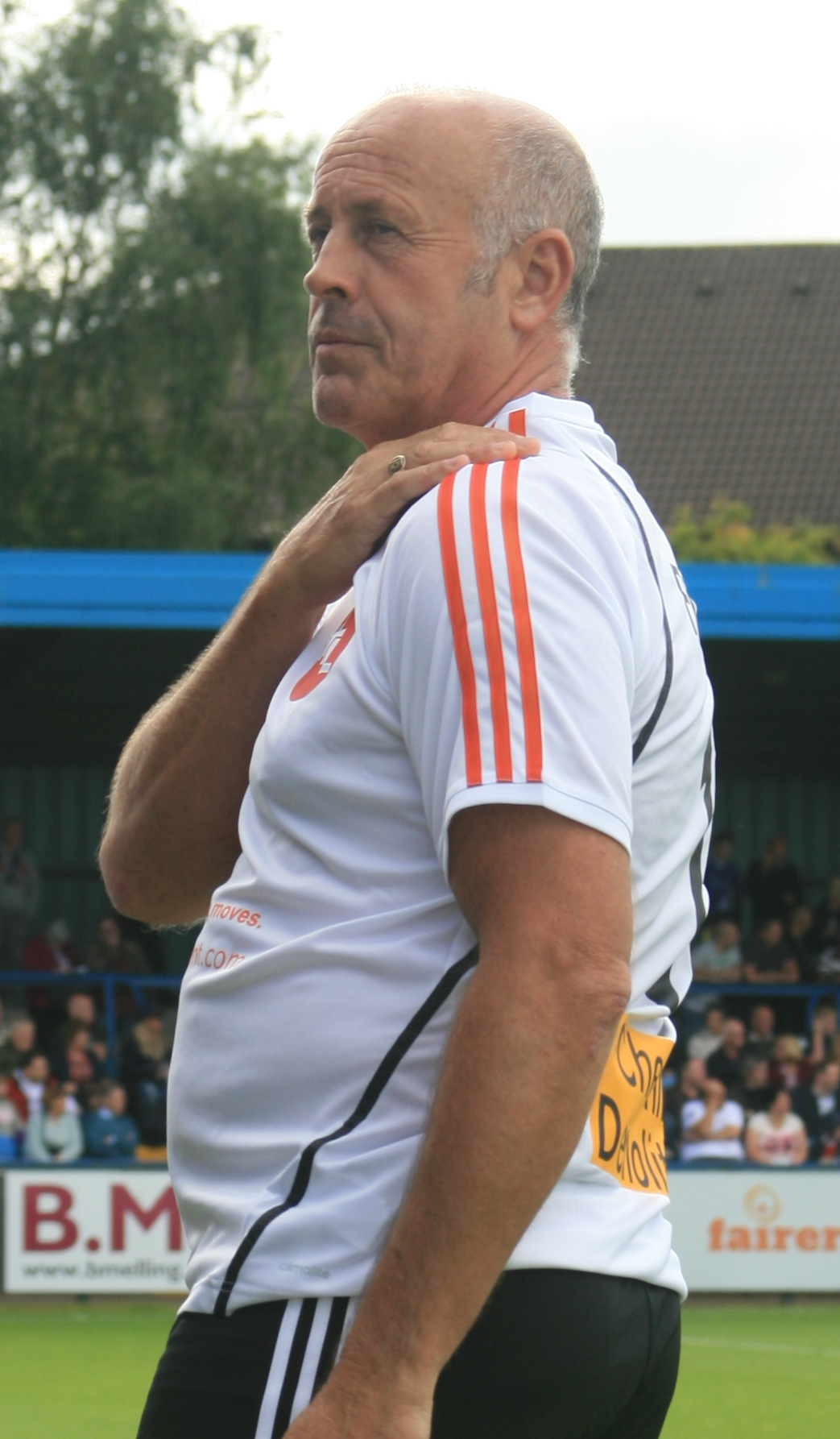
Martin Foyle scored three goals in 15 appearances.

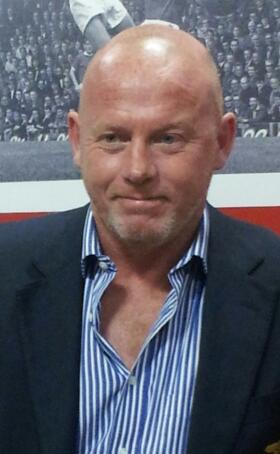
Perry Groves played 18 times for Southampton.

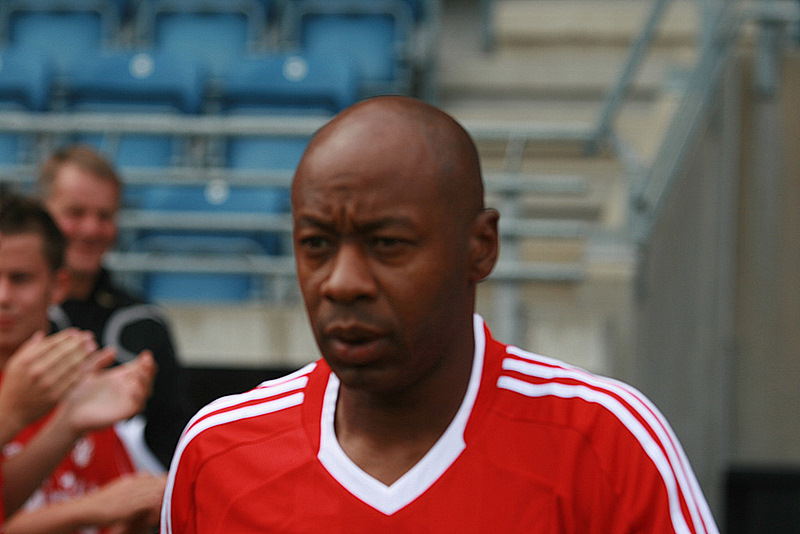
Mark Walters made nine appearances for the Saints.

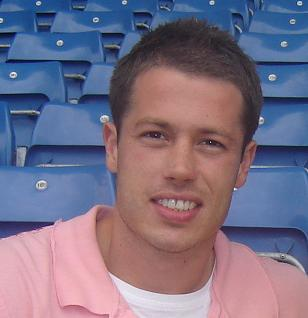
Steve Basham made 20 appearances for the club, 19 of which were as a substitute.

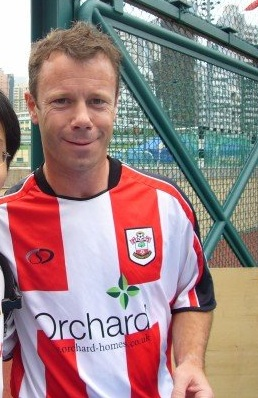
David Howells played 12 times for Southampton.

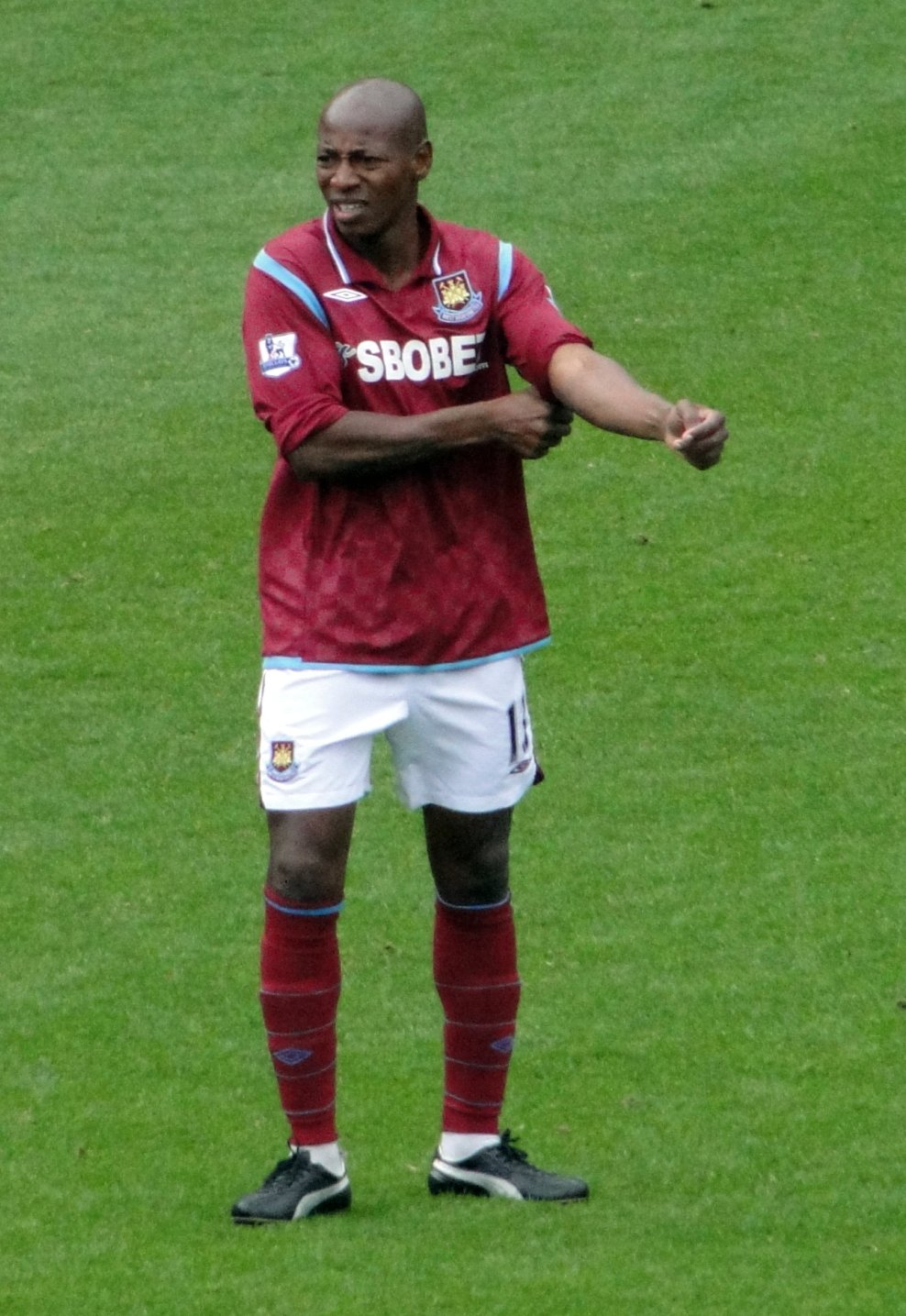
Luís Boa Morte played 17 times for the Saints.

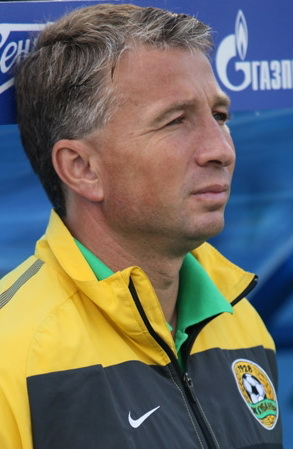
Dan Petrescu scored twice in 11 appearances for the club.

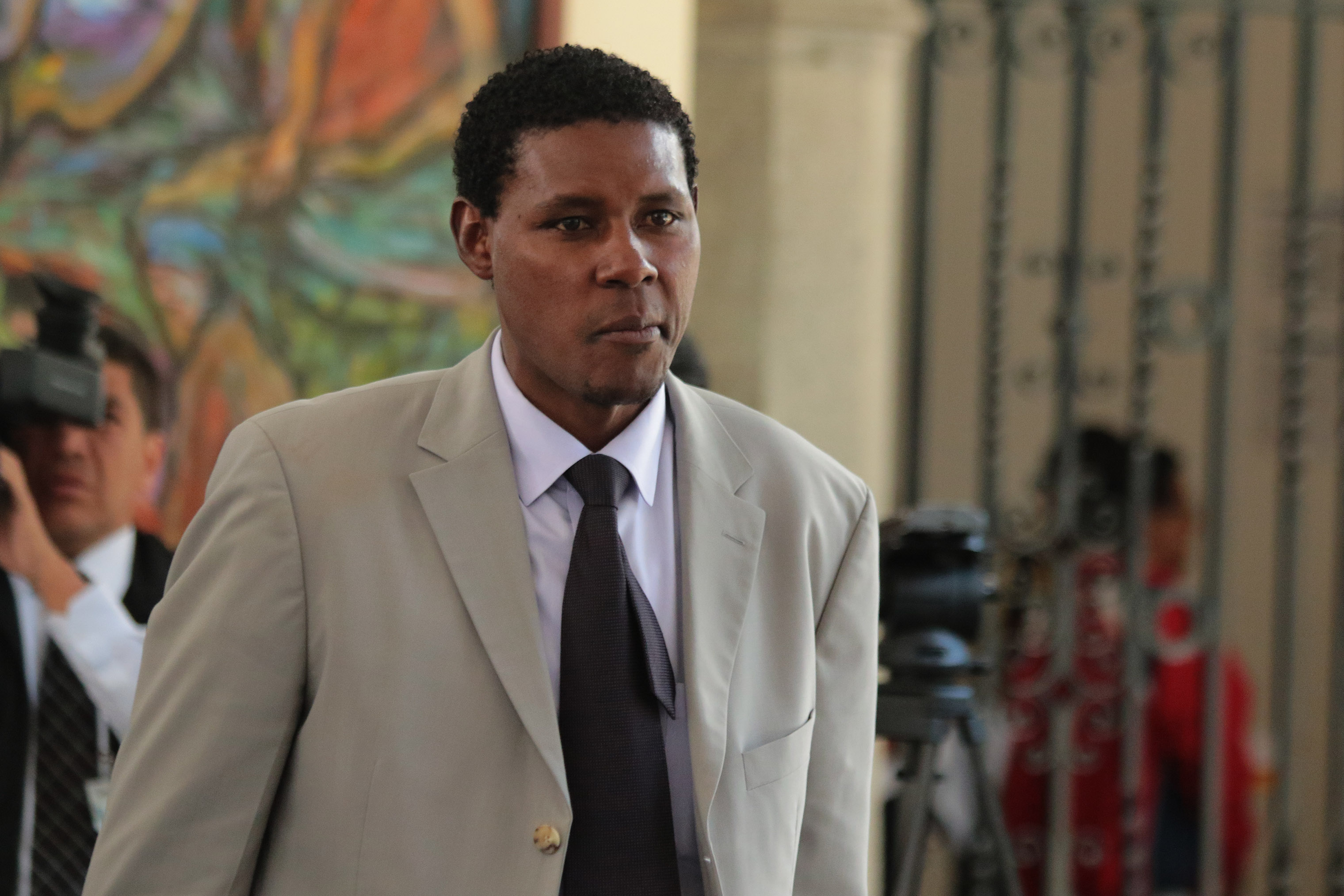
Ecuador international striker Agustín Delgado scored two goals in 15 appearances.

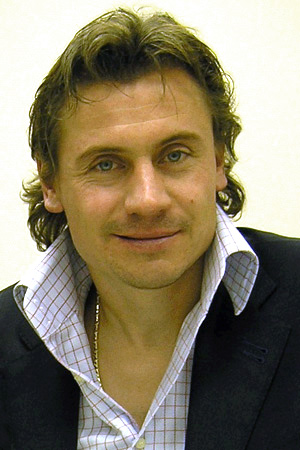
Russian winger Andrei Kanchelskis played twice for Southampton in 2002.

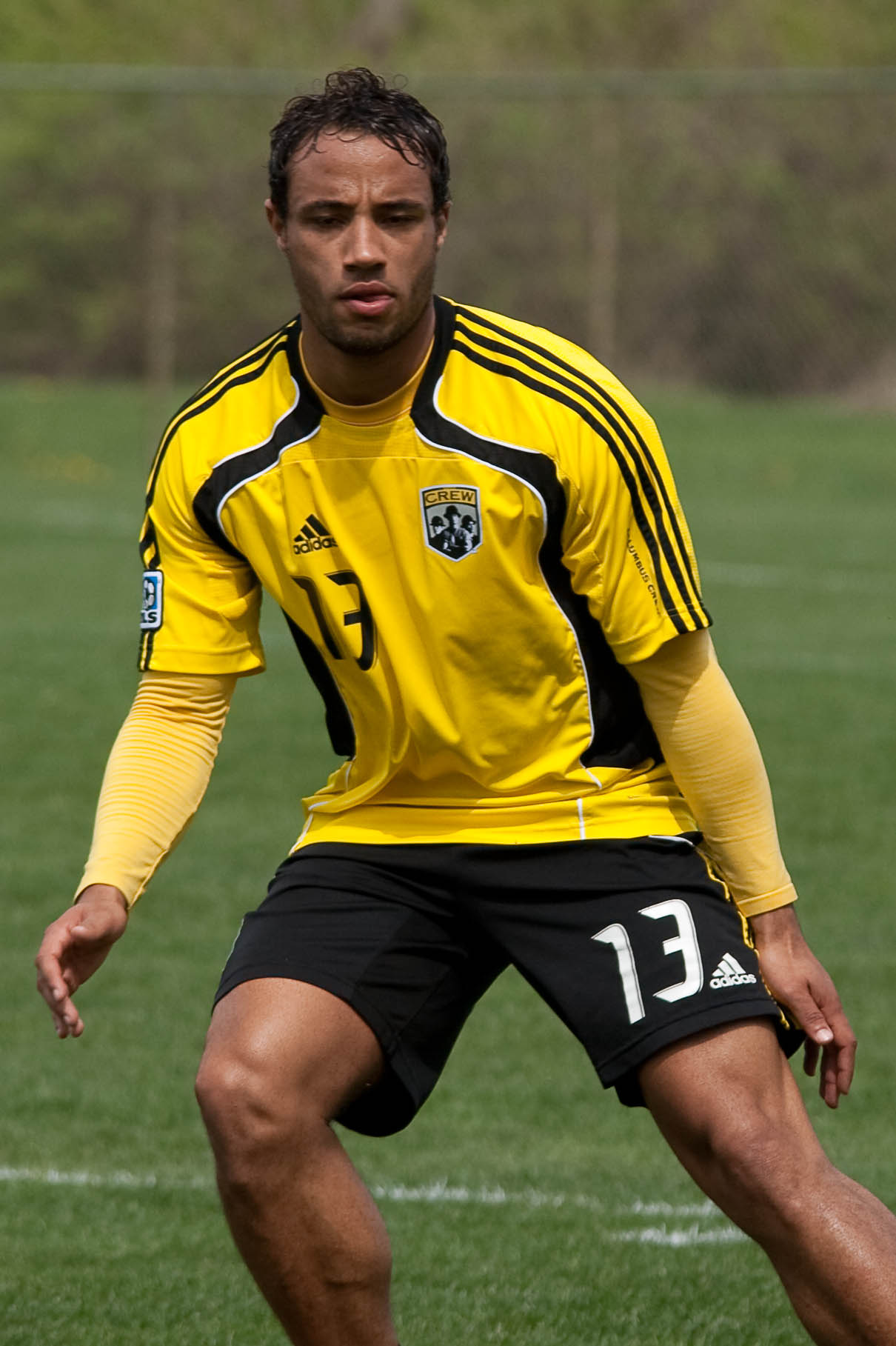
Léandre Griffit scored two goals in eight games for Southampton.

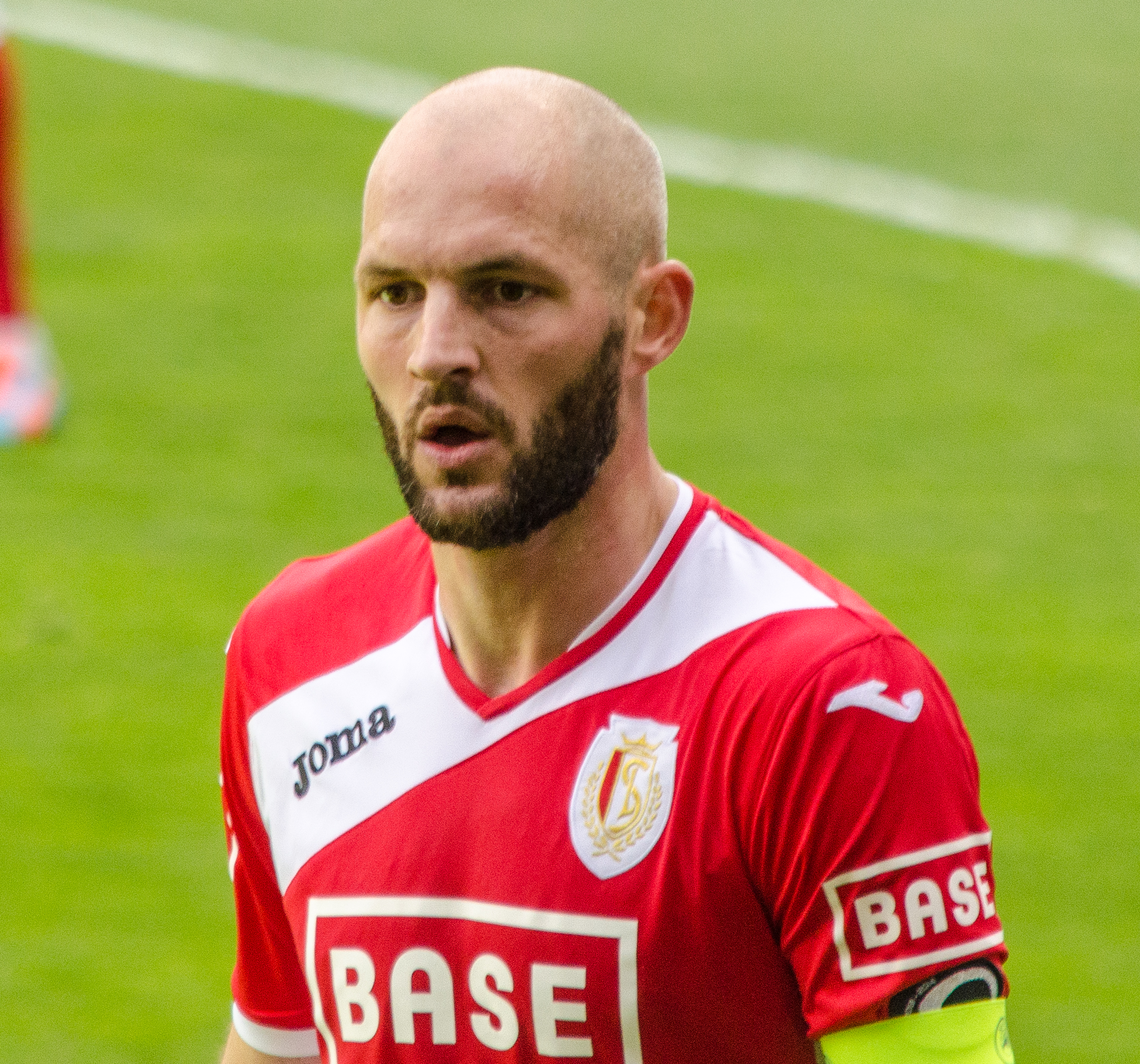
Jelle Van Damme played nine times for the Saints.

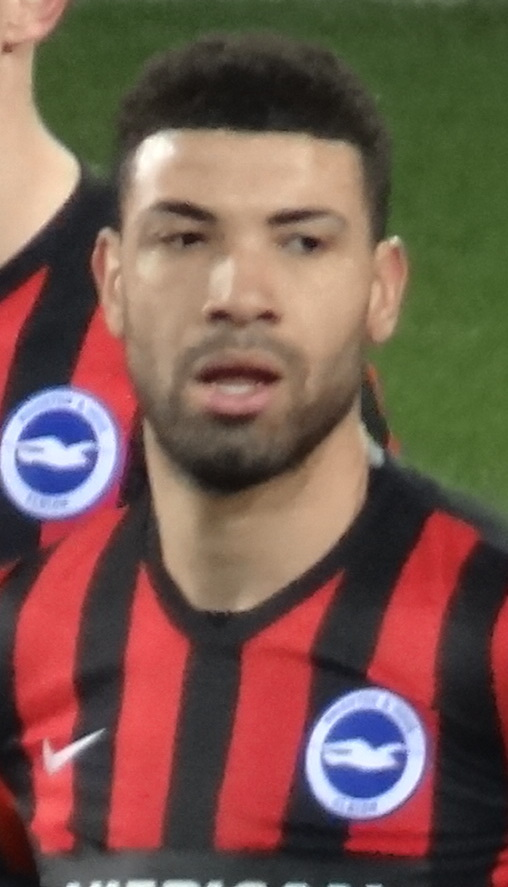
Leon Best scored four times in 17 games for the club.

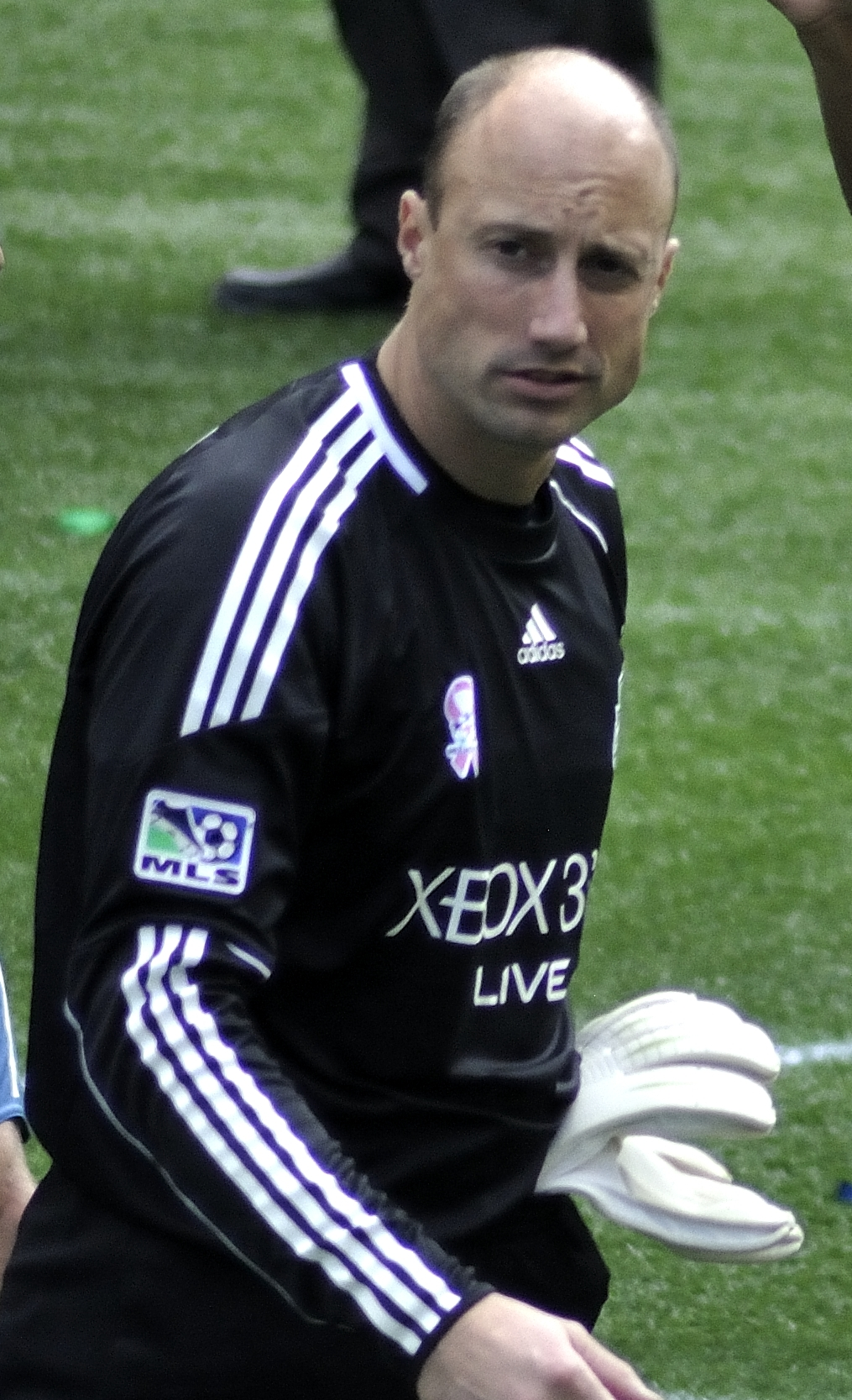
United States goalkeeper Kasey Keller made four appearances for Southampton during an emergency loan spell.

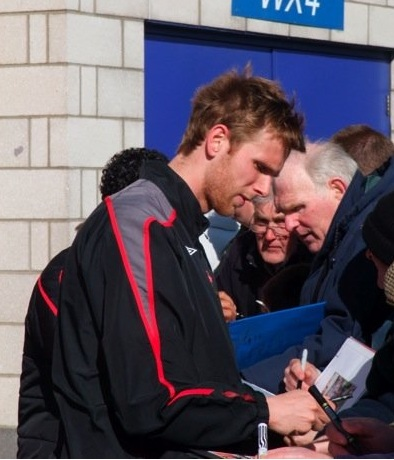
Calum Davenport played 12 times for Southampton.

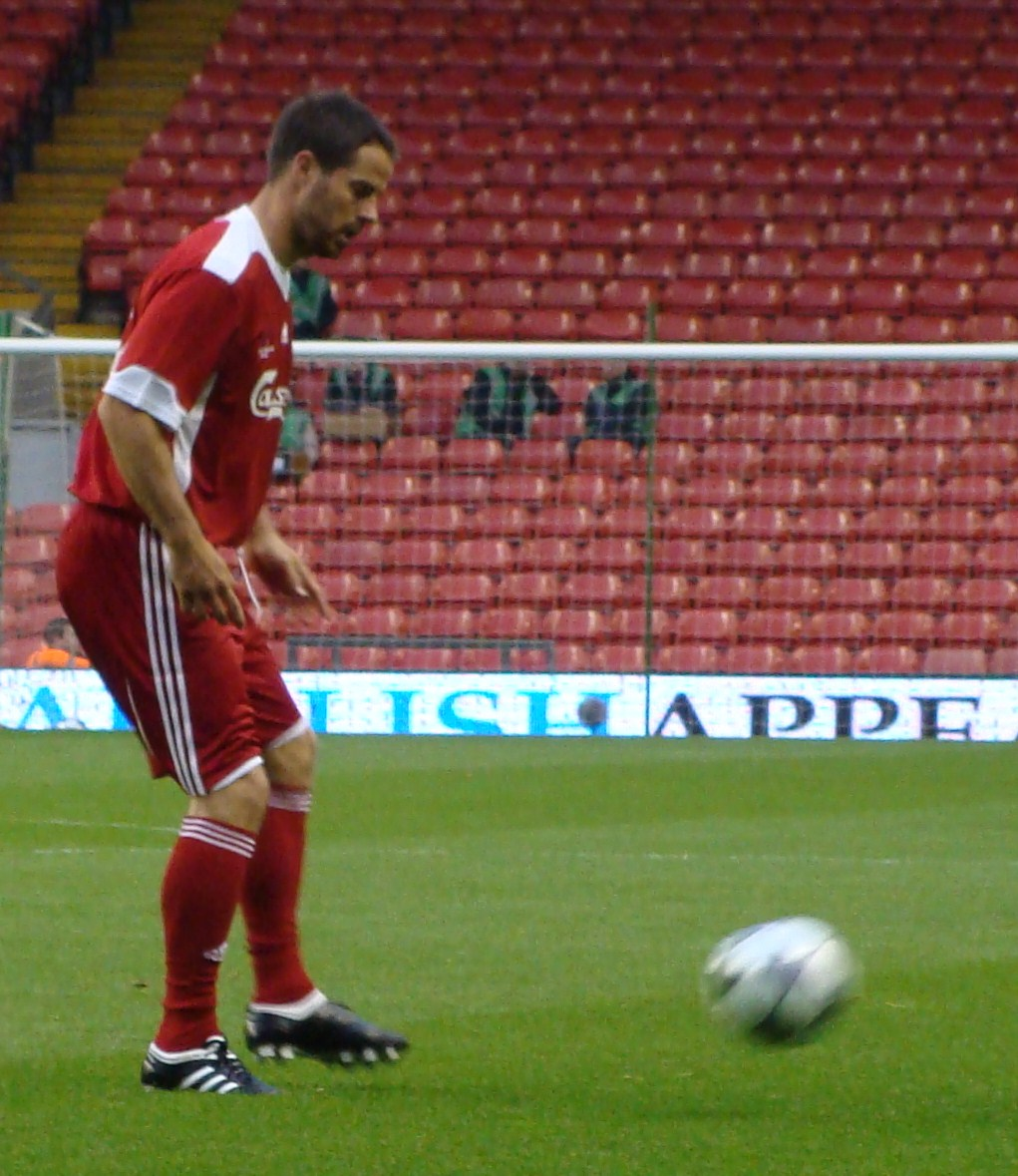
Jamie Redknapp was signed in 2004 by his father, then-manager Harry Redknapp.

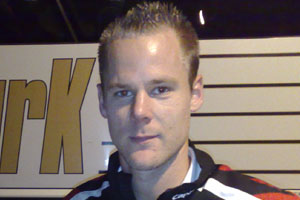
Paul Smith played 21 times for Southampton.

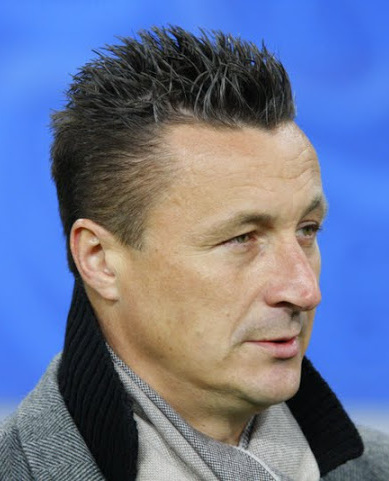
Tomasz Hajto made 21 appearances for the Saints.

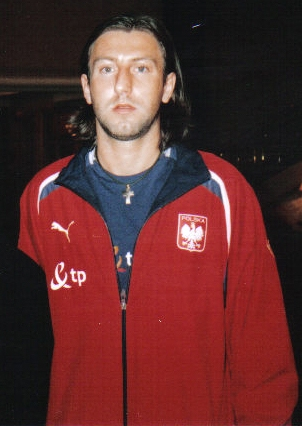
Kamil Kosowski joined the club on loan in 2005.

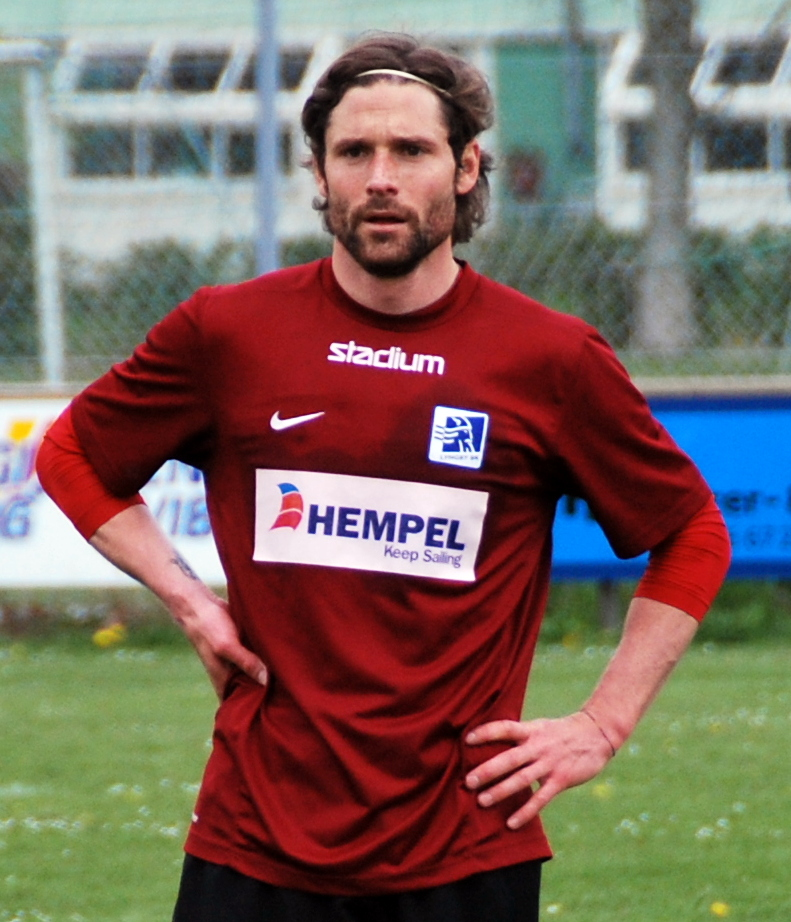
Peter Madsen played ten times for Southampton.

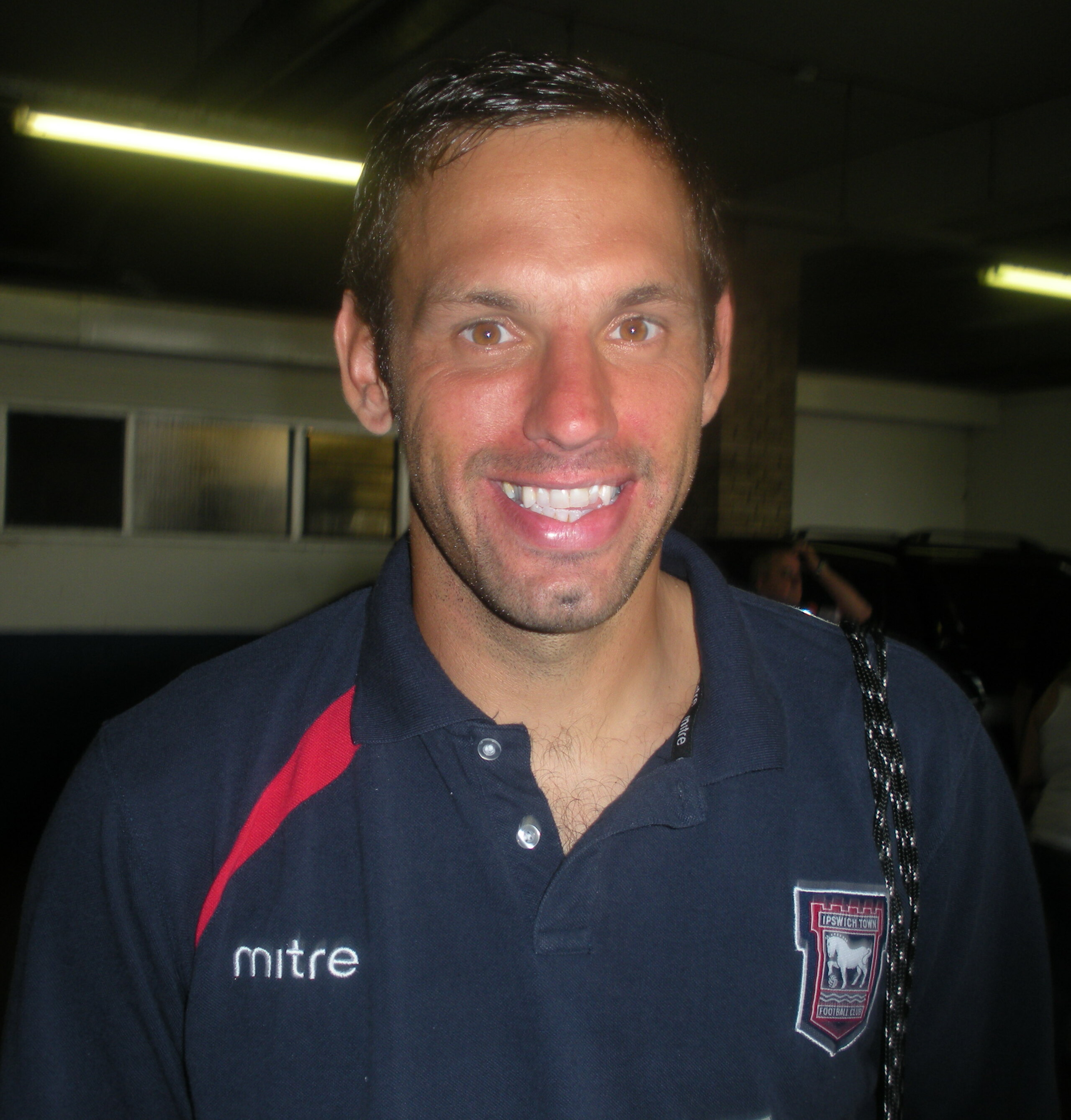
Richard Wright played seven times for Southampton in 2008.

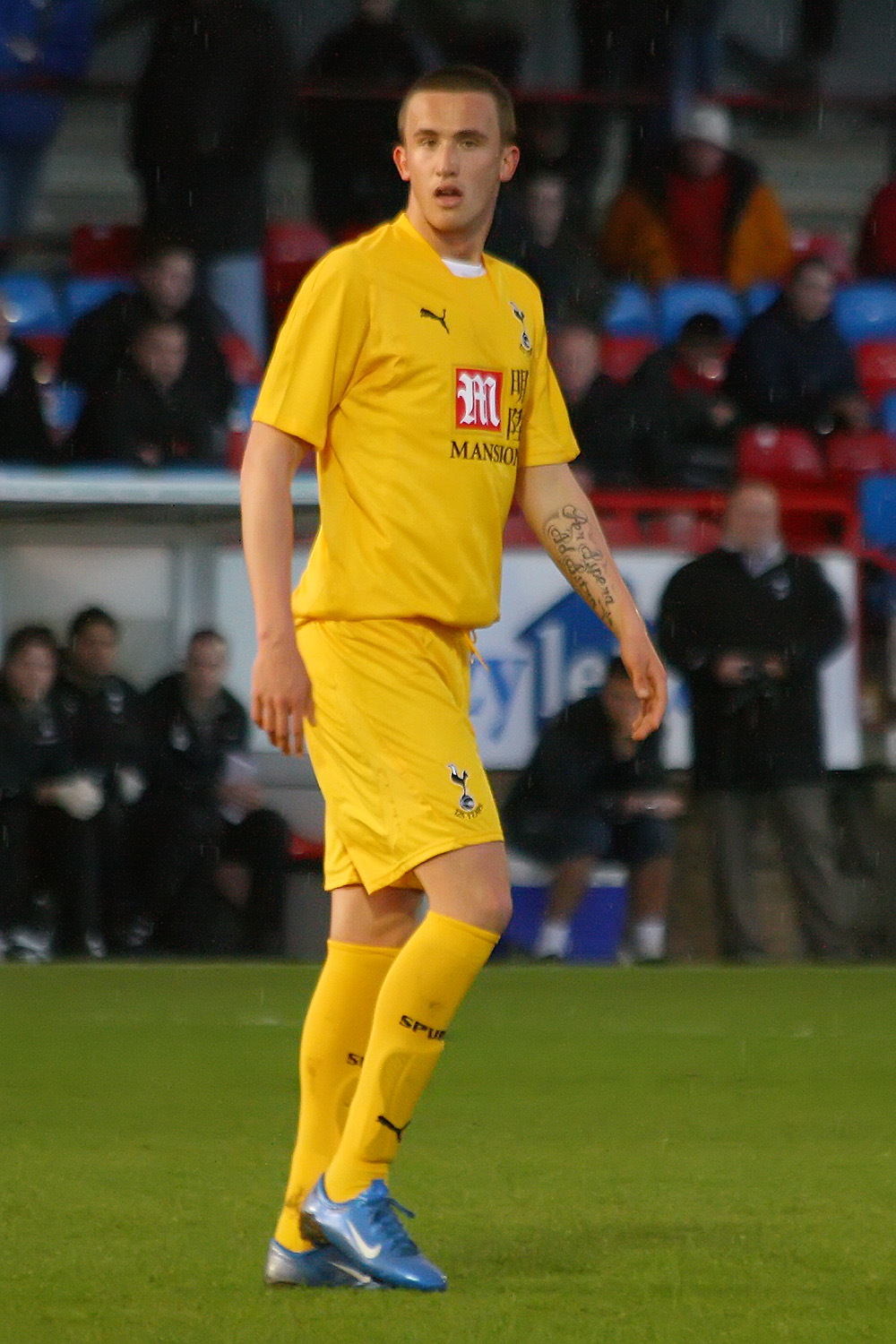
Tomáš Pekhart scored once in ten games for the club.

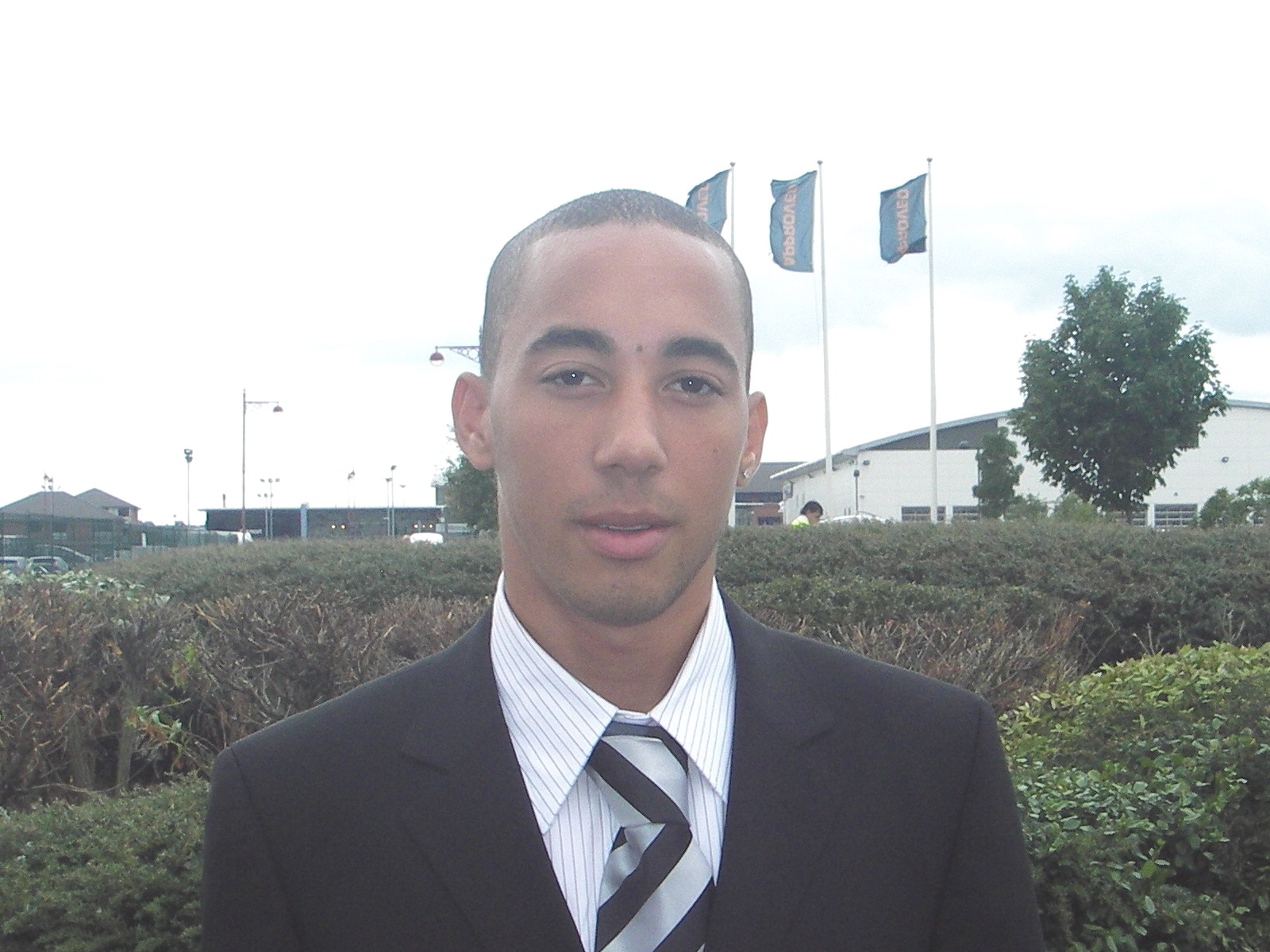
Ryan Smith made 14 appearances for Southampton.

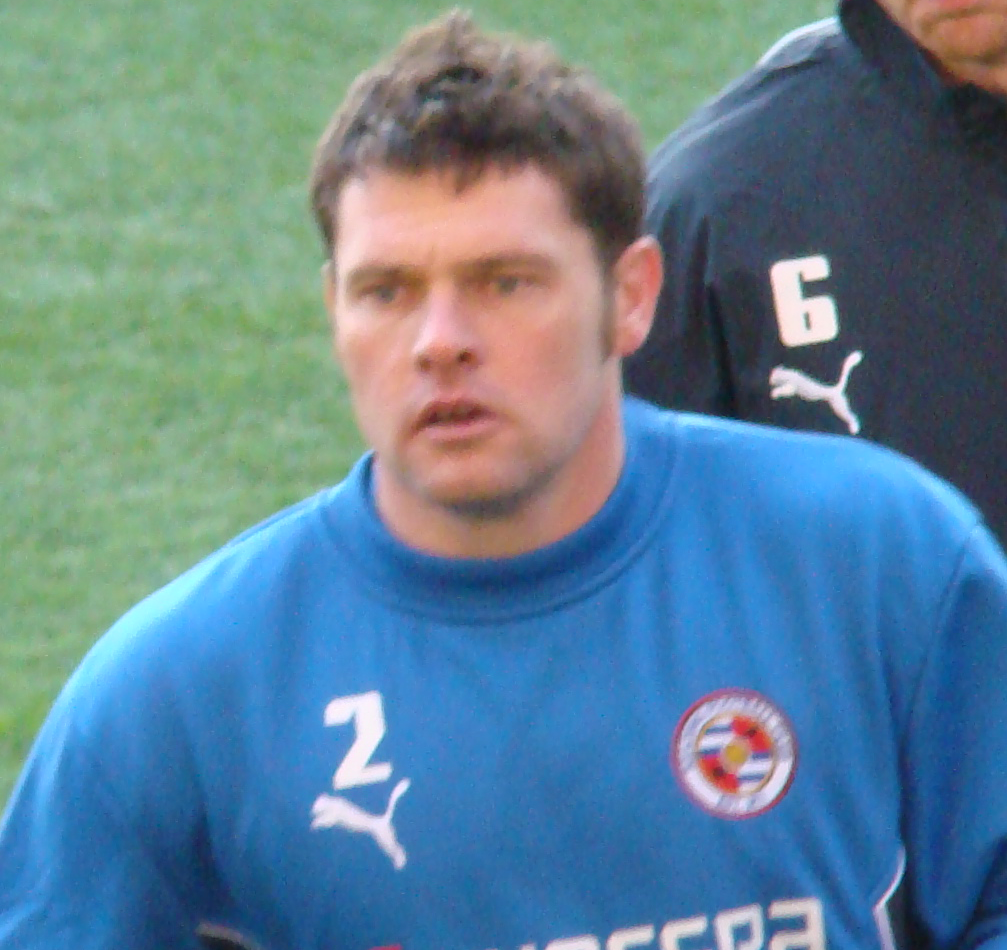
Graeme Murty ended his career at Southampton in 2009.

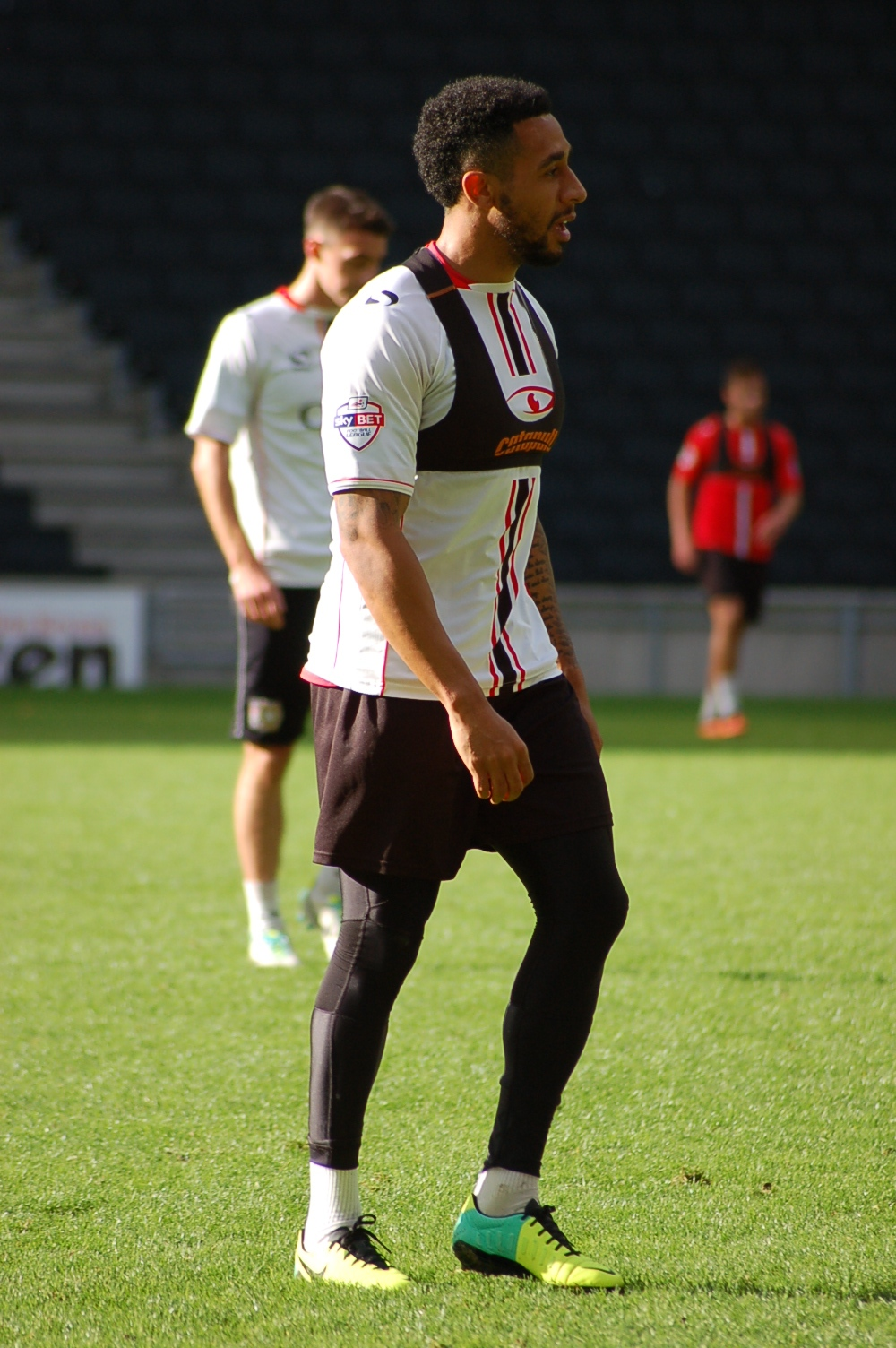
Jon Otsemobor played 19 times for the Saints in 2010.

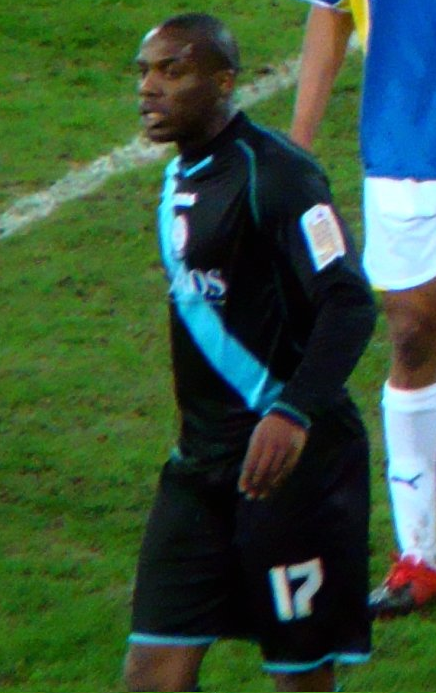
Dany N'Guessan made seven appearances for Southampton in 2011.

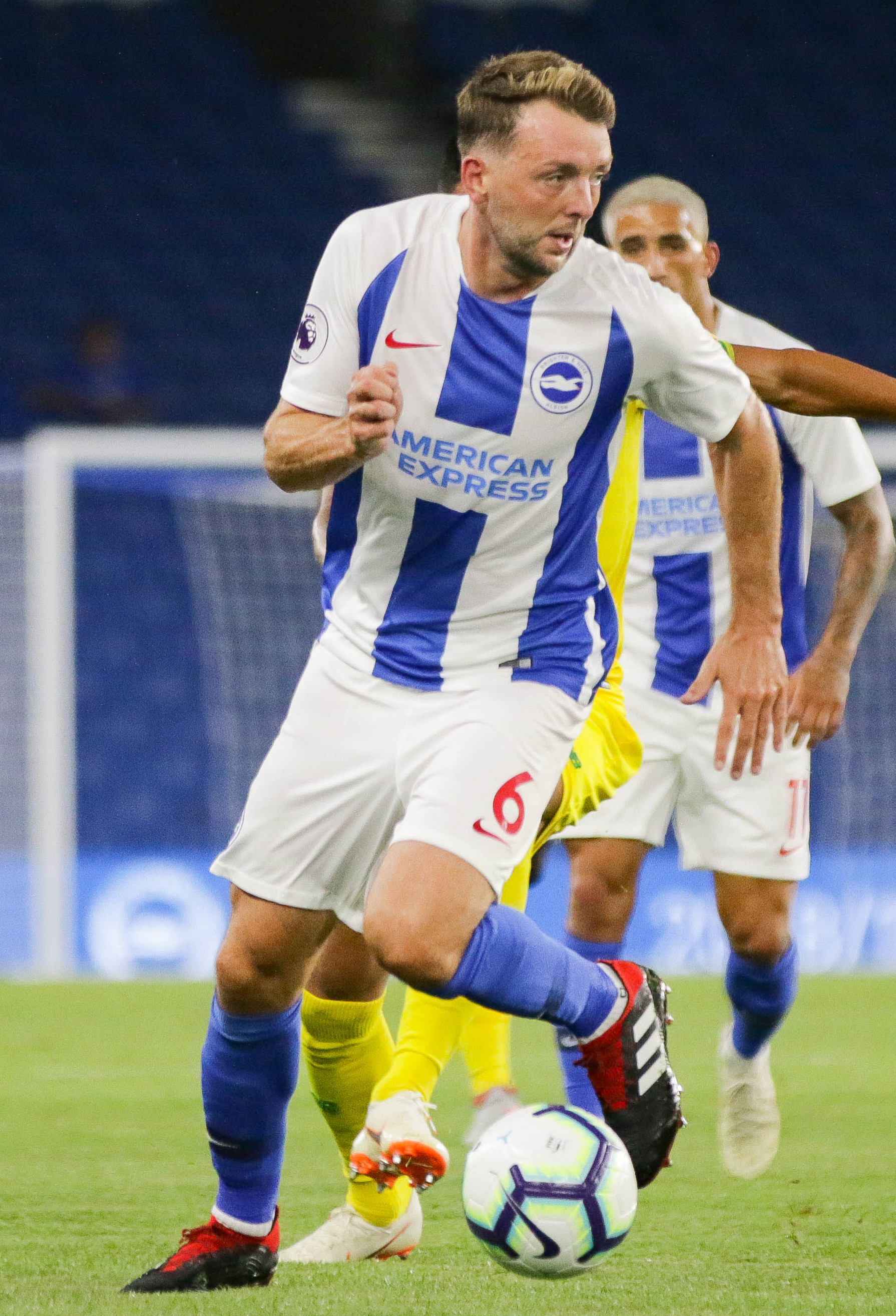
Dale Stephens made six appearances for the Saints.

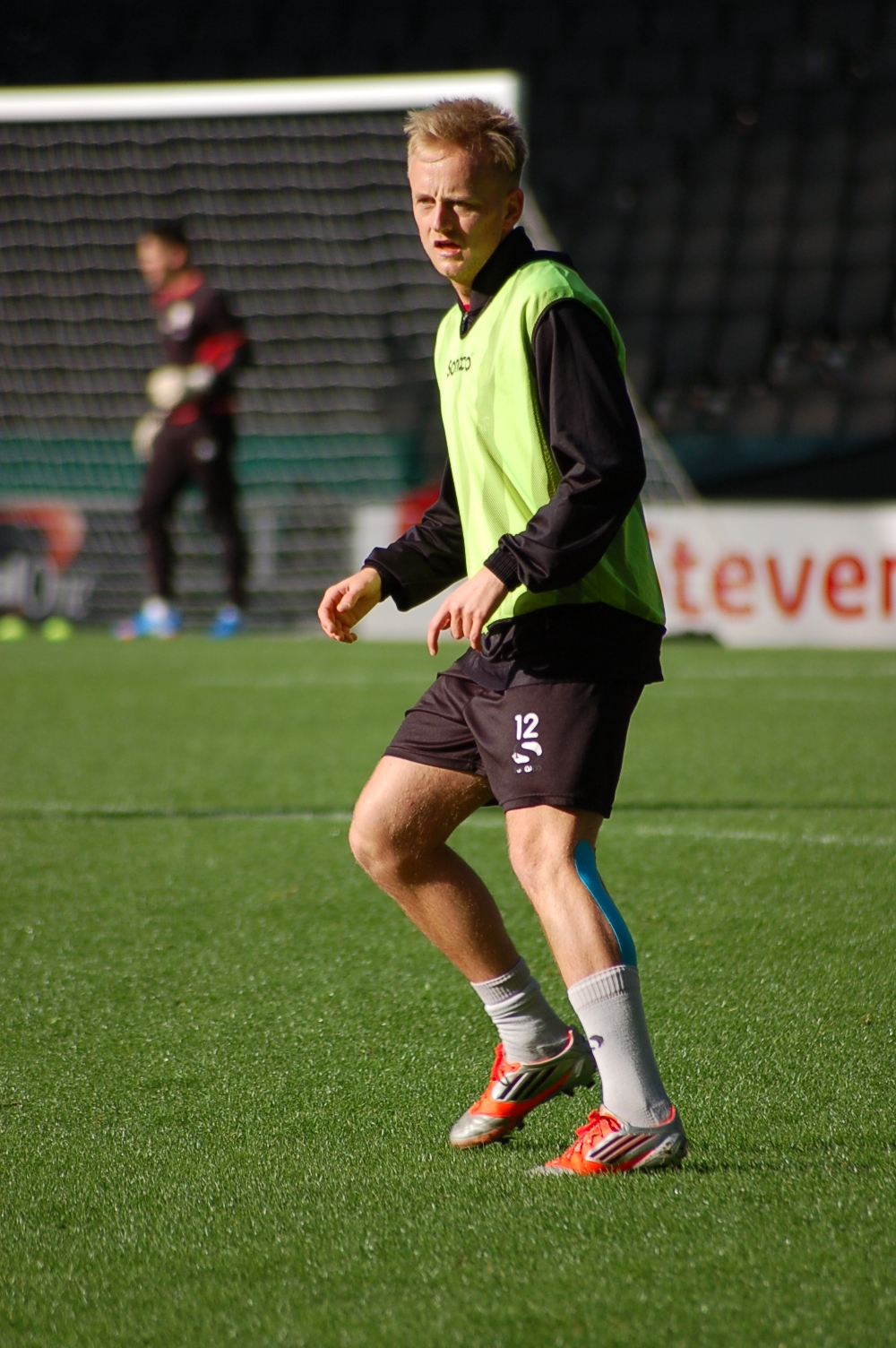
Ben Reeves made 13 appearances for Southampton, scoring once.

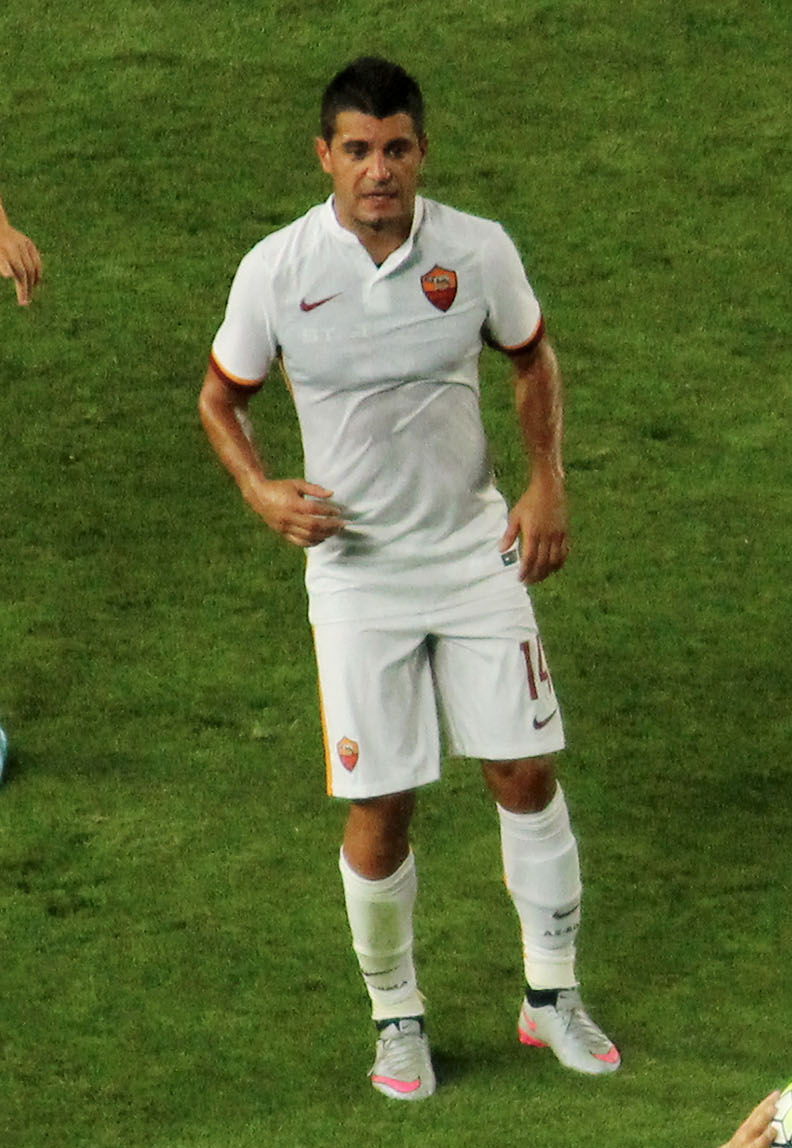
Iago Falque made a single appearance for Southampton in January 2012.

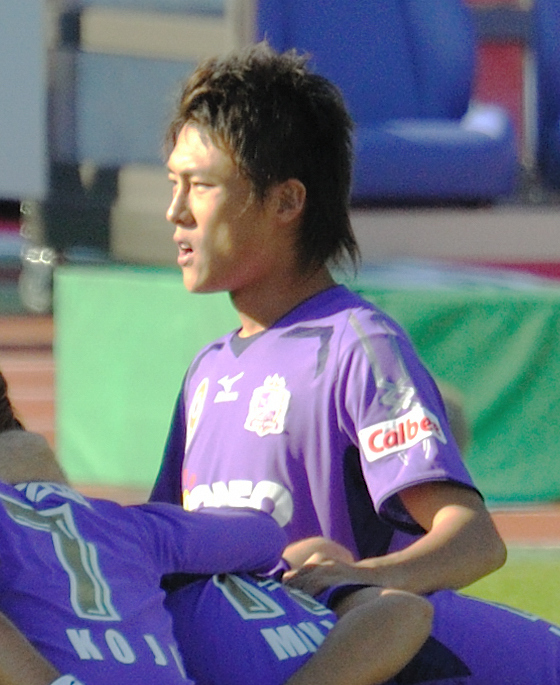
Japanese striker Tadanari Lee scored twice for the club.

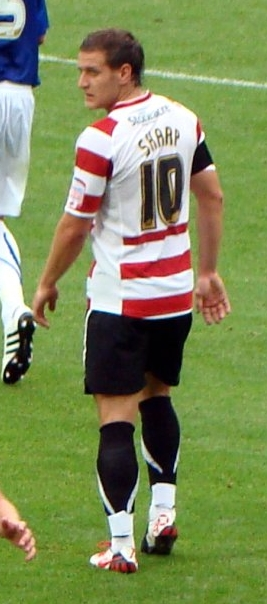
Billy Sharp scored ten goals in 18 games in 2012.

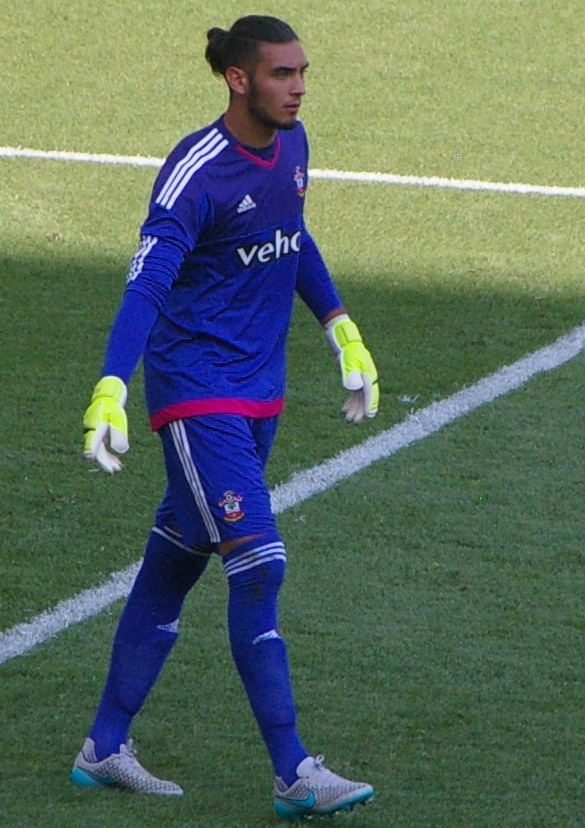
Goalkeeper Paulo Gazzaniga appeared 23 times for the Saints.

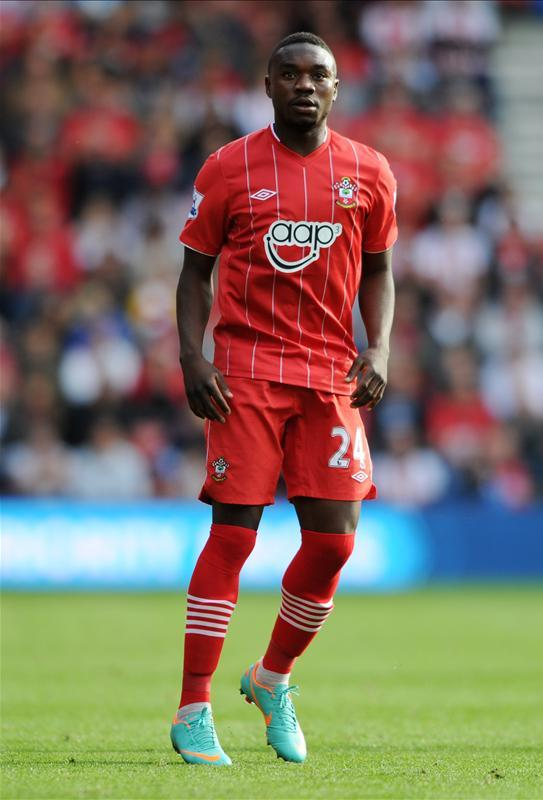
Zambian Emmanuel Mayuka made 19 appearances and scored once for Southampton.

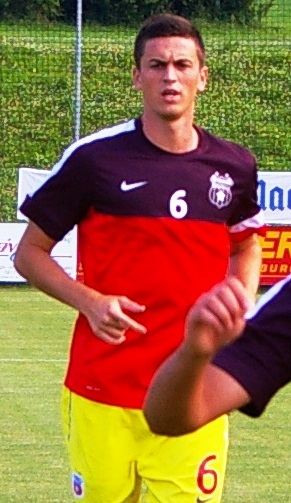
Florin Gardoș made 18 appearances for Southampton.

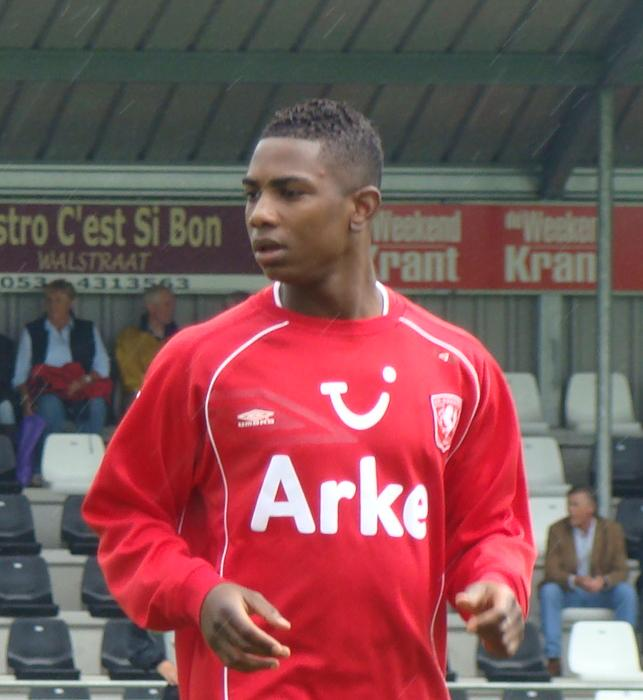
Eljero Elia scored twice in 17 appearances for Southampton.

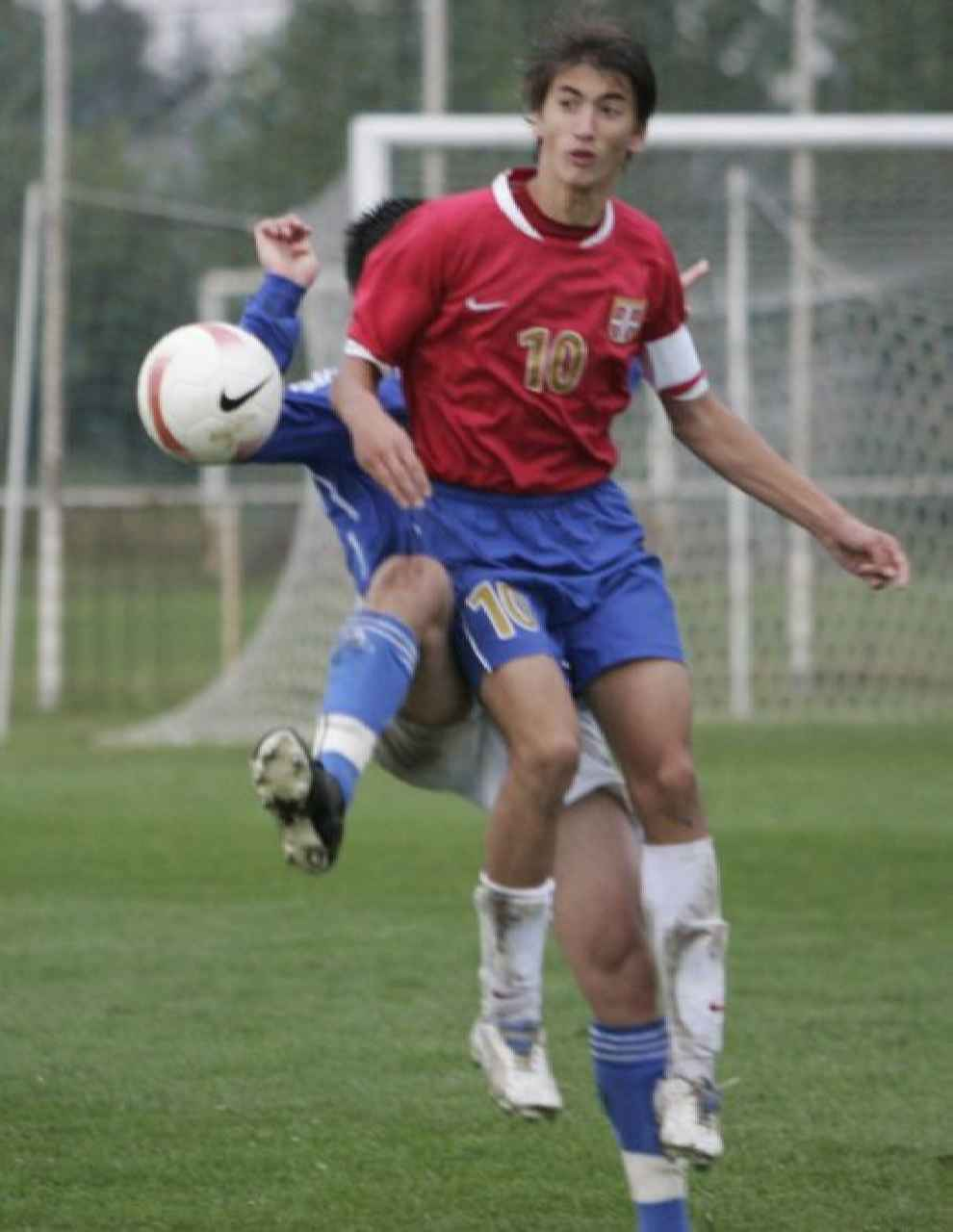
Filip Đuričić played nine times for the Saints during a 2015 loan spell.

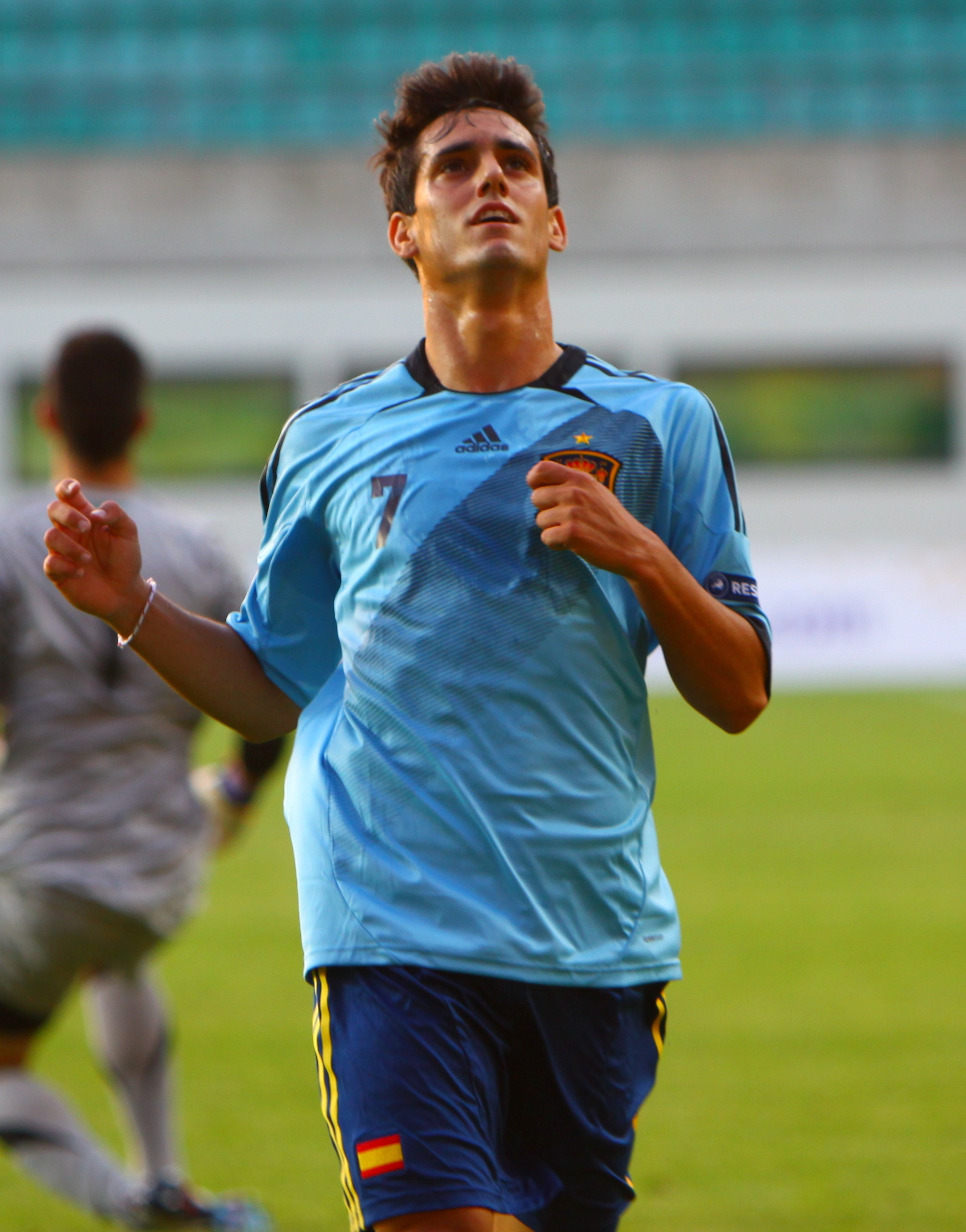
Spanish forward Juanmi played 19 times for Southampton between 2015 and 2016.

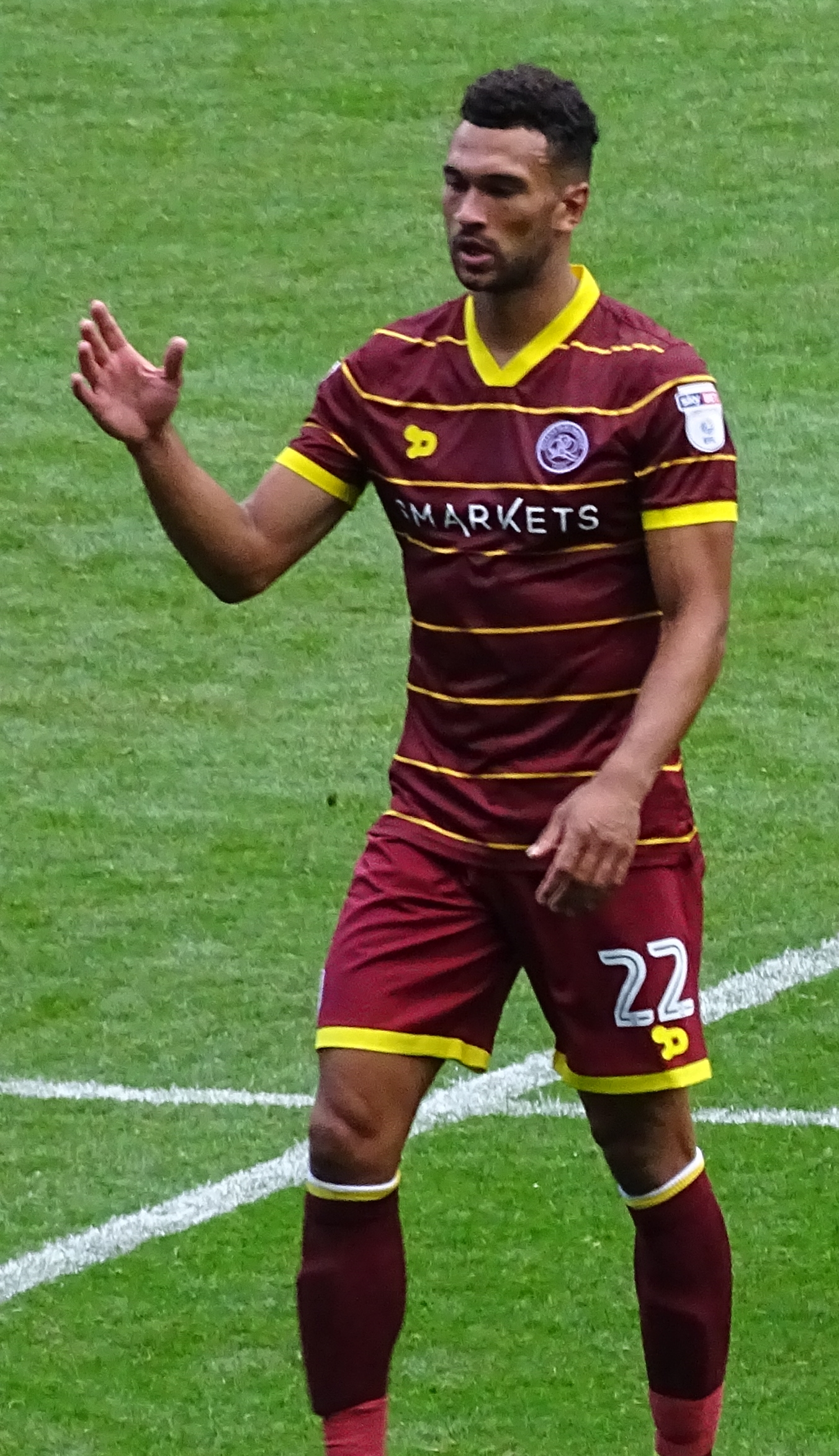
Steven Caulker played eight times for Southampton during a brief loan spell in 2015.

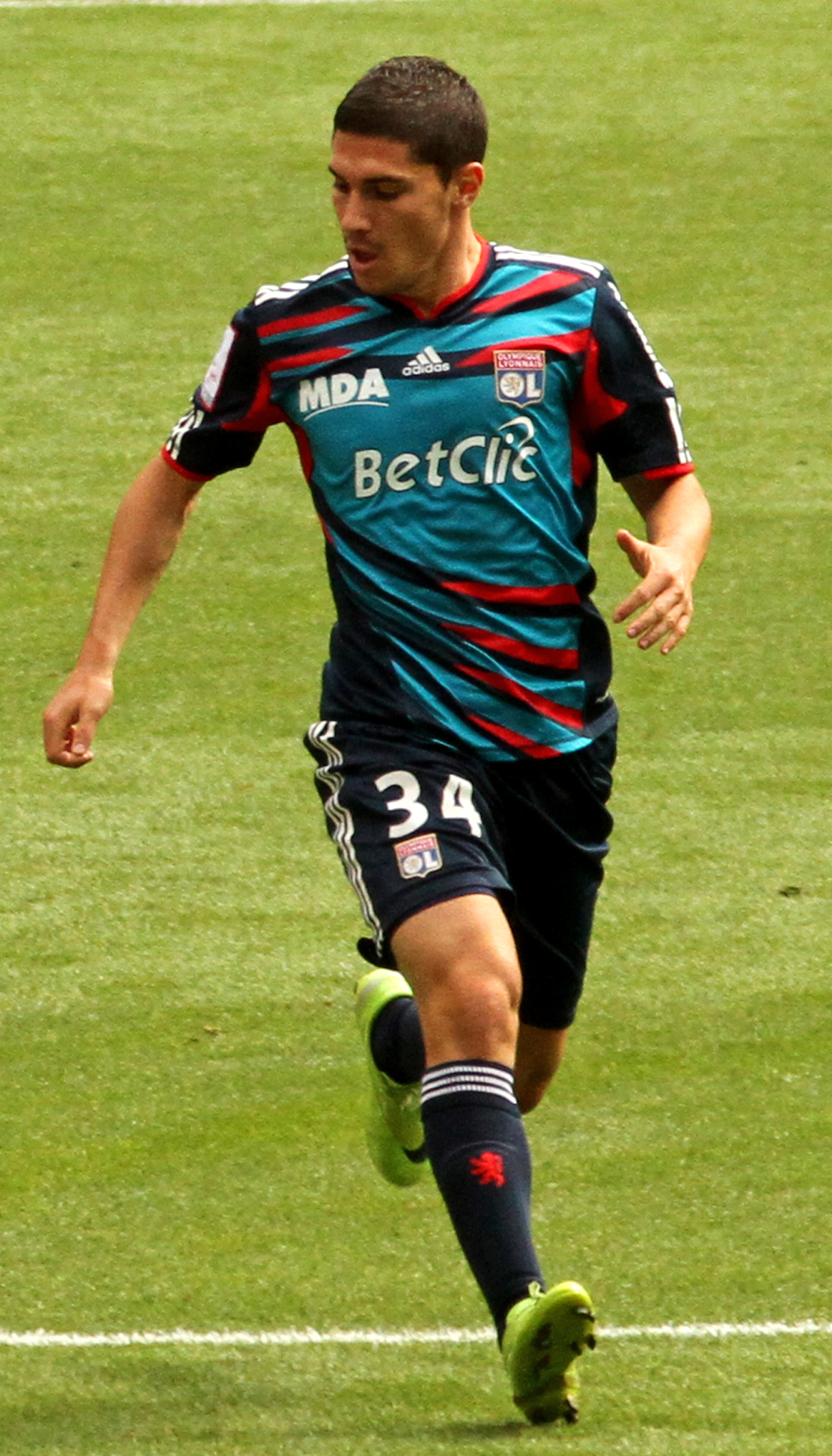
Defender Jérémy Pied made eight appearances for the Saints between 2016 and 2018.

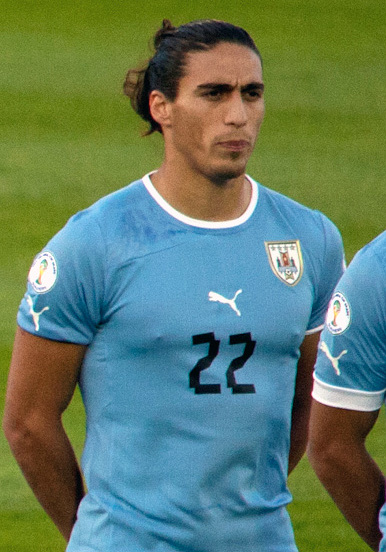
Martín Cáceres made one appearance for Southampton in 2017.

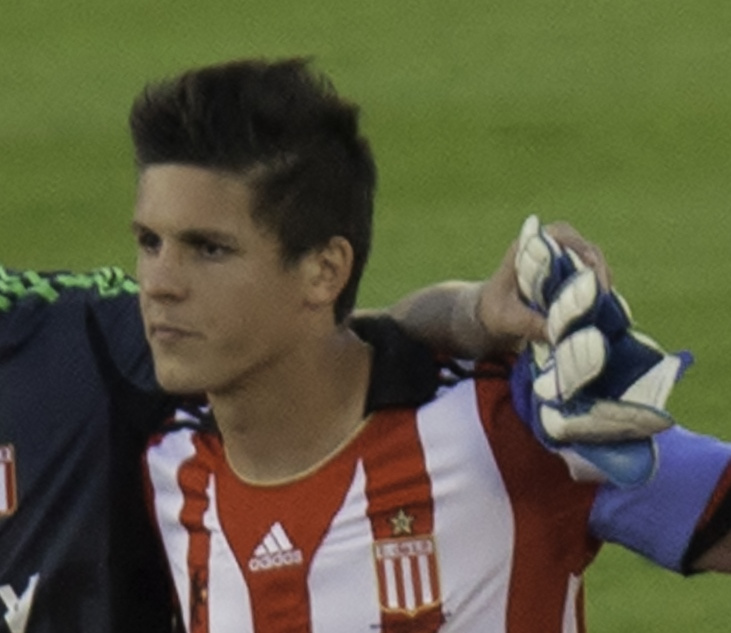
Guido Carrillo made ten appearances for Southampton in 2018.

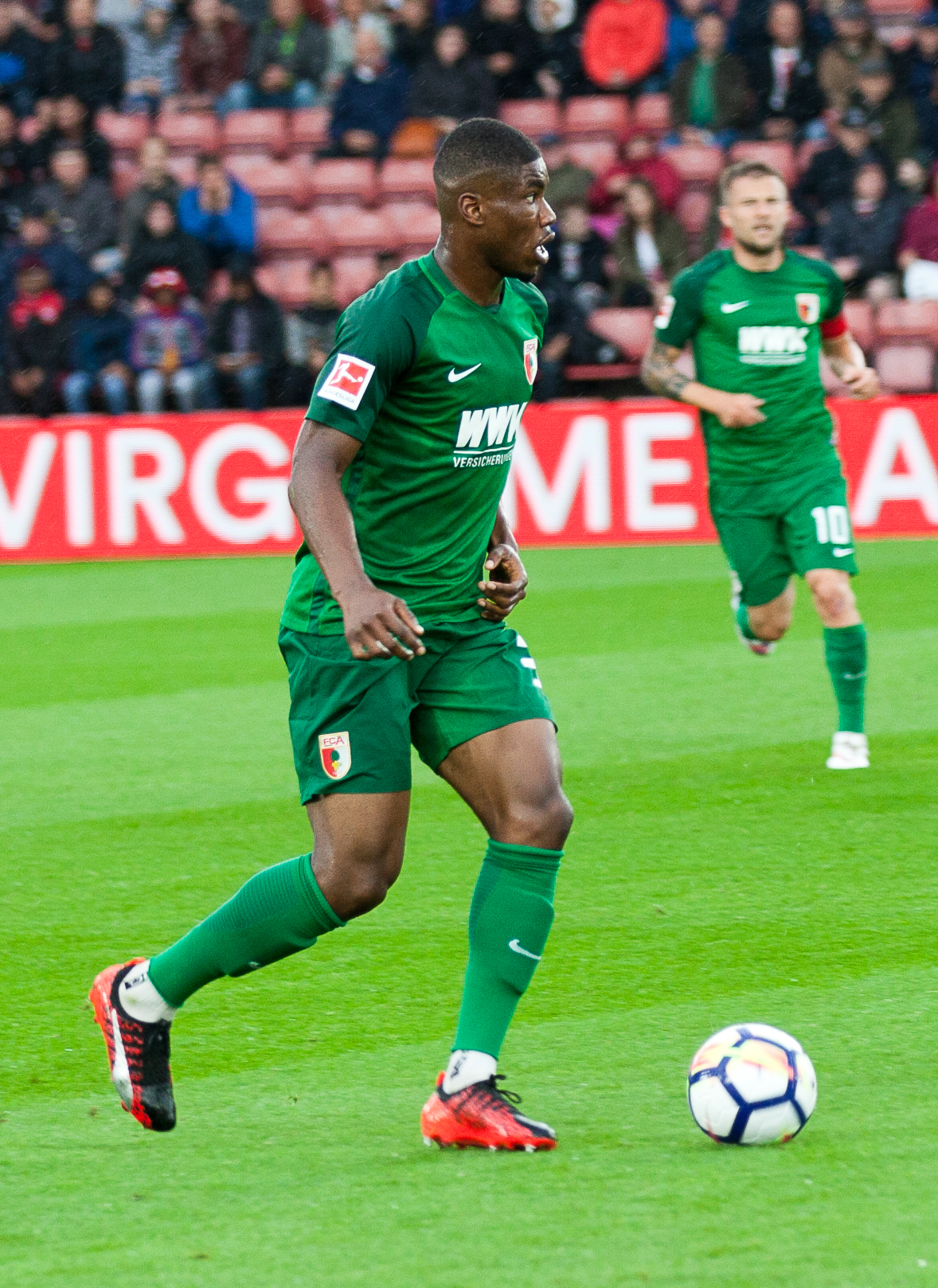
Kevin Danso joined Southampton on loan from FC Augsburg in 2019.

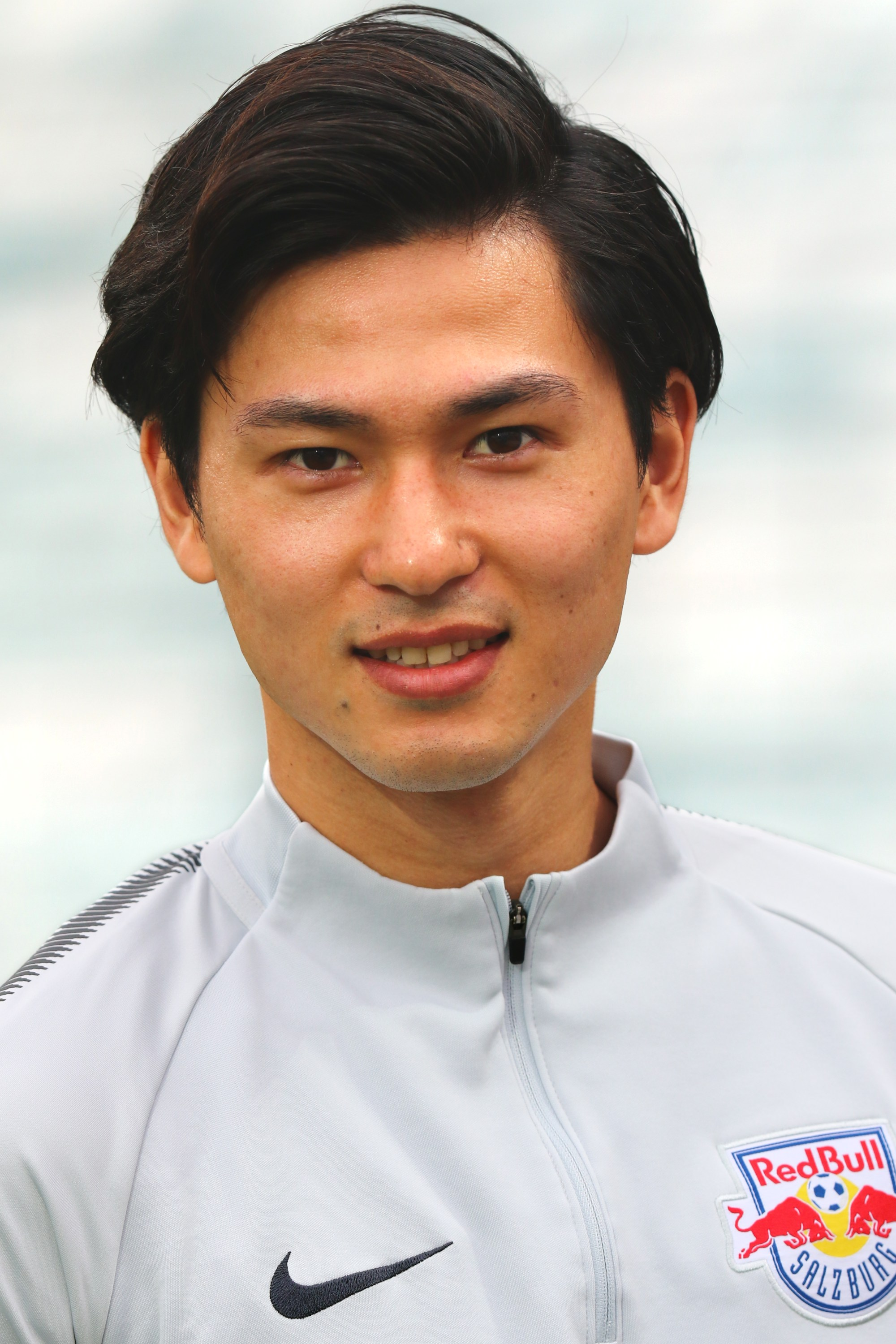
Takumi Minamino made 10 appearances for Southampton.

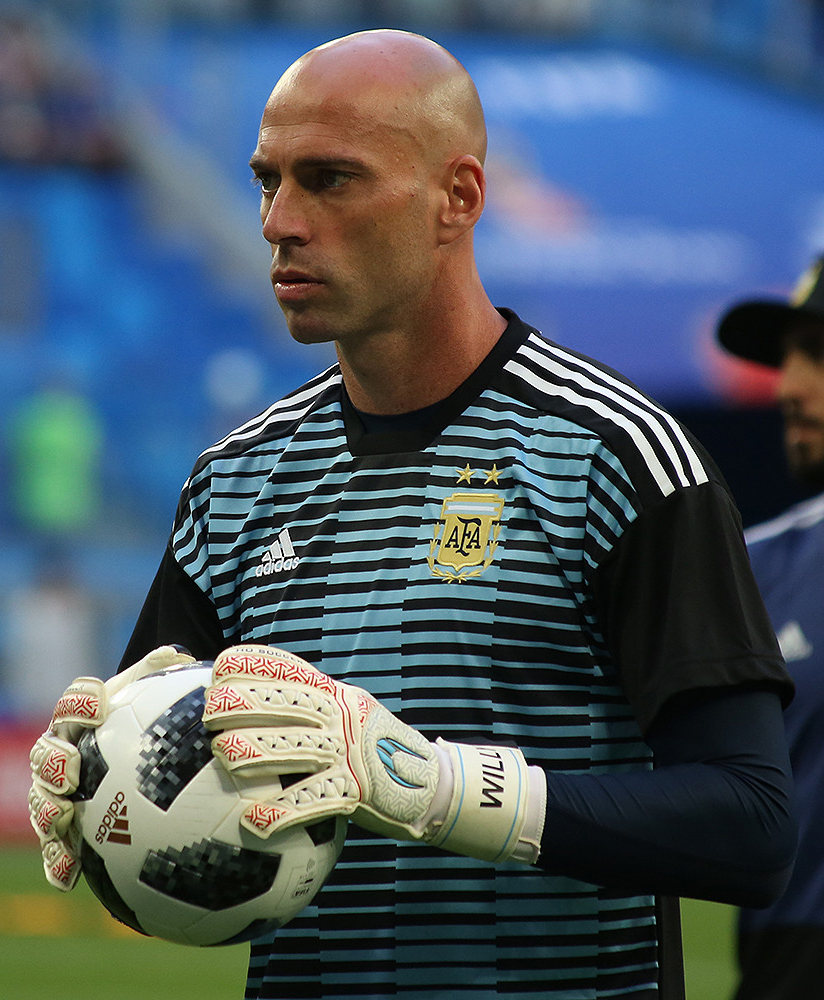
Willy Caballero made his Southampton debut in December 2021.

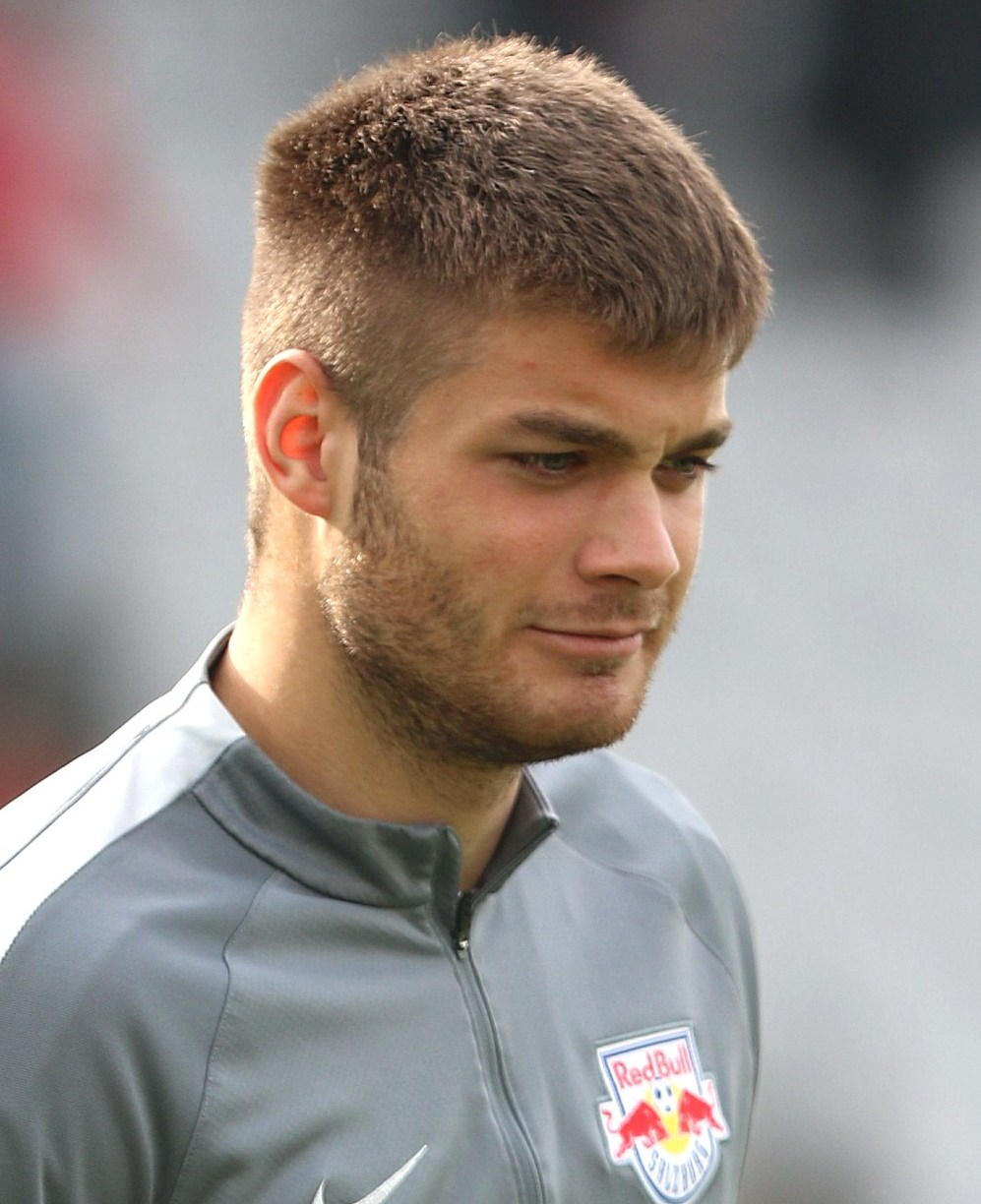
Duje Ćaleta-Car made 19 appearances for Southampton.

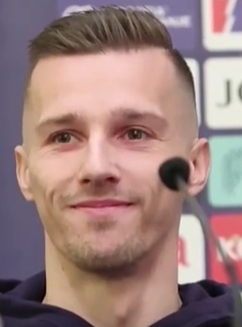
Mislav Oršić was part of the Croatia squad who finished 3rd at the 2022 FIFA World Cup.

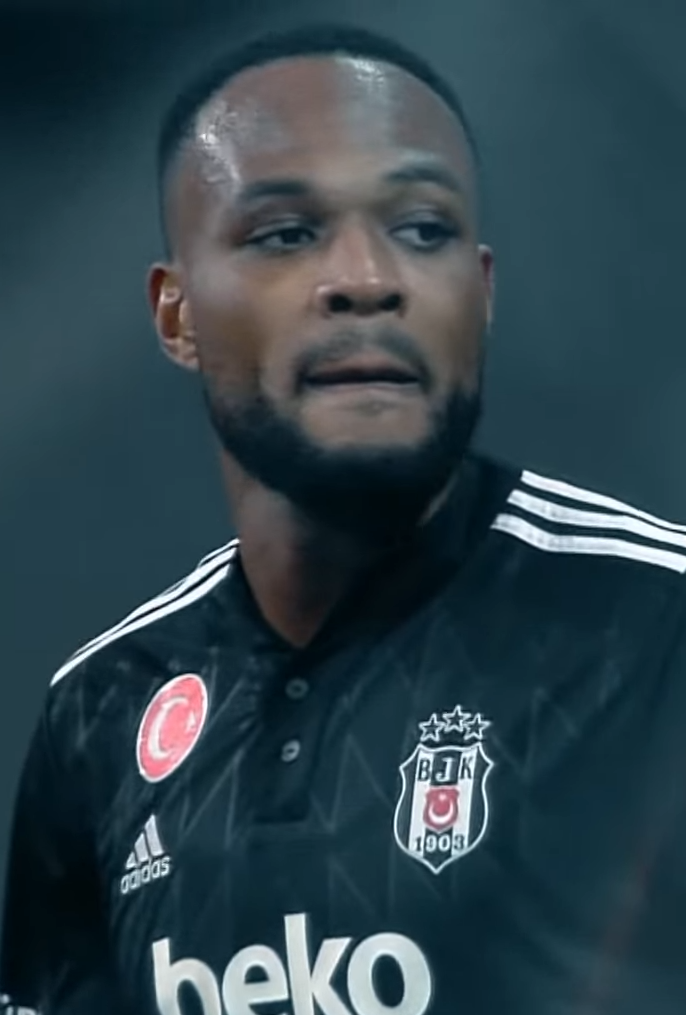
Cyle Larin scored nine goals in his 22 appearances for the club.

List of Southampton F.C. players with fewer than 25 appearances
Player	Nationality	Pos	Club career	Starts	Subs	Total	Goals
Player	Nationality	Pos	Club career	Appearances			Goals
Ned Bromley	England	FW	1887–1889	12	—N/a	12	10
Frederic Crossley	England	HB	1887–1888	4	—N/a	4	0
Charlie Deacon	England	HB	1887–1892	23	—N/a	23	3
Alfred Fry	England	HB	1887	2	—N/a	2	0
Arthur Fry	England	FW	1887–1891	15	—N/a	15	7
Alfred Gandy	England	FW	1887–1888	6	—N/a	6	1
George Muir	England	FB	1887–1889	7	—N/a	7	0
William Sommerville	England	FW	1887–1888	4	—N/a	4	0
Alf Varley	England	HB	1887–1888	5	—N/a	5	0
Monty Warn	England	FW	1887–1890	17	—N/a	17	6
Frank Bromley	England	FW	1888–1891	11	—N/a	11	8
Bob MacDonald	Scotland	FW	1888	4	—N/a	4	4
Freeman Delamotte	England	FW	1888–1893	20	—N/a	20	6
Ernest Mate	England	FW	1888	1	—N/a	1	0
John Arter	England	FB	1889	5	—N/a	5	1
G. Williams	England	HB	1889	1	—N/a	1	0
George Brown	England	HB	1889	1	—N/a	1	0
Bob Kiddle	England	FW	1889–1895	22	—N/a	22	6
Arthur Denning	England	?	1890–1894	2	—N/a	2	0
Bill Measures	England	HB	1890–1891	2	—N/a	2	0
William Duff	England	FB	1890	2	—N/a	2	0
Ernie Nicholls	England	FW	1891–1892; 1893–1894	24	—N/a	24	16
Arthur Mulford	England	FW	1891–1892	5	—N/a	5	1
Jock Fleming	Scotland	FW	1891	1	—N/a	1	3
Sandy McMillan	Scotland	HB	1891	1	—N/a	1	0
Francis Ellaby	England	FW	1892	1	—N/a	1	0
David Hamer	Wales	FB	1892; 1984–1895; 1898	13	—N/a	13	1
Richard Richardson	England	FW	1892	1	—N/a	1	0
Bob Bailey	England	HB	1892	2	—N/a	2	0
Jack Dollin	England	FW	1892–1893	6	—N/a	6	2
Robert Gilchrist	England	FW	1892	2	—N/a	2	0
William Peck	England	FW	1892	1	—N/a	1	0
George Ridges	England	FW	1892	1	—N/a	1	0
Bill Boyd	Scotland	HB	1892	1	—N/a	1	0
Joseph Price	Scotland	FB	1892–1893	6	—N/a	6	0
Victor Barton	England	GK	1893	1	—N/a	1	0
Arthur Nineham	England	FW	1893–1895	23	—N/a	23	9
Jack Dorkin	England	FW	1893–1895	22	—N/a	22	20
Charles William Miller	Brazil	FW	1893–1894	4	—N/a	4	0
Jack Barrett	England	GK	1894–1895	12	—N/a	12	0
Matthew Marshall	England	HB	1894	1	—N/a	1	0
Fred Frampton	England	HB	1894	1	—N/a	1	0
Fred Hollands	England	FW	1894–1895	24	—N/a	24	6
Bill Furby	England	HB	1894–1895	8	—N/a	8	0
Walter Cox	England	GK	1894–1896	12	—N/a	12	0
William Jeffrey	England	FB	1894–1895	17	—N/a	17	0
Herbert Williamson	England	GK	1894–1895	16	—N/a	16	0
Joe Rogers	England	FB	1895–1896	17	—N/a	17	2
George Ward	England	FW	1895	1	—N/a	1	0
Jimmy Dale	England	HB	1895	5	—N/a	5	0
Tom Cain	England	GK	1895–1896	10	—N/a	10	0
Edwin Jarvis	England	GK	1895	0	1	1	0
Matt Reilly	Ireland	GK	1895–1896	2	—N/a	2	0
Victor Smith	England	HB	1896; 1900–1902	10	—N/a	10	0
George Seeley	England	FW	1896–1899	21	—N/a	21	1
Gunner Phillips	Scotland	FB	1896	1	—N/a	1	0
George Inglis	Scotland	HB	1896	1	—N/a	1	0
Donald McKay	Scotland	FB	1896	9	—N/a	9	0
John McKie	Scotland	FB	1896–1897	12	—N/a	12	0
Ted Shenton	England	FW	1897	1	—N/a	1	1
John Spellacy	England	FW	1897	1	—N/a	1	0
Fred Hayter	England	FW	1897	2	—N/a	2	0
William Ponting	England	HB	1897–1898	8	—N/a	8	0
Septimus Blair	England	?	1897	1	—N/a	1	0
Jack Reynolds	England	HB	1898	7	—N/a	7	0
Walter Triggs	England	FB	1898; 1902	6	—N/a	6	0
Fred Bickell	England	GK	1898	1	—N/a	1	0
Owen Thomas	England	FB	1898–1899	5	—N/a	5	1
John Cust	Scotland	?	1898–1899	7	—N/a	7	0
Duncan McLean	Scotland	FW	1898–1899	22	—N/a	22	9
Walter Joyce	England	FW	1898–1900	2	—N/a	2	0
James Steele	England	FW	1898	1	—N/a	1	0
Albert Salmon	England	FW	1898	1	—N/a	1	0
Jim McKenzie	Scotland	FW	1898	15	—N/a	15	3
Tom Smith	England	FW	1898–1899	24	—N/a	24	6
Geordie Dewar	Scotland	HB	1898–1899	14	—N/a	14	0
Walter Fairgrieve	Scotland	FW	1898	4	—N/a	4	0
John Joyce	England	GK	1898–1900	19	—N/a	19	0
Frank Englefield	England	FW	1898–1900	9	—N/a	9	1
James Morty	England	HB	1898	1	—N/a	1	0
Don Greenlees	Scotland	HB	1899–1900	18	—N/a	18	0
Sid Cavendish	England	FW	1900–1902	21	—N/a	21	6
Joe French	England	HB	1900–1901	11	—N/a	11	0
Bill Crabb	England	FB	1900	3	—N/a	3	0
Ernest Gill	England	FB	1900	1	—N/a	1	0
Fred Harmsworth	England	HB	1900	1	—N/a	1	0
Henry Smoker	England	FW	1900–1904	3	—N/a	3	0
George Scott	England	FW	1900	1	—N/a	1	0
Arthur Blackburn	England	FB	1900–1901	15	—N/a	15	0
Wilf Waller	England	GK	1900	4	—N/a	4	0
Ralph Wildig	England	GK	1900–1901	2	—N/a	2	0
Ted Killean	England	HB	1900–1901	14	—N/a	14	1
Charles Ball	England	FW	1900–1901	3	—N/a	3	0
Frank Moore	England	FW	1900	1	—N/a	1	0
Henry Small	England	FW	1900	16	—N/a	16	4
Francis Chick	England	?	1901	2	—N/a	2	0
Bill Travers	England	FW	1901	2	—N/a	2	0
George Martin	England	FB	1901	1	—N/a	1	0
Jack McNee	Scotland	FW	1901	1	—N/a	1	0
Alex McDonald	Scotland	FW	1901	12	—N/a	12	8
Peter Desbrow	England	FB	1901	1	—N/a	1	0
James McGuigan	Scotland	HB	1901	1	—N/a	1	0
Geoffrey Wilson	England	FW	1901	4	—N/a	4	0
William Whiting	England	HB	1902–1905	17	—N/a	17	0
Claude Howland	England	FB	1902	2	—N/a	2	0
Bill George	England	FW	1902–1903	3	—N/a	3	0
George Northey	England	FW	1902	2	—N/a	2	0
Jack Fitchett	England	HB	1902–1903	20	—N/a	20	3
Mark Bell	Scotland	FW	1902–1903	23	—N/a	23	9
Joe Hoare	England	FB	1902–1903; 1904; 1907	16	—N/a	16	0
Bill Bundy	England	FW	1903	2	—N/a	2	1
Ernest Pike	England	FB	1903	1	—N/a	1	0
George Spence	Scotland	FW	1903–1904	23	—N/a	23	6
Michael Byrne	England	GK	1904–1905	6	—N/a	6	0
Arthur Coleman	India	?	1904	1	—N/a	1	0
Tom Metcalf	England	HB	1904–1905	9	—N/a	9	1
Edward Usher	England	?	1904	1	—N/a	1	0
Hector Shand	Scotland	FW	1904	2	—N/a	2	0
Dan Gordon	Scotland	FB	1904–1905; 1911–1912	24	—N/a	24	0
Fred Haxton	England	HB	1904–1905	8	—N/a	8	0
Charlie York	Scotland	FW	1905	3	—N/a	3	0
Fred Coham	England	?	1905	1	—N/a	1	0
Tom Edmond	Scotland	HB	1905–1906	14	—N/a	14	0
Sid Johnston	Northern Ireland	HB	1905	1	—N/a	1	0
Bill Stead	England	GK	1905–1906	6	—N/a	6	0
Walter Toomer	England	HB	1906–1913	15	—N/a	15	0
Joe Blacktin	England	FB	1906	2	—N/a	2	0
Ned Liddle	England	HB	1906	6	—N/a	6	0
Henry Richman	England	FW	1906	1	—N/a	1	1
Wally Radford	England	FW	1906–1907	13	—N/a	13	4
Robert McLean	Scotland	HB	1906–1907	7	—N/a	7	0
Frank Everist	England	FW	1906–1907	9	—N/a	9	2
Victor Norbury	England	HB	1906–1907	5	—N/a	5	0
Jim Angell	England	HB	1906	4	—N/a	4	0
John Cotton	England	FB	1906	1	—N/a	1	0
John McConnachie	Scotland	FB	1906	1	—N/a	1	0
Sam Greenhalgh	England	HB	1906	1	—N/a	1	0
John Harris	England	HB	1907	3	—N/a	3	0
John Patten	England	FW	1907	5	—N/a	5	2
Bert Dyer	England	FW	1907	1	—N/a	1	0
Edward Bell	Gibraltar	FW	1907–1908	8	—N/a	8	1
George Beare	England	FW	1907–1908	2	—N/a	2	1
George Smith	England	HB	1907–1912	20	—N/a	20	0
Tom Jaques	England	FW	1907	2	—N/a	2	0
Phil Mead	England	GK	1907	1	—N/a	1	0
Frederick Bird	England	HB	1908	3	—N/a	3	0
Bill McPherson	Scotland	FW	1908	1	—N/a	1	1
Stan Smith	England	FW	1908–1911	16	—N/a	16	1
George McGhee	England	FW	1908	4	—N/a	4	2
Alf Ward	England	FW	1908–1909	8	—N/a	8	3
John Dawson	England	FB	1908	2	—N/a	2	0
Charles Ireland	England	FW	1909	1	—N/a	1	0
Stan Welsh	England	FW	1909	1	—N/a	1	0
Harry Bamford	England	HB	1909–1911	11	—N/a	11	0
Jack Foster	England	FW	1909	8	—N/a	8	2
Andrew Davidson	Scotland	HB	1909	7	—N/a	7	0
Tom Davies	England	FW	1909–1910	10	—N/a	10	1
Sam Brittleton	England	FW	1909–1910	19	—N/a	19	4
Tom Clark	England	FW	1909–1910; 1912	6	—N/a	6	1
George Brown	England	FB	1910	2	—N/a	2	0
Charles Moon	England	FW	1910	1	—N/a	1	0
Bill Buckenham	England	FW	1910	7	—N/a	7	3
Jim Goodchild	England	GK	1910–1911	5	—N/a	5	0
Charles McKeer	England	HB	1910–1911	5	—N/a	5	0
Tom Hargreaves	England	FW	1910	1	—N/a	1	0
Frank Monk	England	HB	1910–1912	21	—N/a	21	0
Fred Wheeler	England	FW	1910	3	—N/a	3	0
John Coham	England	FW	1911	7	—N/a	7	0
Frank Grayer	England	FB	1911	7	—N/a	7	0
Baven Penton	England	FW	1911–1912	18	—N/a	18	5
Donald Slade	England	FW	1911	4	—N/a	4	1
Arthur Southern	England	FW	1911	3	—N/a	3	1
Joe Curry	England	HB	1911–1912	9	—N/a	9	0
Andrew Gibson	Scotland	FW	1911–1912	19	—N/a	19	3
Charlie Sheeran	Wales	FW	1911–1912	2	—N/a	2	0
Matthew Nihan	Ireland	FW	1912	2	—N/a	2	0
Cecil Christmas	England	FW	1912–1913	12	—N/a	12	0
Leonard Dawe	England	FW	1912–1913	11	—N/a	11	3
Bill Blackmore	England	FW	1912	2	—N/a	2	0
Sidney Rowthorn	England	FB	1912–1914	5	—N/a	5	0
Charles Tyson	England	HB	1912–1913	16	—N/a	16	0
Bill Dobson	England	FB	1912	4	—N/a	4	0
Ernest Williams	England	FW	1912	1	—N/a	1	0
Bill Wiggins	England	FW	1912	1	—N/a	1	0
Ernest Oatley	England	FW	1912	1	—N/a	1	0
John Sibley	England	FW	1912	1	—N/a	1	0
Len Wheeler	England	FW	1912; 1914	2	—N/a	2	0
Charles Cunningham	England	FW	1912	1	—N/a	1	0
Arthur Diaper	England	HB	1913–1914	7	—N/a	7	0
Herbert Parsons	England	FW	1913	2	—N/a	2	0
Edward Clements	England	FW	1913	1	—N/a	1	0
Charlie Jenkins	England	FB	1913	1	—N/a	1	0
Jack Barringer	England	HB	1913	1	—N/a	1	0
Lewis Richard Lewis	Wales	FW	1913	1	—N/a	1	0
Harry Hunter	England	GK	1913	1	—N/a	1	0
Bob Browning	England	FW	1913	6	—N/a	6	0
Sidney Selston	England	FW	1913	4	—N/a	4	0
Bill Sanders	Canada	FW	1913	3	—N/a	3	0
Bill Bradley	England	FW	1913–1914	7	—N/a	7	4
Robert Bennett	Ireland	FB	1913	1	—N/a	1	0
Tom Binder	England	FW	1913–1914	22	—N/a	22	2
George Hardie	England	FW	1913	1	—N/a	1	0
Arthur Pothecary	England	FW	1913–1914	4	—N/a	4	0
Fred Smith	England	FB	1913–1914	24	—N/a	24	0
Harrison Eke	England	FW	1913	1	—N/a	1	0
Fred Bright	England	?	1913–1914	3	—N/a	3	0
John Hinton	England	FW	1913–1915	5	—N/a	5	3
Robert Porter	England	FB	1913	2	—N/a	2	0
Bert Youtman	England	FW	1913	1	—N/a	1	0
Reg Slade	England	FB	1913–1915	6	—N/a	6	0
Arthur Buckley	England	FW	1914	5	—N/a	5	0
Tom Norris	England	FW	1914	1	—N/a	1	0
Percy Young	England	FW	1914	3	—N/a	3	0
Arthur Hollins	England	FW	1914–1915	21	—N/a	21	13
Bertie Barnes	England	FW	1914	1	—N/a	1	0
George Green	England	FB	1914–1915	19	—N/a	19	0
George Mounsey	England	HB	1914	1	—N/a	1	0
Harry Hall	England	FW	1914–1915	2	—N/a	2	0
George Crick	England	HB	1915	9	—N/a	9	0
Fred Loasby	England	FB	1915	2	—N/a	2	0
Bert Fenwick	England	HB	1919	11	—N/a	11	0
George Jones	England	FW	1919–1920	7	—N/a	7	5
Tony Donnelly	England	FB	1919	1	—N/a	1	0
Ken Boyes	England	FW	1919–1922	10	—N/a	10	1
Arthur Andrews	England	HB	1919–1920	12	—N/a	12	0
George Wilcock	Scotland	GK	1919–1920	22	—N/a	22	0
Arthur Gumbley	England	FW	1920	1	—N/a	1	0
George Williams	England	FW	1920	3	—N/a	3	1
George Reader	England	FW	1920–1921	3	—N/a	3	0
Frank Wright	England	FW	1920	1	—N/a	1	0
George Moorhead	Ireland	HB	1920–1921	14	—N/a	14	0
Harry Hooper	England	FB	1921–1925	21	—N/a	21	0
John Horton	England	FW	1921	1	—N/a	1	0
John Cooper	England	FW	1921–1922	5	—N/a	5	0
Sammy Meston	England	FW	1922–1926	10	—N/a	10	2
Joe Clark	England	FW	1922–1923	22	—N/a	22	0
Robert Blyth	Scotland	FW	1922–1923	9	—N/a	9	0
Willie McCall	Scotland	FW	1923	8	—N/a	8	2
Alex Christie	Scotland	HB	1923	5	—N/a	5	0
Harold Pearson	England	FW	1923	8	—N/a	8	4
Les Bruton	England	FW	1923–1926	7	—N/a	7	0
Jock Salter	England	FW	1923	1	—N/a	1	0
Elias MacDonald	England	FW	1924	18	—N/a	18	0
John Callagher	Scotland	HB	1924	1	—N/a	1	0
Dennis Jones	England	HB	1924–1925	7	—N/a	7	0
Fred Price	England	FW	1924–1925	11	—N/a	11	0
Tommy Broad	England	FW	1924–1925	9	—N/a	9	0
Albert Barrett	England	HB	1925	1	—N/a	1	0
Harry Yeomans	England	GK	1925	14	—N/a	14	0
Len Hill	England	GK	1925–1926	11	—N/a	11	0
Ernest Turner	Wales	FW	1925–1926	16	—N/a	16	3
Ernie King	England	HB	1925–1926	2	—N/a	2	0
Frank Matthews	England	FW	1925–1926	19	—N/a	19	6
James Thitchener	England	GK	1926	1	—N/a	1	0
Alf Bishop	England	FW	1926	7	—N/a	7	0
Jim Swinden	England	FW	1927–1928	3	—N/a	3	0
Fred Lohse	England	FW	1927	2	—N/a	2	1
Jack Mitton	England	HB	1927–1928	8	—N/a	8	0
Charlie Petrie	England	FW	1927–1928	24	—N/a	24	7
George Thompson	England	GK	1927–1930	18	—N/a	18	0
Tommy Taylor	England	FW	1927–1929	9	—N/a	9	4
Ted Robinson	England	FB	1927	1	—N/a	1	0
James Ellison	England	FB	1928	1	—N/a	1	0
Tom Sloan	England	FW	1928	1	—N/a	1	0
Archie Waterston	Scotland	FW	1928–1929	7	—N/a	7	1
Douglas Vernon	England	FW	1929	5	—N/a	5	0
Reg Watson	England	FW	1929–1931	20	—N/a	20	5
Oswald Littler	England	FW	1929	12	—N/a	12	3
Bill Stoddart	England	HB	1929–1930	18	—N/a	18	0
Alex Sharp	Scotland	HB	1930	1	—N/a	1	0
Ernie Warren	England	FW	1930–1931	3	—N/a	3	0
Thomas Groves	England	FW	1930	1	—N/a	1	0
Laurie Cumming	Ireland	FW	1930–1931	21	—N/a	21	4
Billy Stage	England	FW	1930	4	—N/a	4	1
Peter Cowper	England	FW	1930–1932	5	—N/a	5	0
Arthur Haddleton	England	FW	1931–1932	19	—N/a	19	10
Bill Soffe	England	GK	1931	2	—N/a	2	0
Reg Thomas	England	FB	1931–1932	11	—N/a	11	0
Fred Allan	England	FW	1931	1	—N/a	1	0
Chris Crossley	England	FW	1931	1	—N/a	1	0
Sid Grover	England	FW	1931	1	—N/a	1	0
Henry O'Grady	England	FW	1931–1932	7	—N/a	7	2
Frank Osborne	England	FW	1931–1933	20	—N/a	20	0
Frank Matson	Wales	FW	1931	4	—N/a	4	0
Bill Charlton	England	FW	1932	2	—N/a	2	1
Henry Belcher	England	HB	1932	2	—N/a	2	0
Jimmy Harris	England	FW	1932	2	—N/a	2	0
Bob Foster	England	GK	1932	2	—N/a	2	0
Fred Dunmore	England	FW	1932	1	—N/a	1	0
Arthur Tilford	England	FB	1933	10	—N/a	10	0
Vivian Gibbins	England	FW	1933	2	—N/a	2	0
Joe Cummins	England	FW	1934	1	—N/a	1	0
Ben Burley	England	FW	1934	2	—N/a	2	0
Doug Rowe	England	FW	1934	2	—N/a	2	1
Alf Wheeler	England	FW	1934–1935	11	—N/a	11	6
James Horton	England	FW	1934–1935	5	—N/a	5	1
Bob Reid	England	FW	1935	1	—N/a	1	0
Walter Pollard	England	FW	1935–1936	24	—N/a	24	3
Ted Withers	England	FW	1935–1937	7	—N/a	7	0
Jack Gurry	England	HB	1935–1936	10	—N/a	10	0
Norman Catlin	England	FW	1935–1937	6	—N/a	6	0
Eugene Bernard	England	GK	1936	2	—N/a	2	0
Billy Boyd	Scotland	FW	1936–1937	19	—N/a	19	7
Bill Moore	Wales	HB	1936	1	—N/a	1	0
Henry Long	England	FW	1936–1937	6	—N/a	6	0
Bobby Whitelaw	Scotland	HB	1936–1937	19	—N/a	19	1
Alf Charles	Trinidad and Tobago	FB	1937	1	—N/a	1	0
Wilf Mayer	England	FW	1937–1938	14	—N/a	14	0
Lionel Bowen	England	FB	1937	2	—N/a	2	0
Sid Gueran	England	FW	1937	3	—N/a	3	0
Billy Dunn	Scotland	FW	1937–1938	15	—N/a	15	4
Alf Day	Wales	HB	1937–1938	22	—N/a	22	0
Benny Gaughran	Ireland	FW	1937	7	—N/a	7	4
Gerry Kelly	England	FW	1937–1939	20	—N/a	20	2
Jimmy Woolf	South Africa	FW	1937	1	—N/a	1	0
Jack Scott	England	HB	1937	1	—N/a	1	0
George Woodford	England	FB	1938	7	—N/a	7	0
Norman Chalk	England	HB	1938–1939	5	—N/a	5	0
Oswald Bowden	England	FW	1938	2	—N/a	2	0
Charlie Wilkinson	England	FB	1938–1939	3	—N/a	3	0
Fred Williams	England	FB	1938–1939	23	—N/a	23	0
Tom Carnaby	England	HB	1938–1939	16	—N/a	16	0
Frank Perfect	England	FB	1939	17	—N/a	17	0
Lawrence Wallace	England	FW	1939	1	—N/a	1	0
Stan Cutting	England	HB	1939	3	—N/a	3	0
Bill Clarke	England	FW	1939	2	—N/a	2	0
Phil Griggs	England	FW	1939	1	—N/a	1	0
Doug McGibbon	England	FW	1939–1946	16	—N/a	16	11
Norman Higham	England	FW	1939	2	—N/a	2	2
Robert Perrett	England	FW	1939	3	—N/a	3	0
Bill Dodgin	England	HB	1939–1946	6	—N/a	6	0
Harry Evans	England	FW	1946	5	—N/a	5	0
Albie Roles	England	FB	1946	5	—N/a	5	0
Bill Bushby	England	HB	1946–1947	2	—N/a	2	0
Alf Freeman	England	FW	1946–1947	7	—N/a	7	2
George Horsfall	Australia	HB	1947	2	—N/a	2	0
Tommy Rudkin	England	FW	1947–1948	10	—N/a	10	0
George Beattie	Scotland	FW	1947	1	—N/a	1	0
Billy Wrigglesworth	England	FW	1947–1948	14	—N/a	14	4
José Gallego	Spain	FW	1948	1	—N/a	1	0
Bill Heaton	England	FW	1949	15	—N/a	15	0
Roland Wheatley	England	FW	1949–1951	12	—N/a	12	1
Bill Molloy	England	FW	1949	1	—N/a	1	0
Ernie Stevenson	England	FW	1950–1951	23	—N/a	23	8
Alex Anderson	Scotland	FB	1950–1951	20	—N/a	20	0
Norman Kirkman	England	FB	1950–1951	22	—N/a	22	0
John Mitchell	England	FW	1950	7	—N/a	7	0
Eddie Thomas	England	GK	1950–1951	8	—N/a	8	0
Ken Wilkins	England	FW	1951	2	—N/a	2	1
Tommy Bogan	Scotland	FW	1951–1953	9	—N/a	9	2
Jack McDonald	England	FW	1952–1953	16	—N/a	16	4
Tom McGarrity	Scotland	FW	1952–1953	5	—N/a	5	1
Derek Digby	England	FW	1953–1954	15	—N/a	15	2
Roy Oakley	England	HB	1953–1954	6	—N/a	6	0
Fred Turner	England	FB	1953–1955	21	—N/a	21	0
Jim Whittle	Scotland	FW	1954	2	—N/a	2	0
Len Gaynor	England	FW	1954	12	—N/a	12	1
Peter Brown	England	FW	1954–1957	16	—N/a	16	3
Billy Foulkes	Wales	FW	1954–1955	23	—N/a	23	1
Dave Gunter	England	FB	1955–1956	7	—N/a	7	0
Brian Bedford	Wales	FW	1956	5	—N/a	5	2
Doug Logan	Scotland	FB	1956–1957	23	—N/a	23	0
Mervyn Gill	England	GK	1956	1	—N/a	1	0
Dickie Dowsett	England	FW	1956–1957	3	—N/a	3	0
Brian Stevens	England	HB	1957–1958	13	—N/a	13	0
Barry Hillier	England	FB	1957–1959	9	—N/a	9	0
Graham Clarke	England	FB	1957–1959	3	—N/a	3	0
Sam Stevens	Scotland	HB	1958–1959	16	—N/a	16	0
Wes Maughan	England	FW	1959–1961	8	—N/a	8	1
Denis Pring	Wales	FW	1959	4	—N/a	4	0
Peter Vine	England	FW	1959	1	—N/a	1	0
Paddy Kennedy	Ireland	FB	1959	2	—N/a	2	0
Bernard Harrison	England	FW	1959	3	—N/a	3	1
Dave Scurr	England	HB	1960–1961	4	—N/a	4	0
Gordon Brown	England	FW	1960	9	—N/a	9	2
Bernard Pask	England	FW	1960	1	—N/a	1	0
Colin Holmes	England	HB	1960	1	—N/a	1	0
Tony Heaney	England	DF	1960	1	—N/a	1	1
Hugh Lindsay	England	FW	1961	2	—N/a	2	0
Mike Hennigan	England	DF	1963–1964	3	—N/a	3	0
Norman Dean	England	FW	1963–1966	20	0	20	11
David Paton	Scotland	HB	1964–1968	15	0	15	0
Richard Davis	England	DF	1965	1	—N/a	1	0
Tommy Hare	Scotland	DF	1965–1966	14	0	14	0
Tommy Spencer	Scotland	FW	1966	3	0	3	0
Mick Judd	England	FW	1968–1969	14	1	15	3
Les Harfield	England	FW	1971	2	0	2	1
Sandy Davie	Scotland	GK	1971	1	0	1	0
Graham Lovett	England	MF	1971	3	0	3	0
Wayne Talkes	England	MF	1972–1973	7	3	10	0
Francis Burns	Scotland	DF	1972–1973	23	1	24	1
Bill Beaney	England	DF	1973–1974	3	1	4	0
Terry Spinner	England	FW	1973–1974	1	1	2	0
Ally McLeod	Scotland	FW	1973–1974	3	3	6	0
Mike Earls	Ireland	DF	1974	8	0	8	0
Lew Chatterley	England	MF	1974	10	3	13	1
Pat Earles	England	FW	1974	6	11	17	2
John Crabbe	England	MF	1975	9	4	13	0
Steve Neville	England	MF	1975–1978	6	2	8	1
Mike Berry	England	DF	1975	2	0	2	0
Colin Boulton	England	GK	1976	6	0	6	0
Jimmy Montgomery	England	GK	1976	5	0	5	0
Forbes Phillipson-Masters	England	DF	1977	10	0	10	0
John Sharpe	England	DF	1977–1978	22	0	22	0
Tim Coak	England	DF	1977–1978	6	0	6	0
Tony Funnell	England	FW	1977–1978	14	6	20	9
Tony Sealy	England	FW	1978–1979	2	6	8	0
Oshor Williams	England	MF	1979	4	1	5	0
Kevin Dawtry	England	MF	1979	1	0	1	0
George Shipley	England	MF	1979	2	2	4	0
Martin McGrath	England	MF	1980	0	1	1	0
Andy Rogers	England	MF	1980–1981	0	5	5	0
Mike McCartney	Scotland	DF	1980–1981	24	0	24	1
Wayne Pratt	England	MF	1980	1	0	1	0
Justin Fashanu	England	FW	1982	9	1	10	3
Martin Foyle	England	FW	1983–1984	7	8	15	3
Ian Baird	England	FW	1983–1985	21	3	24	5
Alistair Sperring	England	GK	1983	1	0	1	0
Ian Juryeff	England	FW	1983	0	2	2	0
Eamonn Collins	Republic of Ireland	MF	1984–1985	2	3	5	0
Phil Kite	England	GK	1984–1985	5	0	5	0
Stuart McManus	Scotland	FW	1986	2	0	2	1
Allen Tankard	England	DF	1986–1987	7	0	7	0
Keith Granger	England	GK	1986	2	0	2	0
Eric Nixon	England	GK	1986–1987	4	0	4	0
Andy Cook	England	DF	1987–1991	17	5	22	1
Steve Davis	England	DF	1990–1991	5	1	6	0
Sammy Lee	England	MF	1990	0	3	3	0
Ian Andrews	England	GK	1990–1993	20	1	21	0
Sergey Gotsmanov	Belarus	MF	1990–1991	8	6	14	0
Lee Powell	Wales	FW	1990–1993	2	7	9	0
Paul Moody	England	FW	1991–1993	8	6	14	0
David Lee	England	MF	1991–1992	12	11	23	0
Stuart Gray	England	MF	1991–1992	20	2	22	1
Michael Gilkes	Barbados	MF	1992	4	2	6	0
Matthew Bound	England	DF	1992–1994	2	3	5	0
Kerry Dixon	England	FW	1992–1993	11	1	12	2
David Speedie	Scotland	FW	1992	12	0	12	0
Perry Groves	England	MF	1992–1993	15	3	18	2
Derek Allan	Scotland	DF	1993	0	1	1	0
Neal Bartlett	England	MF	1993	4	12	16	0
Frankie Bennett	England	FW	1993–1996	6	17	23	1
Peter Reid	England	MF	1993	8	0	8	0
Colin Cramb	Scotland	FW	1993	0	1	1	0
Peter Whiston	England	DF	1994	0	1	1	0
Ronnie Ekelund	Denmark	MF	1994–1995	17	3	20	5
Paul Tisdale	Malta	MF	1994–1996	5	12	17	1
Paul McDonald	Scotland	DF	1994–1996	0	4	4	0
Matthew Robinson	England	DF	1995–1997	4	13	17	0
Christer Warren	England	MF	1995–1997	2	7	9	0
Mark Walters	England	MF	1996	8	1	9	0
Steve Basham	England	FW	1996–1998	1	19	20	1
Graham Potter	England	DF	1996	3	7	10	0
Russell Watkinson	England	MF	1996	0	3	3	0
Chris Woods	England	GK	1996	6	0	6	0
Ali Dia	Senegal	FW	1996	0	1	1	0
Maik Taylor	Northern Ireland	GK	1997	18	0	18	0
Stig Johansen	Norway	FW	1997	4	4	8	0
Lee Todd	England	DF	1997–1998	10	1	11	0
Duncan Spedding	England	MF	1997–1998	4	4	8	0
Jason Bowen	Wales	FW	1997	1	2	3	0
John Beresford	England	DF	1998–2000	11	6	17	0
Kevin Gibbens	England	MF	1998–2001	8	4	12	0
Phil Warner	England	DF	1998	6	1	7	0
David Howells	England	MF	1998–1999	10	2	12	1
Scott Marshall	Scotland	DF	1998	2	0	2	0
Garry Monk	England	DF	1998–2003	10	3	13	0
Shayne Bradley	England	FW	1998–1999	0	4	4	0
Luís Boa Morte	Portugal	MF	1999–2000	7	10	17	1
Marco Almeida	Portugal	DF	1999	0	1	1	0
Dani Rodrigues	Portugal	MF	2000	0	2	2	0
Ryan Ashford	England	DF	2000	1	0	1	0
Imants Bleidelis	Latvia	MF	2000–2002	1	4	5	0
Dan Petrescu	Romania	DF	2001	8	3	11	2
Paul Murray	England	MF	2001	0	1	1	0
Scott McDonald	Australia	FW	2001	1	2	3	0
Agustín Delgado	Ecuador	FW	2002–2004	5	10	15	2
Andrei Kanchelskis	Russia	MF	2002	0	2	2	0
Léandre Griffit	France	MF	2003–2004	2	6	8	2
Fitz Hall	England	DF	2003–2004	8	4	12	0
Stephen Crainey	Scotland	DF	2004	5	0	5	0
Yoann Folly	Togo	MF	2004–2006	14	4	18	0
Alan Blayney	Northern Ireland	GK	2004	4	0	4	0
Mikael Nilsson	Sweden	MF	2004–2005	17	4	21	0
Jelle Van Damme	Belgium	DF	2004–2005	6	3	9	0
Leon Best	Republic of Ireland	FW	2004–2007	9	8	17	4
Calum Davenport	England	DF	2005	9	3	12	0
Jamie Redknapp	England	MF	2005	17	0	17	1
Paul Smith	England	GK	2005–2006	20	1	21	0
Olivier Bernard	France	DF	2005	15	1	16	0
Henri Camara	Senegal	FW	2005	12	4	16	6
Tomasz Hajto	Poland	DF	2005–2006	16	5	21	0
Dennis Wise	England	DF	2005–2006	8	4	12	1
Matt Mills	England	DF	2005–2006	5	1	6	0
Kamil Kosowski	Poland	MF	2005–2006	12	6	18	1
Jim Brennan	Canada	DF	2006	15	1	16	0
Darren Potter	Republic of Ireland	MF	2006	9	3	12	0
Peter Madsen	Denmark	FW	2006	9	1	10	2
Kevin Miller	England	GK	2006	7	0	7	0
Marcelo Sarmiento	Argentina	MF	2006–2007	3	1	4	0
Danny Guthrie	England	MF	2007	10	2	12	0
Alan Bennett	Republic of Ireland	DF	2007–2008	11	0	11	0
Grégory Vignal	France	DF	2007–2008	22	1	23	4
Christian Dailly	Scotland	DF	2007	11	1	12	0
Stephen O'Halloran	Republic of Ireland	DF	2008	0	1	1	0
Ian Pearce	England	DF	2008	1	0	1	0
Cédric Baseya	DR Congo	FW	2008	0	1	1	0
Michael Poke	England	GK	2008	3	1	4	0
Vincent Péricard	France	FW	2008	1	4	5	0
Richard Wright	England	GK	2008	7	0	7	0
Chris Lucketti	England	DF	2008	4	0	4	0
Jake Thomson	Trinidad and Tobago	MF	2008–2009	7	9	16	0
Jamie White	England	FW	2008	2	1	3	0
Olly Lancashire	England	DF	2008–2010	13	4	17	0
Tomáš Pekhart	Czech Republic	FW	2008	2	8	10	1
Matt Paterson	Scotland	FW	2008–2010	7	15	22	2
Jordan Robertson	England	FW	2008	8	2	10	1
Ryan Smith	England	MF	2008–2009	8	6	14	0
Alex Pearce	Republic of Ireland	DF	2008	6	3	9	2
Romain Gasmi	France	FW	2008–2009	0	4	4	0
Kayne McLaggon	Wales	FW	2008–2009	1	7	8	1
Lee Molyneux	England	DF	2009	4	0	4	1
Jan-Paul Saeijs	Netherlands	DF	2009	20	0	20	2
Zoltán Lipták	Hungary	DF	2009	0	7	7	0
Graeme Murty	Scotland	DF	2009	8	1	9	0
Jacob Mellis	England	MF	2009	9	5	14	0
Neal Trotman	England	DF	2009	18	2	20	2
Jon Otsemobor	England	DF	2010	19	0	19	0
Callum McNish	England	MF	2010	0	1	1	0
Nicholas Bignall	England	FW	2010	0	3	3	0
Dany N'Guessan	France	FW	2011	2	5	7	0
Jonathan Forte	Barbados	FW	2011–2012	5	10	15	4
Dale Stephens	England	MF	2011	5	1	6	0
Sam Hoskins	England	MF	2011–2012	0	5	5	0
Ben Reeves	Northern Ireland	MF	2011–2012	4	9	13	1
Ryan Doble	Wales	MF	2012	1	0	1	0
Iago Falque	Spain	MF	2012	1	0	1	0
Tadanari Lee	Japan	FW	2012–2013	9	5	14	2
Billy Sharp	England	FW	2012	12	6	18	10
Paulo Gazzaniga	Argentina	GK	2012–2015	22	1	23	0
Emmanuel Mayuka	Zambia	FW	2012–2014	3	16	19	1
Andy Robinson	England	MF	2012	0	1	1	0
Lloyd Isgrove	Wales	MF	2012–2017	4	4	8	0
Omar Rowe	England	MF	2013	0	2	2	0
Jake Sinclair	England	FW	2013	0	1	1	0
Florin Gardoș	Romania	DF	2014–2017	12	6	18	0
Jake Hesketh	England	MF	2014–2016	3	1	4	1
Dominic Gape	England	MF	2014	0	1	1	0
Jason McCarthy	England	DF	2014	0	1	1	0
Eljero Elia	Netherlands	FW	2015	10	7	17	2
Ryan Seager	England	FW	2015	0	2	2	0
Filip Đuričić	Serbia	MF	2015	3	6	9	0
Juanmi	Spain	FW	2015–2016	2	17	19	0
Steven Caulker	England	DF	2015	6	2	8	0
Jérémy Pied	France	DF	2016–2018	4	4	8	0
Olufela Olomola	England	FW	2016	0	1	1	0
Harry Lewis	England	GK	2017	3	0	3	0
Martín Cáceres	Uruguay	DF	2017	1	0	1	0
Guido Carrillo	Argentina	FW	2018	7	3	10	0
Tyreke Johnson	England	MF	2018–2019	1	2	3	0
Kayne Ramsay	England	DF	2018–2021	3	1	4	0
Marcus Barnes	England	FW	2019	0	1	1	0
Callum Slattery	England	MF	2019	2	3	5	0
Kevin Danso	Austria	DF	2019–2020	7	3	10	0
Jake Vokins	England	DF	2019–2021	4	1	5	1
Dan Nlundulu	England	FW	2020–2021	1	15	16	1
Kegs Chauke	South Africa	MF	2021	1	0	1	0
Ryan Finnigan	England	MF	2021	0	1	1	0
Alex Jankewitz	Switzerland	MF	2021	1	2	3	0
Caleb Watts	Australia	MF	2021	1	3	4	0
Allan Tchaptchet	France	DF	2021	0	1	1	0
Takumi Minamino	Japan	MF	2021	9	1	10	2
Willy Caballero	Argentina	GK	2021–2023	5	0	5	0
Thierry Small	England	DF	2022	1	0	1	0
Dom Ballard	England	FW	2022–2023	0	4	4	1
Diamond Edwards	England	MF	2022	0	1	1	0
Lewis Payne	England	DF	2022	1	0	1	0
Juan Larios	Spain	DF	2022–2024	2	4	6	0
Duje Ćaleta-Car	Croatia	DF	2022–2023	14	5	19	2
Mislav Oršić	Croatia	MF	2023	3	2	5	0
Kamari Doyle	England	MF	2023	0	2	2	0
Sam Amo-Ameyaw	England	MF	2023–2024	4	8	12	1
Jayden Meghoma	England	DF	2023–2024	4	0	4	0
Mason Holgate	England	DF	2023–2024	6	1	7	0
Joe Lumley	England	GK	2024	8	0	8	0
Joe Rothwell	England	MF	2024	7	13	20	4
David Brooks	Wales	MF	2024	13	7	20	2
Ben Brereton Díaz	Chile	FW	2024–	6	11	17	0
Charlie Taylor	England	DF	2024–2025	5	7	12	0
Romeo Akachukwu	Republic of Ireland	MF	2024–	1	3	4	1
Ronnie Edwards	England	DF	2024–2025	12	4	16	0
Joe O'Brien-Whitmarsh	Republic of Ireland	MF	2024–2026	0	2	2	0
Maxwel Cornet	Ivory Coast	MF	2024	2	2	4	0
Albert Grønbæk	Denmark	MF	2025	2	3	5	0
Joachim Kayi Sanda	France	DF	2025–	0	2	2	0
Damion Downs	United States	FW	2025–	2	12	14	0
Joshua Quarshie	Germany	DF	2025–	15	3	18	0
Mads Roerslev	Denmark	DF	2025–	6	5	11	0
Moses Sesay	England	MF	2025–	0	1	1	0
Elias Jelert	Denmark	DF	2025–2026	6	5	11	0
Nicholas Oyekunle	England	FW	2025–	0	4	4	0
Barnaby Williams	England	MF	2025–	0	3	3	0
George Long	England	GK	2026–	1	0	1	0
Sufianu Sillah Dibaga	Spain	FW	2026–	0	1	1	0
Lewis Dobbin	England	FW	2026–	7	9	16	1
Divin Mubama	England	FW	2026–	2	13	15	2
Keven Schlotterbeck	Germany	DF	2026–	13	0	13	2
Zach Abbott	England	DF	2026–	2	1	3	0
