= 1896–97 Southampton St. Mary's F.C. season =

Southampton St. Mary's F.C.
1896–97 season
- President: Dr Henry William Russell Bencraft
- Secretary: Alfred McMinn
- Stadium: The County Ground
- Southern League: Champions
- FA Cup: Round 2
- Top goalscorer: League: Jack Farrell (13); All: Jack Farrell (20)
Home colours

The 1896–97 season was the twelfth since the foundation of Southampton St. Mary's F.C. and their third in league football, as members of the Southern League. The season was the most successful yet, with St. Mary's claiming the Southern League title for the first time and reaching the Second Round Proper of the FA Cup. It was the start of the most successful period in the club's history — in a period of eight years, they were Southern League champions six times and reached the final of the FA Cup twice.

== Pre-season ==
Following the closure of the Antelope Ground in April 1896, St. Mary's were forced to look for a new home. Thanks to the connections of their president Dr. H. W. R. Bencraft, who was also Hon. Secretary to Hampshire County Cricket Club, the club secured the use of The County Ground, at an annual rental of £200.

As St. Mary's were unrestricted by the maximum wages rule of the Football League they were able to "poach" players from League clubs by offering them higher pay. During the close-season, the Saints' committee signed several players who were keen to earn more money in the Southern League. Amongst the recruits were Robert Buchanan from Woolwich Arsenal and Harry Haynes from Small Heath, but the most significant signing was goalkeeper George Clawley who was signed from Stoke and began a long and illustrious career with the Saints.

Charles Robson resigned as secretary and was replaced by Alfred McMinn with Bill Dawson continuing as trainer and Ernest Arnfield becoming Assistant Secretary. The team kit was changed from red and white halves to red and white striped shirts with blue shorts; this basic design was to remain unchanged until the 1970s.

== League season ==
The 1896–97 season was the Saints' third in the Southern League, having finished in third place in each of the previous two seasons. The team started the league season with a run of nine consecutive victories, including defeating Sheppey United 6–1, New Brompton 8–3 and Reading 6–0 (all at home). From the New Year onwards, results were less predictable with the season often interrupted by the weather and the demands of the FA Cup, but the team remained undefeated throughout the league season finishing as champions, four points ahead of the defending champions, Millwall Athletic.

The championship was secured only in the penultimate match of the season on 14 April, a 2–1 victory over bottom club, Wolverton, with the two points earned putting St. Mary's out of the reach of their nearest rivals, Millwall. When the team returned by train to Southampton, they were greeted by a crowd, estimated at up to 15,000, at the Docks station accompanied by the police band.

The train was late and the crowd increased. When the team stepped on the platform the "Southampton whisper" (a shout, with great vigour, of "Yi! Yi! Yi!") gained such volume that it almost raised the station roof.

The team were then put into wagons and, with the band playing, were led by the crowd through the town to Kingsland Square where, after the band played the National Anthem, the crowd eventually dispersed.

The final match of the season was at the County Ground, against Millwall Athletic; Saints were anxious to maintain their unbeaten record and Millwall, who had gone through the 1894-95 season unbeaten, were equally keen to prevent the Saints from emulating that achievement. Millwall scored first early in the match, but Southampton fought back to equalise with a "brilliant shot" from Joe Turner following one of his "mesmerising dashes down the wing".

As team captain, Farrell received the Championship shield from Dr. Russell Bencraft, who was both president of the League and of the club, at a ceremony in the Artillery Drill Hall in Southampton. Each player received a gold medal, with mementoes also being presented to trainer Dawson and his assistant, Joyce.

== League results ==
Date	Opponents	H / A	Result F – A	Scorers
19 September 1896	Chatham Town	H	4 – 1	Farrell (2), Buchanan, Turner
26 September 1896	Sheppey United	H	6 – 1	Buchanan (3), Meston (2), Turner
18 October 1896	Wolverton L & NWR	H	5 – 2	Buchanan, Farrell, Haynes, Meston, Turner
24 October 1896	Northfleet	A	2 – 1	Farrell, McMillan
7 November 1896	New Brompton	H	8 – 3	Naughton (3), Buchanan (2), Littlehales (2), Farrell
14 November 1896	Reading	H	6 – 0	Turner (2), Hodgkinson, Keay, Naughton, Own goal
28 November 1896	Sheppey United	A	1 – 0	Own goal
5 December 1896	Swindon Town	A	2 – 0	Farrell, Naughton
19 December 1896	Chatham Town	A	1 – 0	Turner
16 January 1897	Gravesend United	A	1 – 1	Meston
6 February 1897	New Brompton	A	3 – 1	Farrell, Shenton, Turner
27 February 1897	Swindon Town	H	2 – 0	Farrell, Turner
6 March 1897	Millwall Athletic	A	0 – 0	
13 March 1897	Northfleet	H	6 – 2	Farrell (2), Keay (2), Buchanan, Turner
29 March 1897	Tottenham Hotspur	H	1 – 1	Littlehales
31 March 1897	Reading	A	5 – 1	Buchanan, Farrell, Haynes, Littlehales, Turner
8 April 1897	Tottenham Hotspur	A	2 – 2	Farrell, Keay
10 April 1897	Gravesend United	H	5 – 0	Buchanan (2), Farrell, Naughton, Turner
14 April 1897	Wolverton L & NWR	A	2 – 1	Keay, Littlehales
8 April 1897	Millwall Athletic	H	1 – 1	Turner

=== Legend ===
Win	Draw	Loss

=== Top of league table ===
Pos	Team	Pld	W	D	L	GF	GA	GAv	Pts
1	Southampton St.Mary's (Note: Changed name to Southampton at end of season)	20	15	5	0	63	18	3.500	35
2	Millwall Athletic	20	13	5	2	63	24	2.625	31
3	Chatham Town	20	13	1	6	54	29	1.862	27
4	Tottenham Hotspur	20	9	4	7	43	29	1.483	22
5	Gravesend United	20	9	4	7	35	34	1.029	22

Rules for classification: The system of using goal average to separate two teams tied on points was used until the 1976-77 season. The points system: 2 points for a win, 1 point for a draw and 0 points for losing.

== FA Cup ==
As the Saints had reached the First Round Proper in each of the previous two seasons, the FA exempted them from the first two of four qualifying rounds of the FA Cup.

In the Third Qualifying Round, St. Mary's were drawn away to their local rivals, Cowes. Several thousand travelled to the Isle of Wight to see the "Saints" comprehensively outplay Cowes, with Robert Buchanan, Jack Farrell and Joe Turner each scoring twice in a 6–0 victory. St. Mary's had to travel again in the next round, to visit Elm Park; on arriving at the stadium, the team found the pitch waterlogged. McMinn lodged a protest with the referee, who declared the pitch playable so the match went ahead with the Saints winning 4–1. As had happened several times before with matches between the two clubs, Reading protested to the FA who declared that the result should stand.

The next round brought a home tie against Swindon Town; despite Swindon scoring first, the Saints then ran riot with eight goals, with Farrell scoring a hat-trick. This put Southampton through to the First Round Proper for the third consecutive season, where they met Derbyshire club, Heanor Town. After a draw at the County Ground, the teams met in a replay on the following Wednesday. Heanor lost their winger, Hardy, with a broken leg and the Saints went through with a single goal from Farrell. Following the match, The Southern Daily Echo set up a fund for Hardy which raised £40.

In the Second Round, the Saints met Football League opposition with a tie against Newton Heath. A crowd of 8,000 saw St. Mary's hold their opponents to a 1–1 draw at the County Ground. Willie Naughton was injured for the replay and was replaced by James Spellacy, who was making his only first-team appearance; Naughton was badly missed and the Saints went out of the cup to goals from Bryant and Cassidy.

Date	Round	Opponents	H / A	Result F – A	Scorers	Attendance
21 November 1896	2nd Qualifying Round	Cowes	A	6 – 0	Buchanan (2), Farrell (2), Turner (2)	5,000
12 December 1896	3rd Qualifying Round	Reading	A	4 – 1	Buchanan (2), Farrell, Turner	5,000
2 January 1897	4th Qualifying Round	Swindon Town	H	8 – 2	Farrell (3), Littlehales, Hodgkinson, Keay, Turner, Buchanan	5,000
30 January 1897	Round 1 Proper	Heanor Town	H	1 – 1	Turner	8,500
3 February 1897	Round 1 Proper Replay	Heanor Town	A	1 – 0	Farrell	3,000
13 February 1897	Round 2 Proper	Newton Heath	H	1 – 1	Turner	8,000
17 February 1897	Round 2 Proper Replay	Newton Heath	A	1 – 3	Buchanan	7,000

== Friendly matches ==
With only ten home league matches in the season and the poor weather since Christmas, the Saints' committee organised several friendly matches in order to boost the club's finances. Over the whole season, the team played in excess of thirty friendly matches with a heavy programme of fixtures over Easter and up to the end of April, including several matches against opposition from the Football League.

On 22 March, they entertained a team for Sheffield Wednesday, who had defeated them in the previous season's FA Cup. This time, the Saints were victorious, by four goals to one. There were also victories over Darwen (2–0), Blackburn Rovers (4–1) and Derby County (7–3) with only Woolwich Arsenal winning, with a 5–1 scoreline.

== Merger proposals ==
At this time, the only other local professional football club was Freemantle, who had ended the 1896–97 season in a crisis, having been denied promotion to the Southern League First Division after they had used a player whose transfer had not been registered. As a result, the club was thrown into turmoil with both the treasurer and secretary resigning. At Freemantle's 1897 A.G.M. it was revealed that the club was in debt by over £200, and plans to incorporate the club into a limited company were abandoned.

At St. Mary's meanwhile, a sub-committee had been established to look into playing arrangements for the 1897–98 season, as the cost of hiring the County Ground from the Cricket club was prohibitive. The sub-committee's main brief was to negotiate terms for a further season at the County Ground, but it was also proposed that "enquiries be made as to the Freemantle ground".

At the Freemantle AGM on 21 May, the chairman produced a pamphlet proposing a merger with St. Mary's; although some club members objected to the proposal being discussed in the absence of the club president, Tankerville Chamberlayne (Member of Parliament for Southampton), it was agreed to meet with St. Mary's to discuss the proposals. The idea of a merger between the two clubs had attractions, especially as the rent on Freemantle's ground at Shirley was only £24 p.a. compared to £200 at the County Ground. Although delegations from both sides met to discuss the proposals, there was strong opposition and after much deliberation the St Mary's committee decided not to proceed.

On 11 June, the A.G.M. of St. Mary's agreed to reconstitute the club as a limited liability company. The members were also informed that "the committee had a ground in view". The ground, it emerged, was an abandoned, partly excavated, railway cutting known as "the dell".

== Limited company ==
On 8 July 1897, a meeting was held at the Bedford Hotel to agree the structure of the new company, Southampton Football & Athletic Company Limited. The first chairman of the new company was Dr. Ernest Stancomb (medical practitioner), with G.A.E. Hussey (brewer), H.M. Ashton (engineer), George Thomas (fish merchant) and George Payne (butcher) being elected as the first directors. Alfred McMinn was appointed as Hon. Secretary with Er Arnfield becoming "financial secretary or treasurer". Dr. Stancomb was charged with making the arrangements for the transfer from "St. Mary's F.C."

At a further meeting at the offices of the club's lawyers on 16 July, arrangements were made for the issue of shares, with Tankerville Chamberlayne being invited on to the board. By the time of the issue of the Memorandum of Association, R.B. Horne (dairyman), W. Newnham (law clerk), Edward Brown (butcher) and Charles Robson (mineral water merchant and wicket-keeper for Hampshire, who had been the St. Mary's club secretary in 1895–96) had been added to the list of directors.

One result of the change to limited company status was that, subject to approval from the Football Association, the club would in future be known as Southampton Football Club.

== Player statistics ==
Position	Nationality	Name	League apps	League goals	FA Cup apps	FA Cup goals	Total apps	Total goals
FW	Scotland	Robert Buchanan	20	11	7	6	27	17
GK	England	George Clawley	20	0	7	0	27	0
GK	England	Walter Cox	0	0	0	0	0	0
FW	England	Jack Farrell	20	13	7	7	27	20
FB	Wales	David Hamer	1	0	0	0	1	0
FB	England	Harry Haynes	16	2	1	0	17	2
FW	England	Fred Hayter ^{a}	2	0	0	0	2	0
HB	England	John Hodgkinson	13	1	7	1	20	2
FW	Scotland	Watty Keay	16	5	7	1	23	6
HB	England	Alf Littlehales	17	5	7	1	24	6
FB	Scotland	Donald McKay	8	0	0	0	8	0
FB	Scotland	James McKie	6	0	6	0	12	0
HB	Scotland	William McMillan	20	1	7	0	27	1
FB	Scotland	Samuel Meston	19	4	7	0	26	4
FW	Scotland	Willie Naughton	16	6	6	0	22	6
HB	England	William Ponting	5	0	0	0	5	0
FW	England	George Seeley	1	0	0	0	1	0
FW	England	George Shenton ^{b}	1	1	0	0	1	1
HB	England	Victor Smith	0	0	0	0	0	0
FW	England	James Spellacy ^{c}	0	0	1	0	1	0
FW	England	Joe Turner	19	12	7	6	26	18

=== Key ===
- GK — Goalkeeper
- FB — Full back
- HB — Half back
- FW — Forward

=== Notes ===
- ^a Fred Hayter was a Southampton born player, who was the regular reserve team inside-left. He replaced the injured Watty Keay for two matches in February. He was "capped" at county level.
- ^b George Shenton was an outside-right who made only one first team appearance, at New Brompton on 6 February 1887, in which he scored. He was "capped" at county level.
- ^c James Spellacy was an inside-right who made only one first team appearance, replacing the injured Willie Naughton in the FA Cup replay defeat at Newton Heath on 13 February 1887. He was "capped" at county level and also played for Cowes.

== Transfers ==
=== In ===
Date	Position	Name	From
Summer 1896	FW	Robert Buchanan	Woolwich Arsenal
Summer 1896	GK	George Clawley	Stoke
Summer 1896	FB	Harry Haynes	Small Heath
Summer 1896	FB	Donald McKay	Woolston Works
Summer 1896	FB	James McKie	Freemantle
March 1897	HB	William Ponting	Ryde
Summer 1896	FW	George Seeley	Local football

=== Departures ===
Date	Position	Name	To
April 1896	FB	Charles Baker	Retired
April 1896	GK	Tom Cain	Grimsby Town
Summer 1896	HB	Jimmy Dale	Retired
Summer 1896	FB	George Marshall	Retired
May 1896	FB	Joe Rogers	Grimsby Town
Summer 1896	HB	Ernie Taylor	Freemantle
Summer 1896	HB	Lachie Thomson	Cowes

== Bibliography ==
- Chalk, Gary; Holley, Duncan (1987). Saints – A complete record. Breedon Books. ISBN 0-907969-22-4.
- Holley, Duncan; Chalk, Gary (1992). The Alphabet of the Saints. ACL & Polar Publishing. ISBN 0-9514862-3-3.
- Juson, Dave; Bull, David (2001). Full-Time at The Dell. Hagiology Publishing. ISBN 0-9534474-2-1.
