= 1895–96 Southampton St. Mary's F.C. season =

Southampton St. Mary's F.C.
1895–96 season
- President: Dr Henry William Russell Bencraft
- Secretary: Charles Robson
- Stadium: Antelope Ground
- Southern League: 3rd
- FA Cup: Round 1
- Top goalscorer: League: Jack Farrell (10); All: Jack Farrell (14)
- Highest home attendance: 12,000 vs The Wednesday (1 February 1896) (FA Cup)
Home colours

The 1895–96 season was the eleventh since the foundation of Southampton St. Mary's F.C. and their second in league football, as members of the Southern League. They finished the league season in third place behind the previous season's champions, Millwall Athletic, and Luton Town. In the FA Cup they reached the first round proper for the second consecutive season, where they were defeated by The Wednesday, of the Football League.

== Pre-season ==
In the spring of 1895, Charles Robson had been appointed secretary to Southampton St Mary's Football Club, then playing in the Southern League. As secretary, he was responsible for signing new players and agreeing player contracts as well as being involved in team selection – the day to day coaching and training of the players was in the hands of the trainer.

One of Robson's first acts as secretary was to accompany Alfred McMinn, one of the club committee, on a trip to the Potteries to recruit players. McMinn was a native of Staffordshire and was "most persuasive on his home turf". On this trip, Robson and McMinn signed six players: Jack Farrell, Samuel Meston and Willie Naughton from Stoke, Watty Keay from Derby County, Joe Turner from Dresden United and Alf Wood from Burslem Port Vale, as well as recruiting Stoke's long-serving trainer, Bill Dawson. The Saints committee were anxious to secure their services and signed then before the Football League season was over. Port Vale and Stoke lodged a complaint with the Football Association about "poaching", and an emergency FA meeting was held at Sheffield, resulting in the Saints being severely censured for negligence. St Mary's were ordered to pay their own costs, plus £4 6s 3d to Stoke and £1 13s to Port Vale. McMinn was suspended for a year and Dawson for a month. Wood's registration with St Mary's was cancelled (shortly afterwards he moved to Stoke).

A proposal was put forward that the name of the club should be amended from Southampton St. Mary's to plain Southampton F.C. – this was rejected on the grounds that the club could no longer be called "The Saints" if the official name was changed. One change that was approved was that the team jerseys should be red and white halves rather than red and white quarters.

== League season ==
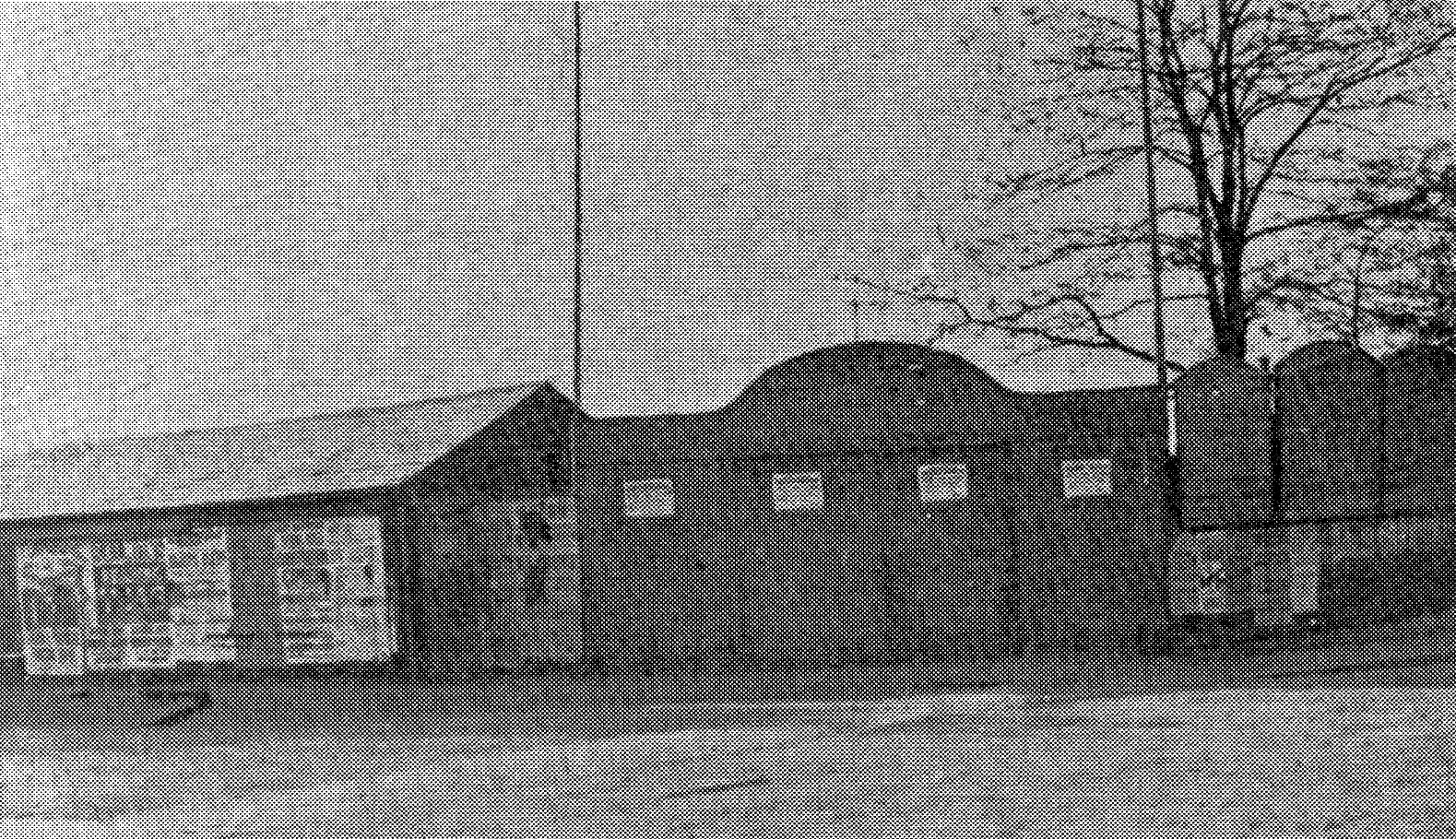
The entrance to the Antelope Ground

The 1895–96 season was the Saints' second in the Southern League, having finished third in the inaugural season. The team started the season badly, losing four of the first five matches, all of which were away from home. The poor start to the season was blamed on the inability of the new players to settle in the area. Eventually, under trainer Dawson's guidance, the team's form improved and there were only two further league defeats; after mid-December, the team suffered only one defeat and kept eight "clean sheets", despite first-choice goalkeeper Tom Cain missing several matches through injury. At the end of the season, they finished third behind Millwall Athletic and Luton Town, with the top three positions identical to the previous year.

Top scorer in the league was Jack Farrell with ten goals from his 17 appearances. The highlight of the league season was the visit of Millwall on 21 March 1896 when a crowd of 8,000 saw the Saints defeat the reigning champions 2–0, with goals from Charles Baker and Joe Turner.

In addition to the Southern League and FA Cup matches, the club played nearly 30 friendly matches, including a 9–0 victory over the Dublin Fusiliers and a 13–0 victory over the City Ramblers, in both of which Jack Farrell scored five goals. There were also victories over Dundee and Tottenham Hotspur.

At the end of the season, the Saints had to vacate the Antelope Ground, which had been sold for re-development, and moved to the County Ground, partly through the connections of the club's president, Robson's former Hampshire strike partner, Dr. H. W. R. Bencraft, who was also Hon. Secretary to the cricket club.

== League results ==
Date	Opponents	H / A	Result F – A	Scorers
14 September 1895	Millwall Athletic	A	0 – 1	
21 September 1895	Chatham	A	1 – 3	Naughton
28 September 1895	Reading	A	2 – 3	Naughton, Turner
5 October 1895	Royal Ordnance	A	2 – 1	Farrell (2)
19 October 1895	Clapton	A	3 – 7	Angus, Baker, Farrell
26 October 1895	Luton Town	H	2 – 1	Naughton, Turner
16 November 1895	Ilford	A	1 – 0	Rogers
30 November 1895	New Brompton	A	0 – 1	
7 December 1895	Swindon Town	H	4 – 2	Littlehales, Naughton, Taylor, Turner
21 December 1895	Reading	H	5 – 0	Keay (3), Farrell, Littlehales
18 January 1896	Chatham Town	H	4 – 0	Farrell (2), Naughton (2)
25 January 1896	Royal Ordnance	H	5 – 0	Baker, Keay, Littlehales, Naughton, Turner
15 February 1896	Swindon Town	A	2 – 0	Baker, Littlehales
7 March 1896	Luton Town	A	0 – 3	
21 March 1896	Millwall Athletic	H	2 – 0	Baker, Turner
28 March 1896	New Brompton	H	5 – 0	Hodgkinson (2), Baker, Farrell, Naughton
3 April 1896	Clapton	H	2 – 0	Farrell, Keay
4 April 1896	Ilford	H	4 – 0	Farrell (2), Keay, Turner

=== Legend ===
Win	Draw	Loss

=== Top of league table ===
Pos	Team	Pld	W	D	L	GF	GA	GR	Pts	Qualification or relegation
1	Millwall Athletic	18	16	1	1	75	16	4.688	33	
2	Luton Town	18	13	1	4	68	14	4.857	27	Left to join the United League at end of season
3	Southampton St. Mary's	18	12	0	6	44	23	1.913	24	
4	Reading	18	11	1	6	45	38	1.184	23	
5	Chatham Town	18	9	2	7	43	45	0.956	20	

Rules for classification: The system of using goal average to separate two teams tied on points was used until the 1976–77 season. The points system: 2 points for a win, 1 point for a draw and 0 points for losing.

== FA Cup ==
In the FA Cup, an away victory over local rivals Freemantle in the first qualifying round was followed by comfortable home victories over Marlow (5–0), Reading (3–0) and Uxbridge (3–0). In the First Round proper, the Saints received a home draw against opposition from the Football League First Division for the second consecutive year, this time against The Wednesday. Saints' trainer, Bill Dawson, spent the week leading up to Wednesday's visit with extra training for the players, taking them through their paces on Shawford Down.

For the match, played at the Antelope Ground on 1 February 1896, the crowd was estimated at 12,000, by far the largest yet recorded for a football match in Southampton. The Saints had to play their third-choice goalkeeper, Walter Cox as Tom Cain was injured, and the Royal Artillery refused to allow on-loan 'keeper "Gunner" Reilly to play. The Saints took an early lead, through Watty Keay, before two goals from Alec Brady gave Wednesday the half-time lead. Wednesday increased their lead shortly after the break, and although Joe Turner got one back, the Saints were unable to score an equalizer. Wednesday ran out 3–2 winners and went on to win the Cup the following April.

Date	Round	Opponents	H / A	Result F – A	Scorers	Attendance
12 October 1895	1st Qualifying Round	Freemantle	A	5 – 1	Farrell (2), Littlehales, Naughton, Turner	5,354
2 November 1895	2nd Qualifying Round	Marlow	H	5 – 0	Turner (2), Farrell (2), Meston	4,000
23 November 1895	3rd Qualifying Round	Reading	H	3 – 0	Taylor, Naughton, Keay	5,000
14 December 1895	4th Qualifying Round	Uxbridge	H	3 – 0	Naughton, Keay, Turner	4,000
1 February 1896	Round 1 Proper	The Wednesday	H	2 – 3	Keay, Turner	12,000

== Player statistics ==
Position	Nationality	Name	League apps	League goals	FA Cup apps	FA Cup goals	Total apps	Total goals
FW	Scotland	Jack Angus	3	1	1	0	4	1
FB	England	Charles Baker	18	5	5	0	23	12
GK	England	Jack Barrett	3	0	0	0	3	0
GK	England	Tom Cain	10	0	0	0	10	0
GK	England	Walter Cox	3	0	5	0	8	0
HB	England	Jimmy Dale	3	0	2	0	5	0
FW	England	Jack Farrell	17	10	5	4	22	14
FB	Wales	David Hamer	4	0	1	0	5	0
HB	England	John Hodgkinson	7	2	1	0	8	2
HB	Scotland	Sergt. Inglis ^{a}	1	0	0	0	1	0
FW	Scotland	Watty Keay	15	6	5	3	20	9
FW	England	Bob Kiddle	1	0	0	0	1	0
HB	England	Alf Littlehales	17	4	5	1	22	5
HB	Scotland	William McMillan	4	0	0	0	4	0
FB	England	George Marshall	8	0	3	0	11	0
FB	Scotland	Samuel Meston	18	0	5	1	23	1
FW	Scotland	Willie Naughton	17	8	4	3	21	11
FB	England	Gunner Phillips ^{b}	1	0	0	0	1	0
GK	Ireland	Matt Reilly	2	0	0	0	2	0
FB	England	Joe Rogers	8	1	1	0	9	1
HB	England	Victor Smith	1	0	0	0	1	0
HB	England	Ernie Taylor	8	1	2	1	10	2
HB	England	Lachie Thomson	12	0	5	0	17	0
FW	England	Joe Turner	17	6	5	5	22	11

=== Key ===
- GK — Goalkeeper
- FB — Full back
- HB — Half back
- FW — Forward

=== Notes ===
- ^a Sergt. Inglis was loaned to the Saints by the Argyll & Sutherland Highlanders for the final match of the season
- ^b Gunner Phillips was a member of the Royal Artillery team and played the penultimate match of the season on loan to the "Saints"

== Transfers ==
=== In ===
Date	Position	Name	From
October 1895	GK	Tom Cain	Everton
October 1895	HB	Jimmy Dale	Stoke
April 1895	FW	Jack Farrell	Stoke
December 1895	HB	John Hodgkinson	Tunstall
April 1895	FW	Watty Keay	Derby County
March 1896	HB	William McMillan	Heart of Midlothian
April 1895	FB	Samuel Meston	Stoke
April 1895	FW	Willie Naughton	Stoke
April 1895	FW	Joe Turner	Dresden United

=== Departures ===
Date	Position	Name	To
November 1895	FW	Jack Angus	Retired
October 1895	GK	Jack Barrett	Retired
Summer 1895	FW	Jack Dorkin	Retired
Summer 1895	HB	Bill Furby	Freemantle
July 1895	FW	Fred Hollands	Millwall Athletic
Summer 1895	FB	William Jeffrey	Retired
December 1895	FW	Bob Kiddle	Retired
Summer 1895	FW	Arthur Nineham	Freemantle
Summer 1895	FW	Harry Offer	Retired
Summer 1895	FW	Herbert Ward	Retired
Summer 1895	GK	Herbert Williamson	Royal Ordnance Factories

== Bibliography ==
- Bull, David; Brunskell, Bob (2000). Match of the Millennium. Hagiology Publishing. ISBN 0-9534474-1-3.
- Chalk, Gary; Holley, Duncan (1987). Saints – A complete record. Breedon Books. ISBN 0-907969-22-4.
- Collett, Mike (2003). The Complete Record of the FA Cup. Sports Books. ISBN 1-899807-19-5.
- Juson, Dave; Bull, David (2001). Full-Time at The Dell. Hagiology Publishing. ISBN 0-9534474-2-1.
