= 1897–98 Southampton F.C. season =

Southampton F.C.
1897–98 season
- Chairman: Dr. Ernest Stancomb
- Secretary: Er Arnfield
- Stadium: The County Ground
- Southern League: Champions
- FA Cup: Semi-final
- Top goalscorer: League: Robert Buchanan & Joe Turner (10); All: Robert Buchanan (16)
- Highest home attendance: 15,000 vs Bolton Wanderers (2 March 1898) (FA Cup)
Home colours

The 1897–98 season was the 13th since the foundation of Southampton F.C. and their fourth in league football, as members of the Southern League.

The club improved on their performance in the previous successful season, retaining the Southern League title and reaching the Semi-final of the FA Cup for the first time, where they went out in controversial circumstances. They started the season as tenants of Hampshire County Cricket Club, but by the end of the season, the club had found a new permanent home, where they were to remain for over 100 years.

By the end of a "phenomenally successful", Southampton were lifted out of relative obscurity into national prominence. In their report to the shareholders for the Annual General Meeting held on 30 June 1898, the directors commented: "The team's performance in the English Cup and their retention of the Southern League Championship entitled the club to rank among the best in the country".

== Pre-season ==
Following the incorporation of the limited company in July 1897, the club had dropped "St. Mary's" from their name and henceforth would be known simply as "Southampton Football Club". One local reporter lamented:

No longer will football enthusiasts be able to call out "Buck up Saints!" No longer will reporters with a flowery style be able to write of the "Saintly ones". For the Football Association has acceded to the request of the powers, and the club will in future be known as Southampton Football Club.

The Saints are dead. Long live Southampton!

Despite this, the press and club supporters continued to refer to the club as "the Saints", as they have done ever since.

Once again, the board recruited several players from Football League clubs, most prominent of whom was Arthur Chadwick who was to remain with the club as a player for three years, returning in 1925 as manager.

== League season ==
The 1897–98 season was the Saints' fourth in the Southern League, having finished as champions in the previous season.

The season started badly, with a defeat at Tottenham Hotspur, but Southampton won the next three matches, all away from home. The first home match of the season came on 23 October, when Southampton gained their revenge against the Spurs, with a 4–1 victory. The next five matches were also victories before a poor defeat at Bristol City on 22 January. After a draw at Chatham, a run of eight victories gave the Saints the title, despite a home defeat to Chatham Town on the last day of the season; this was Southampton's first home league defeat for three years.

In the draw at Chatham on 5 February, a small piece of history was made as the former Ireland and England international, Jack Reynolds made his first appearance for Southampton, thus becoming the first international player to appear for the side. He only made one further appearance before dropping down to lower league football.

Despite the success on the pitch, there was considerable disharmony in the dressing room, especially regarding the behaviour of Jack Farrell; he had been ordered out of a board meeting and suspended for two matches early in the season having used "abusive language" during a discussion of his grievances. Other players in trouble included new signings Tom Nicol, who was obliged to apologise to the board for his behaviour, and Bob Petrie, who was reprimanded over his drinking. In November, Watty Keay asked to be relieved of the captaincy, which was being rotated among the players on a monthly basis; he advised the board that he "was not comfortable in that position, there being so much dissension amongst the players."

== League results ==
Date	Opponents	H / A	Result F – A	Scorers
18 September 1897	Tottenham Hotspur	A	0 – 2	
2 October 1897	Sheppey United	A	1 – 0	Keay
9 October 1897	Millwall Athletic	A	3 – 2	Buchanan (2), Yates
16 October 1897	Reading	A	2 – 0	Naughton, Turner
23 October 1897	Tottenham Hotspur	H	4 – 1	Yates (2), Farrell, Turner
6 November 1897	Swindon Town	H	4 – 1	Buchanan (3), Keay
13 November 1897	New Brompton	A	1 – 0	Farrell
27 November 1897	Wolverton L & NWR	A	2 – 0	Petrie, Yates
1 January 1898	Bristol City	H	4 – 0	Keay (2), Chadwick, Petrie
8 January 1898	Sheppey United	A	4 – 0	Buchanan (2), Farrell, Meston
15 January 1898	Bristol City	A	2 – 5	Farrell, Yates
22 January 1898	New Brompton	H	4 – 1	Turner (3), Buchanan
5 February 1898	Chatham Town	A	1 – 1	Buchanan
19 February 1898	Reading	H	2 – 1	Chadwick, Keay
5 March 1898	Swindon Town	A	2 – 0	Petrie, Yates
12 March 1898	Wolverton L & NWR	H	3 – 0	Turner (3), Farrell
26 March 1898	Gravesend United	A	3 – 1	Petrie, Steven, Turner
4 April 1898	Gravesend United	H	5 – 1	Steven (2), Brown, Buchanan, Turner
11 April 1898	Northfleet	H	3 – 1	McMillan, Brown
16 April 1898	Northfleet	A	2 – 0	Meston, Steven
20 April 1898	Millwall Athletic	H	1 – 0	Turner
1 May 1898	Chatham Town	H	0 – 1	

=== Legend ===
Win	Draw	Loss

=== Top of league table ===
Pos	Team	Pld	W	D	L	GF	GA	GR	Pts
1	Southampton	22	18	1	3	53	18	2.944	37
2	Bristol City	22	13	7	2	67	33	2.030	33
3	Tottenham Hotspur	22	12	4	6	52	31	1.677	28
4	Chatham Town	22	12	4	6	50	34	1.471	28
5	Reading	22	8	7	7	39	31	1.258	23

Rules for classification: The system of using goal average to separate two teams tied on points was used until the 1976-77 season. The points system: 2 points for a win, 1 point for a draw and 0 points for losing.

== FA Cup ==
Southampton entered the 1897–98 FA Cup tournament at the Third Qualifying Round, where they met their Southern League rivals, Bristol City. Robert Buchanan scored after only ten seconds from when the Saints were in complete control with Yates adding a second goal to complete a 2–0 victory. The next match, at Swindon, was won by half-time while Eastville Rovers were comprehensively defeated 8–1 in the final qualifying round, with Yates, Buchanan, Keay and Turner each scoring twice.

In the First Round proper, Southampton entertained Leicester Fosse, then lying seventh in the Football League Second Division. In preparation for the match, the entire team were sent to Shawford for a week for additional training under the supervision of Bill Dawson. Saints achieved a "fine win" with Meston and Buchanan scoring in a 2–1 victory; this was the first time that a Southern League club had ever defeated opposition from the Football League.

The reward was another home tie against another team from the Second Division, Newcastle United. As a result of a dispute with the landlady of the Shawford lodgings, the directors decided to take the players out each evening to sample the entertainments on offer in Southampton, which included an evening at the Philharmonic Hall and visits to the Empire Music Hall and the Prince of Wales theatre. These evenings helped maintain the team's morale resulting in a 1–0 victory over their league opponents.

By this time, the local press were speculating that Southampton could reach at least the semi-final stage of the competition, with one commentator expressing the opinion: "if the present rate of progress is maintained we shall yet see our champions in the final at the Palace." The draw for Round Three was against Bolton Wanderers of the Football League First Division, away. The national press predicted an easy home victory, with Bolton expected to put paid to "the parrot cries concerning the great improvement in the game south of the Thames." In preparation for the match, the board sent the players together with Dawson to Matlock Bath to stay at the Chesterfield House Hydro for a week of special training. Each player was on an £8 bonus for a win and £5 for a draw.

At Burnden Park, they were greeted by at least 300 Southampton supporters who had arrived in a special train run by the Didcot, Newbury and Southampton Railway Company. The journey took eight hours each way, with the round trip lasting 28 hours, at a cost of 10s. The supporters were rewarded with a goalless draw, described by The Daily Telegraph as "the biggest surprise of the day".

The replay took place at the County Ground on the following Wednesday afternoon in front of a crowd estimated at between 12,000 and 15,000, netting gate receipts of £532. To the surprise of the national press, Southampton put on "an outstanding display" to win 4–0. At one stage in the match, the hugely partisan crowd spilled onto the pitch, with the match having to be halted temporarily. The Daily Mail was duly impressed:

Southampton's success against Bolton Wanderers marks the dawning of a new era for professional football in the South, and it is now becoming more and more evident that absolutely first-class football is not to be for ever monopolised by the Northern organisations. While lamenting methods by which this condition of things has been brought about – that is to say, the hiring of aliens – one cannot escape a feeling of gratification that the South is at last holding its own once more.

This victory set up a semi-final tie with another First Division club, Nottingham Forest, which would turn out to be one of the most controversial in the history of the FA Cup to date.

=== The semi-final ===
When the draw for the semi-finals was made, The Football Association decided that the Derby County vs. Everton tie should be at Wolverhampton while Southampton and Forest would go to Sheffield United's Bramall Lane. This prompted the Southampton board to formally request that the FA switch the venues, to reduce the travelling for supporters of all four clubs. The FA's response was minuted in the Southampton board meeting held on 11 March: "Letter from F.J. Wall (secretary of the FA) saying Association could not see their way to change the grounds in the English Cup semi-finals".

Once again, the players were sent to Matlock Bath for a week of special training. In the match at Bramall Lane, Forest took the lead after only five minutes with a goal from Len Benbow. Following a collision with the Forest goalkeeper, Southampton's centre-forward Jack Farrell was reduced to a passenger for the remainder of the match; despite this, Southampton equalised through Harry Haynes to earn a replay at Crystal Palace.

The replay on 23 March was played in a blizzard. After a scoreless first half (in which Joe Turner missed a penalty for Southampton), in the second half Saints were on top when, with ten minutes left to play, referee John Lewis stopped the match for a time and the players left the pitch. When the match restarted, according to one report: "hardly had the players taken up their positions again when the snow recommenced with redoubled fury, and the Forest, assisted by the blizzard, put on a couple of goals in the last minutes". Another account claimed that the Saints' goalkeeper, George Clawley had his eyes "choked with snow" when he conceded the two goals. All reports of the match confirm that the storm was worse when the two goals were scored than when the players were taken from the pitch. Forest's goals came from Tom McInnes and Charlie Richards, as Forest went on to defeat Derby County in the final.

The Southampton board immediately lodged a protest with the Football Association, and there were numerous letters of complaint to both the national and local press. Despite the protests, the F.A. decided that the result should stand – this was perhaps not surprising as Lewis was an eminent member of the F.A. board. Some spectators objected to Southampton's protests, including one who wrote to the Morning Leader :

The demoralising effect of an imported team of mercenaries was evident in the behaviour of the southern partisans at the Crystal Place on Thursday. Anything more unsportsmanlike it would be difficult to conceive.

=== FA Cup results ===
Date	Round	Opponents	H / A	Result F – A	Scorers	Attendance
30 October 1897	3rd Qualifying Round	Bristol City	H	2 – 0	Buchanan, Yates	11,000
20 November 1897	4th Qualifying Round	Swindon Town	A	3 – 0	Farrell (2), Buchanan	5,000
11 December 1897	5th Qualifying Round	Eastville Rovers	H	8 – 1	Yates (2), Buchanan (2), Keay (2), Turner (2)	8,000
29 January 1898	Round 1 Proper	Leicester Fosse	H	2 – 1	Meston, Buchanan	10,000
12 February 1898	Round 2 Proper	Newcastle United	H	1 – 0	Buchanan	12,000
26 February 1898	Round 3 Proper	Bolton Wanderers	A	0 – 0		15,000
2 March 1898	Round 3 Proper Replay	Bolton Wanderers	H	4 – 0	Turner (2), Yates, Farrell	15,000
19 March 1898	Semi-final	Nottingham Forest	Bramall Lane	1 – 1	Haynes	20,000
23 March 1898	Semi-final Replay	Nottingham Forest	Crystal Palace	0 – 2		16,800

== New stadium ==
Since 1896, Southampton had been tenants of Hampshire County Cricket Club at the County Ground, having vacated the Antelope Ground in the summer of 1896. The rent payable to the cricket club (£200 p.a.) was putting a strain on the football club's finances and, in an attempt to reduce this burden, the club had considered a merger with the Freemantle club and a move to their ground in Shirley. The merger proposals had fallen down, but at the Extraordinary general meeting in June 1897, the members were informed that "the committee had a ground in view".

At a shareholders' meeting on 11 November 1897, the chairman stated:

. . . that all being well, by next season the company would be in possession of its own ground which was at the present time in the hands of George Thomas Esq. who was devoting his time to its early completion.

Although the minutes do not record the location of the new ground, it was common knowledge within the town that the new ground was situated

. . . in the dell that is not far from the County Ground, and nearer West Station and the town, and at the present time it is a narrow valley with a stone culvert running along the bottom. It will not be a large ground, but the natural banks on all sides will be a great help in arranging for the convenience of the spectators.

The site on which the ground was built was described in Philip Brannon's Picture of Southampton, published in 1850, as "a lovely dell with a gurgling stream and lofty aspens"; the stream is the Rollsbrook which flows out of Southampton Common, running parallel to Hill Lane before now disappearing under Commercial Road and the Central Station, from where it is conduited under Southampton Docks into Southampton Water. The land had been purchased in the 1880s by the Didcot, Newbury and Southampton Railway to enable them to continue the line from Shawford via Otterbourne and Bassett into Shirley (it is often incorrectly supposed that a station was to be situated in what is now St. James' Park, opposite St. James' Church). From here the line would have travelled south across Hill Lane to run through the dell and then on an embankment and viaduct over Commercial Road and the London and South Western line before terminating on the Western Esplanade at the foot of Arundel Tower. The dell was stripped of vegetation and the stream channelled into a conduit with work started on the embankment and viaduct, before the project was abandoned and the D.N.S.R. obtained running rights over the L.S.W.R. from Winchester into Southampton.

=== Construction ===
George Thomas, a fish merchant who had been appointed as a director of the limited company when it was formed in the summer of 1896, who lived in Shirley, saw the potential of the cleared site and purchased the land from the D.N.S.R. By the beginning of the 1898–99 season, Thomas had incurred expenditure of between £7,500 and £9,000 on acquiring and clearing the site, and erecting the new stands and had agreed an initial three-year lease to the football club at a rental of £250 p.a. The dell had been drained with 13,000 ft of pipe being laid, all draining into the central culvert formed from the Rollsbrook stream. The playing field had to be levelled and the ground made up and turfed ready for the opening of the new season. On completion, the stadium was described in the Southampton Observer:

. . . the rising staging on the north side of the ground will hold 5,500 spectators, who have of course to stand up; the covered east and west stands will seat 4,000 spectators comfortably, and the staging and sloping bank on the south side will hold 15,000 spectators. This totals up to 24,500.

At this stage, the new ground did not have an official name, with various names suggested including "the Fitzhugh Dell", "The Archer's Ground" and "Milton Park" but gradually the ground became known by default as "The Dell".

== Player statistics ==
Position	Nationality	Name	League apps	League goals	FA Cup apps	FA Cup goals	Total apps	Total goals
FW	England	Bob Brown	12	2	0	0	12	2
FW	Scotland	Robert Buchanan	19	10	9	6	28	16
HB	England	Arthur Chadwick	21	2	9	0	30	2
GK	England	George Clawley	22	0	9	0	31	0
FW	England	Jack Farrell	15	5	8	3	23	8
FB	England	Harry Haynes	22	0	9	1	31	1
FW	Scotland	Watty Keay	18	5	8	2	26	7
HB	England	Alf Littlehales	1	0	0	0	1	0
HB	Scotland	William McMillan	7	2	0	0	7	2
HB	Scotland	Samuel Meston	22	2	9	1	31	3
FW	Scotland	Willie Naughton	3	1	1	0	4	1
FB	Scotland	Tom Nicol	17	0	9	0	26	0
HB	Scotland	Bob Petrie	20	4	9	0	29	4
FW	England	Jack Reynolds	2	0	0	0	2	0
HB	England	Victor Smith	0	0	0	0	0	0
FW	Scotland	David Steven	8	4	3	0	11	4
FW	England	Joe Turner	20	10	9	4	29	14
FW	England	Jimmy Yates	13	6	7	4	20	10

=== Key ===
- GK — Goalkeeper
- FB — Full back
- HB — Half back
- FW — Forward

== Transfers ==
=== In ===
Date	Position	Name	From
May 1897	FW	Bob Brown	Burton Wanderers
May 1897	HB	Arthur Chadwick	Burton Swifts
Summer 1897	FB	Tom Nicol	Blackburn Rovers
May 1897	HB	Bob Petrie	Sheffield Wednesday
February 1898	FW	Jack Reynolds	Celtic
Summer 1897	FW	David Steven	Dundee
Summer 1897	FW	Jimmy Yates	Sheffield United

=== Departures ===
Date	Position	Name	To
Summer 1897	GK	Walter Cox	Bristol St George
Summer 1897	FB	David Hamer	Cowes
Summer 1897	HB	John Hodgkinson	New Brompton
March 1898	HB	Alf Littlehales	Retired
Summer 1897	FB	Donald McKay	Retired
Summer 1897	FB	James McKie	Chatham
Summer 1897	HB	William Ponting	Andover
Summer 1897	FW	George Seeley	Bristol St George

== Bibliography ==
- Brannon, Philip (1979) [First published 1850]. Picture of Southampton. Alresford: Lawrence Oxley. ISBN 0-9501347-3-2.
- Bull, David; Brunskell, Bob (2000). Match of the Millennium. Hagiology Publishing. ISBN 0-9534474-1-3.
- Chalk, Gary; Holley, Duncan (1987). Saints – A complete record. Breedon Books. ISBN 0-907969-22-4.
- Collett, Mike (2003). The Complete Record of the FA Cup. Sports Books. ISBN 1-899807-19-5.
- Holley, Duncan; Chalk, Gary (1992). The Alphabet of the Saints. ACL & Polar Publishing. ISBN 0-9514862-3-3.
- Juson, Dave; Bull, David (2001). Full-Time at The Dell. Hagiology Publishing. ISBN 0-9534474-2-1.
