= 1894–95 Southampton St. Mary's F.C. season =

English football club season

Southampton St. Mary's F.C.
1894–95 season
- President: Dr Henry William Russell Bencraft
- Secretary: Cecil Knight
- Stadium: Antelope Ground
- Southern League: 3rd
- FA Cup: Round 1
- Top goalscorer: League: Jack Angus, Charles Baker, Herbert Ward (6); All: Charles Baker (12)
- Highest home attendance: 7,000 vs Nottingham Forest (2 February 1895) (FA Cup)
Home colours

The 1894–95 season was the tenth since the foundation of Southampton St. Mary's F.C. and their first in league football, being founder members of the Southern League.

They finished the league season in third place behind the champions, Millwall Athletic, and Luton Town. In the FA Cup they reached the first round proper for the first time, where they were defeated by Nottingham Forest, of the Football League.

== Summary of the season ==
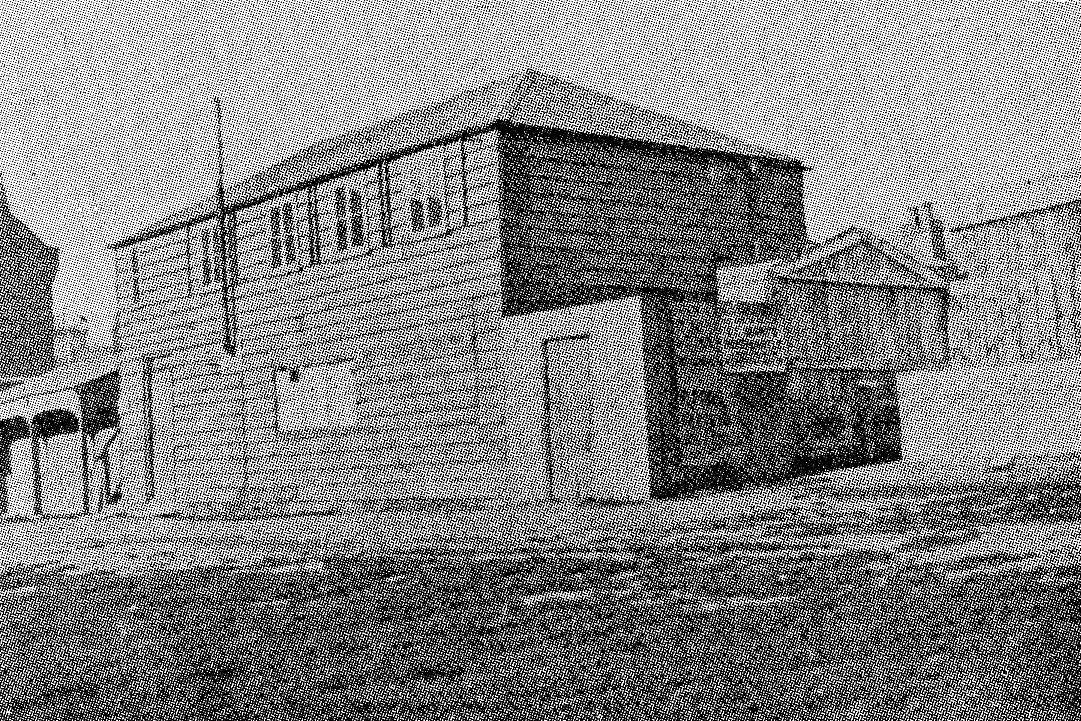
The players' dressing room at the Antelope Ground

In 1894, Southampton St Mary's were one of the nine founder members of the Southern League, which had been created to enable clubs in southern England who were not admitted to the Football League, to play competitive football on a regular basis. St. Mary's were not originally invited to join the new league and their initial application to join had been rejected, even though seven of the original nine clubs were wholly or mainly amateur, whereas Southampton had employed their first professional footballer in 1892 and by now the team was composed mainly of professionals. Because of the interest in the new league, a Second Division was to be created, which Southampton were considering applying to join when the 2nd Scots Guards withdrew and St. Mary's were invited to take their place.

In his preview of the forthcoming season in the Southampton Times, "Ariel" predicted:

It is very wonderful to notice the pertinacity with which the prophets continue to prophecy. Southampton St. Mary's have not yet played in the competition, but their position at the end of the season has already been positively fixed by some people, and I have not heard anybody place them lower than third on the list, Millwall Athletic and Luton only taking precedence.

For the start of their League career, Saints signed several new players on professional contracts, including Charles Baker and Alf Littlehales from Stoke and Fred Hollands from Millwall.

Saints' first league match was played at the Antelope Ground on 6 October 1894 in front of a crowd estimated at between 4,000 and 5,000, who paid 6d each for admittance; Harry Offer, Jack Angus and Fred Hollands scored in a 3–1 victory over Chatham. During the match, Chatham's centre-forward, Gamble, was sent-off for making "uncomplimentary" comments to the referee following Southampton's second goal, for which he claimed the ball had been "carried right into goal on one of the player's arms".

The Saints' first home defeat came against Luton on 22 December (2–1), having previously lost at Luton by a 4–1 scoreline; the worst defeat (4–0) came at Millwall on 23 March with their best result coming a week later, a 7–1 victory over Swindon Town on 30 March, with two goals each from Jack Angus and Herbert Ward. Saints finished their inaugural league season in third place, behind Millwall and Luton Town.

Saints supplemented their fixture list with several friendly matches, including matches in November against Football League clubs, Stoke and Bolton Wanderers, the latter being won 5–2. On 19 January, the Saints entertained a team from the Wiltshire Regiment, winning 13–0 on a "quagmire of a pitch" at the Antelope Ground, with Joe Rogers scoring ten goals. in April, after the league season had ended, the Saints entertained teams from Tottenham Hotspur (drawn 0–0) and the famous Corinthian club, which was won 2–0.

The Saints continued to take part in the local cup tournaments, winning the Hampshire Senior Cup for the third time with a 5–1 victory in the final over the Royal Artillery.

== League results ==
Date	Opponents	H / A	Result F – A	Scorers
6 October 1894	Chatham Town	H	3 – 1	Angus, Hollands, Offer
20 October 1894	Royal Ordnance	H	3 – 1	H. Ward (2), Offer
27 October 1894	Luton Town	A	1 – 4	Angus
17 November 1894	Millwall Athletic	H	2 – 2	Baker, Thomson
8 December 1894	Reading	A	1 – 0	H. Ward
22 December 1894	Luton Town	H	1 – 2	Baker
29 December 1894	Ilford	A	2 – 1	Hollands, Nineham
5 January 1895	Reading	H	1 – 3	Offer
12 January 1895	Clapton	A	3 – 1	Baker, Offer, Rogers
23 February 1895	Swindon Town	A	3 – 2	Baker, Nineham, H. Ward
9 March 1895	Chatham Town	A	1 – 1	Baker
14 March 1895	Royal Ordnance	A	0 – 2	
23 March 1895	Millwall Athletic	A	0 – 4	
30 March 1895	Swindon Town	H	7 – 1	Angus (2), H. Ward (2), Baker, Dorkin, Hollands
12 April 1895	Clapton	H	3 – 0	Nineham (2), Dorkin
13 April 1895	Ilford	H	3 – 0	Angus (2), Dorkin

=== Legend ===
Win	Draw	Loss

=== Top of league table ===
Pos	Team	Pld	W	D	L	GF	GA	GR	Pts
1	Millwall Athletic	16	12	4	0	68	19	3.579	28
2	Luton Town	16	9	4	3	36	22	1.636	22
3	Southampton St. Mary's	16	9	2	5	34	25	1.360	20
4	Ilford	16	6	3	7	26	40	0.650	15
5	Reading	16	6	2	8	33	38	0.868	14

Source: The system of using goal average to separate two teams tied on points was used up until the 1976-77 season. The points system: 2 points for a win, 1 point for a draw and 0 points for losing.

== FA Cup ==
In the FA Cup, Southampton met Newbury on 13 October 1894 in the first qualifying round at the Antelope Ground. Saints were "in particularly rampant mood" and won 14–0, with hat-tricks from Herbert Ward and Arthur Nineham; this is still Southampton's biggest victory in a competitive match. They had easy victories in the next three rounds, defeating Reading 5–2, Marlow 7–3 and Warmley 5–1, with all four qualifying matches being played at the Antelope Ground. This meant that the Saints went into the draw for the First round proper for the first time, from which they received yet another home tie, against Nottingham Forest of the First Division.

The match against Nottingham Forest was played at the Antelope Ground on 2 February 1895. On the day of the match, the pitch was covered with three inches (76 mm) of snow. After a long delay, while the referee assessed whether or not the frozen ground was fit to play on, the crowd (estimated at 7,000) were admitted. Despite scoring 31 goals in the qualifying stages, the Saints were no match for the "skill, subtlety and cohesion" of their opponents who ran out 4–1 victors, with two goals from Thomas Rose The local press blamed the defeat on the failure of the Southampton players to train adequately and also suggested that the "more northerly visitors were more accustomed to the Arctic conditions".

Date	Round	Opponents	H / A	Result F – A	Scorers	Attendance
13 October 1894	1st qualifying round	Newbury	H	14 – 0	H. Ward (3), Nineham (3), Angus (2), Hollands (2), Offer (2), Taylor, Thomson	4,000
3 November 1894	2nd qualifying round	Reading	H	5 – 2	Baker (3), Angus, H. Ward	5,000
24 November 1894	3rd qualifying round	Marlow	H	7 – 3	Offer (3), Charles Baker (2), Dorkin, Angus	5,000
15 December 1894	4th qualifying round	Warmley	H	5 – 1	Nineham (2), Offer, Baker, Littlehales	3,000
2 February 1895	Round 1 Proper	Nottingham Forest	H	1 – 4	H. Ward	7,000

== Player statistics ==
The players who appeared in the Southern League or FA Cup matches were as follows. This list does not include players who only played in friendly or reserve team matches.

Position	Nationality	Name	League apps	League goals	FA Cup apps	FA Cup goals	Total apps	Total goals
FW	Scotland	Jack Angus	13	6	4	4	17	10
FB	England	Charles Baker	15	6	4	6	19	12
GK	England	Jack Barrett	4	0	1	0	5	0
GK	England	Walter Cox	0	0	2	0	2	0
FW	England	Jack Dorkin	3	3	1	1	4	4
HB	England	Bill Furby	5	0	2	0	7	0
FB	Wales	David Hamer	3	0	3	0	6	0
FW	England	Fred Hollands	15	3	5	2	20	5
FB	England	William Jeffrey	13	0	2	0	15	0
HB	England	Alf Littlehales	16	0	5	1	21	1
FB	England	George Marshall	14	0	5	0	19	0
FW	England	Arthur Nineham	7	4	2	5	9	9
FW	England	Harry Offer	13	4	5	6	18	10
FW	England	Joe Rogers	7	1	0	0	7	1
HB	England	Ernie Taylor	11	0	3	1	14	1
HB	England	Lachie Thomson	15	1	5	1	20	2
FW	England	A. Ward ^{a}	1	0	0	0	1	0
FW	England	Herbert Ward	9	6	4	5	13	11
GK	England	Herbert Williamson	12	0	2	0	14	0

=== Key ===
- GK — Goalkeeper
- FB — Full back
- HB — Half back
- FW — Forward

=== Notes ===
- ^a A. Ward played at Millwall on 23 March 1895, on trial from the Lancaster Regiment, for whom he impressed when he played against St. Mary's in a friendly in February. He was unable to reproduce his form in the league match and played no other senior football for the club.

== Transfers ==
=== In ===
Date	Position	Name	From
Summer 1894	FW	Charles Baker	Stoke
Summer 1894	FB	David Hamer	Cowes
Summer 1894	FW	Fred Hollands	Millwall Athletic
November 1894	FB	William Jeffrey	Woolwich Arsenal
Summer 1894	HB	Alf Littlehales	Stoke
December 1894	FW	Joe Rogers	Macclesfield
November 1894	GK	Herbert Williamson	Local football

=== Departures ===
Date	Position	Name	To
Summer 1894	FB	George Carter	Retired
Autumn 1894	FW	Charles Miller	Returned to Brazil
Summer 1894	FW	Ernie Nicholls	Retired
Summer 1894	HB	William Stride	Retired

== Bibliography ==
- Bull, David; Brunskell, Bob (2000). Match of the Millennium. Hagiology Publishing. ISBN 978-0-9534474-1-1.
- Chalk, Gary; Holley, Duncan (1987). Saints – A complete record. Breedon Books. ISBN 978-0-907969-22-8.
- Collett, Mike (2003). The Complete Record of the FA Cup. Sports Books. ISBN 978-1-899807-19-2.
- Holley, Duncan; Chalk, Gary (1992). The Alphabet of the Saints. ACL & Polar Publishing. ISBN 978-0-9514862-3-8.
- Juson, Dave; Bull, David (2001). Full-Time at The Dell. Hagiology Publishing. ISBN 978-0-9534474-2-8.
