= Jack Barrett (footballer, born 1874) =

English footballer

Personal information
- Full name: Uriah John Barrett
- Date of birth: April qtr 1874
- Place of birth: Wootton Bassett, England
- Date of death: January qtr 1934 (Aged 59)
- Place of death: Redhill, Surrey, England
- Position: Goalkeeper

Youth career
- Alma (Southampton)

Senior career*
Years	Team	Apps	(Gls)
1894–1895	Southampton St. Mary's	7	(0)
- * Club domestic league appearances and goals

Uriah John Barrett (April quarter 1874 – January quarter 1934) was an amateur footballer who played as a goalkeeper for Southampton St. Mary's in the mid-1890s.

== Football career ==
Barrett was born in Wootton Bassett, Wiltshire, and moved to Southampton, where he trained as a shoemaker. He had played local parks football before joining Southampton St. Mary's in March 1894, taking over from Ralph Ruffell who had been the "Saints" first-choice goalkeeper since the club was founded in 1885. Ruffell sustained a dislocated kneecap in the Hampshire Senior Cup final in March 1894, and the club called on Barrett's services for the remaining matches of the season, including the Hampshire County Cricket Club Charity Cup Final against Royal Artillery (won 5–0) and the Portsmouth & District Cup Final against Freemantle (lost 2–0).

In October 1894, St. Mary's made their debut in the inaugural Southern League season, with Barrett in goal in the 3–1 victory over Chatham. Barrett had a poor league debut, missing a cross early in the match, which was cleared by David "Taffy" Hamer. Soon afterwards, Barret was again at fault, allowing Gamble to score the opening goal with "a soft shot". Barrett soon rallied, however, and made amends with a "brilliant save" from McAucklan before Harry Offer's equalizing goal. Barrett retained his place in goal for the next three games including the 14–0 FA Cup victory over Newbury in the first qualifying round on 13 October 1894 – this is still Southampton's biggest victory in a competitive match. Following a 4–1 defeat at Luton Town, he was dropped in favour of Walter Cox for two FA Cup matches before Herbert Williamson took over for the remainder of the season.

Barrett made one further appearance in January and, following the departure of Williamson in the summer of 1895, played the first three matches of the 1895–96 season before again losing his place, this time to Tom Cain. With Cox being retained as the second-choice 'keeper, Barrett left the club in October 1895.

== Later career ==
On quitting football, Barrett decided to concentrate on a career as a professional cricketer, but failed to make it to County level. He died in 1934, shortly before his 60th birthday – his death at a relatively young age was attributed to blood poisoning, apparently stemming from being struck on the leg by a cricket ball.
