= Joe Turner (footballer, born 1872) =

English footballer (1872-1950)

Personal information
- Full name: Joseph Turner
- Date of birth: March 1872
- Place of birth: Burslem, England
- Date of death: 20 November 1950 (aged 78)
- Place of death: Southampton, England
- Position: Outside forward

Senior career*
Years	Team	Apps	(Gls)
1893–1894	Newcastle Swifts		
1894–1895	Dresden United		
1895–1898	Southampton St. Mary's	56	(28)
1898–1900	Stoke	57	(15)
1900–1901	Everton	32	(8)
1901–1904	Southampton	68	(28)
1904–1906	New Brompton		
1906–1908	Northampton Town		
- Eastleigh Athletic
- South Farnborough Athletic
- * Club domestic league appearances and goals

Joseph Turner (March 1872 – 20 November 1950) was a professional footballer who played in the 1902 FA Cup final for Southampton. Southampton were a Southern League club at the time, and their feat was all the more remarkable in that they had already been losing finalists two years earlier. Turner missed the 1900 final and had also previously missed a crucial penalty when Southampton lost a semi final to Nottingham Forest in 1898.

== Football career ==
=== Early career ===
Turner was born in Burslem, Staffordshire and started his football career with Newcastle Swifts in 1893, before joining Dresden United the following year.

In the spring of 1895, Charles Robson, the newly appointed secretary/manager of Southampton St. Mary's, and Alfred McMinn, one of the club committee, visited "the Potteries" in search of new players to strengthen the team ready for their second season in the Southern League. McMinn was a native of Staffordshire and was "most persuasive on his home turf". On this trip, Robson and McMinn signed six players: Turner, Jack Farrell, Samuel Meston and Willie Naughton from Stoke, Watty Keay from Derby County and Alf Wood from Burslem Port Vale, as well as recruiting Stoke's long-serving trainer, Bill Dawson. The Saints committee were anxious to secure their services and signed then before the Football League season was over. Port Vale and Stoke lodged a complaint with the Football Association (FA) about "poaching", and an emergency FA meeting was held at Sheffield, resulting in the Saints being severely censured for negligence. St Mary's were ordered to pay their own costs, plus £4 6s 3d to Stoke and £1 13s to Port Vale. McMinn was suspended for a year and Dawson for a month. Wood's registration with St Mary's was cancelled (shortly afterwards he moved to Stoke).

=== Southampton ===
Turner joined "the Saints" on a wage of thirty shillings per week and made his debut for Southampton in the opening match of the season, a 1–0 defeat at champions Millwall Athletic. Saints started the season with five away matches, four of which were defeats. Eventually, Turner and Watty Keay formed a good partnership on the left, with Turner's "electrifying speed" on the wing providing the crosses for Jack Farrell, and under trainer Dawson's guidance, the team's form improved and there were only two further league defeats as the team ended the season in third place, with Turner having contributed six goals. Turner also played in all five FA Cup matches, contributing five goals, as the Saints reached the First Round proper, going out to eventual winners, Sheffield Wednesday.

In the following season, the Saints forward line was boosted by the signing of Bob Buchanan from Woolwich Arsenal, with the defence being strengthened by the signing of George Clawley from Tottenham Hotspur. Southampton exceeded the achievements of the two previous seasons, winning the Southern League title without losing a match, with Turner scoring 12 goals from 19 league appearances. In the FA Cup, Turner was ever-present, scoring six goals from seven matches, helping the Saints reach the Second Round Proper, where they went out to Newton Heath after a replay.

Turner remained at Southampton for one further season, helping them retain their Southern League title and reach the Semi-final of the FA Cup where they took Nottingham Forest to a replay. The replay at Crystal Palace was played in a blizzard. After a scoreless first half (in which Turner missed a penalty for Southampton), in the second half Saints were on top when, with ten minutes left to play, referee John Lewis stopped the match for a time and the players left the pitch. No sooner had the game restarted than the weather worsened but the referee decided that the match should continue. Clawley had his eyes "choked with snow" and conceded two goals in the final minutes of the game. Despite Southampton's protests the FA decided that the result should stand – this was perhaps not surprising as Lewis was an eminent member of the FA board.

=== Stoke ===
In the summer of 1898, Turner returned to the Potteries when, along with Farrell and Clawley, he joined Stoke of the Football League. In his first season at the Victoria Ground, he helped Stoke reach twelfth place in the league and the semi-finals of the FA Cup. The following season he only missed a handful of matches, with Stoke's league position improving marginally, ending in ninth place.

=== Everton ===
Turner left Stoke in April 1900 to join Everton and made his debut in a 2–1 victory away to Preston North End. He scored twice in the next match, a 5–1 victory over Wolverhampton Wanderers and went on to make 36 appearances, scoring nine goals. In February 1901, he was a member of the Everton side that put Southampton out of the FA Cup, when he capped an impressive performance with Everton's third goal.

=== Return to Southampton ===
In the summer of 1901, Turner returned to Southampton, and in his second term with the Saints, he helped the club to the final of the FA Cup in 1902 and was a virtual ever-present in the two Southern League championship winning sides of 1902–03 and 1903–04.

For the start of the 1901–02 season, he replaced Alf Milward on the left with his unrelated namesake, Archie Turner, on the right. He finished the league season with nine goals from twenty appearances. In the FA Cup, he was ever-present scoring three goals from his eight matches. In the final against Sheffield United, the first match was drawn 1–1, taking the match to a replay at Crystal Palace. The replay was played in bitterly cold conditions and Saints were soon a goal down, but following smart work from Turner, Albert Brown equalised on the 70th minute with a shot from distance. United regained the lead with six minutes to go following an error by England goalkeeper, Jack Robinson, and hung on to claim the trophy.

In 1902–03, Turner scored 14 goals from 26 appearances including a hat-trick in a 6–0 victory over West Ham United in the final match of the season as the Saints took the Southern League title for the fifth time in seven years. During the following season, Turner's skills were on the wane and, by the end of the season, he had lost his regular place first to a local youngster, Fred Mouncher and then to Archie Turner's younger brother, Harry.

During his two spells with Southampton, Turner made a total of 153 first-team appearances, scoring 74 goals.

=== Later career ===
Turner left the Saints in the summer of 1904 to join fellow Southern League side New Brompton for two years, before finishing his professional career at Northampton Town.

== Career after football ==
After his football career was over, Turner returned to Stoke where he was employed in a brewery, but later settled back in Southampton where he died in 1950, aged 78.

== Career statistics ==
Club	Season	League			FA Cup		Total	
Club	Season	Division	Apps	Goals	Apps	Goals	Apps	Goals
Southampton St. Mary's	1895–96	Southern League	17	6	5	5	22	11
Southampton St. Mary's	1896–97	Southern League	19	12	7	6	26	18
Southampton St. Mary's	1897–98	Southern League	20	10	9	4	29	14
Stoke	1898–99	First Division	27	7	1	0	28	7
Stoke	1899–1900	First Division	30	8	2	0	32	8
Everton	1900–01	First Division	32	8	0	0	32	8
Southampton	1901–04	Southern League	68	28			68	28
Career Total			213	79	24	15	237	94

== Honours ==
Southampton

- FA Cup finalist: 1902
- Southern League champions: 1896–97, 1897–98, 1902–03, 1903–04
