= Jack Farrell (footballer, born 1873) =

English footballer (1873–1947)

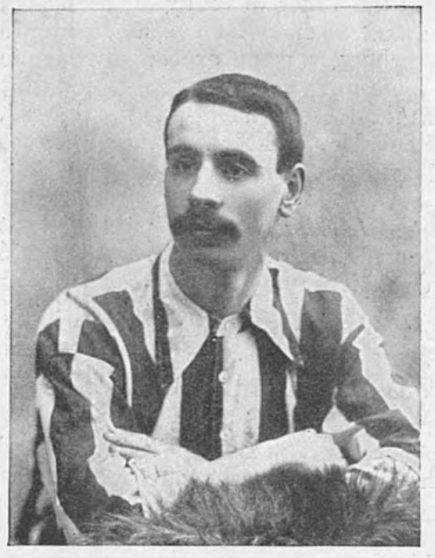

Personal information
- Full name: John Farrell
- Date of birth: 1873
- Place of birth: Tunstall, England
- Date of death: 22 February 1947 (aged 73–74)
- Position: Forward

Senior career*
Years	Team	Apps	(Gls)
- Dresden United
1894–1895	Stoke	16	(6)
1895–1898	Southampton St. Mary's	52	(28)
1898–1899	Stoke	22	(4)
1899–1900	Southampton	21	(12)
1900–1901	New Brighton Tower	31	(6)
1901–1902	Northampton Town		
1902–1903	West Ham United	20	(3)
Total		162	(59)

International career
1898	Football League	1	(2)
- * Club domestic league appearances and goals

John Farrell (1873 – 22 February 1947) was an English professional footballer who played as a forward. Farrell played in the Football League for Stoke and New Brighton Tower and played a major part in Southern League club Southampton's major cup runs at the turn of the 20th century.

== Football career ==
=== Early career ===
Farrell was born in Tunstall, Staffordshire and started his football career at Dresden United before joining Stoke in October 1894 for a fee of £40. In his first season in the Football League, he made 16 league appearances, scoring six goals as Stoke finished the season in 14th place and had to play-off against Newton Heath to retain their First Division status. Stoke easily overcame their Second Division opponents with Farrell scoring one of the three goals (the others came from Joe Schofield).

In the spring of 1895, Charles Robson, the newly appointed secretary/manager of Southampton St. Mary's, and Alfred McMinn, one of the club committee, visited "the Potteries" in search of new players to strengthen the team ready for their second season in the Southern League. McMinn was a native of Staffordshire and was "most persuasive on his home turf". On this trip, Robson and McMinn signed six players: Farrell, Samuel Meston and Willie Naughton from Stoke, Watty Keay from Derby County, Joe Turner from Dresden United and Alf Wood from Burslem Port Vale, as well as recruiting Stoke's long-serving trainer, Bill Dawson. The Saints committee were anxious to secure their services and signed them before the Football League season was over. Port Vale and Stoke lodged a complaint with the Football Association (FA) about "poaching", and an emergency FA meeting was held at Sheffield, resulting in the Saints being severely censured for negligence. St Mary's were ordered to pay their own costs, plus £4 6s 3d to Stoke and £1 13s to Port Vale. McMinn was suspended for a year and Dawson for a month. Wood's registration with St Mary's was cancelled (shortly afterwards he moved to Stoke).

=== Southampton ===
At the time of his arrival at the Antelope Ground, the local press described Farrell as "fast, tricky and reliable" – he soon justified his reputation with a series of impressive displays as centre-forward. He made his debut for "the Saints" in the opening match of the season, a 1–0 defeat at champions Millwall Athletic. Saints started the season with five away matches, four of which were defeats, with Farrell scoring twice in the only victory, a 2–1 win over Royal Ordnance Factories on 5 October. Eventually, under trainer Dawson's guidance, the team's form improved and there were only two further league defeats as the team ended the season in third place, with Farrell top-scorer with ten league goals from his 17 appearances, plus four goals from five FA Cup matches. In addition to the Southern League and FA Cup matches, the club were involved in several high-scoring friendly matches, including a 9–0 victory over the Dublin Fusiliers, a 9–1 victory over the Manchester Regiment and a 13–0 victory over the City Ramblers, in each of which Farrell scored five goals.

Farrell was again top-scorer in 1896–97 as his 13 goals from 20 appearances (ever-present) helped the Saints claim the Southern League title for the first time, going the whole league season without defeat. By now team captain, Farrell received the Championship shield from Dr. Russell Bencraft, who was both president of the League and of the club, at a ceremony in the Artillery Drill Hall in Southampton. In the FA Cup, the Saints reached the Second Round Proper where they were defeated 3–1 at Newton Heath in a replay. Farrell played in all seven cup matches, scoring seven goals, including a hat-trick in an 8–2 victory over Swindon Town at the County Ground on 2 January 1897.

In 1898, Farrell helped guide the Saints to the semi-finals of the FA Cup, scoring in the emphatic 4–0 victory over First Division Bolton Wanderers in the quarter-finals. Farrell was injured in the first semi-final match, a 1–1 draw with Nottingham Forest, and took no part in the replay when Southampton were eliminated in a controversial 2–0 defeat in a blizzard. After a scoreless first half (in which Joe Turner missed a penalty for Southampton), in the second half Saints were on top when, with ten minutes left to play, referee John Lewis stopped the match for a time and the players left the pitch. No sooner had the game restarted than the weather worsened but the referee decided that the match should continue. The Saints' goalkeeper, George Clawley, had his eyes "choked with snow" and conceded two goals in the final minutes of the game. Despite Southampton's protests the Football Association (FA) decided that the result should stand – this was perhaps not surprising as Lewis was an eminent member of the FA board.

As a result of the injury sustained in the FA Cup semi-final, Farrell missed most of the last six weeks of the League season, with David Steven coming into the side at inside-right to replace Robert Buchanan who took Farrell's place at centre-forward, to guide the Saints to the Southern League title for the second successive season.

=== Return to Stoke ===
In the 1898 close season, Farrell returned to Stoke together with George Clawley and Joe Turner. Farrell was unable to reproduce his goal-scoring form at the Victoria Ground, scoring just four goals from 22 appearances in the Football League First Division, with Stoke finishing the season in 12th place.

=== Return to Southampton ===
Farrell returned to Southampton, now playing at The Dell, in May 1899 to replace Abe Hartley who had moved on to Woolwich Arsenal. Both he and the club started the League season well with twelve wins from the first fifteen games, in which Farrell scored eleven goals, until an injury in February put Farrell out for several weeks, allowing Roddy McLeod to stake a claim for the centre-forward position. Although Farrell returned to the side in mid-March after a run of three league defeats, he was unable to find the form of the early part of the season and was in and out of the side, scoring only once from his last six appearances. Southampton finished the season in a disappointing third place having lost five of their last seven games.

In the FA Cup, Farrell and McLeod also vied for the No.9 shirt. Farrell had played in the First Round match against Everton before sustaining a dislocated collar-bone against Newcastle United in the Second Round on 10 February. This match was abandoned after 55 minutes because of heavy snow and in the rematch a week later Farrell was replaced by McLeod who scored twice in a 4–1 victory. Although McLeod had scored three goals in the first three rounds, the selectors decided to play Farrell in the semi-final against Millwall (won 3–0 after a replay on 28 March) and in the Cup Final, played on 21 April at Crystal Palace against Bury of the Football League First Division. On the day, the Southampton team failed to produce anything like their best form, conceding three goals in the first 20 minutes to eventually lose 4–0. The poor result was blamed by the local press on internal bickering between the English and Scottish players in the team, with the Scots favouring McLeod rather than the English Farrell. This was confirmed by an article in the Southampton Pictorial twelve years later:

The cause of the trouble was some little jealousy between the English and the Scottish "schools" in the team. One section wanted McLeod to play at centre forward and the other favoured Farrell. This jealousy, while it disturbed the harmony which was so essential to success, did not develop into disloyalty . . . but matters went badly for the team from the start, and some players, instead of making special efforts to save the game, attributed their non-success to the deliberate flouting of their wishes.

It was clear that Farrell had fallen out of favour and had upset Southampton's football journalists after physically threatening one of them after he had published criticism of Farrell, whereas McLeod had deputised successfully for him and had made himself popular with both the fans and the press. Whilst Farrell had the better skill when fully fit he tended to be temperamental and many of the team preferred McLeod for his more selfless contribution to the side.

In the event, both players left the club at the end of the season with McLeod moving to Brentford and Farrell joining New Brighton Tower.

=== Later career ===
Farrell spent a season at New Brighton Tower in the Football League Second Division at the end of which they finished in a creditable fourth place in the table but were forced to fold because of financial difficulties.

He then returned to the Southern League with Northampton Town for the 1901–02 season. On 29 December 1901, he returned to The Dell with Northampton, but was on the wrong end of an 11–0 scoreline, with Farrell's eventual replacement Albert Brown scoring seven of the goals.

Farrell's football career ended with a season at West Ham United where he played 20 Southern League matches, scoring three goals. His penultimate appearance was back at The Dell when he was once again on the losing side, as West Ham lost 6–0 to the Saints (with a hat-trick from England international Archie Turner) who thus claimed the Southern League title for the fifth time in seven years.

== Career after football ==
After retiring from football in the summer of 1903, Farrell returned to his native Tunstall where he became a publican.

== Career statistics ==
Appearances and goals by club, season and competition
Club	Season	League			FA Cup		Test Match		Total	
Club	Season	Division	Apps	Goals	Apps	Goals	Apps	Goals	Apps	Goals
Stoke	1894–95	First Division	16	6	0	0	1	1	17	7
Southampton St. Mary's	1895–96	Southern League	17	10	5	4	—		22	14
Southampton St. Mary's	1896–97	Southern League	20	13	7	7	—		27	20
Southampton St. Mary's	1897–98	Southern League	15	5	8	3	—		23	8
Stoke	1898–99	First Division	22	4	3	1	—		25	5
Southampton	1899–1900	Southern League	21	12	4	0	—		25	12
New Brighton Tower	1900–01	Second Division	31	6	0	0	—		31	6
West Ham United	1902–03	Southern League	20	3	1	0	—		21	3
Career total			162	59	28	15	1	1	191	75

== Honours ==
Southampton

- Southern League champions: 1896–97, 1897–98
- FA Cup finalist: 1900
