= Ernie Taylor (footballer, born 1871) =

British association football player

Personal information
- Full name: Ernest James Taylor
- Date of birth: 4 July 1871
- Place of birth: Walton-on-the-Hill, Liverpool, England
- Date of death: 13 November 1944 (aged 73)
- Place of death: Southampton, England
- Height: 5 ft 7 in (1.70 m)
- Position: Half-back

Youth career
- St. Cuthberts

Senior career*
Years	Team	Apps	(Gls)
- Stanley
1892–1893	Everton	0	(0)
1893–1896	Southampton St. Mary's	19	(1)
1896–????	Freemantle		
- * Club domestic league appearances and goals

Ernest James Taylor (4 July 1871 – 13 November 1944) was an English amateur footballer who played for Southampton in the club's first two years in the Southern League.

== Football career ==
Taylor was born in Liverpool, where he played his early club football while employed as a cashier with the American Shipping Company. While working in Liverpool, he was on the books of Everton, but failed to make any first-team appearances. In 1893, he was transferred to the shipping company's offices in Southampton.

He joined the Southampton St. Mary's club soon after his arrival in the town. On 26 April 1893, he was part of the St. Mary's team who played a friendly against Stoke of the Football League at the County Ground. Even with the future founder of football in Brazil, Charles Miller playing at outside-left, the "Saints" were "outplayed fairly and squarely on every point", losing 8–0. Despite the result, it was reported that the spectators "thoroughly enjoyed the exhibition" and looked forward to witnessing "more matches of a similar character" in future. Amongst Stoke's players were Charles Baker, Willie Naughton, Lachie Thomson and Alf Littlehales, all of whom were to move to Southampton within two years.

Taylor made his competitive debut in the FA Cup First Qualifying Round on 4 November 1893, when Southampton defeated Uxbridge 3–1, with Taylor scoring the "Saints" first goal. Taylor was not available for the next round of the FA Cup, where Southampton were defeated by Reading, but appeared in all the matches in the Hampshire Senior Cup when the Saints lost 1–0 to the Royal Engineers in the final.

In 1894, Southampton St Mary's were one of the nine founder members of the Southern League, which had been created to enable clubs in southern England who were not admitted to the Football League, to play competitive football on a regular basis. For the start of their League career, Saints signed several new players on professional contracts, including Baker, Littlehales and Thomson from Stoke and Fred Hollands from Millwall Athletic. Despite this influx of professional players, Taylor's skill enabled him "to hold his own with the best of the professionals".

Taylor was described at the time as being "a versatile player with ample resource and a great variety of methods: he plays a defensive as well as offensive game with equal success". He featured in Southampton's inaugural Southern League match, playing at left-back in a 3–1 victory over Chatham at the Antelope Ground on 6 October 1894. He went on to play in eleven of the sixteen league matches, generally at right-back as Southampton finished third at the end of the inaugural Southern League season. In the FA Cup, Saints reached the First Round proper for the first time, where they were drawn against Nottingham Forest, going down 4–1 to the Football League First Division side.

In the 1895–96 season, Taylor's work commitments restricted him to eight league and two FA Cup appearances, usually being replaced by either Joe Dale or Joe Rogers, before losing his place to new signing William McMillan in March 1896.

Taylor continued to play amateur football with Southampton's local rivals Freemantle after leaving the Saints.

== Later career ==
Taylor was actively involved with many other sporting bodies, including playing cricket for the Deanery club and golf at the Stoneham Golf Club, where he was a committee member. He was also active with the Hampshire Rugby Union.

He was later employed by White Star Line, where he was one of the founders of the annual football match to raise funds for the Seamen's Orphanage. At White Star Line, he was appointed Chief Cashier in 1922, a post he continued to hold until 1934 when he retired, shortly after White Star Line's merger with Cunard.
