= Bill Furby =

English footballer

Personal information
- Full name: William Furby
- Date of birth: 1 May 1869
- Place of birth: Leek, Staffordshire, England
- Date of death: 1946 (aged 76–77)
- Place of death: Worcester, England
- Position: Half-back

Senior career*
Years	Team	Apps	(Gls)
1894–1895	Southampton St. Mary's	5	(0)
1895–????	Freemantle		
- * Club domestic league appearances and goals

William Furby (1 May 1869 – 1949) was an English amateur footballer who played for Southampton St. Mary's in the club's first season in the Southern League.

== Football career ==
Furby was one of several players from Staffordshire who joined St. Mary's in 1894. His first recorded match was at centre-half in a Hampshire County Cricket Club Charity Cup tie on 18 April – he retained his place for the remaining two matches in this tournament including the final against Royal Artillery five days later, when he scored in a 5–0 victory.

Although he was an adaptable half-back and a good crosser of the ball, during the inaugural Southern League season, Furby's first-team opportunities were restricted due to the form of Ernie Taylor and Lachie Thomson. After only five league and two FA Cup outings, he left the "Saints" to join arch-rivals Freemantle.
