= Willie Naughton =

Scottish footballer (1870–1906)

Personal information
- Date of birth: 16 July 1870
- Place of birth: Garnkirk, Scotland
- Date of death: 23 April 1906 (aged 35)
- Place of death: Bothwell, Lanarkshire, Scotland
- Position: Outside right

Senior career*
Years	Team	Apps	(Gls)
1887–1889	Carfin Shamrock		
1888	→ Hibernian (loan)		
1889	→ Uddingston (loan)		
1889	Celtic		
1889	Carfin Shamrock		
1889–1890	Glasgow Hibernian		
1890	Wishaw Thistle		
1890–1895	Stoke	91	(24)
1895–1898	Southampton	36	(15)
1898	Carfin Rovers		
Total		127	(39)
- * Club domestic league appearances and goals

William A. Naughton (16 July 1870 – 23 April 1906) was a Scottish professional footballer, who played as an outside-forward for various clubs in Scotland and England in the 1880s and 1890s, including Celtic, Stoke and Southampton. Throughout his career he was known as "Chippy".

== Football career ==
Naughton was born in Garnkirk, north-east of Glasgow and in his teenage years played for a variety of clubs across Scotland, including Hibernian in Edinburgh and Celtic in Glasgow.

In July 1890, he moved to England to join Stoke of the Football League, for whom he made over one hundred appearances, generally at inside-right. In 1891, he was suspended for receiving payments from his club while registered as an amateur.

On 26 April 1893, he was part of the Stoke team which visited the County Ground to play a friendly match against Southampton St Mary's. Even with the future founder of football in Brazil, Charles Miller playing at outside-left, the "Saints" were "outplayed fairly and squarely on every point", losing 8–0. Despite the result, it was reported that the spectators "thoroughly enjoyed the exhibition" and looked forward to witnessing "more matches of a similar character" in future. Also playing for Stoke were Charles Baker, Lachie Thomson and Alf Littlehales, all of whom were to move to Southampton within two years.

Naughton moved to the south coast in April 1895 to join Southampton, prior to the start of their second season in the Southern League. Naughton made his debut at inside-right for the opening match of the season, a 1–0 defeat at champions Millwall, retaining his place for the remainder of the season, missing only one league match.

Naughton missed the first three matches of the 1896–97 season, returning on 24 October at outside-right. On 7 November, he scored a hat-trick in an 8–3 victory over New Brompton. He continued at outside-right for the rest of the season, scoring a total of six league goals. Described as an "inveterate practical joker", Naughton's elusive wing play and pin-point centres to forwards Jack Farrell and Bob Buchanan, helped the "Saints" to claim the Southern League title for the first of six occasions over the next eight years.

In the FA Cup, Naughton played in every match until the Saints reached the Second Round proper, where they met Newton Heath. The first match, at the County Ground on 13 February 1897 ended 1–1. As a result of an injury, Naughton was unavailable for the replay four days later, when he was replaced by James Spellacy, making his only first-team appearance for the Saints. Naughton was badly missed and Newton Heath ran out 3–1 winners.

For the next season, Southampton signed Jimmy Yates who replaced Naughton at outside-left. Naughton only made three further appearances before returning to Scotland at the end of the season.

== Later life ==
Naughton played local football in Scotland until about 1899. In 1904, he was declared "of no fixed abode" and was admitted to Kirklands Asylum in Bothwell, where he died on 23 April 1906, aged 35.

== Career statistics ==
Appearances and goals by club, season and competition
Club	Season	League			FA Cup		Test Match		Total	
Club	Season	Division	Apps	Goals	Apps	Goals	Apps	Goals	Apps	Goals
Stoke	1890–91	Football Alliance	6	2	0	0	—		6	2
Stoke	1891–92	Football League	16	3	2	0	—		18	3
Stoke	1892–93	First Division	24	6	1	0	—		25	6
Stoke	1893–94	First Division	28	10	1	0	—		29	10
Stoke	1894–95	First Division	17	3	0	0	1	0	18	3
Stoke	Total		91	24	4	0	1	0	96	24
Southampton	1895–96	Southern League	17	8	4	3	—		21	11
Southampton	1896–97	Southern League	16	6	6	0	—		22	6
Southampton	1897–98	Southern League	3	1	1	0	—		4	1
Southampton	Total		36	15	11	3	—		47	18
Career total			127	39	15	3	1	0	143	42

== Honours ==
Stoke

- Football Alliance champions: 1890–91

Southampton

- Southern League champions: 1896–97
