= Jack Angus (footballer, born 1868) =

Scottish footballer

Personal information
- Full name: John William Angus
- Date of birth: 1 December 1868
- Place of birth: Blythswood Hill, Glasgow, Scotland
- Date of death: 1933 (aged 64–65)
- Place of death: London, England
- Positions: Forward; outside left

Senior career*
| Years | Team | Apps | (Gls) |
| ?-? | Third Lanark | ? | (?) |
| 1888–1892 | Everton | 5 | (0) |
| 1892–1893 | Ardwick | 7 | (3) |
| 1893–1895 | Southampton St Mary's | 16 | (7) |
| ?-? | Fulham | ? | (?) |
| Total | | 28 | (10) |
- * Club domestic league appearances and goals

John William Angus (1 December 1868 –1933) was a Scottish professional footballer who played as an outside left for Everton during the inaugural English Football League season, 1888/89. He later appeared as a forward in Southampton's inaugural season in the Southern League, 1894/95.

== Football career ==
Born in Blythswood Hill, Glasgow, he started his career at Third Lanark, before joining English side Everton in 1888. Angus's Everton debut came on 22 December 1888, in a 3–0 reverse at Preston after an injury ruled out first choice Tom Costley. Angus would start in the following four Everton fixtures, only appearing on the winning side once, in a 2–1 home win over Stoke at Anfield.

After failing to establish himself at Everton, Angus travelled up the East Lancs Road to sign for Ardwick (later Manchester City) in March 1892. The 1892–93 season was Ardwick's first in the Football League, and Angus scored in the club's first ever League match, a 7–0 win against Bootle. Overall, he scored three league goals from seven appearances for the Manchester club. Angus then moved to the south coast to join Southampton St Mary's in the summer of 1893.

Angus was one of the first professional players signed by Southampton. He played in the Saints' two FA Cup qualifying matches in November 1893 as well as friendlies and local cup matches. Described by Holley & Chalk as "a deft and aggressive forward", he was the first Saints player to be sent off for an "over zealous" tackle in a Hampshire Senior Cup match on 24 February 1894 against local rivals Freemantle.

In 1894 Southampton were founder members of the Southern League and Angus played at inside forward, in a forward line-up including Charles Baker, Fred Hollands, Harry Offer and Herbert Ward. He scored in the "Saints"' first game in the Southern League and went on to score six goals that season, making him joint top scorer.

The following season, he made three more league appearances before leaving the club in November 1895. In all he made 23 appearances for the Saints, scoring 11 goals. He subsequently played for Fulham, but little is known about his later life.

Not to be confused with John Alexander Angus, a Scottish goalkeeper who made 11 appearances for Everton during the 1890/91 season, Everton's first championship winning campaign.
