= Donald McKay (footballer) =

Scottish footballer

Personal information
- Date of birth: 1875
- Place of birth: Scotland
- Date of death: 1950 (aged 74–75)
- Position: Full-back

Senior career*
Years	Team	Apps	(Gls)
18??–1896	Woolston Works		
1896–1897	Southampton St. Mary's	8	(0)
- * Club domestic league appearances and goals

Donald McKay was a Scottish footballer who played as a full-back for Southampton St. Mary's in 1896–97, when they won the Southern League title for the first of six occasions over the next eight years.

== Football career ==
McKay was born in Scotland and was a shipyard engineer who came to Southampton seeking work at the Woolston shipyards. He had been a regular member of the Woolston Works football team for several years before being signed by Southampton St. Mary's in the summer of 1896.

He made his debut for the "Saints" at the County Ground in the opening match of the 1896–97 season, a 4–1 victory over Chatham. He played at right-back with his fellow Scotsmen James McKie at left-back and William McMillan at right-half. McKay retained his place for a further seven league games, before being replaced by Samuel Meston, who had moved over from the left with McKie returning on the right, and spent the remainder of the season in the reserves.

The Saints won the first nine games of the season and finished unbeaten after twenty matches, thus claiming the Southern League title for the first time.

== Honours ==
Southampton St. Mary's

- Southern League champions: 1896–97
