= List of Southampton F.C. managers =

The following is a list of Southampton managers from the founding of the club in 1885 until the present. The first secretary manager of the club was Cecil Knight from 1892 to 1895; the first full-time manager of the club was George Swift from 1911 to 1912.

The most successful managers are, in terms of trophies and honours, Er Arnfield, with whom the club won the Southern Football League five times and the Western Football League Division 1A once; and (since the start of the Football League era), in terms of win percentage, Tonda Eckert.

The longest-serving manager has been Ted Bates from 1955 to 1973, for 850 matches. (Bates – "Mr Southampton" – had played for the club from 1937 to 1955, and also served as a club director for 20 years after managing it.)

== Managers ==
As of match played 21 November 2026

Name	Nationality	From	To	Matches	Won	Drawn	Lost	Win%	Honours
Cecil Knight	England	August 1892	May 1895	25	15	2	8	60.00	
Charles Robson	England	August 1895	May 1896	23	16	0	7	69.57	
Alfred McMinn	England	August 1896	May 1897	27	19	7	1	70.37	1 Southern League championship
Er Arnfield	England	August 1897	May 1911	514	268	107	139	52.14	5 Southern League championships 2 FA Cup Finals
George Swift	England	August 1911	May 1912	39	10	11	18	25.64	
Er Arnfield	England	August 1912	May 1919	121	46	25	50	38.02	
Jimmy McIntyre	England	August 1919	December 1924	209	85	77	47	40.67	1 Third Division South championship
Arthur Chadwick	England	October 1925	May 1931	256	100	60	96	39.06	
George Kay	England	May 1931	May 1936	219	76	43	100	34.70	
George Goss	England	May 1936	March 1937	32	10	8	14	31.25	
Tom Parker	England	March 1937	June 1943	97	29	22	46	29.90	
Arthur Dominy	England	June 1943	January 1946	0	0	0	0	—	
Bill Dodgin	England	January 1946	August 1949	137	65	28	44	47.45	
Sid Cann	England	August 1949	December 1951	107	41	33	33	38.32	
George Roughton	England	March 1952	September 1955	156	63	37	56	40.38	
Ted Bates	England	September 1955	November 1973	850	333	212	305	39.18	1 Third Division championship
Lawrie McMenemy	England	November 1973	June 1985	539	225	144	170	41.74	1 FA Cup; 1 Football League Cup final
Chris Nicholl	Northern Ireland	July 1985	May 1991	293	100	86	107	34.13	
Ian Branfoot	England	June 1991	January 1994	128	37	34	57	28.91	1 Full Members Cup final
Alan Ball	England	January 1994	July 1995	67	22	24	21	32.84	
David Merrington	England	July 1995	June 1996	48	15	13	20	31.25	
Graeme Souness	Scotland	July 1996	June 1997	48	14	15	19	29.17	
Dave Jones	England	June 1997	January 2000	113	37	22	54	32.74	
Glenn Hoddle	England	January 2000	March 2001	52	22	12	18	42.31	
Stuart Gray	England	March 2001	October 2001	19	6	2	11	31.58	
Gordon Strachan	Scotland	October 2001	February 2004	110	39	32	39	35.45	1 FA Cup Final
Steve Wigley (caretaker)	England	February 2004	March 2004	2	0	2	0	0.00	
Paul Sturrock	Scotland	March 2004	August 2004	13	5	2	6	38.46	
Steve Wigley	England	August 2004	December 2004	17	3	6	8	17.65	
Harry Redknapp	England	December 2004	December 2005	49	13	21	15	26.53	
Dave Bassett & Dennis Wise (caretakers)	England	December 2005	December 2005	3	1	1	1	33.33	
George Burley	Scotland	December 2005	January 2008	109	45	25	39	41.28	
John Gorman & Jason Dodd (caretakers)	England	January 2008	February 2008	6	1	1	4	16.67	
Nigel Pearson	England	February 2008	May 2008	14	3	7	4	21.43	
Jan Poortvliet	Netherlands	May 2008	January 2009	32	8	8	16	25.00	
Mark Wotte	Netherlands	January 2009	July 2009	18	4	7	7	22.22	
Alan Pardew	England	July 2009	August 2010	64	34	17	13	53.13	1 Football League Trophy
Dean Wilkins (caretaker)	England	August 2010	September 2010	3	0	0	3	0.00	
Nigel Adkins	England	September 2010	January 2013	124	67	25	32	54.03	
Mauricio Pochettino	Argentina	January 2013	May 2014	60	23	18	19	38.33	
Ronald Koeman	Netherlands	June 2014	June 2016	91	44	17	30	48.35	
Claude Puel	France	June 2016	June 2017	53	20	13	20	37.74	1 Football League Cup Final
Mauricio Pellegrino	Argentina	June 2017	March 2018	34	8	13	13	23.53	
Mark Hughes	Wales	March 2018	December 2018	27	5	10	12	18.52	
Kelvin Davis (caretaker)	England	December 2018	December 2018	1	0	0	1	0.00	
Ralph Hasenhüttl	Austria	December 2018	November 2022	173	59	41	73	34.10	
Rubén Sellés (caretaker)	Spain	November 2022	November 2022	1	0	1	0	0.00	
Nathan Jones	Wales	November 2022	February 2023	14	5	0	9	35.71	
Rubén Sellés	Spain	February 2023	May 2023	17	2	4	11	11.76	
Russell Martin	Scotland	June 2023	December 2024	73	33	14	26	45.21	1 EFL Championship play-offs winners
Simon Rusk (Interim Manager)	England	December 2024	December 2024	2	0	1	1	0.00	
Ivan Jurić	Croatia	December 2024	April 2025	16	2	1	13	12.50	
Simon Rusk (Interim Manager)	England	April 2025	May 2025	7	0	2	5	0.00	
Will Still	England	May 2025	November 2025	16	4	6	6	25.00	
Tonda Eckert	Germany	November 2025		58	35	13	10	60.34	
