= Harry Offer =

English footballer (1871–1947)

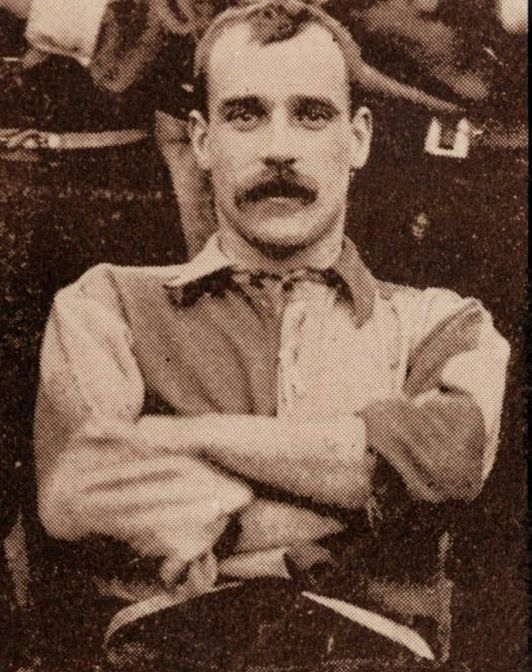

Personal information
- Full name: Henry Thomas Offer
- Date of birth: 15 July 1869
- Place of birth: Rowde, England
- Date of death: 12 January 1947 (aged 77)
- Place of death: Newport, Isle of Wight, England
- Position: Outside right

Youth career
- 1887–1889: Swindon Town

Senior career*
Years	Team	Apps	(Gls)
1889–1891	Royal Arsenal	0	(0)
1891	Burnley	0	(0)
1891–1893	Swindon Town	0	(0)
1893–1895	Southampton St Mary's	13	(4)
- * Club domestic league appearances and goals

Henry Thomas Offer (15 July 1869 – 12 January 1947) was an English footballer who scored Arsenal's first-ever goal in the FA Cup "proper" rounds in 1891, and Southampton's first-ever league goal in 1894.

== Football career ==
=== Swindon Town ===
Offer was born ar Rowde, near Devizes, Wiltshire and played for Swindon Town as a teenager, playing in defence in each of Swindon's FA Cup matches in 1887–88 and 1888–89, both of which ended in defeat, to Old Brightonians and Great Marlow respectively.

=== Royal Arsenal ===
In September 1889, Offer moved to London to join Royal Arsenal. At this time, the club were not fully professional and played mainly friendlies and Cup matches. They entered the FA Cup for the first time in 1889–90, but failed to get past the qualifying rounds. The following season, they entered the cup at the First Round proper, losing 2–1 to Derby County on 17 January 1891 with Offer scoring Arsenal's goal. In total, Offer played four times in the FA Cup for Arsenal, with one goal to his name, as well as 52 appearances and 16 appearances in other first-team games.

=== Return to Swindon Town ===
In February 1891, Offer moved to join Burnley, where he failed to break into the first-team, before returning to Swindon Town later that year. Now playing as a forward, he scored one of Swindon's goals in a 4–3 FA Cup qualifying round defeat to Luton Town on 3 October 1891. The next season, he scored again at Cowes in the first qualifying round on 15 October 1892, and played in the next three qualifying round matches, with Swindon going out to Marlow once again.

=== Southampton ===
Offer moved to Southampton St Mary's in the summer of 1893 where he signed a professional contract, as the "Saints" were putting together a side to compete with the best teams. At first, Offer was played as a full-back — according to "Holley & Chalk" he was "an aggressive player (whose) enthusiasm sometimes overtook him in efforts to obtain the ball". By the end of the 1893–94 season, Offer had reverted to his role as a forward as the Saints reached the finals of three local cup competitions, winning the Hampshire County Cricket Club Charity Cup, defeating the Royal Artillery 5–0 in the final, with Offer scoring twice.

In 1894, Southampton were one of the nine founder members of the Southern League, which had been created to enable clubs in southern England, who were not admitted to the Football League to play competitive football on a regular basis. For Southampton's inaugural league season, Offer was part of a forward line-up including Jack Angus, Charles Baker, Fred Hollands and Herbert Ward. Saints' first league match was played at The Antelope Ground on 6 October 1894; Offer opened the scoring in a 3–1 victory over Chatham.

A week later, on 13 October 1894, Southampton met Newbury in the first qualifying round of the FA Cup. Saints were "in particularly rampant mood" and won 14–0, with Offer scoring twice; this is still Southampton's biggest victory in a competitive match. Offer scored a hat-trick in a 7–3 victory over Marlow (gaining a measure of revenge for the defeats whilst with Swindon Town) in the third qualifying round as the Saints went on to reach the First Round proper for the first time, going out 1–4 to Football League First Division opponents Nottingham Forest.

Saints finished third in the league with Offer scoring four goals, to bring his total for the season to ten goals from eighteen appearances.

At the end of the season, Offer retired from his professional football career and resumed his previous trade of joiner, settling on the Isle of Wight, where he died in January 1947.
