= David Hamer (footballer) =

Welsh footballer (1869–1948)

Personal information
- Full name: David Bowen Hamer
- Date of birth: 1 February 1869
- Place of birth: Rhayader, Wales
- Date of death: 17 December 1948 (aged 79)
- Place of death: Birkenhead, England
- Height: 5 ft 8 in (1.73 m)
- Position: Full-back

Youth career
- Rhayader

Senior career*
Years	Team	Apps	(Gls)
- Royal Engineers Aldershot
1891–1892	Southampton St. Mary's	0	(0)
1892–1894	Cowes		
1894–1897	Southampton St. Mary's	8	(0)
1897–1898	Cowes		
1898–1899	Southampton	0	(0)
- * Club domestic league appearances and goals

David Bowen Hamer (1 February 1869 – 17 December 1948) (known as "Taffy") was a Welsh professional footballer who played as a full-back for Southampton St. Mary's in the early years of the Southern League.

== Football career ==
Hamer was born at Rhayader in Radnorshire, mid-Wales and enlisted in the Royal Engineers. Based at Aldershot, he was a member of the Royal Engineers team which won the Hampshire Senior Cup for two successive years in 1889 and 1890, but was on the losing side (against Southampton St. Mary's) in March 1891.

In December 1891, he left the Armed Services and shortly afterwards he joined Southampton St. Mary's. He remained at the Antelope Ground until the end of the season, playing in the final of the Hampshire County Cricket Club Charity Cup, when the "Saints" were defeated by Hamer's previous club, the Royal Engineers.

Hamer then moved to the Isle of Wight where he spent two seasons with Cowes, before returning to Southampton in 1894 for their inaugural season in the Southern League. Described as "possessing a terrific volley and deceptive speed for a big man" (his weight was recorded as 13 st 4 lb (84 kg)) he never commanded a regular place in the Saints' side making a total of twelve appearances over the next three seasons.

He made his first-class debut in the opening match of the 1894–95 season, a 3–1 victory over Chatham on 6 October 1894, playing at left-half and retained his place for the following two league matches (at left-back) before losing his place to Bill Jeffrey in November. Hamer also made three appearances in the early rounds of the FA Cup, including the 14–0 victory over Newbury in the first qualifying round on 13 October 1894 – this is still Southampton's biggest victory in a competitive match.

In the following season, Hamer made five appearances as cover for Lachie Thomson, with his final game for the "Saints" coming on 13 March 1897 (replacing Samuel Meston in a 6–2 victory over Northfleet). During his time with St. Mary's, Hamer won a total of twenty caps for the Hampshire F.A., including one run of thirteen matches in succession.

Hamer then returned to Cowes for a further season before re-joining Southampton in 1898 in their new home at The Dell as assistant first-team coach, turning out occasionally for the reserves.

== Later career ==
In December 1899, Hamer was recalled to active service and was sent to South Africa, where he saw action in the Boer War with the 1st Telegraph Division, Royal Engineers.

After leaving the Army in November 1902, he briefly settled in the Southampton area. In 1908, he moved to Long Island, New York, working as a tunnel miner, before moving to a similar role in Dundas, Ontario.

He returned to England in 1920 and became the proprietor of a fish and chip shop in Birkenhead, where he died in 1948, aged 79.
