= Herbert Williamson =

English footballer

Personal information
- Date of birth: 1871
- Place of birth: Manchester, England
- Date of death: 1946 (aged 74–75)
- Place of death: Farnworth, Lancashire, England
- Position: Goalkeeper

Senior career*
Years	Team	Apps	(Gls)
1894–1895	Southampton St. Mary's	12	(0)
1896	Royal Ordnance Factories	7	(0)
- * Club domestic league appearances and goals

Herbert Williamson (1871–1946) was an amateur footballer who played as a goalkeeper for Southampton St. Mary's and Royal Ordnance Factories in the mid-1890s.

Williamson made his debut for Southampton in the third match of the inaugural Southern League season, replacing Walter Cox. Despite conceding a goal within three minutes of his debut (a 2–2 draw with Millwall Athletic) Williamson soon settled into the role and helped the club through their first league season.

In the summer of 1895, Williamson left the Southampton area and moved to London to find work. In 1896, he joined the Royal Ordnance Factories team at Maze Hill, Greenwich, also playing in the Southern League. Williamson was an ever-present for the Ordnance Factories team, conceding 46 goals in seven matches, including ten in a match against his former side at the Antelope Ground in October 1896. As a result of financial difficulties, the club folded mid-season and their record was expunged.
