= Arthur Nineham =

English footballer

Personal information
- Full name: George Arthur Nineham
- Date of birth: 23 July 1873
- Place of birth: Southampton, England
- Date of death: 8 May 1950 (aged 76)
- Place of death: Bitterne Park, Southampton, England
- Position: Forward

Senior career*
Years	Team	Apps	(Gls)
1892–1895	Southampton St. Mary's	7	(4)
1895–????	Freemantle		
- * Club domestic league appearances and goals

George Arthur Nineham (23 July 1873 – 8 May 1950) was an English amateur footballer who played as a forward for Southampton St. Mary's in the 1890s. He was one of the few locally born players to make the transition from mainly friendly matches to Southern League football.

== Football career ==
Nineham was born in Southampton and joined the recently created Southampton St. Mary's club in late 1892. His first recorded appearance was at inside-right in a Hampshire Senior Cup semi-final match against Portsmouth on 4 February 1893. This match ended 2–0 to "the Saints" who met then arch local rivals, Freemantle in the final. The Saints had won the trophy in each of the previous two years and were favourites to make it a hat-trick, but Freemantle won the match with a hotly disputed penalty late in the match.

In 1893–94, Nineham played in the first qualifying round of the FA Cup, a 3–1 victory against Uxbridge but lost his place to Bob Kiddle for the next match at Reading. Nineham did, however, appear regularly in various local cup competitions, helping the Saints reach three finals, winning the Hampshire County Cricket Club Charity Cup, defeating the Royal Artillery 5–0 in the final.

In 1894, Southampton were one of the nine founder members of the Southern League, which had been created to enable clubs in southern England, who were not admitted to the Football League to play competitive football on a regular basis. Nineham, who enjoyed taking on and beating defenders, made his league debut in the opening match, playing at outside-right in a 3–1 victory over Chatham on 6 October 1894.

In the next match, Southampton met Newbury on 13 October 1894 in the first qualifying round of the FA Cup at the Antelope Ground. Saints were "in particularly rampant mood" and won 14–0, with Nineham and Herbert Ward scoring hat-tricks; this is still Southampton's biggest victory in a competitive match. He made one further FA Cup appearance, scoring twice against Warmley in the fourth qualifying round.

His league appearances during the 1894–95 season were fairly infrequent, making seven in total, scoring four goals as the Saints ended their inaugural league season in third place.

== Later career ==
Nineham left St. Mary's in the summer of 1895, to join Freemantle. He was employed at Southampton Docks throughout his working life and committed suicide in May 1950, aged 77.
