= Alf Littlehales =

English footballer

Personal information
- Full name: Alfred Littlehales
- Date of birth: 1867
- Place of birth: Wellington, Shropshire, England
- Date of death: 18 November 1942 (aged 75)
- Place of death: Southampton, England
- Position: Centre half

Senior career*
Years	Team	Apps	(Gls)
–1892	Wolverhampton Wanderers		
1892–1894	Stoke	0	(0)
1894–1898	Southampton	51	(9)
- * Club domestic league appearances and goals

Alfred Littlehales (1867 – 18 November 1942) was an English professional footballer who played at centre-half for Southampton in the 1890s.

== Football career ==
Littlehales was born in Wellington, Shropshire and started his football career with Wolverhampton Wanderers, before joining Stoke in August 1892.

On 26 April 1893, he was part of the Stoke team which visited the County Ground to play a friendly match against Southampton St Mary's. Even with the future founder of football in Brazil, Charles Miller playing at outside-left, the "Saints" were "outplayed fairly and squarely on every point", losing 8–0. Despite the result, it was reported that the spectators "thoroughly enjoyed the exhibition" and looked forward to witnessing "more matches of a similar character" in future. Also playing for Stoke were Charles Baker, Lachie Thomson and Willie Naughton, all of whom were to move to Southampton within two years.

In 1894, Southampton St Mary's were one of the nine founder members of the Southern League, which had been created to enable clubs in southern England who were not admitted to the Football League, to play competitive football on a regular basis. For the start of their League career, Saints signed several new players on professional contracts, including Baker, Littlehales and Thomson from Stoke and Fred Hollands from Millwall.

Prior to the start of the new season, Littlehales was interviewed by the local sporting weekly, "Southern Referee" — although he confessed to knowing little "from actual experience" about any of the Southern League opponents, he did not "expect to lose much; not down here at any rate. I'm certain we shall make them all go". He made his Southampton debut in their inaugural Southern League match, a 3–1 victory over Chatham played at the Antelope Ground on 6 October 1894. Described as "clever on the ball and the owner of a hard shot", Littlehales was ever-present in the League as Saints finished the 1894–95 season in third place. In the FA Cup, Saints reached the First Round proper for the first time, where they were drawn against Nottingham Forest, going down 4–1 to the Football League First Division side.

In the 1895–96 season, Littlehales missed only one League match, scoring four goals with Saints again finishing in third place. As in the previous year, they also reached the First Round proper of the FA Cup, where they again met Football League opposition when they were defeated 3–2 by The Wednesday.

Littlehales missed three matches at the start of the 1896–97 season, with Harry Haynes taking over. He returned on 7 November, playing at centre-forward, scoring twice in an 8–3 victory over New Brompton. He retained his place for the rest of the season, scoring five goals as the Saints claimed the Southern League title for the first of six occasions over the next eight years. Littlehales was ever-present in the FA Cup where the Saints reached the Second Round proper, losing 3–1 to Newton Heath after a replay.

Littlehales' final match for the Saints came in the first match of the 1897–98 season, a 2–0 defeat at Tottenham, following which he lost his place to new signing Arthur Chadwick. In January 1898, he was rewarded with a benefit match against Eastleigh and retired at the end of the season. In his three full seasons with the Saints, Littlehales had made 68 appearances, including 17 in the FA Cup, scoring 12 goals.

Following his retirement, he settled in the Bevois Town area of Southampton and died in the city on 18 November 1942.

== Honours ==
Southampton

- Southern League champions: 1896–97 & 1898–99
