= William Ponting =

English footballer

Personal information
- Full name: William Robert Ponting
- Date of birth: 1872
- Place of birth: Andover, Hampshire, England
- Date of death: 21 March 1952 (aged 79–80)
- Place of death: Hendon, London, England
- Position: Half-back

Youth career
- Andover

Senior career*
Years	Team	Apps	(Gls)
18??–1897	Ryde Sports F.C.		
1897	Southampton St. Mary's	5	(0)
1897–????	Andover		
-1900	Ryde Sports F.C.		
1900-1901	Queens Park Rangers	1	
1901-1902	Shepherd's Bush		
- * Club domestic league appearances and goals

William Robert Ponting (1872 – 21 March 1952) was an English amateur footballer who played as a half-back for Southampton St. Mary's in 1896–97, when they won the Southern League title for the first of six occasions over the next eight years.

== Football career ==
Ponting was born in Andover, Hampshire where he became a schoolmaster. He was a leading amateur player for his local club and had been captain of the Hampshire County Junior XI in 1893.

In March 1897, John Hodgkinson, the Southampton St. Mary's left-half was injured and the "Saints" called Ponting into the side for the remaining five matches of the season. Ponting made his debut in a 5–1 victory at Reading on 31 March and played his part in the run-in to Southampton's first Southern League title.

== Later career ==
In the summer of 1897, Ponting returned to his teaching career. In the 1930s, he was working in the City of London as an insurance broker.

== Honours ==
Southampton

- Southern League champions: 1896–97
