= Lachie Thomson =

English footballer

Personal information
- Full name: William James Gay Thomson
- Date of birth: 9 June 1873
- Place of birth: Chatham, Kent, England
- Date of death: 23 November 1940 (aged 67)
- Place of death: Southampton, England
- Position: Full-back

Youth career
- Strathmore (Dundee)

Senior career*
Years	Team	Apps	(Gls)
1892–1894	Stoke	9	(0)
1894–1896	Southampton St Mary's	27	(1)
1896–1900(?)	Cowes		
- * Club domestic league appearances and goals

William James Gay "Lachie" Thomson (9 June 1873 – 23 November 1940) was an English professional footballer who played as a defender for Stoke in the Football League before joining Southampton St Mary's for the inaugural Southern League season in 1894.

== Football career ==
=== Stoke ===
Thomson was born in Chatham, Kent and joined Stoke in July 1892. Stoke had struggled during the early years of the Football League, finishing each of the first three seasons at or near the foot of the table. For the 1892–93 season, they were able to field a settled team which was reflected in their league position, finishing in seventh position. During this season, Thomson was an understudy to the former England international left-back, Alf Underwood, and as a consequence only made seven first-team appearances.

On 26 April 1893, he was part of a Stoke side who were invited to play a friendly match against Southampton St Mary's, played at the County Cricket ground in Northlands Road, Southampton. The "Saints", who included the 18-year-old Charles Miller (considered to be the father of football in Brazil) in their line-up, were "outplayed fairly and squarely on every point", although the spectators "thoroughly enjoyed the exhibition" and looked forward to witnessing "more matches of a similar character" in future. Also playing for Stoke were Charles Baker, Willie Naughton and Alf Littlehales, all of whom were to move to Southampton within two years.

Although Underwood had effectively retired in the summer of 1893 (making only two further appearances for Stoke), Thomson now found his way into the first-team blocked by Billy Dickson, who had been moved back from inside-right. As a consequence, Thomson made only two appearances in the No. 3 shirt.

=== Southampton ===
By the end of the season, Thomson had moved to Southampton, and appeared in the "Saints" matches in the Hampshire County Cricket Club Charity Cup, played at the County Ground in April 1894, with the Saints emerging victorious, defeating the Royal Artillery 5–0 in the final. Described as "strong, with plenty of pluck, he (played) the game with judgement as well as energy".

In 1894, Southampton were one of the nine founder members of the Southern League, which had been created to enable clubs in southern England, who were not admitted to the Football League to play competitive football on a regular basis. For Southampton's inaugural league season, Thomson was one of three players recruited from Stoke, together with Charles Baker and Alf Littlehales. Thomson and Littlehales, together with Bill Jeffery (recruited from Woolwich Arsenal) and local men George Marshall and Ernie Taylor, were the mainstay of the Saints' defence throughout the season in which they finished in third place.

In the FA Cup, Southampton played through all four qualifying rounds, scoring 31 goals to six conceded, but were defeated in the First Round proper, going out 1–4 to Football League First Division opponents Nottingham Forest.

The 1895–96 season followed a similar pattern to the previous year, with Southampton finishing third, behind Millwall Athletic and Luton Town, and reaching the First Round proper of the FA Cup, where they were defeated by a First Division club; this time it was Sheffield Wednesday who ran out 3–2 victors. Thomson appeared in all five Cup matches as well as twelve league matches, occasionally playing at left-half.

In 1896, he moved to the Isle of Wight, to join Cowes. In his two years with Southampton, he made a total of 37 appearances, scoring twice.

=== Cowes ===
Thomson remained with Cowes until the turn of the century, helping them to join the Southern League in Division Two South-West in 1898. Cowes took the Division title, winning all ten matches played. The overall Southern League Division Two title went to Thames Ironworks after a play-off match; Cowes were then required to contest a Test Match against the Royal Artillery, which was won 4–1. Cowes were unable to survive financially in the Southern League First Division and, after 13 matches, they withdrew from the competition.

== Career statistics ==
Appearances and goals by club, season and competition
Club	Season	League			FA Cup		Total	
Club	Season	Division	Apps	Goals	Apps	Goals	Apps	Goals
Stoke	1892–93	First Division	7	0	0	0	7	0
Stoke	1893–94	First Division	2	0	0	0	2	0
Stoke	Total		9	0	0	0	9	0
Southampton St Mary's	1894–95	Southern League	15	1	5	1	20	2
Southampton St Mary's	1895–96	Southern League	12	0	5	0	17	0
Southampton St Mary's	Total		27	1	10	1	37	2
Career total			36	1	10	1	46	2

== Honours ==
Cowes

- Southern League Division Two South-West champions: 1898–99
