= Samuel Meston =

Scottish footballer

Personal information
- Full name: Samuel Meston
- Date of birth: 16 January 1872
- Place of birth: Arbroath, Scotland
- Date of death: 14 August 1948 (aged 76)
- Place of death: Ashurst, Hampshire, England
- Height: 5 ft 10 in (1.78 m)
- Position: Half-back

Senior career*
| Years | Team | Apps | (Gls) |
- Arbroath Victoria
| 1894–1895 | Stoke | 11 | (2) |
| 1895–1906 | Southampton | 246 | (18) |
| 1906–1907 | Salisbury City | | |
| 1907–1909 | Croydon Common | 18 | (1) |
| 1909 | Salisbury City | | |
| 1911 | Chandler's Ford | | |
| 1913 | Eastleigh Athletic | | |
| Total | | 275 | (21) |
- * Club domestic league appearances and goals

Samuel Meston (16 January 1872 – 14 August 1948) was a Scottish professional footballer who played as a half-back for Stoke and Southampton. Whilst with Southampton, he appeared in two FA Cup Finals and won six Southern League championship medals, being the only player ever to do so.

== Playing career ==
Meston was born in Arbroath and started his career with his local team, Arbroath Victoria before signing as a professional with Stoke in January 1894. Meston spent two seasons at the Victoria Ground making thirteen appearances scoring four goals. At the end of the 1894–95 season, he joined Southampton, together with several other Stoke players and soon proved to be one of the most valuable players signed for the Saints in their Southern League days. His trademark hard shots were nicknamed Long Toms after a cannon used during the Boer War and elsewhere.

He played in a variety of positions, although his favourite position was at right-half. Whilst at Southampton, he won a record six Southern League championship medals and appeared in the FA Cup finals in 1900, defeating three First division clubs on the way, and 1902. He made a total of 288 appearances for the Saints, including 42 in the FA Cup (a total only exceeded by Terry Paine and Nick Holmes).

After 11 seasons with the Saints, he left in May 1906 to join Salisbury City and also played for Croydon Common and Eastleigh Athletic.

After leaving full-time football, he worked as a brake-fitter at the Eastleigh railway depot.

Two decades later his son, Sammy Meston also played for Southampton, as well as for Everton and Tranmere Rovers.

== Career statistics ==
| Club | Season | League | | | FA Cup | | Total | |
| Club | Season | Division | Apps | Goals | Apps | Goals | Apps | Goals |
|---|---|---|---|---|---|---|---|---|
| Stoke | 1893–94 | First Division | 1 | 0 | 0 | 0 | 1 | 0 |
| Stoke | 1894–95 | First Division | 10 | 2 | 2 | 2 | 12 | 4 |
| Stoke | Total | | 11 | 2 | 2 | 2 | 13 | 4 |
| Southampton | 1895–96 | Southern League First Division | 18 | 0 | 5 | 1 | 23 | 1 |
| Southampton | 1896–97 | Southern League First Division | 19 | 4 | 7 | 0 | 26 | 4 |
| Southampton | 1897–98 | Southern League First Division | 22 | 2 | 9 | 1 | 31 | 3 |
| Southampton | 1898–99 | Southern League First Division | 18 | 1 | 3 | 0 | 21 | 1 |
| Southampton | 1899–1900 | Southern League First Division | 27 | 3 | 6 | 0 | 33 | 3 |
| Southampton | 1900–01 | Southern League First Division | 28 | 2 | 1 | 0 | 29 | 2 |
| Southampton | 1901–02 | Southern League First Division | 26 | 4 | 8 | 0 | 34 | 4 |
| Southampton | 1902–03 | Southern League First Division | 24 | 1 | 1 | 0 | 25 | 1 |
| Southampton | 1903–04 | Southern League First Division | 24 | 1 | 2 | 0 | 26 | 1 |
| Southampton | 1904–05 | Southern League First Division | 18 | 0 | 0 | 0 | 18 | 0 |
| Southampton | 1905–06 | Southern League First Division | 22 | 0 | 0 | 0 | 22 | 0 |
| Southampton | Total | | 246 | 18 | 42 | 2 | 288 | 20 |
| Career Total | | | 257 | 20 | 44 | 4 | 301 | 24 |

== Honours ==
Southampton

- Southern League First Division: 1896–97, 1897–98, 1898–99, 1900–01, 1902–03, 1903–04
- FA Cup finalist: 1900, 1902
