= Fred Hollands =

English footballer

Personal information
- Full name: Frederick George Hollands
- Date of birth: 3 October 1870
- Place of birth: Poplar, London, England
- Date of death: 1948 (aged 77)
- Place of death: Bromley, Kent, England
- Position: Outside left

Senior career*
Years	Team	Apps	(Gls)
1890–1894	Millwall Athletic	0	(0)
1894–1895	Southampton St Mary's	15	(3)
1895–1896	Millwall Athletic		
1896–1897	Fulham	6	(2)
- * Club domestic league appearances and goals

Frederick George Hollands (3 October 1870 – 1948) was an English professional footballer who played as an outside-forward for Millwall Athletic and Southampton St Mary's in the 1890s.

== Football career ==
Hollands was born in Poplar and started his football career with local club, Millwall Rovers, when the club were restricted to friendlies and appearances in the early rounds of the FA Cup. During Hollands' time with the club, Millwall reached the third qualifying round in 1892 where they were defeated 3–4 by local rivals, Woolwich Arsenal. The following year, (now known as Millwall Athletic) they again reached the third qualifying round against Woolwich Arsenal, with the "Gunners" running out 2–0 winners.

In the 1894 close-season, Hollands moved to Hampshire to join Southampton St Mary's. In 1894, Southampton St Mary's, together with Millwall Athletic, were one of the nine founder members of the Southern League, which had been created to enable clubs in southern England who were not admitted to the Football League, to play competitive football on a regular basis. For the start of their League career, Saints signed several new players on professional contracts, including Charles Baker, Lachie Thomson and Alf Littlehales from Stoke and Hollands from Millwall.

Hollands made his debut for the "Saints" in their inaugural Southern League match, a 3–1 victory over Chatham played at the Antelope Ground on 6 October 1894, when he scored the second goal. Described as "a small, fair-haired left-winger", Hollands was a "smart, nimble dribbler". Hollands retained his place at outside-left, playing in every League and FA Cup match, except the final match of the season. Southampton finished the league season in third place, eight points behind the champions, Hollands' former club, Millwall Athletic.

In the FA Cup, Southampton met Newbury in the first qualifying round on 13 October 1894. The Saints were "in particularly rampant mood" and won 14–0, with Hollands scoring twice; this is still Southampton's biggest victory in a competitive match. The Saints went on to reach the First Round proper for the first time, going out 1–4 to Football League First Division opponents Nottingham Forest.

In July 1895, Hollands returned to London to re-join Millwall Athletic, helping them to retain their Southern League title in 1895–96 before being re-instated as an amateur in 1896.
