= Er Arnfield =

English football manager and secretary

Er (sometimes Ernest) Arnfield (25 December 1853 – 8 August 1945) was an English football manager who was secretary/manager of Southampton F.C. from 1897 to 1911, and again from 1912 to 1919.

Arnfield was born in Mellor, Derbyshire. He died in Southampton, aged 91.

== Honours ==
Southampton

- Southern League champions: 1897–98, 1898–99, 1900–01, 1902–03, 1903–04
- FA Cup finalists: 1900, 1902
