= Walter Cox (footballer, born 1872) =

English footballer

Personal information
- Date of birth: 1872
- Place of birth: Southampton, England
- Date of death: 1930 (aged 57)
- Position: Goalkeeper

Senior career*
Years	Team	Apps	(Gls)
1892–1897	Southampton St. Mary's	3	(0)
1897–1898	Bristol St George		
1898–1899	Bedminster		
1899–1900	Millwall Athletic		
1900–1901	Manchester City	1	(0)
1901–1906	Bury	0	(0)
1906	Preston North End	0	(0)
1906–1907	Dundee		
- * Club domestic league appearances and goals

Walter Tom Cox (1872–1930) was an English footballer who played as a goalkeeper for various clubs around the turn of the 20th century.

== Football career ==
Cox was born in Southampton and started playing for the newly formed Southampton St Mary's club in 1892 as an outfield player. He later converted to a goalkeeper and made his first-team debut when he replaced Jack Barrett in an FA Cup match at the Antelope Ground against Reading on 3 November 1894. Cox retained his place for the next cup match against Marlow before being replaced by H. Williamson.

Cox made his Southern League debut away to Royal Ordnance on 5 October 1895 before Tom Cain took over as the first-choice 'keeper. Although Cain was preferred for League matches, Cox played in all five FA Cup matches, where the club reached the First Round proper for the second consecutive season, going down 3–2 to The Wednesday of the Football League First Division. Despite conceding three goals, Cox "performed heroically" and as a result won County recognition.

Following the arrival of George Clawley, Cox moved to Bristol where, after a season playing for Bristol St George in the Birmingham & District League, he returned to the Southern League with Bedminster in May 1898. In October 1899, he moved on to Millwall Athletic and then to Manchester City in May 1900. At Hyde Road, Cox was used as cover for Charlie Williams and made only one league appearance before moving on to Bury.

He failed to make any first team appearances at either Bury or his next club Preston North End and finished his career in Scotland with Dundee.
