= Charles Baker (footballer) =

English footballer

Personal information
- Full name: Charles Henry Baker
- Date of birth: April qtr. 1867
- Place of birth: Stafford, England
- Date of death: 10 July 1924 (aged 57)
- Height: 5 ft 9 in (1.75 m)
- Position: Inside forward

Youth career
- 1887: Stafford Rangers

Senior career*
Years	Team	Apps	(Gls)
1889–1891	Stoke	30	(13)
1891–1893	Wolverhampton Wanderers	37	(6)
1893–1894	Stoke	4	(0)
1894–1896	Southampton St Mary's	33	(11)
1897	Stafford Rangers		
Total		104	(30)
- * Club domestic league appearances and goals

Charles Henry Baker (1867 – 10 July 1924) was an English footballer who played in the Football League for Stoke and Wolverhampton Wanderers. He also played in the Southern League with Southampton.

== Playing career ==
Born in Stafford, he first played for Stafford Rangers before joining Stoke in April 1889. He made one appearance at the end of the 1888–89 season; the following season he appeared fairly regularly making twelve league appearances, scoring twice as Stoke finished at the foot of the Football League table and failed to be re-elected for the following season. As a consequence, Stoke played 1890–91 in the Football Alliance, finishing the season as champions.

In August 1891, he moved to Wolverhampton Wanderers where he played alongside Will Devey and England international forwards Harry Wood and Robert Topham. In 1891–92 he was a virtual ever-present, making 24 appearances in the league scoring five goals, as well as four FA Cup appearances (four goals). The following season, he lost his place to Joe Butcher and returned to Stoke in January 1893.

Although he made four appearances for Stoke at the end of the 1892–93 season, he made no appearances at all in the first team in the following season, presumably as a result of injury.

On 26 April 1893, he was part of a Stoke side who were invited to play a friendly match against Southampton St Mary's, played at the County Cricket ground in Northlands Road, Southampton. The "Saints", who included the 18-year-old Charles Miller (considered to be the father of football in Brazil) in their line-up, were "outplayed fairly and squarely on every point", although the spectators "thoroughly enjoyed the exhibition" and looked forward to witnessing "more matches of a similar character" in future. Also playing for Stoke were Alf Littlehales, Willie Naughton and Lachie Thomson, all of whom were to move to Southampton within two years.

In the summer of 1894, along with fellow Stoke players Lachie Thomson and Alf Littlehales, he was persuaded to move to the south coast, where Southampton were about to embark on their first season in the new Southern League. He was appointed the first team captain and "his surges down the right wing made him a favourite with the Southampton faithful". He scored a hat trick in an FA Cup qualifying match at the Antelope Ground against Reading on 3 November 1894, as well as scoring in the next two matches as the Saints progressed to the first round proper where they lost 4–1 to Nottingham Forest. Baker went on to score a total of twelve (six league and six FA Cup) goals that season, making him the club's top scorer.

According to Holley & Chalk, he was "a neat dribbler, (who) had a firm command over the ball and could centre with precision" In 1895–96 he was an ever-present as Southampton finished the season in third place. His Southampton career covered 42 first-team appearances, in which he scored 17 goals.

At the end of the season he announced his retirement from football; the club presented him with a gold watch, before Baker returned to Stafford to take up the trade of shoemaker.

== Career statistics ==
Appearances and goals by club, season and competition
Club	Season	League			FA Cup		Total	
Club	Season	Division	Apps	Goals	Apps	Goals	Apps	Goals
Stoke	1888–89	Football League	1	0	0	0	1	0
Stoke	1889–90	Football League	12	2	4	0	16	2
Stoke	1890–91	Football Alliance	17	11	0	0	17	11
Stoke	Total		30	13	4	0	34	13
Wolverhampton Wanderers	1891–92	Football League	24	5	4	4	28	9
Wolverhampton Wanderers	1892–93	First Division	13	1	0	0	13	1
Wolverhampton Wanderers	Total		37	6	4	4	43	10
Stoke	1892–93	First Division	4	0	0	0	4	0
Southampton St Mary's	1894–95	Southern League	15	6	4	6	19	12
Southampton St Mary's	1895–96	Southern League	18	5	5	0	23	5
Southampton St Mary's	Total		33	11	9	6	42	17
Career total			104	30	17	10	123	40

== Honours ==
Stoke

- Football Alliance champions: 1890–91
