= 1895–96 Southern Football League =

The 1895–96 season was the second in the history of the Southern League. Luton Town applied for election to the Football League. However, the election was not successful. Millwall Athletic won Division One for the second successive season.

== Division One ==
Southern Football League Division One
- Season: 1895–96
- Champions: Millwall Athletic (2nd title)
- Promoted: none
- Relegated: Luton Town (resigned); Clapton (resigned); Ilford
- Matches: 90
- Goals: 406 (4.51 per match)

Division One featured one new club, who had been promoted from Division Two the previous season: New Brompton.

Pos	Team	Pld	W	D	L	GF	GA	GR	Pts	Qualification or relegation
1	Millwall Athletic	18	16	1	1	75	16	4.688	33	
2	Luton Town	18	13	1	4	68	14	4.857	27	Left to join the United League at end of season
3	Southampton St. Mary's	18	12	0	6	44	23	1.913	24	
4	Reading	18	11	1	6	45	38	1.184	23	
5	Chatham Town	18	9	2	7	43	45	0.956	20	
6	New Brompton	18	7	4	7	30	37	0.811	18	
7	Swindon Town	18	6	4	8	38	41	0.927	16	
8	Clapton	18	4	2	12	30	67	0.448	10	Relegation test matches, left league despite winning
9	Royal Ordnance Factories	18	3	3	12	23	44	0.523	9	Relegation test matches
10	Ilford	18	0	0	18	10	81	0.123	0	Relegation test matches, left league after losing

Rules for classification: The system of using goal average to separate two teams tied on points was used until the 1976–77 season. The points system: 2 points for a win, 1 point for a draw and 0 points for losing.

== Division Two ==
Southern Football League Division Two
- Season: 1895–96
- Champions: Wolverton LNWR
- Promoted: Wolverton LNWR; Sheppey United
- Relegated: Guildford (resigned); Bromley (resigned); Windsor & Eton (resigned)
- Matches: 72
- Goals: 282 (3.92 per match)

Division Two featured four new clubs, all of which were newly elected:

- 1st Scots Guards
- Guildford
- Windsor & Eton
- Wolverton LNWR

Pos	Team	Pld	W	D	L	GF	GA	GR	Pts	Qualification or relegation
1	Wolverton LNWR	16	13	1	2	43	10	4.300	27	Promotion test matches
2	Sheppey United	16	11	3	2	60	19	3.158	25	Promotion test matches
3	1st Scots Guards	16	8	5	3	37	22	1.682	21	Promotion test matches
4	Uxbridge	16	9	1	6	28	23	1.217	19	
5	Old St.Stephen's	16	6	3	7	34	21	1.619	15	
6	Guildford	16	7	1	8	29	41	0.707	15	Left league at end of season
7	Maidenhead	16	4	1	11	20	49	0.408	9	
8	Chesham	16	2	3	11	15	48	0.313	7	
9	Bromley	16	2	2	12	16	49	0.327	6	Left league at end of season
10	Windsor & Eton	1	0	0	1	0	0	—	0	Resigned from league after one match, record expunged

Rules for classification: The system of using goal average to separate two teams tied on points was used until the 1976–77 season. The points system: 2 points for a win, 1 point for a draw and 0 points for losing.

== Promotion-relegation test matches ==
At the end of the season, test matches were held between the bottom three clubs in Division One and the top three clubs in Division Two. Wolverton LNWR and Sheppey United were promoted after the play-offs, whilst Clapton remained in Division One. Although they later resigned from the league, 1st Scot Guards (who they had beaten in the play-offs) were not promoted in their place, and instead Royal Ordnance Factories kept their place in Division One.

Division One clubs	v	Division Two clubs

Ilford	0 – 2	Wolverton LNWR

Royal Ordnance Factories	2 – 4	Sheppey United

Clapton	4 – 1	1st Scots Guards

== Football League elections ==
Luton Town applied for election to Division Two of the Football League. However, in the election they were unsuccessful.

Club	League	Votes
Blackpool	Lancashire League	19
Walsall Town Swifts	Midland League	16
Gainsborough Trinity	Midland League	15
Burslem Port Vale	Football League	10
Luton Town	Southern League	10
Crewe Alexandra	Football League	4
Fairfield	Lancashire League	3
Glossop North End	The Combination	3
Tottenham Hotspur	Southern League	2
Macclesfield	The Combination	2
