= 1897–98 Southern Football League =

The 1897–98 season was the fourth in the history of the Southern League. Southampton won the Division One championship for the second successive season. Bristol City applied for election to Division Two of the Football League. However, they were not elected.

== Division One ==
Southern Football League Division One
- Season: 1897–98
- Champions: Southampton (2nd title)
- Promoted: none
- Relegated: Northfleet; Wolverton L&NWR
- Matches: 132
- Goals: 507 (3.84 per match)

A total of 12 teams contest the division, including eleven sides from previous season and one new team.

Newly elected team:

- Bristol City

Pos	Team	Pld	W	D	L	GF	GA	GR	Pts	Qualification
1	Southampton	22	18	1	3	53	18	2.944	37	
2	Bristol City	22	13	7	2	67	33	2.030	33	
3	Tottenham Hotspur	22	12	4	6	52	31	1.677	28	
4	Chatham Town	22	12	4	6	50	34	1.471	28	
5	Reading	22	8	7	7	39	31	1.258	23	
6	New Brompton	22	9	4	9	37	37	1.000	22	
7	Sheppey United	22	10	1	11	40	49	0.816	21	
8	Gravesend United	22	7	6	9	28	39	0.718	20	
9	Millwall Athletic	22	8	2	12	48	45	1.067	18	
10	Swindon Town	22	7	2	13	36	48	0.750	16	
11	Northfleet	22	4	3	15	29	60	0.483	11	Relegation test matches
12	Wolverton L&NWR	22	3	1	18	28	82	0.341	7	Relegation test matches

Rules for classification: The system of using goal average to separate two teams tied on points was used until the 1976-77 season. The points system: 2 points for a win, 1 point for a draw and 0 points for losing.

== Division Two ==
Southern Football League Division Two
- Season: 1897–98
- Champions: Royal Artillery Portsmouth
- Promoted: Royal Artillery Portsmouth; Warmley
- Relegated: Dartford (resigned); RETB Chatham (resigned)
- Matches: 132
- Goals: 652 (4.94 per match)

A total of 12 teams contest the division, including ten sides from previous season and two new teams.

Newly elected teams:

- Royal Artillery Portsmouth
- St Albans

Pos	Team	Pld	W	D	L	GF	GA	GR	Pts	Qualification or relegation
1	Royal Artillery Portsmouth	22	19	1	2	75	22	3.409	39	Promotion test matches
2	Warmley	22	19	0	3	108	15	7.200	38	Promotion test matches
3	West Herts (Note: Merged with Watford St Mary's to form Watford)	22	11	6	5	50	48	1.042	28	
4	Uxbridge	22	11	2	9	39	57	0.684	24	
5	St Albans	22	9	5	8	47	41	1.146	23	
6	Dartford	22	11	0	11	68	55	1.236	22	Left to join Kent League at end of season
7	Southall	22	8	2	12	49	61	0.803	18	
8	Chesham	22	8	2	12	38	48	0.792	18	
9	Old St.Stephen's (Note: Changed name to Shepherd's Bush at end of season)	22	7	2	13	47	66	0.712	16	
10	Wycombe Wanderers	22	7	2	13	37	55	0.673	16	
11	Maidenhead	22	4	4	14	27	81	0.333	12	
12	RETB Chatham	22	4	2	16	26	62	0.419	10	Left to join Kent League at end of season

Rules for classification: The system of using goal average to separate two teams tied on points was used until the 1976-77 season. The points system: 2 points for a win, 1 point for a draw and 0 points for losing.

== Promotion-relegation test matches ==
Unlike previous seasons in which individual test matches had been played between clubs, this season saw the bottom two clubs in Division One and the top two clubs in Division two play in a four-club round robin, with the top two retaining or earning a place in Division One. Both Division Two clubs were promoted after the matches, with Northfleet leaving the league after the season ended.

Pos	Team	Pld	W	D	L	GF	GA	GR	Pts	Promotion or relegation
1	Royal Artillery Portsmouth	4	3	1	0	8	4	2.000	7	Promoted
2	Warmley	4	2	1	1	14	7	2.000	5	Promoted
3	Northfleet	4	1	0	3	6	11	0.545	2	Relegated
4	Wolverton L&NWR	4	0	2	2	5	11	0.455	2	Relegated

Rules for classification: The system of using goal average to separate two teams tied on points was used until the 1976-77 season. The points system: 2 points for a win, 1 point for a draw and 0 points for losing.

== Football League elections ==
Only one Southern League club, Bristol City, applied for election to Division Two of the Football League. However, they were not elected. Although Darwen were initially voted out of the league, a decision was made to expand the League by four clubs, and they were readmitted, along with New Brighton Tower, Glossop North End and Barnsley.

Club	League	Votes
Lincoln City	Football League	21
Burslem Port Vale	Midland League	18
Loughborough Town	Football League	16
Darwen	Football League	16
New Brighton Tower	Lancashire League	
Nelson	Lancashire League	
Bristol City	Southern League	
