= Royal Ordnance Factories F.C. =

Former association football club in England

Royal Ordnance Factories
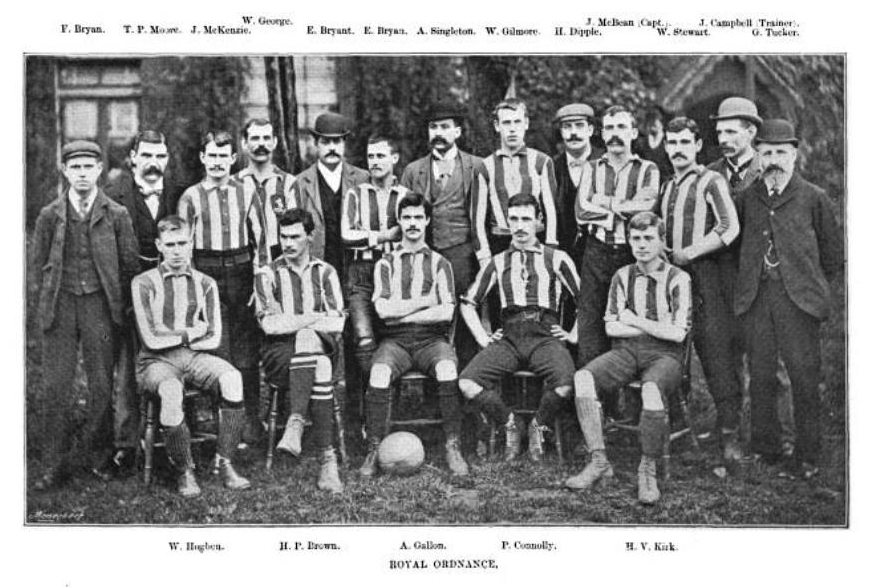
- 1894
- Full name: Royal Ordnance Factories Football Club
- Founded: 1893
- Dissolved: c. 1896
- Ground: Invicta Ground, Plumstead; Unknown ground, Maze Hill
- Capacity: Unknown
- League: Southern League
- 1895–96: 9th
Home colours

Royal Ordnance Factories Football Club were a football club from south east London, England, that existed in the late 19th century.

== History ==
In 1893, the former workers' team at the Royal Arsenal in Woolwich, Woolwich Arsenal FC, was by now a professional side and had joined the Football League. The workers at the Royal Arsenal, some of whom still played as amateurs for Woolwich Arsenal, proposed a new workers' team to fill the void, and so the same year founded Royal Ordnance Factories FC. Five amateurs from Woolwich Arsenal defected to the new side: Peter Connolly, William George, Jack McBean, Jimmy Meggs and J. McKenzie; (Note: McKenzie's first name is unknown.) two more, Bobby Buist and William Stewart joined them later. Additionally, one of Arsenal's founders, David Danskin was also associated with the side as an official and referee.

They opted to play in an all-blue kit, and at first played their home matches at the Invicta Ground in Plumstead, Royal Arsenal's old ground. In their first season (1893–94), the club entered the FA Amateur Cup, beating New Brompton before being knocked out 3–2 by Reading. The rest of their first season consisted of friendlies. That changed in 1894–95 when they became founder members of the Southern League. They finished seventh of nine in their first season, and had to play a test match in order to retain their divisional status. They played Old St Stephen's, winning 3–1.

That same year, Royal Ordnance Factories challenged their former colleagues Woolwich Arsenal in a local derby, on 25 April 1895; by now the side had moved to a new ground in Maze Hill near Greenwich. Ordnance won the match 1–0, which was halted 15 minutes before time owing to bad light. Later that year, on 7 September, Royal Ordnance Factories were the first to team to ever play Thames Ironworks FC (who would later become West Ham United) at Thames Ironworks' Hermit Road ground; the game ended 1–1.

At the end of the 1895–96 season they had finished ninth out of ten in the Southern League and again had to play a test match, this time losing to Sheppey United 4–2. Despite this they managed to retain their league status. In the FA Cup during those two seasons they went out both times to Millwall Athletic in the 4th qualifying round.

The club was beset with financial difficulties throughout its life, as well as other problems such as the death of Peter Connolly in 1895. They resigned from the Southern League in the 1896–97 season after only playing seven games. All of those games were lost with a total of 46 goals conceded. In October 1896, Royal Ordnance Factories played Southampton St. Mary's at their Antelope Ground, with the match ending 10–0. In goal for the Royal Ordnance factory was Herbert Williamson who had been the "Saints" goalkeeper in 1894–95. Their record was expunged,

The name was briefly resurrected over twenty years later with a similarly named club from the area, also known as Royal Ordnance Woolwich, that participated in the Kent League for two seasons after World War I. The club was resurrected again in the 1960s for a single season. The club eventually merged with Arsenal F.C. in 1969.

== Colours ==
The earliest known colours for the club are blue and white stripes; as a Southern League side, the club adopted blue shirts and white knicks.
