= 1896–97 Southern Football League =

The 1896–97 season was the third in the history of the Southern League. Southampton St.Mary's won the Division One championship. Millwall Athletic and Tottenham Hotspur applied for election to Football League. However, they were not elected so were allowed to play in the Southern League.

== Division One ==
Southern Football League Division One
- Season: 1896–97
- Champions: Southampton St.Mary's (1st title)
- Promoted: none
- Relegated: Royal Ordnance Factories (resigned)
- Matches: 110
- Goals: 429 (3.9 per match)

Division One featured seven teams from previous season and five new clubs: two promoted from Division Two and three newly elected members.

Teams promoted from Division Two:

- Wolverston L&NWR - champions, winners of testing matches
- Sheppey United - runners-up, winners of testing matches

Newly promoted teams:

- Northfleet - Kent League champions
- Gravesend United - Kent League members
- Tottenham Hotspur

Pos	Team	Pld	W	D	L	GF	GA	GAv	Pts	Relegation
1	Southampton St.Mary's (Note: Changed name to Southampton at end of season)	20	15	5	0	63	18	3.500	35	
2	Millwall Athletic	20	13	5	2	63	24	2.625	31	
3	Chatham Town	20	13	1	6	54	29	1.862	27	
4	Tottenham Hotspur	20	9	4	7	43	29	1.483	22	
5	Gravesend United	20	9	4	7	35	34	1.029	22	
6	Swindon Town	20	8	3	9	33	37	0.892	19	
7	Reading	20	8	3	9	31	49	0.633	19	
8	New Brompton	20	7	2	11	32	42	0.762	16	
9	Northfleet	20	5	4	11	24	46	0.522	14	Relegation test matches
10	Sheppey United	20	5	1	14	34	47	0.723	11	Relegation test matches
11	Wolverton L&NWR	20	2	0	18	17	74	0.230	4	Relegation test matches
12	Royal Ordnance Factories	7	1	4	2	11	5	2.200	6	Resigned from league after seven matches, record expunged

Rules for classification: The system of using goal average to separate two teams tied on points was used until the 1976-77 season. The points system: 2 points for a win, 1 point for a draw and 0 points for losing.

== Division Two ==
Southern Football League Division Two
- Season: 1896–97
- Champions: Dartford
- Promoted: none
- Relegated: Freemantle (resigned); 1st Scots Guards (resigned); 1st Coldstream Guards (resigned)
- Matches: 156
- Goals: 618 (3.96 per match)

Division Two featured five teams from previous season and eight new clubs, all of which were newly elected.

Newly promoted teams:

- Dartford - Kent League members
- RETB Chatham - Kent League members
- 1st Coldstream Guards
- Freemantle
- Southall
- Warmley
- West Herts
- Wycombe Wanderers

Pos	Team	Pld	W	D	L	GF	GA	GAv	Pts	Qualification or relegation
1	Dartford	24	16	4	4	83	19	4.368	36	Promotion test matches
2	RETB Chatham	24	11	9	4	49	37	1.324	31	Promotion test matches
3	Freemantle	24	12	4	8	58	40	1.450	28	Promotion test matches, left league at end of season (Note: Freemantle resigned at the end of the season from the Southern Football League, creating a vacancy filled by Royal Artillery Portsmouth in the next 1897-98 season)
4	Uxbridge	24	11	5	8	62	37	1.676	27	
5	Wycombe Wanderers	24	10	6	8	37	54	0.685	26	
6	Chesham	24	11	3	10	41	55	0.745	25	
7	Southall	24	9	6	9	55	52	1.058	24	
8	1st Scots Guards	24	9	6	9	49	50	0.980	24	Left league at end of season
9	Warmley	24	10	3	11	44	43	1.023	23	
10	West Herts	24	11	1	12	41	49	0.837	23	
11	Old St.Stephen's	24	5	7	12	36	52	0.692	17	
12	Maidenhead	24	4	8	12	33	64	0.516	16	
13	1st Coldstream Guards	24	3	6	15	30	66	0.455	12	Left league at end of season

Source: rsssf.com
Rules for classification: The system of using goal average to separate two teams tied on points was used until the 1976-77 season. The points system: 2 points for a win, 1 point for a draw and 0 points for losing.

== Promotion-relegation test matches ==
At the end of the season, test matches were held between the bottom three clubs in Division One and the top three clubs in Division Two. Third-placed Freemantle were the only Division Two club to win, but withdrew from the league at the end of season, meaning their defeated opponents Northfleet remained in Division One.

Division One clubs	v	Division Two clubs

Wolverton LNWR	2 – 0	Dartford

Sheppey United	2 – 1	RETB Chatham

Northfleet	0 – 3	Freemantle

== Football League elections ==
Only one Southern League club, Millwall Athletic, applied for election to Division Two of the Football League. However, they received only one vote and were not elected.

Club	League	Votes
Lincoln City	Football League	21
Burton Swifts	Football League	15
Luton Town	United League	13
Burslem Port Vale	Midland League	11
Burton Wanderers	Football League	9
Nelson	Lancashire League	7
Glossop North End	The Combination	5
Fairfield	Lancashire League	3
Crewe Alexandra	The Combination	2
Millwall Athletic	Southern League	1
