= 1894–95 Southern Football League =

The 1894–95 season was the first in the history of the Southern League. Sixteen clubs joined the new league, which was split into two divisions. Millwall Athletic won Division One without losing a match, and were invited to join the Football League but declined because of travelling.

== Division One ==
Southern Football League Division One
- Season: 1894–95
- Champions: Millwall Athletic
- Promoted: none
- Relegated: none
- Matches: 72
- Goals: 285 (3.96 per match)

Pos	Team	Pld	W	D	L	GF	GA	GR	Pts	Qualification
1	Millwall Athletic	16	12	4	0	68	19	3.579	28	
2	Luton Town	16	9	4	3	36	22	1.636	22	
3	Southampton St. Mary's	16	9	2	5	34	25	1.360	20	
4	Ilford	16	6	3	7	26	40	0.650	15	
5	Reading	16	6	2	8	33	38	0.868	14	
6	Chatham Town	16	4	5	7	22	25	0.880	13	
7	Royal Ordnance Factories	16	3	6	7	20	30	0.667	12	Relegation test matches
8	Clapton	16	5	1	10	22	38	0.579	11	Relegation test matches
9	Swindon Town	16	4	1	11	24	48	0.500	9	Relegation test matches

Source: The system of using goal average to separate two teams tied on points was used up until the 1976-77 season. The points system: 2 points for a win, 1 point for a draw and 0 points for losing.

== Division Two ==
Southern Football League Division Two
- Season: 1894–95
- Champions: New Brompton
- Promoted: New Brompton
- Relegated: none
- Matches: 42
- Goals: 184 (4.38 per match)

Pos	Team	Pld	W	D	L	GF	GA	GR	Pts	Qualification
1	New Brompton	12	11	0	1	57	10	5.700	22	Promotion test matches
2	Sheppey United	12	6	1	5	25	23	1.087	13	Promotion test matches
3	Old St.Stephen's	12	6	0	6	26	26	1.000	12	Promotion test matches
4	Uxbridge	12	4	3	5	14	20	0.700	11	
5	Bromley	12	4	1	7	23	30	0.767	9	
6	Chesham	12	3	3	6	20	42	0.476	9	
7	Maidenhead	12	2	4	6	19	33	0.576	8	

Source: rsssf.com
Rules for classification: The system of using goal average to separate two teams tied on points was used up until the 1976-77 season. The points system: 2 points for a win, 1 point for a draw and 0 points for losing.

== Promotion-relegation test matches ==
At the end of the season, the bottom three clubs in Division One played the top three clubs in Division Two in test matches to decide on promotion and relegation. Division Two champions New Brompton were the only lower division club to win, although their opponents, Swindon Town, were not relegated, with the First Division expanding to 10 clubs.

Division One clubs	v	Division Two clubs

Swindon Town	1 – 5	New Brompton

Clapton	5 – 1	Sheppey United

Royal Ordnance Factories	3 – 1	Old St.Stephen's
