= 1893–94 St. Mary's F.C. season =

English football club season

St. Mary's F.C.
1893–94 season
- Honorary President: Canon Basil Wilberforce
- Secretary: Cecil Knight
- Stadium: Antelope Ground
- FA Cup: Second Qualifying round
- Hampshire Senior Cup: Finalists
- Top goalscorer: League: N/A; All: Jack Dorkin (6)
- Highest home attendance: >7,000 vs Freemantle (3 February 1894) (Hampshire Senior Cup semi-final) (Played at The County Ground)
Home colours

The 1893–94 season was the ninth since the foundation of St. Mary's F.C. based in Southampton in southern England. For the third consecutive year, the club were eliminated in the second qualifying round of the FA Cup; they were also defeated in the final of the Hampshire Senior Cup.

== Summary of the season ==
Having embraced professionalism in the previous season, the club recruited two players from The Football League in the summer of 1893: Jack Angus from Ardwick and Harry Offer, who had previously been with Royal Arsenal. The season started well, with four consecutive victories in friendly matches, including a 9–2 victory over Christchurch (in which Angus scored four) on 22 September and a 7–0 victory over the Royal Engineers two weeks later.

In the FA Cup an easy victory over Uxbridge was followed by defeat at Reading. Two days after the cup defeat, St. Mary's entertained Bolton Wanderers with the Football League side demonstrating their superiority with an emphatic 5–0 victory. This was the only defeat before Christmas.

In the New Year, a series of injuries, including to full-back Ginger Price and captain George Carter, led to a fall off in form. In the Hampshire Senior Cup, the holders Freemantle were defeated at the second attempt in the semi-final (in which Angus was sent off) leading to the final, where St. Mary's lost to a team from the Royal Engineers. In the final, Price's replacement, Rowthorn, suffered serious internal injuries, thus ending his football career. Shortly afterwards, St. Mary's recruited a replacement full-back, when they signed Lachie Thomson from Stoke. Thomson was the first of several players to be recruited from Stoke; he would be joined by six of his former Stoke colleagues by October 1895.

Also injured in the final was long-term goalkeeper Ralph Ruffell whose playing career was ended by a dislocated knee-cap. Ruffell was the sole remaining player from the eleven who had played the club's inaugural match in November 1885.

St. Mary's gained some compensation for their failure in the Hampshire Senior Cup, when they won the Hampshire County Cricket Club Charity Cup. Charles Miller, who was still studying in the town, played in all three matches in this cup; these were his final competitive appearances before returning to his native Brazil, where he introduced football and became known as the "father" of Brazilian football.

During the 1893–94 season, the Saints arranged a match under "Well's Patent" lights, but it was called off due to bad weather; it would be another 60 years before Southampton played their first match under floodlights. At the end of the season, the Saints were able to report a "profit" of over £85 — gate receipts and subscriptions had produced income of £768, with expenses of £683 including wages of £221 and rent for the Antelope Ground of £42.

In June 1894, St. Mary's Church, who owned the freehold of the Antelope Ground, were short of funds and decided that the ground should be sold. They offered it to the Town Council for £5,000 but this was declined. There was a brief half-hearted campaign to persuade the Saints to purchase the freehold, but the club could not afford it but instead considered a permanent move to the County Ground. Ultimately, this all came to nothing and the Saints remained at the Antelope Ground for the start of the next, historic season, when they would play league football for the first time.

== FA Cup ==
As in the two previous seasons, St. Mary's exited the FA Cup in the second qualifying round. After a straightforward victory over Uxbridge in the first qualifying round, the Saints were drawn against Reading who had gone through at the Saints' expense in controversial circumstances two years earlier. The Saints were not able to gain revenge, however, and were defeated 2–1. Reading went on to defeat Swindon Town in the next qualifying round to enter the first round proper for the first time where they visited Preston North End, losing 18–0, with Frank Becton and Jimmy Ross each scoring six goals. This remains Reading's worst-ever defeat.

=== Results ===
Date	Round	Opponents	H / A	Result F – A	Scorers	Attendance
4 November 1893	1st Qualifying Round	Uxbridge	H	3 – 1	Taylor, Ward, Nicholls	
25 November 1893	2nd Qualifying Round	Reading	A	1 – 2	Own goal	

==== Legend ====
Win	Draw	Loss

== Hampshire Senior Cup ==
Having exited the FA Cup in November, St. Mary's only realistic hope for a significant trophy was in the Hampshire Senior Cup. After defeating Cowes in the first round, they were drawn against the holders, local rivals Freemantle in the semi-final. St. Mary's were looking to gain revenge for their controversial defeat in the 1893 final and the match attracted great interest in the town with the crowd at the County Ground being reported as "larger than for the final the previous year". St. Mary's were without full-back Ginger Price and captain George Carter, both of whom were injured with their places being filled by Rowthorn and "Banquo" Stride respectively.

The first match ended in a 1–1 draw so the teams met again three weeks later. Despite having Jack Angus sent off for an "over zealous" tackle (thus becoming the first St. Mary's player to be dismissed) and Freemantle having a shot hit the crossbar, St. Mary's won the replay 2–1 to set up the final with the Royal Engineers.

With Angus not being able to play, and Carter and Price still injured, the Saints fielded a weakened side in the final. Things got worse when Rowthorn was injured after only five minutes with serious internal injuries which ended his football career. Midway through the second half, the St. Mary's goalkeeper Ralph Ruffell suffered a dislocated kneecap, thus reducing St. Mary's to nine players. In the circumstances, to lose the final by only a single goal was a "creditable" result.

=== Results ===
Date	Round	Opponents	H / A	Result F – A	Scorers	Attendance
9 December 1893	1st	Cowes	H	2 – 0	Dorkin, Nicholls	
3 February 1894	Semi-final	Freemantle	N	1 – 1	Dorkin	>7,000
24 February 1894	Semi-final replay	Freemantle	N	2 – 1	Dorkin, Ward	
10 March 1894	Final	Royal Engineers, Aldershot	N	0 – 1		

== Hampshire County Cricket Club Charity Cup ==
=== Results ===
Date	Round	Opponents	H / A	Result F – A	Scorers	Attendance
18 April 1894	Semi-final	Lancashire Regiment	N	2 – 2	Dorkin, Offer	
21 April 1894	Semi-final replay	Lancashire Regiment	N	3 – 0	Angus, Dorkin, Offer	
23 April 1894	Final	15 Company, Royal Artillery	N	5 – 0	Offer (2), Dorkin, Furby, Angus	

== Portsmouth & District Cup ==
=== Results ===
Date	Round	Opponents	H / A	Result F – A	Scorers	Attendance
23 December 1893	Semi-final	15 Company, Royal Artillery	H	3 – 2	Angus (2), Offer	
17 March 1894	Final	Freemantle	N	0 – 2		

== Friendly matches ==
In the absence of a local league structure, St. Mary's continued to arrange friendly matches against military sides and club sides from around the country. Three teams from The Football League visited the Antelope Ground: Bolton Wanderers won 5–0 on 23 November and Stoke won 3–2 in the final match of the season, on 25 April 1894. On 13 January, the Saints entertained, and defeated, Woolwich Arsenal for the third consecutive year with Angus and Nineham both scoring twice, with the Gunners only able to score twice in reply. Other large victories included those over Christchurch (9–2), Royal Engineers (7–0) and "Cameronians" (6–1).

In all, St. Mary's played 23 friendlies, with 13 wins, four draws and six defeats.

== Player statistics ==
The players who appeared in any of the four Cup tournaments were as follows. This list does not include players who only played in friendly matches.

Position	Nationality	Name	FA Cup apps	FA Cup goals	Hampshire Cup apps	Hampshire Cup goals	Other Cups apps	Other Cups goals	Total apps	Total goals
FW	Scotland	Jack Angus	2	0	3	0	4	4	9	4
GK	England	Jack Barrett	0	0	0	0	4	0	4	0
FB	England	George Carter	2	0	1	0	1	0	4	0
FW	England	Jack Dorkin	2	0	4	3	5	3	11	6
HB	England	Bill Furby	0	0	0	0	3	1	3	1
FW	England	Bob Kiddle	1	0	0	0	2	0	3	0
HB	England	George Marshall	2	0	4	0	4	0	10	0
HB	Not known	Matthew Marshall	0	0	0	0	1	0	1	0
FW	Brazil	Charles Miller	0	0	0	0	3	0	3	0
FW	England	Ernie Nicholls	2	1	2	1	1	0	5	2
FW	England	Arthur Nineham	1	0	4	0	5	0	10	0
FW	England	Harry Offer	2	0	3	0	5	5	10	5
FB	Not known	T. Price	1	0	1	0	1	0	3	0
FB	Not known	Rowthorn	0	0	3	0	0	0	3	0
GK	England	Ralph Ruffell	2	0	4	0	1	0	7	0
HB	England	William Stride	0	0	3	0	1	0	4	0
FB	England	Ernie Taylor	1	1	4	0	4	0	9	1
FB	England	Lachie Thomson	0	0	0	0	3	0	3	0
HB	Not known	George Verney	2	0	4	0	5	0	11	0
FW	England	Herbert Ward	2	1	4	1	2	0	8	2

=== Key ===
- GK — Goalkeeper
- FB — Full back
- HB — Half-back
- FW — Forward

== Transfers ==
=== In ===
Date	Position	Name	From
Summer 1893	FW	Jack Angus	Ardwick
March 1894	GK	Jack Barrett	Local football
March 1894	HB	Bill Furby	Local football
Summer 1893	FW	Harry Offer	Swindon Town
April 1894	FW	Lachie Thomson	Stoke
March 1894	FW	Herbert Ward	Local football

=== Departures ===
Date	Position	Name	To
Summer 1893	FW	F. A. Delamotte	Retired
Summer 1893	FW	Jack Dollin	Freemantle
Summer 1893	FW	Arthur Farwell	Retired
January 1894	FB	Ginger Price	Retired, injured
March 1894	GK	Ralph Ruffell	Retired, injured

== Bibliography ==
- Chalk, Gary; Holley, Duncan (1987). Saints – A complete record. Breedon Books. ISBN 0-907969-22-4.
- Collett, Mike (2003). The Complete Record of the FA Cup. Sports Books. ISBN 1-899807-19-5.
- Holley, Duncan; Chalk, Gary (1992). The Alphabet of the Saints. ACL & Polar Publishing. ISBN 0-9514862-3-3.
- Juson, Dave; Bull, David (2001). Full-Time at The Dell. Hagiology Publishing. ISBN 0-9534474-2-1.
