= 1892–93 St. Mary's F.C. season =

English football club season

St. Mary's F.C.
1892–93 season
- Honorary President: Canon Basil Wilberforce
- Secretary: John Hendin / Cecil Knight
- Stadium: Antelope Ground
- FA Cup: Second Qualifying round
- Hampshire Senior Cup: Finalists
- Top goalscorer: League: N/A; All: Bob Kiddle / Jack Dollin (3)
- Highest home attendance: 7,000 vs Freemantle (11 March 1893) (Hampshire Senior Cup final) (Played at The County Ground)
Home colours

The 1892–93 season was the eighth since the foundation of St. Mary's F.C. based in Southampton in southern England. It was the second year that the club competed in the qualifying rounds of the FA Cup and the first season that the club embraced professionalism with several players being signed on professional terms. This policy was not to prove a great success initially as the club were not only defeated in the second qualifying round of the FA Cup but also suffered their first-ever defeat in a final of a Hampshire F.A. cup competition.

== Summary of the season ==
At the start of the season, the club's administration was in disarray as the secretary, Mr. J. Hendin was seriously ill and was convalescing in Brighton. As a result, by the end of August no fixture list had been printed and rumours were circulating in the local press that the club was £50 in debt. Several of the club's best players were unavailable with F. A. Delamotte's work as a surveyor taking him to Derby and Ernie Nicholls also leaving the area; Arthur Farwell's employment with Edwin Jones made him unavailable to play on Saturday afternoons.

To bolster the side, the committee attempted to recruit George Ridges on professional terms from local rivals, Freemantle, but Ridges refused the offer and remained with the "Magpies" as an amateur. The "Saints" then turned their attentions to another Freemantle player, Jack Dollin, who was paid £1 a week and found a job, thus becoming the club's first professional player, although the club kept his professional status a secret for many years, for fear of being ostracised by other clubs.

The club's opening match was a friendly played at The County Ground against a team from the South Staffordshire Regiment on 17 September 1892. The appearance of the players was described as "shambolic" with the players turning out in a variety of shirts, with two players in white, three in various coloured shirts and only half the side wearing the correct strip of alternate cherry red squares. The players' appearance was reflected in their performance, with the team suffering a 4–0 defeat. The next three matches were also lost and there was a "palpable sense of relief" in the town when the Saints defeated Newbury in the first qualifying round of the FA Cup on 15 October. Two weeks later, however, the side were easily defeated in the next round of the cup, going down 4–0 to Maidenhead; this was the Saints first defeat in a major cup match.

After the FA Cup defeat, the St. Mary's committee attempted to sign F.W. Janes, who had scored a hat-trick for Maidenhead, but the signing was overturned by the Football Association. In an attempt to strengthen the side, the committee then advertised for players in the "athletic press"; the first major new signing was Jack Dorkin, who was "bought out" of his service with the Royal Engineers based at Chatham in Kent. As with Jack Dollin, his status was rather ambiguous initially with the club maintaining that he should be "reckoned as an amateur player", although he was signed too late to be able to play in the Hampshire Senior Cup.

In the Hampshire Senior Cup, the team reached the finals where they were eliminated by local rivals, Freemantle in controversial circumstances (see below).

Having suffered two cup defeats (never having lost a major cup match before), St. Mary's played out the season with friendly matches. Most notable of these was the penultimate match of the season, played at the County Ground on 26 April 1893 against Stoke who were founder members of The Football League and were seventh in the First Division. St. Mary's were without captain George Carter but were able to call on the services of 18-year-old Charles Miller. Miller had made his debut for St. Mary's a year earlier, but was later to achieve fame as the "father of Brazilian football". Another large crowd, "packed around the ropes like peas in a pod (with) the grandstand full to overflowing" witnessed a comprehensive defeat, with Stoke winning 8–0 as the Saints were "outplayed fairly and squarely on every point". Despite the defeat, the spectators "thoroughly enjoyed the exhibition, and it is hoped that we shall witness more matches of a similar character".

The size of the defeat in this match served to bring home the need for St. Mary's to look outside the local area for players; within little over a year, the Saints had signed three of the Stoke team (forward Charles Baker and half-backs Alf Littlehales and Lachie Thomson) in readiness for their first season in the Southern League.

Towards the end of the season, St. Mary's recruited their first player from a Football League club when former Everton player Ernie Taylor joined the club. Taylor was employed as a cashier with the American Shipping Company in Liverpool, but was transferred to their Southampton office. Taylor was engaged by St. Mary's as an amateur and made his competitive debut on 15 April 1893 in the Hampshire County Cricket Club Charity Cup.

== FA Cup ==
The Saints entered the FA Cup in the first qualifying round when they defeated Newbury 4–1 (with a hat-trick from Bob Kiddle) at the Antelope Ground.

In the second qualifying round they played Maidenhead at the Antelope Ground on 29 October 1892. Although the team was boosted by Ernie Nicholls (who had returned from his temporary absence) and George Ridges (on loan from Freemantle), they suffered a 4–0 defeat. Apart from the Hampshire County Cricket Club Charity Cup the previous April, this was the Saints first defeat in a cup match. Three of Maidenhead's goals were scored by F.W. Janes. St. Mary's promptly signed Janes on professional terms, but the signing was revoked by the Football Association, who judged that he was "in no fit condition to realise what he was doing when he signed for Southampton", presumably because he had consumed too much alcohol at the time of signing.

=== Results ===
| Date | Round | Opponents | H / A | Result F – A | Scorers | Attendance |
|---|---|---|---|---|---|---|
| 15 October 1892 | 1st Qualifying Round | Newbury | H | 4 – 1 | Kiddle (3), Mulford | |
| 29 October 1892 | 2nd Qualifying Round | Maidenhead | H | 0 – 4 | | |

==== Legend ====
| Win | Draw | Loss |

== Hampshire Senior Cup ==
St. Mary's also competed in the Hampshire Senior Cup in 1892–93, hoping to claim a third consecutive victory. After 2–0 wins over the Royal Engineers and an amateur side representing Portsmouth, they reached the final against local rivals Freemantle.

With Dorkin unavailable, Southampton were able to call on the services of Delamotte, who had returned to the town, and Farwell, who had been allowed to take the afternoon off work. The final, played at the County Ground on 11 March, generated great excitement in the town and produced a crowd estimated at 7,000 and gate receipts of £122. The Bournemouth Guardian reported: "the attendance completely upset all ideas as to the accommodation that would be required, and the magnificent spectacle of between 6,000 and 7,000 excited individuals massed together round the field of play ... was one that Hampshire and indeed none of the counties south of the Thames and this side of London has ever witnessed at an Association football match."

Freemantle led 1–0 at half-time before Jack Dollin equalised. With the score 1–1 and only a few minutes left to play, a Freemantle forward, Horton, was about to score past Ralph Ruffell in the Saints' goal when he was tripped by William Stride. Despite protests from St. Mary's, the referee awarded a penalty to Freemantle, which was converted by Shirley Hawkins, giving Freemantle their first trophy. After the match, captain George Carter protested to the referee that the foul had been committed outside the penalty area, saying that he could point out the exact spot where the offence occurred. The referee, Mr. Royston Bourke, replied: "In that case, I suggest you have a tombstone erected over it."

St. Mary's initially lodged a formal protest but this was withdrawn before the Hampshire F.A. could convene to hear it.

=== Results ===
| Date | Round | Opponents | H / A | Result F – A | Scorers | Attendance |
|---|---|---|---|---|---|---|
| 17 December 1892 | 3rd | Royal Engineers, Aldershot | H | 2 – 0 | Verney, Dollin | |
| 4 February 1893 | Semi-final | Portsmouth^{a} | N | 2 – 0 | Nicholls, Dollin | |
| 11 March 1893 | Final | Freemantle | N | 1 – 2 | Dollin | 7,000 |

== Hampshire County Cricket Club Charity Cup ==
=== Results ===
| Date | Round | Opponents | H / A | Result F – A | Scorers | Attendance |
|---|---|---|---|---|---|---|
| 15 April 1893 | Semi-final | Cowes | N | 0 – 0 | | |
| 22 April 1893 | Semi-final replay | Cowes | N | 3 – 1 | Marshall, Dorkin, Nicholls | |

The 1892–93 final of this competition was never played.

== Friendly matches ==
During the 1892–93 season, St. Mary's played 27 friendly matches of which 13 were won, with five draws and nine defeats. Other than the match against Stoke, the opponents were either military sides or from clubs in southern England. Notable among these was the visit of Woolwich Arsenal, the south's only "openly professional" side, who were defeated 2–0. The most comprehensive victories were against teams from the Royal Artillery (won 7–0) and King's Own Rifles (won 7–1).

== Player statistics ==
The players who appeared in any of the three Cup tournaments were as follows. This list does not include players who only played in friendly matches.

| Position | Nationality | Name | FA Cup apps | FA Cup goals | Hampshire Cup apps | Hampshire Cup goals | Other Cups apps | Other Cups goals | Total apps | Total goals |
|---|---|---|---|---|---|---|---|---|---|---|
| HB | England | Bob Bailey ^{b} | 2 | 0 | 0 | 0 | 0 | 0 | 2 | 0 |
| GK | England | Victor Barton | 0 | 0 | 1 | 0 | 0 | 0 | 1 | 0 |
| GK | Not known | Boyd | 0 | 0 | 1 | 0 | 0 | 0 | 1 | 0 |
| FB | England | George Carter | 2 | 0 | 3 | 0 | 2 | 0 | 7 | 0 |
| FW | England | F. A. Delamotte | 0 | 0 | 3 | 0 | 0 | 0 | 3 | 0 |
| FW | England | Jack Dollin | 2 | 0 | 3 | 3 | 1 | 0 | 6 | 3 |
| FW | England | Jack Dorkin | 0 | 0 | 0 | 0 | 2 | 1 | 2 | 1 |
| FW | England | Arthur Farwell | 0 | 0 | 3 | 0 | 1 | 0 | 4 | 0 |
| FW | Not known | R. Gilchrist ^{c} | 2 | 0 | 0 | 0 | 0 | 0 | 2 | 0 |
| FW | England | Bob Kiddle | 2 | 3 | 0 | 0 | 1 | 0 | 3 | 3 |
| HB | England | George Marshall | 2 | 0 | 3 | 0 | 2 | 1 | 7 | 1 |
| FW | Brazil | Charles Miller | 0 | 0 | 0 | 0 | 1 | 0 | 1 | 0 |
| FW | England | Arthur Mulford | 1 | 1 | 1 | 0 | 0 | 0 | 2 | 1 |
| FW | England | Ernie Nicholls | 1 | 0 | 3 | 1 | 2 | 1 | 6 | 2 |
| FW | England | Arthur Nineham | 0 | 0 | 2 | 0 | 2 | 0 | 4 | 0 |
| FW | Not known | W. S. Peck ^{d} | 1 | 0 | 0 | 0 | 0 | 0 | 1 | 0 |
| FB | Not known | T. Price | 0 | 0 | 3 | 0 | 0 | 0 | 3 | 0 |
| FW | England | George Ridges | 1 | 0 | 0 | 0 | 0 | 0 | 1 | 0 |
| GK | England | Ralph Ruffell | 2 | 0 | 1 | 0 | 2 | 0 | 5 | 0 |
| HB | England | William Stride | 2 | 0 | 3 | 0 | 2 | 0 | 7 | 0 |
| FB | England | Ernie Taylor | 0 | 0 | 0 | 0 | 2 | 0 | 2 | 0 |
| HB | Not known | George Verney | 2 | 0 | 3 | 1 | 2 | 0 | 7 | 1 |

=== Key ===
- GK — Goalkeeper
- FB — Full back
- HB — Half-back
- FW — Forward

== Notes ==
- ^a The Portsmouth team was an amateur side not connected with the present-day Portsmouth F.C., who were not founded until 1898.
- ^b Robert "Bob" Bailey first appeared in a St. Mary's team at centre-half in a friendly at Newbury on 1 October 1892; his performance in that match was described as "useful" and as "truly (warranting) his selection for a red and white shirt". He made his competitive debut in the FA Cup First Qualifying Round match (also against Newbury) and retained it for the second qualifying round match against Maidenhead. He left the Southampton area a few months later.
- ^c R. Gilchrist played for St. Mary's from September to November 1892, during which time he played in the two FA Cup qualifying round matches. He failed to settle and left the club after the FA Cup exit.
- ^d W. S. Peck first appeared in a St. Mary's team at the start of the 1892–93 season. He played in the first seven games, including the FA Cup match against Newbury. His last appearance came in a 5–0 defeat in a friendly match against Swindon Town on 5 November 1892, after which he "disappeared" from the records.

== Bibliography ==
- Bull, David; Brunskell, Bob (2000). Match of the Millennium. Hagiology Publishing. ISBN 0-9534474-1-3.
- Chalk, Gary; Holley, Duncan (1987). Saints – A complete record. Breedon Books. ISBN 0-907969-22-4.
- Holley, Duncan; Chalk, Gary (1992). The Alphabet of the Saints. ACL & Polar Publishing. ISBN 0-9514862-3-3.
- Juson, Dave; Bull, David (2001). Full-Time at The Dell. Hagiology Publishing. ISBN 0-9534474-2-1.
