= 1891–92 St. Mary's F.C. season =

English football club season

St. Mary's F.C.
1891–92 season
- Honorary President: Canon Basil Wilberforce
- Secretary: John Hendin
- Stadium: Antelope Ground
- FA Cup: Second Qualifying round
- Hampshire Senior Cup: Winners
- Top goalscorer: League: N/A; All: Ernie Nicholls (6)
- Highest home attendance: 4,000 vs Reading (24 October 1891) (FA Cup)
Home colours

The 1891–92 season was the seventh since the foundation of St. Mary's F.C. based in Southampton in southern England. For the first six years, the club had been restricted at first to friendly matches and then in cup tournaments organised by the Hampshire Football Association. In 1891, the team (known as the "Saints") entered a national competition for the first time, when it competed in the qualifying rounds of the F.A. Cup.

== Summary of the season ==
The club had entered the Hampshire Junior Cup in its inaugural year, 1887–88, winning it for three consecutive years, thus retaining the trophy. In 1890–91, they had moved up to the Hampshire Senior Cup, which they had also won, with a victory over a team from the Royal Engineers based at Aldershot.

In May 1891, at their Annual General Meeting, the club's president, Dr. Russell Bencraft announced that the club had a membership of 400 and a bank balance of over £100. As a consequence of their success in local tournaments, the club were "going further afield" and had entered the "English Cup". The club "had no expectation of doing much, but they would be satisfied if they got through to the first round, and some day he hoped they would do even more".

At the A.G.M., it was agreed that the club should provide the players with their kit but, as this would be in breach of the Football Association's rules, the club would "loan" the players the cost. This was agree at 12s (60p) for a pair of boots, 7s (35p) for a shirt and 4s 2d (21p) for a pair of "knickers". The players would still be required to wash and repair their own kit.

Since 1889, the club's home ground had been the Antelope Ground in St. Mary's Road, which they rented from St. Mary's Church.

In the FA Cup, St. Mary's reached the second qualifying round where they defeated Reading 7–0 before the result was overturned following an appeal by Reading. The club retained the Hampshire Senior Cup for the second year but experienced their first defeat in a cup tournament in the Hampshire County Cricket Club Charity Cup, losing 3–1 to the Royal Engineers.

== FA Cup ==
The club's first match in the FA Cup was at Warmley, near Bristol. The match was refereed by Mr. J. Lewis, who had helped found Blackburn Rovers, the FA Cup holders and would later referee three FA Cup finals and the Gold Medal match at the 1920 Olympic Games. (The "Saints" would meet Mr. Lewis again in controversial circumstances in the 1898 FA Cup Semi-final.) The match at Warmley passed without incident with Ernie Nicholls scoring the club's first goal in the FA Cup as St. Mary's progressed to the second qualifying round.

The draw for the next round was a home match against Reading to be played on 24 October 1891. Two weeks before the tie at the Antelope Ground, the Saints arranged a friendly against the 93rd Argyll and Sutherland Highlanders, after which two members of the Highlanders side, Pte. Jock Fleming and Sgt. Sandy McMillan, were signed by the Saints.

For the first FA Cup match to be staged in Southampton, the St. Mary's committee "pulled out all the stops" to make sure that the Antelope Ground met the standards expected of a venue for the country's top football tournament, although the local press complained of the poor facilities, not having a covered press box, and there were problems with the pitch markings. The crowd (estimated at 4,000) watched the match from behind a rope around the perimeter of the pitch. The walls and banks around the ground were crowded with spectators trying to get a better view, as were the windows of neighbouring houses.

Delamotte opened the scoring from the Saints' first attack before Fleming's aggressive style of play earned him a hat-trick en route to a 7–0 victory. The report in the local press said that "it was manifest to all observers that the Saints were superior to their opponents and outplayed them on every point". The Saints "were helped by two new members from the 93rd Highlanders, but I honestly believe they would have won easily with their ordinary team". The reporter for the Bournemouth Guardian described the match as "about the best game I ever saw the Saints play".

At the reception after the match, the Reading secretary (Mr. H. Walker) asked for, and received, an advance of £3 on the share of the gate money. With this he immediately sent a telegram of protest accompanied by the necessary fee of 2 guineas to the Football Association claiming that the Saints had fielded illegally registered players in Fleming and McMillan. Rule 5 of the Rules of The Challenge Cup Competition stated that "each individual must have been a recognised playing member of the club ... at least 28 days before the match".

The appeal was heard by the F.A. on the Wednesday after the match when St. Mary's were represented by Dr. Bencraft and the secretary, Mr. J. Hendin. Although the F.A. agreed that St. Mary's "had acted in perfect good faith in the matter" they had not complied with the requirements of Rule 5 and were thus expelled from the competition. After the appeal hearing, Mr. Hendin sent a telegram from London to The Southampton Times newspaper which said: "Poor old Saints. Disqualified. Hendin."

Following the elimination from the cup, Fleming and McMillan both left the club; Fleming went on to play in The Football League with Aston Villa whereas McMillan was posted to India where he died within a year of enteric fever.

Local reaction to the F.A.'s decision claimed that an injustice had been done: "A thunderbolt has fallen in the middle of their camp. innocent of wilful intent, they are punished severely, and added to this, is the feeling that Reading acted in anything but a sportsmanlike manner in this affair".

=== Results ===
Date	Round	Opponents	H / A	Result F – A	Scorers	Attendance
3 October 1891	1st Qualifying Round	Warmley	A	4 – 1	Nicholls (2), Carter, Delamotte	
24 October 1891	2nd Qualifying Round	Reading	H	7 – 0	Fleming (3), Verney, Nicholls, Delamotte, Own goal	4,000

==== Legend ====
Win	Draw	Loss

== Hampshire Senior Cup ==
Date	Round	Opponents	H / A	Result F – A	Scorers	Attendance
20 February 1892	Semi-final	Bournemouth	N	2 – 0	Deacon, Farwell	
12 March 1892	Final	Medical Staff	N	5 – 0	Nicholls (2), Carter, Delamotte, Farwell	

== Hampshire County Cricket Club Charity Cup ==
Date	Round	Opponents	H / A	Result F – A	Scorers	Attendance
23 April 1892	Final	Royal Engineers (Aldershot)	N	1 – 3	Nicholls	

== Friendly matches ==
In addition to the matches in the various cup tournaments, St. Mary's organised several friendly matches against teams from around southern England, including matches against military sides, such as the 93rd Argyll and Sutherland Highlanders (lost 2–0) and twice against the South Staffordshire Regiment (lost 6–1 and 2–0). Amongst the club sides, St.Mary's played Woolwich Arsenal; the first-ever meeting between the two clubs (on 27 February 1892) resulted in a 6–2 victory for the "Gunners".

On 18 April 1892, St. Mary's played their final friendly of the season at the County Ground against an army select side from the Aldershot Division. For this match, the Saints gave a debut to Charles Miller, a 17-year-old from Brazil who was a schoolboy at Banister Court School. Miller, who opened the scoring as the Saints won 3–1, thus became not only the first Brazilian to play for Southampton, but almost certainly the first Brazilian to play in Europe. Two days later, Miller played for the Corinthians against the Hampshire F.A. Following his return to Brazil in 1894, Miller helped found the São Paulo Athletic Club (SPAC) and the Liga Paulista, the first football league in Brazil, thus becoming the father of football in Brazil.

Of the 19 friendly matches known, only five were victories, with six draws and eight defeats.

== Player statistics ==
The players who appeared in any of the three Cup tournaments were as follows. This list does not include players, such as Charles Miller, who only played in friendly matches.

Position	Nationality	Name	FA Cup apps	FA Cup goals	Hampshire Cup apps	Hampshire Cup goals	Other Cups apps	Other Cups goals	Total apps	Total goals
FB	England	George Carter	2	1	2	1	0	0	4	2
HB	Not known	Charles Deacon	0	0	2	1	1	0	3	1
FW	Not known	Freeman Delamotte	2	2	2	1	0	0	4	3
FW	England	Francis Ellaby ^{a}	0	0	0	0	1	0	1	0
FW	England	Arthur Farwell	2	0	2	2	1	0	5	2
FW	Scotland	Jock Fleming	1	3	0	0	0	0	1	3
FB	Wales	David Hamer	0	0	0	0	1	0	1	0
FW	England	Bob Kiddle	2	0	2	0	1	0	5	0
FB	England	George Marshall	2	0	2	0	1	0	5	0
HB	Scotland	Sandy McMillan	1	0	0	0	0	0	1	0
HB	Not known	Bill Measures	1	0	0	0	0	0	1	0
FW	England	Arthur Mulford	1	0	2	0	0	0	3	0
FW	England	Ernie Nicholls	2	3	2	2	1	1	5	6
FW	Not known	Richard Richardson ^{b}	0	0	0	0	1	0	1	0
GK	England	Ralph Ruffell	2	0	2	0	1	0	5	0
HB	England	William Stride	2	0	2	0	1	0	5	0
HB	Not known	George Verney	2	1	2	0	1	0	5	1

=== Key ===
- GK — Goalkeeper
- FB — Full back
- HB — Half-back
- FW — Forward

=== Notes ===
- ^a Francis Norbury Ellaby (1873–1949) was a keen local sportsman, who also played rugby for the Trojans. A regular in Saints' reserves, he only made one first team appearance. He died in Calgary, Canada in 1949. His elder brother, Christopher George Ellaby (1859–1931), was headteacher at Bannister Court School, Southampton and the son of Revd. George Watts Ellaby (1823–1874), founder of the school. Christopher Ellaby introduced Charles Miller to football.
- ^b Richard Lewis Richardson (1869–1962) made only one appearance for the first team, but captained the reserve team from 1894 to 1896. He was an organist and music teacher by profession.

== Bibliography ==
- Bull, David; Brunskell, Bob (2000). Match of the Millennium. Hagiology Publishing. ISBN 0-9534474-1-3.
- Cavallini, Rob (2007). Play Up Corinth – A History of the Corinthian Football Club. Tempus Publishing. ISBN 0-7524-4479-4.
- Chalk, Gary; Holley, Duncan (1987). Saints – A complete record. Breedon Books. ISBN 0-907969-22-4.
- Chalk, Gary; Holley, Duncan; Bull, David (2013). All the Saints: A Complete Players' Who's Who of Southampton FC. Southampton: Hagiology Publishing. ISBN 978-0-9926-8640-6.
- Hamilton, Aidan (1998). An Entirely Different Game, The British Influence on Brazilian Football. Mainstream Publishing. ISBN 1-84018-041-2.
- Holley, Duncan; Chalk, Gary (1992). The Alphabet of the Saints. ACL & Polar Publishing. ISBN 0-9514862-3-3.
- Juson, Dave; Bull, David (2001). Full-Time at The Dell. Hagiology Publishing. ISBN 0-9534474-2-1.
