= 1890–91 St. Mary's F.C. season =

English football club season

St. Mary's F.C.
1890–91 season
- Honorary President: Canon Basil Wilberforce
- Secretary: John Hendin
- Ground: Antelope Ground
- Hampshire Senior Cup: Winners
- Top goalscorer: League: N/A; All: Ernie Nicholls (5)
- Highest home attendance: 4,000 – 5,000 (Hampshire Senior Cup final at the County Ground)
Home colours

1890–91 was the sixth season for St. Mary's Football Club (St. Mary's F.C.) based in Southampton in southern England. Having won the Hampshire Junior Cup outright in the previous season, the club entered the Hampshire Senior Cup, winning it at the first attempt.

== Summary of the season ==
St. Mary's continued to play their home grounds at the Antelope Ground in St. Mary's Road and to wear a strip of cherry red quarters, although the shorts were now blue rather than white. The club continued to dominate football in the town of Southampton, with Freemantle, outside the town boundary until 1895, the only other substantial club in the locality.

By the end of the season, St. Mary's had won not only the Hampshire Senior Cup, but also the Charity Cup put up by Hampshire County Cricket Club. They were also able to widen the circle of friendly matches to include stronger military and touring sides. The season ended with a club membership in excess of 400 and a bank balance of £100, double that at the start of the season.

== Personnel ==
Although he continued to play, F. A. Delamotte stood down as club secretary and was replaced by John Hendin, with Harry Johns being appointed treasurer. Canon Basil Wilberforce remained as Honorary President although Dr. Russell Bencraft, the senior committee member, was responsible for the running of the club. There were two new members of the playing staff; George Marshall and Ernie Nicholls, both of whom would remain with the club for several years. The only player remaining from the eleven who played in the inaugural match in November 1885 was regular goalkeeper Ralph Ruffell although Arthur Fry made a brief return, making one cup appearance in goal in the absence of Ruffell. Apart from this change, the same eleven players appeared in all five cup matches played during the 1890–91 season.

Although there is no record of St. Mary's having any full-time professional players, they were able to attract the best players from the area. William Pickford, the secretary of the Hampshire F.A. (and later the President of the Football Association) writing some years later said: "It may or may not be that there were "inducements", though without doubt the honour of playing with a brilliantly successful side was itself no inconsiderable one".

== Hampshire Senior Cup ==
Having won the Hampshire Junior Cup outright in the previous season, St. Mary's now turned their attention to the Hampshire Senior Cup. Their chances of success at a senior level were not rated very highly as the Hampshire Independent reported:

When the Senior ties commenced there was a very diverse feeling abroad as to the Saints' chances of getting a look in at the final; and some whose digestion had interfered with their judgement predicted that, although they had pulled off the junior honour, they would soon go under when pitted against the senior clubs of the county.

They were given a bye into the second round, where they met Geneva Cross, a team derived from staff at the Royal Victoria Hospital at Netley, who were easily defeated, 5–0. The match was played at the Antelope Ground in very muddy conditions, with the frozen pitch being softened by rain; the mud was reported to be "ankle deep at the Infirmary End".

A month later, St. Mary's met Banister Court in the semi-final; Banister Court were a school team composed mainly of teachers, who were renowned for their "pretty football". Amongst the pupils at Banister Court was the 16-year-old Charles Miller, who would go on to become the "father of Brazilian football", although he was deemed "too light" to play against St. Mary's burly full-backs. Despite the efforts of W. P. Cole in the Banister Court goal, who was reported to "throw the ball out like an expert labourer, with pints of beer in him, excavating a trench", St. Mary's won the match 3–0 to set up the final against the holders, the Royal Engineers from Aldershot Garrison on 14 March 1891.

As the holders, the Engineers were favourites to take the trophy for a third consecutive season. Playing at the County Ground in front of a record crowd estimated at between 4,000 and 5,000, who paid entrance fees totalling £63, St. Mary's took the lead after 20 minutes, through Ernie Nicholls who produced "a stinging shot which no goalkeeper could have saved" although the Engineers were level by half-time, following a slip by the Saints' captain, George Carter. In the second half, goals from Frank Bromley ("a cheer rent the air that might have been heard more than a mile away") and Bob Kiddle ("the delight of the Southampton people knew no bounds") gave St. Mary's the victory, thus remaining undefeated in four seasons of Hampshire cup football. The Southampton Times commented that "Saints never played a better game"; "once more, they had walked smiling through their opponents".

Writing in the Bournemouth Guardian, "Offside" considered the St. Mary's triumph as

almost the only event of any notion in the local football world ... It was a victory highly creditable to the Southampton Club, for no other team in the County could have tackled the Engineers with the confidence that the Saints displayed.

After the match, the two sides went to Gidden's Restaurant where the Saints entertained the Engineers. During the after-dinner speeches, Dr. Russell Bencraft announced that the club "might enter for the English Cup, just for the sake of competing, as (he) felt sure they could hold their own against such teams as Swindon and Reading etc. and it would be a feather in their caps to get through a round or two".

=== Results ===
Date	Round	Opponents	H / A	Result F – A	Scorers	Attendance (estimated)
24 January 1891	2nd	Geneva Cross	H	5 – 0	Bromley, Farwell, Kiddle, Nicholls, Verney	
24 February 1891	Semi-final	Bannister Court	N	3 – 0	Bromley, Farwell, Nicholls	
14 March 1891	Final	Royal Engineers, Aldershot	N	3 – 1	Nicholls, Bromley, Kiddle	4,000 – 5,000

==== Legend ====
Win	Draw	Loss

== Hampshire County Cricket Club Charity Cup ==
=== Results ===
Date	Round	Opponents	H / A	Result F – A	Scorers	Attendance (estimated)
18 April 1891	Semi-final	Bournemouth	N	2 – 2^{a}	Farwell, Nicholls	
24 April 1891	Final	Royal Engineers, Aldershot	N	1 – 0	Nicholls	

== Friendly matches ==
St. Mary's continued to play most of their football in friendly matches, widening the circle to include stronger military and touring sides.

=== Results ===
The results of the friendly matches that are known were as follows:

Date	Opponents	H / A	Result F – A	Scorers
20 September 1890	London Caledonians	H	1 – 3	Farwell
4 October 1890	Freemantle	H	4 – 0	Bromley, Deacon, Delamotte, Farwell
11 October 1890	Bournemouth	A	1 – 0	Verney
18 October 1890	Geneva Cross	A	3 – 3	Bromley (2), Farwell
23 October 1890	Winchester City	A	6 – 0	Nicholls (3), Delamotte (2), Sims
25 October 1890	Cowes	A	3 – 1	Bromley, Delamotte, Kiddle
1 November 1890	93rd (Highland) Regiment	H	0 – 4	
8 November 1890	Swindon Town	H	2 – 3	Stride, Wilkins
15 November 1890	Weymouth College	H	2 – 0	Carter, Farwell
22 November 1890	Royal Engineers, Aldershot	H	4 – 3	Nicholls (3), Kiddle
13 December 1890	Bournemouth	H	5 – 0	Farwell (2), Nicholls (2), Kiddle
7 February 1891	Reading	H	1 – 3	Stride
14 February 1891	Royal Engineers, Aldershot	A	1 – 5	Nicholls
28 February 1891	93rd (Highland) Regiment	A	0 – 4	
7 March 1891	Cowes	H	2 – 0	Bromley, Reid
28 March 1891	Mr. Gray's Cambridge XI	H	2 – 0	Delamotte, Farwell
30 March 1891	London Caledonians	N	2 – 0	Bromley, Richardson
8 April 1891	Freemantle	N	3 – 1	Bromley, Farwell, Warn

== Player statistics ==
The players who appeared in either of the two Cup tournaments were as follows. This list does not include players who only played in friendly matches.

Position	Name	Hampshire Cup apps	Hampshire Cup goals	Charity Cup apps	Charity Cup goals	Total apps	Total goals
FW	Frank Bromley	3	3	2	0	5	3
FB	George Carter	3	0	2	0	5	0
HB	Charles Deacon	3	0	2	0	5	0
FW	F. A. Delamotte	3	0	2	0	5	0
FW	Arthur Farwell	3	2	2	1	5	3
GK	A. A. Fry	1	0	0	0	1	0
FW	Bob Kiddle	3	2	2	0	5	2
FB	George Marshall	3	0	2	0	5	0
FW	Ernie Nicholls	3	3	2	2	5	5
GK	Ralph Ruffell	2	0	2	0	4	0
HB	William Stride	3	0	2	0	5	0
HB	George Verney	3	1	2	0	5	1

=== Key ===
- GK — Goalkeeper
- FB — Full back
- HB — Half-back
- FW — Forward

== Players ==
The players who made their first competitive appearance for the club in 1889–90 include the following:

- George Marshall (1869–1938) was a "sturdy, reliable defender" who remained with the club until 1896.
- Ernie Nicholls (1871–1971) had first played in friendly matches as a 16-year old in 1888. He remained with the club until the advent of the Southern League in 1894, during which period he was the club's most prolific goalscorer.

== Notes ==
- ^a Bournemouth "scratched" and no replay took place.

== Bibliography ==
- Bull, David; Brunskell, Bob (2000). Match of the Millennium. Hagiology Publishing. ISBN 0-9534474-1-3.
- Chalk, Gary; Holley, Duncan (1987). Saints – A complete record. Breedon Books. ISBN 0-907969-22-4.
- Holley, Duncan; Chalk, Gary (1992). The Alphabet of the Saints. ACL & Polar Publishing. ISBN 0-9514862-3-3.
- Juson, Dave; Bull, David (2001). Full-Time at The Dell. Hagiology Publishing. ISBN 0-9534474-2-1.
