= 1889–90 St. Mary's F.C. season =

English football club season

St. Mary's F.C.
1889–90 season
- Honorary President: Canon Basil Wilberforce
- Secretary: F. A. Delamotte
- Ground: Antelope Ground
- Hampshire Junior Cup: Winners
- Top goalscorer: League: N/A; All: Arthur Farwell (3)
- Highest home attendance: 2,800 (Hampshire Junior Cup final at the County Ground)
Home colours

1889–90 was the fifth season for St. Mary's Football Club (St. Mary's F.C.) based in Southampton in southern England. The club retained the Hampshire Junior Cup for the third consecutive year.

== Summary of season ==
The season saw the club move into the Antelope Ground which would be their permanent home for the next seven years. They also changed their strip, playing in cherry red squares rather than a white shirt with a red sash.

Although they were qualified to enter the Hampshire Senior Cup, the club committee decided to re-enter the Junior Cup, with a view to winning it for the third consecutive season, thereby enabling them to claim it outright. The passage through the cup was quite straightforward resulting in a 2–0 victory in the final against Lymington.

At the end of the season, the club had a balance of £50 thus making it the "richest club in Hampshire". Writing in the Bournemouth Guardian, "Offside" prophesied the advent of professionalism:

We shall be having some Scotchmen in the town soon. Perhaps "Captain" Carter will be taking a holiday among the Grampians this summer and coming back with a burly Highlander or two to help them to win the senior cup next year.

Such was the club's dominance in the county that for the match against Dorset, the Hampshire F.A. selected ten players from St. Mary's. After protests from Lymington, Cowes and other clubs, St. Mary's withdrew all their players from the team. This led to a change of policy by the Hampshire F.A. although St. Mary's players continued to dominate the county sides for many years.

== Personnel ==
Following the retirement of his brother Charles following injury, Frank Bromley took over permanently as centre-forward with former Southampton Harriers player Bob Kiddle alongside him. Arthur Fry retired during the season, leaving goalkeeper Ralph Ruffell as the only remaining player from the side who played in the inaugural match on 21 November 1885.

== Kit ==
Having played in white "tunics" with a red diagonal sash since their first match, the players kicked off the 1889–90 season in specially manufactured shirts of cherry and white quarters, with white shorts and dark blue socks. Writing some years later, F. J. Montgomery, who was a prominent committee member who also served as "umpire", claimed that the players "baulked at the expense of new shirts" and as a result he paid for them personally.

== Stadium ==
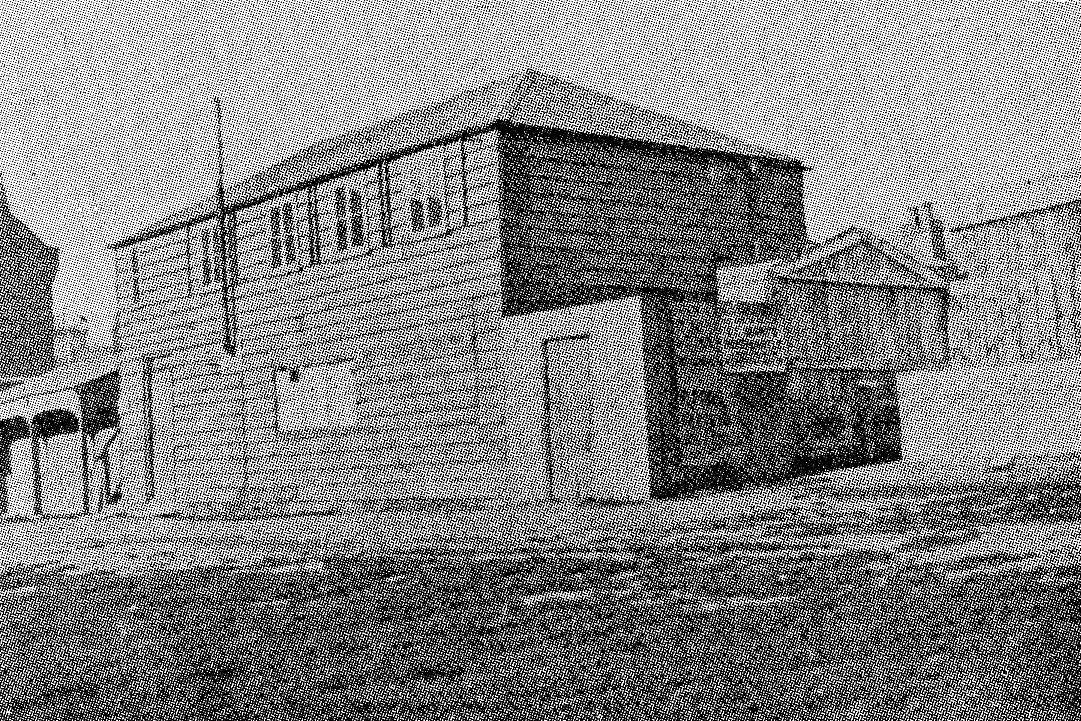
The players' dressing room at the Antelope Ground

Since its inception, the club had had no permanent home and generally played their home matches on Southampton Common, where spectators could watch for free, using the County Cricket Ground or the Antelope Ground for cup matches and more popular friendly matches. Following the demise of the Woolston Works club, the Antelope Ground was now available. The ground, which stood in St. Mary's road, between Brinton's Terrace and Clovelly Road, had initially been known as "Day's Ground" after the Hampshire cricketer Daniel Day.

The cricket club vacated the ground in 1884 to move to the County Ground, after which the Antelope Ground was used for rugby and association football matches, with the Woolston Works team renting it from 1887 until their demise in 1889. As a result, St. Mary's Football Club became joint tenants of the ground with the Trojans Rugby Club. Where there was a clash of fixtures, St. Mary's were still able to avail themselves of the County Ground, where the football club's "de facto" president, Dr. Russell Bencraft, was the cricket club's Hon. Secretary.

== Hampshire Junior Cup ==
Having won the Junior Cup in the two previous seasons, St. Mary's were qualified to play in the Hampshire Senior Cup, but the club committee decided to play another season in the Junior Cup with the intention of winning it for the third consecutive year, thus enabling them to win the cup outright.

The club received a bye into the second round, where they easily disposed of Boscombe (now A.F.C. Bournemouth). This gave them a repeat of the previous season's semi-final against Cowes, who were defeated in a straightforward 2–1 victory in a match played in a gale-force wind. The semi-final, against Winchester Rovers was played at the County Ground in a snowstorm and match reports indicated that St. Mary's were "fortunate" to emerge with a 1–0 victory. This set up a final against Lymington who had defeated Freemantle in the semi-final.

The final was played at the County Ground on 29 March 1890 on a "glorious afternoon". According to the Bournemouth Guardian, "the attendance at the County Ground cut the record. Altogether, over 2,000 paid for admission, which with ladies, members of the County Club, Bannister School, boysand officials, would give an attendance of something like 2,800". The gate receipts of £51 3s 6d, was reported as "the largest ever taken in the two counties (Hampshire and Dorset) and beats the big 'gate' at the Cowes match last year".^{a} The gate receipts were described as "a fortune" by William Pickford, the secretary of the Hampshire F.A.

St. Mary's dominated the final and the scoreline, 2–0 did not reflect their superiority. This led to criticism in the Bournemouth Guardian that "with forwards equal to the defence, St. Mary's might play a good game with better clubs than we often see in Hampshire; though I still have my doubts about Aston Villa".

=== Results ===
Date	Round	Opponents	H / A	Result F – A	Scorers	Attendance (estimated)
7 December 1889	2nd	Boscombe	A	2 – 0	Warn, Farwell	
25 January 1890	3rd	Cowes	H	4 – 2	Bromley, Farwell	
1 March 1890	Semi-final	Winchester Rovers	N	1 – 0	Kiddle	
29 March 1890	Final	Lymington	N	2 – 0	Farwell, Own goal	2,800

==== Legend ====
Win	Draw	Loss

== Friendly matches ==
St. Mary's continued to play most of their football in friendly matches against other local teams and touring sides. They went through the season undefeated, with one draw, against Bannister Court. The penultimate match of the season was against the Aldershot-based Royal Engineers who had recently won the Hampshire Senior Cup for the second successive year.

=== Results ===
The results of the friendly matches that are known were as follows:

Date	Opponents	H / A	Result F – A	Scorers
12 October 1889	Winchester City	H	4 – 0	Unknown
19 October 1889	Portsmouth Grammar School	H	5 – 0	Verney, Deacon, Delamotte (2), Kiddle
26 October 1889	Cowes	H	6 – 1	Warn, Farwell (2), Kiddle (3)
16 November 1889	Bournemouth	H	2 – 1	Farwell, Kiddle
23 November 1889	Geneva Cross	A	2 – 0	Farwell, Kiddle
30 November 1889	London Incogniti	H	5 – 0	Unknown
14 December 1889	Poole Harriers	H	7 – 0	Deacon (2), Warn, Farwell, Kiddle, Bromley, Delamotte
21 December 1889	Geneva Cross	H	3 – 0	Unknown
28 December 1889	South Saxon Swallows	H	3 – 1	Unknown
1 January 1890	South Saxon Swallows	N	2 – 0	Unknown
4 January 1890	Geneva Cross	H	1 – 0	Unknown
18 January 1890	Medical Staff Corps	H	3 – 0	Warn (2), Bromley
8 February 1890	Bannister Court	H	1 – 1	Unknown
22 February 1890	London Caledonians	H	2 – 0	Farwell (2)
8 March 1890	Christchurch	H	2 – 0	Carter (2)
12 April 1890	Royal Engineers, Aldershot	N	2 – 1	Delamotte, Warn
19 April 1890	Freemantle	N	4 – 0	Bromley, Delamotte, Farwell, Own goal

== Player statistics ==
The players who appeared in the Hampshire Junior Cup were as follows. This list does not include appearances or goals in friendly matches.

Position	Name	Apps	Goals
FW	Frank Bromley	4	1
HB	Brown	1	0
FB	George Carter	4	0
HB	Charles Deacon	3	0
FB	Denning	1	0
FW	F. A. Delamotte	4	0
FB	W. Duff	2	0
FW	Arthur Farwell	4	3
FB	A. A. Fry	1	0
FW	Bob Kiddle	4	1
HB	Bill Measures	1	0
GK	Ralph Ruffell	4	0
HB	William Stride	3	0
HB	George Verney	4	0
FW	M. Warn	4	1

=== Key ===
- GK — Goalkeeper
- FB — Full back
- HB — Half-back
- FW — Forward

== Players ==
The players who made their first appearance for the club in 1889–90 include the following:

- W. Duff was a member of the Military Staff Corps, who made two competitive appearances at full-back.
- Bob Kiddle (1869–1918) was described as an "athletic" forward who remained with the club until 1895, making one appearance in the Southern League.
- C. William "Bill" Measures was a soldier who played for the Geneva Cross team from Netley Hospital, although, as an amateur, he was also able to play for St. Mary's. In later years, he played in the Hampshire Cup competitions for Geneva Cross, but was registered to play for St. Mary's in the FA Cup matches, making his only appearance in the first qualifying round match at Warmley on 3 October 1891.

== Notes ==
- ^a The reports of the crowd and claims that this was "the biggest attendance ever to watch a soccer match in Hampshire" are inconsistent with claims of a crowd of 7,000 at the 1889 semi-final.

== Bibliography ==
- Bull, David; Brunskell, Bob (2000). Match of the Millennium. Hagiology Publishing. ISBN 0-9534474-1-3.
- Chalk, Gary; Holley, Duncan (1987). Saints – A complete record. Breedon Books. ISBN 0-907969-22-4.
- Holley, Duncan (2012). Suited and Booted. Bristol: Hagiology Publishing. ISBN 0-9534474-9-9.
- Holley, Duncan; Chalk, Gary (1992). The Alphabet of the Saints. ACL & Polar Publishing. ISBN 0-9514862-3-3.
- Juson, Dave; Bull, David (2001). Full-Time at The Dell. Hagiology Publishing. ISBN 0-9534474-2-1.
