= George Carter (footballer, born 1866) =

English footballer and manager

Personal information
- Date of birth: 16 February 1866
- Place of birth: Hereford, England
- Date of death: 23 January 1945 (aged 78)
- Place of death: Southampton, England
- Position: Full-back

Youth career
- Nil Desperandum

Senior career*
Years	Team	Apps	(Gls)
1887–1894	Southampton St. Mary's	0	(0)

Managerial career
- 1901–1915: Southampton Reserves
- * Club domestic league appearances and goals

George Carter (16 February 1866 – 23 January 1945) was an English footballer and all-round sportsman who played a prominent part in the early history of Southampton Football Club, leading them to success in local cup tournaments and captaining the side in their first FA Cup match in 1891.

== Early life ==
Carter was born in Hereford and represented his county at both football and cricket. He is recorded as making three appearances for Herefordshire County Cricket Club in 1885, against Worcestershire in July and again in August and against MCC in August.

Carter was employed as an engraver by the Ordnance Survey and in 1887 he was posted to their offices in Southampton. Speaking in 1999, Carter's daughter-in-law, Nellie Carter, said that Carter was "not at all happy" about being posted to Southampton and that Carter maintained that the move was arranged by Dr. Russell Bencraft who was medical officer at the Ordnance Survey and the first president of Southampton St. Mary's F.C.

== Football career ==
In October 1887, he was introduced to Southampton St. Mary's F.C. and asked to play as a full-back. He played at right-back in the club's first appearance in a cup tournament, in the Hampshire Junior Cup against Totton on 26 November 1887. The match was won 1–0, with "Carter's playing at the back (being) a distinctive feature of the game". The team went on to defeat Petersfield 10–0 in the next round, with five goals from A. A. Fry and four from captain C.E. (Ned) Bromley. This was followed by victories over Lymington (4–0) and Bournemouth Arabs (2–1) before the final against Southampton Harriers. The first match, played at the County Cricket Ground ended in a 2–2 draw, with St. Mary's taking the replay on 24 March by a 2–1 margin, thus winning their first trophy. Carter appeared in all six matches in the cup tournament, playing at right-back.

In the summer of 1888, Ned Bromley moved to London to study dentistry and Carter was appointed team captain, a position he was to retain for the next six years. As captain, Carter was described as "a gentleman and a generous opponent".

In the third round of the Hampshire Junior Cup, St. Mary's were drawn to play Fordingbridge Turks on 12 January 1889. Carter and three other St. Mary's players had been selected to play for the Hampshire F.A. against Berks & Bucks on the same day. St. Mary's tried to get the match against the Turks re-arranged but the New Forest club refused. Consequently, St. Mary's withdrew their four players from the county match to play in the cup. The "Saints" won the match (played at the Antelope Ground) 3–2, earning them a semi-final appearance against Cowes.

The first match, played at Northwood Park in Cowes, ended in a 1–1 draw; the Cowes captain requested extra time but Carter refused, claiming that the team would miss their ferry home from the Isle of Wight. The replay at the County Ground was also drawn, thus requiring a third match. The sides had each scored once by half-time and the scores were level when a shot from M. Warn was caught well behind the line by the Cowes goalkeeper who quickly threw the ball out. After claims and counter-claims from both teams, the referee awarded a goal to St. Mary's. After the match, Cowes lodged a formal written protest with the Hampshire F.A. which was initially rejected but this was overturned after an appeal from Cowes, who claimed that the linesman had stopped the ball with his flag while it was still in play. The third replay, also at the County Ground, was a heated affair watched by a crowd estimated at 7,000 but St. Mary's won 4–1 to earn their place in the final. This was played at Bar End, Winchester against Christchurch on 6 April and was rather an anti-climax, with St. Mary's winning 3–0 to retain the trophy. In 1891, St. Mary's had a relatively straightforward passage to the final of the Hampshire Junior Cup, where they defeated Lymington 2–0. Having won the cup for three consecutive years, the Saints retained the trophy permanently.

In the following season, St. Mary's entered the Hampshire Senior Cup for the first time and reached the final against the winners of the two previous years, the Royal Engineers based at Aldershot. In the final, played at the County Ground on 14 March 1891, the Saints took an early lead through Ernie Nicholls before "a rare slip" from Carter allowed the engineers to equalise. Two second-half goals, from Frank Bromley and Bob Kiddle, saw St. Mary's claim the senior cup for the first time.

The success in local cup competitions prompted the club committee to enter a national tournament for the first time – in the first qualifying round of the FA Cup on 3 October 1891, they played at Warmley near Bristol winning comfortably 4–1, with Carter scoring his only goal in a competitive match. The draw for the next round was a home match against Reading to be played on 24 October 1891. Two weeks before the tie at the Antelope Ground, the Saints arranged a friendly against the 93rd Argyll and Sutherland Highlanders, after which two members of the Highlanders side, Pte. Jock Fleming and Sgt. Alexander McMillan, were signed by the Saints. The FA Cup 2nd Qualifying match was played at the Antelope Ground on 24 October, and ended in a 7–0 victory to the "Saints", in which Private Fleming featured strongly with his aggressive style of play earning him a hat-trick. At the reception after the match, the Reading secretary asked for, and received, an advance of £3 on the share of the gate money. With this he immediately sent a telegram of protest accompanied by the necessary fee of 2 guineas to the Football Association claiming that the Saints had fielded illegally registered players in Fleming and McMillan. The claim was upheld by the F.A., who found that the players had not been registered at least 28 days before the match, and as the Saints had not complied with the requirements of Rule 5 they were thus expelled from the competition.

In March 1892, St. Mary's retained the Hampshire Senior Cup, with an easy 5–0 victory over a Medical Staff team.

In the second qualifying round of the 1892–93 FA Cup, St. Mary's were easily defeated 4–0 by Maidenhead, for whom three goals were scored by F.W. Janes. St. Mary's promptly signed Janes on professional terms, but the signing was revoked by the Football Association, who judged that he was "in no fit condition to realise what he was doing when he signed for Southampton".

St. Mary's also competed in the Hampshire Senior Cup in 1892–93, hoping to claim a third consecutive victory. After 2–0 wins over the Royal Engineers and a side from Portsmouth, they reached the final against local rivals Freemantle. The final was played on 11 March 1893 at the County Ground in front of a substantial crowd who threatened to spill onto the pitch. Freemantle led 1–0 at half-time before Jack Dollin equalised. With the score 1–1 and only a few minutes left to play, a Freemantle forward, Horton, was about to score past Ralph Ruffell in the Saints' goal when he was tripped by William Stride. Despite protests from the "Saints", the referee awarded a penalty to Freemantle, which was converted by Shirley Hawkins, giving Freemantle their first trophy. After the match, Carter protested to the referee that the foul had been committed outside the penalty area, saying that he could point out the exact spot where the offence occurred. The referee, Mr. Royston Bourke, replied: "In that case, I suggest you have a tombstone erected over it."

In 1893–94, St. Mary's, by now largely a professional side, were again eliminated from the FA Cup in the qualifying rounds, going out to Reading. Carter damaged a leg in a friendly match in December 1893 thus ending his playing career. With George Marshall now playing at right-back, St. Mary's reached the final of the Hampshire Senior Cup again in March 1894, but were defeated 1–0 by the Royal Engineers.

Carter was unable to fully recover from his leg injury and he retired from playing football in May 1894, thus missing the club's first season in the Southern League. In his seven years with St. Mary's, Carter made six appearances in the FA Cup, scoring once; he also played in the finals of seven local cup tournaments, of which only the 1893 final of the Hampshire Senior Cup ended in defeat.

== Later career ==
Following his retirement, Carter was presented with a gold watch. He continued to work for the club, and in 1901 he became the manager of the reserve team, continuing in this role until the start of World War I, helping to develop the careers of players such as Fred Harrison, Frank Jefferis and Arthur Dominy.

After he stepped down as reserve-team manager, Carter was made a life-member of Southampton Football Club. He was a member of the Southampton Amateur Swimming Club, and represented Hampshire at water polo.

He was employed by the Ordnance Survey in Southampton, until he retired in 1927, after 40 years' service.
