= George Ridges =

English footballer

Personal information
- Date of birth: 1867
- Place of birth: Freemantle, England
- Date of death: 7 April 1940 (aged 72–73)
- Place of death: Southampton, England
- Position: Inside forward

Senior career*
Years	Team	Apps	(Gls)
- Southampton Harriers
- Freemantle
1892	→ Southampton St. Mary's (loan)	0	(0)
- * Club domestic league appearances and goals

George Ridges (1867 – 7 April 1940) was an English footballer who made one appearance, at inside-right in the FA Cup for Southampton St. Mary's in 1892.

== Football career ==
Ridges started his football career with Southampton Harriers before joining Freemantle. In August 1892, Southampton St. Mary's were endeavouring to strengthen their side and decided to recruit players on professional terms. One of the first players they attempted to recruit was Ridges, but he refused their offer.

In October, however, the "Saints" had persuaded Ridges to join them on a temporary basis in order to play in the Second Qualifying Round match in the FA Cup against Maidenhead. The match was played at the Antelope Ground and ended in a 4–0 defeat; this was the "Saints" first defeat in a major cup match.

Ridges returned to Freemantle and, as captain, led them to the final of the Hampshire Senior Cup against St. Mary's. The final was played at the County Cricket Ground on 11 March 1893. Freemantle led 1–0 at half-time before Jack Dollin equalised. With the score 1–1 and only a few minutes left to play, a Freemantle forward, Horton, was about to score past Ralph Ruffell in the Saints' goal when he was tripped by William Stride. Although the Saints protested that the foul was outside the penalty area, the referee awarded a penalty to Freemantle, which was converted by Shirley Hawkins, giving Freemantle their first trophy.
