= George Verney =

English footballer

Personal information
- Full name: William George Verney
- Date of birth: January 1871
- Place of birth: Aldershot, England
- Date of death: 1950 (age 79)
- Place of death: Willesden, England
- Position: Half-back

Senior career*
Years	Team	Apps	(Gls)
1888–1896	Southampton St. Mary's	0	(0)
1898–????	Cranbury Avenue		
- * Club domestic league appearances and goals

William George Verney (1871–1950) was an English footballer who made six appearances as a half-back, scoring once, in the FA Cup for Southampton St. Mary's between 1888 and 1896.

== Football career ==
Verney joined Southampton St. Mary's in 1888, three years after they had been founded. Described as "a tenacious half-back" who persisted "in his efforts to challenge for every loose ball", he linked up well with William Stride.

In March 1889, Verney was part of the St. Mary's team that played four matches to get past Cowes in the semi-final of the Hampshire Junior Cup, with the opening goal in the third replay resulting from his corner-kick, which he followed up by scoring the second goal when his shot went past the goalkeeper who had been charged by another player. The "Saints" won the match 4–1 and went on to win the cup with a 3–0 victory over Christchurch in the final. They retained the trophy by defeating Lymington 2–0 in the following year.

In January 1891, St. Mary's entered the Hampshire Senior Cup for the first time. In the second round, they met Geneva Cross, a team from the Royal Victoria Military Hospital at Netley. The match was played at the Antelope Ground on a pitch that was frozen in places with "ankle deep mud" at the Infirmary End, but St. Mary's emerged victorious with Verney scoring one of five goals. St. Mary's progressed to the final where they defeated a team from the Royal Engineers, based at Aldershot, by a 2–1 margin.

The success in local cup competitions prompted the club committee to enter a national tournament for the first time – in the first qualifying round of the FA Cup on 3 October 1891, they played at Warmley near Bristol, winning comfortably 4–1, with Verney playing at left-half. In the next round, St. Mary's defeated Reading 7–0, with Verney scoring one of the goals, but the match was awarded to Reading following an FA enquiry into the eligibility of two St. Mary's players, Jock Fleming and Alexander McMillan. In March 1892, St. Mary's retained the Hampshire Senior Cup, with an easy 5–0 victory over a Medical Staff team.

In 1892–93, Verney played in both FA Cup matches, with the Saints going out 4–0 to Maidenhead and in all three Hampshire Senior Cup matches, losing 1–2 to Freemantle in the final. In the following year, he was again ever-present in both cups, with St. Mary's going out to Reading in the second qualifying round of the FA Cup and losing the final of the Hampshire Senior Cup to the Royal Engineers.

In 1894, St. Mary's were founder members of the Southern League. Although Verney remained with St. Mary's until 1896, his last two seasons were spent in the reserves and he made no Southern League appearances.

After leaving the Saints, Verney turned out occasionally for a minor local side, Cranbury Avenue.
