= Arthur Mulford =

English footballer (1871–1920)

Personal information
- Full name: Arthur Henry Mulford
- Date of birth: January qtr. 1871
- Place of birth: Southampton, England
- Date of death: 1920
- Place of death: Egypt
- Position: Forward

Senior career*
Years	Team	Apps	(Gls)
1891–1892	Southampton St. Mary's	0	(0)
- * Club domestic league appearances and goals

Arthur Henry Mulford (1871–1920) was an English amateur footballer who played as a forward for St. Mary's Football Club from 1891 to 1892, making one appearance in the FA Cup.

== Football career ==
Mulford was born in Southampton and made his first appearance for St. Mary's in a friendly match against Reading on 26 September 1891. He made his competitive debut a week later in the club's first-ever appearance in the FA Cup, a First Qualifying Round match at Warmley, which was won 4–1. For the next round against Reading, he was replaced by Jock Fleming who scored a hat-trick in a 7–0 victory, although this result was overturned because Fleming had not been registered in time.

Mulford continued to play in friendly matches, including scoring in a 6–2 defeat at Woolwich Arsenal on 27 February 1892. He returned to FA Cup action when he scored in the first qualifying round match against Newbury on 15 October 1892 (with the other three goals coming from Bob Kiddle). He scored again against Woolwich Arsenal in a 2–0 victory on 10 December, with his final competitive appearance coming in Round 3 of the Hampshire Senior Cup against the Royal Engineers on 17 December 1892.

== Death ==
Mulford died in Egypt in 1920.
