= Jack Dorkin =

English footballer

Personal information
- Date of birth: July 1866
- Place of birth: Aboard the SS Tamar, at sea
- Position: Forward

Senior career*
Years	Team	Apps	(Gls)
1883–18??	Ipswich Rangers		
??????	St Bernard's		
????–1893	Royal Engineers		
1893–1895	Southampton St. Mary's	3	(3)
1902	Basingstoke		

Managerial career
- 1908–19??: Romsey Town
- * Club domestic league appearances and goals

Jack W. Dorkin (born July 1866, at sea on board the SS Tamar) was an English professional footballer who played as a forward for Southampton St. Mary's in the 1890s.

== Football career ==
Dorkin's early career took him to various parts of the country; his first recorded club was Ipswich Rangers in 1893. He subsequently played in Scotland with St Bernard's before joining the Royal Engineers at Chatham, where he represented the Army in a match against the Corinthians.

In January 1893, he was "bought out" of the Royal Engineers by Southampton St. Mary's, and became one of the club's first professional players. In the two seasons before the inauguration of the Southern League, he was a regular selection at centre-forward and a prolific goal-scorer. In 1893–94, Dorkin played in the qualifying rounds of the FA Cup, a 3–1 victory against Uxbridge in qualifying round One, followed by a 2–1 defeat at Reading. He also appeared regularly in various local cup competitions, helping the Saints reach three finals, winning the Hampshire County Cricket Club Charity Cup, defeating the Royal Artillery 5–0 in the final.

In 1894, Southampton were one of the nine founder members of the Southern League, which had been created to enable clubs in southern England, that were not admitted to the Football League to play competitive football on a regular basis. By now, Dorkin was past his prime and only made his league debut near the end of the season, when he played and scored in each of the last three matches.

He retired from professional football in the summer of 1895. Two years later, he was persuaded to come out of retirement to take part in a six-a-side tournament, but this ended with him breaking a leg. He made a brief comeback in November 1902 with Basingstoke and was later the coach/manager at Romsey Town.

== Career outside sport ==
In partnership with former Southampton St. Mary's footballer and Hampshire cricketer Victor Barton, Dorkin ran a sports outfitters business in Southampton.
