= Ernest Powell =

English cricketer and educator

Personal information
- Full name: Ernest Ormsby Powell
- Born: 19 January 1861; Liverpool, Lancashire, England
- Died: 29 March 1928 (aged 67); Stafford, Staffordshire, England
- Batting: Right-handed

Domestic team information
- Years: Team
- 1882: Surrey
- 1883–1884: Cambridge University
- 1884–1885: Hampshire
- 1888–1895: Marylebone Cricket Club

Career statistics
Competition	First-class
Matches	21
Runs scored	1,024
Batting average	27.67
100s/50s	1/6
Top score	140
Catches/stumpings	10/–
- Source: Cricinfo, 17 February 2010

Ernest Ormsby Powell (19 January 1861 — 29 March 1928) was an English first-class cricketer and educator.

The son of The Reverend Isaac Ormsby Powell, an Irish clergyman originally from Sligo, Powell was born at Liverpool in January 1861. He was educated at Charterhouse School, where he played for the school cricket team. From there, he matriculated in 1880 to King's College, Cambridge. During his second year at Cambridge, he made his debut in first-class cricket for Surrey against Middlesex at The Oval, with Powell making four appearances for Surrey in 1882. While at Cambridge, he also made two first-class appearances for Cambridge University against the Marylebone Cricket Club (MCC) in 1883 and 1884. After leaving Cambridge in 1884, Powell began playing first-class for Hampshire, making his debut against Sussex at Southampton in 1884. He played first-class cricket for Hampshire until 1885, making eleven appearances. In these, he scored 759 runs at an average of 39.94; he made four half centuries and one century, which was a score of 140 against Somerset in 1884, with his second-highest score being 99 against Surrey. In addition to playing for the aforementioned teams, Powell also played first-class cricket for the MCC on three occasions between 1888 and 1895, and once the Gentlemen of the South in 1885. Overall, in 21 first-class matches he scored 1,024 runs at an average of 27.67, making six half centuries alongside his single century.

After graduating from Cambridge he trained to become a solicitor, having passed his final exams in 1887. However, ultimately he decided to embark on a teaching career. In 1901, he was appointed headmaster of the King Edward VI Grammar School in Stafford, an appointment he held until 1924. Amongst his pupils at Stafford were Walter Robins, the future England Test cricketer, with Powell recognising his talents as a cricketer. He was a member of Stafford Cricket Club and served on its committee, where he helped ensure the lease of their ground, The Hough. Powell died at his Brunswick Terrace residence in Stafford in March 1928. He is memorialised on the stained glass Powell Memorial Window which adorns the Great Hall at the now closed King Edward VI Grammar School.
