= Frank Bromley =

English footballer

Personal information
- Full name: Frank Charles Bromley
- Date of birth: 1872
- Place of birth: Southampton, England
- Date of death: 1 August 1938
- Place of death: Hendon, England
- Positions: Forward; centre-half

Senior career*
Years	Team	Apps	(Gls)
1887–1891	St. Mary's	0	(0)
- * Club domestic league appearances and goals

Frank Charles Bromley (1872–1 August 1938) was an English footballer. Originally from Southampton, he played as a forward for local side St. Mary's between 1887 and 1891.

== Life and career ==
The younger brother of Charles "Ned" Bromley, Frank Bromley made his debut appearance for St. Mary's on 21 January 1888 in the third round of the Hampshire Junior Cup, scoring from the position of centre-half in the 4–0 win over Lymington, his only appearance of the season. Bromley also made just one appearance in the tournament the following season, in the first round against Havant, scoring four of his side's goals in the 5–0 win.

In his third season with the club, Bromley became a more prominent member of the St. Mary's lineup, playing in all four games of the Junior Cup and scoring in one as the Saints won the tournament for the third consecutive year. He also played in every competitive match of the 1890–91 season, scoring in each round of the team's first Hampshire Senior Cup win in the process and playing in both Hampshire County Cricket Club Charity Cup matches.

After ending his playing career in 1891, Bromley followed in his older brother's footsteps by pursuing a career in dentistry; he moved to Hendon, London to practice, where he died in August 1938.

== Bibliography ==
- Chalk, Gary; Holley, Duncan (1987). Saints – A complete record. Breedon Books. ISBN 0-907969-22-4.
- Chalk, Gary; Holley, Duncan; Bull, David (2013), All the Saints: A Complete Players' Who's Who of Southampton FC, Hagiology Publishing, ISBN 978-0-9926864-0-6
