= Day's Itchen Ground =

Cricket ground in Hampshire, England

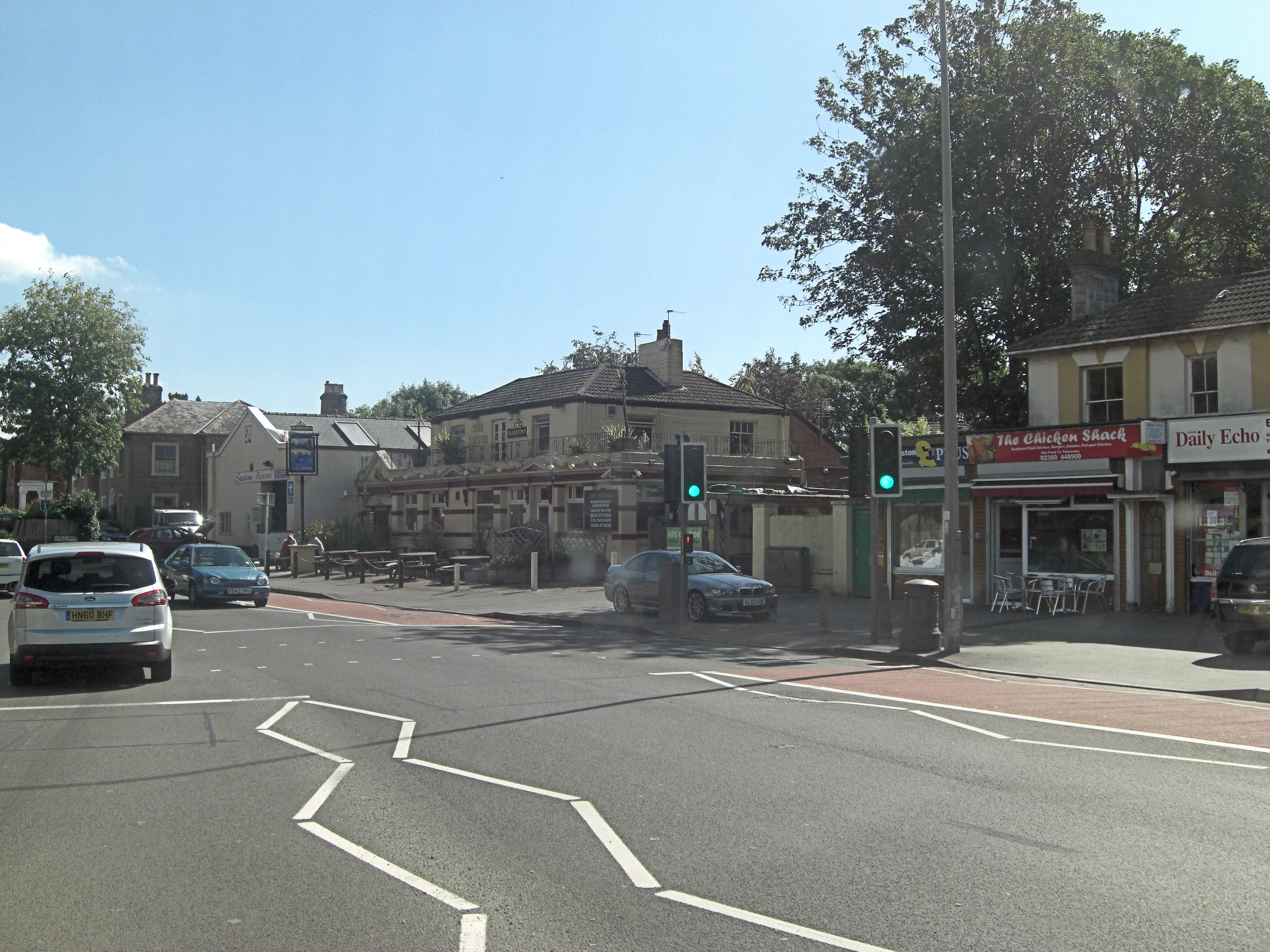
- A modern view of The Woolston Hotel, now known as The Cricketers Arms. The ground lay beyond it.
- Interactive map of Day's Itchen Ground

Ground information
- Location: Southampton, Hampshire
- Country: England
- Coordinates: 50.8971°N 1.3736°W
- Establishment: 1845
- Demolished: 1851

Team information
Hampshire	(1848–1850)
- As of 15 July 2023; Source: Ground profile

Day's Itchen Ground was a cricket ground in Southampton, which hosted first-class cricket from 1848 to 1850.

== History ==
County cricket in Southampton had been played across the River Itchen at the Antelope Ground since 1839. In 1845, the ground was threatened by building speculation, which prompted Daniel Day to move to a ground across the river at Woolston on a field owned by the Woolston Hotel. The ground's total area was roughly 6 acres (24,000 m^{2}), with a wooden cricket pavilion being constructed on its north side. The first match was played there in March 1846, when the Married of Southampton played the Single of Southampton. First-class cricket was first played there in 1848, when Hampshire played the All England Eleven. Subsequently, two further first-class matches were played there between the sides in 1849 and 1850. Day found the ground to be financially unviable, having cost him between £1,000 and £2,000. He moved to Portsmouth to manage the East Hampshire Cricket Ground at Southsea when the lease at the Itchen Ground expired in 1851. The ground was subsequently built over in the 1850s, with first-class cricket in Southampton returning to the Antelope Ground until 1884.

== Records ==
=== First-class ===
- Highest team total: 131 all out by All England Eleven v Hampshire, 1850
- Lowest team total: 22 all out by All England Eleven v Hampshire, 1848
- Highest individual innings: 46 by Joe Guy for All England Eleven v Hampshire, 1850
- Best bowling in an innings: 8-1? (scorecard incomplete) by William Hillyer, as above
- Best bowling in a match: 14-48 by William Hillyer for All England Eleven v Hampshire, 1848
