= Itchen Urban District =

Former local government area in Hampshire, England

Coordinates: 50.902°N 1.366°W

Itchen was an urban district in Hampshire, England, from 1898 to 1920.

It was formed in 1898 from the parishes of St Mary Extra and Sholing (itself created in 1894 from part of the Hound parish). From 1894 to 1898 both these parishes had formed part of the South Stoneham Rural District. A unified parish of Itchen, coterminous with the urban district was created in 1903. The urban district was abolished in 1920 and added to the county borough of Southampton.
