= HMS Tamar =

Six ships and a naval station of the Royal Navy have been called HMS Tamar, after the River Tamar in South West England:

- HMS Tamar (1758) was a 16-gun sloop launched at Saltash in 1758 and stationed in Newfoundland from 1763. She was renamed HMS Pluto and became a fire-ship in 1777; the French captured her in 1780.
- HMS Tamar (1795) was a store lighter launched in 1795 and purchased that year for Navy service. She was broken up in 1798.
- HMS Tamar (1796) was a 38-gun fifth rate launched in 1796 and broken up in 1810.
- HMS Tamar (1814) was a 26-gun sixth rate launched in 1814, converted into a coal hulk in 1831 and sold in 1837.
- HMS Tamar (1863) was an iron screw troop ship launched in 1863. She became a base ship in Hong Kong in 1897 and was scuttled in 1941.
- HMS Tamar (shore station) was the name for the Royal Navy's shore base in Hong Kong from 1897 to 1997, named after the initial vessel to serve as the base ship.
- HMS Tamar (P233) is a Batch 2 River-class patrol vessel constructed in Govan for delivery to the Royal Navy in 2020.

The River-class frigate HMS Aire was briefly renamed Tamar on her transfer to the base in Hong Kong on 14 March 1946 as the nominal depot ship. The name reverted to Aire on 20 November 1946. She was wrecked in the early hours of 20 December 1946 when a typhoon drove her aground on Bombay Reef.

== SS Tamar ==
Four ships of Royal Mail Steam Packet Company bore the name SS Tamar between 1854 and 1922. One of these, a 3,207-ton steamer built in 1902, was captured and sunk sank off Brazil by the Kronprinz Wilhelm during World War I on 24 March 1915, while on a passage from Santos to Le Havre.
