= Joseph Price (footballer) =

English footballer

Personal information
- Position: Full-back

Senior career*
Years	Team	Apps	(Gls)
18??–1891	Geneva Cross		
1891–1894	Southampton St. Mary's	0	(0)
- * Club domestic league appearances and goals

Joseph Price was an amateur footballer who played as a full-back for Southampton St. Mary's in the 1890s.

== Football career ==
Price started his career playing for Geneva Cross, a team from the Royal Victoria Military Hospital at Netley. In January 1891, Geneva Cross played St. Mary's in the Second Round of the Hampshire Senior Cup, losing 5–0. Despite the loss, Price was shortly afterwards recruited by St. Mary's on amateur terms. Described as a "hard-tackling full-back" with "speed and finesse", his departure from the Geneva Cross team was not popular with their supporters.

Price made his competitive debut for St. Mary's on 17 December 1892 in a Hampshire Senior Cup match against a team from the Royal Engineers; the team went on to reach the final where they lost 2–1 to Freemantle. He played in the FA Cup 2nd Qualifying Round match at Reading, which was also lost 2–1.

In January 1894, Price sustained a serious leg injury which ended his career.
