= Bar End =

Neighbourhood of Winchester, Hampshire, England

Coordinates: 51.053688°N 1.304381°W

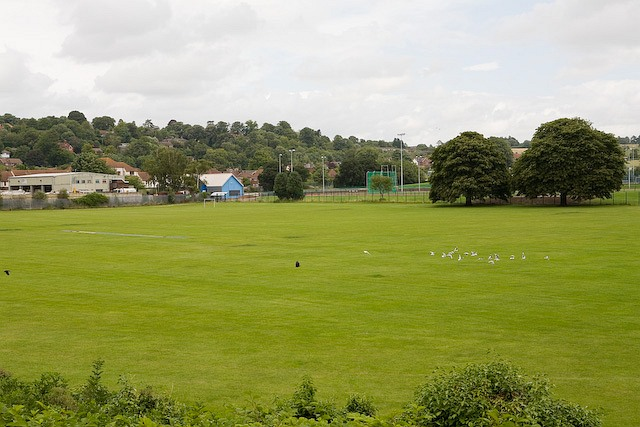
- Bar End Sports Ground, Winchester

- Location within Hampshire
- OS grid reference: SU487285
- District: Winchester
- Shire county: Hampshire
- Region: South East
- Country: England
- Sovereign state: United Kingdom
- Post town: Winchester
- Postcode district: SO23
- Dialling code: 01962
- Police: Hampshire and Isle of Wight
- Fire: Hampshire and Isle of Wight
- Ambulance: South Central
- UK Parliament: Winchester

Bar End is an area of Winchester, Hampshire, England. It lies on the east bank of the River Itchen to the north of St. Catherine's Hill and is the location of a park and ride car park serving the city centre. Winchester Council announced in 2022 plans to regenerate the area.

== Community facilities ==
There is a public sports ground.
