= Freeman Delamotte =

English footballer

Personal information
- Full name: Freeman Alexander Delamotte
- Date of birth: January 1870
- Place of birth: Birkenhead, England
- Date of death: 14 April 1933 (aged 63)
- Place of death: Llandudno, Wales
- Position: Forward

Senior career*
Years	Team	Apps	(Gls)
1888–1893	Southampton St. Mary's	0	(0)
- * Club domestic league appearances and goals

Freeman Alexander Delamotte (1870 – 14 April 1933) was an English footballer who played as a forward in the early years of Southampton St. Mary's, including making two appearances in the FA Cup.

== Football career ==
Delamotte joined St. Mary's in 1888 and took over the role of secretary from George Muir who had guided the club since its foundation three years earlier.

Delamotte generally played at outside-left and made his first cup appearance for the "Saints" in the Hampshire Junior Cup on 24 November 1888, scoring a goal in a 5–0 victory over Havant. Delamotte appeared in all seven matches (including the semi-final against Cowes which took four matches to decide) and scored in the final on 6 April 1889, a 3–0 victory over Christchurch.

He had a reputation for charging the opposition goalkeeper and the supporters would cry out: "Go for him, Delly". He scored goals regularly and was ever-present in the club's runs to victory in the Hampshire Junior Cup in 1889–90 and in the Hampshire Senior Cup in 1890–91.

In 1891–92, he played and scored in both qualifying rounds of the FA Cup, a 4–1 victory at Warmley and a 7–0 victory against Reading, although the latter match was awarded to Reading by the F.A. as St. Mary's had fielded two ineligible players. St. Mary's made up for their disappointment by winning the Hampshire Senior Cup for the second consecutive year, with Delamotte scoring one of five goals in the final.

In the next season, Delamotte's job as a surveyor took him to Derby making him unavailable for the two FA Cup matches played in October, although he returned in December to play in all three Hampshire Senior Cup matches, as St. Mary's lost to Freemantle in the final, their first defeat in a Hampshire cup match since the Hampshire F.A. was founded in 1887.

== Later career ==
In the summer of 1893, Delamotte left Hampshire when he was appointed as the Borough Survey in Conway, North Wales.
