= Arthur Farwell (footballer) =

English footballer

Personal information
- Date of death: December 1940
- Position: Forward

Senior career*
Years	Team	Apps	(Gls)
1888–1893	Southampton St. Mary's	0	(0)
- * Club domestic league appearances and goals

Arthur G. Farwell (died December 1940) was a footballer who played as a forward in the early years of Southampton St. Mary's, including making two appearances in the FA Cup.

== Football career ==
Farwell joined St. Mary's in 1888 and remained with the club for five years.

Described as "quick and full of tricks", many of his goals came at vital moments in important games. He had played in the earlier rounds of the Hampshire Junior Cup in 1888–89; in the semi-final against Cowes on 24 February 1889, the "Saints" were 1–0 down with two minutes to play when Farwell equalised with a "screw shot". Farwell appeared in all seven matches as the Saints eventually reached the final on 6 April 1889, a 3–0 victory over Christchurch.

He scored goals regularly and was ever-present in the club's runs to victory in the Hampshire Junior Cup in 1889–90 (scoring in the final) and in the Hampshire Senior Cup in 1890–91.

In 1891–92, he played (without scoring) in both qualifying rounds of the FA Cup, a 4–1 victory at Warmley and a 7–0 victory against Reading, although the latter match was awarded to Reading by the F.A. as St. Mary's had fielded two ineligible players. St. Mary's made up for their disappointment by winning the Hampshire Senior Cup for the second consecutive year, with Farwell scoring one of five goals in the final.

Although he remained with the club until the summer of 1893, he was employed in the drapery department of the Edwin Jones store, thus making him unavailable for Saturday afternoon matches. Consequently, he did not play in that season's FA Cup matches, although he did play in all three Hampshire Senior Cup matches, including the 2–1 defeat to Freemantle in the final.

== Later career ==
Following the introduction of professionalism in 1892–93, Farwell retired and became a draper in Havant. He maintained his contact with the St. Mary's area of Southampton as he was a member of the St. Mary's Church choir. He died in December 1940.
