= Ernie Nicholls =

English footballer

Personal information
- Full name: Ernest Frederick Nicholls
- Date of birth: 21 November 1871
- Place of birth: Southampton, England
- Date of death: February 1971 (aged 99)
- Place of death: Southampton, England
- Position: Centre-forward

Senior career*
Years	Team	Apps	(Gls)
1888–1894	Southampton St. Mary's	0	(0)
- * Club domestic league appearances and goals

Ernest Frederick Nicholls (21 November 1871 – February 1971) was an English footballer who played as a centre-forward for Southampton St. Mary's in the pre-professional era, being the club's most prolific goalscorer. He scored the club's first goal in the FA Cup in October 1891.

== Football career ==
Nicholls was born in Southampton and joined the Southampton St. Mary's in 1888, aged 16. At first, his appearances were restricted to friendly matches and he was not selected for the club's successes in the Hampshire Junior Cup. From the autumn of 1890 onwards, he became a regular member of the team, scoring hat-tricks in friendlies against Winchester City and the Royal Engineers.

On 24 January 1891, he played at outside-left in the second round of the Hampshire Senior Cup, scoring in a 5–0 victory over Geneva Cross, a team based at the Royal Victoria Hospital, Netley. Nicholls followed this up with a goal in the semi-final (against Banister Court School) setting up the final against the holders, a team from the Royal Engineers from Aldershot. Nicholls opened the scoring in the 20th minute with "a stinging shot no goalkeeper could have saved" before the engineers equalised. Two second-half goals, from Frank Bromley and Bob Kiddle, saw St. Mary's claim the senior cup for the first time.

The success in local cup competitions prompted the club committee to enter a national tournament for the first time – in the first qualifying round of the FA Cup on 3 October 1891, they played at Warmley near Bristol, winning comfortably 4–1 with Nicholls, who was playing at centre-forward, scoring the opening goal after 15 minutes, followed by a second late on in the match. In the next round, St. Mary's defeated Reading 7–0, with Nicholls scoring one of the goals, but the match was awarded to Reading following an FA enquiry into the eligibility of two St. Mary's players, Jock Fleming and Alexander McMillan. In March 1892, St. Mary's retained the Hampshire Senior Cup, with an easy 5–0 victory over a Medical Staff team, with Nicholls scoring twice.

In 1892–93, Nicholls played the second qualifying round of the FA Cup, with the Saints going out 4–0 to Maidenhead and in all three Hampshire Senior Cup matches, losing 1–2 to Freemantle in the final. In the following year, he played in both FA Cup matches, with St. Mary's going out to Reading in the second qualifying round. In the Hampshire Senior Cup, he missed the semi-final against Freemantle but did play in the final which was lost 1–0 to the Royal Engineers.

In 1894, St. Mary's were founder members of the Southern League. Not wanting to commit to regular league football, Nicholls decided to retire from the club, having scored over 40 goals in all fixtures for the club, with four goals from his five F.A. Cup appearances.

== Later life ==
Nicholls was also a fine all-round cricketer who played for the Deanery club from 1901 to 1922, and became their captain in 1902.

He continued to live in Southampton and was a season-ticket holder at The Dell. He died in February 1971, nine months short of his hundredth birthday.
