= William Stride =

English footballer

Personal information
- Full name: William John Stride
- Date of birth: 1865
- Place of birth: Southampton, England
- Date of death: 21 February 1942 (aged 76–77)
- Place of death: Southampton, England
- Position: Half-back

Senior career*
Years	Team	Apps	(Gls)
- Freemantle
1887–1888	Southampton Harriers		
1888–1894	Southampton St. Mary's	0	(0)
- * Club domestic league appearances and goals

William John Stride (1865 – 21 February 1942) was an English footballer who made four appearances as a half-back in the FA Cup for Southampton St. Mary's between 1888 and 1894. Throughout his career, he was known as "Banquo" Stride.

== Football career ==
In his youth, Stride was an all-round sportsman, who was described as an athlete "par excellence", winning many prizes as a runner with the Southampton Athletic Association. He started his football career with Freemantle before joining the short-lived Southampton Harriers club.

The Harriers had started life as the Temperance Amateur Athletic Association but changed their name in 1885. In 1887, they decided to enter the inaugural Hampshire Junior Cup unlike Freemantle who declined the invitation; as a consequence, many Freemantle players, including Stride, signed on for the Harriers instead.

On 10 March 1888, Harriers met St. Mary's in the first final of the Hampshire Junior Cup. The first match, played at the County Cricket Ground ended in a 2–2 draw, with St. Mary's taking the replay on 24 March by a 2–1 margin, thus winning the trophy for the first time. In the summer of 1888, the Freemantle club acquired their own ground in Southampton following which, most of the Harriers' players returned, with the exception of Stride, who joined St. Mary's.

In the third round of the Hampshire Junior Cup, St. Mary's were drawn to play Fordingbridge Turks on 12 January 1889. Stride and three other St. Mary's players had been selected to play for the Hampshire F.A. against Berks & Bucks on the same day. St. Mary's tried to get the match against the Turks re-arranged but the New Forest club refused. Consequently, St. Mary's withdrew their four players from the county match to play in the cup. The "Saints" won the match (played at the Antelope Ground) 3–2, earning them a semi-final appearance against Cowes. St. Mary's eventually defeated Cowes after three replays, going on to retain the trophy, defeating Christchurch in the final.

In 1891, St. Mary's had a relatively straightforward passage to the final of the Hampshire Junior Cup, where they defeated Lymington 2–0. Having won the cup for three consecutive years, the Saints retained the trophy permanently.

In the following season, St. Mary's entered the Hampshire Senior Cup for the first time and reached the final against the winners of the two previous years, the Royal Engineers based at Aldershot. In the final, played at the County Ground on 14 March 1891, the Saints took an early lead through Ernie Nicholls before the engineers equalised. Two second-half goals, from Frank Bromley and Bob Kiddle, saw St. Mary's claim the senior cup for the first time.

The success in local cup competitions prompted the club committee to enter a national tournament for the first time – in the first qualifying round of the FA Cup on 3 October 1891, they played at Warmley near Bristol, winning comfortably 4–1, with Stride playing at right-half. In the next round, St. Mary's defeated Reading 7–0 but the match was awarded to Reading following an FA enquiry into the eligibility of two St. Mary's players, Jock Fleming and Alexander McMillan. In March 1892, St. Mary's retained the Hampshire Senior Cup, with an easy 5–0 victory over a Medical Staff team.

In 1892–93, Stride played in both FA Cup matches, with the Saints going out 4–0 to Maidenhead, and in all three Hampshire Senior Cup matches, losing 1–2 to Freemantle in the final, in which Stride gave away a penalty for tripping Freemantle's forward, Horton.

Stride did not play in the FA Cup matches in 1893–94, but did play in the later rounds of the Hampshire Senior Cup, when St. Mary's reached the final in March 1894, when they were defeated 1–0 by the Royal Engineers.

In 1894, St. Mary's were founder members of the Southern League. Not wanting to commit to regular league football, Stride decided to retire from the club.

Following his retirement from football, Stride continued to work in Southampton and was employed in the Borough Engineers department.
