= Jack Dollin =

English footballer

Personal information
- Full name: Albert Edwin Dollin
- Date of birth: 1866
- Place of birth: Southampton, England
- Date of death: 22 April 1955 (aged 88–89)
- Place of death: Southampton, England
- Position: Outside forward

Senior career*
Years	Team	Apps	(Gls)
- Freemantle
1892–1893	Southampton St. Mary's	0	(0)
1893–189?	Freemantle		
- Eastleigh Athletic
- * Club domestic league appearances and goals

Albert Edwin "Jack" Dollin (1866 – 22 April 1955) was an English professional footballer who played for Southampton St. Mary's in 1892–93, making two appearances in FA Cup matches. He was Southampton's first player signed as a professional.

== Football career ==
Dollin was born in Southampton and had started his football career with Freemantle. In the close season of 1892, he joined Southampton St. Mary's. At the time of his signing, the club made no announcement about his professional status and this was kept secret for several years, probably to avoid the club being ostracised by other clubs. Speaking in 1948, Dollin revealed that he had been "paid £1 a week and found a job".

Described as a "versatile" player who could be "unpredictable in front of goal", Dollin played at outside-left in the qualifying matches in the 1892–93 FA Cup, defeating Newbury 4–1 (with three goals from Bob Kiddle) before crashing out with a 4–0 defeat against Maidenhead on 29 October 1892.

In the Hampshire Senior Cup, Dollin scored in 2–0 wins over the Royal Engineers from Aldershot and a side from Portsmouth, helping the "Saints" to reach the final against Dollin's former side, Freemantle. In the final, Freemantle took an early lead before Dollin equalised. With the score 1–1 and only a few minutes left to play, a Freemantle forward, Horton, was about to score past Ralph Ruffell in the Saints' goal when he was tripped by William Stride. Although the Saints protested that the foul was outside the penalty area, the referee awarded a penalty to Freemantle, which was converted by Shirley Hawkins, thus preventing St. Mary's from claiming the trophy for the third consecutive year.

By the end of the season, Dollin had suffered injuries to both knees and decided to revert to amateur status and returned to Freemantle. He later joined Eastleigh Athletic for whom he played until the mid-1900s.
