= George Marshall (footballer, born 1869) =

English footballer and cricketer

Personal information
- Date of birth: 8 July 1869
- Place of birth: Southampton, England
- Date of death: December 1938 (aged 69)
- Place of death: Southampton, England
- Position: Defender

Youth career
- 1888–1891: St. Mary's

Senior career*
Years	Team	Apps	(Gls)
1891–1896	Southampton St. Mary's	22	(0)
- * Club domestic league appearances and goals

George Marshall (8 July 1869 – December 1938) was an English amateur footballer who played in defence for Southampton St. Mary's in the 1890s. He was the only player to appear in both Southampton's first-ever FA Cup match and first-ever League match. Described as a "sturdy, reliable defender", he was equally at home at either full-back or half-back.

Marshall was also a cricketer with Hampshire.

== Football career ==
Marshall was born in Southampton and played rugby in his youth before converting to "soccer", joining the newly formed St. Mary's Football Club in 1888. He made his first competitive appearance for St. Mary's in 1891, helping the club to win the Hampshire Senior Cup, defeating a team from the Royal Engineers, Aldershot 3–1 at the County Ground.

The following season, the "Saints" entered the FA Cup for the first time, being drawn away to Warmley (near Bristol) in the first qualifying round where they won comfortably 4–1, with Marshall playing at right-back. Although the Saints defeated Reading 7–0 in the next round, they were subsequently disqualified for fielding two ineligible players. Despite the disappointment of the FA Cup exit, Marshall once again helped the team to claim the Hampshire Senior Cup in March 1892, and was called up to play for Hampshire.

In each of the next two seasons, the Saints were defeated in the second qualifying round of the FA Cup, going down 4–0 to Maidenhead United at the Antelope Ground in October 1892 and 2–1 at Reading in November 1893.

In 1894, Southampton were one of the nine founder members of the Southern League, which had been created to enable clubs in southern England, who were not admitted to the Football League to play competitive football on a regular basis. Marshall played in all but two of the League matches in the inaugural season, at right-back with Bill Jeffrey alongside him on the left. At the end of the season, the Saints were in third place in the league, behind Millwall Athletic and Luton Town. Marshall also played in all five matches in the FA Cup, where they reached the First round proper for the first time, going down 4–1 to Nottingham Forest of the First Division with two goals from Thomas Rose.

At the start of the following season, Marshall was moved forward to left-half although he missed several matches through injury, making only eight league appearances. Having played in every FA Cup match since the Saints first entered in 1891, Marshall missed the match at home to Reading on 23 November 1895, when he was replaced by Joe Rogers. Although Marshall regained his place for the next round, he was again not selected for the First round proper match against The Wednesday, with John Hodgkinson taking over, as the Saints went down 3–2.

In the summer of 1896, as a result of his injuries, Marshall retired from football to concentrate on his career with the Ordnance Survey. In his six seasons with Southampton, he made a total of 36 appearances in the Southern League or FA Cup, plus many more in friendlies and local cup competitions.

== Cricket career ==
Marshall was also an occasional cricketer and made one first-eleven appearance for Hampshire against the Marylebone Cricket Club (MCC) in June 1894, when he scored a total of five runs.

He later went to stand as an umpire at the County Ground.
