= Sandy McMillan =

Scottish soldier and footballer

Personal information
- Full name: John McMillan
- Date of birth: 1869
- Date of death: 27 March 1892 (aged 22–23)
- Place of death: Umballa, British India
- Position: Centre-half

Senior career*
Years	Team	Apps	(Gls)
- 93rd Argyll and Sutherland Highlanders
1891	Southampton St. Mary's	0	(0)
- * Club domestic league appearances and goals

Sgt. John "Sandy" McMillan (1869–1892) was a Scottish soldier who made one appearance at centre-half in the FA Cup for Southampton St. Mary's Football Club in 1891.

== Football career ==
McMillan was a member of the 93rd Argyll and Sutherland Highlanders who played a friendly football match against St. Mary's at the County Ground, Southampton on 10 October 1891. The Highlanders won the match 2–0 and afterwards, the "Saints" promptly signed McMillan and his team-mate Private Jock Fleming.

The Saints' next fixture was an FA Cup Second Qualifying Round match against Reading to be played at the Antelope Ground two weeks later. Prior to the cup match, the local press reported that both McMillan and Fleming "had been a Saint for over a year". The FA Cup match ended in a 7–0 victory to the "Saints", in which Fleming scored a hat-trick. At the reception after the match, the Reading secretary asked for, and received, an advance of £3 on the share of the gate money. With this he immediately sent a telegram of protest accompanied by the necessary fee of 2 guineas to the Football Association (FA) claiming that the Saints had fielded illegally registered players in Fleming and McMillan. The claim was upheld by the FA, who found that the players had not been registered at least 28 days before the match, and as the Saints had not complied with the requirements of Rule 5 they were thus expelled from the competition.

== Later career ==
Unlike Fleming, who went on to have a career in The Football League, McMillan immediately returned to his regiment and shortly afterwards was posted to India, based at Umballa, where he died the following year of enteric fever.
