= Antelope Ground =

Sports ground

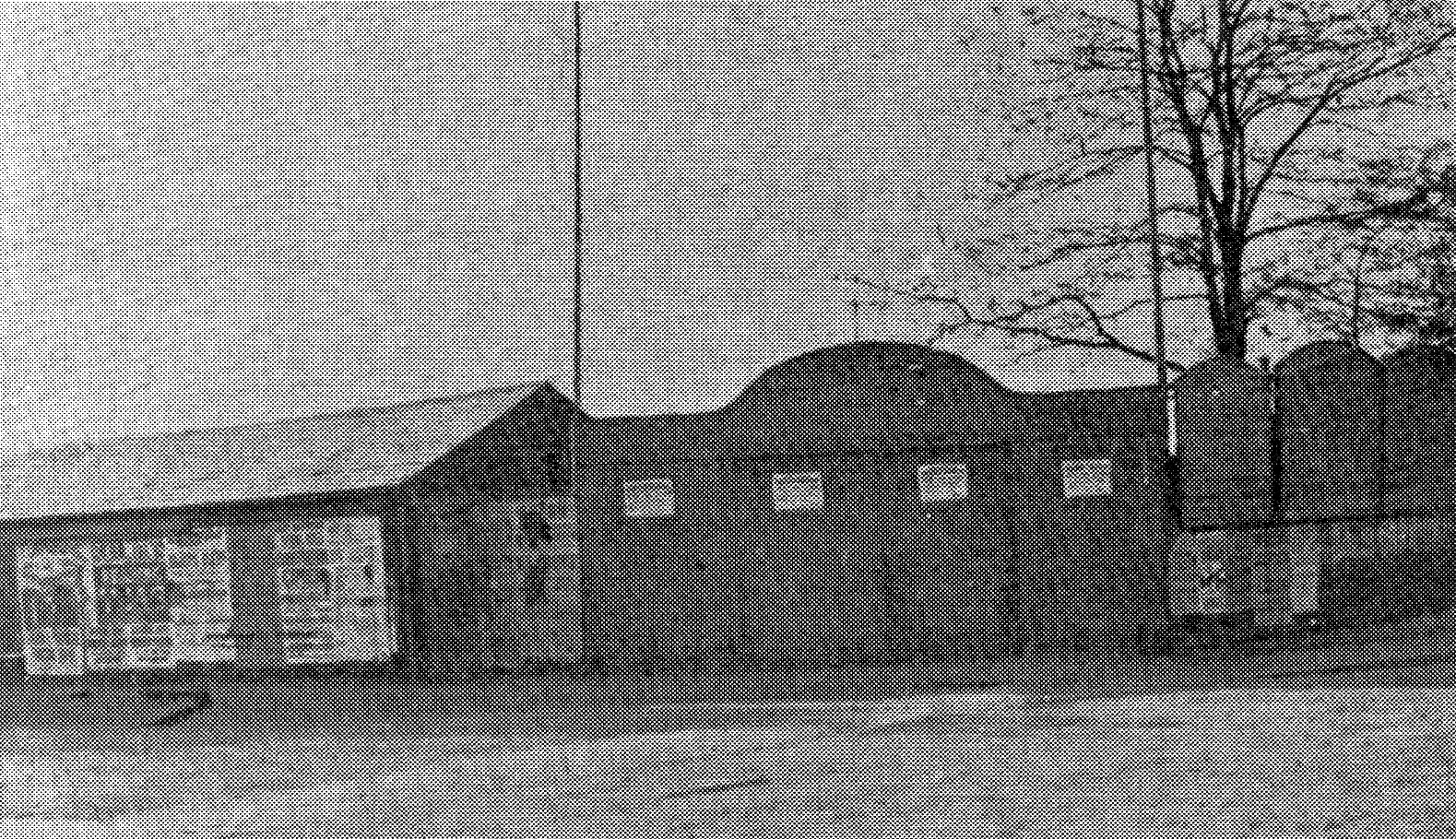
- Entrance to the Antelope Ground
- Interactive map of Antelope Ground
- Full name: Antelope Ground
- Former names: Day's Ground
- Location: St Mary's, Southampton, England
- Coordinates: 50°54′43″N 1°23′59″W
- Owner: St. Mary's Church, Southampton
- Operator: Daniel Day
- Capacity: c.12,000

Construction
- Opened: pre-1839
- Closed: 1896

Tenants
- Hampshire County Cricket Club (1842–1845 & 1864–1884); Southampton St. Mary's F.C. (1887–1896)

The Antelope Ground, Southampton was a sports ground that was the first home of both Hampshire County Cricket Club, who played there prior to 1884, and of Southampton Football Club, who played there from 1887 to 1896 as "Southampton St. Mary's F.C."

The ground was situated on the east side of St Mary's Road at the corner of the present-day Brinton's Terrace and extended south to Clovelly Road and east to Exmoor Road. The ground took its name from the Antelope Hotel, which was situated on the opposite side of St Mary's Road.

== Hampshire County Cricket Club ==
=== 1842 to 1845 ===
The first known cricket match played at the ground was on 23 August 1839 when "North of Hampshire" opposed "South of Hampshire".

In 1842 three local gentlemen, Thomas Chamberlayne, Sir Frederick Hervey-Bathurst and Sir John Barker-Mill, financed the development of the ground and installed the former Hampshire and Surrey cricketer Daniel Day in the Antelope Hotel. Chamberlayne was a Hampshire cricketer, making several appearances in the 1840s, including in the Hampshire v. England match in September 1842. Hervey-Bathurst also played regularly for MCC and Hampshire between 1832 and 1861. All three gentlemen are shown on the scorecard of a match between MCC and Hampshire at Lord's on 30 June 1842, although Barker-Mill is shown as "absent hurt".

During the period when the ground was under the supervision of Daniel Day the ground was known as "Day's Ground" rather than the Antelope. Five first-class matches were played there between 1842 and 1845. The first was in September 1842, when Hampshire played England. This was a low-scoring match with Hampshire being bowled out for 67 in the first innings; England replied with a total of 99, but Hampshire only managed 27 in their second innings and England thus won by an innings and 5 runs. England's best bowler was William Hillyer who took 15 wickets in the match.

In 1845, the ground was first threatened by building speculation, resulting in Daniel Day moving to a ground at the Woolston Hotel on the south side of Woolston Road, Itchen, a few hundred yards across the River Itchen from Southampton. First-class matches in Southampton were then played on what was known as "Day's Itchen Ground".

The building development fell through and the lease of the Antelope Ground was taken by a Mr. Brooks (or Brooke), with cricket matches involving the "Gentlemen of South Hampshire" being staged there.

In 1861 James Southerton, the Surrey cricketer was engaged at Southampton and resided at the Antelope Ground. He remained there until 1867. The first recorded individual century made on the ground was in 1862, when George Ede hit 122 for South Hampshire v East Hampshire.

=== 1863 to 1884 ===
On 11 September 1863, at a meeting held at the Antelope Hotel, Hampshire County Cricket Club was re-formed, following which top-class cricket returned to the Antelope, with the County Club renting the ground from 1864 on a yearly basis.

The first county match at the ground following the revival of the club was against Sussex starting on 7 July 1864, which Sussex won by 10 wickets with James Lillywhite claiming ten wickets in the match for 80 runs, including taking his 100th wicket in first-class matches.

Over the next twenty years, 27 first-class matches were played at the Antelope Ground as well as regular matches involving the "Gentlemen of Hampshire".

The best bowling figures were in a match against Derbyshire in July 1876 when Derbyshire's William Mycroft claimed 17–103 in the match. Despite this, Hampshire won a low-scoring match by one wicket.

Francis Lacey claimed the highest individual score at the ground, with 211 in the first innings against Kent in June 1884, which he followed with 92 not out in the second, as Hampshire won by 3 wickets. This was Lacey's top score in first-class matches.

The last recorded match at the ground was between Hampshire and Somerset in August 1884, when a total of 645 runs were scored, with Ernest Powell and Francis Lacey scoring 140 and 100 respectively in Hampshire's first innings. Hampshire won the match by an innings and 169 runs.

In 1883, Col. James Fellowes opened negotiations for the lease and development of land in Northlands Road, Southampton (part of the Hulse Estate) and by the Annual General Meeting of Hampshire County Cricket Club, held at the George Hotel, Winchester in January 1884, Col. Fellowes was able to report that 8 acres (32,000 m^{2}) of land had been leased at an annual rent of £160 on condition that the club erected a pavilion. The new lease was to run for 28 years. The first match played at the new County Ground was on 9 May 1885.

== Southampton St. Mary's Football Club ==
=== Formation to 1891 ===
Southampton St. Mary's F.C. was founded officially in 1885, although the club's history can be traced back to 1878 with the foundation of "Southampton Rangers" by shipbuilders working for Oswald & Mordaunt (later Vosper Thornycroft). The first match played under the name of "St. Mary's" was on 21 November 1885, on the "backfield" of the County Ground in Northlands Road. The match was against a team from Freemantle, who were defeated 5–1. Over the next two years, the "Saints" played their home matches on Southampton Common near the Cowherds pub. In 1887, the Hampshire Football Association was founded and immediately established the Hampshire Senior and Junior Cup competitions, with St. Mary's entering the Senior Cup. On 26 November 1887, the Saints played their first-ever cup tie away to Totton, played at Testwood.

In the next round, the Saints were drawn at home to play Petersfield on 17 December 1887. As Southampton Common was not suitable for a cup-tie, the St Mary's committee secured the use of the Antelope Ground, "by kind permission of the Pirates". The Pirates were a rugby club who shared the ground with Woolston Works F.C. Petersfield could only field ten men, and the Saints won 10–0. In the next round, the Saints received another home draw, this time against Lymington; the Pirates already had a fixture on the date of the match, 21 January 1888, so the match was played on the pitch at the Anchor Hotel, Redbridge, just within the town boundary. The match was won 4–0, but some of the Saints' fans misbehaved; their "hilarious" behaviour was such that the owner of the ground demanded that the gate receipts should be paid to the Royal South Hants Hospital. The remaining matches in the cup were all played at the County Ground, with the Saints defeating the Southampton Harriers 2–1 in the final after a replay.

The next recorded match at the Antelope Ground was on 14 April 1888, when St. Mary's lost 3–0 to Woolston Works in an end-of-season friendly. During the summer of 1888, the Saints committee endeavoured to find a more suitable permanent location than the common. An application to play on Hoglands Park was refused by the town council. With pitches at the County Ground and the Antelope costing between £2.10s and £3 to rent (necessitating an attendance of 240 at 3d each to break even) the club were in great need of a permanent home.

For the 1888–89 season, the Saints continued to play most of their home matches on the common, although some more prestigious friendly matches were played at the County Ground. After a 5–0 victory in the Hampshire Junior Cup first round over Havant at the Antelope Ground in November and a bye in the second, the third round draw gave the Saints a home match with the Fordingbridge Turks. The match was scheduled for 12 January when the Saints had four players (including captain George Carter) selected for a Hampshire FA game; the Saints' tried to have the cup game rescheduled but the Turks refused. On the morning of the game, no venue had been arranged but an agreement was reached with the Woolston Works side, who were now tenants at the Antelope Ground, to use their facilities. The Saints won 3–2 earning them a semi-final appearance against Cowes, which the Saints eventually won after a third replay. The final against Christchurch was played at Bar End, Winchester with the Saints winning 3–0. The crowd at the County Ground for the third replay was reported to be in excess of 5,000, although the actual crowd was probably less than half this, but nonetheless the level of support demonstrated that football had now become well-established in the eyes of the Southampton public.

In the summer of 1889, the Woolston Works team folded leaving it clear for the Saints to claim the Antelope Ground as their home base, with the Trojans Rugby Club as joint tenants. Having obtained a permanent home, St. Mary's could now claim to be the premier club in the town, although Freemantle would continue to contest this claim, despite having a much poorer record in the local cups.

For the 1889–90 season, St. Mary's played their friendly matches at the Antelope Ground as well as a third-round match in the Hampshire Junior Cup, but the semi-final and final of the cup were played at the County Ground, with the Saints defeating Lymington 2–0 in the final, thus winning the tournament for the third consecutive year, enabling them to retain the cup outright. The crowd at the County Ground was estimated at 2,800 and the gate money (£51 3s 6d) was reported to be "the largest ever taken in the two counties (Hampshire and Dorset) and beats the big "gate" at the Cowes match last year".

In the following year, the Saints continued to arrange friendly matches at the Antelope Ground inviting teams from further afield, suffering defeats against teams such as Reading and Swindon Town. Having won the Junior Cup outright, they now entered the Hampshire Senior Cup defeating Geneva Cross from Netley Hospital 5–0 at the Antelope Ground, before playing the semi-final and final at the County Ground where, on 14 March 1891, they defeated a side from the Royal Engineers, Aldershot 3–1 in front of a crowd numbering between 3,000 and 4,000 with a "gate" of £63. The season ended with the St Mary's club having a membership of 400 and a bank balance of over £100.

=== 1891 to 1894 (Entering the FA Cup) ===
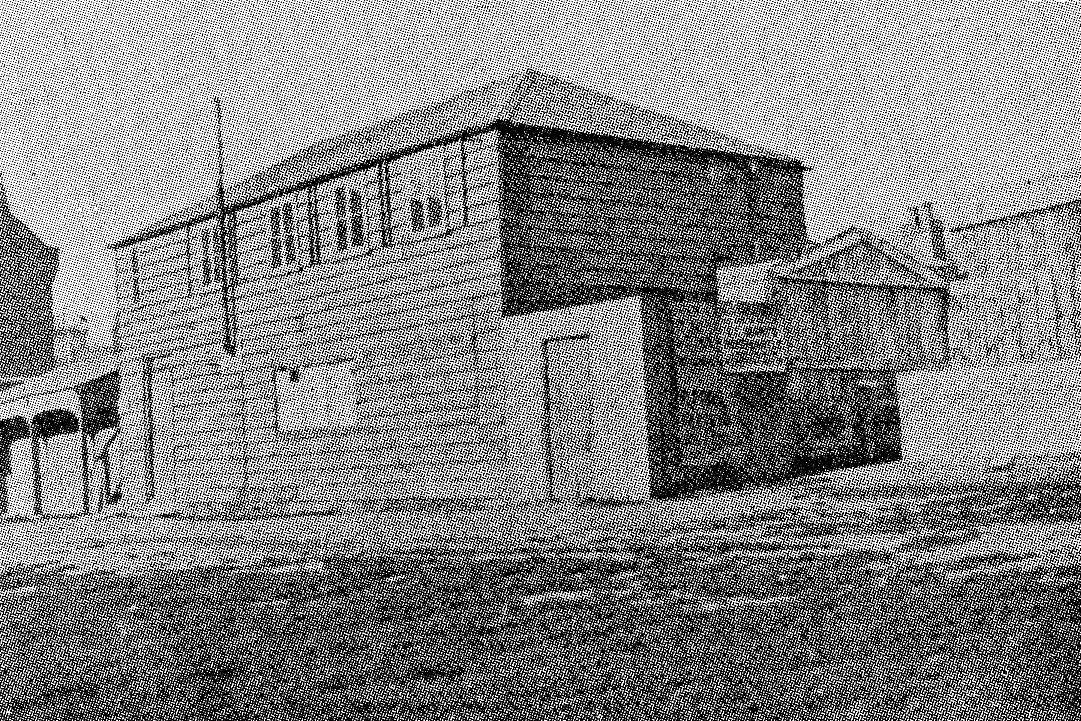
The players' dressing room at the Antelope Ground

The success in local cup competitions prompted the club committee to enter a national tournament for the first time – in the first qualifying round of the FA Cup they played at Warmley near Bristol winning comfortably 4–1. The draw for the next round was a home match against Reading to be played on 24 October 1891. Two weeks before the tie at the Antelope Ground, the Saints arranged a friendly against the 93rd Argyll and Sutherland Highlanders, after which two members of the Highlanders side, Jock Fleming and Sandy McMillan, were signed by the Saints.

For the first FA Cup match to be staged in Southampton, the St Mary's committee "pulled out all the stops" to make sure that the Antelope Ground met the standards expected of a venue for the country's top football tournament, although the local press complained of the poor facilities, not having a covered press box, and there were problems with the pitch markings. The crowd (estimated at 4,000) watched the match from behind a rope around the perimeter of the pitch. The walls and banks around the ground were crowded with spectators trying to get a better view, as were the windows of neighbouring houses. They were entertained with a 7–0 victory, with Fleming getting a hat-trick. At the reception after the match, the Reading secretary asked for, and received, an advance of £3 on the share of the gate money. With this he immediately sent a telegram of protest accompanied by the necessary fee of 2 guineas to the Football Association (FA) claiming that the Saints had fielded illegally registered players in Fleming and McMillan. The claim was upheld by the FA, who found that the players had not been registered at least 28 days before the match, and as the Saints had not complied with the requirements of Rule 5 they were thus expelled from the competition.

In 1892–93, the Saints defeated Newbury 4–1 (with a hat-trick from Bob Kiddle) in the first qualifying round played at the Antelope Ground. In the second qualifying round they played Maidenhead at the Antelope Ground on 29 October 1892 and suffered a 4–0 defeat – apart from the Hampshire County Cricket Club Charity Cup the previous April, this was the Saints first defeat in a cup match. Shortly before this match, the Saints had signed their first professional player, Jack Dollin, who was paid a "pound a week and given a job in the week", although his professional status was not revealed publicly at the time. Dollin only remained with the Saints until the end of the season, before knee injuries caused him to revert to amateur status.

Before the start of the 1893–94 season, the Saints signed further players on professional terms, including Jack Angus and Harry Offer, who had previously played for Ardwick (later Manchester City) and Royal Arsenal respectively. In the FA Cup, Uxbridge were defeated 3–1 at the Antelope Ground, before a defeat at Reading in the next round. In the local cups, the Saints were defeated 1–0 by the Royal Engineers (Aldershot) in the final (with Angus being sent off), played at the County Ground, but did gain revenge by winning the Hampshire County Cricket Club Charity Cup 5–0 a few weeks later.

During the 1893–94 season, the Saints arranged a match under "Well's Patent" lights, but it was called off due to bad weather; it would be another 60 years before Southampton played their first match under floodlights. At the end of the season, the Saints were able to report a "profit" of over £85 – gate receipts and subscriptions had produced income of £768, with expenses of £683 including wages of £221 and rent for the Antelope Ground of £42.

In June 1894, St. Mary's Church, who owned the freehold of the ground, were short of funds and decided that the Antelope Ground should be sold. They offered it to the Town Council for £5,000 but this was declined. There was a brief half-hearted campaign to persuade the Saints to purchase the freehold, but the club could not afford it but instead considered a permanent move to the County Ground. Ultimately, this all came to nothing and the Saints remained at the Antelope Ground for the start of the next, historic season.

=== 1894 to 1896 (The Southern League) ===
In 1894, Southampton St Mary's were one of the nine founder members of the Southern League, which had been created to enable clubs in southern England who were not admitted to the Football League, to play competitive football on a regular basis. For the start of their League career, Saints signed several new players on professional contracts, including Charles Baker, Alf Littlehales and Lachie Thomson from Stoke and Fred Hollands from Millwall.

Saints' first league match was played at the Antelope Ground on 6 October 1894 in front of a crowd estimated at between 4,000 and 5,000, who paid 6d each for admittance; Harry Offer, Jack Angus and Fred Hollands scored in a 3–1 victory over Chatham. During the match, Chatham's centre-forward, Gamble, was sent-off for making "uncomplimentary" comments to the referee following Southampton's second goal, for which he claimed the ball had been "carried right into goal on one of the player's arms".

The Saints' first defeat at the Antelope Ground came against Luton on 22 December (2–1), whilst their best result was a 7–1 victory over Swindon Town on 30 March, with two goals each from Jack Angus and Herbert Ward. Saints finished their inaugural league season in third place, behind Millwall and Luton Town.

In the FA Cup, Southampton met Newbury on 13 October 1894 in the first qualifying round at the Antelope Ground. Saints were "in particularly rampant mood" and won 14–0, with hat-tricks from Herbert Ward and Arthur Nineham; this is still Southampton's biggest victory in a competitive match. They had easy victories in the next three rounds, defeating Reading 5–2, Marlow 7–3 and Warmley 5–1, with all four qualifying matches being played at the Antelope Ground. This meant that the Saints went into the draw for the First round proper for the first time, from which they received yet another home tie, against Nottingham Forest of the First Division.

The match against Nottingham Forest was played at the Antelope Ground on 2 February 1895. On the day of the match, the pitch was covered with three inches (76 mm) of snow. After a long delay, while the referee assessed whether or not the frozen ground was fit to play on, the crowd (estimated at 7,000) were admitted. By this time a grandstand had been erected at the ground, for which spectators were charged admission of 1s 6d, compared to the standing spectators for whom the admission was still 6d. The Nottingham Forest players complained about the spartan state of the changing accommodation, demanding an oil stove, before the match eventually kicked off. Despite scoring 31 goals in the qualifying stages, the Saints were no match for the "skill, subtlety and cohesion" of their opponents who ran out 4–1 victors, with two goals from Thomas Rose. The local press blamed the defeat on the failure of the Southampton players to train adequately and also suggested that the "more northerly visitors were more accustomed to the Arctic conditions".

Shortly before the FA Cup exit, the Saints had entertained a team from the Wiltshire Regiment, winning 13–0 on a "quagmire of a pitch" at the Antelope Ground, with Joe Rogers scoring ten goals.

For the Saints' second season in the Southern League, they remained at the Antelope Ground, with the league season following a similar pattern as the previous year, with the Saints finishing third behind Millwall and Luton Town. The highlight of the league season was the visit of Millwall on 21 March 1896 when a crowd of 8,000 saw the Saints defeat the reigning champions 2–0, with goals from Charles Baker and Joe Turner.

Further excitement came in the FA Cup, when an away victory over local rivals Freemantle in the first qualifying round was followed by comfortable home victories over Marlow (5–0), Reading (3–0) and Uxbridge (3–0). In the First round proper, the Saints once again received a home draw against opposition from the Football League First Division, this time in the shape of The Wednesday. Saints' trainer, Bill Dawson, who had moved from Stoke in the summer, spent the week leading up to Wednesday's visit with extra training for the players, taking them through their paces on Shawford Down.

For the match, played at the Antelope Ground on 1 February 1896, the crowd was estimated at 12,000, by far the largest yet recorded for a football match in Southampton. In an effort to avoid the crowd congestion from the previous year, the gates were opened at 1 o'clock. According to the report in one local newspaper, "The Independent", by the time of the kick-off,

"the scene at the ground was a sight for the gods. Thousands lined the ropes and crowded the embankments, and hundreds packed the stands. The enclosure was encircled by a dense and perfect sea of faces. Every coign of vantage had been monopolised, windows and house tops not excepted."

The reporter for "the Echo", writing under the name "Ariel", added:

"All the world and his wife were there, including many of our "city fathers" and grave and reverend seigniors, whose curiosity had been aroused by the chatter that was going on in the town... It was a sight calculated to excite the feelings of the Saintly executive, and make them look as pleased and comfortable as if the very cockles of their hearts were being tickled. A sea of faces ten thousand strong bordered the field of play when ... the referee first tooted the whistle."

Unfortunately, the ground was unable to take such a large crowd. Shortly before the teams ran out onto the pitch, a shed roof collapsed, resulting in injuries to fans who had been inside the shed or perched on top. One spectator, George May, suffered a broken ankle and a Mr. George Bett, who had been inside, suffered serious knee damage that subsequently prevented him from working in his occupation as a carriage maker at the Eastleigh railway works. Bett later unsuccessfully sued the club for damages, his case failing because it was found that the club had declared the shed "out of bounds", although the defendants did agree to help Bett in his hardship.

For the match itself, the Saints had to play their third-choice goalkeeper, Walter Cox as Tom Cain was injured, and the Royal Artillery refused to allow on-loan 'keeper "Gunner" Reilly to play. The Saints took an early lead, through Watty Keay, before two goals from Alec Brady gave Wednesday the half-time lead. Wednesday increased their lead shortly after the break, and although Joe Turner got one back, the Saints were unable to score an equaliser. Wednesday ran out 3–2 winners and went on to win the Cup the following April.

== Closure ==
Although the Saints had previously set up a sub-committee to discuss purchasing the Antelope Ground outright, no agreement could be reached with the freeholders. Following the failure of these negotiations, the church agreed the sale of the site to property developers. On 18 January 1896, the local press reported that contracts had already been drawn up for the sale and that "eligible villa residences" would be built on the ground where "many historic battles" had been fought.

The club, through the connections of their president Dr. H. W. R. Bencraft, who was also Hon. Secretary to Hampshire County Cricket Club, secured the use of the County Ground, at an annual rental of £200.

The last football match played at the Antelope Ground was on the evening of Wednesday 29 April 1896, when a crowd estimated at 3,000 saw the Saints defeat their local rivals Freemantle in a friendly, with the last goal being scored by Southampton-born Fred Hayter.

Southampton Football Club spent the next two seasons as tenants at the County Ground, during both of which they won the Southern League title, before eventually obtaining a permanent home, when they moved to The Dell in 1898.

The Antelope Ground was demolished, with Graham Road being built across the site. Subsequently, a furniture store was built on the corner of Brinton's Terrace and St Mary's Road; Brinton's Terrace is now one of the entrances to the Royal South Hampshire Hospital, while the Antelope Hotel has long since disappeared and an office block, which was for many years occupied by British Gas, now stands on the site.

== See also ==
- List of Hampshire County Cricket Club grounds
- List of cricket grounds in England and Wales

== Bibliography ==
- Bull, David; Brunskell, Bob (2000). Match of the Millennium. Hagiology Publishing. ISBN 0-9534474-1-3.
- Chalk, Gary; Holley, Duncan (1987). Saints – A complete record. Breedon Books. ISBN 0-907969-22-4.
- Collett, Mike (2003). The Complete Record of the FA Cup. Sports Books. ISBN 1-899807-19-5.
- Holley, Duncan; Chalk, Gary (1992). The Alphabet of the Saints. ACL & Polar Publishing. ISBN 0-9514862-3-3.
- Juson, Dave; Bull, David (2001). Full-Time at The Dell. Hagiology Publishing. ISBN 0-9534474-2-1.
