= Jock Fleming =

Scottish footballer

Personal information
- Full name: James John Fleming
- Date of birth: September 1864
- Place of birth: Leith, Scotland
- Date of death: August 1934 (aged 69)
- Position: Centre-forward

Senior career*
Years	Team	Apps	(Gls)
–	Vale of Leven		
–	93rd Argyll and Sutherland Highlanders		
1891	Southampton St. Mary's	0	(0)
1892	Aston Villa	4	(2)
1892–1893	Lincoln City	11	(5)
1893–????	Larkhall Saints		
- * Club domestic league appearances and goals

James John "Jock" Fleming (September 1864 – August 1934) was a Scottish footballer who played at centre-forward for Southampton St. Mary's, Aston Villa and Lincoln City in the 1890s.

== Football career ==
Fleming was born in Leith, near Edinburgh and played for Vale of Leven in the early years of the Scottish Football League before joining the army with the 93rd Argyll and Sutherland Highlanders.

On 10 October 1891, Southampton St. Mary's played an exhibition match against the 93rd Argyll and Sutherland Highlanders' football side at the County Ground, Southampton which was lost 2–0. The St. Mary's management were so impressed by Fleming and his team-mate, Sandy McMillan, that they immediately signed them both in order that they might play in the forthcoming FA Cup match with Reading.

The FA Cup 2nd Qualifying match was played at the Antelope Ground on 24 October, and ended in a 7–0 victory to the "Saints", in which Private Fleming featured strongly with his aggressive style of play earning him a hat-trick. At the reception after the match, the Reading secretary asked for, and received, an advance of £3 on the share of the gate money. With this he immediately sent a telegram of protest accompanied by the necessary fee of 2 guineas to the Football Association claiming that the Saints had fielded illegally registered players in Fleming and McMillan. The claim was upheld by the F.A., who found that the players had not been registered at least 28 days before the match, and as the Saints had not complied with the requirements of Rule 5 they were thus expelled from the competition.

Fleming continued to play for Southampton until the end of December, when he was posted to India with his regiment.

In May 1892, he left the army and returned to England, when he joined Aston Villa of the Football League First Division. He scored twice on his debut in a 4–1 victory over Everton, but only made three further (goal-less) appearances for Villa, before moving to join Lincoln City in October 1892. He made 11 league appearances for Lincoln with five goals before dropping out of professional football and returning to his native Scotland in May 1893.
