= Bob Kiddle =

English footballer (1869–1918)

Personal information
- Full name: Robert Sherran Kiddle
- Date of birth: 10 May 1869
- Place of birth: Southampton, England
- Date of death: 11 May 1918 (aged 49)
- Place of death: Salisbury, England
- Position: Forward

Youth career
- Southampton Harriers

Senior career*
| Years | Team | Apps | (Gls) |
| 1889–1895 | Southampton St. Mary's | 1 | (0) |
- * Club domestic league appearances and goals

Robert Sherran Kiddle (10 May 1869 – 11 May 1918) was an English amateur footballer who played as an inside-forward for Southampton St. Mary's in the 1890s.

== Football career ==
Kiddle was born in Southampton and had achieved distinction as a track athlete in his youth. He played football for Southampton Harriers before being recruited to the newly formed Southampton St. Mary's club in 1889. In his first few seasons at the Antelope Ground, he was restricted to friendly matches and local cup tournaments, including winning the Hampshire Junior Cup in 1890 and the Hampshire Senior Cup in each of the following two seasons.

In 1891, "the Saints" made their first appearance in the FA Cup, with Kiddle making "good use of his athletic skills to outpace his opponents" as Southampton defeated Warmley 4–1 in the first qualifying round, before meeting Reading. The match concluded with a 7–0 victory for Southampton, but afterwards, Reading lodged a protest over the ineligibility of two players, Jock Fleming and Sandy McMillan, and consequently Southampton were expelled from the competition.

In 1892–93, Kiddle scored a hat-trick as the Saints defeated Newbury 4–1 in the first qualifying round played at the Antelope Ground. In the second qualifying round, they played Maidenhead United at the Antelope Ground on 29 October 1892 and suffered a 4–0 defeat — apart from the Hampshire County Cricket Club Charity Cup the previous April, this was the Saints' first defeat in a cup match. Kiddle's final FA Cup appearance came in November 1894, when they lost 2–1 at Reading.

Although Southampton were one of the founding members of the Southern League in 1894, it was not until 19 October 1895 that Kiddle made his solitary league appearance, taking the place of Willie Naughton as the Saints crashed 7–3 at Clapton. Kiddle was now past his prime and retired shortly afterwards.

== Career outside football ==
Kiddle was employed as a clerk in Southampton and was later a fish merchant in Commercial Road, All Saints, Southampton. During World War I, he was a canteen manager.

His two sons, Russell Sherran Kiddle and Robert Montague Kiddle, were both reserve team players for Southampton in 1919. His brother, Edward, played for Southampton in 1894, including winning the Hampshire Junior Cup.
