= Freemantle F.C. =

Freemantle
- Freemantle in 1893
- Full name: Freemantle Football Club
- Nickname: The Magpies
- Founded: 1884; 142 years ago
- Dissolved: 1905; 121 years ago
- Ground: Civil Service Sports Ground
Home colours

Freemantle Football Club was a football club based in the Freemantle area of Southampton. They were active for 21 years and were one of the early leading pioneers of football in Hampshire. During their brief heyday, at the end of the nineteenth century, they were arch rivals to Southampton F.C.

== History ==
=== Early days ===
The "Magpies", as Freemantle were known, were formed in 1884 and appear to have had strong links with Christ Church, Freemantle; one of the parish's curates, Rev. George D'Arcy, featured in their ranks in their formative days. In early editions of the Hampshire F.A. Handbook, their headquarters were recorded as the Waterloo Arms, the pub next door to the church.

On 21 November 1885, Freemantle played a team from St. Mary's Young Men's Association on the "backfield" of the County Ground in Northlands Road, where the Hampshire Bowling Club was later established. This was the first of many local "derbies" against the "Saints", who ran out as 5–1 victors. The two clubs played a return match the following January, again on the County Ground, which St. Mary's won 1–0.

In 1888, Freemantle took a lease on a new ground off Shirley Road from the Atherley family, where the club remained until their demise 17 years later. The ground later became the Civil Service Sports Ground.

In August 1892, St. Mary's were looking to sign new players to strengthen their team; after a failed attempt to sign George Ridges from Freemantle, they succeeded in luring Jack Dollin across Hill Lane, who thus became the "Saints" first professional player. Dollin was paid £1 per week and found a job, although his status as a professional was kept a secret for a number of years. Dollin only remained with the Saints until the end of the season, before knee injuries caused him to revert to amateur status, rejoining Freemantle. Ridges did make one appearance for St. Mary's, when he played on loan in the second qualifying round of the FA Cup against Maidenhead on 29 October 1892. The match was played at the Antelope Ground and ended 4–0 to the visitors, with F.W. Janes scoring a hat-trick – this was St. Mary's first defeat in a cup competition since their foundation seven years earlier. Shortly after the FA Cup match, St. Mary's and Freemantle met in a friendly, with the match ending 3–3.

In March 1893, Freemantle reached the final of the Hampshire Senior Cup, where they again met their arch-rivals, Southampton St. Mary's. The Saints had won the cup in each of the two previous seasons and were favourites to retain the trophy. The match, played at the County Ground on 11 March, generated great excitement in the town and produced a crowd of over 6,000 and gate receipts of £122. The Bournemouth Guardian reported: "the attendance completely upset all ideas as to the accommodation that would be required, and the magnificent spectacle of between 6,000 and 7,000 excited individuals massed together round the field of play ... was one that Hampshire and indeed none of the counties south of the Thames and this side of London has ever witnessed at an Association football match." Freemantle opened the scoring before the Saints equalised through former Freemantle player, Jack Dollin; with the score 1–1 and only a few minutes left to play, a Freemantle forward, Horton, was about to score past Ralph Ruffell in the Saints' goal when he was tripped by William Stride. Although the Saints protested that the foul was outside the penalty area, the referee awarded a penalty to Freemantle, which was converted by Shirley Hawkins, giving Freemantle their first trophy.

After the match, the Freemantle supporters "went on a revel"; local legend has it that the Cup was found next early the morning "sitting unattended in the middle of the road outside a local hostelry – presumably the Waterloo Arms". At the club's end of season dinner the Magpies' captain, George Ridges, told the gathering that he "did not see why they should not call their club Southampton Football Club".

Freemantle and Southampton St. Mary's next cup meeting was in the semi-final of the Hampshire Senior Cup on 24 February 1894, when the Saints gained their revenge for the previous season's defeat, with a 2–1 victory in a replay (despite having Jack Angus sent off for an "over zealous" tackle) after a 1–1 draw in the first match, with both matches played at the County Ground.

By the end of the 1893–94 season, there were rumours in the local press that Charlie Miller, who was a boarder at Millbrook School, would play for Freemantle in the following season – in the event, he left England during the summer to return to Brazil, where he was later to become the "father" of Brazilian football.

The next recorded meeting between the two rivals came in the first qualifying round of the FA Cup on 12 October 1895. By now, Southampton St. Mary's had embarked on their second season in the Southern League, but Freemantle were still restricted to friendlies and cup matches. This match, played at the Freemantle ground, was the club's biggest match for 18 months. According to the local press, "A great day it is in the history of Freemantle, to be sure, to have an English Cup tie played on their own midden, and with the Southampton St. Mary's men too". Sixty seats in the grandstand were reserved for the price of two shillings (10 pence) and a platform was built around the pitch to accommodate the extra spectators, with the ground being raised at one end to make it more level. The official attendance is recorded as 5,354, although the Echo claimed that the crowd was in the region of 6,000 who "were all able to get a good view of the game".

The Saints showed their superiority with a 5–1 victory, with goals from Jack Farrell (2), Alf Littlehales and Willie Naughton, all of whom had joined the club from Stoke, and Joe Turner, another summer recruit from Staffordshire.

=== Southern League ===
In 1896, Freemantle were one of eight clubs who were elected to join an expanded Southern League Second Division. In their first season in league football, they acquitted themselves well, finishing third in the table, winning twelve and drawing four of the 24 games played. This earned them a test match against Northfleet who had finished ninth in the eleven team First Division, in which Southampton St. Mary's were champions for the first time. The Magpies won the test match 3–0 at Millwall's East Ferry Road ground on 1 May 1897. After the game, Northfleet lodged a protest concerning the legality of one of Freemantle's player's, Phillips, who played most of his football with Royal Artillery Portsmouth. A week later, a meeting of the Southern League found that Phillips had signed Southern League forms for both Northfleet and Freemantle; although he had already played for Freemantle and had made no appearances for Northfleet, his transfer had never been applied for. The committee ruled that Freemantle be deducted two points, dropping them to fourth and that both sides involved in the test match should remain in their original divisions.

The decision to nullify their First Division status threw Freemantle into a state of crisis, with both the club secretary and treasurer resigning. At the 1897 A.G.M. it was revealed that the club was in debt by over £200, and plans to incorporate the club into a limited company were abandoned. At the A.G.M., the chairman produced a pamphlet proposing a merger with St. Mary's; although some club members objected to the proposal being discussed in the absence of the club president, Tankerville Chamberlayne (Member of Parliament for Southampton), it was agreed to meet with St. Mary's to discuss the proposals.

The proposal was to create a new club, with a new name, which would have been based at the Freemantle Ground with the St Mary's members having two-thirds of the votes. As the Saints were still tenants at the County Cricket Ground, at the cost of £200 per season, while Freemantle were paying £28 to the Atherley Estate, which was met by a donation from Chamberlayne, the proposal was seriously considered by St. Mary's. The local newspaper, The Echo also took the proposal seriously, commenting on 24 May: "the general opinion (is) that a united club would be better than carrying on two professional clubs in opposition". After much deliberation the St Mary's committee decided not to proceed, and on 11 June the A.G.M. of St. Mary's agreed to reconstitute the club as a limited liability company. The members were also informed that "the committee had a ground in view". The ground, it emerged, was an abandoned, partly excavated, railway cutting known as "the dell".

Freemantle failed to take their place in the Southern League Second Division for the 1897–98 season, which caused the promotion of Royal Artillery Portsmouth into the Southern League to fill the vacancy. But in 1898, following a re-organisation of the League, Freemantle joined the newly formed Division Two South-West. Freemantle finished the 1898–99 season third in the table (out of six clubs who completed all their fixtures) with five victories and five defeats. At the end of the season, the League reverted to two divisions and most of the South-West division clubs, including Freemantle, left.

The club continued to play in the Hampshire League (a competition they had joined as founder members in 1896) and enter the national cup competitions. There was a memorable FA Cup run during the 1903/04 campaign, when they progressed through several rounds to earn an away draw against Plymouth Argyle which they lost 1-5. However, despite this, the club disbanded at the end of the following season, by which time their arch-rivals had won the Southern League title six times and had reached two FA Cup finals.

There have since been a number of clubs playing as Freemantle in the local Southampton League, but these have mostly been short-lived and unable to emulate the success of the original incarnation.

== Colours ==
The club's colours were black and white, in varying designs. Until 1897, the shirts were made up of black and white stripes, and that season changed to diagonal halves. Later the design changed to more regular vertical halves.

== Notable players ==
Several players started their careers at Freemantle before joining Southampton, some of whom subsequently had long careers elsewhere.

Most prominent amongst these was goalkeeper Harry Moger who joined Freemantle as a teenager in 1898, before moving to Southampton in 1900. After three years at The Dell, Moger joined Manchester United in 1903, going on to make over 250 appearances, and helping United to the Football League titles in 1907–08 and 1910–11, and the FA Cup in 1909.

Albert Hoskins started his career at Freemantle before joining the Saints in 1904. He later played for Wolverhampton Wanderers, before becoming manager at Wolves, and later at Gillingham and Torquay United.

Another goalkeeper, Irish international Matt Reilly played on loan at Freemantle in 1896 before helping Portsmouth to the Southern League title in 1901–02. He was also a member of the Royal Artillery team that were runners-up in the FA Amateur Cup in 1896 and Southern League Division Two champions in 1897–98 and was later part of the Shelbourne team who were Irish Cup runners-up in 1908.

Other players who started their careers at Freemantle include Frank Englefield, James McKie and Henry Small, while Sid Cavendish, Joe French, Ernest Gill and Ernie Taylor all played for Freemantle at some time in their careers.

== Honours ==
- Hampshire Senior Cup winners: 1892/93

== Playing Records ==
=== League ===
Season	Division	Position	Significant events
1896/97	Southern League Division 2	3/13	Left competition
	Hampshire League	3/8	Founder Members
1897/98	Hampshire League	5/8	
1898/99	Southern League Division 2 South & West Section	3/6	Left competition
	Hampshire League	4/8	
1899/1900	Hampshire League	4/8	Left competition
1900/01			
1901/02	Hampshire League	5/7	
1902/03	Hampshire League	4/8	Re-organisation
1903/04	Hampshire League South Division	8/9	
1904/05	Hampshire League South Division	9/9	Left competition

=== FA Cup ===
Season	Round	Opponents	Result
1894/95	1st Qualifying Round	A v Warmley	L 1–3
1895/96	1st Qualifying Round	H v Southampton St Mary's	L 1–5
1896/97	2nd Qualifying Round	A v Bedminster	L 0-2
1897/98	1st Qualifying Round	A v Oxford City	W 3-1
	2nd Qualifying Round	A v Cowes	L 0-6
1898/99	1st Qualifying Round	H v Andover	W 2-0
	2nd Qualifying Round	H v Oxford City	W 2-1
	3rd Qualifying Round	A v Bristol St George	L 0-7
1899/00	1st Qualifying Round	A v Eastleigh Athletic	L 0-5
1900/01			
1901/02	1st Qualifying Round	A v Eastleigh Athletic	W 3-0
	2nd Qualifying Round	A v Whiteheads	L 0-1
1902/03	1st Qualifying Round	A v North Hants Ironworks	L 0-3
1903/04	1st Qualifying Round	H v Eastleigh Athletic	W 2-0
	2nd Qualifying Round	H v North Hants Ironworks	W 4-2
	3rd Qualifying Round	H v Longfleet St Marys	W 2-1
	4th Qualifying Round	A v Plymouth Argyle	L 1-5
1904/05	Preliminary Round	A v Basingstoke Town	L 2-5

=== FA Amateur Cup ===
Season	Round	Opponents	Result
1893/94	1st Qualifying Round	H v Winsor & Eton	W 5-0
	2nd Qualifying Round	A v Maidenhead United	L 1–3
1902/03	2nd Qualifying Round	H v Whiteheads	L 0-6
