= County Ground, Southampton =

English cricket and football ground

County Ground
- Interactive map of County Ground

Ground information
- Location: Southampton, Hampshire
- Country: England
- Coordinates: 50°55′10″N 1°24′36″W
- Establishment: 1885
- Demolished: 2001
- Capacity: 7,000
- End names
- City End; Northlands Road End

International information
- First ODI: 16 June 1983: Australia v Zimbabwe
- Last ODI: 30 May 1999: Kenya v Sri Lanka
- Only WODI: 19 July 1998: England v Australia

Team information
Hampshire	(1885–2000)
- As of 5 September 2020; Source: CricketArchive

The County Ground in Southampton, England, was a cricket and football ground. It was the home of Hampshire County Cricket Club from the 1885 English cricket season until the 2000 English cricket season. The ground also served as the home ground for Southampton Football Club from 1896 to 1898.

== Background ==
Early Hampshire cricket teams had played first-class cricket in Southampton since 1842 at the Antelope Ground, under the supervision of Daniel Day. Following building speculation, the county team moved across the River Itchen to Day's Itchen Ground, although the building proposal fell through and so Hampshire returned across the river to the Antelope Ground. Hampshire County Cricket Club, formed in September 1863, became tenants. In 1883, James Fellowes began negotiations for the lease and development of 8 acres (32,000 m^{2}) land in Northlands Road which formed part of the Hulse estate. With an agreement reached between Hampshire County Cricket Club and the estate, Hampshire played their final match at the Antelope Ground in August 1884 and moved to Northlands Road for the 1885 season.

== History ==
=== Early years and football venue ===
The County Ground was originally leased for £160 annually, with the condition that a pavilion be built. This was done for the cost of £2,000, which had been raised. The County Ground was opened on 9 May 1885 by Elizabeth, Countess of Northesk, the wife of George Carnegie, 9th Earl of Northesk who was at the time the club president. The grand opening match was between South Hampshire and North Hampshire. The inaugural first-class match saw Hampshire play a Marylebone Cricket Club (MCC) in June 1885 side captained by the Scot John Russel; the MCC winning the match by an innings margin. Ten days later Hampshire played their first county match there with Derbyshire as the visitors, though this too resulted in another heavy innings defeat for Hampshire. In 1886, Hampshire lost its first-class status after years of difficult circumstances and poor results. However, Hampshire still played minor matches at the ground. The Hampshire County Ground Company was founded in 1893 and purchased the freehold of the ground from Sir Edward Hulse for £5,400. Hampshire were restored to first-class status in 1895, with the County Ground hosting its first County Championship match in the same year.

Southampton F.C. had used the County Ground for high-profile football matches prior to 1896, including FA Cup matches and the finals of the Hampshire Senior Cup. On 26 April 1893, a team from Stoke visited the County Ground to play a friendly match against Southampton St Mary's. Even with the future founder of football in Brazil, Charles Miller playing at outside-left, the "Saints" were "outplayed fairly and squarely on every point", losing 8–0. Despite the result, it was reported that the spectators "thoroughly enjoyed the exhibition" and looked forward to witnessing "more matches of a similar character" in future. Soon after a football stand was built next to the pavilion, with Southampton playing all their homes matches there in the Southern Football League for two seasons. However, with the £200 per annum rent to the County Cricket Club and with crowds of up to 12,000 attending matches, it was decided by the football club that due to the financial burden of the rent and inadequate facilities that they would move the short distance to the newly constructed Dell for the 1898–99 season. The highest score during Southampton's tenureship was in a Southern League match against New Brompton on 7 November 1896, which "the Saints" won 8–3 with a hat-trick from Willie Naughton. In the FA Cup, Southampton defeated Swindon Town 8–2 on 2 January 1897, with Jack Farrell scoring three, and Eastville Rovers 8–1 on 11 December 1897.

Developments continued afoot at the ground, with a new frontage for the main pavilion being built in 1896, with the addition a newly built ladies pavilion adjacent to it. The football stand was redeveloped in 1900 and eleven years later a new scoreboard was erected. During this period, Hampshire had financial difficulties and it was discussed by the committee in 1904 to close the ground. The closure of the ground never materialised and in 1912 Hampshire famously defeated the touring Australians, their first victory over a touring team, with Phil Mead scoring an unbeaten 160 and Alec Kennedy taking match figures of 11 for 181.

=== Inter-war years ===
With first-class cricket in England suspended as a result of the First World War, no first-class matches were held at the County Ground between August 1914 and June 1919. The touring Australians made what would become the highest team total at the ground in first-class matches, scoring 708 for 7 declared, with no less than three centuries in the Australians innings by Warren Bardsley (209), Charlie Macartney (105) and Johnny Taylor (143).

=== 1919–1939 ===
In 1921 the touring Australians scored 708-7 declared, the highest first-class innings on the ground. The match ended in a draw. In 1930 crowds flocked to the County Ground to watch Don Bradman complete his 1,000 runs before the end of May, with Bradman making 191 runs in Australians first innings. During this period in the grounds history, Phil Mead was in his prime and by 1932, Mead had completed centuries against every county, finishing with a hundred against Derbyshire. In a career that spanned from 1905 to 1936, he made 138 centuries in 700 matches and heads the list of Hampshire's great run-makers. Mead played on the ground 187 times, where he scored 14,504 runs at an average of 56.42.

First-class cricket was once more suspended in England during the Second World War, with bombing an ever-present threat throughout the wars early years.

=== 1939–2000 ===
The County Ground played host to Hampshire's 1961 and 1973 County Championship winning seasons, as well as playing host to its first List-A match in 1965, when Norfolk were the visitors in the 1965 Gillette Cup.

In 1983 the ground hosted its first One Day International when Australia took on Zimbabwe in the 1983 Cricket World Cup. Australia won the match by four wickets.

Cardigan Connor who took 9–38 in 1996 and Kevan James took four wickets in four balls in the match against the touring Indians in the same year. In 1999 the ground played host to its final two One Day Internationals in the 1999 Cricket World Cup when New Zealand played the West Indies, with the West Indies winning by seven wickets. The second match saw Kenya play Sri Lanka, which the Sri Lankans won by 45 runs.

Hampshire sold the County Ground in May 1998 to Berkeley Homes for £5 million. After 115 years at the County Ground, the 2000 County Championship marked the club's last season at the County Ground. The ground's last first-class match saw Yorkshire as the visitors. The County Ground played host to three One Day International, 565 first-class matches and 211 List-A matches.

For 2001, Hampshire moved to the new Rose Bowl ground. The site of the County Ground is now a housing estate.

== Cricket records ==
=== International ===
==== One-Day International ====
- Highest team total: 275/8 (50 overs) by Sri Lanka v. Kenya, 1999
- Lowest team total: 156 (48.1 overs) by New Zealand v. West Indies, 1999
- Highest individual innings: 84 by David Houghton for Zimbabwe v. Australia, 1983
- Best bowling in an innings: 4/46 by Mervyn Dillon for West Indies v. New Zealand, 1999

=== Domestic ===
==== First-class ====
- Highest team total: 708/7d by the Australians v. Hampshire, 1921
- Lowest team total: 30 by Hampshire v. Nottinghamshire, 1932
- Highest individual innings: 303* by Graeme Hick for Worcestershire v. Hampshire, 1997
- Best bowling in an innings: 9–38 by Cardigan Connor for Hampshire v. Gloucestershire, 1996
- Best bowling in a match: 17–119 by Walter Mead for Essex v. Hampshire, 1895

==== List A ====
- Highest team total: 371/4 (60 overs) by Hampshire v. Glamorgan, 1975
- Lowest team total: 63 (30.3 overs) by Hampshire v. Surrey, 1997
- Highest individual innings: 177 by Gordon Greenidge for Hampshire v. Glamorgan, 1975
- Best bowling in an innings: 7/30 by Peter Sainsbury for Hampshire v. Norfolk, 1965

== See also ==
- List of Hampshire County Cricket Club grounds
- List of cricket grounds in England and Wales
