= History of Southampton F.C. =

History of an English football club

Chart of yearly table positions of Southampton in the Football League 1921–2025

Southampton Football Club is a professional football club that was formed in 1885.

The roots of the club can be traced to members of St. Mary's Church Young Men's Association, who played their football at various venues in Southampton for 13 years, prior to the move to the club's former ground, The Dell in 1898, where it remained until 2001.

== Formation ==
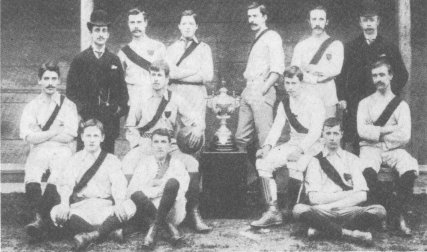
The first known photograph of the St. Mary's team taken two weeks after the Hampshire Junior Cup final in April 1888. (Standing: F. J. Montgomery, G. Carter, M. Warn, J. L. Sommerville, A. A. Fry, G .C. Gandy. Sitting: A. Varley, C. E. Bromley (Capt.), G. Muir, A. Gandy. On ground: C. Deacon, F. J. Crossley, R. Ruffell.) Picture by F. G. O. Stuart.

In 2001 the move from The Dell to the new Friends Provident St. Mary's Stadium was deemed to be a spiritual homecoming for Southampton Football Club, because of the new stadium's proximity to St. Mary's Church, the church where the club was founded by members of the St. Mary's Church of England Young Men's Association.

The club's first match was played on 21 November 1885 on a pitch in Northlands Road, where the Hampshire Bowling Club was subsequently situated, close to the County Cricket Ground; St. Mary's won 5–1 against Freemantle, with three goals from Charles Bromley and two from A. A. Fry; in goal was Ralph Ruffell, who would remain with the club for nearly ten years.

St. Mary's Y.M.A., as the club was usually referred to in the local press, played most of its early games on Southampton Common, where games were frequently interrupted by pedestrians insistent on exercising their right to roam. More important matches, such as cup games, were played either at the County Ground, Northlands Road, or the Antelope Cricket Ground in St Mary's Road.

The club was originally known as St. Mary's Young Men's Association F.C. (usually abbreviated to "St. Mary's Y.M.A.") and then became simply St. Mary's F.C. in 1887–88, before adopting the name Southampton St. Mary's when the club joined the Southern League in 1894. After the club won the Southern League title in 1896–97, it became a limited company and changed its name to Southampton F.C.

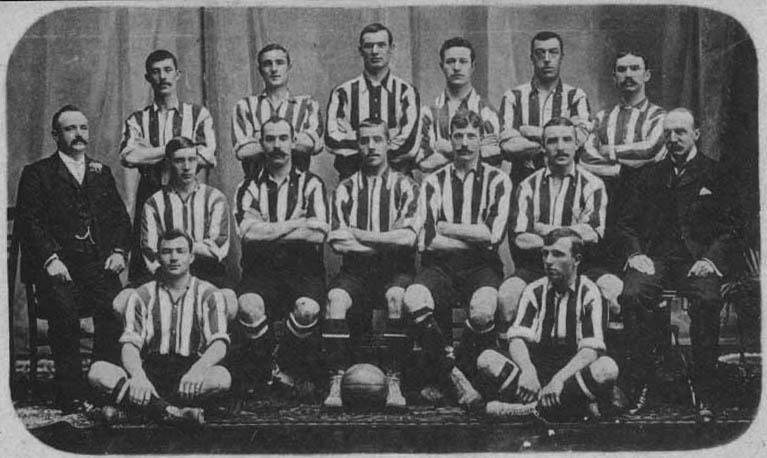
The team that played Argentine team Alumni in Buenos Aires, 1904.

The club won the Southern League championship for three years running between 1897 and 1899 and again in 1901, 1903 and 1904. This success spanned some major changes for the Saints, as the club moved to a newly built, £10,000 stadium called The Dell, to the northwest of the city centre in 1898. Although it would spend the next 103 years there, the future was far from certain in those early days and the club had to rent the premises first before it could stump up the cash to purchase the stadium in the early part of the 20th century.

Before the end of the 19th century, the South Coast reached the first of its four FA Cup Finals in 1900, losing 4–0 to Bury. Two years later, the club reached the 1902 final, where they were defeated 2-1 by Sheffield United in a replay. Following these appearances, the club would not reach another FA Cup Final for over seven decades, until 1976.

In 1904, Southampton F.C. became the first British club to tour on South America to play a series of friendly matches in Argentina and Uruguay. They would be followed for other English and Scottish clubs that visited the region, contributing to the spread and develop of football in South America during the first years of the 20th century.

== Joining the Football League ==
After World War I, when many teams were broken up by the call of National Service, Saints joined the newly formed Football League Division 3 in 1920 which split into South and North sections a year later. The 1920–21 season ended in triumph with promotion and marked the beginning of a 31-year stay in Division 2.

In 1925 and 1927, Saints reached the semi-finals of the FA Cup, losing 2–0 and 2–1 to Sheffield United and Arsenal respectively.

Saints was briefly forced to switch home matches to the ground of their local rivals Portsmouth at Fratton Park during World War II when a bomb landed on The Dell pitch in November 1940, leaving an 18-foot crater which damaged an underground culvert and flooded the pitch.

== Post-war years ==
Promotion was narrowly missed in 1947–48 when the club finished in third place, a feat repeated the following season (despite having an eight-point lead with just eight games to play) while in 1949–50 the club was to be denied promotion by 0.06 of a goal, missing out on second place to Sheffield United. In the 1948–49 and 1949–50 seasons, Charlie Wayman scored a total of 56 goals, but relegation in 1953 sent Saints sliding back into Division 3 (South).

It took until 1960 for Saints to regain Division 2 status, with Derek Reeves scoring 39 of the champions' 106 league goals. On 27 April 1963, a crowd of 68,000 at Villa Park saw the side lose 1–0 to Manchester United in the FA Cup semi-final.

== Reaching the First Division ==
The dream of Division 1 football at the Dell for the first time was finally realised in 1966 when Ted Bates' team was promoted as runners-up, with Martin Chivers scoring 30 of Saints' 85 league goals. Promotion was a never-to-be-forgotten achievement.

For the following campaign, Ron Davies arrived to score 43 goals in his first season as Saints scored 74 league goals, conceding 92. Saints stayed among the elite for eight years, with the highest finishing position being seventh place in 1968–69 and again in 1970–71. These finishes were high enough for them to qualify for the Inter-Cities Fairs Cup in 1969–70 (going out in Round 3 to Newcastle United) and its successor, the UEFA Cup in 1971–72, when the club went out in the first round to Spanish side Athletic Bilbao.

In December 1973, long-term manager Ted Bates stood down to be replaced by Lawrie McMenemy, who was unable to prevent The Saints becoming the first victims of the new three-down relegation system in 1974 when it was relegated, along with Manchester United and Norwich City.

Under Lawrie McMenemy's management, Saints started to rebuild in Division 2, capturing players such as Peter Osgood, Jim McCalliog and Jim Steele, and its greatest moment came in 1976, when the club reached the 1976 FA Cup Final, playing Manchester United at Wembley Stadium, and surprised all observers by beating United 1–0 thanks to a goal from Bobby Stokes.

The following season, Saints played in Europe again in the 1976–77 European Cup Winners' Cup, reaching round 3 where it lost 2–3 on aggregate to Belgian club Anderlecht.

== Return to the top flight ==
In 1977–78, captained by Alan Ball, Saints finished runners-up in the Second Division (behind champions Bolton Wanderers) and returned to the First Division.

The side finished comfortably in 14th place in its first season back in the top flight, and in the following season, it returned to Wembley in the final of the League Cup, when they acquitted themselves well, losing 3–2 to Nottingham Forest.

In 1980, McMenemy made his finest signing, capturing reigning European Footballer of the Year Kevin Keegan. Although Keegan's Southampton career lasted only two years, Saints fielded an attractive side also containing Alan Ball, Phil Boyer, Mick Channon and Charlie George and in 1980–81; the club scored 76 goals and finished in sixth place, at the time its highest league finish.

The 1981–82 season was another successful campaign for the Saints, who by December 1981 were looking like serious title contenders and finally went top of the table on 30 January 1982 with a 1–0 away win over struggling Middlesbrough. Despite finding itself on the receiving end of a 5–2 demolition at Ipswich Town less than three weeks later (in which Alan Brazil scored all five of the Suffolk club's goals), the Saints hung onto its lead of the league before they were finally leapfrogged by Swansea City on 20 March after nearly two months at the top. They briefly regained their lead of the league a week later with a 4–3 home win over Stoke City , but their form during the final few weeks of the season took something of a nosedive and they had to settle for a seventh-place finish – not even enough for UEFA Cup qualification – as the title went to Liverpool.

Southampton continued to progress well under McMenemy's stewardship, and with a team containing Peter Shilton, Nick Holmes, David Armstrong, top-scorer Steve Moran and Danny Wallace reached their highest ever league finish as runners-up in 1983–84 (three points behind champions Liverpool) as well as reaching the semi-final of the FA Cup, losing 1–0 to Everton at Highbury Stadium. This meant that they came closer than any other English team that season to winning the double.

They finished fifth the following year, but as a result of the Heysel Disaster all English clubs were banned from European competition – had it not been for this, then Southampton would have qualified for the UEFA Cup once again. McMenemy resigned as manager on 1 June 1985 after nearly 12 years in charge, and was succeeded by former player Chris Nicholl.

== After McMenemy ==
Lawrie McMenemy left at the end of the 1984–85 season to be succeeded by Chris Nicholl, who was sacked after six years in charge despite preserving the club's top-flight status. He was replaced by Ian Branfoot, who until the end of the 1990–91 season had been assistant manager to Steve Coppell at Crystal Palace.

By this stage, a key player in the Southampton lineup was Guernsey-born striker Matthew Le Tissier, the best-loved player in Saints' recent history. He was voted PFA Young Player of the Year in 1990 and later made seven appearances for the England national team – he finally retired in 2002 at the age of 33. During his time with the Saints, Le Tissier was approached more than once by several bigger clubs (including Manchester United) but chose to stick with the Saints despite never winning a major trophy or experiencing European football with them.

From 1989 to 1992, Le Tissier was regularly partnered up front by another notable player, Alan Shearer, who as a 17-year-old had scored a hat-trick on his Saints debut against Arsenal in April 1988 and became a regular player in the 1989–90 season, and by 1991–92 was firmly established as one of the English league's highest rated strikers. After months of speculation that Shearer was going to join Manchester United, he was sold to Blackburn Rovers for a national record of £3.6 million in July 1992. He went on to enjoy an illustrious career as one of English football's leading goalscorers of all time, as well as collecting a league title with Blackburn in 1995, and becoming the world's most expensive footballer with his £15 million move in July 1996 to Newcastle United, where he remained until his retirement as a player ten years later. Shearer was also capped 63 times for England, scoring 30 goals.

== In the Premiership ==
Southampton were founding members of the Premiership in 1992–93, having played in the top flight of English football since 1978. In May 2005, however, they were relegated to the second tier of English football for the first time in 27 years.

Ian Branfoot was sacked in January 1994 with Southampton battling relegation. He was replaced by Exeter City manager Alan Ball. Ball secured the Saints' survival for the 1993–94 season and guided them to a respectable tenth-place finish in the Premiership in 1994–95, with inspirational performances from Matthew Le Tissier. But Ball was lured to Manchester City in the summer of 1995 and Southampton turned to long-serving coach David Merrington to take charge of the team in 1995–96. Southampton finished 17th with 38 league points, avoiding relegation on goal difference. Two important wins during the final weeks of the season did much to ensure that Saints and not Manchester City would achieve Premiership survival. First came a 3–1 home win over eventual double winners Manchester United, then came a 1–0 away win over relegated Bolton Wanderers. Merrington was dismissed a few days after the end of the season and replaced by former Liverpool and Rangers manager Graeme Souness.

Southampton fared little better in 1996–97 despite the arrival of Souness, whose track record included two Scottish league titles with Rangers and an FA Cup victory with Liverpool. He resigned after just one season in charge, which had seen Southampton finish 16th in the Premiership, and Southampton's directors turned to Dave Jones, one of the most respected managers outside the Premiership who had won promotion to Division One with Stockport County as well as reaching the League Cup semi finals.

With such an inexperienced manager, Southampton were tipped by many observers to be relegated from the Premiership in 1997–98. However, thanks to the addition of young striker Kevin Davies, and the acquisition of a few others, Southampton achieved a respectable 12th-place finish in the table. The side's form dipped in 1998–99 league, but they avoided relegation on the last day of the season. In 1999, Southampton was given the go-ahead to build a new 32,000-seat stadium in the St Mary's area of the city, a welcome move after playing in the cramped Dell since 1898.

During the 1999–2000 season, Dave Jones quit as Southampton manager to concentrate on a court case after he was accused of abusing children at the children's home where he had worked during the 1980s. The accusations were later proved to be groundless but it was too late to save Jones's career as Southampton manager and he was succeeded by ex-England national team manager Glenn Hoddle.

Glenn Hoddle helped keep Southampton well clear of the Premiership drop zone but having received an offer from another club, he moved to Tottenham Hotspur just before the end of the 2000–01 season. He was replaced by first-team coach Stuart Gray, who oversaw the relocation to the St Mary's Stadium for the 2001–02 season. At the end of the 2000–01 season, in the last ever competitive match at the Dell, the talismanic Matthew Le Tissier came on late to strike the last ever goal in sublime fashion. Southampton finished the match 3–2 against Arsenal, providing a fairy-tale ending to the days at The Dell. But Gray was sacked after a disastrous start to the following season, and in came ex-Coventry City manager Gordon Strachan as his replacement.

Strachan did much to revitalise Southampton during the 2001–02 season, and they finished in a secure 11th place in the final league table. The club did even better in its 2002–03 season, finishing eighth in the Premiership and coming runners-up in the FA Cup to Arsenal (after losing 1–0 at the Millennium Stadium).

Strachan resigned in March 2004 (to take a break from football) and was replaced by Paul Sturrock, who had been in the process of guiding Plymouth Argyle to their second promotion in three seasons. Rumours of player dissatisfaction and personal problems, however, dogged Sturrock, and he was replaced just five months later by reserve team coach Steve Wigley. Wigley's tenure proved disastrous, with Southampton slipping further and further down the Premiership table. Frenchman Christian Damiano was brought in to assist, but after a run of only one win in 14 games, both men's contracts were terminated.

Chairman Rupert Lowe risked the ire of Saints fans when he appointed Harry Redknapp as manager on 8 December 2004. The news shocked much of the football world, as Redknapp had resigned as manager of Saints' arch-rivals Portsmouth just days previously. Lowe and Southampton continued to make headlines after former England Rugby World Cup-winning coach Sir Clive Woodward joined the club, eventually being appointed technical director.

== Relegated after 27 years ==
Redknapp failed to rejuvenate the Saints, and on 15 May 2005 Southampton were relegated from the Premiership following a 2–1 home defeat to Manchester United, ending 27 successive seasons of top division football. Saints made a disappointing start to the season, with the emergence of young star Theo Walcott as a rare cause for optimism. Yet even more shocks were to await the fans.

On 24 November 2005, Portsmouth manager Alain Perrin, the man who himself replaced Harry Redknapp at Southampton's arch-rivals, was sacked by chairman Milan Mandarić. Rumours gradually grew apace that Mandarić and Redknapp had resolved the dispute that caused Redknapp to walk out in the first place, and that he was poised to rejoin his former club.

With these rumours seemingly reaching breaking point in the media – not to mention the bookmakers – Redknapp walked out on Southampton on 3 December 2005. The two rival clubs found themselves at loggerheads over legal compensation, which threatened to leave Redknapp in limbo, but with the dispute eventually resolved, Redknapp rejoined Portsmouth on 7 December 2005. After three matches under caretaker manager Dave Bassett and assistant Dennis Wise, George Burley was unveiled as the club's new head coach on 22 December to work alongside Clive Woodward, who was promoted from performance director to director of football.

== Boardroom changes ==
In the wake of overwhelming calls for him to stand down, Lowe eventually resigned on 30 June 2006, a few days before an extraordinary general meeting that was predicted to see him removed from the club's board. He was replaced as chairman by Jersey-based businessman Michael Wilde, who had become the club's major shareholder.

During the 2006–07 season, the board set about trying to secure new investment in the club. On 26 February 2007, however, it was announced that Wilde would step down as chairman of the football club on 28 February after failing to secure any inward investment into the company. On 2 March, it was announced that Leon Crouch would take the role of "acting Chairman" until the end of the current season, when the Board will re-assess the situation.

On 27 April 2007, it was rumoured that Paul Allen, the American entrepreneur who formed Microsoft with Bill Gates, may launch a takeover bid for the club. An apparent close source said, "[H]e believes there is long term investment value in UK Soccer. Southampton is a sleeping giant, a family-supported club with traditional values, and we see the value in taking the brand global."

== In the Championship (2005–09) ==
Southampton's off-the-field controversy affected their on-the-field fortunes substantially during 2005–06, and at one point they were in real danger of a second successive relegation. But their form improved during the final weeks of the season and they finished a secure 12th.

The good form which secured Southampton's Championship status in 2005–06 was carried through to the start of the 2006–07 season, and the turn of the year saw the team in fourth place in the table. The new board of directors had spent a club record £6 million on transfers: Polish strikers Grzegorz Rasiak and Marek Saganowski and 17-year-old left back Gareth Bale all had great runs in form. However, a drastic loss in the team's form overall, coupled with inept displays against fellow promotion hopefuls, saw the team drop to eighth place by mid-March 2007, and rapidly losing touch with the promotion race. With other promotion rivals dropping points and a small run of form in late April, however, Southampton were able to finishing in sixth place, the last play-off position. They lost the home leg of their playoff semi-final to Derby County, and on 15 May achieved parity on aggregate but lost on penalties in a thrilling encounter.

The 2007–08 season initially looked to be an unremarkable campaign, with the club in mid-table for the first half of the league campaign. Once again, however, Southampton experienced a major loss of form in the spring, not helped by managerial instability caused by the resignation of George Burley followed by caretaker spells by John Gorman and then Nigel Pearson, and were left in serious danger of relegation to League One on the last day of the season. Fortunately, a win combined with some other favourable results ensured their survival for another year, but the enforced sale of most of their star players combined with the general inexperience of the remaining players and yet more changes in the managerial seat (Pearson was replaced by Jan Poortvliet prior to the start of the season, before Mark Wotte took over midway through the campaign) led to a disastrous 2008–09 season in which the club were never outside the bottom five at any point in the campaign, and never left the relegation zone after Christmas.

== In League One (2009–11) ==
Southampton were told on 23 April 2009 that it would be deducted ten points either in the 2008–09 season, should they finish outside the bottom three, or in 2009–10, in the event of them being relegated, due to its parent company going into administration a few weeks earlier. However, the deduction occurred at the start of the 2009–10 season, when Southampton began playing in League One, as the club finished 23rd out of 24 at the end of the 2008–09 Championship season.

The 2009–10 season represented the first season since 1960 that the club has played at the third tier of English league football. On 8 July 2009, Southampton was bought by Swiss businessman Markus Liebherr, rescuing the club from administration. Alan Pardew was appointed as the Saints' new manager and signed a three-year contract. On 28 March 2010, Southampton defeated Carlisle United 1–4 at Wembley to win the Football League Trophy. Despite this, the points deduction and a mediocre start to the season prevented them from truly mounting a promotion challenge, with the season ending in a seventh-place finish. Upon the death of Markus in August 2010, his daughter Katharina Liebherr inherited the club.

The following season started well, but Pardew was sacked barely a month into the season after an apparent fall-out with the club's board, and Nigel Adkins succeeded him as manager. Under his leadership, the club were promoted as runners-up on the final day of the season in a 3–1 victory against Walsall, ending a two-year spell in the third flight.

== In the Championship (2011–12) ==
Southampton played in the Football League Championship where they quickly showed defiance so that by the end of the season, after winning 4–0 against relegated Coventry City, the Saints were back in the Premier League.
