= 1888–89 St. Mary's F.C. season =

English football club season

St. Mary's F.C.
1888–89 season
- Honorary President: Canon Basil Wilberforce
- Secretary: F. A. Delamotte
- Ground: Southampton Common
- Hampshire Junior Cup: Winners
- Top goalscorer: League: N/A; All: Frank Bromley / F. A. Delamotte (4)
- Highest home attendance: Reported as 5,000 – 7,000 (Hampshire Junior Cup semi-final at the County Ground
Home colours

1888–89 was the fourth season for St. Mary's Football Club (St. Mary's F.C.) based in Southampton in southern England. The club retained the Hampshire Junior Cup for the second consecutive year.

== Summary of the season ==
The highlight of the season was the Hampshire Junior Cup and, in particular, the semi-final match which required four matches to get past Cowes. This match generated so much interest in the town that the crowds at the County Ground reached "unprecedented" levels, with some reports claiming up to 7,000 present for the fourth match.

By the end of the season, the Saints' main local rivals, Woolston Works had disbanded leaving St. Mary's as Southampton's most prominent and well-supported football club.

== Personnel ==
At the start of the season, the St. Mary's captain, Ned Bromley had moved to London to study dentistry; his role as captain was taken over by George Carter, although Bromley remained with the club, and continued to play in important matches, travelling from London by train.

George Muir was on teacher-training at Winchester so relinquished the role of club secretary which was taken over by new recruit, F. A. Delamotte.

Ned Bromley's career came to an end shortly after the 1889 final of the Hampshire Junior Cup, when he was seriously injured in a six-a-side tournament.

== Home ground ==
At the start of the season, St. Mary's were still based on Southampton Common, although they hired the County Ground or the Antelope Ground for more popular friendly matches, as well as for Hampshire Junior Cup matches, for which the common was unsuitable as the pitch was not enclosed and thus no entrance fee could be charged. The published match reports frequently omitted any mention of where the match was played or of the names of the players.

== Strip ==
The players continued to wear white shorts, black knee-length socks and "white tunics" with a red sash worn diagonally, although, unlike in earlier years, the sash was worn consistently on the left shoulder.

== Hampshire Junior Cup ==
The defence of the Hampshire Junior Cup started with a home match against Havant played at the County Ground on 24 November 1888. With Ned Bromley and George Muir being unavailable as they were both away studying, the Saints' team had a rather makeshift appearance with A. A. Fry playing at full-back in place of Muir, alongside George Carter, Frank Bromley replacing his brother as a forward and four players (Stride, Mate, Delamotte and Farwell) making their competitive debut. The match was won easily 5–0, with Frank Bromley scoring four goals.

St. Mary's received a bye in the next round seeing them through to a home tie against Fordingbridge Turks, the oldest team in Hampshire having been founded in 1868. The match was scheduled to be played on 12 January which coincided with a Hampshire F.A. match against Berks & Bucks F.A. for which four St. Mary's players (Ruffell, Carter, Stride and Ned Bromley) had been selected. St. Mary's tried to have the cup match postponed but Fordingbridge refused so the St. Mary's players were withdrawn from the Hampshire F.A. squad. As a result of the doubt over the date of the match, no ground had been organised; on the Saturday morning, Mr. Oswald, the owner of the Oswald, Mordaunt & Co. shipyard in Woolston "kindly allowed them to play at the Antelope". The shipyard's football team, Woolston Works were now tenants of the Antelope Ground, which stood near the top of St. Mary's Road. The match was a close-fought encounter which St. Mary's won (as reported in the Southampton Times) "by three goals and one disputed goal to two".

The semi-final draw set up a match against Cowes on the Isle of Wight to be played on 24 February. The Cowes team included five who had previously played for the Hampshire F.A. compared to the four St. Mary's players and were the favourites to go through to the final. The referee for the match was William Pickford, a journalist who was the driving force behind the Hampshire F.A. and the spread of football throughout the county; Pickford was later to become the president of the Football Association. At half-time, Cowes were leading by the only goal, scored on 20 minutes, after the ball rebounded into the goal off Whiteley, a Cowes forward, from an attempted clearance by Carter. Cowes's main protagonist was Staite, an infantry private stationed at Parkhurst Barracks, whose "beautiful dribbling" was causing difficulties for the St. Mary's defence requiring the combined attentions of Carter and Verney (at left-half) to contain him. With only two minutes of the match remaining, St. Mary's equalised from a "screw shot" from Farwell. The home side requested that an extra half-hour should be played, but Carter, the St. Mary's captain, declined as the players and fans had to catch the ferry back to Southampton.

The replay was set for a fortnight later at the County Ground for which special boats were chartered to bring the Cowes supporters over to the mainland. this time it was St. Mary's who took the lead, through Fry. Staite was again at the centre of the Cowes attacks, hitting the bar with "a brilliant shot" before "scientific play" on the Cowes wings led to their equaliser from Ballard, with a few minutes left to play. As with the first match, the home side requested extra time, but this was declined by the Cowes captain.

With a crowd estimated at 2,000 having attended the first replay, the Hampshire County Cricket Club offered to host the second replay at the County Ground and pay the travelling expenses for the Cowes players. Despite this proposal, and suggestions that the match should be played at a more neutral venue in Winchester or Portsmouth, the Hampshire F.A. decided that the venue should be determined by the toss of a coin. St. Mary's won the toss so the second replay was arranged for the County Ground on Wednesday 13 March. As the final was scheduled to be played the following Saturday, the Hampshire F.A. instructed that the match must produce a finalist.

By now, the contest between the two clubs had produced great excitement amongst the public, and the crowd at the County Ground on the Wednesday afternoon was considerably larger than that on the previous Saturday. Cowes took an early lead through their centre-forward, Trask, before Bromley equalised. Warn then scored what appeared to be the winning goal for St. Mary's. The ball appeared to be "half a yard" behind the line before it was caught and thrown out by Lieverman, the Cowes goalkeeper. The home players claimed the goal, which was contested by Cowes. The referee consulted the linesman and awarded the goal. The Hampshire Independent reported that, following the dispute, "the excitement ... increased both inside and outside the ropes" although there was no further score. It seemed, therefore, that St. Mary's were through to the final until Cowes lodged a written protest. Cowes's initial protest, on the grounds that the linesman had not raised his flag until after the St. Mary's players appealed, was rejected by the Hampshire F.A. Cowes then lodged a further protest, that, before the referee had actually awarded the goal, the linesman had stopped the ball with his flag even though the ball was technically still in play. Despite St. Mary's challenge to the admissibility of new evidence, the protest was heard and accepted, so the two sides had to meet again to decide the tie.

St. Mary's again won the toss and the rematch was played at the County Ground on the following Saturday, 16 March, with the final being postponed. With excitement in both Southampton and Cowes mounting further, over 800 supporters crossed from the Isle of Wight with the total crowd being estimated variously at 5,000 and 7,000, including "over 1,000 ladies". The players were also "fired up" for the rematch and Lieverman was kept busy in the Cowes goal until Fry eventually scrambled the ball home from a Verney corner kick. St. Mary's lead was soon doubled when Verney shot as a team-mate charged the goalkeeper, allowing the ball to slip into the net. In the second half, Cowes came back strongly with Staite scoring after a "dazzling run". The St. Mary's defence prevented any further goals from Cowes, before two late goals from Delamotte. The first came after a shot from Fry hit the crossbar and dropped onto Delamotte's head, while the second came from a "vigorous" shot.

The final was held at Bar End, in Winchester against Christchurch on 6 April. After the excitement of the semi-final round, the final was an anti-climax. Most of the game was played deep in the Christchurch half; so much so, that Ruffell in the St. Mary's goal "was enabled to get through a cigarette or two to pass away the tedious moments he had in goal". St. Mary's won 3–0, with the goals coming from Delamotte, N. Bromley and Warn. No estimate of the crowd was included in any match report, although it was reckoned that two-thirds of the crowd came from Southampton. "What happened on arrival at Southampton Docks (station) can be better imagined than described, but jubilation is not precisely the word for it".

At the end of the season, the Bournemouth Guardian, edited by William Pickford, concluded that St. Mary's cup progress had "aroused the widest enthusiasm in the county and resulted in such large gates that the County Association certainly owes a debt of gratitude to either them or Cowes or both for raising them from a hand-to-mouth state of existence to that of having a satisfactory balance in the bank".

=== Results ===
Date	Round	Opponents	H / A	Result F – A	Scorers	Attendance (estimated)
24 November 1888	1st	Havant	H	5 – 0	Delamotte, F. Bromley (4)	
12 January 1889	3rd	Fordingbridge Turks	H	4 – 2	Arter, Deacon, N. Bromley, Warn	
24 February 1889	Semi-final	Cowes	A	1 – 1	Farwell	
9 March 1889	Semi-final replay	Cowes	H	1 – 1	Fry	2,000
13 March 1889	Semi-final second replay	Cowes	N	2 – 1	N. Bromley, Warn	
16 March 1889	Semi-final rematch	Cowes	N	4 – 1	Fry, Verney, Delamotte (2)	5,000 – 7,000
6 April 1889	Final	Christchurch	N	3 – 0	Delamotte, N. Bromley, Warn	

==== Legend ====
Win	Draw	Loss

== Friendly matches ==
St. Mary's continued to play friendly matches throughout the season, although reports are not available for many of these. Despite their domination in the Hampshire Junior Cup matches, the team lost four friendlies and only managed two victories.

=== Results ===
The results of the friendly matches that are known were as follows:

Date	Opponents	H / A	Result F – A	Scorers
6 October 1888	Woolston Works	H	1 – 2	Delamotte
3 November 1888	Winchester Rovers	A	1 – 2	Varley
1 December 1888	Christchurch	H	2 – 2	N. Bromley, Farwell
29 December 1888	Freemantle	A	1 – 1	Warn
2 February 1889	Cowes	A	0 – 1	
9 February 1889	Bannister Court	A	2 – 1	Warn, Delamotte
16 February 1889	Freemantle	H	2 – 3	Deacon, F. Bromley
19 February 1889	Winchester	H	1 – 0	Fry

== Player statistics ==
The players who appeared in the Hampshire Junior Cup were as follows. This list does not include appearances or goals in friendly matches.

Position	Name	Apps	Goals
FB	J. T. Arter	5	1
FW	Ned Bromley	6	3
FW	Frank Bromley	1	4
FB	George Carter	7	0
HB	F. J. Crossley	1	0
HB	Charles Deacon	7	1
FW	F. A. Delamotte	7	4
FW	Arthur Farwell	7	1
FW	A. A. Fry	7	2
FW	Ernest Mate	1	0
FB	George Muir	1	0
GK	Ralph Ruffell	7	0
HB	William Stride	6	0
HB	George Verney	6	1
FW	M. Warn	7	3
HB	G. Williams	1	0

=== Key ===
- GK — Goalkeeper
- FB — Full back
- HB — Half-back
- FW — Forward

== Players ==
The players who made their first appearance for the club in 1888–89 include the following:

- John Thomas Arter (1866–1937) played in five of the Hampshire Junior Cup matches alongside George Carter; thus St. Mary's had Arter and Carter at full-back.
- Freeman Alexander Delamotte (1870–1933) was a surveyor by profession. He joined St. Mary's in 1888 and replaced George Muir as secretary. As a forward, he had a reputation for charging the opposition goalkeeper and the supporters would cry out: "Go for him, Delly". He remained with the club until 1893.
- Arthur George Farwell (1872–1940) was another forward, described as "full of tricks". He was employed in the drapery department of the Edwin Jones store, thus making him unavailable for Saturday afternoon matches. He remained with the club until 1893.
- William John Stride (1865–1942) (known as "Banquo") had played against St. Mary's for Southampton Harriers in the final of the Hampshire Junior Cup in the previous season. He played as a half-back. described as “a hard as nails robust, tall half- back”, he remained with St. Mary's until 1894. He was subsequently employed by the Southampton Borough Engineers department.
- William George Verney (1871–1950) played as a half-back. Described as "a tenacious half-back" who persisted "in his efforts to challenge for every loose ball", he linked up well with William Stride. He remained with St. Mary's until 1896.

== Bibliography ==
- Bull, David; Brunskell, Bob (2000). Match of the Millennium. Hagiology Publishing. ISBN 0-9534474-1-3.
- Chalk, Gary; Holley, Duncan (1987). Saints – A complete record. Breedon Books. ISBN 0-907969-22-4.
- Holley, Duncan (2012). Suited and Booted. Bristol: Hagiology Publishing. ISBN 0-9534474-9-9.
- Holley, Duncan; Chalk, Gary (1992). The Alphabet of the Saints. ACL & Polar Publishing. ISBN 0-9514862-3-3.
- Juson, Dave; Bull, David (2001). Full-Time at The Dell. Hagiology Publishing. ISBN 0-9534474-2-1.
