= 1885–86 St. Mary's Y.M.A. season =

English football club season

St. Mary's Y.M.A.
1885–86 season
- President: Rev. Arthur Sole
- Secretary: C. Abbott
- Ground: Southampton Common
- Top goalscorer: League: N/A; All: Ned Bromley (5)
Home colours

The first match played by what is now Southampton Football Club, from Southampton in southern England, was by a team from St. Mary's Young Men's Association (YMA) on 21 November 1885. Since then, the club established themselves as a major force in local and regional football before moving up to national level, winning the FA Cup in 1976 and being founder members of the Premier League in 1992.

== Background ==
=== National ===
The game of association football ("football") had been popular in England for many years, having its origins in the Middle Ages. The game was played under various rules, all of which were considerably different from the modern game. By the mid-19th century, attempts were being made to unify the rules, with these culminating in the foundation of the Football Association in October 1863.

The FA organised the first national tournament when they founded the Football Association Challenge Cup in 1871. At first, the cup was dominated by southern amateur sides, with the cup finals for the first ten years up to 1881 all being contested by teams from various public schools and similar institutions. Within the next two years, however, there had been a complete shift with Blackburn Rovers being the first northern club side to reach the final in 1882. The following year, the cup was won by a predominately working class side, when Blackburn Olympic defeated the Old Etonians. This was the last occasion that a public school side reached the final, and it was not until 1900 that a team from the south of England again reached the Cup Final, when Southampton were defeated by Bury, with Tottenham Hotspur going on to be the first southern professional club to win the cup in the following year.

This shift in football power to northern England was also reflected in the foundation of organised league football. By 1885, the FA had grudgingly accepted professionalism in football. The newly emerging professional clubs needed more regular competitive football and in 1888, The Football League was founded, involving 12 clubs from the midlands and north of England. The first southern side to be admitted to the Football League was Woolwich Arsenal, who joined the Second Division in 1893.

=== Local ===
The earliest known association football club in Southampton was Southampton Rangers, who had been founded in 1878. The team comprised workers, many of whom had been recruited from northern England, at the Oswald & Mordaunt (later Vosper Thorneycroft) shipyard and played their early games on Southampton Common. Among their players was a teacher, Mr. A. Wood, who became the club's secretary. Wood was later to be instrumental in the foundation of the Deanery football club.

In the 1870s however, the predominant winter ball game in Hampshire was rugby with at least seven Rugby sides having been established in Southampton by 1880. In November 1880, a 19-year-old clerk, Stanley Gibbs, was killed (with a broken spine) as a result of a collapsed scrummage in a rugby match played on Porters Mead (now Queens Park) between Trojans and Romsey Rangers. Following the inquest, John Cooksey J.P. the mayor of Southampton, attempted to ban all forms of football on public lands in Southampton. The ban was reported in the national press, with the Athletic News declaring that Mr. Cooksey was "maternally disposed" who bore the "senile temerity of bumbledom" upon his face. Although no football was played in Southampton on the day of Gibbs's funeral, on the following weekend the fixtures continued as normal.

Nonetheless, it appears that the tragic accident did precipitate a gradual shift towards association football. The Deanery club, which was founded in 1882 as an offshoot of the Deanery Cricket Club, decided from the outset to play "soccer". Writing some years later, A. A. Fry (who was to play in the Y.M.A.'s first match) recalled: "So far as I know, the first organised association football match in Southampton was played between two teams of teachers ... on the old Porter's Mead. Usually Rugby football was played there, and one day during a particularly fierce game one player was killed. This cast a shadow over the game for a time in the town, and it was then we began to play association football regularly".

The Deanery club folded in 1883, when the Town Council converted Porters Mead into a public park, with the last report being of a match in November 1883. By 1885, however, six soccer teams existed in the town and by 1893 the only rugby team still playing was Trojans (who still exist today). Among the soccer clubs was a team from Freemantle, then just outside the town boundary; the "Magpies", as Freemantle were known, were formed in 1884 and appear to have had strong links with Christ Church, Freemantle. Other clubs were Southampton Harriers, Spring Hill, Banister Court School and Somnambulists, a short-lived offshoot of Trojans Rugby Club, as well as Geneva Cross, a team from the Royal Victoria Military Hospital, based at Netley, to the south of the town.

The Harriers had started life as the Temperance Amateur Athletic Association but changed their name in 1885.

== St. Mary's Young Men's Association ==
St. Mary's Young Men's Association had been formed in the early 1880s under the auspices of St. Mary's Church, Southampton. The parish of St. Mary's had encompassed most of the eastern part of the town of Southampton, including across the River Itchen (what is now Woolston) and northwards to South Stoneham. By 1866, the parish had been sub-divided into several smaller parishes leaving St. Mary's Church presiding over the inner areas of Chapel, Crosshouse and part of Kingsland, although it remained the "mother church" for the town, having been founded in the 7th century. The present church was rebuilt under the auspices of Canon Basil Wilberforce, with the rebuilding starting in 1878 and being finished in 1884.

The parish contained some of the poorest parts of the town, with in excess of 8,000 parishioners, with the associated problems of violence, drunkenness and prostitution. The members of the YMA were (according to the St. Mary's Parish Journal of March 1886) "believers in muscular Christianity (who) think that the advantage of strong developed limbs, a supple frame, and a quick eye, cannot be overestimated". "Our young men ... use their physical strength and freedom as to make their power the handmaiden to that moral strength and decision of character, that shall free them from the world's slavery and bondage". The "Young Men" were generally middle class, "well-connected and well-educated", and were expected to attend regular Bible classes and carry out duties within the parish, including singing in the choir and teaching at Sunday school. They helped out at clubs for the working classes including the Crow's Nest, a night school "for a rough and neglected class of lads", and the Fo'c'sle, a "club for working lads".

By 1886, the YMA had separate football, cricket, athletics and gymnasium sections as well as its own choral society and an entertainments committee, who organised a series of lectures on a diverse range of subjects.

== Formation of the Football Club ==
In early November 1885,^{a} the members of St. Mary's Young Men's Association held a meeting at Grove Street schoolrooms to discuss the formation of a football club. The meeting was chaired by the Rev. Arthur Baron Sole (1853–1903)^{b} who was a curate at St. Mary's Church. Following the meeting, a match was arranged against Freemantle to be played on the "backfield" of the County Ground in Northlands Road, where the Hampshire Bowling Club was later established.

== Strip ==
The players wore white shorts, black knee-length socks and "white tunics" with a red sash worn diagonally. Early photographs show the sashes worn from either shoulder in a rather haphazard fashion. In the club's 125th season (2010–11), the players wore a stylised version of the original strip, with the "sash" diagonally from right to left. It has also been released again for the 2020–21 season. The third kit being the closest representation to the original sash design worn, the shirt also celebrates the clubs 135th year of its formation back in 1885.

== The first match ==
The following report appeared in both the Hampshire Independent and Southampton Times newspapers in the week after the match:^{c}

The football club which has just been formed in connection with St. Mary's Young Men's Association, played their first match on Saturday last according to "Association Rules", when they showed that they have among their members the materials with which to form a fairly strong club by practice. During the first half, St. Mary's scored four goals rather quickly, three of these being obtained from corner kicks. The game became much faster during the second half, and shortly after the change, St. Mary's scored another point. Freemantle then obtained a goal through the ball from a corner kick passing off one of the St. Mary's team and so through the posts. Up to the call of time, no further point was scored, so that St. Mary's were the victors by five goals to one. The goals were obtained by Bromley (three) and Fry (2). The Freemantle team showed some good play during the latter part of the game, while the good individual play of each of the St. Mary's team was well sustained throughout.

The match reports did not contain a list of players for either side. In 1912, the Southampton Pictorial published a feature on the history of Southampton Football Club. Members of the original side were consulted who came up with this line-up:

R. Ruffell, goal; G. H. Muir and R. McDonald, backs; A. G. Fry, C. Deacon and A. Gandy, half-backs; A. A. Fry, G. Gandy, C. E. Bromley, G. McIvor and A. Varley, forwards.

The reliability of this list of players has been called into question; A. G. Fry is later recorded as playing for Southampton Harriers in two matches against St. Mary's. The match reports for the remaining games do include team lists, and neither Ruffell nor McDonald are included in these. Of the players listed, four (A. A. Fry, A. G. Fry, George McIvor and George Gandy) had previously played for the Deanery Association Football side.

== Other matches ==
In the first season, the club arranged eight matches, although details of some of these have been lost; for example, a match was arranged against Totton on 16 January 1886 but no further details are available, although the St. Mary's Parish Magazine notes that the game was "lost".

On 9 January, the club played Southampton Harriers on Southampton Common; the Harriers had started life as the Temperance Amateur Athletic Association but changed their name in 1885. The Southampton Times described the match as "a very exciting football match (played) under Association Rules" "before a good concourse of people".

=== Results ===
The results of those matches that are known were as follows:

Date	Opponents	H / A	Result F – A	Scorers
21 November 1885	Freemantle	H	5 – 1	Bromley (3), A. A. Fry (2)
9 January 1886	Southampton Harriers	H	0 – 0	
23 January 1886	Freemantle	A	1 – 0	Deacon
13 February 1886	Totton	A	3 – 0	McIvor, Abbott, A. A. Fry
13 March 1886	Southampton Harriers	A	2 – 0	Bromley (2)

==== Legend ====
Win	Draw	Loss

== Aftermath ==
Over the next few years, the St. Mary's club gradually established itself as the premier club in Southampton, winning first the Hampshire Junior Cup for three consecutive years from 1887–88 to 1889–90 followed by the Hampshire Senior Cup which was won in 1890–91 and 1891–92. By now known as Southampton St. Mary's F.C., the club first entered the FA Cup in 1891–92, reaching the final in 1900 and 1902, eventually winning the cup in 1976.

The club joined the Southern League in 1894 (simplifying its name to Southampton F.C.) and were champions for six of the next ten years. In 1920, Southampton were founder members of the Football League Third Division, gradually working their way up through the divisions, to reach the First Division in 1966. In 1992, they were founder members of the Premier League where they remained until 2005; following a series of financial problems, the club dropped back down to the third tier of English football before successive promotions restored them to the Premier League in 2012.

== Players ==
The following is known about the eleven men who played in the inaugural match:

- Charles Edward Bromley (1869–1942) (known as "Ned Bromley") took over from A. A. Fry as captain in 1886; he remained with the club until 1889, when he was seriously injured in a six-a-side tournament. He had relinquished the captaincy to George Carter in the summer of 1888, when he moved to London to study dentistry. He was a prolific goalscorer and was the top goalscorer in each of the first three seasons, scoring a hat-trick in the inaugural match and four against Petersfield on 17 December 1887.
- Samuel Charles Deacon (1869–1893) was a powerful half-back who played for St.Mary's from the club's inaugural match until late 1892. He was employed as a clerk in the Southampton Telegraph Office until he died of a brain tumour in 1893.
- Albert Arthur Fry (1861–1937) was the team captain. He was a schoolteacher, who was later to become headmaster at Foundry Lane School in Shirley. Fry scored in the inaugural match; in the match against Petersfield on 17 December 1887, he scored five goals. He remained with the club until the summer of 1891, playing his last competitive match as goalkeeper. He had played for the Deanery club.
- Alfred George Fry (1864–1930) turned out occasionally for St. Mary's until 1888 as well as playing for Southampton Harriers. He had played for the Deanery club.
- Alfred Walter Gandy (1864–1914) remained at the club until 1888, and played in the final of the Hampshire Junior Cup.
- George Charles Gandy (1861–1905) (brother of Alfred) continued to play for the club until 1888 after which he continued as a trainer until 1890. He had played for the Deanery club. He remained with the club as chairman of the St. Mary's committee until the incorporation of the limited company in 1897.
- Robert C. McDonald (1857–1931) continued to play for St. Mary's until 1888, by which time he had moved into the forward line, scoring four goals in the Hampshire Junior Cup matches in 1887–88.
- George McIvor was also a teacher who became a headmaster at Eastern District School. He had played for the Deanery club. He never made a competitive appearance for the Saints.
- George Harvey Muir (1869–1939) was a schoolteacher who later became headmaster at Mount Pleasant School. He continued to play for St. Mary's until 1889, after which he became a referee. He refereed an Amateur Cup final and served the Hampshire F.A. for many years. In 1915, he became a director of Southampton Football Club, remaining with the club until 1936. He was also captain of the Deanery Cricket Club and Secretary of Hampshire County Cricket Club until 1936, when he retired and was succeeded by Alistair MacLeod.
- Daniel Ralph Ruffell (1867–1940) was an engineer in Southampton Docks. He continued to play for the club until injury ended his career in 1894.
- Alfred Alphonse Varley (1867–1905) remained with the club until 1888, playing in the final of the Hampshire Junior Cup. He was later assistant secretary at the Royal Southern Yacht Club.

== Notes ==
- ^a The precise date of the meeting is not known, nor are any minutes of the meeting now available.
- ^b Arthur Baron Sole was born in June 1853 at St. Neots, then in Huntingdonshire. After graduating in 1877 from Jesus College, Cambridge, with a degree in mathematics, he spent a year at Leeds Clergy School before becoming curate at St. Mary's Church, Southampton. He was appointed rector of St. Thomas's, Winchester in 1886 and Rural Dean of Winchester in 1901. He died, aged 50, on 14 December 1903 from a stroke.
- ^c The headlines for both match reports mistakenly refer to "St. Mary's Y.M.C.A.". The Young Men's Association had no connection with the Y.M.C.A., although this error has often been repeated in histories of the club.

== Bibliography ==
- Bull, David; Brunskell, Bob (2000). Match of the Millennium. Hagiology Publishing. ISBN 0-9534474-1-3.
- Chalk, Gary; Holley, Duncan (1987). Saints – A complete record. Breedon Books. ISBN 0-907969-22-4.
- Chalk, Gary; Holley, Duncan; Bull, David (2013). All the Saints: A Complete Players' Who's Who of Southampton FC. Southampton: Hagiology Publishing. ISBN 978-0-9926-8640-6.
- Gibbons, Philip (2001). Association Football in Victorian England – A History of the Game from 1863 to 1900. Upfront Publishing. ISBN 1-84426-035-6.
- Holley, Duncan (2012). Suited and Booted. Bristol: Hagiology Publishing. ISBN 0-9534474-9-9.
- Holley, Duncan; Chalk, Gary (1992). The Alphabet of the Saints. ACL & Polar Publishing. ISBN 0-9514862-3-3.
- Juson, Dave; Bull, David (2001). Full-Time at The Dell. Hagiology Publishing. ISBN 0-9534474-2-1.
