= 1886–87 St. Mary's Y.M.A. season =

English football club season

St. Mary's Y.M.A.
1886–87 season
- President: Canon Basil Wilberforce
- Secretary: George Muir
- Ground: Southampton Common
- Top goalscorer: League: N/A; All: Ned Bromley (5)
Home colours

1886–87 was the second year since St. Mary's Y.M.A. (now Southampton Football Club), based in Southampton in Southern England, started playing association football. This was a year of consolidation before the club entered its first local cup tournament in the following season. All the matches played during the season were friendly matches.

== Personnel ==
There were few changes to the Y.M.A.'s squad of players from the previous, inaugural season, with the most notable newcomers being J. L. Sommerville and Mullens, while Charles "Ned" Bromley replaced A. A. Fry as team captain. The players continued to play in white knickerbockers and white shorts with a red sash being sown diagonally across it.

== Venue ==
The club played their "home" games on Southampton Common although a practice match on 2 October 1886 was played in the grounds of the Deanery, opposite St.Mary's Church. This is the only match known to have been played by the club in the parish of St. Mary's.

== Matches ==
The club played 13 known friendly games of which nine were won and two were lost. Two matches were played against Handel College producing the biggest victories of 4–0 and 5–1. The most difficult opposition were Bannister Court, who inflicted one of the two defeats, and Southampton Harriers, who defeated the Y.M.A. 2–0 in the final match of the season, after two previous draws. Other matches were played where the results have been lost, including matches at Cowes and Winchester.

In the summary of the season, the St. Mary's Parish News claimed that the football club were "winning golden opinions throughout the town and neighbourhood (for being) victorious all along the line."

=== Results ===
The results of those matches that are known were as follows:

| Date | Opponents | H / A | Result F – A | Scorers |
|---|---|---|---|---|
| 16 October 1886 | Southampton Harriers | H | 1 – 1 | Muir |
| 20 November 1886 | Freemantle | H | 2 – 0 | Sommerville, McIvor |
| 27 November 1886 | Bannister Court | A | 1 – 2 | Sommerville |
| 4 December 1886 | Handel College | A | 4 – 0 | Sommerville, Bromley (2), Hitchcock |
| 15 December 1886 | Caledonians | H | 3 – 0 | Bromley (2), Deacon |
| 18 December 1886 | Southampton Harriers | H | 0 – 0 | |
| 22 January 1887 | Freemantle | H | 1 – 0 | Varley |
| 29 January 1887 | Greenhill Rovers | H | 2 – 0 | McDonald, Sommerville |
| 12 February 1887 | Freemantle | A | 3 – 0 | Bromley, Noble (2) |
| 16 February 1887 | Handel College | H | 5 – 1 | Deacon, Sommerville, Bromley, Hickman (2) |
| 26 February 1887 | Cowes | H | 1 – 0 | Muir |
| 12 May 1887 | Southampton Harriers | H | 0 – 2 | |
| 19 March 1887 | Greenhill Rovers | H | 2 – 0 | Steele, Warn |

==== Legend ====
| Win | Draw | Loss |

== Other local clubs ==
Apart from the opponents listed above, the other major association football club in the Southampton area was a team from Woolston Works, who played at Woolston Park, across the River Itchen from the town. The works team comprised employees of the Oswald, Mordaunt & Co. shipyard in Woolston, which later became part of Vosper Thorneycroft. Many of the workers had been recruited from the north of England and Scotland who had previously played football in their home towns.

They entered the South Hants & Dorset Senior Cup, which the Y.M.A. were precluded from entering as they did not have access to an enclosed ground. The works team defeated the Portsmouth Sunflowers 6–1 on 9 October 1886. The Sunflowers were run by Canon Norman Pares, who had played for the Old Etonians when they won the 1879 FA Cup Final. The Works team progressed to the final where they defeated Wimborne Town with a single goal. The umpire for the final was M. P. Betts who won the very first FA Cup Final with the Wanderers in 1872.

Woolston Works also reached the final of the Portsmouth & District Cup where they lost 2–0 to Portsmouth A.F.C. (not connected with the present-day Portsmouth Football Club). Playing in goal for the Portsmouth side was "A. C. Smith", a pseudonym for Dr. Arthur Conan Doyle.

== Players ==
The following is known about the players who made their debut this season:

- J. L. Sommerville joined the club in the summer of 1886 and was a frequent goal-scorer. His last known appearance was in the Hampshire Junior Cup final in March 1888.
- M. Warn arrived towards the end of the 1886–87 season and remained with the St. Mary's club until 1891, with his last competitive appearance being in the 1890 final of the Hampshire Junior Cup.

== Bibliography ==
- Chalk, Gary; Holley, Duncan (1987). Saints – A complete record. Breedon Books. ISBN 0-907969-22-4.
- Juson, Dave; Bull, David (2001). Full-Time at The Dell. Hagiology Publishing. ISBN 0-9534474-2-1.
