= 1887–88 St. Mary's Y.M.A. season =

English football club season

St. Mary's Y.M.A.
1887–88 season
- Honorary President: Canon Basil Wilberforce
- Secretary: George Muir
- Ground: Southampton Common
- Hampshire Junior Cup: Winners
- Top goalscorer: League: N/A; All: Ned Bromley (7)
Home colours

1887–88 was the third season for St. Mary's Young Men's Association Football Club (St. Mary's Y.M.A.) based in Southampton in southern England. The club entered, and won, the Hampshire Junior Cup in its inaugural year, thus laying the foundation for success over the next two decades.

== Summary of the season ==
The 1887–88 season saw the St. Mary's club start to evolve from a church youth club side playing friendly matches on the local common into the dominant team in Southampton, who would play in front of paying crowds. Two years after being founded, the club began to embrace professionalism and move away from its roots, gradually severing its connection to St. Mary's Church to become a more secular organisation, eventually dropping references to the Young Men's Association becoming simply St. Mary's Football Club and, at the same time, acquiring the nickname, "the Saints" which remains to the present day.

== Personnel ==
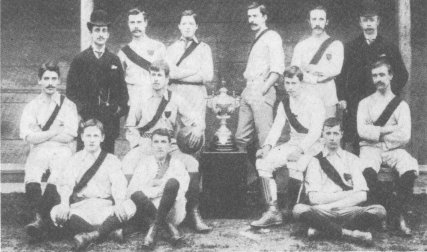
The first known photograph of the St. Mary's team taken two weeks after the Hampshire Junior Cup final. (Standing: F. J. Montgomery, G. Carter, M. Warn, J. L. Sommerville, A. A. Fry, G .C. Gandy. Sitting: A. Varley, Ned Bromley (Capt.), G. Muir, A. Gandy. On ground: C. Deacon, F. J. Crossley, R. Ruffell.) Picture by F. G. O. Stuart.

The most significant new arrival was George Carter: Carter was employed as an engraver by the Ordnance Survey and in 1887 he was posted to their offices in Southampton. Speaking in 1999, Carter's daughter-in-law, Nellie Carter, said that Carter was "not at all happy" about being posted to Southampton and that Carter maintained that the move was arranged by Dr. Russell Bencraft who was medical officer at the Ordnance Survey and was later to become the president of Southampton St. Mary's F.C. As secretary of the Hampshire County Cricket Club, Bencraft was also a colleague of Col. James Fellowes, who was an assistant to the Director-General of the Ordnance Survey. It would seem, therefore, that Carter was transferred to Southampton as a quasi-professional footballer.

Canon Basil Wilberforce continued as the president of the club, although this was an honorary position, with Dr. Bencraft, a "highly-active" member of the committee, acting as "de facto" president. Wilberforce left the parish of St. Mary's in 1894, after which Bencraft became the official club president. George Muir, a schoolteacher, also continued to act as the club secretary as well as being "ever-present" on the pitch.

== Strip ==
The players continued to wear white shorts, black knee-length socks and "white tunics" with a red sash worn diagonally. A photograph taken after their victory in the Hampshire Junior Cup in March 1888 shows the sashes worn from either shoulder in a rather haphazard fashion.

== The Hampshire F.A. ==
In April 1887, the South Hants & Dorset F.A. was dissolved to be replaced by two separate county associations. The newly formed Hampshire Football Association held its first meeting on 20 April at the Spartan Club in Southampton High Street when St. Mary's were represented by Messrs. Varley and Bromley.

In September, the Hampshire F.A. announced the creation of two cup tournaments, the Hampshire Senior Cup and the Hampshire Junior Cup; St. Mary's Y.M.A. entered into the latter competition. The trophy was a silver cup provided by Charles Baring Young, the Member of Parliament for Christchurch.

In the first edition of the Hampshire Football Association Handbook, the club is listed as St. Mary's Young Men's Association FC with their home ground at Southampton Common.

== Hampshire Junior Cup ==
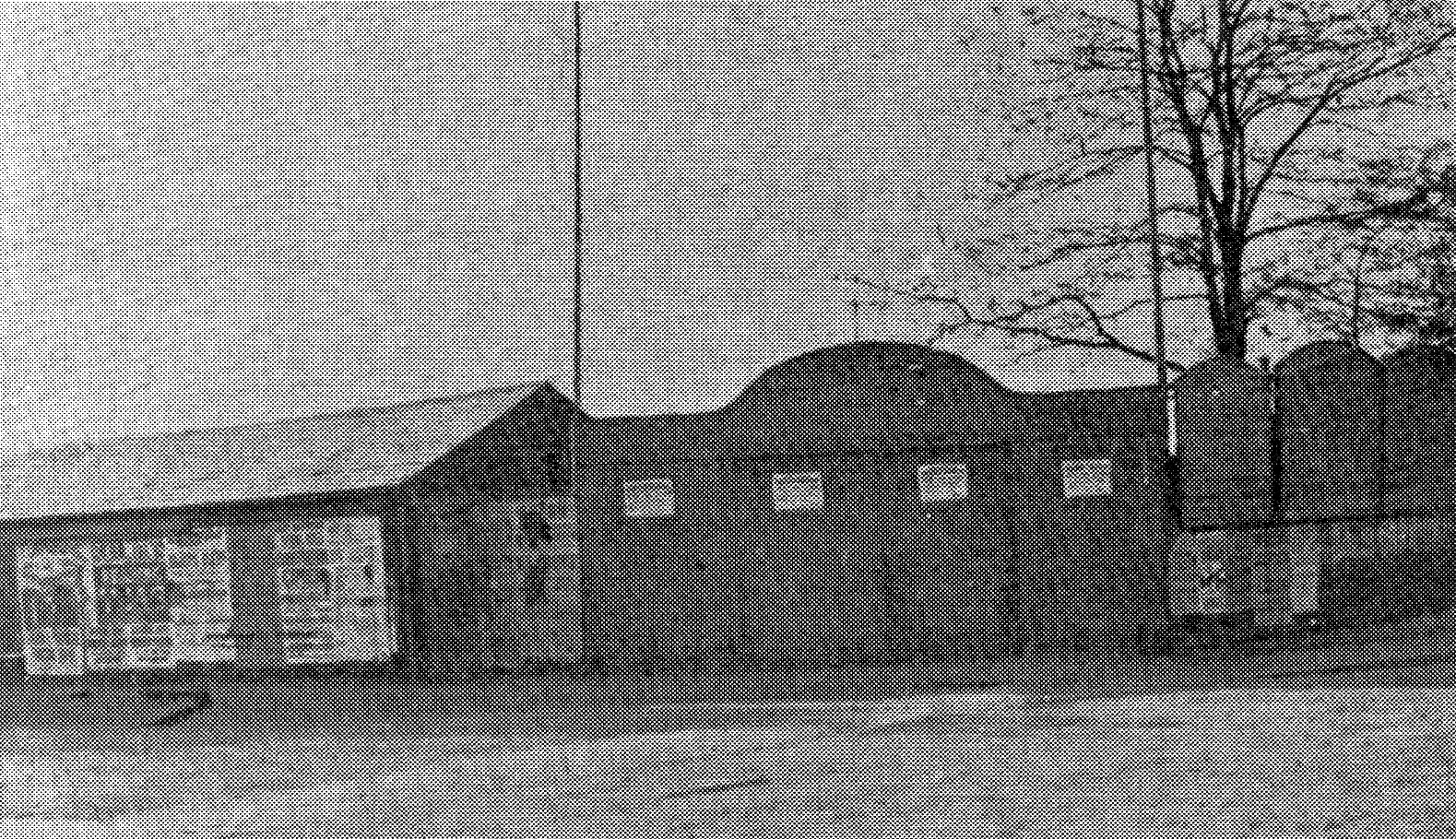
The entrance to the Antelope Ground.

Under the rules of the Hampshire cup tournaments, the cup-ties had to be played in an enclosed ground for which an admission fee could be charged, thus precluding the club from playing their cup matches on Southampton Common.

This problem did not arise with the first round match, when the club were drawn to play at Totton who had only been formed the year before but had the use of a field within the grounds of a private estate at South Testwood Park. The report on the match published in the Southampton Times complemented the hosts on their ground which "in spite of the recent unfavourable weather, was in splendid condition, and the Totton club have good reason to congratulate themselves on having the privilege of playing their matches on such an excellent ground". The report went on to explain that, despite the visitors dominating the first half of the match, the score was 0–0 at half-time. In the second-half, "A. A. Fry ran the whole length of the field before landing the ball directly in front of his captain, just a few yards out – Bromley simply couldn't miss". This being the only goal, St. Mary's went through to the next round where they had a home draw against Petersfield.

As the Common was not suitable for a cup-tie, the St. Mary's committee secured the use of the Antelope Ground, "by kind permission of the Pirates". The Pirates were a rugby club who shared the ground with a football team from Woolston Works. The Antelope Ground, which stood on the east side of St Mary's Road between Brinton's Terrace and Clovelly Road, had previously been used by Hampshire County Cricket Club until they moved to the County Ground in Northlands Road in 1885.

The visitors could only muster ten men, and had two of their best players absent, and the Saints won easily, 10–0, with five goals from A. A. Fry and five from Ned Bromley.

In the next round, the Saints received another home draw against Lymington; the Pirates already had a fixture on the date of the match (21 January 1888), so the match was played on the pitch behind the Anchor Hotel, Redbridge, four miles from the town centre. The match was won 4–0, but some of the Saints' fans misbehaved; their "hilarious" behaviour was such that the owner of the ground (a Mr. Steadfast) demanded that the gate receipts should be paid to the Royal South Hants Hospital.

The semi-final draw gave St. Mary's a match against the Bournemouth Arabs and was played at the County Ground on 18 February 1888. The "Arabs" were a strong side and took the lead, after which Carter and Muir in defence ("certainly the best on the field" according to the Southampton Times) prevented them from playing other than by shots from distance. The equaliser came from McDonald before, late in the second-half, Bromley "dribbled in great style down the field, and put the ball through for St. Mary's", thus securing a place in the final.

The final was played on 10 March 1888 at the County Ground against Southampton Harriers, another strong local side who played their home matches on Southampton Common, having been founded as the Temperance Amateur Athletic Association, but changed their name in 1885. Many of the Harriers players had "transferred" from the Freemantle club in the summer of 1887, following the failure of the latter club to enter either Hampshire cup competition.

The Southampton Times estimated the crowd for the final at approximately 600, despite the "threatening" weather. St. Mary's fell behind early in the game and were 2–0 down at half-time but fought back to draw level at 2–2, with goals from Warn and Ned Bromley who unleashed a "splendid shot" with three minutes left to play. The match report in the Bournemouth Guardian however claimed that St. Mary's had scored a third goal but failed to claim it, as required by the rules "to the astonishment of both umpires and referee". In the absence of goal nets, the ball had crossed the line, but the Harriers "kicked off from the six yards' mark and no claim was made by St. Mary's for the point. I can't imagine how the Saints, who must be kicking themselves with chagrin at the slip, lost sight of the goal. I don't think they will get the chance again."

The captains debated playing an extra half-hour to settle the match but George Noble, the Harriers' captain, refused as two of his players were carrying minor injuries.

The replay was played two weeks later, again at the County Ground in front of a crowd of "over 500 people, exclusive of the ladies who, bless 'em, are admitted free." St. Mary's took a 2–0 lead through McDonald and Warn (after some "pretty passing") before the Harriers pulled one back. The report in the Southampton Times concluded: "Soon the final whistle sounded leaving "Saints" victorious by two goals to one. Though the Harriers played a great game, the St. Mary's played better football." The cup was presented to the "Saints" captain, Ned Bromley, with each of the winning team being presented with a silver medal "in commemoration of the match".

Following the match, the Harriers team dissolved with most of their players returning to Freemantle, although the Harriers' centre-half William "Banquo" Stride joined St. Mary's.

=== Results ===
Date	Round	Opponents	H / A	Result F – A	Scorers	Attendance
26 November 1887	1st	Totton	A	1–0	N. Bromley	
17 December 1887	2nd	Petersfield	H	10–0	Deacon, A. A. Fry (5), N. Bromley (4)	
21 January 1888	3rd	Lymington	H	4–0	F. Bromley, A. Gandy, McDonald (2)	
18 February 1888	Semi-final	Bournemouth Arabs	N	2–1	McDonald, N. Bromley	
10 March 1888	Final	Southampton Harriers	N	2–2	N. Bromley, Warn	600
24 March 1888	Final replay	Southampton Harriers	N	2–1	McDonald, Warn	600

==== Legend ====
Win	Draw	Loss

== Friendly matches ==
St. Mary's continued to play friendly matches throughout the season, although reports are not available for many of these. For example, there were two matches against Cowes on the Isle of Wight, including an away victory a week before the initial Hampshire Junior Cup match.

The final match of the season was played at the Antelope Ground on 14 April 1888 against Woolston Works who had won the inaugural Hampshire Senior Cup. The clubs had decided that they should compete to decide which was Southampton's top club. The home side were victorious by three goals to nil; the Bournemouth Guardian report on the match summed up the clubs' season:

Both teams have had a wonderfully good time of it on the whole and the people of Southampton ought to feel proud of their football population.

=== Results ===
The results of the friendly matches that are known were as follows:

Date	Opponents	H / A	Result F – A	Scorers
19 October 1887	Handel College	A	3–2	Warn (2), N. Bromley
29 October 1887	Southampton Harriers	H	1–0	N. Bromley
27 November 1887	Freemantle	H	1–0	N. Bromley
4 February 1888	Freemantle	A	0–3	
11 February 1888	Totton	A	4–1	Carter, A. A. Fry, N. Bromley (2)
14 April 1888	Woolston Works	A	0–3	

== Club name and nickname ==
As recorded in the Hampshire F.A. handbook, at the start of the season the club were registered as St. Mary's Young Men's Association FC. By the end of the season, however, all match reports had dropped references to the "Young Men's Association" and the club were recorded as simply St. Mary's Football Club.

The club had originally been founded by members of the St. Mary's Young Men's Association in 1885 and the members were expected to be practicing members of the Church of England, and participate in Bible classes and teach in Sunday School. The recruitment of players such as George Carter, who had been signed for his abilities as a footballer rather than a Sunday School teacher, indicated a shift away from this policy. In January 1888, Canon Basil Wilberforce convened a meeting of the Young Men's Association which resolved:

that St. Mary's Church of England Young Men's Association should, in future, consist only of members who are either active workers in some branch of the parochial organization, or regular attendants at one of the Bible classes. For the purpose of effectively carrying this out, it was resolved to make a fresh enrolment of all those who desire to belong to the Association on this understanding.

There is no record of how many of the football club members confirmed their membership of the Young Men's Association and it seems that the church and parish were happy for the football club to continue under the banner of "St. Mary's", with Canon Wilberforce continuing as club president until he left the parish in 1894. In the April parish magazine, the football club's achievements were reported in glowing terms:

S. MARY'S FOOTBALL CLUB – We are glad to record a great triumph for the above club, which has now, by following up its many victories won the much coveted "Cup" for the year. We cordially congratulate them on their success.

By the end of the season, match reports were also referring to the club as "the Saints"; the first known record of this was on the day of the initial Hampshire Junior Cup final when the Southampton Times reported: "The Saints journeyed to Cowes on Saturday to decide the return match with the town club." This nickname continues to be used today.

== Player statistics ==
The players who appeared in the Hampshire Junior Cup were as follows. This list does not include appearances or goals in friendly matches.

Position	Name	Apps	Goals
FW	Ned Bromley	6	7
HB	Frank Bromley	1	1
FB	George Carter	6	0
FW	F. J. Crossley	3	0
HB	Charles Deacon	5	1
FW	A. A. Fry	6	5
HB	A. G. Fry	2	0
HB	Alfred Gandy	4	1
FW	George C. Gandy	2	0
FW	R. McDonald	4	4
FB	George Muir	6	0
GK	Ralph Ruffell	6	0
FW	J. L. Sommerville	4	0
HB	A. Varley	5	0
FW	M. Warn	6	2

=== Key ===
- GK — Goalkeeper
- FB — Full back
- HB — Half-back
- FW — Forward

== Players ==
The following is known about the players who made their debut this season:

- Frank Bromley was the brother of Ned Bromley. He played as a forward and remained with the club until 1891, helping them win the Hampshire Senior Cup.
- George Carter (1867–1945) worked for the Ordnance Survey. He joined the club in 1887 and remained with them as a player until 1894, after which he became reserve team manager.

== Bibliography ==
- Bull, David; Brunskell, Bob (2000). Match of the Millennium. Hagiology Publishing. ISBN 0-9534474-1-3.
- Chalk, Gary; Holley, Duncan (1987). Saints – A complete record. Breedon Books. ISBN 0-907969-22-4.
- Holley, Duncan (2012). Suited and Booted. Bristol: Hagiology Publishing. ISBN 0-9534474-9-9.
- Holley, Duncan; Chalk, Gary (1992). The Alphabet of the Saints. ACL & Polar Publishing. ISBN 0-9514862-3-3.
- Juson, Dave; Bull, David (2001). Full-Time at The Dell. Hagiology Publishing. ISBN 0-9534474-2-1.
