= Frederic Crossley =

English footballer

Personal information
- Full name: Frederic James Crossley
- Date of birth: 7 May 1870
- Place of birth: Richmond, England
- Date of death: 1960s (age 89–99)
- Place of death: Whanganui, New Zealand
- Positions: Inside forward; wing half

Senior career*
| Years | Team | Apps | (Gls) |
| 1887–1889 | St. Mary's | 0 | (0) |
- * Club domestic league appearances and goals

Frederic James Crossley (7 May 1870 – 1960s) was an English footballer. Born in Richmond, Surrey, he played four games for St. Mary's YMA in the Hampshire Junior Cup, primarily as a left-half, between 1887 and 1888.

== Life and career ==
Crossley made his debut for St. Mary's YMA in their first ever Hampshire Junior Cup match on 26 November 1887, playing at inside-right in the 1–0 victory over Totton. He played at left-half in the final against Southampton Harriers, which ended in a 2–2 draw, but did not feature in the replay two weeks later. Crossley returned at left-half in the first match of the following season's cup run against Havant, but retired from football shortly thereafter. After emigrating to New Zealand's North Island in 1890, he worked as a carpenter in Cardiff and later a farmer in Kapuni, before retiring to Whanganui where he would die in the 1960s.

== Career statistics ==
| Season | Club | Hampshire Junior Cup | | Total | |
| Season | Club | Apps | Goals | Apps | Goals |
|---|---|---|---|---|---|
| 1887–88 | St. Mary's | 3 | 0 | 3 | 0 |
| 1888–89 | St. Mary's | 1 | 0 | 1 | 0 |
| St. Mary's total | | 4 | 0 | 4 | 0 |
