= Alfred Fry =

English footballer

Personal information
- Full name: Alfred George Fry
- Date of birth: January–March 1864
- Place of birth: Southampton, England
- Date of death: 15 May 1930 (aged 66)
- Place of death: Southampton, England
- Position: Half-back

Senior career*
Years	Team	Apps	(Gls)
	Southampton Harriers	0	(0)
1885–1888	St. Mary's	0	(0)
- * Club domestic league appearances and goals

Alfred George Fry (1864 – 15 May 1930) was an English footballer. Born in Southampton, Fry was one of the first players for St. Mary's Y.M.A. (later renamed St. Mary's), between 1885 and 1888, playing as a half-back.

== Life and career ==
Originally from Southampton, Alfred Fry was one of the first players to join St. Mary's Y.M.A., playing in the team's first match in November 1885. Primarily a half-back, Fry made two competitive appearances in the club's third season, in the 1–0 win over Totton and the 10–0 win over Petersfield, both in the Hampshire Junior Cup. Following his retirement from football, Fry went on to become a "prominent builder" in the area; he died in 1930, aged 66.

== Career statistics ==
Season	Club	Hampshire Junior Cup		Total	
Season	Club	Apps	Goals	Apps	Goals
1887–88	St. Mary's	2	0	2	0
St. Mary's total		2	0	2	0
