= Ernest Mate =

English footballer

Personal information
- Full name: Ernest Lewis William Mate
- Date of birth: 18 December 1870
- Place of birth: Sandwich, Kent, England
- Date of death: 14 December 1947 (aged 76)
- Place of death: Ealing, London, England
- Position: Outside forward

Senior career*
Years	Team	Apps	(Gls)
	United Banks	0	(0)
1888	St Mary's	0	(0)
- * Club domestic league appearances and goals

Ernest Lewis William Mate (18 December 1870 – 14 December 1947) was an English footballer who played one game for St Mary's in 1888.

== Club career ==
Born in Sandwich, Kent, Ernest Mate was a bank clerk by trade who initially played football for amateur side United Banks. He made a single appearance for St Mary's on 24 November 1888 in the 5–0 Hampshire Junior Cup first round win over Havant at the County Ground, before returning to non-league football.
