= Christ Church, Freemantle =

Parish church in Hampshire, England

Coordinates: 50.9115°N 1.4279°W

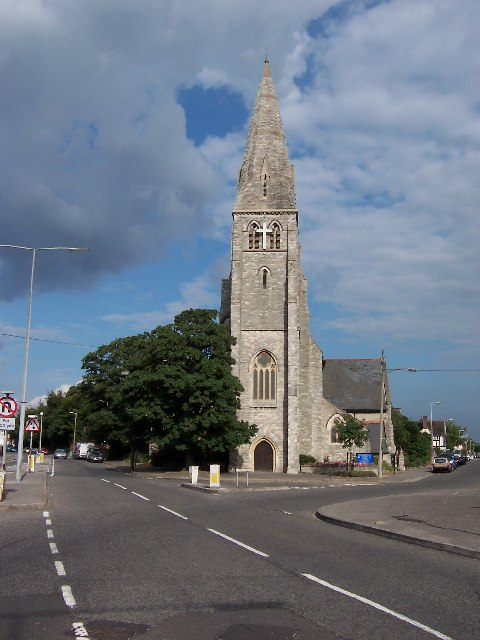

Christ Church is the parish church for Freemantle in Southampton. The church building is listed Grade II on the National Heritage List for England.

== History ==
The origins of a church community in Freemantle begin in 1856, when a church meeting took place in the Bailiffs House, and then later church services took place in the school rooms. On 25 July 1861, the foundation stone of the church was laid by Archdeacon Jacob. The building was constructed of Purbeck rubble and ashlar during 1865-1866 by William White. The windows were moulded with red brick. On 27 July 1865 the church was consecrated by Dr Sumner, Bishop of Winchester. On 19 April 1866 the Ecclesiastical Commission of England agreed that Freemantle would be a separate district from Millbrook, and declared the new Church of the Parish of Christ Church, Freemantle. The tower and spire were added in 1875.

== Architecture ==
The main building is of Purbeck rubble and ashlar construction, with red brick mouldings around the windows. The building has a nave with a clerestory, chapels to the north and south, and a south porch. The tower, on the west of the building, has a broached spire which was added a decade after the construction of the remainder of the building. The chancel arch is wide, with three bay nave arcades. The windows are of a geometrical style.
