= F. G. O. Stuart =

Scottish photographer

- Born: Francis Godolphin Osbourne Stuart c. 1843; Braemar, Aberdeenshire, Scotland
- Died: 1923 (aged c. 79–80); Southampton, Hampshire, England

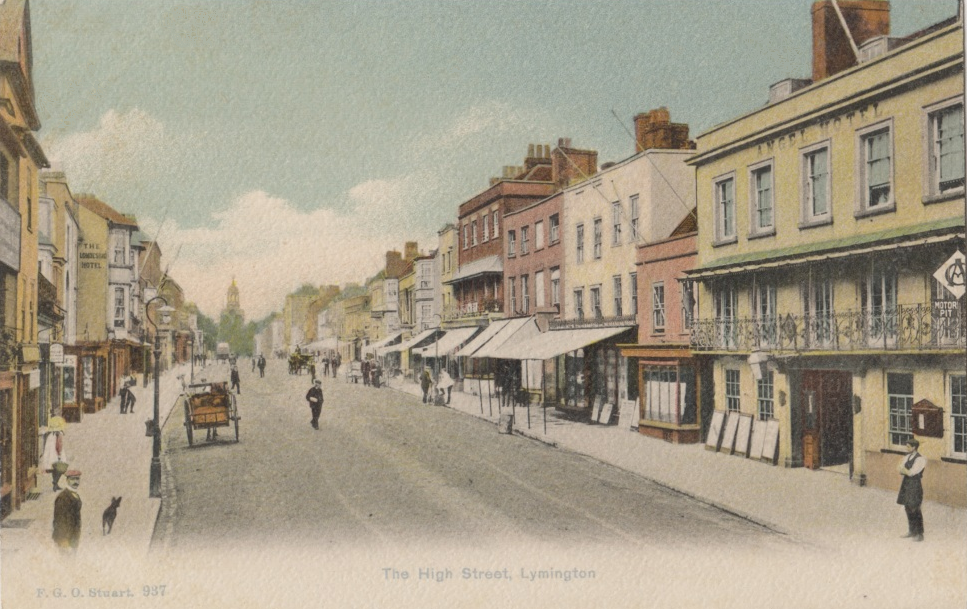
The High Street, Lymington, by Stuart, postcard printed in colour

Francis Godolphin Osbourne Stuart (c. 1843–1923) was a Scottish photographer. Commonly referred to as F. G. O. Stuart, he was born in Braemar, Aberdeenshire. Stuart worked as a photographer in Aberdeen and London, before settling in Southampton by about 1881 (appearing in the 1881 census). He is best known as a photographer and publisher of picture postcards, mainly of images of southern England, with the first cards appearing about 1901. On his death in 1923 at home in Southampton, his son-in-law Charles Dowson took over the family business and carried on until the 1930s. Stuart regularly took team photographs in the early days of Southampton Football Club.

This was the "Golden Age" of picture postcards, and over 2500 postcards were produced by Stuart (and later Dowson), primarily depicting images of a topographical nature, often in the Southampton area. Stuart himself (or his pony and cart) can often be seen in the street scenes. Early Stuart postcards were printed in Germany and are renowned for the quality of the print and vibrancy of the colours. With the outbreak of war in 1914, printing moved to England and there was a notable decrease in the quality of the cards produced. Trimmed cards can sometimes be seen where the publisher has trimmed the 'Printed in Germany' mark from the side of the card. During the war Stuart acted as the official port photographer, recording damage to shipping and Southampton docks.

Stuart's commercial premises in Southampton were at 57, 59 and 61 Cromwell Road, Southampton.
