= Ralph Ruffell =

English footballer

Personal information
- Full name: Daniel Ralph Ruffell
- Date of birth: 3 October 1867
- Place of birth: Southampton, England
- Date of death: 3 October 1940 (aged 73)
- Place of death: Southampton, England
- Position: Goalkeeper

Senior career*
Years	Team	Apps	(Gls)
1885–1894	Southampton St. Mary's	0	(0)
- * Club domestic league appearances and goals

Daniel Ralph Ruffell (3 October 1867 – 3 October 1940) was an English amateur footballer who played as a goalkeeper for Southampton St. Mary's from their inaugural fixture in November 1885 until 1894, including making six appearances in the FA Cup.

== Football career ==
Ruffell was born in Southampton and was associated with St. Mary's Church; the St Mary's Church of England Young Men's Association decided to arrange a football match against Freemantle, which took place on 21 November 1885 on a pitch in Northlands Road, where the Hampshire Bowling Club was subsequently situated, close to the County Cricket Ground, with Ruffell playing in goal. The "Saints" won the match 5–1 with three goals from Ned Bromley and two from Arthur Fry; Freemantle's goal was an own goal when the ball came off a defender's legs after a corner.

Ruffell remained with the "Saints" for nearly ten years and helped the club grow rapidly to participate in the Hampshire Junior Cup, which was won in 1888, 1889 and 1890, followed by the Hampshire Senior Cup (winners in 1891 and 1892, and losing finalists in 1893 and 1894), before participating in the FA Cup for the first time in 1891. Throughout this time Ruffell was the first-choice goalkeeper, and played in every cup match until October 1892.

In the FA Cup, the "Saints" reached the Second Qualifying Round for each of the three seasons from 1891–92 to 1893–94 with Ruffell in goal for all six matches. In the Hampshire Senior Cup final played on 10 March 1894, Ruffell sustained a dislocated knee cap in the 1–0 defeat by the Royal Engineers which ended his playing career, although he continued to make occasional reserve-team appearances.

== Later career ==
Ruffell was employed as an engineer in Southampton Docks. He died in Southampton on his 73rd birthday, 3 October 1940.
