= William Pickford =

Football administrator (1861–1938)

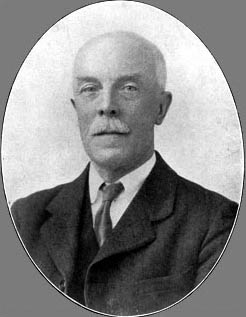
- Born: 1861; Lancashire, England
- Died: 5 November 1938 (aged 76–77); Bournemouth, England
- Education: The Congregational School, Lewisham (later Caterham School)
- Notable work: President of The Football Association

William Pickford (1861–1938) was an English football administrator, who played an important role in the early development of The Football Association, in which he was its most recent President not to come from the British royal family.

== Early life ==
Pickford was born in Lancashire and from 1873 to 1878, attended the Congregational School at Lewisham, which later became Caterham School. During his time there, he was initially interested in rugby before, in 1878, he was invited to attend a football match between Blackburn District and Bolton. Remembering this later, Pickford wrote:

I fell in love with "soccer" at once. The players were not bunched together half the time in struggling heaps, but each man in his place, like chessmen, and the footcraft, passing and speed fascinated me.

He joined a local club where he became a regular goalscorer for the reserve team and was soon promoted to the first team. Having lived in Bournemouth with his family as a nine-year-old he returned there in his early 20s where he joined Bournemouth Rovers.

== Football administrator ==
Pickford was employed by the Bournemouth Guardian as a bookkeeper before being asked to write reports on local football matches. He became aware of the South Wilts Football Association and suggested that a similar organisation should be formed to administer football in the area around Bournemouth. In 1884, at a meeting held at Wimborne, the "South Hants and Dorset Football Association" was formed. This association lasted three years before two separate associations were formed in 1887, with the Hampshire F.A. being responsible for the administration of football throughout Hampshire and the Isle of Wight.

Pickford was Secretary of the newly formed Hampshire F.A. and became its treasurer the following year, retaining this post until near the end of his life. He played a large part in the spread of interest in football in Hampshire and was considered the "father of football in Hampshire", his name being "synonymous with football in Hampshire".

He soon became involved in football at a national level, becoming a member of the council of the Football Association. He became a Vice-President of FIFA and a member of the International FA Board before becoming president of the Football Association in 1937, until his death the following year. As such, he was the last commoner to hold this position, with all subsequent presidents being members of royalty.

In 1902, Pickford was responsible for the introduction of markings on the pitch, marking the penalty area, the penalty spot and the goal area.

== Referee ==
Pickford was also a prominent referee in Hampshire, taking charge of Hampshire Junior Cup and Hampshire Senior Cup finals. He became Vice-President of the Referees Association (formed in 1893), becoming treasurer from 1908 to 1914. In 1895, Pickford was instrumental in the Society producing "The Referees' Chart, 1895–96"; this contained 17 Laws (or rules) and was far more substantial than the original rules, laid down in 1863.

In 1906, he wrote "How to Referee", in which he set out the rules of the game and gave advice such as:

Don't forget that players are not machines, but are human, and possess a keen sense of injustice.

Don't let criticism hurt you, some people rejoice to see a referee writhe under it. It tickles them, and really if you are a good referee it cannot harm you.

Don't be afraid, but be bold and fear not.

Don't worry your head about the noise spectators kick up. Free Britons have queer ways of enjoying themselves.

Don't go on refereeing if your eyesight gets bad, or you get old and slow.

== Death and legacy ==
William Pickford died at his home in Bournemouth on 5 November 1938.

In 1996, the Hampshire F.A. marked Pickford's contribution to the game, both locally and nationally, by naming their new headquarters in Winchester Road, Southampton after him. Ten years later, the Hampshire F.A. moved their headquarters to Basingstoke, and "William Pickford House" was sold to Hilton-Baird Financial Solutions.

== Bibliography ==
- Bull, David; Brunskell, Bob (2000). Match of the Millennium. Hagiology Publishing. ISBN 0-9534474-1-3.
- Gannaway, Norman (2009). William Pickford: A Biography. Hampshire F.A. ISBN 978-0-9561223-0-8.
- Holley, Duncan (2012). Suited and Booted. Bristol: Hagiology Publishing. ISBN 978-0-9534474-9-7.
- Juson, Dave (2004). Saints v Pompey – A history of unrelenting rivalry. Hagiology Publishing. ISBN 0-9534474-5-6.
