= Woolston Works F.C. =

Woolston Works
- Full name: Woolston Works Football Club
- Founded: 1878; 148 years ago (as "Southampton Rangers")
- Dissolved: 1889; 137 years ago
- Ground: Antelope Ground, Southampton
Home colours

Woolston Works Football Club is a defunct football club formerly based at Woolston, Hampshire which was active from the late-1870s until 1889. The club pre-dates Southampton Football Club in whose early years the two clubs vied for dominance in Southampton.

== History ==
The team was founded as "Southampton Rangers" in 1878 and comprised employees of the Oswald, Mordaunt & Co. shipyard in Woolston, which later became part of Vosper Thornycroft. Many of the workers had been recruited from the north of England and Scotland who had previously played football in their home towns. In their early days, the team played their home matches on Southampton Common before moving to Woolston Park.

Writing in 1936, William Pickford, who had helped found the Hampshire F.A. in 1887 before going on to become president of The Football Association, said:

The effect of this galaxy of Scotsmen on the game in Hampshire was electifying. Up to then, few local people knew anything about the fine points of the game, and the public troubled little about it as a spectacle. The opening of the Woolston Shipyard turned Southampton into an association (football) hot-bed, and it woke up with a start.

In 1886, Woolston Works entered the South Hants & Dorset Senior Cup, defeating the Portsmouth Sunflowers 6–1 in the First Round on 9 October 1886. The Sunflowers were run by Canon Norman Pares, who had played for the Old Etonians when they won the 1879 FA Cup Final. The Works team progressed to the final where they defeated Wimborne Town with a single goal. The umpire for the final was M. P. Betts who won the very first FA Cup Final with the Wanderers in 1872.

Woolston Works also reached the final of the Portsmouth & District Cup in 1887, where they lost 2–0 to Portsmouth A.F.C. (not connected with the present-day Portsmouth Football Club). Playing in goal for the Portsmouth side was "A. C. Smith", a pseudonym for Dr. Arthur Conan Doyle.

In 1887, the club became joint tenants with the Pirates Rugby Club of the Antelope Ground. The Antelope Ground, which stood on the east side of St Mary's Road between Brinton's Terrace and Clovelly Road, had previously been used by Hampshire County Cricket Club until they moved to the County Ground in Northlands Road in 1885.

In the same year, the club entered the inaugural Hampshire Senior Cup (whereas St. Mary's Y.M.A. entered the Junior Cup), as the South Hants and Dorset competition had split between the two counties. In the final, they defeated Winchester by two goals to nil to claim the trophy. With St. Mary's winning the Junior Cup, the two clubs decided that they should compete to decide which was Southampton's top club. The match was played at the Antelope Ground on 14 April 1888 and the home side were victorious by three goals to nil; the Bournemouth Guardian report on the match summed up the clubs' season:

Both teams have had a wonderfully good time of it on the whole and the people of Southampton ought to feel proud of their football population.

In 1888–89, Woolston Works continued to occupy the Antelope Ground, sharing this with the Trojans Rugby Club. reached the final of the Hampshire Senior Cup, where they lost to a team from the Royal Engineers based at Aldershot, By now, Oswald, Mordaunt & Co. were in financial trouble as a result of which many of their better footballers had returned to their native north-east and Scotland, causing the works to put out a weakened team for the final.

The Woolston shipyard was closed in April 1889 and Oswald, Mordaunt & Co. was wound up, resulting in the disbanding of the football team.

== Later teams ==
During the First World War, a team from the works, now owned by John I. Thornycroft & Company was formed, known as Thornycrofts (Woolston) F.C.. They survived until 1926 and reached the First Round Proper of the F.A. Cup in 1919–20 where they took Burnley of the Football League First Division to a replay.

In 1960, Vosper Thornycroft F.C. was founded. They subsequently changed their name to VT F.C. and then to Sholing F.C. who now play in the Southern League Division One South & West.

== Colours ==
The club's dominant jersey was black and white hoops.

== Bibliography ==
- Chalk, Gary; Holley, Duncan (1987). Saints – A complete record. Breedon Books. ISBN 0-907969-22-4.
- Collett, Mike (2003). The Complete Record of the FA Cup. Sports Books. ISBN 1-8998-0719-5.
- Juson, Dave; Bull, David (2001). Full-Time at The Dell. Hagiology Publishing. ISBN 0-9534474-2-1.
- Leonard, A. G. K. (Winter 2010). "The speculatively-built ships of Oswald, Mordaunt and Company" (PDF). Southampton Local History Forum Journal. No. 16.
