= Charlie Deacon =

English footballer

Personal information
- Full name: Samuel Charles Deacon
- Date of birth: January–March 1869
- Place of birth: Farnham, England
- Date of death: 21 October 1893 (aged 24)
- Place of death: Southampton, England
- Position: Half-back

Senior career*
Years	Team	Apps	(Gls)
1885–1892	St. Mary's	0	(0)
- * Club domestic league appearances and goals

Samuel Charles Deacon (1869 – 21 October 1893) was an English footballer who played as a half-back. Originally from Farnham, Deacon was one of the first players for St. Mary's Y.M.A. (later renamed St. Mary's), between 1885 and 1892.

== Playing career ==
While working as a clerk at the Southampton Telegraph Office, Deacon joined the football team of the St. Mary's Young Men's Association in November 1885, playing in their first game at the age of 16. Described by the local press as one of the team's "phenomenal juniors", Deacon helped St. Mary's win the Hampshire Junior Cup three seasons running in 1887–88, 1888–89, and 1889–90, playing in 15 of the 17 games during this period, mostly at right-half.

In the following two seasons, Deacon played mainly at centre-half, as St. Mary's won the Hampshire Senior Cup twice and the Hampshire County Cricket Club Charity Cup once. He died in October 1893 of a brain tumour.

== Career statistics ==
Season	Club	Hampshire Junior Cup		Hampshire Senior Cup		Hampshire CCC Charity Cup		Total	
Season	Club	Apps	Goals	Apps	Goals	Apps	Goals	Apps	Goals
1887–88	St. Mary's	5	1	—		—		5	1
1888–89	St. Mary's	7	1	—		—		7	1
1889–90	St. Mary's	3	0	—		—		3	0
1890–91	St. Mary's	—		3	0	2	0	5	0
1891–92	St. Mary's	—		2	1	1	0	3	1
St. Mary's total		15	2	5	1	3	0	23	3
