= Ned Bromley =

English footballer

Personal information
- Full name: Charles Edward Bromley
- Date of birth: 1869
- Place of birth: Southampton, England
- Date of death: 1 April 1942 (aged 72)
- Place of death: Darlington, England
- Position: Forward

Senior career*
Years	Team	Apps	(Gls)
1885–1889	St. Mary's	0	(0)
- * Club domestic league appearances and goals

Charles Edward Bromley (1869–1 April 1942) was an English footballer. Originally from Southampton, he played as a forward for local side St. Mary's between their formation in 1885 and 1889.

== Life and career ==
Born between April and June 1869, Bromley joined the football team of the St. Mary's Young Men's Association upon its formation in November 1885. He played in the team's first game, a friendly match against Freemantle, By 1887, Bromley had become the captain of St. Mary's, leading the side to the final of the 1887–88 Hampshire Junior Cup, where the Saints beat the Southampton Harriers 2–1 in a replay after a 2–2 draw; the forward scored seven goals throughout the course of the tournament, including four in the second round 10–0 win over Petersfield.

Following the club's Hampshire Junior Cup victory, Bromley relinquished his captaincy and moved to London to study dentistry, although he continued to play for St. Mary's. In the following season, Bromley continued to be "almost ever-present" in the team's lineup as they retained the Hampshire Junior Cup, scoring three goals in six appearances in the tournament, including one in the 3–0 final win over Christchurch. Shortly after the cup final, Bromley suffered a "serious leg injury" during a six-a-side tournament, bringing his playing career to an end.

After his injury, Bromley focused on his dental career, later moving to Chester and Gibraltar; he died in Darlington in 1942.

== Career statistics ==
Season	Club	Hampshire Junior Cup		Total	
Season	Club	Apps	Goals	Apps	Goals
1887–88	St. Mary's	6	7	6	7
1888–89	St. Mary's	6	3	6	3
St. Mary's total		12	10	12	10

== Bibliography ==
- Bull, David; Brunskell, Bob (2000). Match of the Millennium. Hagiology Publishing. ISBN 0-9534474-1-3.
- Chalk, Gary; Holley, Duncan (1987). Saints – A complete record. Breedon Books. ISBN 0-907969-22-4.
- Chalk, Gary; Holley, Duncan; Bull, David (2013), All the Saints: A Complete Players' Who's Who of Southampton FC, Hagiology Publishing, ISBN 978-0-9926864-0-6
- Juson, Dave; Bull, David (2001). Full-Time at The Dell. Hagiology Publishing. ISBN 0-9534474-2-1.
