= Arthur Fry (footballer) =

English footballer

Personal information
- Full name: Albert Arthur Fry
- Date of birth: April–June 1861
- Place of birth: Portsmouth, England
- Date of death: 13 March 1937 (aged 75)
- Place of death: Southampton, England
- Positions: Forward; goalkeeper; full-back

Youth career
- Culham College
- Deanery

Senior career*
Years	Team	Apps	(Gls)
1885–1891	St. Mary's	0	(0)
- * Club domestic league appearances and goals

Albert Arthur Fry (1861 – 13 March 1937) was an English footballer. Originally from Portsmouth, Fry was one of the first players for St. Mary's Y.M.A. (later renamed St. Mary's), between 1885 and 1891, playing in a number of different positions including forward and goalkeeper.

== Life and career ==
Originally from nearby Portsmouth, Arthur Fry (nicknamed "Father Fry" by his teammates) was one of the first players to join St. Mary's Y.M.A., playing in the team's first match in November 1885 holding the role of team captain. A versatile footballer, Fry played in "nearly every position" for the Saints, including goalkeeper; playing as a centre forward, he scored five goals in a 10–0 win over Petersfield in the Hampshire Junior Cup in December 1887, a club record for goals by a single player in a cup match which was later equalled by Derek Reeves in 1960.

Following his retirement from football in 1891, Fry worked as a teacher at various schools in Southampton, including as the headmaster of Foundry Lane School for 22 years from 1902 until his retirement in 1924. Shortly after attending the Golden Jubilee of the club in 1935, Fry died in March 1937 at the age of 75.

== Career statistics ==
Season	Club	Hampshire Junior Cup		Hampshire Senior Cup		Total	
Season	Club	Apps	Goals	Apps	Goals	Apps	Goals
1887–88	St. Mary's	6	5	—		6	5
1888–89	St. Mary's	7	2	—		7	2
1889–90	St. Mary's	1	0	—		1	0
1890–91	St. Mary's	—		1	0	1	0
St. Mary's total		14	7	1	0	15	7
