= Basil Wilberforce =

English Anglican priest (1841–1916)

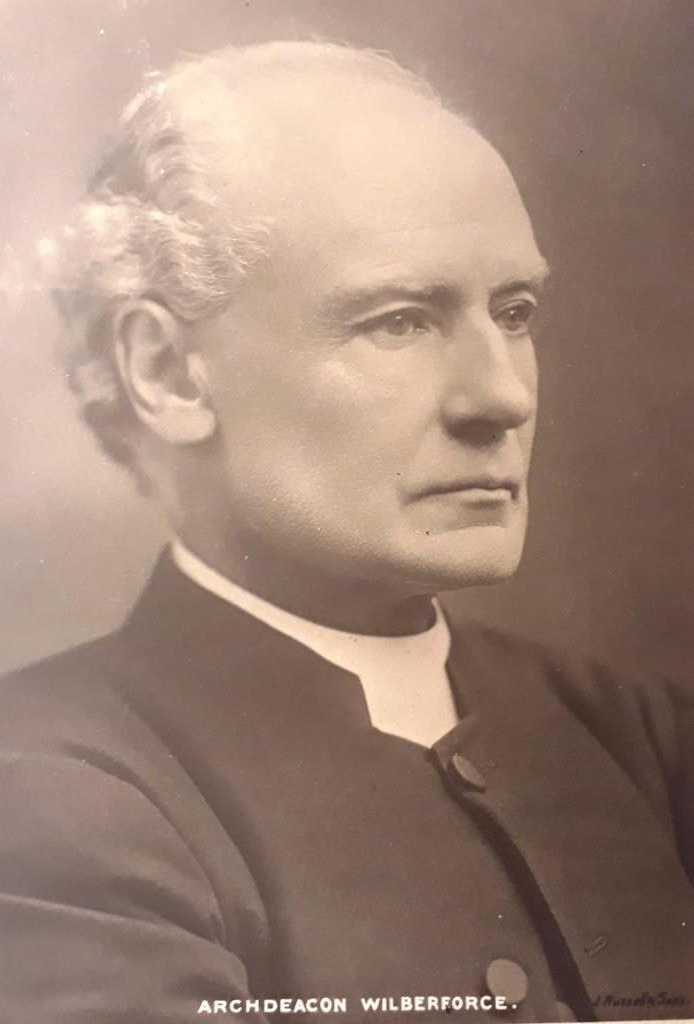
- Wilberforce in 1900
- Born: Albert Basil Orme Wilberforce; February 14, 1841
- Died: May 13, 1916 (aged 75)
- Burial place: Westminster Abbey
- Occupations: Priest and author
- Years active: 1866–1916
- Parents: Samuel Wilberforce (father); Emily Wilberforce (mother)
- Relatives: William Wilberforce (grandfather); Ernest Wilberforce (brother)

Albert Basil Orme Wilberforce (14 February 1841 – 13 May 1916) was an Anglican priest and author in the second half of the 19th century and the first two decades of the 20th. He was the Chaplain to the Speaker of the House of Commons and Archdeacon of Westminster.

== Biography ==
=== Early life ===
He was born in Winchester, the third son of Samuel Wilberforce; Ernest Wilberforce was his elder brother. He was educated at Eton College and matriculated at Exeter College, Oxford in 1860, graduating B.A. in 1865 and M.A. in 1867. He was ordained in 1866.

=== Career ===
He was chaplain to the Bishop of Oxford and then held curacies at Cuddesdon, Seaton and Southsea. He was Rector of St. Mary's, Southampton from 1871 to 1894, and an Honorary Canon of Winchester. In April 1894 he was appointed Canon of Westminster Abbey and Rector of the parish church of St John the Evangelist, annexed to Westminster.

He was appointed Chaplain to the Speaker of the House of Commons in 1896, and continually re-elected to the post until his death in 1916. Biographer Charlotte Elizabeth Woods wrote that "[f]ew Chaplains have filled this time-honoured post with so much dignity, grace, and distinction."

In 1900 he was appointed the Archdeacon of Westminster.

=== Personal life ===
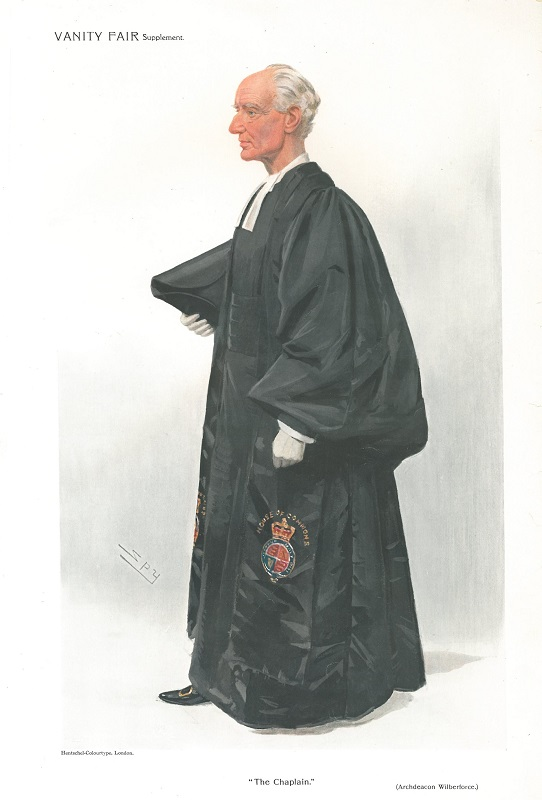
"The Chaplain", caricature of Wilberforce by "Spy" in Vanity Fair, 1909.

He married Charlotte Langford on 28 November 1865 at St Paul's Church, Knightsbridge. Both of them were supporters of the Broadlands conference on spiritualism.

He was a strong supporter of the temperance movement, and abstained from all alcohol after 31. He was good friends with temperance leader Lady Henry Somerset.

He died on 13 May 1916. He was 75.

== Partial list of published works ==
- The battle of the Lord. (London : Elliot Stock)
- The established church and the liquor traffic : being a letter addressed to His Grace the Archbishop of Canterbury.
- Important correspondence with Canon Wilberforce on vivisection. (Boston, Mass.)
- Mystic Immanence, the Indwelling Spirit.
- New (?) theology : thoughts on the universality and continuity of the doctrine of the immanence of God. (London : Stock) 1908
- Our Father's Lent and His Easter land. (Butler & Tanner)
- The secret of the quiet mind. (London : E. Stock)
- Seeing God : personal recognition of divine love. (London : Elliot Stock)
- Sermon preached to the 2nd special service battalion of the Royal Canadian regiment, in Westminster Abbey, on Advent Sunday.
- Spiritual consciousness. (New York : Dodd, Mead)
- There is no death. (New York : Dodd, Mead)
- The trinity of evil : I. infidelity, II. impurity, III. intemperance. (Toronto : S.R. Briggs) 1885
- Why does not God stop the war?. (London : Elliot Stock)
- Down in the Depths: The Awakening of the Spirit.
- Following on to Know. 1904
- Speaking Good of His Name. 1905
- Sanctification by the Truth. 1906
- The Hope that is in me. 1909
- The Power that Worketh in us. 1910
- Sermons preached in Westminster Abbey. 1898 (1st series), 1902 (2nd series)
