= Southampton Common =

Public park in Southampton, England

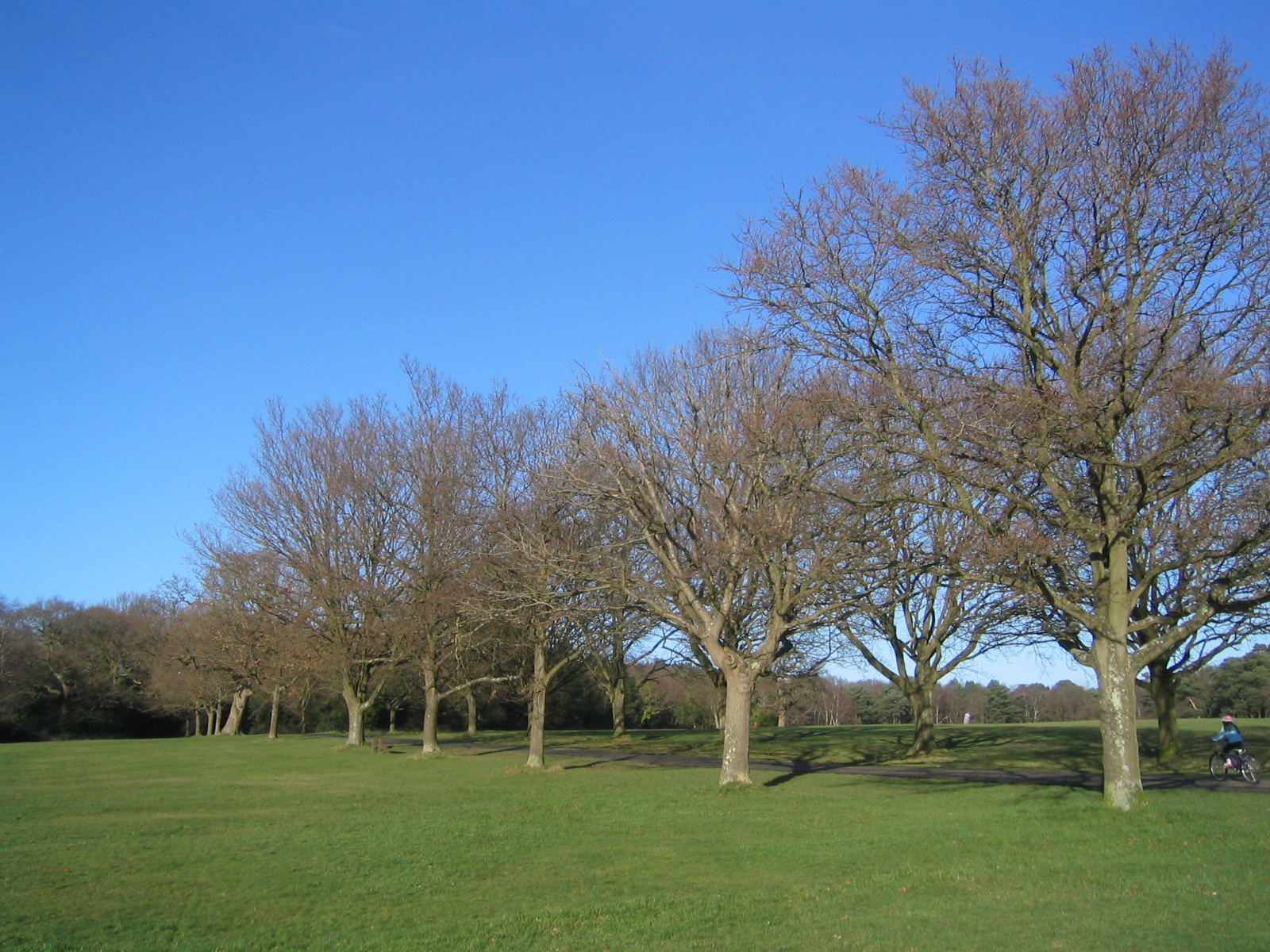
- Southampton Common, January 2005

- Location within Southampton
- Type: Common land / Public park
- Location: Southampton
- Coordinates: 50°55′34″N 1°24′39″W
- Area: 365 acres (148 ha)
- Created: Unknown. First documented 13th century as common land 1844 as public park
- Operator: Southampton City Council
- Open: All year
- Status: Green Flag Award; Site of Special Scientific Interest
- Southampton Common
- Site of Special Scientific Interest
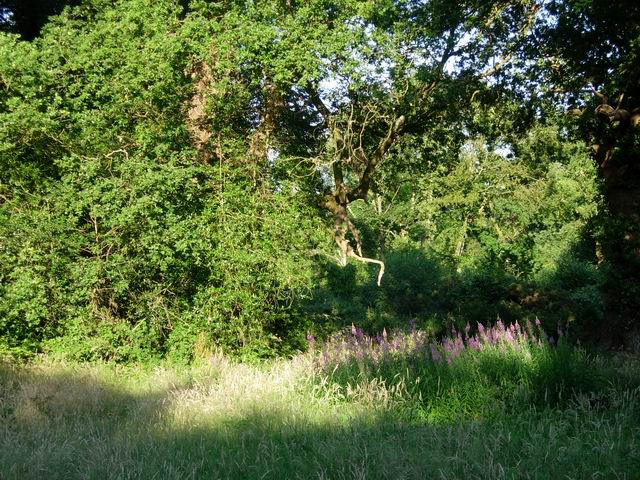
- Area of search: Hampshire
- Grid reference: SU 414 146
- Interest: Biological
- Area: 223 acres (90.3 hectares)
- Notification date: 1987
- Location map: Magic Map

Southampton Common is a large open space to the north of the city centre of Southampton, England. It is bounded by the districts of Shirley, Bassett, Highfield and Portswood. The area supports a large variety of wildlife, including one of the largest populations in Britain of the nationally rare great crested newt. The Common is used for community events, Flower Festival, Race for life Cancer Research UK and formerly 'Power in the Park' hosted by Power FM.

An area of 223-acre (90.3-hectare) is a biological Site of Special Scientific Interest.

== Layout ==
Southampton Common currently includes 365 acres (148 ha) of woodland, parkland, rough grassland, ponds, wetlands, nature trails, a children's play area, a model yachting lake, and a fishing lake.

The Hawthorns Urban Wildlife Centre at the southern end has been built on the former site of Southampton Zoo and has displays about the natural history of the area. To the west, bordering on Hill Lane, is Southampton Old Cemetery, with many rare flora and fauna. Cemetery Lake is popular for birdwatching.

The south east of the Common includes a play area for children with sand and water play. This is near a car parking zone and the Cowherds Inn, a local landmark which has a history going back to the 17th century.

The A33 road between Southampton and Winchester runs through the common. The section through the common is known as the Avenue. In 1760 it was straightened by the Southampton to Winchester turnpike trust. Since at least 1763 trees have been deliberately planted alongside the road. The Avenue was praised by William Gilpin in 1798, and described in a 1967 book by J. P. M. Pannell, the engineer to the Port of Southampton Harbour Board, as "one of the finest town approaches in Britain, if not the world".

There are a number of streams on the common that are collectively part of the Rollesbrook catchment. An artificial connection to Freemantle stream that runs to the ornamental lake has also been created. The mainline of the Rollesbrook rises slightly to the south of Cutthorn Mound at the northern end of the common. It flows in a general south westerly direction, passing under the Avenue and being joined by several tributaries before leaving the area via the southern side of the cemetery.

== History ==
Paleolithic artifacts including axes have been found in gravel pits on the common as well as a single Mesolithic axe. An assembly of bronze age axes has also been found on the common.

It has been suggested that the area's status as a common goes back to the town of Hamwic around 500AD.

The documented history of Southampton Common can be traced back to a dispute over land rights in the 13th century. The dispute (which also included land beyond the common) was between the Lord of the manor of Shirley – one Nicholas de Sirlie – and the Burgesses of Southampton. The dispute was resolved on 13 May 1228 by the Borough agreeing to make a small payment to Nicholas de Sirlie and withdrawing any claims over the land that became known as Shirley Common. In return Nicholas de Sirlie renounced any claims over Southampton common and accepted that rights of common would be limited to those living within the borough boundaries.

The designation as Common Land allowed all householders within the borough who were paying "watch and ward" to use the land for fuel, clay, and taking berries and other wild, natural food. The most important use was for grazing, however, and there was a cowherd, who was paid to be responsible for the cattle on the common. As well as looking after the cattle, it was the cowherd's job to perform maintenance on the gates, fences, and banks on the common. In the 17th century, the cowherd was paid 2d per cow but, was required to rent a house on the common for 20 shillings per year. The job of the cowherd was often performed by the same family from generation to generation, and the office was sometimes held by a woman such as Elizabeth Fawkens, who was the widow of the previous cowherd. She held the office for five years from 1675.

By the mid 16th century the rising population of the Borough resulted in commoners being limited to having no more than two animals on the common. At the same time the first reference to a brickmaker living and working on the common appear. The area around the original brickmaker's house was worked out by the early 18th century resulting in the house being moved to site near the current wildlife center. This site was worked out by 1814.

In 1595 the first attempt to supply Southampton with water was made by Roger Pedley. This attempt was only partially successful and was disrupted a year later by a Mr Robert Russell digging on the common.

The use of the common for grazing declined from the mid 18th century. In 1762 the cowherd's house was rebuilt at the expense of Alderman William Knight who agreed to pay for the building on the condition that the rent (which was then raised to £6 a year) was distributed among the poor of Southampton's parishes. In order to meet this higher rent the cowherd began to sell alcoholic beverages and refreshments. In 1774 the office of cowherd was taken over by a brewer and in 1789 the cowherd's house was leased by the town council to a firm of brewers as an inn. The cowherd ceased to be appointed sometime between 1834 and 1836 with the remaining duties falling to the Haywarden until that office also stopped being filled in 1907. The last brickmaking on the common ceased in 1852 although the brick maker had ceased to live on the common after 1814.

For a period the town gallows were located on the north of Southampton Common with the last execution taking place there in 1785.

=== 19th century ===
In 1814 the town clerk managed to get permission to build a house on the common on the site of the former brickmaker's house. This house, known as Hawthorn cottage, was sold in 1851 to and again in 1887 and continued to be occupied until 1942.

A racecourse was built in on the common in 1822 but, with falling attendances, the various structures on the course had to be sold off in 1848 to meet the costs, and it ceased to be used.

In 1843 10 acres (4.0 ha) of the common was split off by the Southampton Corporation to be used a cemetery. The power to do this was provided by the Southampton Cemetery Act 1843 which allowed up to 15 acres (6.1 ha) to be taken. The Cemetery opened in 1846 and is now known as Southampton Old Cemetery. A further 5 acres (2.0 ha) was taken from the common and added to the cemetery in 1863. In 1884 an act of parliament was obtained to transfer another 12 acres (4.9 ha) to the cemetery.

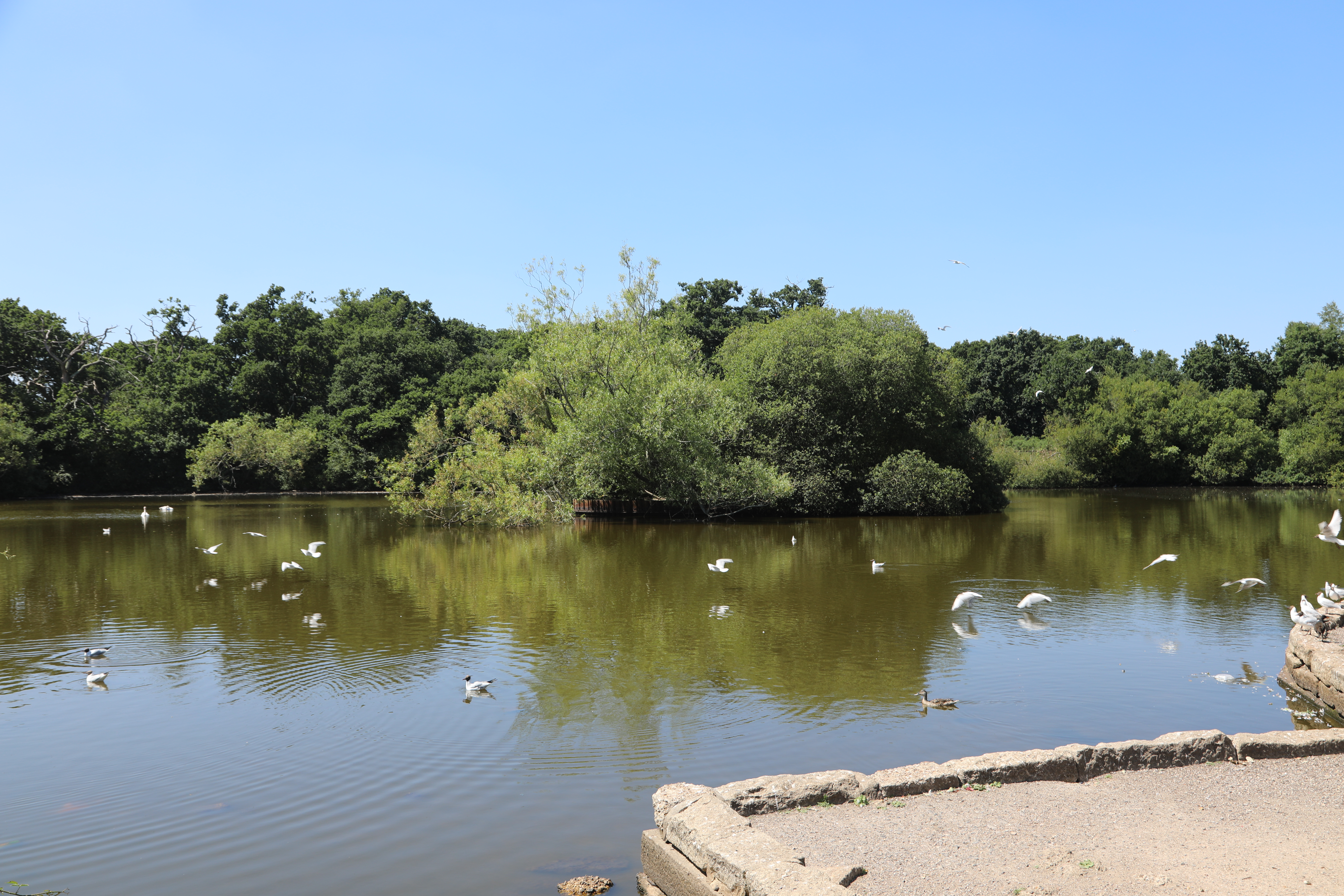
Southampton Common Cemetery lake

The common became a public park in 1844 as the result of the council using the powers of the Southampton Marsh Act 1844.

The racecourse on the common was rebuilt in 1860 and races continued to be held until 1881. In the mid-1860s a cricket pitch was constructed within the racecourse with upgrades taking place in 1874. In the same year the council gave permission for a golf course to be constructed on the common.

The first agricultural show was held on the common in 1873 in the form of the Royal Counties Agricultural Society show. From then on large shows either from the Royal Counties Agricultural Society or the Bath and West of England Society took place every few years.

The first non-reservoir pond on the common appeared sometime between 1800 and 1846 and was just beyond what was then the Cemetery's north east corner. This pond disappeared with the 1884 expansion of the cemetery. Separately, a few years before the expansion, a disused gravel pit had filled with water to the point it became a rough pond. In 1881 it was decided to form this pond into cemetery lake essentially by tidying it up and making more controllable connections to the streams on the common.

In 1888 the council decided to construct a second lake known as the Ornamental Lake in part as a job creation scheme. The lake was constructed in a crescent shape divided into two levels with a dam with a waterfall separating the two.

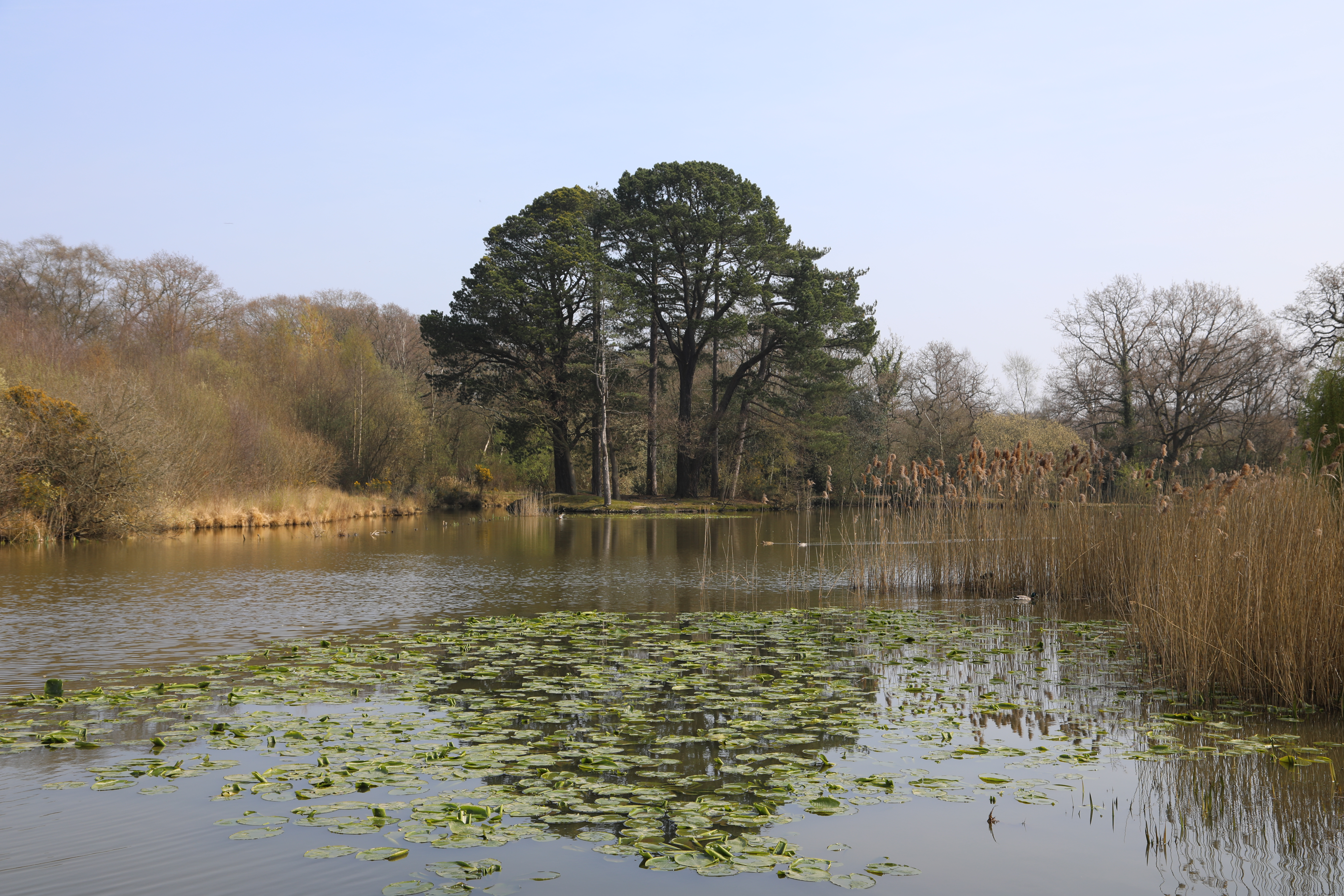
Southampton Common ornamental lake

In 1892 a small hospital was built on the common for cholera and smallpox cases. It was soon judged unsuitable and was removed by the end of the year. The council instead purchased City of Adelaide to use as a hospital ship.

==== Waterworks ====
In 1803 the first of a number of reservoirs was constructed by the Southampton Waterworks Commissioners. The reservoir was constructed behind the Cowherd's inn. The second reservoir to be built on the common was constructed in 1830 just to the north of the initial reservoir and a third was added in 1831.

In 1835 the Southampton Waterworks Commissioners decided to dig an artesian well on the common. Work started on the well in 1836 but stopped a year later. Work started again in 1842 but issues with the well producing only small amounts of water and disagreements between conservatives and radicals among the Southampton Waterworks Commissioners resulted in work stopping in 1845. Over the following decades occasional further drilling took place on the well with the final work being carried out in 1883 reaching a depth of 1,317 feet (401 m).

In 1850 a further pair of reservoirs was constructed on the northern part of the common this time to hold water taken from the River Itchen at Mansbridge. The power to do this came from Southampton Waterworks Amendment Act 1850. Water stopped being transferred from Mansbridge in 1892 and the reservoirs were converted to covered reservoirs in 1895. Meanwhile, the reservoir behind the Cowherd's inn (the first reservoir constructed on the common) was filled in in 1871. The second and third reservoirs continued to see some use supplying water for watering the roads. The third reservoir was used for sailing model yachts from 1894 and in 1897 complaints over its condition resulted in the banks being rebuilt in concrete.

=== 20th century ===
During World War I, much of the common was taken over by the military. This marked the end of golf being played on the common. A large number of huts were constructed on the common and it was used as a rest camp for troops preparing to leave the country via the Port of Southampton. The common was returned to the council in 1919 and the remaining military buildings were removed over the next two years.

In the 1920s football was being widely played on the common with 30 pitches in use. On top of this five cricket pitches were constructed between 1926 and 1932. The demand for sporting facilities on the common declined with the opening of Southampton Sports Centre in 1938.

During World War II the common was again taken over by the military and again huts were constructed on the common. While it was mostly used as a camp by various allied forces a prisoner of war camp was also set up on the common. The common continued to be used as a transit camp after the war and was returned to the civilian authorities in a rather piecemeal manner with the final part being handed over in August 1950. During this period a number of huts were taken over by squatters. In particular a camp to the north east of the common (officially Camp C18 but it became known as the Squatters's Camp) ended up being run by Southampton housing department. The last of the squatted huts were cleared at the end of January 1953. A further four huts (originally part of Camp C19) were used by the local education system until being removed in October 1970.

Hawthorn cottage which had been empty since 1942 was purchased by the council in 1945. By that point it was in rather a poor state so it was demolished and the area was used as a tree nursery.

In 1947 the annual Southampton Horticultural Show and fete began being held on the common. In 1952 it was renamed to the Southampton Show. In 1988 the show transitioned into the Balloon & Flower Festival.

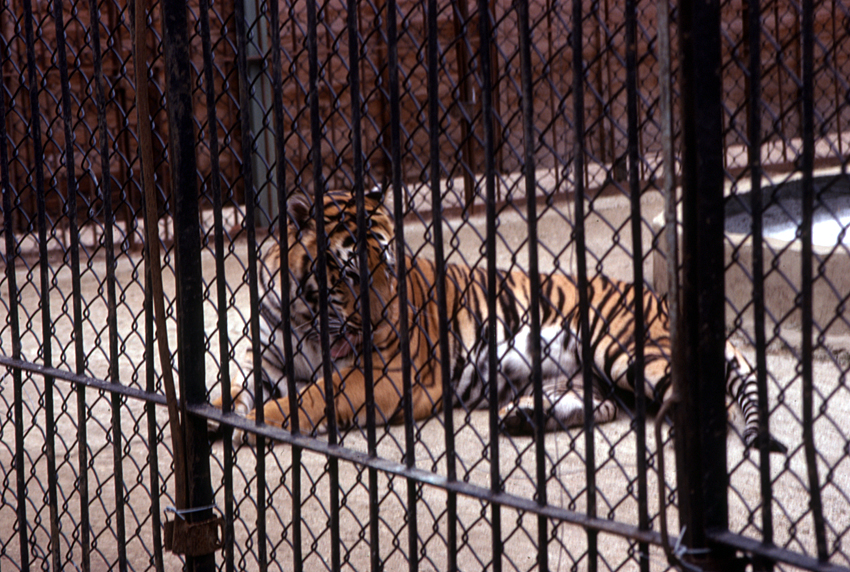
Tiger at Southampton Zoo in 1981

In 1961 the 1.25 acres (0.51 ha) Southampton zoo was opened on the common using the site of the former Hawthorn cottage. Poor conditions at the zoo under Mary Chipperfield’s management led to protests in the early 80s including a march to Hoglands Park. As a result, the zoo closed in 1985. An application was then made to turn the site into a small theme park based around a big wheel. This was rejected and instead the council used the site to construct the Hawthorns Urban Wildlife Centre.

In 1968 the council proposed to construct two new car parks on the common. This proposal was challenged in the High Court by the Southampton Commons and Parks Protection Society, the Southampton Civic Trust and the Friends of Old Southampton. The council lost the case and as part of the proceedings it became clear that in general driving motor vehicles on the common was illegal under the Southampton Corporation Act 1931. Since this banned the various vehicles used to maintain the common as well as those used in setting up fairs Southampton council decided to obtain a new act of Parliament; the Southampton Corporation Act 1971. The 1971 act was later replaced with the Hampshire Act 1983. In 1984 a second court case took place over the use of the common. This time it was over the question of if the common could be used to host Mission Solent (a subset of Billy Graham's Mission England). The act stated that sections of the common could be closed for fairs, shows circuses or other functions of like nature. The court ruled that the religious event was not of like nature and could not be held on the common.

==== Waterworks ====
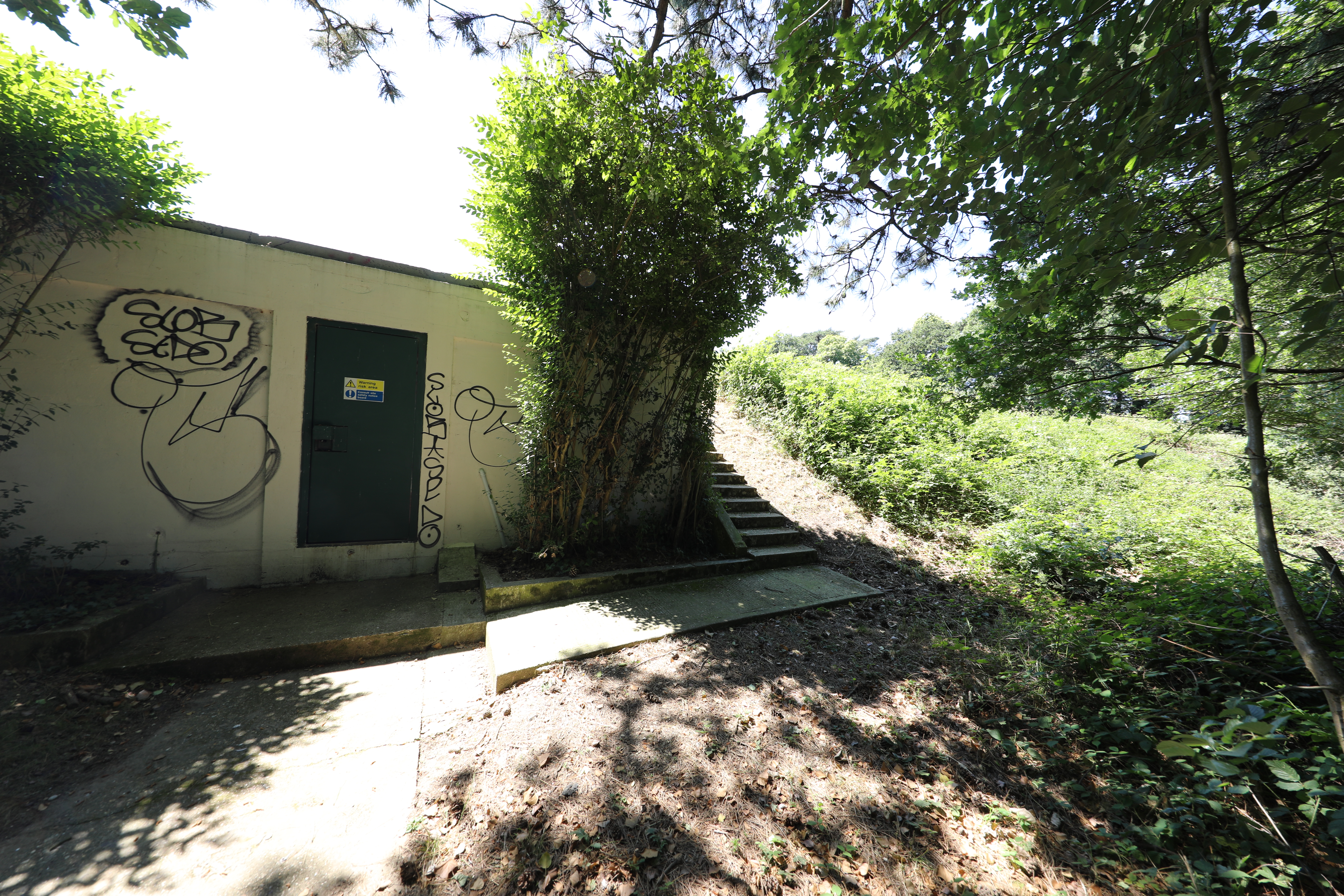
The exterior of the covered reservoir in 2018

In 1919 two drownings in the third reservoir (now the model yacht lake or boating lake) resulted in works that reduced its depth to four feet. The model yacht lake was supplied with water from and drained into the Rollesbrook stream.

Between 1934 and 1937 the second reservoir was converted into a paddling pool with a fountain at the centre. A feeder from the Rollesbrook stream was constructed but the pool was generally filled from the town's potable water system. Any overflow from the pool drained into the Rollesbrook stream.

Maintenance on the ornamental lake stopped during World War II resulting it becoming overgrown. The military occupying the common also blocked much of drainage system.

In 1952 the two covered reservoirs were merged into one.

In the 1980s the banks of the island on Cemetery Lake were reinforced in response to erosion.

Towards the end of 1983 and during the start of 1984 the ornamental lake was comprehensively dredged potentially doing significant damage to the wildlife in and around the lake. A plan to do the same to the boating lake was halted by the intervention of the Nature Conservancy Council. In 1985 silt traps were added to two of the streams flowing into the ornamental lake.

=== 21st century ===
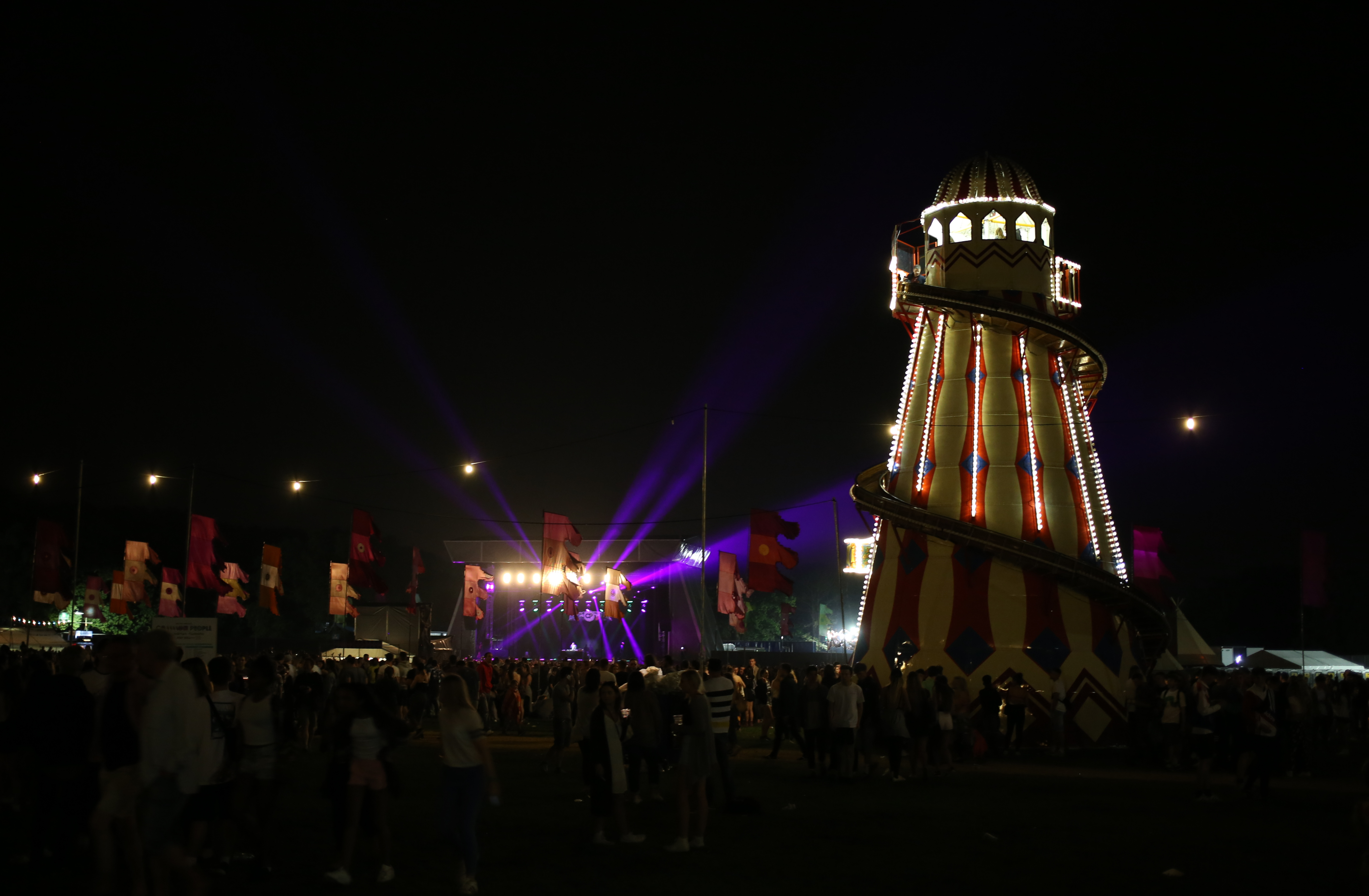
Common People music festival in 2016

The Balloon festival ceased to be held after 2005.

The Common People music festival was first held on the common in 2015 and was then held for a further three years. The Alt-J song "Bloodflood" makes reference to the Common.

The Common is the venue for a Parkrun; a weekly 5 km run on a Saturday morning starting from near the Hawthorns Centre. It is consistently one of the highest-attended Parkruns in the UK, often attracting well over 1000 participants.
