= 1895–96 Eastville Rovers F.C. season =

Eastville Rovers F.C.
1895–96 season
- Captain: Lewis John
- Ground: Ridgeway Road, Ridgeway, Bristol
- Western League: Joint runners-up
- FA Cup: Preliminary round
- Gloucestershire Senior Cup: Runners-up
- Top goalscorer: Howard Gallier (15)

The 1895–96 season was the thirteenth to be played by the team now known as Bristol Rovers, and their twelfth playing under the name Eastville Rovers. The first team played their fourth campaign in division one of the Western League (known in previous seasons as the Bristol & District League), while the reserves competed in the second division of the same competition for the third time. The season was notable for Rovers having entered the FA Cup for the first time in their history, and for the first team playing their 100th competitive match.

The senior squad finished the season as joint runners-up of the Western League first division after tying for second place in the table with Staple Hill and a playoff match to separate them ended in a draw, while the reserves ended their campaign in fifth place in division two. The first team were also runners-up in the Gloucestershire Senior Cup, losing out in the final to long-time rivals Warmley, but the campaign was marred by the death of an opposing player in their semi-final with Bedminster following a clash of heads.

The club's début in the FA Cup came in the preliminary round and ended in a 2–0 defeat, again to Warmley.

== Season review ==
The 1895–96 season began with the news that Lewis John had been appointed as the new club captain, replacing H. McBain who had been skipper the previous year.

Rovers started the season strongly, winning eight of their first nine games, although one of those victories was later expunged from the record after Cardiff were expelled from the league. Their form trailed off slightly after that, but they ended the season well enough to finish joint second place in the table. The Western League had decided that goal average would no longer be used to split teams tied on points and that a test match would be held to decide the finishing order. A match was duly arranged between Rovers and Staple Hill to determine who would be runners-up, but the game ended in a 2–2 draw, leading to the teams being named joint runners-up.

== League tables ==
=== Western League Division One ===
Pos	Team	Pld	W	D	L	GF	GA	GAv	Pts	
1	Warmley (C)	20	16	3	1	65	13	5.000	35	League champions
2	Eastville Rovers	20	14	1	5	57	22	2.591	29	Joint runners-up
3	Staple Hill	20	13	3	4	48	19	2.526	29	Joint runners-up
4	Trowbridge Town	20	13	1	6	50	31	1.613	27	
5	St George	20	10	4	6	47	38	1.237	24	
6	Clifton (Note: Clifton had two points deducted for breaching league rules)	20	8	3	9	44	50	0.880	17	
7	Gloucester	20	6	4	10	29	42	0.690	16	
8	Bedminster	20	6	2	12	36	41	0.878	14	
9	Swindon Wanderers	20	4	4	12	57	63	0.905	12	
10	Mangotsfield	20	3	3	14	17	54	0.315	9	
11	St Paul's	20	2	2	16	12	60	0.200	6	
12	Cardiff (D)	0	0	0	0	0	0	—	0	Record expunged

(C) Champions; (D) Disqualified

=== Western League Division Two ===
Pos	Team	Pld	W	D	L	GF	GA	GAv	Pts	
1	Barton Hill (C)	18	15	2	1	45	16	2.813	32	
2	Fishponds	18	11	4	3	33	14	2.357	26	
3	St George Reserves	18	11	3	4	52	22	2.364	25	
4	Eastville Wanderers	18	10	2	6	34	23	1.478	22	
5	Eastville Rovers Reserves	18	8	4	6	43	31	1.387	20	
6	Cumberland	18	7	3	8	47	35	1.343	17	
7	Staple Hill Reserves	18	7	2	9	34	58	0.586	16	
8	Bedminster Reserves	18	6	1	11	35	38	0.921	13	
9	Warmley Reserves	18	4	1	13	23	29	0.793	9	
10	Clifton Reserves	18	0	0	18	10	84	0.119	0	
11	Frenchay (X)	0	0	0	0	0	0	—	0	Record expunged

(C) Champions; (X) Resigned from the league

== Match results ==
=== Western League ===
==== Division One ====
14 September 1895 1	Mangotsfield	0–4	Eastville Rovers	Mangotsfield
		Report		Attendance: "Small"

28 September 1895 2	Eastville Rovers	7–3	Trowbridge Town	Ridgeway
	Gallier (x2); Thompson (x2); Brown (x2); Hockin	Report	Everett (x2); Unknown	Attendance: "Very large" Referee: Mr G. Gay

26 October 1895 3	Bedminster	1–3	Eastville Rovers	Ashton Gate
	Popham 2'	Report	Horsey; Thompson; Leese	Stadium: Greenway Bush Ground; Attendance: "Small"; Referee: Mr G. Gay

9 November 1895 4	Swindon Wanderers	1–2	Eastville Rovers	Swindon
	Potter; H. Howard (substituted off)	Report	Unknown scorer; Leese 90'	Attendance: 500; Referee: Mr Bloor (Bristol St George)

16 November 1895 5	Eastville Rovers	1–2	Gloucester	Ridgeway
	Laurie	Report	Scantlebury; Fielding	Referee: Mr S. Major (Swindon)

23 November 1895 6	Eastville Rovers	3–2	Clifton	Ridgeway
	Leese (x2); Osborne	Report	Stout (x2)

30 November 1895 7	Eastville Rovers	5–0	St Paul's	Ridgeway
	Thompson; Brown (x3); Gallier	Report

7 December 1895 Void (Note: The match against Cardiff was expunged from the league records when they were expelled from the league later in the season)	Cardiff	2–3	Eastville Rovers	Cardiff
	Farthing; Stubbs	Report	Ross (x2); Osborne

14 December 1895 8	Eastville Rovers	2–1	Staple Hill	Ridgeway
	Brown; Leese 55' (substituted off)	Report	Rogers	Attendance: 1000

21 December 1895 9	Eastville Rovers	1–2	Warmley	Ridgeway
	Brown	Report	Wilshire; Unknown scorer	Attendance: 3000; Referee: Mr J. Bloor

28 December 1895 10	Clifton	1–1	Eastville Rovers	Kingswood
	Stout	Report	Unknown scorer 60'	Stadium: Chequers Ground; Referee: Mr J. Bloor

11 January 1896 11	Eastville Rovers	2–1	St George	Ridgeway
	Ross; Brown	Report	Britton	Attendance: 1500; Referee: Mr Williams (Staple Hill)

1 February 1896 12	Gloucester	2–3	Eastville Rovers	Gloucester
	F. Fielding (x2)	Report	Thompson; Osborne; Brown 90'	Stadium: The Avenue Road Ground; Referee: Mr Smith (Swindon)

8 February 1896 13	Eastville Rovers	1–2	Bedminster	Ridgeway
	Gallier (pen.)	Report	Harris; Unknown scorer

15 February 1896 14	St Paul's	0–5	Eastville Rovers	Bower Ashton
		Report	Gallier; Leese; Hone (o.g.); Unknown scorer; Unknown scorer	Attendance: 300

22 February 1896 15	Warmley	2–0	Eastville Rovers	Warmley
	Stone; P. Britton	Report		Attendance: 3000; Referee: Mr F.H. Howard (Swindon)

7 March 1896 16	St George	2–1	Eastville Rovers	St George
	Coyne; G. Harris	Report	Leese	Attendance: "A big crowd"

21 March 1896 17	Staple Hill	0–1	Eastville Rovers	Staple Hill
		Report	Gallier 10'	Stadium: Staple Park; Attendance: 800; Referee: Mr Russell (Swindon)

4 April 1896 18	Trowbridge Town	0–1	Eastville Rovers	Trowbridge
		Report	Brown	Attendance: 1000

19	Eastville Rovers	5–0	Mangotsfield	Ridgeway

25 April 1896 20	Eastville Rovers	9–0	Swindon Wanderers	Ridgeway
	Rogers; Brown (x4); Leese (x3); Horsey	Report		Attendance: > 1000

30 April 1896 Test match (Note: As Eastville Rovers and Staple Hill were tied on points at the end of the season, league rules stated that a playoff must be held to decide which time placed second and which third. The game ended in a draw, leading to them being declared joint runners-up.)	Staple Hill	2–2	Eastville Rovers	St George
18:30 GMT	Britton; Unknown scorer	Report	Unknown scorer; Unknown scorer	Referee: Mr A. Farrant

==== Division Two ====
21 September 1895 1	Bedminster Reserves	3–8	Eastville Rovers Reserves	Bedminster
		Report		Stadium: St John's Lane

12 October 1895 2	Eastville Rovers Reserves	1–2	Barton Hill	Unknown
		Report

9 November 1895 3	Eastville Rovers Reserves	1–1	Fishponds	Ridgeway
		Report

16 November 1895 Void (Note: The reserve game against Cumberland was shortened and therefore did not count in the league standings)	Eastville Rovers Reserves	5–1	Cumberland	Unknown
		Report

14 December 1895 4	Staple Hill Reserves	2–3	Eastville Rovers Reserves	Staple Hill
		Report

21 December 1895 5	Warmley Reserves	5–1	Eastville Rovers Reserves	Warmley
		Report

28 December 1895 6	Eastville Rovers Reserves	10–1	Clifton Reserves	Unknown
		Report

11 January 1896 7	St George Reserves	3–2	Eastville Rovers Reserves	St George
		Report

18 January 1896 8	Eastville Rovers Reserves	3–0	Clifton Reserves	Unknown
		Report

1 February 1896 9	Eastville Rovers Reserves	0–2	Barton Hill	Unknown
		Report

22 February 1896 10	Eastville Rovers Reserves	2–1	Warmley Reserves	Ridgeway
		Report

7 March 1896 12	Eastville Rovers Reserves	2–0	St George Reserves	Ridgeway
		Report		Referee: Mr George Gay

14 March 1896 13	Fishponds	4–0	Eastville Rovers Reserves	Fishponds
		Report		Referee: A. Williams

21 March 1896 14	Eastville Rovers Reserves	3–1	Staple Hill Reserves	Ridgeway
		Report		Referee: F.G. Matthews

28 March 1896 15	Eastville Wanderers	1–1	Eastville Rovers Reserves	Eastville
		Report		Stadium: Eastville Park; Referee: H.J. Batchelor

4 April 1896 16	Eastville Rovers Reserves	1–1	Eastville Wanderers	Ridgeway
		Report		Referee: G. Gay

11 April 1896 17	Eastville Rovers Reserves	1–1	Cumberland	Unknown
		Report		Referee: G. Silman

The results of the away match against Bedminster Reserves and the remaining game against Cumberland are not known.

=== FA Cup ===
5 October 1895 Preliminary round	Eastville Rovers	0–2	Warmley	Ridgeway
		Report	Rooke; Stone	Attendance: "Large"; Referee: Arthur Roston Bourke (London)

The lineups for Eastville Rovers' first ever game in the FA Cup (referred to at the time as the English Cup) is shown below.

Eastville Rovers
Lewis John (GK, C)
R. Horsey	A.N. Oldcrock
Ross	A. Fowler	H. McBain
C. Leese	W.T. Thompson	F. Gallier	G. Brown	A. Laurie
F. Webley	S. Stone	W. Rooke	H. Wilshire	"Nip" Britton
F. Bryant	Phil Britton (C)	L. Wilmot
G. Britton	F. Reeves
W. Demery (GK)
Warmley

GK = Goalkeeper, C = Captain

=== Gloucestershire Senior Challenge Cup ===
Rovers were runners-up in the Gloucestershire Senior Cup this season, losing out to Warmley in the final which was watched by around 6000 spectators – believed to have been a record attendance for the area at the time. They were narrowly beaten by a single goal to nil by the Warmleyites in a re-match of the 1889 final which Rovers had won by the same scoreline.

Their semi-final victory was marred by the death of Bedminster outside-right Herbert Edward "Teddy" Smith. He was involved in a clash of heads with Rovers' fullback Lovett during the first half when both were attempting to head the ball, Smith receiving a heavy blow to the side of his head. Both men continued playing after initially falling to the ground. When the game resumed for the second half Smith was late re-joining his teammates and play went on without him. When he eventually made it back onto the field he was reported as appearing pale and confused and unable to participate in any meaningful way. A few minutes later he was forced to leave the match after vomiting and was taken to his parents' house in Southville where he lost consciousness in the evening and died early the following morning.

25 January 1896 Preliminary round	Eastville Rovers	4–0	Bristol South End	Ridgeway
	Osborne (x2); Brown; Leese	Report		Attendance: 2000; Referee: Mr Magor (Swindon)

29 February 1896 First round	St George	1–1	Eastville Rovers	St George
	Harris 47'	Report	Ross	Attendance: 4000; Referee: Mr N. Whittaker

14 March 1896 First round replay	Eastville Rovers	4–0	St George	Ridgeway
	Osborne (x2); Thompson (x2)	Report		Attendance: 4000; Referee: Mr N. Whittaker

28 March 1896 Semi-final	Bedminster	0–1	Eastville Rovers	Bedminster
	Smith (substituted off)	Report	Brown	Attendance: 4000; Referee: Mr Brodie (Wolverhampton)

6 April 1896 Final	Warmley	1–0	Eastville Rovers	St George
	Bowler	Report		Stadium: St George Athletic Ground; Attendance: 6000; Referee: Mr N. Whittaker

=== Friendlies ===
7 September 1895	Eastville Rovers	3–3	St Paul's	Ridgeway
	Rogers (x2); Gallier	Report	Pook; Stone (o.g.); Unknown	Attendance: 300

21 September 1895	Eastville Rovers	2–1	Warmley	Ridgeway
	Griffiths 10'; Thompson 85'	Report	Bryant	Attendance: 1500; Referee: Mr J. Bloor

12 October 1895	Eastville Rovers	4–0	Radstock	Ridgeway
	Leese; Gallier; Thompson; Brown	Report

19 October 1895	Bristol South End	1–1	Eastville Rovers	Bedminster
	Jones	Report	Gallier	Stadium: St John's Lane; Attendance: 2000

2 November 1895	Eastville Rovers	2–4	Hereford Thistle	Ridgeway
	Leese; Thompson	Report	Sharpe (x2); Crump (x2)	Attendance: Over 2000; Referee: Mr J. R. Riddell

26 December 1895	St George	2–1	Eastville Rovers	St George
	W. Harris; Luther (penalty missed); Unknown scorer	Report	Laurie	Stadium: St George Athletic Ground; Attendance: "A fair sprinkling" Referee: Mr G. Gay

4 January 1896	Eastville Rovers	3–0	Bristol South End	Ridgeway
	Brown 45'; Thompson; Gallier	Report		Attendance: 2000

18 January 1896	Eastville Rovers	2–2	Wycombe Wanderers	Ridgeway
	Thompson (substituted off); Gallier; Osborne	Report	Unknown scorer; Unknown scorer

11 April 1896	Bedminster	2–1	Eastville Rovers	Bedminster
	Marsh; Burland	Report	Gallier	Attendance: "Poor"

20 April 1896	Bristol South End	1–0	Eastville Rovers	Bedminster
	Magyer	Report		Stadium: St John's Lane; Attendance: 2000; Referee: Mr J. Bloor

== Statistics ==
Friendly matches are not included in this section.

Match record
Competition	Home						Away						Total					
Competition	P	W	D	L	F	A	P	W	D	L	F	A	P	W	D	L	F	A
Western League	10	7	0	3	36	13	10	7	1	2	21	9	20	14	1	5	57	22
League playoffs	0	0	0	0	0	0	1	0	1	0	2	2	1	0	1	0	2	2
FA Cup	1	0	0	1	0	2	0	0	0	0	0	0	1	0	0	1	0	2
Gloucestershire Cup	2	2	0	0	8	0	3	1	1	1	2	2	5	3	1	1	10	2
Total	13	9	0	4	44	15	14	8	3	3	25	13	27	17	3	7	69	28

=== Cumulative record ===
The total cumulative record of Eastville Rovers up to the end of the 1895–96 season is shown below. This is calculated by adding the numbers in the section above to the total games played up to the end of the previous season. Friendly matches are not included in this table, and games held at neutral venues are considered to have been played away from home.

Match record
Competition	Home						Away						Total					
Competition	P	W	D	L	F	A	P	W	D	L	F	A	P	W	D	L	F	A
Western League	38	19	7	12	108	69	38	16	3	19	61	72	76	35	10	31	169	141
League playoffs	0	0	0	0	0	0	1	0	1	0	2	2	1	0	1	0	2	2
FA Cup	1	0	0	1	0	2	0	0	0	0	0	0	1	0	0	1	0	2
Gloucestershire Cup	7	2	2	3	16	14	15	9	1	5	24	23	22	11	3	8	40	37
Total	46	21	9	16	124	85	54	25	5	24	87	97	100	46	14	40	211	182
