= 1894–95 Eastville Rovers F.C. season =

Eastville Rovers F.C.
1894–95 season
- Captain: H. McBain
- Ground: Ridgeway Road, Ridgeway, Bristol
- Bristol & District League: 6th of 12
- Gloucestershire Senior Cup: Quarter-final
- Top goalscorer: Bob Horsey (17)
Home colours

The 1894–95 season was the twelfth to be played by the team now known as Bristol Rovers, and their eleventh playing under the name Eastville Rovers. The first team played its third season in the first division of the Bristol & District League (now known as the Western Football League), while the reserves competed in the second division of the same competition for the second time. The season was notable for having the first modern Bristol derby when Bristol South End, who later became Bristol City, hosted Eastville Rovers on 22 September.

== Season review ==
The 1894–95 season began with the announcements that H. McBain would replace F.A. Yates as club captain, and that the team would move to a new ground on the opposite side of Ridgeway Road from their home the previous season in Ridgeway. Following a lacklustre campaign the previous season, where both the first team and the reserves finished just one place off the bottom of their divisions, the 1894–94 campaign was one of consolidation. The first team would eventually end the year in a mid-table position, while the reserves finished in 7th place out of 11.

A large growth in the number of spectators watching their games was noted by the Bristol Mercury in October, with crowds of several hundred regularly watching the first team this season. In previous years their attendances had been as low as a few dozen.

== League tables ==
=== Bristol & District League Division One ===
Pos	Team	Pld	W	D	L	GF	GA	GAv	Pts	
1	Hereford Thistle (L)	22	18	3	1	93	21	4.429	39	Joined the Birmingham & District League
2	St George	22	18	3	1	76	21	3.619	39	
3	Warmley	22	14	2	6	74	30	2.467	30	
4	Staple Hill	22	11	4	7	56	38	1.474	26	
5	Gloucester	22	10	4	8	64	54	1.185	24	
6	Eastville Rovers	22	10	4	8	46	40	1.150	24	
7	Trowbridge Town	22	9	4	9	68	48	1.417	22	
8	Clifton	22	8	2	12	47	55	0.855	18	
9	Bedminster	22	7	0	15	39	73	0.534	14	
10	Swindon Wanderers	22	5	3	14	40	63	0.635	13	
11	Mangotsfield	22	5	2	15	22	68	0.324	12	
12	Clevedon (L)	22	1	1	20	23	136	0.169	3	Withdrew from league

(L) Left league at the end of the season

=== Bristol & District League Division Two ===
Pos	Team	Pld	W	D	L	GF	GA	GAv	Pts	
1	Warmley Reserves	20	17	0	3	75	20	3.750	34	
2	St Paul's (P)	20	16	0	4	79	31	2.548	32	Elected to Division One
3	Willsbridge (L)	20	15	1	4	48	21	2.286	31	Withdrew from league
4	St George Reserves	20	14	1	5	69	33	2.091	29	
5	Barton Hill	20	11	1	8	57	31	1.839	23	
6	Bedminster Reserves	20	8	1	11	36	30	1.200	17	
7	Eastville Rovers Reserves	20	8	0	12	45	45	1.000	16	
8	Clifton Reserves	20	7	0	13	40	68	0.588	14	
9	Mangotsfield Reserves (L)	20	4	2	14	30	84	0.357	10	Withdrew from league
10	Staple Hill Reserves	20	4	1	15	32	79	0.405	9	
11	Waverley (L)	20	2	1	17	15	74	0.203	5	Withdrew from league

(L) Left league at the end of the season; (P) Promoted

== Match results ==
=== Bristol & District League ===
==== Division One ====
15 September 1894	Hereford Thistle	4–2	Eastville Rovers	Hereford
	B. Sharp 1'; J. Sharp	Report	John	Stadium: Barrack Ground

29 September 1894	Swindon Wanderers	1–2	Eastville Rovers	Swindon
	Unknown	Report	Thompson; Furse	Referee: Mr Millard (Trowbridge)

6 October 1894	Eastville Rovers	2–2	Staple Hill	Ridgeway
	Rogers; Attewell (substituted off); Horsey	Report	Bracey; Unknown	Attendance: 800

13 October 1894	Eastville Rovers	7–2	Clevedon	Ridgeway
	McBain; Rogers; Horsey; Laurie	Report	Mertons; Wilgreen	Attendance: "Good"

20 October 1894	Gloucester	1–2	Eastville Rovers	Gloucester
	Sherwood	Report	Unknown; Thompson	Stadium: Budding's Field; Referee: Mr J.A. Stevens (league secretary)

27 October 1894	Eastville Rovers	3–0	Mangotsfield	Ridgeway
	Horsey	Report

3 November 1894	Trowbridge Town	2–2	Eastville Rovers	Trowbridge
	Jeynes (penalty missed); Grist	Report	Thompson; Unknown	Referee: Mr Bloor (St George)

17 November 1894	Eastville Rovers	0–4	Hereford Thistle	Ridgeway
	Laurie (penalty missed)	Report	Jack Sharp; Homer	Attendance: 2000

1 December 1894	Eastville Rovers	0–1 (Note: Eastville Rovers lodged an official protest over the result of their home game against St George. The complaint centered around a goal scored by the Rovers that was disallowed by the referee.)	St George	Ridgeway
		Report	Lane	Attendance: >1000; Referee: Mr Stacey (Street)

8 December 1894	Eastville Rovers	2–3 (Note: Rovers started their home game against Clifton with only nine men due to Hodgson and Attewill failing to turn up. Replacement players were found and they joined in later in the match.)	Clifton	Ridgeway
	Porter; Horsey	Report	Britton 5'; Taylor	Referee: Mr J. Bloor

15 December 1894	Eastville Rovers	4–2	Bedminster	Ridgeway
	Rogers; Porter	Report	Skeates (substituted off) 10'; Smith 20'	Attendance: 500; Referee: Mr Millard (Trowbridge)

22 December 1894	Mangotsfield	1–0	Eastville Rovers	Mangotsfield
	Unknown	Report

29 December 1894	Eastville Rovers	3–3	Trowbridge Town	Ridgeway
	Thompson 50'; Hodgkins (substituted off); Porter; Booker 87' (o.g.)	Report	Adams; Readings (pen.); Quinlan 44'	Attendance: 300; Referee: Mr J. Bloor

5 January 1895	Clevedon	1–2	Eastville Rovers	Clevedon
	Wilgreat	Report	Horsey 1'; Laurie

9 March 1895	Clifton	0–1	Eastville Rovers	Kingswood
		Report	Thompson	Stadium: Chequers Ground; Referee: Mr F.T. Logan

16 March 1895	Eastville Rovers	3–5	Gloucester	Ridgeway
	Horsey; Unknown; Unknown	Report	F. Fielding; Wade-Smith; P. Stout; Sherwood	Referee: Mr J.A. Stevens (league secretary)

23 March 1895	St George	0–2	Eastville Rovers	St George
		Report	Rogers; Horsey	Referee: Mr H.E. Roslyn

1 April 1895	Warmley	1–0	Eastville Rovers	Warmley
17:00 GMT	"Nip" Britton	Report		Attendance: 800; Referee: Mr F.M. Millard

6 April 1895	Eastville Rovers	4–2	Swindon Wanderers	Ridgeway
	Unknown 10'; McBain; Horsey; Rogers 80'	Report	Unknown 55'; Unknown	Referee: Mr G. Gay

13 April 1895	Eastville Rovers	0–0 (Note: Eastville Rovers were reduced to ten men with 25 minutes left to play of their home match against Warmley due to Horsey being kicked in the eye.)	Warmley	Ridgeway
	Horsey (substituted off) 65'	Report		Attendance: "Large"; Referee: Mr J. Bloor

15 April 1895	Staple Hill	4–1	Eastville Rovers	Staple Hill
12:00 GMT	Drury 15'; Millard; Thompson (o.g.)	Report	Thompson	Attendance: "fairly large" Referee: Mr G. Gay

20 April 1895	Bedminster	1–4	Eastville Rovers	Bedminster
	Popham	Report	Horsey; Thompson; Brown	Stadium: Coronation Road ground Attendance: "small"

==== Division Two ====
20 October 1895	Eastville Rovers Reserves	1–2	Bedminster Reserves	Unknown
		Report

24 November 1894	Warmley Reserves	3–1	Eastville Rovers Reserves	Warmley
		Report

26 January 1895	Willsbridge	4–2	Eastville Rovers Reserves	Willsbridge
		Report

1 December 1894	Eastville Rovers Reserves	5–3 (Note: Only 75 minutes played of the reserve game were played against St George, therefore the result did not stand.)	St George Reserves	Unknown
		Report

8 December 1894	Eastville Rovers Reserves	5–2	Clifton Reserves	Unknown
		Report

22 December 1894	Eastville Rovers Reserves	5–0	Mangotsfield Reserves	Unknown
		Report

5 January 1895	Eastville Rovers Reserves	2–4	Barton Hill	Unknown
		Report

19 January 1895	Eastville Rovers Reserves	1–2	Warmley Reserves	Unknown
		Report

9 March 1895	Eastville Rovers Reserves	2–0	Willsbridge	Ridgeway
		Report

23 March 1895	Eastville Rovers Reserves	1–2	St George Reserves	Unknown
		Report

6 April 1895	Eastville Rovers Reserves	4–0	Warmley Reserves	Unknown
		Report

13 April 1895	Eastville Rovers Reserves	2–4	St Paul's	Ridgeway
		Report

Note: Three results were given against Warmley Reserves in the press over the course of the season. It's possible that one of these was a friendly match, or that the result of one of these ties was overturned and the game re-played.

=== Gloucestershire Senior Challenge Cup ===
After receiving a bye in the first round thanks to them reaching the final the previous season, Eastville Rovers were eliminated from the cup at the quarter-final stage. They were drawn to play Mangotsfield at home in a game that was played in a snowstorm and Mangotsfield prevailed 5–3. This was in spite of the fact Mangotsfield were reduced to ten men during the first half when their captain, Brain, suffered a broken collarbone.

26 January 1895 Quarter-final	Eastville Rovers	3–5	Mangotsfield	Ridgeway
	M. Thompson; McBain 65' (pen.); Lovett 90'	Report	Britton; Brain (substituted off); Unknown; Davis 83'	Stadium: Ridgeway Road; Referee: Mr Gay

=== Friendlies ===
==== First team ====
8 September 1894	Warmley	0–4	Eastville Rovers	Warmley
15:45 GMT		Report	McBain; Unknown (o.g.); Horsey; Unknown	Attendance: 600; Referee: W.A. Deakin (Bedminster)

22 September 1894	Bristol South End	2–1	Eastville Rovers	Bedminster
	Mayger; Clements 35'	Report	Horsey	Stadium: St John's Lane

2 March 1895	Bristol South End	2–5	Eastville Rovers	Bedminster
	Lewis	Report	Horsey 1'; Thompson; Brown	Stadium: St John's Lane; Referee: George Gay (Warmley)

29 March 1895	Eastville Rovers	1–2	Clifton	Ridgeway
	Horsey	Report	W. Taylor; C. Taylor

27 April 1895	Bristol South End	2–3	Eastville Rovers	Bedminster
	Davis	Report	W. Thompson; Horsey; Osborne	Stadium: St John's Lane; Attendance: 1000; Referee: George Gay (Warmley)

== Statistics ==
Friendly matches are not included in this section.

Match record
Competition	Home						Away						Total					
Competition	P	W	D	L	F	A	P	W	D	L	F	A	P	W	D	L	F	A
Bristol & District League	11	4	3	4	28	24	11	6	1	4	18	16	22	10	4	8	46	40
Gloucestershire Cup	1	0	0	1	3	5	0	0	0	0	0	0	1	0	0	1	3	5
Total	12	4	3	5	31	29	11	6	1	4	18	16	23	10	4	9	49	45

=== Cumulative record ===
The total cumulative record of Eastville Rovers up to the end of the 1894–95 season is shown below. This is calculated by adding the numbers in the section above to the total games played up to the end of the previous season. Friendly matches are not included in this table, and games held at neutral venues are considered to have been played away from home.

Match record
Competition	Home						Away						Total					
Competition	P	W	D	L	F	A	P	W	D	L	F	A	P	W	D	L	F	A
Bristol & District League	28	12	7	9	72	56	28	9	2	17	40	63	56	21	9	26	112	119
Gloucestershire Cup	5	0	2	3	8	14	12	8	0	4	22	21	17	8	2	7	30	35
Total	33	12	9	12	80	70	40	17	2	21	62	84	73	29	11	33	142	154
