= 1893–94 Eastville Rovers F.C. season =

Eastville Rovers F.C.
1893–94 season
- Captain: F.A. Yates
- Ground: Ridgeway Road, Ridgeway, Bristol
- Bristol & District League: 9th of 10
- Gloucestershire Senior Cup: Runners-up
- Gloucestershire Junior Cup: Third round
- Top goalscorer: Bob Horsey (8)
Home colours

The 1893–94 season was the eleventh to be played by the team now known as Bristol Rovers, and their tenth playing under the name Eastville Rovers. The first team continued to play in the first division of the Bristol & District League (now known as the Western Football League), while the reserves became founding members of the second division of the same competition.

== Season review ==
Eastville Rovers began the season in confident mood. They had moved to a new ground in Ridgeway (sometimes referred to in contemporary reports as Rudgeway) on a site shared with Bristol North Cricket Club, which they had felt would improve attendances due to it being closer to Eastville than their former home in Ashley Down. They also welcomed many new players into the club thanks to a merger with St Gabriel's Association Football Club, enabling the formation of a third team to play alongside the firsts and reserves. It would prove to be a bitter-sweet campaign however as although the first team managed to reach the final of the Gloucestershire Cup, both the firsts and reserves finished just one place above the bottom of their respective league tables.

== League tables ==
=== Bristol & District League Division One ===
Pos	Team	Pld	W	D	L	GF	GA	GAv	Pts
1	Warmley (Note: Warmley were deducted two points for fielding a professional player)	18	12	5	1	32	13	2.462	27
2	St George	18	10	6	2	39	23	1.696	26
3	Trowbridge Town	18	9	4	5	54	33	1.636	22
4	Bedminster	18	9	2	7	41	36	1.139	20
5	Clevedon	18	7	5	6	34	40	0.850	19
6	Clifton	18	6	4	8	37	30	1.233	16
7	Staple Hill	18	5	5	8	23	33	0.697	15
8	Gloucester	18	6	1	11	32	45	0.711	13
9	Eastville Rovers	18	5	2	11	30	39	0.769	12
10	Mangotsfield	18	2	4	12	19	48	0.396	8

=== Bristol & District League Division Two ===
Pos	Team	Pld	W	D	L	GF	GA	GAv	Pts
1	Warmley reserves	18	16	1	1	66	12	5.500	33
2	St George reserves	18	15	0	3	50	22	2.273	30
3	Trowbridge Town reserves	18	11	1	6	47	22	2.136	23
4	St Paul's	18	9	3	6	44	51	0.863	21
5	Barton Hill	18	7	4	7	40	32	1.250	18
6	Bedminster reserves	18	6	3	9	35	42	0.833	15
7	Mangotsfield reserves	18	6	1	11	26	41	0.634	13
8	Clifton reserves	18	5	2	11	29	59	0.492	12
9	Eastville Rovers reserves	18	4	2	12	23	45	0.511	10
10	Waverley	18	2	4	12	22	53	0.415	8

== Match results ==
=== Bristol & District League ===
==== Division One ====
7 October 1893	Bedminster	2–0	Eastville Rovers	Ashton Gate
	Mayger; Unknown (o.g.)	Report		Stadium: Ashton Gate Stadium

14 October 1893	Eastville Rovers	5–2	Gloucester	Ridgeway
	Laurie	Report		Attendance: 250

21 October 1893	Warmley	1–0	Eastville Rovers	Warmley
	Silman	Report		Attendance: 700; Referee: J. Bloor

4 November 1893	Mangotsfield	0–3	Eastville Rovers	Mangotsfield
		Report	Laurie; Thompson; Rogers

11 November 1893	Gloucester	3–0	Eastville Rovers	Gloucester
	Sherwood; Robins; Stout	Report		Stadium: Kingsholm; Attendance: 650; Referee: J. Bloor

25 November 1893	Eastville Rovers	4–2	Trowbridge Town	Ridgeway
	Taylor; Horsey; Rogers	Report	Grist; Billett	Referee: W.H. Brain

2 December 1893	Staple Hill	3–1	Eastville Rovers	Staple Hill
	H. Millard; Wiltshire	Report	Horsey

26 December 1893	Eastville Rovers	0–2	St George	Ridgeway
14:40 GMT		Report	Bennett; Patterson	Attendance: 1,000; Referee: Mr J. A. Stevens

30 December 1893	Eastville Rovers	1–3 (Note: Due to a mix-up regarding the kickoff time, Rovers started their home fixture against Clifton with six players. The game was played in thick fog, severely limiting visibility, and Eastville lodged an official protest after the match.)	Clifton	Ridgeway
	Rogers	Report	Wreford-Brown; Unknown

13 January 1894	St George	2–1	Eastville Rovers	St George
14:50 GMT	Winstone	Report

10 February 1894	Trowbridge Town	3–1	Eastville Rovers	Trowbridge
	Wright; Guest	Report	Horsey

3 March 1894	Eastville Rovers	3–3	Bedminster	Ridgeway
	Rogers; Horsey; Laurie	Report	Griffiths; Mayger; Unknown	Referee: J.A. Stevens

10 March 1894	Eastville Rovers	1–2	Clevedon	Ridgeway
	Johns	Report	Mertens	Referee: Mr J.A. Stevens

17 March 1894	Eastville Rovers	3–1	Staple Hill	Ridgeway
	Laurie; McBain; Attwell	Report	H. Nicholls	Referee: Mr J. Bloor

23 March 1894	Eastville Rovers	5–2	Mangotsfield	Rudgeway
Morning		Report

24 March 1894	Eastville Rovers	1–1	Warmley	Rudgeway
	G. Britton (o.g.)	Report	Silman	Referee: Mr F. Millard

7 April 1894	Clevedon	3–1	Eastville Rovers	Clevedon
	P. Hammond; Vernon; Mortens	Report	Rogers	Stadium: Dial Hill; Referee: S. Peacock

14 April 1894	Clifton	4–0	Eastville Rovers	Kingswood
	Newman; A. Symes; E. Symes; Francis	Report		Stadium: Chequers Ground; Attendance: Very small Referee: G. Gay

==== Division Two ====
7 October 1893	Eastville Rovers Reserves	2–6	Bedminster Reserves	Ridgeway
		Report

28 October 1893	Eastville Rovers Reserves	4–1	St Paul's	Ridgeway
	Williams	Report	Hone (pen.)

4 November 1893	Eastville Rovers Reserves	1–3	Mangotsfield Reserves	Eastville
		Report

25 November 1893	Trowbridge Town Reserves	A–A (Note: The reserves' match against Trowbridge on 25 November was abandoned due to poor light. Eastville had arrived late, and were leading 2–0 when darkness fell.)	Eastville Rovers Reserves	Trowbridge
		Report

2 December 1893	Eastville Rovers Reserves	0–4	Barton Hill	Eastville
		Report

9 December 1893	Waverley (Note: Waverley started the game with nine men.)	4–1	Eastville Rovers Reserves	Knowle
		Report

26 December 1893	Trowbridge Town Reserves	0–3	Eastville Rovers Reserves	Trowbridge
		Report

27 January 1894	Barton Hill	0–1	Eastville Rovers Reserves	Barton Hill
		Report

10 February 1894	Eastville Rovers Reserves	1–2	Trowbridge Town Reserves	Ridgeway
		Report

24 February 1894	St Paul's	4–3	Eastville Rovers Reserves	Long Ashton
		Report

3 March 1894	Bedminster Reserves	2–0	Eastville Rovers Reserves	Bedminster
	F. Harris; G. Hemmins	Report		Attendance: 300

10 March 1894	Eastville Rovers Reserves	0–2	St Paul's	Ridgeway
		Report

17 March 1894	St George Reserves	3–1	Eastville Rovers Reserves	St George
		Report

21 April 1894	Warmley Reserves	7–1	Eastville Rovers Reserves	Warmley
		Report

25 April 1894	Eastville Rovers Reserves (Note: Rovers' reserves only fielded nine men in their 2–1 defeat to Clifton)	1–2	Clifton Reserves	Kingswood
17:30				Stadium: Chequers Ground; Referee: G. Gay

28 April 1894	Clifton Reserves	2–2	Eastville Rovers Reserves	Kingswood
15:30				Stadium: Chequers Ground; Referee: G. Gay

30 April 1894	Eastville Rovers Reserves	3–1	Waverley	Kingswood
18:00				Stadium: Chequers Ground; Referee: E. H. Nettle

The date and result of the away game against Mangotsfield reserves is not known. The final three games were played over the Easter week of 1894 and all took place at the Chequers ground in Kingswood.

=== Gloucestershire Senior Challenge Cup ===
Eastville Rovers were drawn away to Mangotsfield in the first round.

27 January 1894 First round	Mangotsfield	0–1	Eastville Rovers	Mangotsfield
		Report	Taylor	Referee: J. Bloor

24 February 1894 Semi-final	Gloucester	0–1	Eastville Rovers	Gloucester
			Horsey

31 March 1894 Final	St George	3–1	Eastville Rovers	Kingswood
	W. Britton; D.S. Gerrish	Report	R. Horsey	Stadium: Chequers Ground; Attendance: 4,000

=== Gloucestershire Junior Challenge Cup ===
11 November 1893 Third round	Eastville Rovers Reserves	2–4	Bedminster Reserves
		Report

=== Friendlies ===
==== First team ====
16 September 1893	Trowbridge Town	4–4	Eastville Rovers	Trowbridge
	Hill; Quinian; Everett	Report	Rogers; Thompson	Referee: Mr F. M. Millard

23 September 1893	Warmley	5–1	Eastville Rovers	Warmley
	Mackay; Silman; Peacock	Report	Unknown

9 December 1893	Eastville Rovers	4–0	St George	Ridgeway
15:00 GMT	Horsey; Taylor; Laurie	Report

16 December 1893	Swindon Athletic	2–1	Eastville Rovers	Swindon
	Rennie; Hayward	Report		Stadium: Wiltshire County Ground; Referee: Mr S. J. Strange

23 December 1893	Eastville Rovers	1–0	Swindon Wanderers	Ridgeway
	Rogers	Report

20 January 1894	Eastville Rovers	2–4 (Note: Both Eastville and Warmley requested that their league game on 20 January be postponed due to partial flooding of the pitch and strong winds, but it went ahead as planned. The league committee later agreed that the result should not stand as a league match and a replay was ordered for 24 March.)	Warmley	Ridgeway
	Horsey; G. Britton (o.g.)	Report	"Nipper" Britton; Nelmes; Peacock; King	Attendance: 800; Referee: Mr. Millard

24 February 1894	Gloucester	0–1	Eastville Rovers	Gloucester
		Report		Referee: Mr A. Francis

==== Reserves ====
30 September 1893	Craigmore College	0–4	Eastville Rovers Reserves	Clifton
		Report

3 February 1894	Eastville Rovers Reserves	5–1 (Note: The game between Eastville Rovers Reserves and Waverley was originally scheduled as a league match, but due to the poor state of the pitch the result didn't count towards the league table and the match was ordered to be replayed.)	Waverley	Ridgeway
		Report

==== Third team ====
The name of the club's third team was given variously as Eastville Rovers Extras, Eastville Rovers A, or simply Eastville Rovers. The name of the team as it was reported in the local press for each match is shown in the table below.

2 September 1893	St. Simon's	6–1	Eastville Rovers Extras	Eastville
		Report		Stadium: Eastville Park

21 October 1893	Eastville Rovers A	2–2	Brislington Reserves	Ridgeway
		Report

28 October 1893	St. Michael's	1–1	Eastville Rovers	Eastville
		Report		Stadium: Eastville Park

9 December 1893	Eastville Rovers Extras	0–1	Adlam's Rovers	Eastville
		Report		Stadium: Eastville Park

16 December 1893	Eastville Rovers	2–4	Eastville Wanderers	Ridgeway
		Report

20 January 1894	Redfield Excelsior	1–2	Eastville Rovers Extras	The Downs
		Report

3 February 1894	St. Simon's	5–1	Eastville Rovers A	Eastville
		Report		Stadium: Eastville Park

26 February 1894	St Michael & All Angels	1–0	Eastville Rovers A	Eastville
		Report		Stadium: Eastville Park

== Statistics ==
Friendly matches are not included in this section.

Match record
Competition	Home						Away						Total					
Competition	P	W	D	L	F	A	P	W	D	L	F	A	P	W	D	L	F	A
Bristol & District League	9	4	2	3	23	18	9	1	0	8	7	21	18	5	2	11	30	39
Gloucestershire Cup	0	0	0	0	0	0	3	2	0	1	3	3	3	2	0	1	3	3
Total	9	4	2	3	23	18	12	3	0	9	10	24	21	7	2	12	33	42

=== Cumulative record ===
The total cumulative record of Eastville Rovers up to the end of the 1893–94 season is shown below. This is calculated by adding the numbers in the section above to the total games played up to the end of the previous season. Friendly matches are not included in this table, and games held at neutral venues are considered to have been played away from home.

Match record
Competition	Home						Away						Total					
Competition	P	W	D	L	F	A	P	W	D	L	F	A	P	W	D	L	F	A
Bristol & District League	17	8	4	5	44	32	17	3	1	13	22	47	34	11	5	18	66	79
Gloucestershire Cup	4	0	2	2	5	9	12	8	0	4	22	21	16	8	2	6	27	30
Total	21	8	6	7	49	41	29	11	1	17	44	68	50	19	7	24	93	109

== Bibliography ==
- Byrne, Stephen; Jay, Mike (2003). Bristol Rovers Football Club: The Definitive History 1883–2003. Stroud: Tempus. ISBN 0-7524-2717-2.
