= 1892–93 Eastville Rovers F.C. season =

Eastville Rovers F.C.
1892–93 season
- Ground: Three Acres, Ashley Down, Bristol
- Bristol & District League: 6th
- Gloucestershire Senior Cup: 1st round
- Top goalscorer: Bill Rogers (9)
Home colours

The 1892–93 season was the tenth to be played by the team now known as Bristol Rovers, and their ninth playing under the name Eastville Rovers. It was significant in that it was their first year competing in an organised league, when they became founder members of the Bristol & District League (now known as the Western League).

== Season review ==
Rovers finished in sixth place in the league. They had to a slow start to their campaign, but finished strongly, winning their last four games. There was some confusion surrounding the game against St George on 22 October, which although originally arranged as a league match it was played as a friendly as no referee had been appointed.

Though the match between Eastville Rovers and St. George on Saturday was a league fixture, it now appears it was altered by consent of both sides to a "friendly" game. Through some misunderstanding a referee was not appointed and the captains arranged that the game should be played on another day.

— Bristol Mercury, 25 October 1892

== League table ==
Pos	Team	Pld	W	D	L	GF	GA	GR	Pts
1	Warmley	16	11	3	2	72	19	3.789	25
2	Trowbridge Town	16	10	4	2	66	17	3.882	24
3	St George	16	9	5	2	36	22	1.636	23
4	Bedminster	16	6	5	5	30	34	0.882	17
5	Clevedon	16	6	4	6	25	36	0.694	16
6	Eastville Rovers	16	6	3	7	36	40	0.900	15
7	Clifton	16	4	2	10	27	61	0.443	10
8	Mangotsfield	16	3	2	11	19	45	0.422	8
9	Wells City	16	1	4	11	14	51	0.275	6

== Match results ==
=== Bristol & District League ===
1 October 1892	Eastville Rovers	1–3	Mangotsfield	Mangotsfield^{[α]}
15:40 GMT	Perrin	Report (via BNA, subscription required)

8 October 1892	Trowbridge Town	6–2	Eastville Rovers	Trowbridge
	Laurie; F. Everett; Hurn; G. Everett	Report (via BNA, subscription required)	Rogers	Attendance: 200; Referee: F. Crossley (Swindon)

12 November 1892	Eastville Rovers	2–2^{[β]}	Warmley	Ashley Down
	Thompson; Summerill (o.g.)	Report (via BNA, subscription required)	King; Mackay	Referee: J. Bloor

19 November 1892	Wells City	2–2	Eastville Rovers	Wells
	Coleman; McMahon	Report (via BNA, subscription required)	Lovett; Yates	Referee: Sturgess Jones

26 November 1892	Eastville Rovers	1–2	Clevedon	Ashley Down
	Taylor	Report (via BNA, subscription required)	Grey; Mertens	Referee: J. Bloor

3 December 1892	Bedminster	5–0	Eastville Rovers	Ashton Gate
	McCarthy; Macfarlane; Marshall; Griffiths; Unknown	Report (via BNA, subscription required)		Stadium: Ashton Gate Stadium; Attendance: 1,000; Referee: J.R. Riddell

24 December 1892	Eastville Rovers	3–1	Clifton	Ashley Down
	Laurie; Rogers; Unknown (o.g.)	Report (via BNA, subscription required)	Francis	Referee: S. Peacock

26 December 1892	St George	3–1	Eastville Rovers	St George
		Report (via BNA, subscription required)

21 January 1893	Eastville Rovers	2–2	Trowbridge Town	Ashley Down
	Unknown; Johns	Report (via BNA, subscription required)	Hurn; Wakeley	Referee: J.R. Riddell

11 February 1893	Eastville Rovers	2–1	St George	Ashley Down
	Bill Rogers; Beverley	Report (via BNA, subscription required)	Unknown	Referee: F. Gyles

18 February 1893	Warmley	8–2	Eastville Rovers	Warmley
		Report (via BNA, subscription required)	Taylor; A. Laurie

4 March 1893	Clevedon	1–0	Eastville Rovers	Clevedon
	Unknown	Report (via BNA, subscription required)

11 March 1893	Eastville Rovers	5–1^{[γ]}	Wells City	Ashley Down
	Horsey; Rogers; A. Laurie	Report (via BNA, subscription required)	Colman

18 March 1893	Clifton	1–3	Eastville Rovers	Kingswood
15:35 GMT	Unknown	Report (via BNA, subscription required)	Thompson; Johns	Stadium: Chequers Ground; Referee: C. Gyles

25 March 1893	Eastville Rovers	5–2	Bedminster	Ashley Down
	Rogers; W. Thompson; Johns; Laurie	Report (via BNA, subscription required)	Griffiths; Milne (red card)	Referee: J. Bloor

31 March 1893	Mangotsfield	0–5	Eastville Rovers	Mangotsfield
	Nolan (red card); Punter (red card)	Report (via BNA, subscription required)	Attwell; Horsey; A. Laurie	Referee: E.B. Nettle

^[α] Eastville Rovers were nominally the home team, but the match was played at Mangotsfield
^[β] Game stopped after 78 minutes due to poor light
^[γ] Wells only fielded ten players

=== Gloucestershire Senior Challenge Cup ===
28 January 1893 First round	Eastville Rovers	2–2	Mangotsfield	Ashley Down
	Rogers; Unknown	Report (via BNA, subscription required)	Punter; Johns (o.g.)	Referee: G. Gay

13 February 1893 First round replay	Mangotsfield	2–1	Eastville Rovers	Mangotsfield
	Unknown	Report (via BNA, subscription required)	Unknown	Referee: Mr Deakin

=== Gloucestershire Junior Challenge Cup ===
First round	Fillwood	–	Eastville Rovers Reserves	Filwood

=== Friendlies ===
==== First team ====
10 September 1892	Warmley	2–3	Eastville Rovers	Warmley
		Report (via BNA, subscription required)

17 September 1892	St George	4–1	Eastville Rovers	St George
15:40 GMT	Brown; Unknown; Unknown; Unknown	Report (via BNA, subscription required)	Unknown	Referee: G. Bloor

22 October 1892^{[δ]}	St George	2–0	Eastville Rovers	St George
15:10 GMT	Gerrish; Britton	Report (via BNA, subscription required)		Referee: A. Greenough

4 February 1893	Bedminster	0–0	Eastville Rovers	Ashton Gate
		Report (via BNA, subscription required)		Stadium: Ashton Gate Stadium; Attendance: 600

15 April 1893^{[ε]}	Swindon Athletic	0–1	Eastville Rovers	Swindon
		Report (via BNA, subscription required)		Stadium: The Croft; Referee: Frank Crossley

^[δ] The game against St George on 22 October was originally scheduled to be a league match, but was played as a friendly when it was discovered that no referee had been appointed.
^[ε] Swindon Athletic began the game with eight players, but were brought up to full strength when three substitutes were found.

==== Reserves ====
1 October 1892	Mangotsfield Reserves	2–0	Eastville Rovers Reserves	Mangotsfield
		Report (via BNA, subscription required)

22 October 1892	Eastville Rovers Reserves	0–4	St George Reserves	Ashley Down
		Report (via BNA, subscription required)

4 February 1893	Eastville Rovers Reserves	0–3	Bedminster Reserves	Ashley Down
		Report (via BNA, subscription required)

== Statistics ==
Friendly matches are not included in this section.

Match record
Competition	Home						Away						Total					
Competition	P	W	D	L	F	A	P	W	D	L	F	A	P	W	D	L	F	A
Bristol & District League	8	4	2	2	21	14	8	2	1	5	15	26	16	6	3	7	36	40
Gloucestershire Cup	1	0	1	0	2	2	1	0	0	1	1	2	2	0	1	1	3	4
Total	9	4	3	2	23	16	9	2	1	6	16	28	18	6	4	8	39	44

Goalscorers
Player	Goals		
Player	League	Cup	Total
Bill Rogers	8	1	9
Laurie	5	0	5
Johns	4	0	4
Attwell	3	0	3
Bob Horsey	3	0	3
Thompson	3	0	3
Taylor	2	0	2
Beverley	1	0	1
Lovett	1	0	1
Walter Perrin	1	0	1
Yates	1	0	1
Unknown	1	1	2
Opposition own goal	2	0	2

=== Cumulative record ===
The total cumulative record of Eastville Rovers up to the end of the 1892–93 season is shown below. This is calculated by adding the numbers in the section above to the total games played up to the end of the previous season. Friendly matches are not included in this table, and games held at neutral venues are considered to have been played away from home.

Match record
Competition	Home						Away						Total					
Competition	P	W	D	L	F	A	P	W	D	L	F	A	P	W	D	L	F	A
Bristol & District League	8	4	2	2	21	14	8	2	1	5	15	26	16	6	3	7	36	40
Gloucestershire Cup	4	0	2	2	5	9	9	6	0	3	19	18	13	6	2	5	24	27
Total	12	4	4	4	26	23	17	8	1	8	34	44	29	12	5	12	60	67

== Bibliography ==
- Byrne, Stephen; Jay, Mike (2003). Bristol Rovers Football Club: The Definitive History 1883–2003. Stroud: Tempus. ISBN 0-7524-2717-2.
- Robinson, Michael, ed. (2006). Non-League Football Tables 1889–2006. Cleethorpes: Soccer Books. ISBN 978-1862231443.
