= 1891–92 Eastville Rovers F.C. season =

Eastville Rovers
1891–92 season
- Ground: Schoolmasters' Cricket Ground, Ashley Down, Bristol
- Gloucestershire Senior Challenge Cup: 1st round

The 1891–92 season was the ninth to be played by the team that are now known as Bristol Rovers, and their eighth playing under the name Eastville Rovers.

== Season review ==
This was the last season that the club would spend playing mainly friendly matches, as they would become founder members of the newly-formed Bristol & District Football League (now known as the Western League) in the summer of 1892. The opposition consisted mainly of teams that would also join the league next season, along with Kingswood, Craigmore College, and a Swindon Town "A" team. The club's participation in the Gloucestershire Senior Cup saw them reach the semi-final stage: A first-round victory over Craigmore College was followed by defeat by Warmley, both games ending with a 7–1 scoreline.

After a year's hiatus the reserve team returned to action, entering the Gloucestershire Junior Cup. After receiving a first-round bye, they beat St Paul's 4–0 before suffering a heavy 8–1 defeat to St George Reserves in the third round.

== Results ==
=== First team ===
==== Gloucestershire Senior Cup ====
Round	Date	Opponent	Venue	Result	Scorers	Notes
1	30 January 1892	Craigmore College	The Downs, Bristol	Won 7–1	Laurie (2), Thomas (2), Taylor, Purser, Yates	
Semi-final	27 February 1892	Warmley	Warmley, Gloucestershire	Lost 1–7	Yates	

==== Club matches ====
Date	Opponent	Venue	Result	Scorers	Notes
26 September 1891	Warmley	Warmley, Gloucestershire	Lost 0–7		
10 October 1891	Mangotsfield	Schoolmasters' Cricket Ground, Bristol	Drew 1–1	Yates	
17 October 1891	Bedminster	Schoolmasters' Cricket Ground, Bristol	Lost 1–2		
24 October 1891	Swindon Town "A"	The Croft, Swindon	Lost 2–5		
31 October 1891	St George	Schoolmasters' Cricket Ground, Bristol	Lost 1–2		
7 November 1891	Craigmore College	Schoolmasters' Cricket Ground, Bristol	Won 10–0		
21 November 1891	Clifton	Schoolmasters' Cricket Ground, Bristol	Won 1–0	Yates	Clifton played most of the game with 10 men
28 November 1891	Kingswood	Chequers Ground, Kingswood	Won 3–1	A. Laurie, Thomas, Yates	Rovers only fielded 9 players
5 December 1891	St George	St George, Bristol	Lost 2–8	Laurie, Luke	
12 December 1891	Swindon Town	Schoolmasters' Cricket Ground, Bristol	Drew 2–2	Yates, Laurie	
19 December 1891	Trowbridge Town	Schoolmasters' Cricket Ground, Bristol	Drew 1–1	Yates	
26 December 1891	St Simon's	Schoolmasters' Cricket Ground, Bristol	Won 3–0		
2 January 1892	Trowbridge Town	Trowbridge, Wiltshire	Lost 2–5	Rogers (2)	
16 January 1892	Warmley	Schoolmasters' Cricket Ground, Bristol	Lost 1–6	Laurie	
23 January 1892	Clifton	Gloucestershire County Ground, Bristol	Won 3–1	Yates (2), Rogers	
6 February 1892	Warmley	Warmley, Gloucestershire	Lost 1–6	Laurie	
13 February 1892	Mangotsfield	Mangotsfield, Gloucestershire	Won 2–1		
5 March 1892	Trowbridge Town	Trowbridge, Wiltshire	Drew 1–1		
12 March 1892	Kingswood	Schoolmasters' Cricket Ground, Bristol			
17 March 1892	Craigmore College	Away	Won 7–1		
29 March 1892	St Simon's	Away	Won 2–0		
9 April 1892	Trowbridge Town	Trowbridge, Wiltshire	Lost 1–5		

=== Reserves ===
==== Gloucestershire Junior Cup ====
Round	Date	Opponent	Venue	Result	Scorers	Notes
1		Bye				
2	28 November 1891	St Paul's	Schoolmasters' Cricket Ground, Bristol	Won 4–0		
3	5 December 1891	St George reserves	St George, Bristol	Lost 2–8		

==== Club matches ====
Date	Opponent	Venue	Result	Scorers	Notes
10 October 1891	Barton Hill	The Downs, Bristol	Lost 0–3		
17 October 1891	Bedminster Reserves	Bedminster, Bristol			
24 October 1891	Warmley Church	Warmley, Gloucestershire	Lost 0–3		
31 October 1891	St John's (Bedminster)	Bedminster, Bristol	Lost 1–5		
19 December 1891	Mangotsfield Reserves	Mangotsfield, Gloucestershire			
26 December 1891	Melville	The Downs, Bristol			
2 January 1892	Barton Hill	Schoolmasters' Cricket Ground, Bristol	Lost 0–7		
9 January 1892	Eastville Wanderers	Schoolmasters' Cricket Ground, Bristol			
23 January 1892	Redcliff	Schoolmasters' Cricket Ground, Bristol	Won 3–2		
13 February 1892	Mangotsfield Reserves	Schoolmasters' Cricket Ground, Bristol	Won 5–1		
20 February 1892	Bedminster Reserves	Schoolmasters' Cricket Ground, Bristol			

== Statistics ==
Friendly matches are not included in this section.

Match record
Competition	Home						Away						Total					
Competition	P	W	D	L	F	A	P	W	D	L	F	A	P	W	D	L	F	A
Gloucestershire Cup	0	0	0	0	0	0	2	1	0	1	8	8	2	1	0	1	8	8

Goalscorers
Player	Goals		
Player	League	Cup	Total
Laurie	–	2	2
Thomas	–	2	2
Yates	–	2	2
Purser	–	1	1
Taylor	–	1	1

=== Cumulative record ===
The total cumulative record of Eastville Rovers up to the end of the 1891–92 season is shown below. This is calculated by adding the numbers in the section above to the total games played up to the end of the last season. Friendly matches are not included in this table, and games held at neutral venues are considered to have been played away from home.

As of the summer of 1891, Rovers' competitive matches had all been played in the Gloucestershire Cup.

Match record
Competition	Home						Away						Total					
Competition	P	W	D	L	F	A	P	W	D	L	F	A	P	W	D	L	F	A
Gloucestershire Cup	3	0	1	2	3	7	8	6	0	2	18	16	11	6	1	4	21	23

== Bibliography ==
- Byrne, Stephen; Jay, Mike (2003). Bristol Rovers Football Club: The Definitive History 1883–2003. Stroud: Tempus. ISBN 0-7524-2717-2.
