= 1889–90 Eastville Rovers F.C. season =

Eastville Rovers
1889–90 season
- Ground: Three Acres
- Gloucestershire Senior Challenge Cup: Second round

The 1889–90 season was the seventh to be played by the team that are now known as Bristol Rovers, and their sixth playing under the name Eastville Rovers.

== Season review ==
As reigning Gloucestershire Cup champions, much was expected of Eastville Rovers during the 1889–90 season, but for much of the early part of the season they were unable to field a full-strength side and as a result they put in a number of lacklustre performances. They failed in their efforts to retain the trophy thanks to a heavy defeat to Clifton in the second round.

Prior to their meeting with Rovers in the first round of the newly renamed Gloucestershire Senior Challenge Cup, two Warmley players were banned for two months for excessively rough play in a match against Clifton. Serious consideration was given to postponing the cup tie because the Warmley team wouldn't have been at full strength, but the game went ahead on 18 January as planned, and was won by Rovers thanks to a single goal by Walter Perrin. Reports at the time commented on a large crowd attending the cup match in the hope of seeing some more violent play.

The reserve team had fewer games than in previous seasons, but this year saw them enter a cup competition for the first time. They took part in the inaugural Gloucestershire Junior Challenge Cup, where they were drawn against Brandon in the first round. A comfortable 6–0 victory put the Rovers through to the second round, where they were beaten by eventual cup winners Kingswood Congregational. It took the Kingswood side four attempts to beat Warmley Reserves in the final – two draws were followed by a game that had to be replayed due to the use of ineligible players, with Kingswood Congregational finally taking the trophy after the third replay.

A curious incident took place just before Christmas when the Bristol Mercury reported that the reserve team had drawn 23–23 with Clifton's reserves on 21 December. The following day the paper printed a retraction of the story, stating that they had been told by the honorary secretary of Clifton that the game had not taken place.

== Results ==
=== First team ===
==== Gloucestershire Senior Cup ====
Round	Date	Opponent	Venue	Result	Scorers	Notes
1	18 January 1890	Warmley	Warmley, Gloucestershire	Won 1–0	Perrin	
Semi-final	15 February 1890	Clifton	Gloucestershire County Ground	Lost 2–6	Taylor, Hodgson	

==== Club matches ====
Date	Opponent	Venue	Result	Scorers	Notes
29 August 1889	Weston-super-Mare	Recreation Grounds, Weston-super-Mare			
21 September 1889	Kingswood	Kingswood, Bristol	Lost 0–2		
12 October 1889	Warmley	Warmley, Gloucestershire	Drew 3–3	Gay (o.g.), Wilmut (o.g.)	
19 October 1889	Craigmore College	The Downs	Drew 1–1		
26 October 1889	Bath	The Downs, Bristol	Won 1–0	Channing	
9 November 1889	Clifton	Ashton Gate, Bristol	Lost 0–1		
16 November 1889	Trowbridge	Trowbridge, Wiltshire	Lost 2–4	Own goal, Yates	
23 November 1889	St George	The Downs, Bristol	Won 2–0		
30 November 1889	St Simon	Bishopston, Bristol	Won 4–1	F. Laurie (3), Hardick	
7 December 1889	Clifton	Gloucestershire County Ground	Lost 0–3		
14 December 1889	Clevedon	Horfield, Bristol	Won 2–0	Perrin, Attewell	
21 December 1889	Warmley	Bristol	Drew 0–0		
28 December 1889	Old Boys, Q.E.H.	Eastville, Bristol	Won 2–1		
11 January 1890	Trowbridge	Bishopston, Bristol	Lost 1–2		
25 January 1890	Bath	Bath, Somerset			
8 February 1890	Kingswood	Kingswood, Bristol	Won 2–1	Perrin (2)	
1 March 1890	St George	St George, Bristol	Lost 1–2		
29 March 1890	Clevedon	Clevedon, Somerset	Lost 1–4		

=== Reserves ===
==== Gloucestershire Junior Cup ====
Round	Date	Opponent	Venue	Result	Scorers	Notes
1	19 October 1889	Brandon	Home	Won 6–0	Rogers (4), Smith, Hooper	
2	9 November 1889	Kingswood Congregational		Lost 0–1		

==== Club matches ====
Date	Opponent	Venue	Result	Scorers	Notes
26 October 1889	Rudgeway	Away	Won 5–0	Rogers (3), Smith, Neale	
2 November 1889	Clifton Reserves	The Downs, Bristol	Lost 0–3		
23 November 1889	Clifton Reserves	The Downs, Bristol	Lost 0–1		
21 December 1889	Clifton Reserves	The Downs, Bristol	Not played		

== Statistics ==
Friendly matches are not included in this section.

Match record
Competition	Home						Away						Total					
Competition	P	W	D	L	F	A	P	W	D	L	F	A	P	W	D	L	F	A
Gloucestershire Cup	0	0	0	0	0	0	2	1	0	1	3	6	2	1	0	1	3	6

Goalscorers
Player	Goals		
Player	League	Cup	Total
Hodgson	–	1	1
Walter Perrin	–	1	1
Taylor	–	1	1

=== Cumulative record ===
The total cumulative record of Eastville Rovers up to the end of the 1889–90 season is shown below. This is calculated by adding the numbers in the section above to the total games played up to last season. Friendly matches are not included in this table, and games held at neutral venues are considered to have been played away from home.

As of the summer of 1889, Rovers' competitive matches had all been played in the Gloucestershire Cup.

Match record
Competition	Home						Away						Total					
Competition	P	W	D	L	F	A	P	W	D	L	F	A	P	W	D	L	F	A
Gloucestershire Cup	2	0	1	1	1	4	6	5	0	1	10	8	8	5	1	2	11	12

== Bibliography ==
- Byrne, Stephen; Jay, Mike (2003). Bristol Rovers Football Club: The Definitive History 1883–2003. Stroud: Tempus. ISBN 0-7524-2717-2.
