= 1890–91 Eastville Rovers F.C. season =

Eastville Rovers
1890–91 season
- Ground: Three Acres, Ashley Down, Bristol
- Gloucestershire Senior Challenge Cup: 1st round

The 1890–91 season was the eighth to be played by the team that are now known as Bristol Rovers, and their seventh playing under the name Eastville Rovers.

== Season review ==
Eastville Rovers' stay in this year's Gloucestershire Senior Challenge Cup was a brief one. Prior to this season they had never failed to reach the semi-final stage, but after gaining automatic entry to the competition based on their performance last season they found themselves eliminated in the first round by Bedminster.

There was a depleted look to the club friendly match list too due to poor weather during the middle part of the season. A severe frost set in across England throughout December and January, which meant that very little football was possible over the winter.

The club stopped fielding a reserve team this season, leaving only a single team representing the club. They had entered a second XI into the inaugural Gloucestershire Junior Challenge Cup last year, but they opted not to put a team into the competition this time around.

== Results ==
=== First team ===
==== Gloucestershire Senior Cup ====
Round	Date	Opponent	Venue	Result	Scorers	Notes
1	31 January 1891	Bedminster	Three Acres, Bristol	Lost 2–3	Perrin, Laurie	

==== Club matches ====
Date	Opponent	Venue	Result	Scorers	Notes
20 September 1890	Warmley	Warmley, Gloucestershire	Lost 0–1		
4 October 1890	St George	St George, Bristol	Lost 4–8	Perrin (2), Laurie, Yates	
11 October 1890	Bedminster	Bedminster Cricket Ground, Bristol	Lost 2–4	Perrin (2)	
18 October 1890	Clevedon	Three Acres, Bristol	Won 3–0		
25 October 1890	Trowbridge Town	Trowbridge, Wiltshire	Lost 1–5	Yates	
8 November 1890	Craigmore College	Three Acres, Bristol	Won 5–1	Yates, W. Taylor, A. Laurie, Perrin, Hodgson	
15 November 1890	Clifton	Clifton, Bristol	Won 3–0	Yates (3)	
22 November 1890	Bath	Three Acres, Bristol	Drew 3–3	Yates (2), A. Laurie	
13 December 1890	Bedminster	Ashton Gate, Bristol	Lost 1–4	Yates	
20 December 1890	Warmley	Three Acres, Bristol			
27 December 1890	Clevedon	Clevedon, Somerset			
10 January 1891	St George	Three Acres, Bristol			
24 January 1891	Trowbridge Town	Three Acres, Bristol	Lost 3–1	Somerton	
7 February 1891	St George	St George, Bristol			
14 February 1891	Craigmore College	Three Acres, Bristol	Won 8–0	F. Laurie, Wallace, Taylor, Thomas	Rovers only fielded ten players
21 February 1891	Clifton	Three Acres, Bristol	Drew 1–1	Thomas	
14 March 1891	Bath	Lambridge Meadows, Bath	Cancelled		
28 March 1891	Trowbridge Town	Trowbridge, Wiltshire	Lost 1–3	Perrin	
11 April 1891	Warmley	Warmley, Gloucestershire	Lost 1–5	W. Taylor	

== Statistics ==
Friendly matches are not included in this section.

Match record
Competition	Home						Away						Total					
Competition	P	W	D	L	F	A	P	W	D	L	F	A	P	W	D	L	F	A
Gloucestershire Cup	1	0	0	1	2	3	0	0	0	0	0	0	1	0	0	1	2	3

Goalscorers
Player	Goals		
Player	League	Cup	Total
Laurie	–	1	1
Walter Perrin	–	1	1

=== Cumulative record ===
The total cumulative record of Eastville Rovers up to the end of the 1890–91 season is shown below. This is calculated by adding the numbers in the section above to the total games played up to the end of the last season. Friendly matches are not included in this table, and games held at neutral venues are considered to have been played away from home.

As of the summer of 1891, Rovers' competitive matches had all been played in the Gloucestershire Cup.

Match record
Competition	Home						Away						Total					
Competition	P	W	D	L	F	A	P	W	D	L	F	A	P	W	D	L	F	A
Gloucestershire Cup	3	0	1	2	3	7	6	5	0	1	10	8	9	5	1	3	13	15

== Bibliography ==
- Byrne, Stephen; Jay, Mike (2003). Bristol Rovers Football Club: The Definitive History 1883–2003. Stroud: Tempus. ISBN 0-7524-2717-2.
