= 1888–89 Eastville Rovers F.C. season =

Eastville Rovers
1888–89 season
- Captain: Fred Channing
- Gloucestershire Challenge Cup: Winners

The 1888–89 season was the sixth to be played by the team that is now known as Bristol Rovers, and their fifth playing under the name Eastville Rovers. It was significant as being the first season in which the club won a trophy, taking the Gloucestershire Cup title in just the second year of the tournament's existence.

== Season review ==
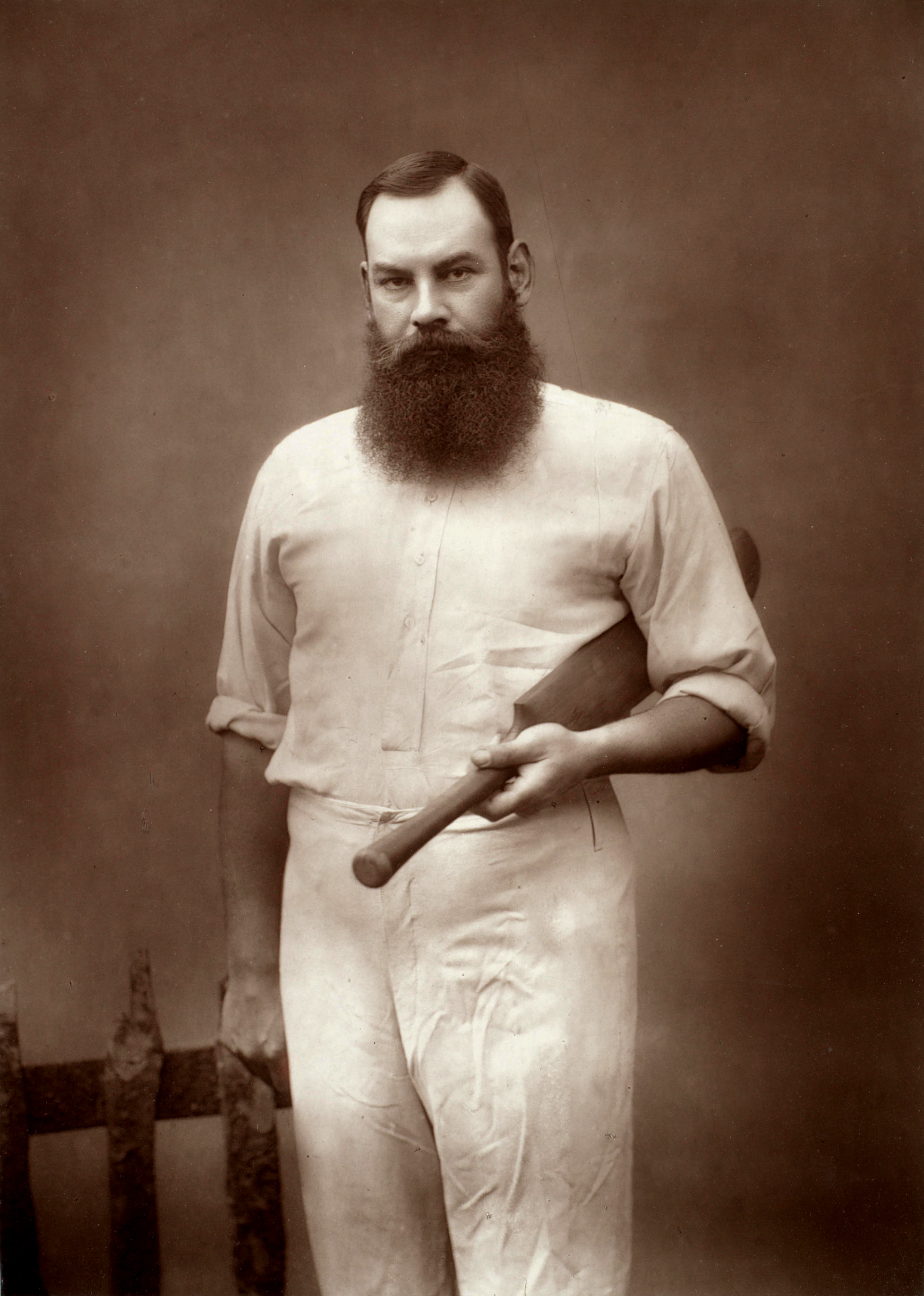
Legendary cricketer W.G. Grace refereed Rovers' match against Wick & Doynton

Before the season began, Fred Channing was re-elected as club captain, with W.J. Somerton continuing in his role of vice captain. S. Burgess and W. Braund were re-elected as second XI captain and vice captain respectively, and W.S. Perrin was confirmed as the club's secretary and treasurer. The start of the second Gloucestershire Cup tournament was deferred until January due to some clubs being unhappy with the interference the competition had caused with the regular club match schedule the previous season.

The draw for the first round of the Cup was made on the 13 December. Eleven teams entered the competition this year, four more than in its inaugural season, and Eastville Rovers were paired with St Agnes in one of three ties in the opening round. The other fixtures were Warmley v Old Boys, Q.E.H. (who had been known as Globe F.C. until this season) and Clifton v St George. Southville, Wick & Doynton, St Simon, Kingswood, and Craigmore College were all given byes to the second round.

Rovers were victorious against St Agnes, earning them a second-round tie against tournament newcomers Wick & Doynton. This game was played in Warmley, and refereed by world-famous cricketer W. G. Grace, but following a 2–1 defeat to the Eastville club the home team appealed the result, claiming that proper procedures hadn't been followed when appointing the match official. The Gloucestershire FA upheld the complaint and the game was replayed two weeks after the original tie with a new referee taking charge. The standard of the officiating of the replayed match was the subject of some criticism, both by the local press and the crowd in attendance on the day, but the outcome was an identical result to when the game was played originally.

A goalless draw against Kingswood in the semi-final led to a replay on the Chequers Ground, which looked like ending in another stalemate until Walter Perrin grabbed a late winner for Eastville. This earned them their first appearance in the final, where they would face pre-match favourites, and one of the strongest teams in the Bristol area, Warmley. Perrin was again the hero in the final, scoring the only goal at the St George Cricket & Football Club in front of an estimated 3,000 spectators.

== Results ==
=== First team ===
==== Gloucestershire Cup ====
Round	Date	Opponent	Venue	Result	Scorers	Notes
1	26 January 1889	St Agnes	Ashley Hill, Bristol	Won 3–1	Higgins (2), Laurie	
2	16 February 1889	Wick & Doynton	Warmley, Gloucestershire	Won 2–1	Higgins, Attewell	
2 (replay)	2 March 1889	Wick & Doynton	Warmley, Gloucestershire	Won 2–1	Attewell, Perrin	
Semi-final	16 March 1889	Kingswood	The Downs, Bristol	Drew 0–0		
Semi-final (replay)	30 March 1889	Kingswood	Kingswood, Bristol	Won 1–0	Perrin	
Final	6 April 1889	Warmley	St George, Bristol	Won 1–0	Perrin	

==== Club matches ====
Date	Opponent	Venue	Result	Scorers	Notes
29 September 1888	Kingswood	Kingswood, Bristol	Won 8–0	Taylor (2), Hodgson (3), Cade (3)	
6 October 1888	Warmley	The Downs, Bristol	Won 3–1	Higgins, Taylor 2	
13 October 1888	St George	St George, Bristol	Won 2–0	Laurie, Perrin	
20 October 1888	Old Boys, Q.E.H.	Three Acres, Bristol	Won 9–1		
3 November 1888	Clifton	Gloucestershire County Ground	Lost 0–3		
10 November 1888	Swindon Town	Swindon, Wiltshire	Lost 0-7		
1 December 1888	Clifton	Gloucestershire County Ground	Drew 3–3	Taylor, Higgins, Horsey	
15 December 1888	St George	St George, Bristol	Drew 0–0		
22 December 1888	Kingswood	The Downs, Bristol			
29 December 1888	Old Boys, Q.E.H.		Won 3-1		
5 January 1889	Warmley	Warmley, Gloucestershire	Lost 1–3	Higgins	
12 January 1889	St George	St George, Bristol	Drew 3–3		
19 January 1889	Southville	Three Acres	Won 1–0	Channing	see Western daily press 23 Jan 1889
9 February 1889	Swindon Town	Gloucestershire County Ground	Won 6–1	Taylor (3), Perrin (2), Francis	

=== Second team ===
Date	Opponent	Venue	Result	Scorers	Notes
29 September 1888	Kingswood second XI	The Downs, Bristol	Won 2–1	Farrell (2)	
13 October 1888	St Simon	The Downs, Bristol	Won 4–1	Moorhouse (2), Wicks, Ashley	
20 October 1888	Old Boys, Q.E.H. 2nd XI	The Downs, Bristol	Won 1–0		
27 October 1888	St George Reserves	St George, Bristol	Lost 2–5		
10 November 1888	St George Reserves	St George, Bristol	Lost 0-4		
17 November 1888	Kingswood Congregational	Kingswood, Bristol	Lost 0-5		see Western Daily Press 20 11 1888
24 November 1888	St George Reserves	Three Acres, Bristol	Lost 0-3		One goal was disputed
1 December 1888	St Thomas	Three Acres, Bristol	Won 15–0	Lane (3), Ashley (3), Welham (3), Rodburn (2), Laurie (2), Poulson, Smith	
15 December 1888	St George Reserves	Three Acres, Bristol	Lost 1–6		St George played with 10 men
22 December 1888	Kingswood second XI	Kingswood, Bristol			
5 January 1889	St Simon	Eastville Park, Bristol	Won 3–1	A. Laurie, Smith	
9 February 1889	Dolphin	The Downs, Bristol	Drew 1–1		

== Statistics ==
Friendly matches are not included in this section.

Match record
Competition	Home						Away						Total					
Competition	P	W	D	L	F	A	P	W	D	L	F	A	P	W	D	L	F	A
Gloucestershire Cup	1	0	1	0	0	0	4	4	0	0	7	2	5	4	1	0	7	2

Goalscorers
Player	Goals		
Player	League	Cup	Total
Bill Higgins	–	3	3
Walter Perrin	–	3	3
Albert Attwell	–	2	2
Frank Laurie	–	1	1

=== Cumulative record ===
The total cumulative record of Eastville Rovers up to the end of the 1888–89 season is shown below. This is calculated by adding the numbers in the section above to the total games played last season. Friendly matches are not included in this table, and games held at neutral venues are considered to have been played away from home.

As of the summer of 1889, Rovers' competitive matches had all been played in the Gloucestershire Cup.

Match record
Competition	Home						Away						Total					
Competition	P	W	D	L	F	A	P	W	D	L	F	A	P	W	D	L	F	A
Gloucestershire Cup	2	0	1	1	1	4	4	4	0	0	7	2	6	4	1	1	8	6

== Bibliography ==
- Byrne, Stephen; Jay, Mike (2003). Bristol Rovers Football Club: The Definitive History 1883–2003. Stroud: Tempus. ISBN 0-7524-2717-2.
