= 1887–88 Eastville Rovers F.C. season =

Eastville Rovers
1887–88 season
- Captain: Fred Channing
- Ground: The Downs, Bristol

The 1887–88 season was the fifth to be played by the team that are now known as Bristol Rovers, and their fourth playing under the name Eastville Rovers. It marked a major change in the direction of football in Gloucestershire as a County Football Association was established, enabling a formal cup competition to be played in the area for the first time.

== Season review ==
Until 1887 Eastville Rovers had played only friendly matches, but this season began with a meeting at the Montpelier Hotel in Bristol that would change this. On 7 September 1887 W.W. Perrin and T. Channing, on behalf of Eastville Rovers, along with Charles Lacy Sweet and J. Innes-Pocock from Clifton Association and representatives from Warmley, St George, St Agnes, and Southville voted to establish the Gloucestershire County Football Association. This would enable a cup competition to be organised and enable the standardisation of the rules governing matches, which up to this point had not been the case. The delegates unanimously agreed to adopt a slightly modified version of the London Football Association rules, and to convene again a week later to elect officials for the new County FA.

Rovers were given a bye when the first round draw was made the following month, before being paired with Clifton Association in the semi-final. As the first team drawn, Eastville had the choice of where to play the match, and arranged for it to be played at the home ground of St George F.C. Unfortunately for them, Rovers lost forward Harry Horsey to injury early in the game and had to play the majority of the match with ten men, but in spite of this disadvantage it was the Eastville side who took the lead in the first half through Harry Cade. H.H. Francis scored an equaliser for Clifton shortly afterwards to make the half time score 1–1. In the second half Clifton's man advantage began to show, and aided by playing down the slope of the pitch they managed to score a further three goals, thanks to Charles Wreford-Brown, and A.B. Colthurst (x2), making the final result 4–1 to Clifton Association.

As with previous seasons, many of the team's friendly results are not known, but where final scores have been established Eastville Rovers ended the season with five wins and two defeats.

== Results ==
=== First team ===
==== Gloucestershire Cup ====
Round	Date	Opponent	Venue	Result	Scorers	Notes
1		Bye				
Semi-final	14 January 1888	Clifton Association	St George, Bristol	Lost 1–4	Cade	

==== Friendlies ====
Date	Opponent	Venue	Result	Notes
8 October 1887	St George	St George, Bristol	Won 3–2	
15 October 1887	Warmley	The Downs, Bristol	Won 1–0	
5 November 1887	Clifton Association	Clifton, Bristol		
19 November 1887	St George	St George, Bristol		
26 November 1887	Weston-super-Mare	The Recreation Grounds, Weston-super-Mare	Lost 1–2	
10 December 1887	St Agnes	Ashley Hill, Bristol		
17 December 1887	Warmley	Warmley, Gloucestershire	Lost 1–2	
7 January 1888	St George	St George, Bristol	Won 2–0	
21 January 1888	Chippenham Town	Chippenham	Won 3–1	see Bristol Mercury 24 Jan 1888 (1 disputed goal)
28 January 1888	Wotton-under-Edge	The Downs, Bristol	Won 1–0	
4 February 1888	Clifton Association	Clifton, Bristol	Lost 1–4	see Bristol Mercury 6 January 1888
25 February 1888	St George	St George, Bristol		
3 March 1888	St Agnes	Ashley Hill, Bristol		
24 March 1888	Globe	The Downs, Bristol		
31 March 1888	Warmley	Warmley, Gloucestershire	Won 3–0	
7 April 1888	Weston-super-Mare	The Downs, Bristol	Won 3–1	see Bristol Mercury 11 April 1888

=== Second team ===
Date	Opponent	Venue	Result	Notes
15 October 1887	Globe	The Downs, Bristol	Won 2–0	see Bristol Mercury 18 Oct 1887
12 November 1887	Warmley second team	Warmley, Gloucestershire		
19 November 1887	Southville	Bedminster Park, Bristol		
19 November 1887	St Simon's	The Downs, Bristol	Lost 0–1	
17 December 1887	St George second team	St George, Bristol		
7 January 1888	St George second team	St George, Bristol		
28 January 1888	Globe	The Downs, Bristol	Won 1–0	see Bristol Mercury 31 January 1888
4 February 1888	St George second team	The Downs, Bristol		
25 February 1888	Southville	The Downs, Bristol		
17 March 1888	Clifton Association second team	Clifton, Bristol		

== Statistics ==
Friendly matches are not included in this section.

Match record
Competition	Home					
Competition	P	W	D	L	F	A
Gloucestershire Cup	1	0	0	1	1	4

Goalscorers
Player	Goals		
Player	League	Cup	Total
Harry Cade	–	1	1

== Bibliography ==
- Byrne, Stephen; Jay, Mike (2003). Bristol Rovers Football Club: The Definitive History 1883–2003. Stroud: Tempus. ISBN 0-7524-2717-2.
