= Gloucestershire Cup =

- Flag of Gloucestershire
- Organiser(s): Gloucestershire County FA
- Founded: 1887
- Abolished: 1996
- Region: Gloucestershire
- Teams: various
- Related competitions: Gloucestershire Senior Cup
- Last champions: Bristol City (54th title)
- Most championships: Bristol City (54 titles)

Gloucestershire Cup was the informal name of an association football competition held under the auspices of the Gloucestershire County Football Association on 99 occasions from 1887 to 1996. The full name of the competition changed over time: originally the Gloucestershire Football Association Challenge Cup, the introduction of a Junior tournament two years later led to it being renamed the Gloucestershire Football Association Senior Challenge Cup in 1889, then after the advent of professionalism in football it became the Gloucestershire Senior Professional Cup.

It was originally a knockout tournament open to teams in Gloucestershire, but, from 1907–08, became an annual match between the first teams of Bristol Rovers and Bristol City.

== Creation ==
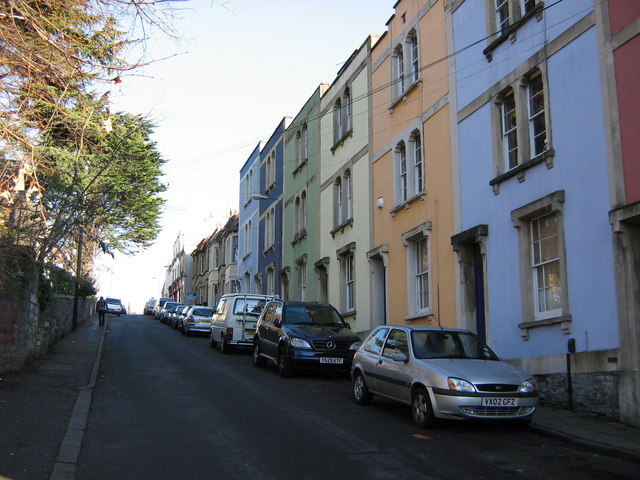
The Montpelier Hotel, visible at the top of the hill, was the birthplace of the Gloucestershire Cup

The Gloucestershire cup was created by Charles Lacy Sweet of Clifton Association F.C. after a meeting in September 1887. Present at the meeting were representatives from Clifton Association, Eastville Rovers (later to become Bristol Rovers), Globe (a team made up of Old Elizabethans), Southville, and church teams St Agnes, St George, and St Simon.

The draw for the first edition of the competition was held at the Montpelier Hotel in Bristol on 5 October 1887 and featured seven entrants. Eastville Rovers were awarded a bye into the second round, while the first round ties drawn were Clifton v St Agnes, Globe v Southville, and Warmley v St George.

=== 1887–88 tournament ===
First Round
Warmley | 2
St George | 1
Second replay
Globe | 1
Southville | 0
Clifton | 5
St Agnes | 0

Semi-finals
Warmley | 8
Globe | 1
at St George
Eastville Rovers | 1
Clifton | 4

Final
Replay, at St George
Warmley | 1
Clifton | 4

== Knockout tournament ==
=== List of tournament finals ===
| Season | Final # | Date | Winner^{[A]} | Score | Runner-up | Goalscorers | Att. | Venue | Ref |
|---|---|---|---|---|---|---|---|---|---|
| 1887–88 | 1 | 10 March 1888 | Clifton | 1–1 | Warmley | J.R. Riddell (Warmley); H.H. Francis (Clifton) | 2,000 | St George | |
| 1887–88 | 1 (replay) | 17 March 1888 | Clifton (1) | 4–1 | Warmley | A.B. Colthurst (2), C.H. Russell (2) (Clifton); Unknown (Warmley) | 2,000 | St George | |
| 1888–89 | 2 | 6 April 1889 | Eastville Rovers (1) | 1–0 | Warmley | W. Perrin | 3,000 | St George | |
| 1889–90 | 3 | 22 March 1890 | Clifton (2) | 5–0 | St George | R. Barlow, A.T. Hingston, R. Innes-Pocock, H.H. Francis | 2,500 | St George | |
| 1890–91 | 4 | 28 March 1891 | Bedminster (1) | 2–0 | Warmley | Griffiths, H.J. Batchelor | 3,000 | St George | |
| 1891–92 | 5 | 12 March 1892 | Warmley (1) | 2–1 | Bedminster | Rev A.B. Macfarlane (Bedminster); J. King, G. Peacock (Warmley) | 6,000 | Kingswood | |
| 1892–93 | 6 | 1 April 1893 | Warmley (2) | 4–1 | Gloucester | N. Britton (2), G. Peacock, W. Phipps (Warmley); W. Sessions (Gloucester) | 3,500 | Kingswood | |
| 1893–94 | 7 | 31 March 1894 | St George (1) | 3–1 | Eastville Rovers | W. Britton (2), D.S. Gerrish (St George); H. Horsey (Eastville) | 4,000 | Kingswood | |
| 1894–95 | 8 | 15 April 1895 | St George (2) | 4–3 | Gloucester | Winstone, Whippie, Harris, Britton (St George); Stout (2), Fielding (Gloucester) | Large | Kingswood | |
| 1895–96 | 9 | 6 April 1896 | Warmley (3) | 1–0 | Eastville Rovers | Bowler | 6,000 | St George | |
| 1896–97 | 10 | 19 April 1897 | Warmley (4) | 2–0 | Bedminster | P. Britton, Stone | 7,000 | St George | |
| 1897–98 | 11 | 11 April 1898 | Bristol City (1) | 2–1 | Warmley | Caie, Higgins (Bristol City); Bishop (Warmley) | 12,000 | Eastville | |
| 1898–99 | 12 | 3 April 1899 | Bristol City (2) | 2–1 | Bristol Rovers | Langham, Murphy (City); Brown (Rovers) | 12,000 | St George | |
| 1899–1900 | 13 | 30 April 1900 | Bedminster (2) | 3–1 | Bristol City | Boucher, Lewis, Geddes (Bedminster); Russell (Bristol City) | 2,000 | Eastville | |
| 1900–01 | 14 | 29 April 1901 | Bristol City (3) | 4–0 | Bristol Rovers | Fulton (2), Wilson, McDougall | 2,800 | St John's Lane | |
| 1901–02^{[B]} | 15 | 31 March 1902 | Bristol Rovers | 0–0 | Bristol City | | 18,000 | Eastville | |
| 1901–02^{[B]} | 15 (replay) | 23 April 1902 | Bristol City | 0–0 | Bristol Rovers | | 4,000 | St John's Lane | |
| 1902–03 | 16 | 13 April 1903 | Bristol Rovers | 0–0 | Bristol City | | 11,790 | Eastville | |
| 1902–03 | 16 (1st replay) | 20 April 1903 | Bristol Rovers | 1–1 | Bristol City | Corbett (Rovers); Banks (City) | 3,000 | St John's Lane | |
| 1902–03 | 16 (2nd replay) | 29 April 1903 | Bristol Rovers (2) | 4–2 | Bristol City | Corbett (2), Marriott, Dunn (pen.) (Rovers); Banks (2) (City) | 5,000 | St John's Lane | |
| 1903–04 | 17 | 4 April 1904 | Bristol City (4) | 2–1 | Bristol Rovers | Corbett, Jones (City); Beats (Rovers) | 10,537 | St John's Lane | |
| 1904–05 | 18 | 24 April 1905 | Bristol Rovers | 2–2 | Bristol City | Capes, Fenton (City); Beats, Smith (Rovers) | 10,000 | Eastville | |
| 1904–05 | 18 (replay) | 28 April 1905 | Bristol Rovers (3) | 3–1 | Bristol City | Beats, Dunkley, Lewis (Rovers); Fisher (City) | 3,000 | Ashton Gate | |
| 1905–06 | 19 | 16 April 1906 | Bristol City (5) | 4–0 | Bristol Rovers | Bennett, Burton, Gilligan, Wedlock | 8,000 | Ashton Gate | |
| 1906–07 | 20 | 1 April 1907 | Bristol City (6) | 2–0 | Bristol Rovers | Gilligan (2) | 11,000 | Eastville | |

^[A] The cumulative number of cup wins for each team is shown in brackets.
^[B] The title was shared between Bristol Rovers and Bristol City in 1901–02 after two matches were played and drawn.

=== Summary of tournament winners ===
It is arguable which team was the most successful of the tournament era. Bristol City's six wins and three runners-up places put them clearly ahead of any other team, but two of these wins and one second place came prior to their merger with Bedminster in 1900. The Western Daily Press at the time clearly considered the merged team to be a new club, distinct from the original, which would make Warmley the most successful team, with four wins and four second places.

| Team | Wins | Runners-up |
|---|---|---|
| Bristol City | 6 (1898, 1899, 1901, 1904, 1906, 1907) | 3 (1900, 1903, 1905) |
| Warmley | 4 (1892, 1893, 1896, 1897) | 4 (1888, 1889, 1891, 1898) |
| Bristol/Eastville Rovers | 3 (1889, 1903, 1905) | 7 (1894, 1896, 1899, 1901, 1904, 1906, 1907) |
| Bedminster | 2 (1891, 1900) | 2 (1892, 1897) |
| St George | 2 (1894, 1895) | 1 (1890) |
| Clifton | 2 (1888, 1890) | 0 |
| Gloucester | 0 | 2 (1893, 1895) |
| No outright winner | 1 (1902) | |

== Bristol City v Bristol Rovers matches ==
There was a growing feeling among teams participating in the tournament that the dominance shown by City and Rovers meant that all other entrants were going into the competition each year knowing that they had no hope of winning. A solution to this problem was put forward at the annual meeting of the Gloucestershire County Football Association (GFA), held at the Crown & Dove Hotel in central Bristol on 2 August 1907. Mr W.H. Haskins, secretary of the GFA, proposed the creation of an intermediate cup competition for teams who were too accomplished to take part in the Junior Cup, but who were unable to compete with Rovers and City in the Senior competition. The proposal carried with unanimous support in the room. From this point on, the Senior Cup would be contested by Rovers and City only each year.

The change in the format of the competition coincided with a move from the final's traditional place in the calendar on Easter Monday, enabling more flexibility with the scheduling of matches.

The 1996 Gloucestershire Cup match was depicted in a series 5 episode of the ITV preschool series Rosie and Jim.

=== List of Bristol City v Bristol Rovers match results ===
| Season | Final # | Date | Winner | Score | Scorers | Att. | Venue | Ref |
|---|---|---|---|---|---|---|---|---|
| 1907–08 | 21 | 29 April 1908 | Bristol City | 2–0 | Burton, Maxwell | 9,000 | Ashton Gate | |
| 1908–09^{[α]} | 22 | 1 September 1909 | Draw | 1–1 | McKenzie (City); Corbett (Rovers) | 10,000 | Eastville | |
| 1908–09^{[α]} | 22 (1st replay) | 13 October 1909 | Draw | 1–1 | Cowell (City); Corbett (Rovers) | 3,000 | Ashton Gate | |
| 1908–09^{[α]} | 22 (2nd replay) | 26 January 1910 | Bristol City | 2–1 | Cowell, Radford (City); Roberts (Rovers) | 2,000 | Eastville | |
| 1909–10 | 23 | 6 April 1910 | Bristol City | 2–0 | Foster (2) | 1,000 | Ashton Gate | |
| 1910–11 | 24 | 19 April 1911 | Bristol City | 1–0 | Foster | 4,000 | Eastville | |
| 1911–12 | 25 | 3 February 1912 | Bristol City | 1–0 | Copestake | 8,966 | Ashton Gate | |
| 1912–13 | 26 | 25 March 1913 | Bristol Rovers | 1–0 | Brogan | 10,000 | Eastville | |
| 1913–14 | 27 | 14 April 1914 | Bristol City | 2–0 | Brown, Harris | 9,000 | Ashton Gate | |
World War I (1914–1918)
| 1919–20 | 28 | 24 September 1919 | Bristol City | 4–0 | Neesam (2), Howarth (2) | 7,000 | Eastville | |
| 1920–21 | 29 | 29 September 1920 | Bristol City | 1–0 | Banfield | 12,000 | Ashton Gate | |
| 1921–22 | 30 | 1 May 1922 | Bristol City | 2–0 | Fairclough, Pocock | 9,000 | Eastville | |
| 1922–23 | 31 | 16 April 1923 | Abandoned after 80 minutes due to poor light with City winning 3–1 | | | 8,000 | Ashton Gate | |
| 1922–23 | 31 (replay) | 7 May 1923 | Bristol City | 1–0 aet | Smith | 4,991 | Ashton Gate | |
| 1923–24 | 32 | 30 April 1924 | Draw | 1–1 | Walsh (City); Phillips (Rovers) | 7,396 | Eastville | |
| 1923–24 | 32 (replay) | 5 May 1924 | Bristol City | 2–0 | Walsh, Torrance | 6,091 | Ashton Gate | |
| 1924–25 | 33 | 27 April 1925 | Draw | 1–1 | Whatmore (Rovers); Walsh (City) | 5,102 | Ashton Gate | |
| 1924–25 | 33 (replay) | 29 April 1925 | Bristol Rovers | 2–0 | Phillips, Morgan | 4,123 | Eastville | |
| 1925–26 | 34 | 19 April 1926 | Bristol City | 4–1 | Keating (3), Paul (City); Holcroft (Rovers) | 3,500 | Eastville | |
| 1926–27 | 35 | 1 January 1927 | Bristol City | 4–0 | Walsh (2, 1 pen), Keating, Martin | 9,601 | Ashton Gate | |
| 1927–28 | 36 | 10 April 1928 | Bristol Rovers | 1–0 | Ormston | 7,600 | Eastville | |
| 1928–29 | 37 | 19 September 1928 | Bristol City | 2–0 | Barber, Williams | 6,923 | Ashton Gate | |
| 1929–30 | 38 | 30 September 1929 | Draw | 0–0 | | 3,000 | Eastville | |
| 1929–30 | 38 (replay) | 22 April 1930 | Bristol City | 4–1 | Vials (2), Johnson, Homer (City); Phillips (Rovers) | 3,962 | Ashton Gate | |
| 1930–31 | 39 | 1 October 1930 | Bristol City | 3–1 | Townrow, Homer (pen), Elliott (City); Dennis (pen) (Rovers) | 5,000 | Ashton Gate | |
| 1931–32 | 40 | 9 September 1931 | Bristol City | 1–0 | Elliott | 11,000 | Eastville | |
| 1932–33 | 41 | 14 September 1932 | Draw | 3–3 | Irving, Eyres, Jackson (Rovers); Homer (2), Bowen (City) | 7,000 | Ashton Gate | |
| 1932–33 | 41 (replay) | 24 April 1933 | Bristol City | 4–3 | Scriven (2), Loftus, Bowen (City); Stoddart, Wyper, McNestry (Rovers) | 5,000 | Eastville | |
| 1933–34 | 42 | 13 September 1933 | Draw | 0–0 | | 8,361 | Eastville | |
| 1933–34 | 42 (replay) | 3 April 1934 | Bristol City | 2–1 | Riley (2) (City); Havelock (Rovers) | 7,000 | Ashton Gate | |
| 1934–35 | 43 | 26 September 1934 | Bristol Rovers | 2–1 | Smith (2, 1 pen) (Rovers); Riley (City) | 5,216 | Ashton Gate | |
| 1935–36 | 44 | 25 September 1935 | Bristol Rovers | 3–1 | Crisp, Wildsmith, Harwood (Rovers); Bradford (City) | 6,293 | Eastville | |
| 1936–37 | 45 | 9 September 1936 | Bristol City | 1–0 | Haycox | 5,000 | Ashton Gate | |
| 1937–38 | 46 | 27 September 1937 | Bristol Rovers | 2–1 | McArthur (2) (Rovers); Brain (City) | 3,648 | Eastville | |
| 1938–39 | 47 | 21 September 1938 | Bristol City | 3–0 | Clayton (2), Gallacher | 2,500 | Ashton Gate | |
World War II (1939–1945)
| 1944–45 | 48 | 26 December 1944 | Bristol City | 5–0 | Clark (4), Owen | 9,048 | Eastville | |
| 1945–46 | 49 | 24 September 1945 | Bristol City | 3–1 | Collins, Clark, Curran (City); Lambden (Rovers) | 7,962 | Ashton Gate | |
| 1946–47 | 50 | 26 May 1947 | Draw | 2–2 | Leamon, Hodges (Rovers); Clark, Collins (City) | 17,151 | Eastville | |
| 1946–47 | 50 (replay) | 7 June 1947 | Bristol City | 2–0 | Williams, Thomas | 11,434 | Ashton Gate | |
| 1947–48 | 51 | 8 May 1948 | Bristol Rovers | 2–1 | Morgan, Watkins (Rovers); Clark (City) | 16,000 | Ashton Gate | |
| 1948–49 | 52 | 14 May 1949 | Bristol Rovers | 2–0 | Lambden, Morgan | 15,111 | Eastville | |
| 1949–50 | 53 | 13 May 1950 | Bristol City | 2–0 | Williams (2) | 17,000 | Ashton Gate | |
| 1950–51 | 54 | 12 May 1951 | Shared | 1–1 | Lambden (Rovers); Boxley (City) | 16,673 | Eastville | |
| 1951–52 | 55 | 10 May 1952 | Bristol City | 2-1 | Jimmy Rogers, Cyril Williams | | | |
| 1952–53 | 56 | 8 May 1953 | Bristol City | 2-0 | John Ayteo, Alois Eisentrager | | | |
| 1953–54 | 57 | 3 May 1954 | Shared | 2-2 | Alois Eisentrager, Cyril Williams | | | |
| 1954–55 | 58 | 2 May 1955 | Bristol Rovers | 2-1 | John Atyeo | | | |
| 1955–56 | 59 | 30 April 1956 | Bristol Rovers | 1-0 | | | | |
| 1956–57 | 60 | 29 April 1957 | Bristol City | 2-1 | John Atyeo, Dermot Curtis | | | |
| 1957–58 | 61 | 29 April 1958 | Bristol City | 4-1 | Bobby Etheridge (2), Dermot Curtis, John Atyeo | | | |
| 1958–59 | 62 | 4 May 1959 | Shared | 1-1 | Bert Tindill | | | |
| 1959–60 | 63 | 2 May 1960 | Bristol City | 3–2 | Atyeo (2), Rogers (City); Biggs (2) (Rovers) | 7,195 | Ashton Gate | |
| 1960–61 | 64 | 1 May 1961 | Bristol City | 3-1 | John Atyeo (2), Jantzen Derrick | | | |
| 1961–62 | 65 | 1 May 1962 | Bristol City | 3-1 | Brian Clark (3) | | | |
| 1962–63 | 66 | 23 May 1963 | Bristol Rovers | 2-1 | Jantzen Derrick | | | |
| 1963–64 | 67 | 28 April 1964 | Shared | 2-2 | Gordon Low, Bobby Williams | | | |
| 1964–65 | 68 | 26 April 1965 | Bristol Rovers | 3-2 | Terry Bush, Brian Clark | | | |
| 1965–66 | 69 | 12 May 1966 | Bristol Rovers | 1-0 | | | | |
| 1966–67 | 70 | 9 May 1967 | Bristol City | 3-0 | Chris Crowe, Tony Ford, Roger Peters | | | |
| 1967–68 | 71 | 14 May 1968 | Shared | 1-1 | Gerry Sharpe | | | |
| 1968–69 | 72 | 28 April 1969 | Bristol City | 5-0 | John Galley, Chris Garland, Bobby Kellard, Gerry Sharpe, Alan Skirton | | | |
| 1969–70 | 73 | 22 April 1970 | Bristol City | 2-1 | Bobby Kellard (2) | | | |
| 1970–71 | 74 | 4 May 1971 | Shared | 1-1 | Keith Fear | | | |
| 1971–72 | 75 | 9 May 1972 | Bristol Rovers | 1–1 (4–2 pen) | Allan (Rovers); Emanuel (City) | 13,137 | Ashton Gate | |
| 1972–73 | 76 | 1 May 1973 | Bristol City | 2–2 (5–3 pen) | Gerry Gow (2) | | | |
| 1973–74 | 77 | 29 April 1974 | Bristol Rovers | 2-0 | | | | |
| 1974–75 | 78 | 29 April 1975 | Bristol Rovers | 2–1 aet | Gary Collier | | | |
| 1975–76 | 79 | 4 May 1976 | Bristol City | 3–2 aet | Jimmy Mann (2), Paul Cheesley | | | |
| 1976–77 | 80 | 24 May 1977 | Bristol City | 1-0 | Jimmy Mann | | | |
| 1977–78 | 81 | 2 May 1978 | Bristol City | 3-0 | Kevin Mabbutt (2), Jimmy Mann | | | |
| 1978–79 | 82 | 15 May 1979 | Bristol City | 2-0 | Gerry Gow, Jimmy Mann | | | |
| 1979–80 | 83 | 6 May 1980 | Bristol City | 1-0 | Howard Pritchard | | | |
| 1980–81 | 84 | 5 May 1981 | Bristol City | 1–0 aet | Kevin Mabbutt | | | |
| 1981–82 | 85 | 8 September 1981 | Bristol Rovers | 1-0 | | | | |
| 1982–83 | 86 | 21 September 1982 | Bristol Rovers | 2-1 | Gary Williams | | | |
| 1983–84 | 87 | 20 September 1983 | Bristol Rovers | 3–2 aet | Howard Pritchard, Glyn Riley | | | |
| 1984–85 | 88 | 21 May 1985 | Bristol Rovers | 3–1 aet | Alan Walsh, Steve White, Paul Bannon, Nick Tanner | | | |
| 1985–86 | 89 | 9 September 1985 | Bristol City | 1–0 | Steve Johnson (pen) | | | |
| 1986–87^{[β]} | 90 | 2 December 1987 | Bristol City | 2–1 | Paul Fitzpatrick (pen), Mike Tanner | | | |
| 1987–88 | 91 | 15 March 1988 | Bristol City | 3–1 | Paul Fitzpatrick, Steve Galliers, John Pender | | | |
| 1988–89 | 92 | 17 August 1988 | Bristol Rovers | 3–0 | Mehew, White | | | |
| 1989–90 | 93 | 8 August 1989 | Bristol Rovers | 2–1 | David Smith | | | |
| 1990–91 | 94 | 15 August 1990 | Bristol City | 4–1 | David Smith, Gary Shelton, Nicky Morgan (2) | | | |
| 1991–92 | 95 | 7 August 1991 | Bristol City | 3–2 | Purnell, Mehew (Rovers), Bob Taylor (2), Rob Edwards (City) | | | |
| 1992–93 | 96 | 5 August 1992 | Bristol Rovers | 2–1 | Cole (City), Mehew, Stewart (Rovers) | | | |
| 1993–94 | 97 | 5 August 1993 | Bristol Rovers | 1–1 (5–3 pen) | Clark (Rovers), Bryant (City) | | | |
| 1994–95 | 98 | 3 August 1994 | Bristol Rovers | 0–0 (11–10 pen) | | | | |
| 1995–96 | 99 | 6 August 1996 | Bristol City | 1–0 | Goater | | | |

^[α] The 1908–09 final was held over to the beginning of the following season due to fixture congestion suffered by City.
^[β] The 1986–87 final was held over to the following season.

Total Bristol City wins: 53 Total Bristol Rovers wins: 27

== Bibliography ==
- Byrne, Stephen; Jay, Mike (2003). Bristol Rovers Football Club - The Definitive History 1883–2003. Stroud: Tempus. ISBN 0-7524-2717-2.
