= George Dennis =

George Dennis may refer to:

- George Dennis (explorer) (1814–1898), British explorer, the author of The Cities and Cemeteries of Etruria
- George R. Dennis (1822–1882), American senator from Maryland
- George Dennis (footballer) (1897–1969), English footballer
- George Washington Dennis (c. 1825–1916), American entrepreneur

== See also ==
- George Denys, English politician
