= Clifford Taylor (cricketer) =

English cricketer

Personal information
- Born: 1 August 1875; Bristol, England
- Died: 10 November 1952 (aged 77); Camberwell, London, England
- Batting: Right-handed

Domestic team information
- Years: Team
- 1899–1900: Gloucestershire
- Source: Cricinfo, 30 March 2014

Clifford Taylor (1 August 1875 – 10 November 1952) was an English cricketer. He played for Gloucestershire between 1899 and 1900, and also played football for Clifton.
