= Syd Homer =

English footballer

Personal information
- Full name: Sydney Homer
- Date of birth: 14 January 1903
- Place of birth: Bloxwich, England
- Date of death: 22 January 1983 (aged 80)
- Place of death: Walsall, England
- Position: Outside right

Youth career
- Bloxwich White Star & Bloxwich Strollers

Senior career*
Years	Team	Apps	(Gls)
1925–1927	Wolverhampton Wanderers	29	(1)
1927–1929	Bristol Rovers	38	(5)
1929–1934	Bristol City	179	(18)
1934–19??	Worcester City		
- * Club domestic league appearances and goals

Sydney Homer (14 January 1903 — 22 January 1983) was an English footballer who played as an outside right. He made over 240 Football League appearances in the years before the Second World War.

== Career ==
Syd Homer played for Bristol City.

== Honours ==
with Bristol City

- Welsh Cup winners 1934

with Bloxwich Strollers

- Birmingham Combination winner: 1924–25
