= Jerry Morgan =

English footballer

Personal information
- Full name: Frederick Jerry Morgan
- Date of birth: 5 November 1897
- Place of birth: Bristol, England
- Date of death: 9 May 1953 (aged 55)
- Place of death: Bristol, England
- Height: 5 ft 10 in (1.78 m)
- Position: Inside left

Senior career*
Years	Team	Apps	(Gls)
1912	Fishponds City		
1913	Caerphilly Town		
1919	Bristol City	2	(0)
1919–1925	Bristol Rovers	114	(25)
1925	Sheffield Wednesday		
1927	Showmans Guild		
1927	Bristol City Wednesday		
1931	Bristol South Wednesday		
- * Club domestic league appearances and goals

Frederick "Jerry" Morgan was a professional footballer who played for Bristol Rovers between 1919 and 1925, having previously played 2 games for Bristol City. He was part of a large footballing family from Barton Hill in Bristol His brother Jim played for Wolves, and brother Tom played for Bristol City. His nephew William James Morgan also obtained 104 caps for Bristol Rovers between 1946 and 1952. Jerry Morgan scored two hat tricks for Rovers, one against Worksop Town in a famous 9-0 cup victory in 1920, and the other against Norwich in 1923.

He served in the Royal Navy during World War I as a stoker on board the dreadnought HMS Marlborough. He died of throat cancer in Bristol in 1953.

== Sources ==
- Byrne, Stephen; Jay, Mike (1994). Pirates in Profile. Bedminster, Bristol: Potten Barber and Murray Ltd. p. 174. ISBN 0-9524835-0-5.
