= Howard Gallier =

English footballer

Personal information
- Date of birth: 11 June 1872
- Place of birth: Birmingham, England
- Date of death: 1955 (aged 82)
- Place of death: Bristol, England
- Position(s): Forward

Senior career*
| Years | Team | Apps | (Gls) |
| 1895–1898 | Eastville Rovers | | |
| 1898 | Singers | 1 | |
- *Club domestic league appearances and goals

Howard Gallier (11 June 1872–1955) was an association football forward, who was a key figure in the early history of Eastville Rovers Football Club (later renamed Bristol Rovers).

Gallier was born in the Aston area of Birmingham in 1872, and moved to Bristol in the mid-1890s. He began playing for Eastville Rovers in 1895, and was the club's top scorer for his first two seasons playing for them, netting 15 times in the 1895–96 season and a further eight times in 1896–97. He played a single game for Singers F.C. (later Coventry City) in the Birmingham & District League in 1898.
