= Jimmy Morgan =

English footballer

Personal information
- Full name: William James Morgan
- Date of birth: 19 June 1922
- Place of birth: Bristol, England
- Date of death: 11 October 1976 (aged 54)
- Place of death: Bristol, England
- Positions: Inside forward; outside forward

Senior career*
| Years | Team | Apps | (Gls) |
| 1945–1952 | Bristol Rovers | 104 | (24) |
| 1952–???? | Stonehouse | | |
- * Club domestic league appearances and goals

William James Morgan (19 June 1922 – 11 October 1976) was a professional footballer who played in The Football League for Bristol Rovers immediately after the Second World War. Jimmy was a member of the Barton Hill Morgan footballing family which included his uncles Jerry Morgan (Bristol Rovers), Tom Morgan (Bristol City), Fred Morgan (Bristol City) and Jim Morgan (Wolverhampton Wanderers).

Prior to his footballing career Morgan had served in the Royal Marines during the war and took part in the Normandy Landings in 1944. Following the conclusion of hostilities Morgan was offered a contract with Sheffield Wednesday, but rejected the deal and opted instead to join his home town team Bristol Rovers.

In seven years with The Pirates Morgan played in 104 League games and scored 24 goals, before joining non-League side Stonehouse in 1952.

== Sources ==
- Jay, Mike; Byrne, Stephen (1994). Pirates in Profile: A Who's Who of Bristol Rovers Players. Bristol: Potten, Baber & Murray. pp. 175–176. ISBN 0-9524835-0-5.
