= Irvine Harwood =

English footballer (1905–1973)

Personal information
- Date of birth: 5 December 1905
- Place of birth: Bradford, Yorkshire, England
- Date of death: 26 June 1973 (aged 67)
- Place of death: Walsall, Staffordshire, England
- Position: Centre forward

Senior career*
Years	Team	Apps	(Gls)
- Bradford Park Avenue
1932–1933	Bradford City	5	(0)
- Wolverhampton Wanderers
- * Club domestic league appearances and goals

Irvine Harwood (5 December 1905 – 26 June 1973) was an English professional footballer who played as a centre forward.

== Career ==
Born in Bradford, Harwood played for Bradford Park Avenue, Bradford City and Wolverhampton Wanderers.

For Bradford City he made 5 appearances in the Football League.

== Sources ==
- Frost, Terry (1988). Bradford City A Complete Record 1903-1988. Breedon Books Sport. ISBN 0-907969-38-0.
