= George McNestry =

English footballer

Personal information
- Date of birth: 7 January 1908
- Place of birth: Chopwell, England
- Date of death: March 1998 (aged 90)
- Place of death: Gateshead, England
- Height: 5 ft 9 in (1.75 m)
- Position: Outside right

Youth career
- ????–1926: Chopwell Institute

Senior career*
Years	Team	Apps	(Gls)
1926–1927	Bradford Park Avenue	14	(1)
1927–1928	Doncaster Rovers	9	(1)
1928–1929	Leeds United	3	(0)
1929–1930	Sunderland	4	(0)
1930–1932	Luton Town	69	(26)
1932–1935	Bristol Rovers	113	(42)
1935–1937	Coventry City	46	(20)
Total		258	(90)
- * Club domestic league appearances and goals

George McNestry (7 January 1908 – March 1998) was a professional footballer who played as an outside forward in The Football League for seven different teams between 1926 and 1937. He is the only player to have won the Division Three (South) Cup in two successive seasons, winning it with Bristol Rovers in 1935 and Coventry City in 1936.

McNestry, who was born in Chopwell, County Durham, started his footballing career playing for his home town club Chopwell Institute. In 1926 he had an unsuccessful trial with Arsenal and in August that year joined Bradford Park Avenue, with whom he made his Football League debut. He failed to settle with a club early in his career, only staying for a single season with Bradford and each of his next three clubs; Doncaster Rovers, Leeds United, and Sunderland.

After joining Luton Town in 1930, McNestry finally became a first team regular and scored 26 times in 69 League games during a two-year stay. He joined Bristol Rovers in 1932 and stayed there for three years, playing 113 games and scoring 42 goals, before moving to Coventry City for two years from 1935.

== Sources ==
- Jay, Mike; Byrne, Stephen (1994). Pirates in Profile: A Who's Who of Bristol Rovers Players. Bristol: Potten, Baber & Murray. pp. 163–164. ISBN 0-9524835-0-5.
- Byrne, Stephen; Jay, Mike (2003). Bristol Rovers Football Club - The Definitive History 1883-2003. Stroud: Tempus. p. 501. ISBN 0-7524-2717-2.
