= Bill Pocock =

English footballer

Personal information
- Full name: William Thomas Pocock
- Date of birth: 24 February 1894
- Place of birth: Bristol, England
- Date of death: 4 February 1959
- Place of death: Bristol, England
- Height: 5 ft 7 1/2 in (1.71 m)
- Position: Outside left

Youth career
- Bedminster St Francis

Senior career*
Years	Team	Apps	(Gls)
- Army
1919–1926	Bristol City	238	(46)
1926–1927	St Johnstone	24	(1)
1927–1928	Bath City		
- * Club domestic league appearances and goals

William Thomas Pocock (24 February 1894 — 4 February 1959) was an English footballer who played as an outside left.

== Career ==
Bill Pocock played locally for Bedminster St Francis before joining the Army. Joe Palmer signed him in July 1919 for Bristol City.

== Honours ==
with Bristol City

- Football League Third Division South winner: 1922–23
- FA Cup semi-finalist 1920
