= George Dennis (footballer) =

English footballer (1897–1969)

Personal information
- Full name: George Thomas Dennis
- Date of birth: 12 September 1897
- Place of birth: Moira, Leicestershire, England
- Date of death: 1969 (aged 71–72)
- Position: Winger

Senior career*
Years	Team	Apps	(Gls)
1913–1914	Stanton		
1914–1915	Gresley Rovers		
1919–1920	Coalville Swifts		
1920	Newhall Swifts		
1920–1924	Nottingham Forest	30	(3)
1924–1929	Luton Town	139	(41)
1929–1930	Norwich City	1	(0)
1930–1931	Bristol Rovers	26	(4)
1931–1932	Burton Town		
1932	Gresley Rovers		
Total		196	(48)
- * Club domestic league appearances and goals

George Thomas Dennis (12 September 1897 – 1969) was an English footballer who played in the Football League for Bristol Rovers, Luton Town, Norwich City and Nottingham Forest.
