= Waverley F.C. =

Coordinates: 51.4346°N 2.5660°W

Waverley
- Full name: Waverley Football Club
- Founded: 1889
- Ground: Wells Road, Totterdown

Waverley F.C. was an English association football club based in Bristol during the Victorian era. Founded in 1889 as an offshoot of Waverley Cricket Club, they were founding members of the second division of the Western Football League (known at the time as the Bristol & District League), and finished bottom of the table in both the 1893–94 and 1894–95 seasons. They moved into the South Bristol & District League in the summer of 1895.

Their home ground was behind the Talbot Inn on Wells Road in Knowle.

The club appointed local member of parliament Edward Stock Hill as president upon their formation, and a year later fellow MP William Henry Wills was given the role of vice-president.
