= Bristol Mercury (newspaper) =

The Bristol Mercury was a newspaper published in the English city of Bristol between 1716 and 1909.

The first edition in 1716 was published by Henry Greep.

It was relaunched in 1747 as the Weekly Intelligencer, and again in 1790 with William Bulgin and Robert Rosser as proprietors with a liberal outlook.

In the first half of the 19th century, William Henry Somerton was writing for the Mercury, including reporting the Bristol Riots of 1831, which took place after the House of Lords rejected the second Reform Bill. The reporting and coverage of other issues of the day, in which the Mercury was seen as 'reformist', along with other regional papers, was influential in the reform of parliament in 1832. His sons followed him in working for the paper. In 1836, the Mercury started using a Napier printing press.

In addition to covering local and national news stories by local reporters, the Mercury carried syndicated content from other papers. This included poetry and in 1840 published two to four poems in each weekly edition. Extensive coverage was also given to social issues of the time.

By 1864, the Mercury was widely distributed throughout the south west of England and south Wales.

In 1878, the paper installed new rotary printing presses in offices in Broad Street moving from its earlier premises in Tower Lane.

The Mercury combined with the Daily Post to become the Bristol Mercury and Daily Post from 1878 to 1901 and then the Bristol Daily Mercury until its closure in 1909. Between 1878 and 1909, a weekly supplement known as the Bristol Weekly Mercury was also produced.
