= St John's Lane =

Football ground in Bristol, England

- Location: Bristol, England
- Coordinates: 51.4351°N 2.5954°W
- Record attendance: 17,909
- Surface: Grass
- Opened: 1894

Tenants
- Bristol City

St John's Lane was a football ground in Bristol, England. It was the home ground of Bristol City between 1894 and 1904.

== History ==
The ground began to be used in 1894 by Bristol South End (later Bristol City). A 500-seat stand was built on the western touchline and embankments raised at each end of the pitch. As the ground was overlooked by a hill, a system of screening was created that involved raising canvas sheets on tall poles using pulleys whilst the football club were playing.

Bristol City were elected to the Second Division of the Football League in 1901, and the first Football League match at St John's Lane was played on 14 September 1901, with City beating Stockport County 3–0 in front of 7,000 spectators. The record attendance of 17,909 as set on 6 February 1904 for an FA Cup first round match against Sheffield United.

At the end of the 1903–04 season Bristol City moved to Ashton Gate. The final League match at St John's Lane was played on 23 April 1904, with 4,000 watching City defeat Burslem Port Vale 2–1.

St John's Lane remained in use as a sports ground with the sports and social club associated with E. S. & A. Robinson being based there until its closure. It later became the home of Broad Plain Rugby Club, alongside a housing estate that was built on part of the site. The main road through the estate was named Bristol South End.
