= Ridgeway, Bristol =

Ridgeway
- Location within Bristol
- OS grid reference: ST 6284 7503
- Unitary authority: Bristol
- Ceremonial county: Bristol
- Region: South West
- Country: England
- Sovereign state: United Kingdom
- Post town: BRISTOL
- Postcode district: BS16
- Dialling code: 0117
- Police: Avon and Somerset
- Fire: Avon
- Ambulance: South Western
- UK Parliament: Bristol East

Ridgeway is a suburban area of Bristol, located in the east of the city between Fishponds, Speedwell and Eastville.

It is a mainly residential area and has a playing field, which was home to Eastville Rovers Football Club (now known as Bristol Rovers) from 1893 until they moved to Eastville Stadium in 1897.
