= Warmley F.C. =

- Full name: Warmley Football Club
- Nickname: the Whiteshirts
- Founded: 1882
- Dissolved: 1899
- Ground: Ingleside Road
Home colours

Warmley F.C. was a football club based in Warmley, near Kingswood, Gloucestershire, England.

== History ==
The club was formed in 1882. They are widely regarded as playing the first organised football match in the Bristol region against St George.

Alongside Clifton, St George, and Eastville Rovers, they were founder members of the Gloucestershire F.A. They were also one of the founding members of the Bristol & District League (now the Western Football League) in 1892, winning the title four times in their history.

With the advent of professionalism in the Western League in 1897, St George approached Warmley with a proposal to merge the two clubs. The feeling among members of St George was that Bristol was not large enough to support four professional clubs (Bristol City, Eastville Rovers, Warmley, and St George) and that by pooling their resources a new merged team would be the strongest club in the city. Warmley, however, rejected the proposal and the merger never took place.

In 1896, Warmley joined the Second Division of the Southern League, before both Bristol City and Bristol Rovers. The 1897–98 season saw the club finishing in second place to Royal Artillery (forerunners to Portsmouth) in the process becoming the first team in the Southern League to score 100 goals in a season.

The club now competed in the First Division alongside other Bristol sides City and Bedminster. Only seventeen matches were completed before the club folded in February 1899.

A new club formed and entered the Western League again in 1903. The club resigned in the 1904–05 season and its season record was expunged.

== Colours ==
The club wore white shirts and blue shorts.

== Ground ==
The club's original ground was behind the Tennis Court Inn at the bottom of Warmley Hill. In 1897, it moved to a ground on Ingleside Road, near the Chequers.

== Honours ==
- Southern Football League Second Division runners up 1898
- Western Football League/Bristol & District League champions 1893, 1894, 1896, 1897

== Sources ==
- The Official Centenary History of the Southern League ISBN 1-871872-08-1
- Football Club History Database
