= Clifton Association F.C. =

English football club

- Full name: Clifton Association Football Club
- Founded: 1884
- Dissolved: 1897
- Ground: Chequers Ground
- Secretary: C. E. Newnham
Home colours

Clifton Association Football Club, later known as Clifton Football Club, was a football club based in the Clifton area of Bristol in the late 19th century.

== History ==
The club was founded in 1884, as Clifton Association, to avoid confusion with the rugby side Clifton Football Club; in its first couple of seasons, it relied heavily on Eton College players during the holidays, including most notably future England international Charles Wreford-Brown.

At the end of the 1880s the club was struggling with debts, but the club nevertheless resolved in 1890 to enter the FA Cup in the following season. Its best run was to the final qualifying round - equivalent of the third round today - in the 1891–92 FA Cup qualifying rounds; at that final stage the club lost 3–0 at home to Luton Town.

Clifton Association was a founder member of the Western League (then called the Bristol and District League) in 1892, and was instrumental in the creation of the Gloucestershire Cup competition in the 1887–88 season; indeed, Clifton was the first winner, beating Warmley in a final replay. Its second and final triumph in the competition came in 1889–90, a 5–0 win over St George in the final made all the more impressive as the game took place on St George's ground.

In 1893 the word Association was dropped from their name, which became Clifton. For the 1897–98 season, the Western League was split between professional and amateur sides, and Clifton was placed in the first division of the amateur section. However, after 1 win and 3 defeats in 4 matches, the club ran out of members and money, a considerable sum owing to the honorary secretary A. W. Francis, who had kept the club going. In December 1897 the club therefore disbanded.

== Colours ==
The club's colours were chocolate and cardinal, although in 1893 they were described as red and black.

== Ground ==
The club started out on public grounds, near a reservoir on the Downs, By 1889 they were playing at the Gloucester County Cricket Ground, but forced out by Bristol R.F.C. in 1892, and moved to the Chequers Ground in Kingswood.

== League history ==
| Season | League | Position | W | D | L | F | A |
|---|---|---|---|---|---|---|---|
| 1892–93 | Bristol & District League | 7th of 9 | 4 | 2 | 10 | 27 | 61 |
| 1893–94 | Bristol & District League | 6th of 10 | 6 | 4 | 8 | 37 | 30 |
| 1894–95 | Bristol & District League | 8th of 12 | 8 | 2 | 12 | 47 | 55 |
| 1895–96 | Western League | 6th of 11 | 8 | 3 | 9 | 44 | 50 |
| 1896–97 | Western League | 9th of 9 | 4 | 1 | 11 | 19 | 47 |
| 1897–98 | Western League | Resigned, record expunged | | | | | |

== Further reading and external links ==
- Clifton Association Football Club
- Clifton Association from Football Club History Database (retrieved 20 October 2007).
- Clifton from Football Club History Database (retrieved 20 October 2007).
- Byrne, Stephen; Jay, Mike (2003). Bristol Rovers Football Club – The Definitive History 1883–2003. Stroud: Tempus. ISBN 0-7524-2717-2.
