= Warmley =

Village in United Kingdom

Coordinates: 51.4600°N 2.4776°W

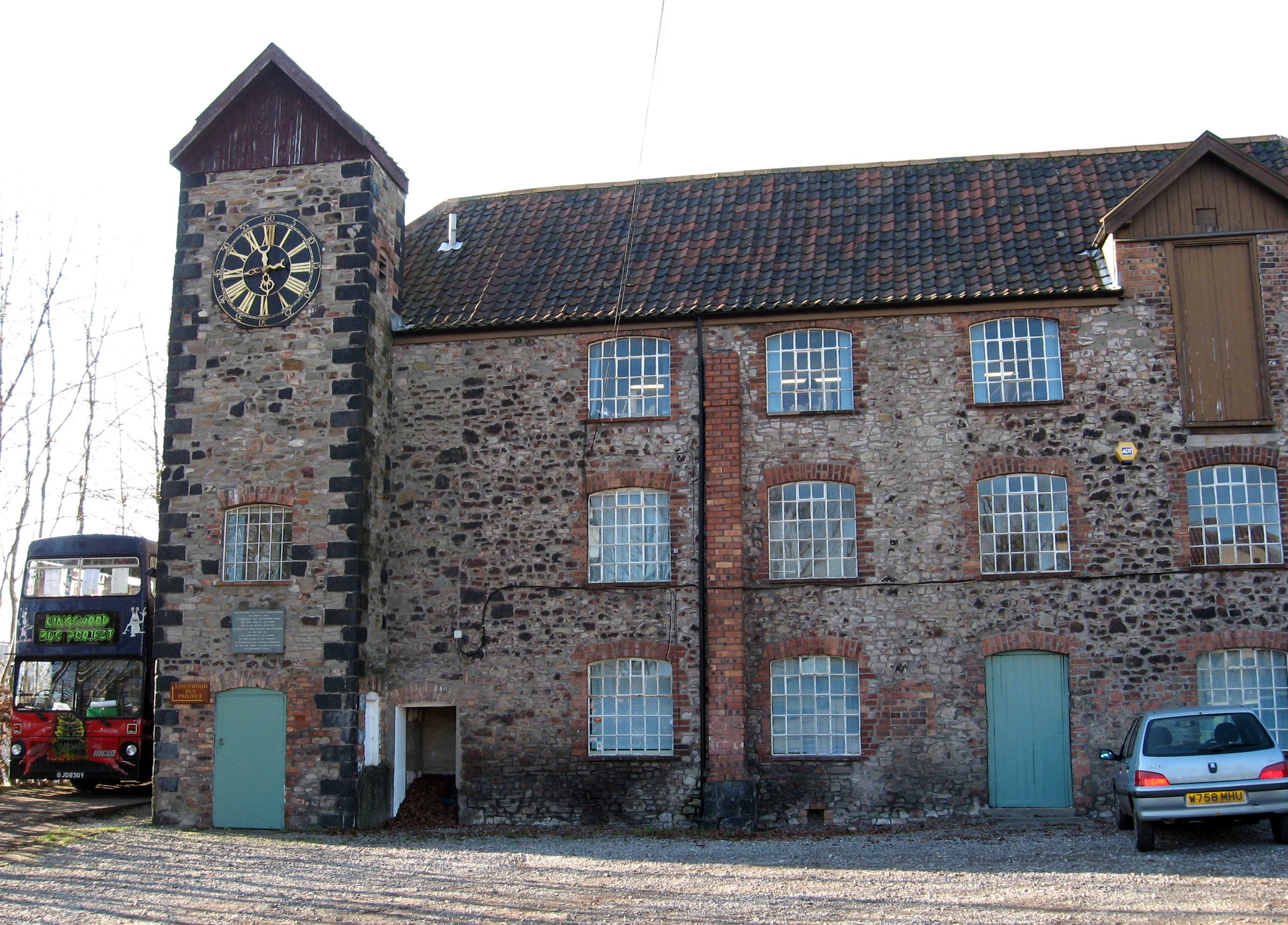
- Former pin factory in Warmley
- Unitary authority: South Gloucestershire
- Ceremonial county: Gloucestershire
- Region: South West
- Country: England
- Sovereign state: United Kingdom
- Post town: Bristol
- Postcode district: BS15, BS30
- Police: Avon and Somerset
- Fire: Avon
- Ambulance: South Western
- UK Parliament: North East Somerset and Hanham

Warmley is a village in the South Gloucestershire district in the ceremonial county of Gloucestershire, England.

Warmley is situated in between Bristol and Bath. It is a parish, with its own church, and has some minor landmarks, such as a World War One memorial the focus of remembrance services, and a statue of Neptune. It has a main lane, the High Street, having a Tesco and a post office, as well as a barber. The former bicycle shop has been converted to flats.

The war memorial bears the names of the parishioners who fell in the Great War.

== Transport ==
The A420 road runs through the village and connects with the Avon Ring Road immediately west of the village. Beyond Warmley the road routes west towards Bristol and east towards Chippenham.

The Midland Railway's line from Bristol as part of the Mangotsfield and Bath branch line used to run through the village but closed in the 1960s. The National Cycle Network Bristol & Bath Railway Path runs along the trackbed of the old railway. The old railway station is now a cafe and opposite stands the signalbox which is open most weekends.

The village is served by six bus routes, three of which run to Bristol city centre. In numerical order:

- 19 Cribbs Causeway to Bath via Bitton and Kelston
- 35 Marshfield to Bristol city centre
- 43 Cadbury Heath to Bristol city centre
- 634 Kingswood to Tormarton
