= Kingswood, South Gloucestershire =

Town in Gloucestershire, England

Coordinates: 51.46°N 2.505°W

Kingswood
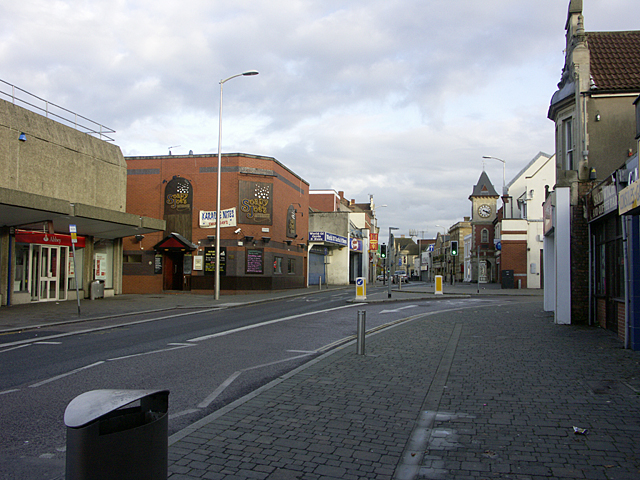
- Regent Street, Kingswood

- Location within Gloucestershire
- Population: 40,734
- OS grid reference: ST649736
- Civil parish: Kingswood
- Unitary authority: South Gloucestershire
- Ceremonial county: Gloucestershire
- Region: South West
- Country: England
- Sovereign state: United Kingdom
- Post town: BRISTOL
- Postcode district: BS15
- Dialling code: 0117
- Police: Avon and Somerset
- Fire: Avon
- Ambulance: South Western
- UK Parliament: Bristol North East

Kingswood is a town and civil parish in the South Gloucestershire district of the ceremonial county of Gloucestershire, England. The town is in the Bristol Built-up Area, situated 3 miles (4.8 km) east-northeast of Bristol city centre. In 2023 it had a population of 48,474.

Broadly speaking, Kingswood spans the area from John Cabot Academy in the west to the A4174 ring road in the east. Some areas which are in close proximity to Kingswood, such as Two Mile Hill and St George East (both located within the City of Bristol) and parts of Hanham and Warmley Hill are often considered to be part of Kingswood by locals. The border between South Gloucestershire and the City of Bristol is situated at the western end of Kingswood's High Street, meaning that anything west of this point is no longer Kingswood civil parish, though locals often consider the shops and residential areas that fringe Two Mile Hill to be a continuation of Kingswood neighbourhood.

== Governance ==
In 1894 Kingswood became an urban district. On 1 April 1974 the urban district and civil parish were abolished when the town became part of the Kingswood district of Avon. In 1996, Kingswood became part of the South Gloucestershire district. The Kingswood civil parish was recreated on 1 April 2023.

== Royal forest ==
In Saxon times, The 'King's Wood' was a royal hunting estate which surrounded Bristol, extending as far as Filwood in South Bristol. "From early days the Constable of Bristol Castle, the king's officer in the area, was also the Chief Ranger of the Kingswood Forest and the first of these recorded is Ella who died in 920. At the edge of the forest, to the north of the River Froom, lay the little hamlet of Stapleton, the name of which is Saxon in origin, being held to mean 'The farm, homestead or croft - by or near the Stapol, post or pillar.'"

== Demography ==
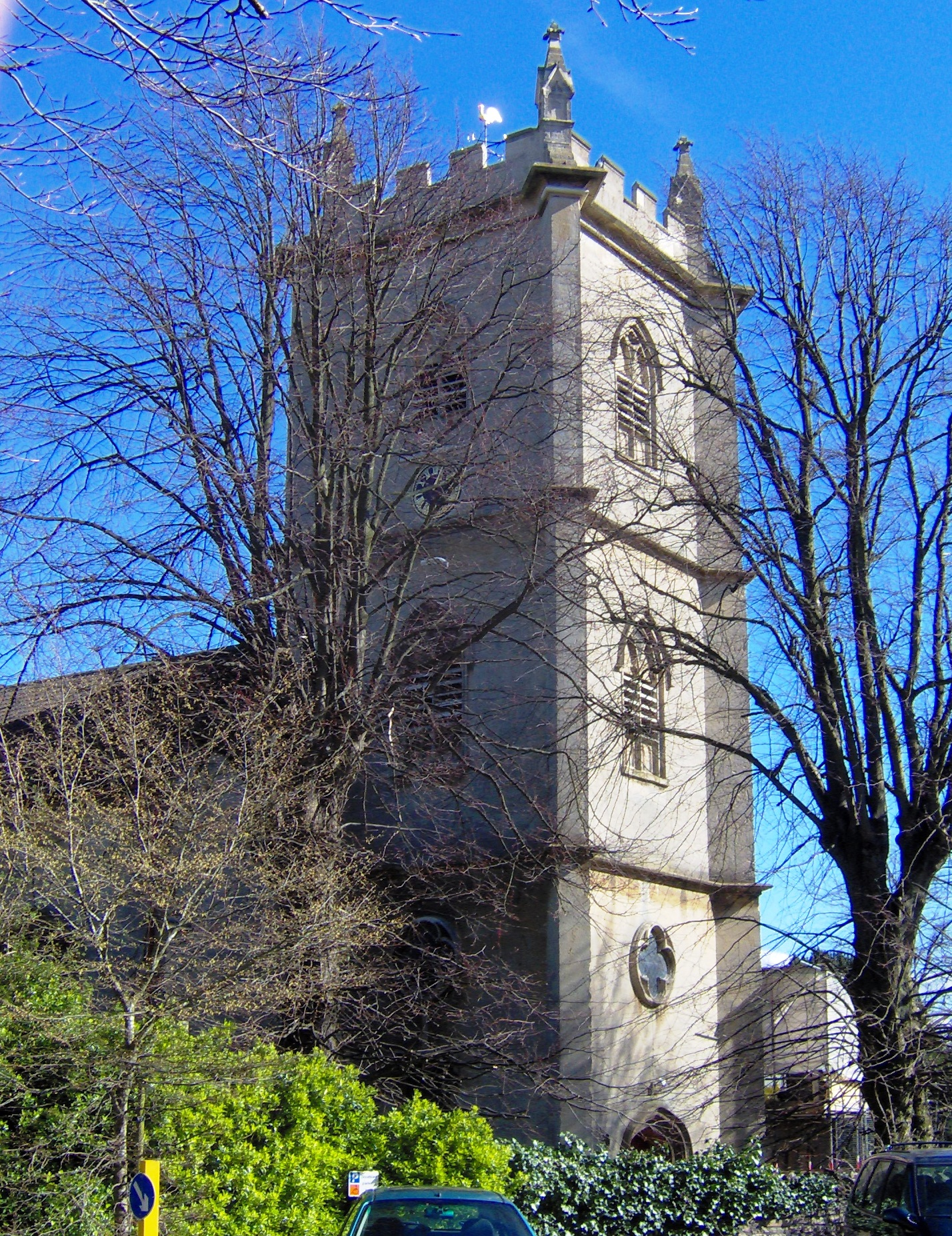
Holy Trinity Church

Kingswood is made up of three electoral wards: Woodstock, New Cheltenham and Kingswood Wards. These wards had a combined population of 40,734 in 2011, with a largely white British population.

== Transport ==
Kingswood High Street is situated around 3 miles (5 km) south of the M4 and 2.5 miles (4 km) east of Lawrence Hill railway station. Buses connect the town to surrounding areas including the City Centre, Southmead Hospital, Keynsham and Cribbs Causeway. Six national rail stations currently exist within South Gloucestershire. However, they are all concentrated around the highly developed North Fringe area which encompasses Filton and Bradley Stoke. However, Bristol mayor Marvin Rees' proposals for a 'Bristol Underground' envisage a line serving the East Fringe of Bristol.

== Coal mining ==
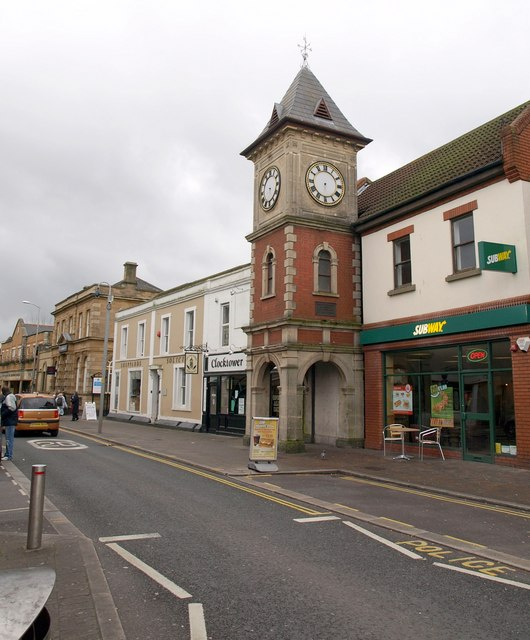
Clock Tower

The Kingswood area first came into industrial prominence in the late 17th century, because of coal mining. Typical of these were coal fields in the Easton and Coalpit Heath/Yate areas. The coal mining history still affects the town with gardens occasionally opening up. The local MP has petitioned in Parliament for full surveys of the coal mines under the town.

== The Whit Walk ==
There is an annual procession held on the morning of the Whit Bank Holiday. Its origins are uncertain, but it appears to have taken place at least since 1939. The walk is the subject of an ethnographic study by the English anthropologist Timothy Jenkins.
