= Bedminster F.C. =

Bedminster
- Full name: Bedminster Football Club
- Founded: 1887
- Dissolved: 1900
- Ground: Ashton Gate, Bristol
- 1899–1900: Southern League Division One, 6/15; Western League Division One, 2/4
Home colours

Bedminster F.C. was an English football club based in Bristol. The club was established in 1887 as Southville and played at Ashton Gate. They were founder members of the Bristol & District League in 1892, which became the Western League in 1895. In 1897–98 they won Division One Amateur of the league, and at the end of the season the club turned professional and also entered a team into the Southern League.

In 1900 the club merged into local rivals Bristol City and ceased to exist. City played at St John's ground until 1904 when they moved to Ashton Gate.
