= Roman Glass St George F.C. =

Association football club in England

Coordinates: 51°32′56.6″N 2°34′19.3″W

Roman Glass St. George
- Full name: Roman Glass St. George Football Club
- Nickname: The Glass
- Founded: 1872
- Ground: Oaklands Park, Almondsbury
- Capacity: 2,000
- Chairman: Roger Hudd
- Manager: Chris Lines
- League: Hellenic League Premier Division
- 2025–26: Hellenic League Premier Division, 2nd of 20
| Home colours | Away colours |

Roman Glass St George Football Club is a football club based in the Bristol suburb of St George, Bristol, England. Founded in 1872, they are the oldest club in Bristol. They are currently members of the Hellenic League Premier Division and play at Oaklands Park, South Gloucestershire. The club is affiliated to the Gloucestershire County FA.

== History ==
The club was formed in 1872 and sometimes playing as just St George or as Bristol St George, they were among the founder members of the original Bristol & District League (since 1895 known as the Western League) in 1892, playing in that league with the exception of 1899–1901 until 1903. During that period, the team also played in the Birmingham & District League and won the Gloucestershire FA Senior Challenge Cup on two occasions 1894 and 1895.

After dropping back to local football, they did not re-appear in the Western League until 1928, for a seven-season period in Division Two, when they only finished in the top half of the table once. After finishing bottom in 1934–35, they once again left the Western League for the Bristol and District League. They won the first division in 1949/50 and became founder members of the Bristol Premier Combination in 1957.

During the 1960s, the club while playing in the Bristol Premier Combination, won the Division One title five seasons in a row from 1963 to 1968.

In 1968, the Gloucestershire County League was formed, with St George among the founder members. They were runners-up in the first season, winning the title in 1969–70 and finished as runners-up again in 1972–73. Despite staying in the league for a further fourteen seasons (including three when known as Immediate Bristol St George), they did not finish in the top two again until being expelled from the league in 1987 due to sub standard facilities. The club played in the County of Avon Premier Combination, winning Division One in 1988–90, finishing as Premier Division runners-up on 1990–91 and eventually won the Premier Division two years later. However, despite winning the Premier Division the club was not promoted and over the next few seasons were in danger of folding.

=== Roman Glass merger ===
In 1995 St George amalgamated with local side Roman Glass, forming Roman Glass St George F.C. Roman Glass originated as a street team called Wyndham Wanderers in 1960 and played in the Bristol Church of England League until joining the Bristol and District League in 1974. The club enjoyed moderate success gradually climbing the leagues and in 1980 changed its name to Roman Glass. The club began to decline until in 1990 Roger Hudd took over as manager and won the Division 4 title and then gaining successive promotions until the amalgamation with Bristol St George.

The amalgamation enjoyed instant success with the club achieving promotion back to the Premier Division in the 1995–96 season. They then joined the Gloucestershire County League in 1999, and within three seasons had won that league as well. Another County League triumph in 2006–07 earned them a further promotion to the Western League Division One for 2007–08, where in their first season, the club finished safely in mid-table. They have remained in Division One ever since.

== Ground ==
Roman Glass St George play their home games at Oaklands Park, Gloucester Road, Almondsbury, BS32 4AG.

The club have moved to their current ground, the home of the Gloucestershire FA, for the 2011–12 season, from their old ground on Whiteway Road.

== Honours ==
=== League honours ===
- Western League Premier Division
  - Runners-up (3): 1893–94, 1894–95, 1898–99
- Western League Division one
  - Runners-up (1): 1902–03
- Gloucestershire County League
  - Winners (3): 1969–70, 2001–02, 2006–07
  - Runners-up (2): 1968–69, 1972–73
- Bristol Premier Combination Premier Division (also known as the County of Avon Premier Combination)
  - Winners (1): 1992–93
  - runners-up (1): 1990–91
- Bristol Premier Combination Division One (also known as the County of Avon Premier Combination)
  - Winners (6): 1963–64, 1964–65, 1965–66, 1966–67, 1967–68, 1988–89
- Bristol and District League Premier Division
  - runners-up (2):1893–94, 1894–95
- Bristol and District League Division One
  - Winners (1): 1949–50
  - runners-up (4): 1924–25, 1926–27, 1936–37, 1937–38

=== Cup honours ===
- Gloucestershire Senior Challenge Cup
  - Winners (2): 1893–94, 1894–95
- Gloucestershire Senior Amateur Cup
  - Winners (8): 1931–32, 1938–39, 1952–53, 1960–61, 1963–64, 1965–66, 1966–67, 1967–68
  - Runners-up (5): 1926–27, 1935–36, 1970–71, 1973–74, 1998–99

== Club records ==
=== Bristol St George FC ===
- Highest League Position: 2nd in Western League Premier Division, 1898–99
- Best FA Cup performance: Second qualifying round, 1953–54
- Best FA Vase performance: Third round, 1975–76, 1979–80
- Best FA Amateur Cup performance: Second round, 1967–68, 1969–70 (replay)

=== Immediate Bristol St George FC ===
- Highest League Position: 5th in Gloucestershire County League, 1981–82
- Best FA Vase performance: Second round, 1981–82

=== Roman Glass St George FC ===
- Highest League Position: 6th in Hellenic League Premier Division, 2022–23
- Best FA Cup performance: First qualifying round, 2022–23
- Best FA Vase performance: Fifth round, 2024–25

== Former coaches ==
1. Managers/Coaches that have played/managed in the football league or any foreign equivalent to this level (i.e. fully professional league).
2. Managers/Coaches with full international caps.
- (England) Nick Tanner
