= St George, Bristol =

District of Bristol, England

Coordinates: 51.4586°N 2.5385°W

St George
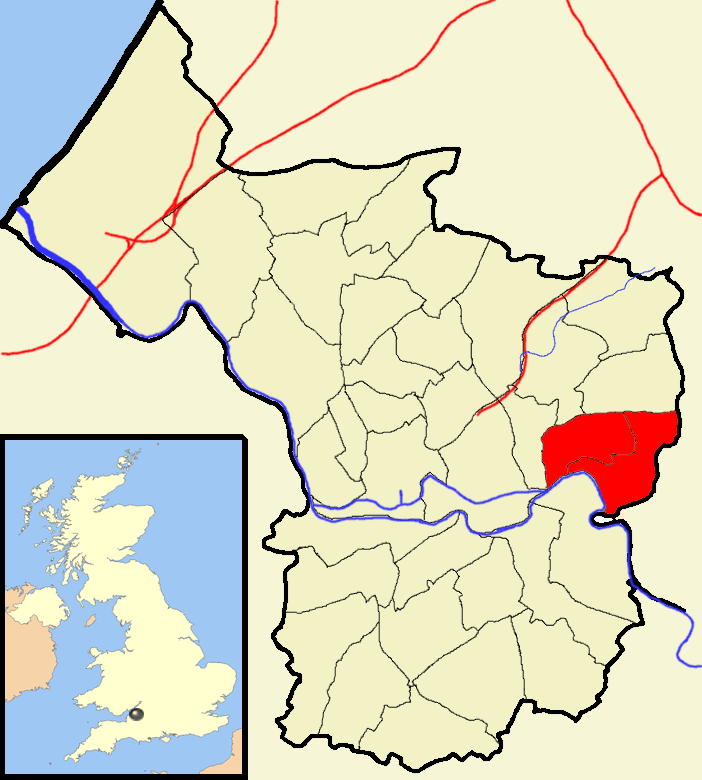
- Boundaries of St George West and East wards, shown within Bristol.
- Population: 11,348 (2001.Ward)(East); 10,929 (2001.Ward)(West)
- OS grid reference: ST626734
- Unitary authority: Bristol
- Ceremonial county: Bristol
- Region: South West
- Country: England
- Sovereign state: United Kingdom
- Post town: BRISTOL
- Postcode district: BS5
- Dialling code: 0117
- Police: Avon and Somerset
- Fire: Avon
- Ambulance: South Western
- UK Parliament: Bristol East

St George is a district of Bristol, England on the eastern edge of the city boundary.

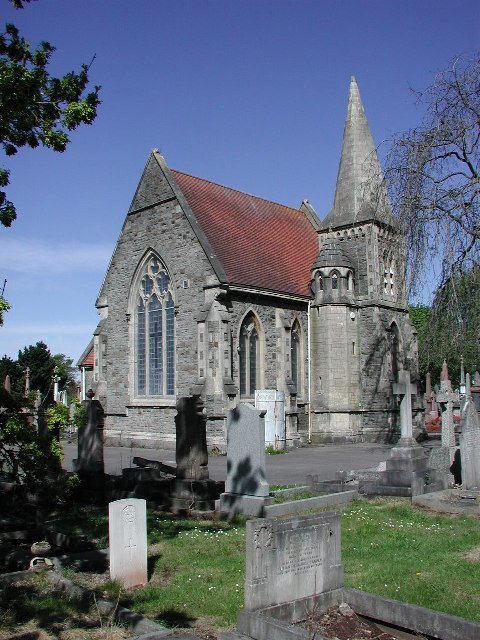
Avonview Cemetery Chapel

St George was originally in Gloucestershire, outside the city boundary, and the terminus of the tram line from Bristol was in Beaconsfield Road. It became a civil parish as Bristol St George in 1866, and briefly an urban district from 1894 to 1898. On 1 April 1898 the parish was abolished and merged with Bristol. In 1891 the parish had a population of 36,718.

Troopers Hill chimney is a local landmark. St George was a mining area from the early 19th century (coal and fireclay) until 1904 when the last fireclay mines were abandoned. Troopers Hill was declared as a Local Nature Reserve (LNR) on 22 June 1995.

John Armitstead, a colliery proprietor, had a pit between Church Road and Whitehall Road, where he installed a pumping engine for raising coal. Power was generated from water by means of a fire and the device was called a fire engine. It stood on land which came to be known as the Engine Ground; this is reflected in the name of a local public house, the Fire Engine.

The St George Fountain is a Victorian water fountain on the main Church Road which forks at this point to become Clouds Hill Road to Kingswood and Summerhill Road to Hanham.

St George, along with other east Bristol suburbs such as Hanham, Kingswood and Brislington, is currently unserved by rail. The nearest stations are Lawrence Hill and Stapleton Road.
