= Bristol derby =

English football rivalry

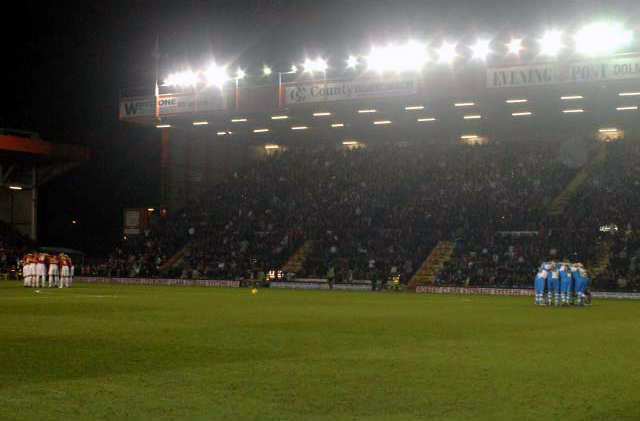
- The two teams moments before kick-off of the 2007 goalless draw at Ashton Gate
- Location: Bristol, England
- Teams: Bristol City; Bristol Rovers
- First meeting: Eastville Rovers 4–0 Bristol South End 1895–96 Gloucestershire Senior Challenge Cup (25 January 1896)
- Latest meeting: Bristol City 2–1 Bristol Rovers 2013–14 Football League Trophy (4 September 2013)
- Stadiums: Ashton Gate; Memorial Stadium; Twerton Park; Eastville Stadium; St John's Lane

Statistics
- Total meetings: 232
- Most wins: Bristol City (105)
- All-time record: Bristol City: 105; Drawn: 62; Bristol Rovers: 65
- Largest victory: Bristol Rovers 0–5 Bristol City (on three occasions) 1925–26 Third Division South (9 October 1926), 1944–45 Gloucestershire Cup (26 December 1944), 1968–69 Gloucestershire Cup (28 April 1969)
- Largest goal scoring: Bristol Rovers 4–4 Bristol City 1939–40 South-West League (9 March 1940) Bristol City 5–3 Bristol Rovers 1956–57 Second Division (22 September 1956)
- Longest unbeaten streak: Bristol City (10) (1975–1981)

Map
- Map showing the locations of the two teams within Bristol.

The Bristol derby is the name given to football matches played between Bristol City and Bristol Rovers (a "local derby"). The fans of each club consider the other to be their main rivals, leading to a heated atmosphere at these matches. The majority of the meetings between the teams have been in the Football League, and they used to meet annually in the Gloucestershire Cup.

The Bristol derby was deemed 8th fiercest rivalry in English football in an in-depth report by the Football Pools in 2008.

== History ==
The first meeting of what would become a fierce rivalry took place on 22 September 1894, when newly formed Bristol South End (later to be renamed Bristol City) hosted a friendly match with Eastville Rovers (later Bristol Rovers) at their ground at St John's Lane in Bedminster, in which Bristol South End (nicknamed the Southerners at the time), perhaps surprisingly, defeated their more established opponents 2–1. After a further number of friendly matches, the teams had their first competitive meeting when they were drawn together in the 1895–96 Gloucestershire Cup. This time Rovers, who had the home advantage at their Ridgeway ground, were the victors with an emphatic 4–0 defeat of South End, in what was reported to have been a very physical encounter:

It was a regular cup tie, and was characterised by very rough play, and an inclination on the part of a number of players to "have a few words" with their opponents–in fact on two or three occasions the referee had to remind the offenders that it was not a boxing contest.

— Bristol Mercury, 27 January 1896.

The following season the teams met in league competition for the first time when South End joined the Western League, winning 2–0 away to Rovers on 26 September 1896. In 1897 South End renamed themselves Bristol City and played in both the Southern League and the now-professional Western League, but opted to leave the Western League a year later. Rovers meanwhile split their seasons between the Birmingham & District League and Western League, not joining the Southern League until 1899, meaning there were no league matches played between the clubs during the 1898–99 season.

In the summer of 1900, City merged with local rivals Bedminster F.C., with the new club retaining the name and identity of the original Bristol City. Rovers and City spent just two seasons together in the Southern League before City successfully applied for election to The Football League in 1901, leading to a 21-year gap before they would play in the same division again.

Games between the two teams, like the majority of local derbies in English football, have resulted in a number of football hooliganism incidents. In a match between the clubs in December 1996, pitch invasions by both sets of fans culminated in reports of Rovers players being "assaulted" by City fans. Some fans of both teams have even been known to avoid attending derby matches because of fears of violence.

The most recent match between the two sides came on 4 September 2013 in the Johnstone's Paint Trophy first round at City's Ashton Gate Stadium. The game finished 2–1 to City. The match, which was broadcast live on Sky Sports, was overshadowed by a post match pitch invasion by a number of Bristol City supporters, leading to 60 arrests being made and three police officers injured.

== All-time results ==
Comparative chart of yearly table positions of City and Rovers in the Football League

The table below shows the results of all competitive matches between Bristol City and Bristol Rovers. The teams have faced each other in The Football League, FA Cup, Football League Cup, Football League Trophy (formerly known as the Associate Members' Cup), Gloucestershire Cup, Third Division South Cup, Southern Football League and Western Football League, as well as in a number of wartime competitions held while normal League football was suspended.

As of game played on 4 September 2013. All Football League, FA Cup, League Cup and Football League Trophy results, and attendance figures since 2003 from 11v11.com. Other results and pre-2003 attendance figures from Byrne & Jay (2003). Friendly matches are not included in this table.

Season	Date	Competition	Home team	Score	Away team	Attendance
2013–14	4 September 2013	Football League Trophy	City	2–1	Rovers	17,888
2006–07	27 February 2007	Football League Trophy	Rovers	1–0	City	11,530
2006–07	21 February 2007	Football League Trophy	City	0–0	Rovers	18,730
2001–02	9 January 2002	Football League Trophy	City	3–0	Rovers	17,367
2000–01	3 April 2001	Second Division	Rovers	1–1	City	9,361
2000–01	22 December 2000	Second Division	City	3–2	Rovers	16,696
1999–2000	22 April 2000	Second Division	Rovers	2–0	City	10,805
1999–2000	17 October 1999	Second Division	City	0–0	Rovers	16,011
1997–98	14 March 1998	Second Division	City	2–0	Rovers	17,086
1997–98	4 November 1997	Second Division	Rovers	1–2	City	7,552
1997–98	26 August 1997	League Cup	Rovers	1–2	City	5,872
1997–98	12 August 1997	League Cup	City	0–0	Rovers	9,341
1996–97	16 March 1997	Second Division	Rovers	1–2	City	8,078
1996–97	15 December 1996	Second Division	City	1–1	Rovers	18,674
1996–97	17 August 1996	Gloucestershire Cup	City	1–0	Rovers	4,932
1995–96	16 March 1996	Second Division	Rovers	2–4	City	8,648
1995–96	16 January 1996	Second Division	City	0–2	Rovers	20,007
1994–95	3 August 1994	Gloucestershire Cup	Rovers^{a}	0–0	City	3,699
1993–94	5 August 1993	Gloucestershire Cup	City	1–1	Rovers^{b}	6,698
1992–93	6 April 1993	First Division	City	2–1	Rovers	21,854
1992–93	13 December 1992	First Division	Rovers	4–0	City	7,106
1992–93	5 August 1992	Gloucestershire Cup	Rovers	2–1	City	3,722
1991–92	21 December 1991	Second Division	Rovers	3–2	City	6,306
1991–92	8 October 1991	League Cup	City	2–4	Rovers	9,880
1991–92	25 September 1991	League Cup	Rovers	1–3	City	5,155
1991–92	4 September 1991	Second Division	City	1–0	Rovers	20,183
1991–92	17 August 1991	Gloucestershire Cup	City	3–2	Rovers	6,796
1990–91	5 March 1991	Second Division	City	1–0	Rovers	22,227
1990–91	26 January 1991	Second Division	Rovers	3–2	City	7,054
1990–91	15 August 1990	Gloucestershire Cup	Rovers	1–4	City	4,208
1989–90	2 May 1990	Third Division	Rovers	3–0	City	9,831
1989–90	23 September 1989	Third Division	City	0–0	Rovers	17,432
1989–90	8 August 1989	Gloucestershire Cup	City	1–2	Rovers	6,153
1988–89	25 March 1989	Third Division	Rovers	1–1	City	8,676
1988–89	2 January 1989	Third Division	City	0–1	Rovers	23,191
1988–89	23 November 1988	Associate Members' Cup	Rovers	1–0	City	3,940
1988–89	17 August 1988	Gloucestershire Cup	Rovers	3–0	City	1,664
1987–88	12 April 1988	Third Division	Rovers	1–0	City	5,947
1987–88	15 March 1988	Gloucestershire Cup	City	3–1	Rovers	2,278
1987–88	2 December 1987	Gloucestershire Cup	Rovers	1–2	City	1,376
1987–88	12 September 1987	Third Division	City	3–3	Rovers	14,746
1986–87	18 April 1987	Third Division	Rovers	0–0	City	4,695
1986–87	1 January 1987	Third Division	City	0–1	Rovers	17,122
1986–87	16 December 1986	Associate Members' Cup	City	3–0	Rovers	6,903
1985–86	22 April 1986	Third Division	Rovers	1–1	City	9,926
1985–86	29 March 1986	Third Division	City	2–0	Rovers	12,171
1985–86	9 September 1985	Gloucestershire Cup	City	1–0	Rovers	4,894
1984–85	21 May 1985	Gloucestershire Cup	Rovers	3–1	City	4,033
1984–85	13 April 1985	Third Division	Rovers	1–0	City	12,957
1984–85	8 December 1984	FA Cup 2nd round	City	1–3	Rovers	19,367
1984–85	10 November 1984	Third Division	City	3–0	Rovers	18,672
1983–84	10 December 1983	FA Cup 2nd round	Rovers	1–2	City	14,396
1983–84	20 September 1983	Gloucestershire Cup	City	2–3	Rovers	6,538
1982–83	21 September 1982	Gloucestershire Cup	Rovers	2–1	City	4,369
1981–82	12 April 1982	Third Division	City	1–2	Rovers	10,791
1981–82	29 December 1981	Third Division	Rovers	1–0	City	12,355
1981–82	8 September 1981	Gloucestershire Cup	City	0–1	Rovers	4,022
1980–81	5 May 1981	Gloucestershire Cup	Rovers	0–1	City	2,558
1980–81	31 January 1981	Second Division	Rovers	0–0	City	10,087
1980–81	23 August 1980	Second Division	City	0–0	Rovers	16,937
1979–80	6 May 1980	Gloucestershire Cup	City	1–0	Rovers	5,584
1978–79	15 May 1979	Gloucestershire Cup	Rovers	0–2	City	6,661
1977–78	2 May 1978	Gloucestershire Cup	City	3–0	Rovers	10,178
1976–77	24 May 1977	Gloucestershire Cup	Rovers	0–1	City	10,432
1975–76	4 May 1976	Gloucestershire Cup	City	3–2	Rovers	10,278
1975–76	16 April 1976	Second Division	Rovers	0–0	City	26,430
1975–76	30 August 1975	Second Division	City	1–1	Rovers	17,918
1974–75	29 April 1975	Gloucestershire Cup	Rovers	2–1	City	11,408
1974–75	1 April 1975	Second Division	City	1–1	Rovers	28,953
1974–75	28 December 1974	Second Division	Rovers	1–4	City	20,933
1973–74	29 April 1974	Gloucestershire Cup	City	0–2	Rovers	15,986
1972–73	1 May 1973	Gloucestershire Cup	Rovers	2–2	City^{c}	12,350
1971–72	9 May 1972	Gloucestershire Cup	City	1–1	Rovers	13,137
1970–71	4 May 1971	Gloucestershire Cup	Rovers	1–1	City	12,256
1969–70	22 April 1970	Gloucestershire Cup	City	2–1	Rovers	12,004
1968–69	28 April 1969	Gloucestershire Cup	Rovers	0–5	City	14,735
1967–68	14 May 1968	Gloucestershire Cup	City	1–1	Rovers	11,375
1967–68	30 January 1968	FA Cup 3rd round	Rovers	1–2	City	30,157
1967–68	27 January 1968	FA Cup 3rd round	City	0–0	Rovers	37,237
1966–67	9 May 1967	Gloucestershire Cup	Rovers	0–3	City	17,433
1965–66	12 May 1966	Gloucestershire Cup	City	0–1	Rovers	9,431
1964–65	26 April 1965	Gloucestershire Cup	Rovers	3–2	City	8,907
1964–65	13 February 1965	Third Division	City	2–1	Rovers	23,052
1964–65	3 October 1964	Third Division	Rovers	1–1	City	25,372
1963–64	28 April 1964	Gloucestershire Cup	City	2–2	Rovers	7,693
1963–64	14 December 1963	Third Division	Rovers	4–0	City	19,451
1963–64	24 August 1963	Third Division	City	3–0	Rovers	20,697
1962–63	23 May 1963	Gloucestershire Cup	Rovers	2–1	City	8,018
1962–63	23 April 1963	Third Division	City	4–1	Rovers	22,739
1962–63	15 September 1962	Third Division	Rovers	1–2	City	20,708
1961–62	1 May 1962	Gloucestershire Cup	City	3–1	Rovers	9,201
1960–61	1 May 1961	Gloucestershire Cup	Rovers	1–3	City	12,109
1959–60	2 May 1960	Gloucestershire Cup	City	3–2	Rovers	7,195
1959–60	27 February 1960	Second Division	Rovers	2–1	City	27,048
1959–60	10 October 1959	Second Division	City	2–1	Rovers	27,548
1958–59	4 May 1959	Gloucestershire Cup	Rovers	1–1	City	11,022
1958–59	21 March 1959	Second Division	City	1–1	Rovers	26,868
1958–59	1 November 1958	Second Division	Rovers	1–2	City	32,104
1957–58	29 April 1958	Gloucestershire Cup	City	4–1	Rovers	10,590
1957–58	5 April 1958	Second Division	Rovers	3–3	City	24,782
1957–58	15 February 1958	FA Cup 5th round	City	3–4	Rovers	39,126
1957–58	12 October 1957	Second Division	City	3–2	Rovers	33,465
1956–57	29 April 1957	Gloucestershire Cup	Rovers	1–2	City	14,608
1956–57	2 February 1957	Second Division	Rovers	0–0	City	32,055
1956–57	22 September 1956	Second Division	City	5–3	Rovers	36,951
1955–56	30 April 1956	Gloucestershire Cup	City	0–1	Rovers	11,952
1955–56	3 March 1956	Second Division	Rovers	0–3	City	35,324
1955–56	22 October 1955	Second Division	City	1–1	Rovers	39,583
1954–55	2 May 1955	Gloucestershire Cup	Rovers	2–1	City	20,097
1953–54	3 May 1954	Gloucestershire Cup	City	2–2	Rovers	13,668
1952–53	8 May 1953	Gloucestershire Cup	Rovers	0–2	City	19,214
1952–53	7 February 1953	Third Division (South)	City	0–0	Rovers	35,372
1952–53	20 September 1952	Third Division (South)	Rovers	0–0	City	29,880
1951–52	10 May 1952	Gloucestershire Cup	City	2–1	Rovers	16,214
1951–52	19 January 1952	Third Division (South)	Rovers	2–0	City	34,612
1951–52	15 September 1951	Third Division (South)	City	1–1	Rovers	29,782
1950–51	12 May 1951	Gloucestershire Cup	Rovers	1–1	City	16,673
1950–51	30 December 1950	Third Division (South)	Rovers	2–1	City	31,518
1950–51	2 September 1950	Third Division (South)	City	1–0	Rovers	28,168
1949–50	13 May 1950	Gloucestershire Cup	City	2–0	Rovers	16,560
1949–50	14 January 1950	Third Division (South)	City	1–2	Rovers	33,697
1949–50	10 September 1949	Third Division (South)	Rovers	2–3	City	34,463
1948–49	14 May 1949	Gloucestershire Cup	Rovers	2–0	City	15,111
1948–49	5 February 1949	Third Division (South)	City	1–1	Rovers	27,006
1948–49	18 September 1948	Third Division (South)	Rovers	3–1	City	29,740
1947–48	8 May 1948	Gloucestershire Cup	City	1–2	Rovers	16,000
1947–48	14 February 1948	Third Division (South)	City	5–2	Rovers	25,908
1947–48	27 September 1947	Third Division (South)	Rovers	0–2	City	34,188
1946–47	7 June 1947	Gloucestershire Cup	City	2–0	Rovers	11,434
1946–47	26 May 1947	Gloucestershire Cup	Rovers	2–2	City	17,151
1946–47	1 February 1947	Third Division (South)	City	4–0	Rovers	17,119
1946–47	28 September 1946	Third Division (South)	Rovers	0–3	City	25,900
1945–46	30 March 1946	Third Division South (South) Cup	City	1–2	Rovers	18,099
1945–46	23 March 1946	Third Division South (South) Cup	Rovers	0–0	City	25,598
1945–46	15 December 1945	FA Cup 2nd round	Rovers	0–2	City	21,045
1945–46	8 December 1945	FA Cup 2nd round	City	4–2	Rovers	19,295
1945–46	24 September 1945	Gloucestershire Cup	City	3–1	Rovers	7,962
1945–46	1 September 1945	Third Division South (South)	City	3–0	Rovers	10,583
1945–46	25 August 1945	Third Division South (South)	Rovers	0–3	City	14,906
1944–45		Gloucestershire Cup	Rovers	0–5	City	9,048
World War II (1939–1945)
1939–40	6 April 1940	South-West League	City	0–1	Rovers	3,358
1939–40	9 March 1940	South-West League	Rovers	4–4	City	2,153
1939–40	30 December 1939	South-West League	Rovers^{d}	4–2	City	1,966
1939–40	11 November 1939	South-West League	City	0–3	Rovers	2,817
1939–40	19 August 1939	Football League Jubilee Match	Rovers	4–0	City	5,395
1938–39	25 February 1939	Third Division (South)	Rovers	1–1	City	14,824
1938–39	22 October 1938	Third Division (South)	City	2–1	Rovers	15,825
1938–39	21 September 1938	Gloucestershire Cup	City	3–0	Rovers	2,465
1937–38	30 April 1938	Third Division (South)	City	0–0	Rovers	23,424
1937–38	28 December 1937	Third Division (South)	Rovers	1–0	City	25,000
1937–38	27 September 1937	Gloucestershire Cup	Rovers	2–1	City	3,648
1936–37	2 January 1937	Third Division (South)	City	4–1	Rovers	13,030
1936–37	13 September 1936	Gloucestershire Cup	City	1–0	Rovers	5,100
1936–37	5 September 1936	Third Division (South)	Rovers	3–1	City	25,638
1935–36	4 January 1936	Third Division (South)	Rovers	1–1	City	18,459
1935–36	2 October 1935	Third Division (South) Cup	City	4–2	Rovers	2,000
1935–36	25 September 1935	Gloucestershire Cup	Rovers	3–1	City	6,293
1935–36	7 September 1935	Third Division (South)	City	0–2	Rovers	23,991
1934–35	6 February 1935	Third Division (South)	City	1–1	Rovers	7,911
1934–35	26 September 1934	Gloucestershire Cup	City	1–2	Rovers	5,216
1934–35	15 September 1934	Third Division (South)	Rovers	2–2	City	25,000
1933–34	3 April 1934	Gloucestershire Cup	City	2–1	Rovers	6,278
1933–34	30 December 1933	Third Division (South)	Rovers	5–1	City	23,907
1933–34	13 September 1933	Gloucestershire Cup	Rovers	0–0	City	8,361
1933–34	26 August 1933	Third Division (South)	City	0–3	Rovers	25,521
1932–33	24 April 1933	Gloucestershire Cup	Rovers	3–4	City	5,809
1932–33	29 March 1933	Third Division (South)	Rovers	1–1	City	23,475
1932–33	15 October 1932	Third Division (South)	City	3–1	Rovers	25,501
1932–33	14 September 1932	Gloucestershire Cup	City	3–3	Rovers	6,929
1931–32	9 September 1931	Gloucestershire Cup	Rovers	0–1	City	10,862
1930–31	1 October 1930	Gloucestershire Cup	City	3–1	Rovers	5,026
1929–30	22 April 1930	Gloucestershire Cup	City	4–1	Rovers	3,500
1929–30	30 September 1929	Gloucestershire Cup	Rovers	0–0	City	3,000
1928–29	19 September 1928	Gloucestershire Cup	City	2–0	Rovers	6,923
1927–28	10 April 1928	Gloucestershire Cup	Rovers	1–0	City	7,600
1926–27	26 February 1927	Third Division (South)	City	3–1	Rovers	28,696
1926–27	1 January 1927	Gloucestershire Cup	City	4–0	Rovers	9,601
1926–27	9 October 1926	Third Division (South)	Rovers	0–5	City	28,731
1925–26	19 April 1926	Gloucestershire Cup	Rovers	1–4	City	4,500
1925–26	20 March 1926	Third Division (South)	Rovers	0–1	City	28,500
1925–26	7 November 1925	Third Division (South)	City	0–0	Rovers	18,816
1924–25	29 April 1925	Gloucestershire Cup	Rovers	2–0	City	4,123
1924–25	27 April 1925	Gloucestershire Cup	City	1–1	Rovers	5,102
1924–25	28 February 1925	Third Division (South)	City	2–0	Rovers	15,000
1924–25	10 January 1925	FA Cup 1st round	Rovers	0–1	City	31,500
1924–25	25 October 1924	Third Division (South)	Rovers	0–0	City	30,000
1923–24	5 May 1924	Gloucestershire Cup	City	2–0	Rovers	6,091
1923–24	30 April 1924	Gloucestershire Cup	Rovers	1–1	City	7,396
1922–23	7 May 1923	Gloucestershire Cup	City	1–0	Rovers	4,991
1922–23	30 September 1922	Third Division (South)	Rovers	1–2	City	30,000
1922–23	23 September 1922	Third Division (South)	City	0–1	Rovers	30,000
1921–22	1 May 1922	Gloucestershire Cup	Rovers	0–0	City	4,991
1920–21	29 September 1920	Gloucestershire Cup	City	1–0	Rovers	11,994
1919–20	24 September 1919	Gloucestershire Cup	Rovers	0–4	City	7,000
1918–19	21 April 1919	Bristol County Combination	Rovers	1–1	City	11,053
1918–19	26 December 1918	Bristol County Combination	City	2–3	Rovers	3,000
1917–18	9 March 1918	Bristol County Combination	City	1–0	Rovers	
1917–18	9 February 1918	Bristol County Combination	Rovers	2–0	City	
World War I (1914–1918)
1913–14	14 April 1914	Gloucestershire Cup	City	2–0	Rovers	8,501
1912–13	25 March 1913	Gloucestershire Cup	Rovers	1–0	City	9,590
1911–12	3 February 1912	Gloucestershire Cup	City	1–0	Rovers	8,966
1910–11	19 April 1911	Gloucestershire Cup	Rovers	0–1	City	4,466
1909–10	6 April 1910	Gloucestershire Cup	City	2–0	Rovers	1,000
1909–10	26 January 1910	Gloucestershire Cup	Rovers	1–2	City	1,175
1909–10	13 October 1909	Gloucestershire Cup	City	1–1	Rovers	3,000
1909–10	1 September 1909	Gloucestershire Cup	Rovers	1–1	City	9,521
1907–08	29 April 1908	Gloucestershire Cup	City	2–0	Rovers	8,186
1906–07	1 April 1907	Gloucestershire Cup	Rovers	0–2	City	12,629
1905–06	16 April 1906	Gloucestershire Cup	City	4–0	Rovers	8,836
1904–05	28 April 1905	Gloucestershire Cup	City	1–3	Rovers	3,916
1904–05	24 April 1905	Gloucestershire Cup	Rovers	2–2	City	10,510
1903–04	4 April 1904	Gloucestershire Cup	City	2–1	Rovers	10,537
1902–03	29 April 1903	Gloucestershire Cup	City	2–4	Rovers	4,985
1902–03	20 April 1903	Gloucestershire Cup	City	1–1	Rovers	4,044
1902–03	13 April 1903	Gloucestershire Cup	Rovers	0–0	City	11,790
1901–02	23 April 1902	Gloucestershire Cup	City	0–0	Rovers	4,223
1901–02	31 March 1902	Gloucestershire Cup	Rovers	0–0	City	14,000
1901–02	27 November 1901	FA Cup 4th qualifying round	City	2–3	Rovers	5,000
1900–01	29 April 1901	Gloucestershire Cup	City	4–0	Rovers	2,800
1900–01	8 April 1901	Southern League Division One	Rovers	1–1	City	10,000
1900–01	20 October 1900	Southern League Division One	City	1–0	Rovers	15,500
1899–1900	13 April 1900	Southern League Division One	Rovers	1–0	City	10,000
1899–1900	9 April 1900	Gloucestershire Cup	City	0–1	Rovers	2,000
1899–1900	2 April 1900	Gloucestershire Cup	Rovers	1–1	City	3,000
1899–1900	26 December 1899	Southern League Division One	City	1–0	Rovers	3,000
1898–99	3 April 1899	Gloucestershire Cup^{e}	City	2–1	Rovers	11,433
1897–98	16 March 1898	Western League Professional Section	Rovers	2–3	City	4,000
1897–98	26 February 1898	Gloucestershire Cup	City	2–0	Rovers	6,400
1897–98	13 October 1897	Western League Professional Section	City	4–0	Rovers	3,000
1896–97	9 January 1897	Western League Division One	South End	1–3	Rovers	
1896–97	26 September 1897	Western League Division One	Rovers	0–2	South End	3,000
1895–96	25 January 1896	Gloucestershire Cup	Rovers	4–0	South End	2,000

^a Rovers won the 1994 Gloucestershire Cup 11–10 on penalties. Score was 0–0 after extra time.
^b Rovers won the 1993 Gloucestershire Cup 5–3 on penalties. Score was 0–0 after 90 minutes; 1–1 after extra time.
^c City won the 1972–73 Gloucestershire Cup on penalties.
^d Although Rovers were officially the home team for the wartime South-West League game played on 30 December 1939, the match was played at Ashton Gate.
^e The final of the 1898–99 Gloucestershire Cup was held at a neutral venue, at the home of Bristol St George.

=== Results ===
Competition	Played	City wins	Draws	Rovers wins
Football League	88	34	30	24
Southern League	4	2	1	1
Western League	4	3	0	1
Total league	96	39	31	26
FA Cup	9	5	1	3
League Cup	4	2	1	1
Football League Trophy	6	3	1	2
Third Division (South) Cup	1	1	0	0
Gloucestershire Cup	103	52	25	26
Total Cups	123	63	28	32
Wartime competitions	12	3	3	6
Other games	1	0	0	1
Total	232	105	62	65

=== Matches between Rovers and Bedminster ===
This table shows all competitive meetings between Bristol Rovers (who also played under the names Bristol Eastville Rovers and Eastville Rovers) and Bedminster, covering the period from the beginning of league football in Bristol in 1892 until Bedminster's merger into Bristol City in 1900.

Season	Date	Competition	Home team	Score	Away team	Attendance
1899–1900	20 January 1900	Southern League Division One	Bedminster	5–2	Rovers	1,000
1899–1900	23 September 1899	Southern League Division One	Rovers	0–3	Bedminster	8,000
1898–99	12 April 1899	Gloucestershire Cup	Rovers	1–0	Bedminster	3,000
1898–99	28 January 1899	Western League Professional Section	Rovers	2–2	Bedminster	2,000
1898–99	24 December 1898	Western League Professional Section	Bedminster	1–0	Rovers	6,000
1897–98	16 October 1897	FA Cup 2nd qualifying round	Rovers	4–2	Bedminster	1,000
1896–97	10 April 1897	Bristol Charity Cup	Rovers	0–2	Bedminster	
1896–97	2 January 1897	Western League Division One	Bedminster	1–2	Rovers	
1896–97	19 September 1896	Western League Division One	Rovers	0–1	Bedminster	
1895–96	28 March 1896	Gloucestershire Cup	Bedminster	0–1	Rovers	4,000
1895–96	8 February 1896	Western League Division One	Rovers	1–2	Bedminster	
1895–96	26 October 1895	Western League Division One	Bedminster	1–3	Rovers	900
1894–95	20 April 1895	Bristol & District League Division One	Bedminster	1–4	Rovers	
1894–95	15 December 1894	Bristol & District League Division One	Rovers	4–2	Bedminster	600
1893–94	3 March 1894	Bristol & District League Division One	Rovers	3–3	Bedminster	
1893–94	7 October 1893	Bristol & District League Division One	Bedminster	2–0	Rovers	
1892–93	25 March 1893	Bristol & District League Division One	Rovers	5–2	Bedminster	
1892–93	3 December 1892	Bristol & District League Division One	Bedminster	5–0	Rovers	1,000

== Crossing the divide ==
=== Players for both sides ===
A large number of players have played for both City and Rovers since the clubs were formed in the 19th century. The most recent player to move directly between the two clubs was Matty Taylor who joined City from Rovers on 31 January 2017. A list of the most significant players to represent both sides of the city is shown below. To be included in this list a player must have made at least 50 appearances in the Football League for both clubs.

Name	Nation	Bristol City			Bristol Rovers		
Name	Nation	Years	Apps	Gls	Years	Apps	Gls
Peter Hooper	Kenya †	1963–1966	54	14	1953–1962	297	101
Trevor Jacobs	England	1965–1972	131	3	1973–1976	82	3
Ray Cashley	England	1970–1981	227	1	1982–1985	53	0
Donnie Gillies	Scotland	1973–1980	200	26	1980–1982	59	0
Terry Cooper	England †	1978–1980; 1982–1984	71	1	1980–1981	50	0
Brian Williams	England	1985–1987	77	3	1981–1985	172	21
Trevor Morgan	England	1984; 1987	51	15	1985–1987	55	24
Peter Beadle	England	1999–2003	82	14	1995–1998	109	39
Steve Phillips	England	1997–2006	257	0	2006–2010	136	0
Danny Coles	England	1999–2005	148	6	2007–2011	102	3
David Clarkson	Scotland †	2009–2012	63	11	2012–2014	60	12
Matty Taylor	England	2017-2020	75	9	2014-2017	134	68
Chris Martin	Scotland †	2020–2023	88	15	2023–2025	57	21

† = Players who are capped at full international level.

=== Managers for both sides ===
Four managers have taken charge of both sides in a Bristol Derby: Joe Palmer, Fred Ford, Terry Cooper and John Ward. Palmer and Ford both managed City first, then later went to Rovers, while Cooper moved in the opposite direction. Ward had two spells as Rovers manager, which were either side of his time at City.

The table below shows the record of each of these managers in Bristol Derbies.

Name	Nation	as Bristol City manager					as Bristol Rovers manager					Total			
Name	Nation	Dates	P	W	D	L	Dates	P	W	D	L	P	W	D	L
Joe Palmer	England	1919–1921	2	2	0	0	1926–1929	5	1	0	4	7	3	0	4
Fred Ford	England	1960–1967	13	7	2	4	1968–1969	2	0	1	1	15	7	3	5
Terry Cooper	England	1982–1988	16	7	3	6	1980–1981	5	1	2	2	21	8	5	8
John Ward	England	1997–1998	4	3	1	0	1993–1996; 2012–2014	5; 1	1; 0	2; 0	2; 1	10	4	3	3

Note: Russell Osman also managed both teams, but didn't take part in any Bristol derbies while in charge of Rovers.
