= Bristol Rovers F.C. league record by opponent =

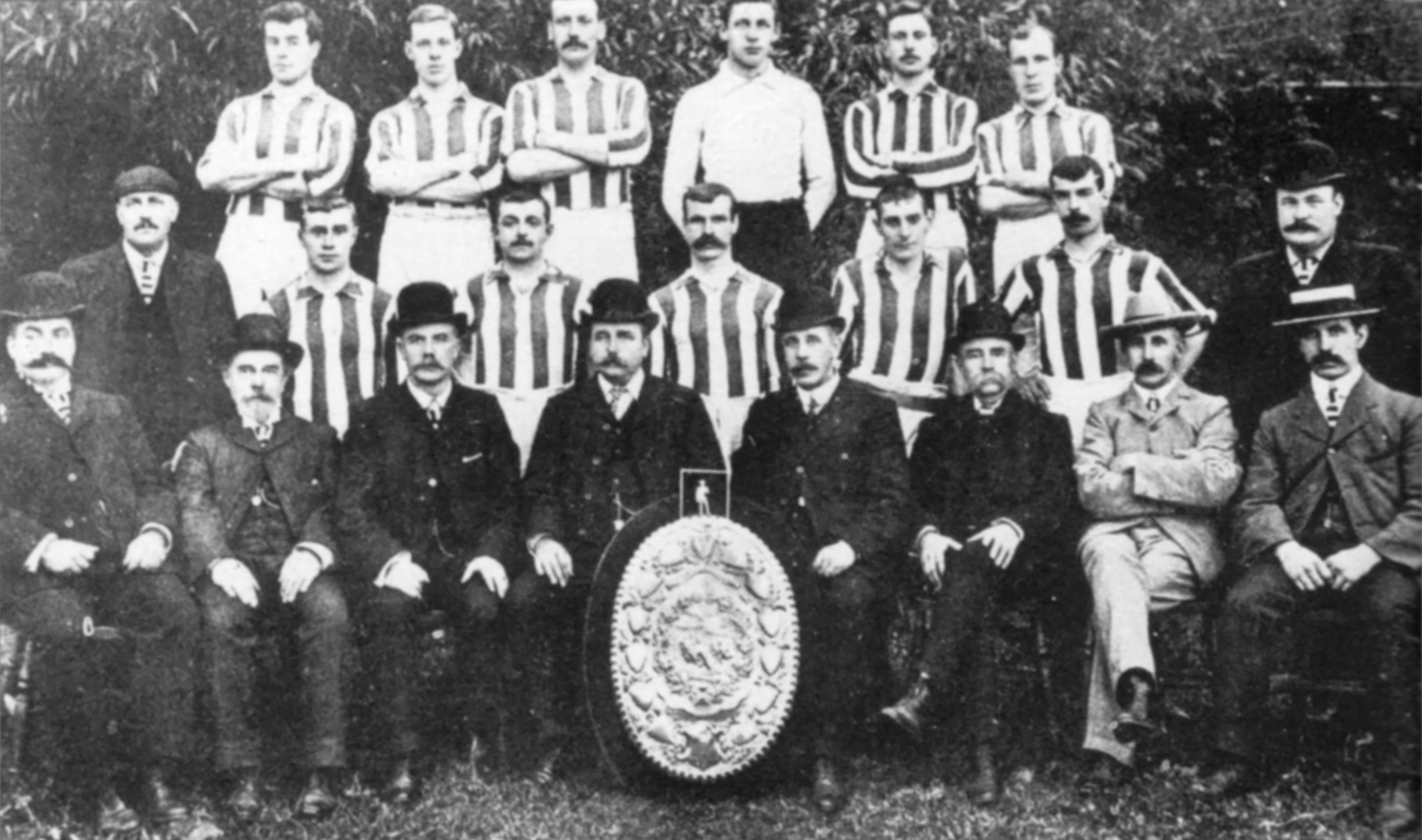
Bristol Rovers were winners of the 1904–05 Southern League, they are seen here with their championship trophy

Bristol Rovers are an association football club based in the city of Bristol in South West England, who currently play in EFL League Two. For the majority of the club's history the first team have played in the English Football League, but they have also spent time in the Western Football League and Southern Football League, as well as having very brief spells in the West Midlands (Regional) League and National League.

In 128–129 years of playing league football Bristol Rovers have faced many opponents, some of whom are still familiar names, while others were consigned to history many years ago. The table below lists every opponent faced by the club's first team in league competition, along with details of which league they played in at the time, their record against that team, and the dates of the first and most recent meetings with them.

== Club history ==
Bristol Rovers were founded in 1883 under the name Black Arabs Football Club, so-called because they shared a home field with the Arabs Rugby Club and they wore predominantly black jerseys. A year later, in 1884, the football club decided to forge their own identity and renamed themselves Eastville Rovers, after the Eastville area of Bristol where they had their headquarters. Throughout their early years they played only friendly matches (referred to at the time as test matches), and from the 1897–98 season they also participated in the Gloucestershire Senior Cup.

Eastville Rovers finally joined a formal league for the first time in 1892, when they were founder members of what was called at the time the Bristol & District League, but later became the Western Football League. The league rules initially stated that all players must be amateur, but growing pressure from the teams for the league to turn to professionalism led to the establishment of the Western League Professional Section in 1897. Only eight teams entered the professional division for the 1897–98 season though, so Rovers also entered the Birmingham & District League (now the West Midlands (Regional) League) and renamed themselves Bristol Eastville Rovers as they would now be facing teams from further afield. They continued to play in both leagues for two years until joining the Southern Football League (and renaming themselves again, this time to Bristol Rovers) in 1899, where they remained until joining the Football League in 1920. They stayed in the Football League for 94 years until relegation from League Two at the end of the 2013–14 season saw them play a single season in the Football Conference before being promoted back into the EFL at the first attempt, where they have remained ever since.

== All-time league record ==
League abbreviations in the main table
Code	League	Years	Notes
BD	Birmingham & District League	1897–1899	Now known as the West Midlands (Regional) League
FC	Football Conference	2014–2015	Now known as the National League
FL	English Football League	1920–2014; 2015–	
SL	Southern Football League	1899–1920	
WL	Western Football League	1892–1899	Initially known as the Bristol & District League

- † Teams with this background and symbol in the "Club" column are current divisional rivals of Bristol Rovers.
- ‡ Clubs with this background and symbol in the "Club" column are defunct.

Statistics are correct as of match played 21 November 2026.

Bristol Rovers F.C. league record by opponent
Club	League	Home				Away				Total						Win%	First	Last	Notes and refs
Club	League	P	W	D	L	P	W	D	L	P	W	D	L	F	A	Win%	First	Last	Notes and refs
Aberdare Athletic ‡	FL	6	5	0	1	6	1	1	4	12	6	1	5	16	12	50%	31 December 1921	9 April 1927	
Accrington Stanley †	FL	10	4	1	5	9	0	2	7	19	4	3	12	24	29	21.1%	23 December 2006	28 March 2026	
Aldershot ‡	FL	17	11	4	2	17	8	2	7	34	19	6	9	62	44	55.9%	26 December 1932	21 January 1989	
Aldershot Town	FL, FC	3	1	1	1	3	0	2	1	6	1	3	2	9	9	16.7%	17 September 2011	20 March 2015	
Alfreton Town	FC	1	1	0	0	1	0	1	0	2	1	1	0	7	0	50%	11 November 2014	25 April 2015	
Altrincham	FC	1	1	0	0	1	0	0	1	2	1	0	1	2	2	50%	16 August 2014	21 February 2015	
Aston Villa	FL	4	1	1	2	4	0	1	3	8	1	2	5	7	12	12.5%	5 September 1959	26 December 1974	
Aston Villa Reserves	BD	2	0	1	1	2	0	1	1	4	0	2	2	4	7	0%	2 October 1897	7 January 1899	
Barnet †	FL, FC	9	6	0	3	8	1	3	4	17	7	3	7	22	26	41.2%	2 October 1993	10 October 2026	
Barnsley	FL	18	8	8	2	18	5	3	10	36	13	11	12	51	50	36.1%	19 November 1955	18 January 2025	
Barrow	FL	5	5	0	0	5	1	2	2	10	6	2	2	14	10	60%	2 October 1967	10 March 2026	
Bedminster ‡	WL, SL	7	2	2	3	7	4	0	3	14	6	2	6	29	28	42.9%	3 December 1892	20 January 1900	
Berwick Rangers ‡	BD	2	1	1	0	2	1	0	1	4	2	1	1	8	5	50%	23 October 1897	22 April 1899	
Birmingham City	FL	7	1	5	1	7	0	3	4	14	1	8	5	14	20	7.1%	17 October 1953	1 April 2025	
Birmingham City Reserves	BD	2	1	0	1	2	1	0	1	4	2	0	2	12	10	50%	18 September 1897	11 March 1899	(Note: Birmingham City reserves were known as Small Heath Reserves when Rovers played them)
Blackburn Rovers	FL	16	9	3	4	16	5	4	7	32	14	7	11	47	37	43.8%	22 August 1953	14 April 2018	
Blackpool	FL	22	10	6	6	22	6	3	13	44	16	9	19	55	66	36.4%	28 September 1974	3 May 2025	
Bolton Wanderers	FL	18	8	4	6	18	3	6	9	36	11	10	15	38	51	30.6%	30 October 1971	5 April 2025	
Boston United	FL	5	3	2	0	5	0	2	3	10	3	4	3	12	11	30%	28 December 2002	10 March 2007	
AFC Bournemouth	FL	50	28	7	15	50	11	10	29	100	39	17	44	139	151	39%	29 December 1923	25 April 2011	
Bradford (Park Avenue) ‡	SL, FL	2	1	1	0	2	0	1	1	4	1	2	1	8	10	25%	25 December 1907	20 April 1963	
Bradford City	FL	15	12	3	0	15	4	6	5	30	16	9	5	61	41	53.3%	22 November 1969	2 April 2022	
Braintree Town	FC	1	1	0	0	1	0	0	1	2	1	0	1	3	2	50%	6 September 2014	24 February 2015	
Brentford	SL, FL	50	26	11	13	50	19	10	21	100	45	21	34	161	128	45%	15 February 1902	26 February 2011	
Brierley Hill Alliance ‡	BD	2	2	0	0	2	2	0	0	4	4	0	0	16	0	100%	8 January 1898	18 March 1899	
Brighton & Hove Albion	SL, FL	65	28	18	19	63	11	15	37	128	39	33	56	187	213	30.5%	12 September 1903	5 February 2011	(Note: Jay (1987) lists both Southern League meetings with Brighton & Hove Albion in the 1910–11 season as being played at home.)
Bristol City (Bristol derby)	WL, SL, FL	48	17	16	15	48	9	15	24	96	26	31	39	111	139	27.1%	26 September 1896	3 April 2001	(Note: Includes matches when Bristol City were known as Bristol South End)
Bristol St George	WL, BD	9	5	0	4	9	2	3	4	18	7	3	8	27	29	38.9%	26 December 1892	31 March 1899	(Note: Includes matches where Bristol St George were known as St George)
Bromley	FL	1	0	0	1	1	0	0	1	2	0	0	2	2	4	0%	26 December 2025	14 March 2026	
Burnley	FL	13	8	3	2	13	1	6	6	26	9	9	8	31	31	34.6%	20 November 1976	5 February 2000	
Burton Albion	FL	8	4	2	2	9	2	1	6	17	6	3	8	28	20	35.3%	22 October 2011	15 February 2025	
Bury	FL	24	15	5	4	24	4	7	13	48	19	12	17	66	68	39.6%	7 September 1953	30 March 2018	
Cambridge United	FL	19	13	4	2	19	8	4	7	38	21	8	9	55	44	55.3%	29 September 1973	14 February 2026	
Cardiff City	SL, FL	28	12	11	5	28	8	8	12	56	20	19	17	82	86	35.7%	1 September 1913	6 May 2000	
Carlisle United	FL	19	10	5	4	19	7	3	9	38	17	8	13	58	51	44.7%	29 September 1962	24 February 2024	
Charlton Athletic	FL	34	18	12	4	34	6	7	21	68	24	19	25	105	116	35.3%	10 September 1921	28 January 2025	
Chatham Town	SL	1	1	0	0	1	0	0	1	2	1	0	1	5	3	50%	23 December 1899	28 April 1900	
Chelsea	FL	4	3	0	1	4	0	1	3	8	3	1	4	7	8	41.2%	29 November 1975	14 March 1981	
Cheltenham Town †	FL	12	6	2	4	13	6	4	3	25	12	6	7	38	23	48%	6 November 2001	21 November 2026	
Chester	FC	1	1	0	0	1	0	1	0	2	1	1	0	7	3	50%	22 November 2014	3 April 2015	
Chester City ‡	FL	9	6	3	0	9	2	4	3	18	8	7	3	31	22	44.4%	29 August 1981	20 January 2007	
Chesterfield †	FL	20	14	4	2	19	5	5	9	39	19	9	11	52	41	48.7%	3 October 1970	14 November 2026	
Clevedon Town	WL	3	1	0	2	3	1	0	2	6	2	0	4	12	11	33.3%	26 November 1892	5 January 1895	(Note: Clevedon Town were known as Clevedon when they played against Rovers)
Clifton ‡	WL	5	2	0	3	5	3	1	1	10	5	1	4	17	19	50%	24 December 1892	24 April 1897	
Colchester United †	FL	17	10	5	2	16	4	4	8	33	14	9	10	54	36	42.4%	26 August 1950	1 September 2026	
Coventry City	BD, SL, FL	30	17	5	8	30	9	8	13	60	26	13	21	108	102	43.3%	4 September 1897	1 February 2020	(Note: Includes matches where Coventry City played under their previous name of Singers)
Crawley Town †	FL	5	3	2	0	6	2	0	4	11	5	2	4	13	13	45.5%	3 September 2011	29 August 2026	
Crewe Alexandra †	FL	11	3	4	4	12	1	3	8	23	4	7	12	24	42	17.4%	19 October 1963	3 October 2026	
Croydon Common ‡	SL	2	1	1	0	2	1	1	0	4	2	2	0	7	2	50%	7 March 1910	6 April 1915	
Crystal Palace	SL, FL	36	16	12	8	36	5	4	27	72	21	16	35	97	124	29.2%	3 November 1906	14 April 1979	
Dagenham & Redbridge	FL	5	2	0	3	5	3	0	2	10	5	0	5	15	14	50%	18 September 2010	7 May 2016	
Darlington	FL	9	6	1	2	9	3	4	2	18	9	5	4	30	19	50%	4 October 1966	6 February 2007	
Dartford	FC	1	1	0	0	1	0	1	0	2	1	1	0	3	2	50%	7 October 2014	31 January 2015	
Derby County	FL	14	6	4	4	14	2	3	9	28	8	7	13	39	45	28.6%	29 August 1953	9 March 2024	
Doncaster Rovers	FL	20	11	2	7	20	6	2	12	40	17	4	19	64	66	40%	24 August 1953	5 April 2021	
Dover Athletic	FC	1	0	1	0	1	0	1	0	2	0	2	0	2	2	0%	4 October 2014	18 April 2015	
Dudley Town	BD	1	1	0	0	1	0	0	1	2	1	0	1	8	2	50%	1 October 1898	29 April 1899	
Eastleigh	FC	1	0	0	1	1	0	1	0	2	0	1	1	2	3	0%	30 September 2014	7 March 2015	
Eastleigh Athletic ‡	WL	1	1	0	0	1	1	0	0	2	2	0	0	11	2	100%	1 January 1898	30 April 1898	
Everton	FL	1	0	1	0	1	0	0	1	2	0	1	1	0	4	0%	25 December 1953	28 December 1953	
Exeter City †	SL, FL	52	24	18	10	51	9	16	26	103	33	34	36	148	147	32%	5 September 1908	26 September 2026	
Fleetwood Town †	FL	10	4	3	3	11	2	4	5	21	6	7	8	21	28	28.6%	22 September 2012	31 October 2026	
Forest Green Rovers	FC, FL	3	0	1	2	3	1	1	1	6	1	2	3	5	7	16.7%	25 August 2014	11 March 2023	
Fulham	SL, FL	30	16	7	7	30	7	6	17	60	23	13	24	93	98	38.3%	21 November 1903	12 March 1999	
Gateshead	FC	1	1	0	0	1	1	0	0	2	2	0	0	4	2	100%	19 December 2014	28 February 2015	
Gillingham †	SL, FL	67	41	10	16	67	15	12	40	134	56	22	56	188	176	41.8%	14 October 1899	19 September 2026	(Note: Includes matches when Gillingham were known as New Brompton)
Gloucester City	WL	3	1	0	2	3	2	0	1	6	3	0	3	14	15	50%	14 October 1893	1 February 1896	
Gravesend United ‡	SL	2	2	0	0	2	1	0	1	4	3	0	1	20	6	75%	4 November 1899	27 December 1900	
Grimsby Town †	FL, FC	20	11	4	5	21	6	6	9	41	17	10	14	60	62	41.5%	11 September 1920	12 September 2026	
Halesowen Town	BD	2	2	0	0	2	1	1	0	4	3	1	0	17	9	75%	13 November 1897	27 February 1899	(Note: Halesowen Town were known as Halesowen when they faced Rovers)
Halifax Town ‡	FL	7	7	0	0	7	1	4	2	14	8	4	2	22	11	57.1%	8 September 1962	9 February 2002	
FC Halifax Town	FC	1	1	0	0	1	0	1	0	2	1	1	0	4	3	50%	30 August 2014	14 March 2015	
Harrogate Town	FL	2	1	0	1	2	2	0	0	4	3	0	1	7	3	75%	30 October 2021	6 April 2026	
Hartlepool United	FL	12	6	4	2	12	3	3	6	24	9	7	8	30	26	37.5%	6 September 1968	15 January 2022	
Hereford Thistle ‡	WL, BD	3	2	0	1	3	1	1	1	6	3	1	2	23	12	50%	15 September 1894	9 April 1899	
Hereford Town ‡	BD	2	2	0	0	2	1	0	1	4	3	0	1	12	3	75%	15 January 1898	11 February 1899	
Hereford United ‡	FL	5	2	2	1	5	2	3	0	10	4	5	1	17	8	40%	11 September 1973	10 January 2012	
Huddersfield Town	FL	19	8	7	4	19	6	5	8	38	14	12	12	50	47	36.8%	3 September 1956	8 March 2025	
Hull City	FL	22	9	7	6	22	7	3	12	44	16	10	18	52	65	36.4%	3 October 1953	6 March 2021	
Ipswich Town	FL	17	8	7	2	18	8	1	9	35	16	8	11	57	45	45.7%	1 October 1938	14 February 2023	
Kettering Town	SL	4	4	0	0	4	1	2	1	8	5	2	1	19	7	62.5%	15 September 1900	5 March 1904	
Kidderminster Harriers	BD, FL, FC	7	5	1	1	7	2	3	2	14	7	4	3	29	12	50%	23 March 1898	6 April 2015	
Leeds United	FL	8	3	3	2	8	0	4	4	16	3	7	6	28	29	18.8%	10 October 1953	8 May 2010	
Leicester City	FL	9	2	5	2	9	1	2	6	18	3	7	8	18	28	16.7%	28 November 1953	21 February 2009	
Leyton ‡	SL	6	0	5	1	6	1	1	4	12	1	6	5	7	20	8.3%	15 December 1906	8 April 1912	
Leyton Orient	FL	53	25	14	14	53	17	11	25	106	42	25	39	160	155	39.6%	15 April 1930	1 January 2025	
Lincoln City	FL, FC	25	9	9	7	26	10	2	14	51	19	11	21	61	67	37.3%	19 September 1953	15 March 2025	
Liverpool	FL	8	4	1	3	8	1	0	7	16	5	1	10	21	32	31.3%	6 September 1954	16 December 1961	
Luton Town	SL, FL	55	32	13	10	55	10	12	33	110	42	25	43	166	168	38.2%	10 November 1900	30 March 2019	
Macclesfield Town ‡	FL, FC	9	1	6	2	9	2	2	5	18	3	8	7	19	21	16.7%	18 December 1998	25 March 2015	
Manchester City	FL	1	0	1	0	1	0	1	0	2	0	2	0	2	2	0%	12 December 1998	1 May 1999	
Manchester United	FL	1	0	1	0	1	0	0	1	2	0	1	1	1	3	0%	21 September 1974	28 March 1975	
Mangotsfield ‡	WL	4	3	0	1	4	3	0	1	8	6	0	2	26	6	75%	1 October 1892	April 1896	(Note: Date of last match against Mangotsfield is not known. It took place some time between 5 April and 24 April 1896)
Mansfield Town	FL	27	15	8	4	27	7	6	14	54	22	14	18	76	68	40.7%	19 September 1931	29 March 2025	
Merthyr Town ‡	SL, FL	13	8	5	0	13	4	4	5	26	12	9	5	42	27	46.2%	25 December 1912	25 January 1930	
Middlesbrough	FL	12	5	2	5	12	3	2	7	24	8	4	12	41	45	33.3%	11 December 1954	25 April 1992	
Millwall	SL, FL	58	37	12	9	56	12	13	31	114	49	25	40	147	140	43%	14 March 1900	30 April 2017	(Note: Jay (1987) lists both Southern League meetings with Millwall in the 1904–05 season as being played at home.)
Milton Keynes Dons	FL	12	3	4	5	12	2	2	8	24	5	6	13	18	35	20.8%	29 September 1981	27 January 2026	(Note: Includes matches when Milton Keynes Dons were known as Wimbledon)
Morecambe	FL	5	3	1	1	5	2	1	2	10	5	2	3	17	20	50%	24 September 2011	28 January 2023	
Newcastle United	FL	7	2	3	2	7	1	2	4	14	3	5	6	14	20	21.4%	18 November 1961	24 February 1993	
Newport County †	SL, FL	36	21	7	8	35	7	10	18	71	28	17	26	117	105	39.4%	27 September 1919	22 August 2026	
Northampton Town	SL, FL	65	30	20	15	65	15	16	34	130	45	36	49	191	197	34.6%	21 September 1901	22 February 2025	
Norwich City	SL, FL	36	21	7	8	36	4	14	18	72	25	21	26	109	113	34.7%	28 October 1905	1 May 2010	
Nottingham Forest	FL	10	6	2	2	10	0	3	7	20	6	5	9	28	35	30%	19 November 1949	8 April 2008	
Notts County	FL	43	15	19	9	43	10	10	23	86	25	29	32	118	138	29.1%	4 October 1930	2 May 2026	
Nuneaton Borough	FC	1	1	0	0	1	1	0	0	2	2	0	0	5	1	100%	16 September 2014	4 January 2015	(Note: Nuneaton Borough was known as Nuneaton Town when they played against Rovers in the 2014–15 season)
Oldham Athletic †	FL	30	18	8	4	30	7	6	17	60	25	14	21	79	78	41.7%	16 April 1954	17 February 2026	
Oxford United	FL	31	15	8	8	30	12	5	13	61	27	13	21	79	65	44.3%	18 September 1965	27 January 2024	
Peterborough United	FL	23	9	7	7	22	2	9	11	45	11	16	18	62	77	24.4%	4 September 1962	2 February 2025	
Plymouth Argyle	SL, FL	60	26	16	18	60	10	17	33	120	36	33	51	162	198	30%	26 December 1903	25 April 2023	
Port Vale †	FL	32	19	8	5	32	3	8	21	64	22	16	26	80	83	34.4%	7 January 1939	29 March 2024	
Portsmouth	SL, FL	37	17	8	12	36	4	6	26	73	21	14	38	95	122	28.8%	7 October 1899	26 December 2023	
Preston North End	FL	16	9	4	3	16	3	7	6	32	12	11	9	46	38	37.5%	7 October 1961	15 April 2000	
Queens Park Rangers	SL, FL	45	24	11	10	47	8	6	33	92	32	17	43	128	156	34.8%	16 December 1899	11 November 1980	(Note: Jay (1987) lists both Southern League meetings with Queens Park Rangers in the 1904–05 season as being played away from home.)
Reading	WL, SL, FL	58	25	20	13	60	12	13	35	118	37	33	48	154	180	31.4%	2 March 1898	26 April 2025	(Note: Jay (1987) lists both Southern League meetings with Reading in the 1903–04 season as being played away from home.)
Rochdale †	FL	19	5	8	6	20	4	9	7	39	9	17	13	45	51	23.1%	27 September 1969	30 April 2022	
Rotherham United †	FL	31	20	2	9	30	4	13	13	61	24	15	22	86	88	39.3%	21 November 1953	5 September 2026	
Rushden & Diamonds ‡	FL	4	1	0	3	4	1	1	2	8	2	1	5	9	13	25%	1 December 2001	8 April 2006	
Salford City †	FL	3	2	0	1	2	0	1	1	5	2	1	2	5	5	40%	23 November 2021	20 October 2026	
St Paul's ‡	WL	2	2	0	0	2	1	1	0	4	3	1	0	13	1	75%	30 November 1895	6 February 1897	
Scunthorpe United	FL	21	10	8	3	21	8	6	7	42	18	14	10	73	52	42.9%	30 August 1958	7 May 2022	
Sheffield United	FL	12	7	5	0	12	2	3	7	24	9	8	7	37	38	37.5%	6 October 1956	14 February 2017	
Sheffield Wednesday	FL	7	2	3	2	7	0	2	5	14	2	5	7	21	32	14.3%	3 September 1955	18 April 2023	
Sheppey United	SL	1	1	0	0	1	1	0	0	2	2	0	0	5	2	100%	9 September 1899	9 December 1899	
Shrewsbury Town †	BD, FL	37	23	10	4	38	14	7	17	75	37	17	21	120	84	49.3%	11 September 1897	17 October 2026	
Southampton	WL, SL, FL	28	14	7	7	28	4	1	23	56	18	8	30	79	111	32.1%	21 September 1898	16 April 2011	
Southend United	SL, FL	60	37	11	12	60	8	20	32	120	45	31	44	179	175	37.5%	6 February 1909	7 March 2020	
Southport	FL, FC	5	4	0	1	5	1	1	3	10	5	1	4	12	11	50%	23 September 1967	11 April 2015	
Staple Hill ‡	WL	4	3	1	0	4	2	0	2	8	5	1	2	19	13	62.5%	2 December 1893	12 December 1896	
Stevenage	FL	4	0	1	3	4	2	1	1	8	2	2	4	9	11	25%	24 November 2015	21 April 2025	
Stockport County	FL	12	5	5	2	12	5	0	7	24	10	5	9	27	28	41.7%	18 November 1967	11 February 2025	
Stoke City	SL, FL	16	10	4	2	16	5	1	10	32	15	5	12	58	50	46.9%	28 February 1912	31 March 2001	(Note: Includes matches when Stoke City were known as Stoke)
Stourbridge	BD	2	1	0	1	2	0	0	2	4	1	0	3	4	8	25%	18 December 1897	4 April 1899	
Sunderland	FL	15	9	3	3	15	0	6	9	30	9	9	12	40	57	30%	27 September 1958	27 March 2021	
Sutton United	FL	1	1	0	0	1	0	1	0	2	1	1	0	3	1	50%	5 February 2022	15 February 2022	
Swansea City	SL, FL	37	19	12	6	37	9	11	17	74	28	23	23	119	109	37.8%	25 December 1919	24 March 2008	(Note: Includes matches when Swansea City were known as Swansea Town)
Swindon Town †(rivalry)	WL, SL, FL	68	37	9	22	67	16	13	38	135	53	22	60	187	193	39.3%	15 September 1897	24 October 2026	
Swindon Wanderers ‡	WL	2	2	0	0	2	2	0	0	4	4	0	0	17	4	100%	29 September 1894	25 April 1896	
Telford United ‡	BD	1	1	0	0	1	1	0	0	2	2	0	0	9	2	100%	17 December 1898	15 April 1899	(Note: Includes matches when Telford United were known as Wellington Town)
AFC Telford United	FC	1	1	0	0	1	1	0	0	2	2	0	0	2	0	100%	23 August 2014	1 November 2014	
Thames ‡	FL	2	2	0	0	2	2	0	0	4	4	0	0	12	2	100%	17 December 1930	26 December 1931	
Torquay United	FL, FC	34	21	7	6	34	9	10	15	68	30	17	21	102	85	44.1%	29 October 1927	1 January 2015	
Tottenham Hotspur	SL, FL	10	4	2	4	10	1	1	8	20	5	3	12	21	50	25%	24 February 1900	18 March 1978	
Tranmere Rovers †	FL	17	10	3	4	17	7	6	4	34	17	9	8	45	34	50%	10 November 1967	18 April 2026	
Trowbridge Town	WL	6	3	3	0	6	2	1	3	12	5	4	3	34	26	41.7%	8 October 1892	2 April 1898	
Walsall †	FL	49	26	9	14	49	15	13	21	98	41	22	35	161	142	41.8%	27 August 1927	3 February 2026	
Warmley ‡	WL	6	1	3	2	5	0	0	5	11	1	3	7	12	21	9.1%	12 November 1892	13 April 1898	
Watford	SL, FL	57	24	12	21	57	9	11	37	114	33	23	58	143	183	28.9%	23 February 1901	28 February 1998	
Welling United	FC	1	1	0	0	1	0	1	0	2	1	1	0	3	0	50%	29 November 2014	6 December 2014	
Wellingborough Town ‡	SL	4	4	0	0	4	2	0	2	8	6	0	2	29	9	75%	12 October 1901	4 March 1905	
Wells City	WL	1	1	0	0	1	0	1	0	2	1	1	0	7	3	50%	19 November 1892	11 March 1893	
West Bromwich Albion	FL	3	1	2	0	3	0	1	2	6	1	3	2	7	11	16.7%	22 October 1974	11 May 1991	
West Bromwich Albion Reserves	BD	2	2	0	0	2	0	0	2	4	2	0	2	20	6	50%	1 September 1897	4 March 1899	
West Ham United	SL, FL	26	9	8	9	26	5	4	17	52	14	12	26	57	90	26.9%	15 January 1900	24 April 1993	(Note: Includes matches when West Ham United were known as Thames Ironworks)
Wigan Athletic	FL	16	9	4	3	16	2	3	11	32	11	7	14	47	47	34.4%	16 October 1982	25 January 2025	
AFC Wimbledon	FL	9	6	1	2	9	4	3	2	18	10	4	4	27	12	55.6%	6 August 2011	13 March 2021	
Woking	FC	1	1	0	0	1	0	1	0	2	1	1	0	2	0	50%	20 September 2014	17 January 2015	
Wolverhampton Wanderers	FL	6	0	5	1	6	3	1	2	12	3	6	3	15	21	25%	27 December 1976	13 March 1993	
Wolverhampton Wanderers Reserves	BD	2	0	1	1	2	0	1	1	4	0	2	2	3	7	0%	22 January 1898	1 April 1899	
Worcester Rovers ‡	BD	2	2	0	0	2	2	0	0	4	4	0	0	22	2	100%	6 November 1897	5 November 1898	
Workington	FL	3	1	1	1	3	1	1	1	6	2	2	2	9	5	33.3%	28 November 1964	11 March 1967	
Wrexham	FL, FC	23	15	4	4	23	3	6	14	46	18	10	18	60	54	39.1%	1 September 1962	18 April 2025	
Wycombe Wanderers	FL	19	7	1	11	19	5	4	10	38	12	5	21	39	50	31.6%	27 August 1994	18 February 2025	
Yeovil Town	FL	7	3	2	2	7	3	2	2	14	6	4	4	20	18	42.9%	13 December 2003	16 April 2016	
York City †	FL	22	10	6	6	23	7	6	10	45	17	12	16	59	54	37.8%	10 September 1965	15 August 2026	
Total		2601	1335	656	610	2599	610	622	1367	5200	1945	1278	1977	7562	7503	37.4%	1 October 1892	21 November 2026	

== Bibliography ==
- Byrne, Stephen; Jay, Mike (2003). Bristol Rovers Football Club: The Definitive History 1883–2003. Stroud: Tempus. ISBN 0-7524-2717-2.
- Byrne, Stephen; Jay, Mike (2014). Bristol Rovers: The Official Definitive History. Stroud: Amberley. ISBN 978-1-4456-3619-1.
- Jay, Mike (1987). Bristol Rovers F.C.: A Complete Record 1883–1987. Derby: Breedon Books. ISBN 0-907969-26-7.
