= 1909–10 Western Football League =

Western Football League
- Season: 1909–10
- Champions: Treharris

The 1909–10 season was the 18th in the history of the Western Football League.

After Division One was scrapped at the end of the previous season, the members clubs all having resigned to concentrate on the Southern League, the Western League became a single-division league for the first time since the inaugural 1892–93 season. The champions were Treharris, the first time that the title had been won by a Welsh team, although they left the league at the end of the season.

== Final table ==
The old Division Two became the only division for this season, and two new clubs joined, increasing the number of clubs from 12 to 13 clubs, after Staple Hill disbanded.

- Merthyr Town
- Ton Pentre
- Aberdare changed their name to Aberdare Town

Pos	Team	Pld	W	D	L	GF	GA	GR	Pts	Result
1	Treharris	24	20	2	2	84	21	4.000	42	Left the league at the end of the season
2	Bristol City Reserves	24	18	3	3	86	23	3.739	39	
3	Bristol Rovers Reserves	24	15	3	6	79	25	3.160	33	
4	Ton Pentre	24	14	4	6	68	26	2.615	32	Left the league at the end of the season
5	Merthyr Town	24	14	3	7	57	24	2.375	31	Left the league at the end of the season
6	Welton Rovers	24	13	5	6	51	46	1.109	31	
7	Aberdare	23	13	2	8	57	30	1.900	28 (Note: Two games were left unplayed due to the away team not arriving: 26 April 1910 – Weymouth v Aberdare Town 27 April 1910 – Barry District v Kingswood Rovers)	Left the league at the end of the season
8	Barry District	23	11	1	11	57	57	1.000	23	
9	Bath City	24	5	6	13	31	66	0.470	15 (Note: Bath City had one point deducted for a breach of the rules.)	
10	Kingswood Rovers	23	4	2	17	28	80	0.350	10	Left the league at the end of the season
11	Radstock Town	24	4	1	19	24	88	0.273	9	Left the league at the end of the season
12	Weymouth	23	3	2	18	25	93	0.269	8	
13	Paulton Rovers	24	2	2	20	28	96	0.292	6	

Rules for classification: The system of using goal average to separate two teams tied on points was used up to and including the 1976–77 season. The points system: 2 points for a win, 1 point for a draw and 0 points for losing.
