= 1908–09 Western Football League =

Western Football League
- Season: 1908–09
- Champions: Millwall (Division One); Bristol City Reserves (Division Two)

The 1908–09 season was the 17th in the history of the Western Football League.

For the last time, Division One was split into two sections of six clubs, reorganised from the previous season, with the winner of each section playing each other in a Championship decider. Brighton & Hove Albion won Section A and reigning champions Millwall won Section B, with Millwall winning the decider 2–1 in a replay after the first match was drawn. At the end of this season, all 14 clubs in Division One resigned from the League, leaving Division Two as the only division in the league. All the member clubs of Division One also competed in the Southern League during this season. As with the previous season, the Division Two champions were Bristol City Reserves.

== Division One ==
One new club joined Division One, which remained at 14 clubs after Tottenham Hotspur left.

- Croydon Common

=== Section A ===
Pos	Team	Pld	W	D	L	GF	GA	GR	Pts	Result
1	Brighton & Hove Albion	12	7	2	3	23	13	1.769	16	All clubs left at the end of the season
2	Queens Park Rangers	12	6	1	5	28	24	1.167	13	All clubs left at the end of the season
3	Crystal Palace	12	5	2	5	23	22	1.045	12	All clubs left at the end of the season
4	Luton Town	12	5	2	5	24	24	1.000	12	All clubs left at the end of the season
5	Croydon Common	12	5	2	5	16	24	0.667	12	All clubs left at the end of the season
6	Reading	12	4	2	6	19	21	0.905	10	All clubs left at the end of the season
7	Leyton	12	4	1	7	16	21	0.762	9	All clubs left at the end of the season

=== Section B ===
Pos	Team	Pld	W	D	L	GF	GA	GR	Pts	Result
1	Millwall	12	8	2	2	24	11	2.182	18	All clubs left at the end of the season
2	Southampton	12	7	0	5	20	20	1.000	14	All clubs left at the end of the season
3	Plymouth Argyle	12	6	1	5	12	13	0.923	13	All clubs left at the end of the season
4	Portsmouth	12	5	2	5	21	21	1.000	12	All clubs left at the end of the season
5	West Ham United	12	5	0	7	21	23	0.913	10	All clubs left at the end of the season
6	Bristol Rovers	12	4	1	7	16	23	0.696	9	All clubs left at the end of the season
7	Brentford	12	3	2	7	10	13	0.769	8	All clubs left at the end of the season

=== Championship decider ===
At the end of the season, the winners of the two sections played a match to decide the overall champions. For the first time, the match was drawn and a replay was arranged.

Section A	v	Section B

1909

Brighton & Hove Albion	1 – 1	Millwall

Boleyn Ground, Upton Park
1909

Brighton & Hove Albion	1 – 2	Millwall

Boleyn Ground, Upton Park

== Division Two ==
Three new clubs joined Division Two, which was increased from nine to 12 clubs.

- Aberdare
- Barry District, joining from the South Wales League
- Bath City

Pos	Team	Pld	W	D	L	GF	GA	GR	Pts	Result
1	Bristol City Reserves	22	15	4	3	59	16	3.688	34	
2	Bristol Rovers Reserves	22	16	0	6	81	29	2.793	32	
3	Aberdare	22	12	5	5	56	30	1.867	29	
4	Treharris	22	12	2	8	57	45	1.267	26	
5	Staple Hill	22	9	4	9	41	60	0.683	22	Disbanded at the end of the season
6	Radstock Town	22	8	5	9	37	60	0.617	21	
7	Weymouth	22	8	4	10	47	64	0.734	20	
8	Bath City	22	6	7	9	39	45	0.867	19	
9	Barry District	22	8	3	11	42	50	0.840	19	
10	Welton Rovers	22	7	3	12	41	54	0.759	17	
11	Kingswood Rovers	22	5	3	14	24	55	0.436	13	
12	Paulton Rovers	22	5	2	15	39	55	0.709	12	

Rules for classification: The system of using goal average to separate two teams tied on points was used up to and including the 1976–77 season. The points system: 2 points for a win, 1 point for a draw and 0 points for losing.
