= 1907–08 Western Football League =

Western Football League
- Season: 1907–08
- Champions: Millwall (Division One); Bristol City Reserves (Division Two)

The 1907–08 season was the 16th in the history of the Western Football League.

Division One continued to be split into two sections of six clubs, reorganised from the previous season, with the winner of each section playing each other in a Championship decider. Southampton won Section A and Millwall won Section B, with Millwall winning the decider 1–0. Tottenham Hotspur left the league at the end of the season as they were elected to the Football League for 1908–09. All the member clubs of Division One also competed in the Southern League during this season. The Division Two champions were Bristol City Reserves.

== Division One ==
Four new clubs joined Division One, which was increased from 12 to 14 clubs after Chelsea and Fulham left.

- Brighton & Hove Albion
- Crystal Palace
- Leyton
- Luton Town

=== Section A ===
Pos	Team	Pld	W	D	L	GF	GA	GAv	Pts
1	Southampton	12	8	1	3	30	12	2.500	17
2	Portsmouth	12	7	1	4	25	13	1.923	15
3	Brighton & Hove Albion	12	6	2	4	19	19	1.000	14
4	Plymouth Argyle	12	5	2	5	14	17	0.824	12
5	Queens Park Rangers	12	5	1	6	20	23	0.870	11
6	Brentford	12	2	5	5	13	21	0.619	9
7	Leyton	12	2	2	8	11	27	0.407	6

=== Section B ===
Pos	Team	Pld	W	D	L	GF	GA	GAv	Pts	Result
1	Millwall	12	9	2	1	31	15	2.067	20	
2	Tottenham Hotspur	12	7	0	5	26	13	2.000	14	Elected to the Football League Second Division
3	Bristol Rovers	12	6	2	4	22	29	0.759	14	
4	Luton Town	12	4	4	4	16	21	0.762	12	
5	Reading	12	4	3	5	20	25	0.800	11	
6	Crystal Palace	12	3	4	5	16	17	0.941	10	
7	West Ham United	12	1	1	10	16	27	0.593	3	

=== Championship decider ===
At the end of the season, the winners of the two sections played a match to decide the overall champions.

Section A	v	Section B

13 April 1908

Southampton	0 – 1	Millwall

White Hart Lane, Tottenham

== Division Two ==
Two new clubs joined Division Two, which was reduced from 10 to nine clubs after Trowbridge Town and 121st R.F.A. left the league, and Newport disbanded.

- Kingswood Rovers
- Weymouth

Pos	Team	Pld	W	D	L	GF	GA	GAv	Pts
1	Bristol City Reserves	16	12	1	3	55	13	4.231	25 (Note: The tables as published at the time contained errors, hence the totals do not balance in some columns.)
2	Bristol Rovers Reserves	16	11	3	2	44	15	2.933	25
3	Treharris	16	11	1	4	53	19	2.789	23
4	Kingswood Rovers	16	7	1	8	27	33	0.818	15
5	Paulton Rovers	16	7	1	8	34	46	0.739	15
6	Welton Rovers	16	4	4	8	28	46	0.609	12
7	Weymouth	16	5	2	9	25	23	1.087	12
8	Radstock Town	16	4	3	9	25	39	0.641	11
9	Staple Hill	16	3	0	13	18	40	0.450	6

Rules for classification: The system of using goal average to separate two teams tied on points was used up to and including the 1976–77 season. The points system: 2 points for a win, 1 point for a draw and 0 points for losing.
