= Alex Ball =

English footballer

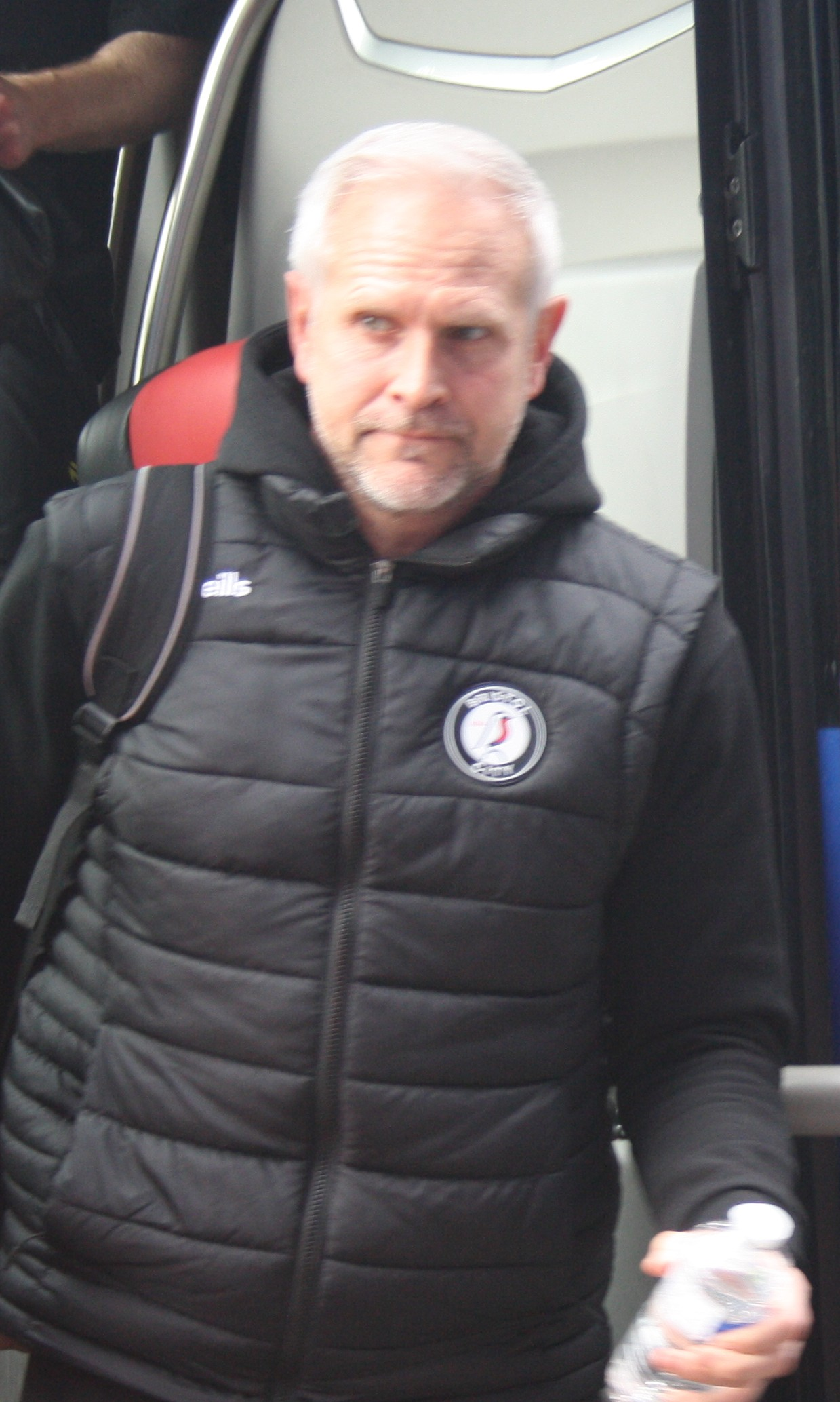
- Ball in 2026.

Personal information
- Date of birth: 4 August 1981 (age 45)
- Place of birth: Bristol, England
- Position: Defender

Senior career*
Years	Team	Apps	(Gls)
1998–2001	Bristol City	1	(0)
- * Club domestic league appearances and goals

Alex Ball (born 4 August 1981) is a footballer who played in The Football League for Bristol City. Ball was a youth academy coach at Southampton after joining from his post as head of youth development at Bristol City. Ball has more recently been part of the first team coaching set up at Bristol City having spent a number of years working with the U23s in assistant and head coach positions

== Career ==
His only appearance for City came in a 2–0 defeat away at cross city rivals Bristol Rovers at the end of the 1999–2000 season. He was released in 2001 and has since played for non-league sides Clevedon Town, Team Bath, Mangotsfield United and Paulton Rovers. He has also coached at Bristol City's academy and at the Bristol Academy of Sport.
