= 1900–01 Western Football League =

Western Football League
- Season: 1900–01
- Champions: Portsmouth (Division One); Bristol East (Division Two)

The 1900–01 season was the ninth in the history of the Western Football League.

Portsmouth were the new champions of Division One, and also competed in the Southern League during this season, along with all the other members of Division One. The new clubs from London dominated the season, although Bristol City were elected to the Football League, being the first Western League club to achieve this. The Division Two champions for the second season running were Bristol East.

== Division One ==
Six new clubs joined Division One, which was increased to nine clubs from four after Bedminster merged with Bristol City.

- Millwall Athletic
- Portsmouth
- Queens Park Rangers
- Tottenham Hotspur
- Reading and Southampton rejoined from the Southern League Division One though, like the other clubs, they played in both leagues.

Pos	Team	Pld	W	D	L	GF	GA	GR	Pts	Result
1	Portsmouth	16	11	2	3	36	23	1.565	24	
2	Millwall Athletic	16	9	5	2	33	14	2.357	23	
3	Tottenham Hotspur	16	8	5	3	37	19	1.947	21	
4	Queens Park Rangers	16	7	4	5	39	24	1.625	18	
5	Bristol City	16	6	4	6	27	24	1.125	16	Elected to the Football League Second Division
6	Reading	16	5	5	6	23	31	0.742	15	
7	Southampton	16	5	2	9	19	29	0.655	12	
8	Bristol Rovers	16	4	1	11	18	42	0.429	9	
9	Swindon Town	16	2	2	12	9	35	0.257	6	

== Division Two ==
Three new clubs joined Division Two, which was increased to eight clubs from five. It was the first season not to be fully completed, with several games remaining unplayed at the end of the season.

- Bedminster St Francis
- Paulton Rovers, also playing in the Somerset Senior League
- Weston-super-Mare

Pos	Team	Pld	W	D	L	GF	GA	GR	Pts	Result
1	Bristol East	12	11	0	1	41	8	5.125	22	
2	Paulton Rovers	9	6	2	1	32	12	2.667	14	
3	Staple Hill	10	6	1	3	34	17	2.000	13	
4	Cotham	11	3	2	6	20	49	0.408	8	
5	Bedminster St Francis	6	3	1	2	16	13	1.231	7	Left the league at the end of the season
6	Weston-super-Mare	10	2	0	8	12	22	0.545	4	
7	Fishponds	12	1	0	11	6	40	0.150	0 (Note: Fishponds had two points deducted for fielding an ineligible player.)	Left the league at the end of the season
8	Weston (Bath)	0	0	0	0	0	0	—	0	Resigned during the season without playing a game

Rules for classification: The system of using goal average to separate two teams tied on points was used up to and including the 1976–77 season. The points system: 2 points for a win, 1 point for a draw and 0 points for losing. The unplayed games were ignored.
