= 1906–07 Western Football League =

Western Football League
- Season: 1906–07
- Champions: West Ham United (Division One); Staple Hill (Division Two)

The 1906–07 season was the 15th in the history of the Western Football League.

Division One was split into two sections of six clubs, with the winner of each section playing each other in a Championship decider. Fulham won Section A and West Ham United won Section B, with West Ham winning the decider 1–0. Fulham left the league at the end of the season as they were elected to the Football League for 1907–08. Chelsea, who made their first and only appearance in the league this season, were competing in the Football League at the same time. All the other member clubs of Division One also competed in the Southern League during this season. The Division Two champions for the first and only time were Staple Hill.

== Division One ==
One new club joined Division One, which was increased from 11 to 12 clubs and split into two sections of six.

- Chelsea

=== Section A ===
Pos	Team	Pld	W	D	L	GF	GA	GR	Pts	Result
1	Fulham	10	7	1	2	16	9	1.778	15	Elected to the Football League Second Division
2	Queens Park Rangers	10	5	1	4	17	11	1.545	11	
3	Brentford	10	5	1	4	19	19	1.000	11	
4	Reading	10	4	1	5	12	18	0.667	9	
5	Bristol Rovers	10	3	1	6	17	17	1.000	7	
6	Chelsea	10	2	3	5	7	14	0.500	7	Left at the end of the season

=== Section B ===
Pos	Team	Pld	W	D	L	GF	GA	GR	Pts
1	West Ham United	10	7	1	2	25	14	1.786	15
2	Plymouth Argyle	10	5	3	2	16	10	1.600	13
3	Portsmouth	10	4	2	4	16	19	0.842	10
4	Tottenham Hotspur	10	3	3	4	13	15	0.867	9
5	Southampton	10	4	0	6	14	16	0.875	8
6	Millwall	10	1	3	6	5	15	0.333	5

=== Championship decider ===
At the end of the season, the winners of the two sections played a match to decide the overall champions.

Section A	v	Section B

15 April 1907

Fulham	0 – 1	West Ham United

Stamford Bridge, Fulham

== Division Two ==
Three new clubs joined Division Two, which remained at 10 clubs after Salisbury City, Bristol East and Chippenham Town left the league.

- 121st R.F.A.
- Newport
- Treharris

Pos	Team	Pld	W	D	L	GF	GA	GR	Pts	Result
1	Staple Hill	18	12	2	4	44	28	1.571	26	
2	Newport	18	11	3	4	52	38	1.368	25	Disbanded at the end of the season
3	Bristol City Reserves	18	11	2	5	54	19	2.842	24	
4	Treharris	18	12	0	6	62	24	2.583	24	
5	Bristol Rovers Reserves	18	11	1	6	60	27	2.222	23	
6	Radstock Town	18	7	3	8	37	41	0.902	17	
7	Welton Rovers	18	7	1	10	33	54	0.611	15	
8	Paulton Rovers	18	4	4	10	36	53	0.679	12	
9	121st R.F.A.	18	5	2	11	27	53	0.509	12	Left at the end of the season
10	Trowbridge Town	18	1	0	17	18	86	0.209	2	Left to join the Wiltshire County League

Rules for classification: The system of using goal average to separate two teams tied on points was used up to and including the 1976–77 season. The points system: 2 points for a win, 1 point for a draw and 0 points for losing.
