= 1903–04 Western Football League =

Western Football League
- Season: 1903–04
- Champions: Tottenham Hotspur (Division One); Bristol City Reserves (Division Two)

The 1903–04 season was the 12th in the history of the Western Football League.

Tottenham Hotspur were the champions of Division One for the first time, and along with all the other members of Division One, also competed in the Southern League during this season. The Division Two champions were newcomers Bristol City Reserves.

== Division One ==
One new club joined Division One, which remained at nine clubs after Millwall Athletic left the league.

- Plymouth Argyle

Pos	Team	Pld	W	D	L	GF	GA	GR	Pts
1	Tottenham Hotspur	16	11	3	2	32	12	2.667	25
2	Southampton	16	9	3	4	30	18	1.667	21
3	Plymouth Argyle	16	8	4	4	23	19	1.211	20
4	Portsmouth	16	7	2	7	24	22	1.091	16
5	Brentford	16	6	4	6	19	23	0.826	16
6	Queens Park Rangers	16	5	5	6	15	21	0.714	15
7	Reading	16	4	4	8	16	26	0.615	12
8	Bristol Rovers	16	4	3	9	29	29	1.000	11
9	West Ham United	16	2	4	10	13	31	0.419	8

== Division Two ==
Four new clubs joined Division Two, which was increased from eight clubs to 10 after Cotham Amateurs and St George left the league.

- Bristol City Reserves
- Radstock Town, rejoining the league
- Warmley, rejoining the league
- Welton Rovers, joining from the Somerset Senior League

Pos	Team	Pld	W	D	L	GF	GA	GR	Pts	Result
1	Bristol City Reserves	18	15	2	1	64	17	3.765	32 (Note: The tables as published at the time contained errors, hence the totals do not balance in some columns.)	
2	Staple Hill	18	13	1	4	53	19	2.789	27	
3	Swindon Town Reserves	18	10	3	5	50	30	1.667	23	
4	Bristol Rovers Reserves	18	9	2	7	50	30	1.667	20	
5	Bristol East	18	9	1	8	30	27	1.111	19	
6	Paulton Rovers	18	9	1	8	37	46	0.804	19	Moved to the Somerset Senior League
7	Trowbridge Town	18	6	2	10	22	54	0.407	14	
8	Warmley	18	3	3	12	32	52	0.615	9	
9	Welton Rovers	18	3	3	12	32	67	0.478	9	
10	Radstock Town	18	3	2	13	26	54	0.481	8	

Rules for classification: The system of using goal average to separate two teams tied on points was used up to and including the 1976–77 season. The points system: 2 points for a win, 1 point for a draw and 0 points for losing.
