= 1896–97 Western Football League =

Western Football League
- Season: 1896–97
- Champions: Warmley (Division One); Eastville Wanderers (Division Two)

The 1896–97 season was the fifth in the history of the Western Football League, which had been known as the Bristol & District league until 1895.

Warmley were the Division One champions for the fourth time in five years, and also began competing in the Southern League during this season. Eastville Wanderers won Division Two in only their second season in the league.

At the end of this season the league was restructured, with a new Professional Section being formed, taking five clubs from Division One and three new clubs joining. Division One and Division Two remained as the Amateur Section, with four clubs being promoted from Division Two to Division One, and several new clubs joining both divisions.

== Division One ==
One new club joined Division One for this season, though the number of clubs was reduced from 12 to nine after Gloucester and Swindon Wanderers left, Cardiff were expelled and Mangotsfield were relegated to Division Two.

- Bristol South End

Pos	Team	Pld	W	D	L	GF	GA	GR	Pts	Result
1	Warmley	16	13	2	1	42	9	4.667	28	Moved to new Professional Section
2	Bristol South End	16	11	0	5	28	22	1.273	22	Moved to new Professional Section
3	Bedminster	16	8	2	6	32	16	2.000	18	
4	St George	16	8	1	7	27	23	1.174	17	Moved to new Professional Section
5	Eastville Rovers	16	7	2	7	25	23	1.087	14 (Note: Eastville Rovers had two points deducted for fielding an ineligible player.)	Moved to new Professional Section
6	Trowbridge Town	16	5	3	8	21	30	0.700	13	Moved to new Professional Section
7	St Paul's	16	3	5	8	29	31	0.935	11	
8	Staple Hill	16	5	0	11	18	39	0.462	10	
9	Clifton	16	4	1	11	19	48	0.396	9	

== Division Two ==
One new team joined Division Two this season, though the number of clubs was reduced from 11 to seven after Cumberland, Clifton Reserves, St George Reserves and Warmley Reserves left the league and Frenchay resigned.

- Mangotsfield, relegated from Division One

Pos	Team	Pld	W	D	L	GF	GA	GR	Pts	Promotion
1	Eastville Wanderers (P)	12	7	4	1	25	9	2.778	18 (Note: The tables as published at the time contained errors, hence the totals do not balance in some columns.)	Promoted to Amateur Division One
2	Barton Hill (P)	12	7	3	2	28	7	4.000	17	Promoted to Amateur Division One
3	Mangotsfield (P)	12	6	3	3	23	14	1.643	15	Promoted to Amateur Division One
4	Fishponds (P)	12	4	5	3	17	16	1.063	13	Promoted to Amateur Division One
5	Bedminster Reserves	12	6	1	5	19	20	0.950	13	
6	Eastville Rovers Reserves	12	1	3	8	7	33	0.212	5	Left the league at the end of the season
7	Staple Hill Reserves	12	1	1	10	8	34	0.235	3	Left the league at the end of the season

Rules for classification: The system of using goal average to separate two teams tied on points was used up to and including the 1976–77 season. The points system: 2 points for a win, 1 point for a draw and 0 points for losing.
(P) Promoted
