= 1899–1900 Western Football League =

Western Football League
- Season: 1899–1900
- Champions: Bristol Rovers (Division One); Bristol East (Division Two)

The 1899–1900 season was the eighth in the history of the Western Football League.

Bristol Rovers were the champions of Division One, and also competed in the Southern League during this season, along with all the other members of Division One. The Division Two champions were debutants Bristol East.

== Division One ==
One new club joined Division One, which was reduced to just four clubs from seven after Trowbridge Town and Warmley resigned during the previous season, and Bristol St George and Southampton left at the end of the season.

- Bristol City rejoined from the Southern League though, like the other three clubs, they played in both leagues.
- Bristol Eastville Rovers changed their name to Bristol Rovers.

Pos	Team	Pld	W	D	L	GF	GA	GR	Pts	Result
1	Bristol Rovers	6	3	1	2	8	6	1.333	7	
2	Bedminster	6	3	1	2	10	12	0.833	7	Merged with Bristol City at the end of the season
3	Swindon Town	6	3	0	3	7	7	1.000	6	
4	Bristol City	6	2	0	4	12	12	1.000	4	

== Division Two ==
Two new clubs joined Division Two, which was reduced to five clubs after Barton Hill, Bristol Amateurs, Hanham, Midsomer Norton and Mount Hill all left at the end of the previous season.

- Bristol East
- Weston (Bath)

Pos	Team	Pld	W	D	L	GF	GA	GR	Pts
1	Bristol East	8	6	2	0	31	5	6.200	14
2	Staple Hill	8	4	4	0	22	5	4.400	12
3	Fishponds	8	3	1	4	16	29	0.552	7
4	Weston (Bath)	8	2	1	5	7	19	0.368	5
5	Cotham	8	1	0	7	8	26	0.308	2

Rules for classification: The system of using goal average to separate two teams tied on points was used up to and including the 1976–77 season. The points system: 2 points for a win, 1 point for a draw and 0 points for losing.
