= Rogerstone A.F.C. =

Association football club in Wales

Rogerstone
- Full name: Rogerstone Association Football Club
- Founded: 1890
- Ground: Newport Fugitives Athletic Ground
- League: Gwent County League Premier Division
- 2025–26: Gwent County League Premier Division, 5th of 16
Home colours

Rogerstone Association Football Club is an association football club based in Rogerstone, a large village near the city of Newport, Wales. They play in the Gwent County League Premier Division.

== History ==
The club was established in 1890. They played in the South Wales League and were league champions in 1893–94 and 1897–98 and were runners up of Division One of the league in 1899–1900 before the following season being crowned league champions for a third time. The club then moved to the Rhymney Valley League Division One in 1905–06 where they finished as champions.

The club was refounded in the 1950s by Ivor Charles James and played in the Newport and District League.

In recent years, the club has played in the Gwent County League, where in the 2017–18 season they finished champions in Division Three, gaining promotion to Division Two. The league was renamed as Division One and the club were crowned winners of the league in 2019–20.

== Colours ==
The club plays in all green.

== Honours ==
- Rhymney Valley League Division One: – Champions: 1905–06
- South Wales League Division One: – Champions: 1893–94; 1897–98; 1900–01
- South Wales League Division One: – Runners-Up: 1899–1900
- Gwent County League Division One: – Champions: 2019–20
- Gwent County League Division Three: – Champions: 2017–18; 2004–05
- South Wales Senior Cup – Winners: 1896–97; 1897–98
- South Wales Intermediate Cup – Winners: 1893–94; 1899–1900.
- Gwent Premier League County Motors Cup – Winners: 2018–19
