= 1894–95 Bristol & District League =

Bristol & District League
- Season: 1894–95
- Champions: Hereford Thistle (Division One); Warmley Res. (Division Two)

The 1894–95 season was the third in the history of the Bristol & District League, which was renamed the Western League the following season.

Hereford Thistle were the Division One champions in their debut season, but they left the league at the end of the season. Warmley Reserves won Division Two for the second year in succession.

== Division One ==
Two new clubs joined Division One for this season, increasing the number of clubs from ten to 12.

- Hereford Thistle
- Swindon Wanderers

Pos	Team	Pld	W	D	L	GF	GA	GAv	Pts	Promotion or relegation
1	Hereford Thistle (L)	22	18	3	1	93	21	4.429	39	Joined the Birmingham & District League
2	St George	22	18	3	1	76	21	3.619	39	
3	Warmley	22	14	2	6	74	30	2.467	30	
4	Staple Hill	22	11	4	7	56	38	1.474	26	
5	Gloucester	22	10	4	8	64	54	1.185	24	
6	Eastville Rovers	22	10	4	8	46	40	1.150	24	
7	Trowbridge Town	22	9	4	9	68	48	1.417	22	
8	Clifton	22	8	2	12	47	55	0.855	18	
9	Bedminster	22	7	0	15	39	73	0.534	14	
10	Swindon Wanderers	22	5	3	14	40	63	0.635	13	
11	Mangotsfield	22	5	2	15	22	68	0.324	12	
12	Clevedon (L)	22	1	1	20	23	136	0.169	3	Withdrew from league

(L) Left league at the end of the season

== Division Two ==
Two new teams joined Division Two this season, increasing the number of clubs from ten to 11 after Trowbridge Town Reserves left.

- Staple Hill Reserves
- Willsbridge, from the South Bristol & District League

St Paul's finished as runners-up in Division Two, and were elected to Division One for the following season ahead of Warmley Reserves as Warmley's first team were already playing in the top level.

Pos	Team	Pld	W	D	L	GF	GA	GAv	Pts	Promotion or relegation
1	Warmley Reserves	20	17	0	3	75	20	3.750	34	
2	St Paul's (P)	20	16	0	4	79	31	2.548	32	Elected to Western Football League Division One
3	Willsbridge (L)	20	15	1	4	48	21	2.286	31	Withdrew from league
4	St George Reserves	20	14	1	5	69	33	2.091	29	
5	Barton Hill	20	11	1	8	57	31	1.839	23	
6	Bedminster Reserves	20	8	1	11	36	30	1.200	17	
7	Eastville Rovers Reserves	20	8	0	12	45	45	1.000	16	
8	Clifton Reserves	20	7	0	13	40	68	0.588	14	
9	Mangotsfield Reserves (L)	20	4	2	14	30	84	0.357	10	Withdrew from league
10	Staple Hill Reserves	20	4	1	15	32	79	0.405	9	
11	Waverley (L)	20	2	1	17	15	74	0.203	5	Withdrew from league

Rules for classification: 2 points for a win, 1 point for a draw and 0 points for losing. The system of using goal average to separate two teams tied on points was used up to and including the 1976–77 season. The tables as published at the time contained errors, hence the totals do not balance in some columns.
(L) Left league at the end of the season; (P) Promoted
