= 1904–05 Western Football League =

Western Football League
- Season: 1904–05
- Champions: Plymouth Argyle (Division One); Bristol Rovers Reserves (Division Two)

The 1904–05 season was the 13th in the history of the Western Football League.

Plymouth Argyle were the champions of Division One for the first time, and along with all the other members of Division One, also competed in the Southern League during this season. The Division Two champions were Bristol Rovers Reserves, who completed the season unbeaten in the league.

== Division One ==
Two new clubs joined Division One, which was increased to 11 clubs from nine.

- Fulham
- Millwall rejoining the league

Pos	Team	Pld	W	D	L	GF	GA	GR	Pts
1	Plymouth Argyle	20	13	4	3	52	18	2.889	30
2	Brentford	20	11	6	3	30	22	1.364	28
3	Southampton	20	11	2	7	45	22	2.045	24
4	Portsmouth	20	10	3	7	29	30	0.967	23
5	West Ham United	20	8	4	8	37	42	0.881	20
6	Fulham	20	7	3	10	29	32	0.906	17
7	Millwall	20	7	3	10	32	40	0.800	17
8	Tottenham Hotspur	20	5	6	9	20	28	0.714	16
9	Reading	20	6	3	11	27	37	0.730	15
10	Bristol Rovers	20	7	1	12	32	44	0.727	15
11	Queens Park Rangers	20	6	3	11	27	45	0.600	15

== Division Two ==
One new club joined Division Two, which remained at 10 clubs after Paulton Rovers left to join the Somerset Senior League.

- Chippenham Town

Pos	Team	Pld	W	D	L	GF	GA	GR	Pts	Result
1	Bristol Rovers Reserves	16	13	3	0	76	5	15.200	29	
2	Bristol City Reserves	16	14	1	1	46	8	5.750	29	
3	Swindon Town Reserves	16	11	2	3	53	21	2.524	24	Left at the end of the season
4	Staple Hill	16	7	3	6	27	23	1.174	17	
5	Bristol East	16	7	1	8	38	27	1.407	15	
6	Welton Rovers	16	5	1	10	27	58	0.466	11	
7	Radstock Town	16	4	1	11	21	57	0.368	9	
8	Trowbridge Town	16	2	2	12	25	64	0.391	6	
9	Chippenham Town	16	2	0	14	24	74	0.324	4	
10	Warmley	0	0	0	0	0	0	—	0	Resigned, record expunged (Note: Warmley resigned after 10 matches, and their record was expunged.)

Rules for classification: The system of using goal average to separate two teams tied on points was used up to and including the 1976–77 season. The points system: 2 points for a win, 1 point for a draw and 0 points for losing.
