= 1901–02 in English football =

Football in England
- Season: 1901–02

Men's football
- First Division: Sunderland
- Second Division: West Bromwich Albion
- Southern League: Portsmouth
- Northern League: Bishop Auckland
- The Combination: Wrexham
- Western League: Portsmouth
- FA Cup: Sheffield United
- Sheriff of London Charity Shield: Aston Villa

The 1901–02 season was the 31st season of competitive football in England.

== League changes ==
Doncaster Rovers and Bristol City replaced Walsall and New Brighton Tower in the Football League.

Burton United were formed by a merger of Burton Swifts with former League side Burton Wanderers.

Bristol City were the third southern team to compete in the league, after Arsenal and Luton Town.

== Events ==
- 9 January 1902 – Newton Heath, the Manchester based Second Division club, are on the brink of closure and expulsion from the Football League after being issued with a winding up order. The club is £2,600 in debt.
- 28 April 1902 – Newton Heath, after being saved by new owner John Henry Davies, are renamed Manchester United.

== Honours ==
Competition	Winner
First Division	Sunderland (4)
Second Division	West Bromwich Albion
FA Cup	Sheffield United (2)
Home Championship	Scotland

Notes = Number in parentheses is the times that club has won that honour. * indicates new record for competition

== Football League ==
=== First Division ===
Pos	Team	Pld	W	D	L	GF	GA	GAv	Pts	Relegation
1	Sunderland (C)	34	19	6	9	50	35	1.429	44	
2	Everton	34	17	7	10	53	35	1.514	41	
3	Newcastle United	34	14	9	11	48	34	1.412	37	
4	Blackburn Rovers	34	15	6	13	52	48	1.083	36	
5	Nottingham Forest	34	13	9	12	43	43	1.000	35	
6	Derby County	34	13	9	12	39	41	0.951	35	
7	Bury	34	13	8	13	44	38	1.158	34	
8	Aston Villa	34	13	8	13	42	40	1.050	34	
9	The Wednesday	34	13	8	13	48	52	0.923	34	
10	Sheffield United	34	13	7	14	53	48	1.104	33	
11	Liverpool	34	10	12	12	42	38	1.105	32	
12	Bolton Wanderers	34	12	8	14	51	56	0.911	32	
13	Notts County	34	14	4	16	51	57	0.895	32	
14	Wolverhampton Wanderers	34	13	6	15	46	57	0.807	32	
15	Grimsby Town	34	13	6	15	44	60	0.733	32	
16	Stoke	34	11	9	14	45	55	0.818	31	
17	Small Heath (R)	34	11	8	15	47	45	1.044	30	Relegation to the Second Division
18	Manchester City (R)	34	11	6	17	42	58	0.724	28	Relegation to the Second Division

Source: World Football
Rules for classification: 1) Points; 2) Goal average; 3) Goals scored
(C) Champions; (R) Relegated

=== Second Division ===
Pos	Team	Pld	W	D	L	GF	GA	GAv	Pts	Promotion or relegation
1	West Bromwich Albion (C, P)	34	25	5	4	82	29	2.828	55	Promotion to the First Division
2	Middlesbrough (P)	34	23	5	6	90	24	3.750	51	Promotion to the First Division
3	Preston North End	34	18	6	10	71	32	2.219	42	
4	Woolwich Arsenal	34	18	6	10	50	26	1.923	42	
5	Lincoln City	34	14	13	7	45	35	1.286	41	
6	Bristol City	34	17	6	11	52	35	1.486	40	
7	Doncaster Rovers	34	13	8	13	49	58	0.845	34	
8	Glossop	34	10	12	12	36	40	0.900	32	
9	Burnley	34	10	10	14	41	45	0.911	30	
10	Burton United	34	11	8	15	46	54	0.852	30	
11	Barnsley	34	12	6	16	51	63	0.810	30	
12	Burslem Port Vale	34	10	9	15	43	59	0.729	29	
13	Blackpool	34	11	7	16	40	56	0.714	29	
14	Leicester Fosse	34	12	5	17	38	56	0.679	29	
15	Newton Heath	34	11	6	17	38	53	0.717	28	
16	Chesterfield Town	34	11	6	17	47	68	0.691	28	Re-elected
17	Stockport County	34	8	7	19	36	72	0.500	23	Re-elected
18	Gainsborough Trinity	34	4	11	19	30	80	0.375	19	Re-elected

Rules for classification: 1) Points; 2) Goal average; 3) Goals scored
(C) Champions; (P) Promoted
