= George Harper (footballer) =

English footballer

Personal information
- Date of birth: 12 May 1877
- Place of birth: Aston, Birmingham, England
- Date of death: 14 July 1914 (aged 37)
- Position: Inside forward

Senior career*
Years	Team	Apps	(Gls)
	Saltley Gas Company	?	(?)
	Burton Wanderers	?	(?)
	Aston Villa	0	(0)
189?–1897	Hereford Thistle	?	(?)
1897–1901	Wolverhampton Wanderers	61	(19)
1901–1902	Grimsby Town	?	(?)
1902–1903	Sunderland	9	(1)
- * Club domestic league appearances and goals

George Harper (12 May 1877 – 14 July 1914) was an English footballer who played in the Football League for Wolverhampton Wanderers, Grimsby Town and Sunderland.

== Career ==
Harper played for several amateur clubs before joining Aston Villa of the Football League. However, he failed to make a first team appearance for the club and left to join Hereford Thistle.

He was signed in August 1897 by First Division side Wolverhampton Wanderers. He made his club debut on 4 December 1897 when he scored in a 2–0 victory over Derby County, before again scoring in his second appearance a week later.

The forward made only occasional appearances during his first two seasons at Molineux but became a first team regular during the 1899–1900 season, in which he finished as the club's leading goalscorer. He scored eight goals as a regular player during the next campaign but was sold at its conclusion to Grimsby Town.

He spent the 1901–02 season with Grimsby before moving to Sunderland where he finished his league career.
