= 1895–96 Western Football League =

Western Football League
- Season: 1895–96
- Champions: Warmley (Division One); Barton Hill (Division Two)

The 1895–96 season was the fourth in the history of the Western Football League, and the first to be held under this name. The league had been known as the Bristol & District League until this season.

Warmley were the Division One champions for the third time in four years. Barton Hill won Division Two but were not promoted.

== League constitution and rules ==
The twelve teams that would take part in Division One were agreed at a meeting of the league on Wednesday 8 May 1895. The top eight finishers from the previous season (Hereford Thistle, St George, Warmley, Staple Hill, Gloucester, Eastville Rovers, Trowbridge Town and Clifton) were all automatically granted a place in the division for the 1895–96 campaign, while the bottom four finishers (Bedminster, Mangotsfield, Swindon Wanderers and Clevedon) would all need to apply for re-election to retain a spot in the top flight. Clevedon opted not to return to the league this season, but Barton Hill, Cardiff and St Paul's all submitted applications to the league. The result of the election is shown in the table below.

Team	Votes	
Bedminster	12	Elected to the league
Cardiff	11	Elected to the league
Swindon Wanderers	9	Elected to the league
St Paul's	9	Elected to the league
Mangotsfield	6	Initially unsuccessful, but later admitted following Hereford's withdrawal
Barton Hill	1	Not elected

A change to the way teams were ranked in the league table was agreed at a committee meeting in September 1895. Up to this point when teams finished level on points goal average was used as a tie-breaker, but for this season the use of goal average was abolished and any teams tied on points would play a test match at the end of the season to decide their ranking.

== Division One ==
Two new clubs joined Division One for this season, though the number of clubs remained at 12 after Hereford Thistle and Clevedon left.

- Cardiff
- St Paul's, promoted from Division Two

Pos	Team	Pld	W	D	L	GF	GA	GAv	Pts	Promotion or relegation
1	Warmley (C)	20	16	3	1	65	13	5.000	35	
2	Eastville Rovers	20	14	1	5	57	22	2.591	29 (Note: Eastville Rovers and Staple Hill were declared joint runners-up.)	Joint runners-up
3	Staple Hill	20	13	3	4	48	19	2.526	29	Joint runners-up
4	Trowbridge Town	20	13	1	6	50	31	1.613	27	
5	St George	20	10	4	6	47	38	1.237	24	
6	Clifton	20	8	3	9	44	50	0.880	17	2 points deducted for breach of rules
7	Gloucester (L)	20	6	4	10	29	42	0.690	16	Left league at end of season
8	Bedminster	20	6	2	12	36	41	0.878	14	
9	Swindon Wanderers (L)	20	4	4	12	22	57	0.386	12	Left league at end of season
10	Mangotsfield (R)	20	3	3	14	17	54	0.315	9	Not re-elected to 1st Division
11	St Paul's	20	2	2	16	12	60	0.200	6	
12	Cardiff (D)	0	0	0	0	0	0	—	0	Record expunged (Note: Cardiff were expelled in January 1896 for non-payment of fines, and their record was expunged.)

(C) Champions; (D) Disqualified; (L) Left league at the end of the season; (R) Relegated

=== Test match ===
Since Eastville Rovers and Staple Hill were tied on points at the end of the season a one-off test match was arranged between the two teams to decide which team would finish second and which finished third. The match ended in a 2–2 draw, leading to the two teams being declared joint runners-up.

30 April 1896 Test match	Staple Hill	2–2	Eastville Rovers	St George
18:30 GMT	Britton; Unknown scorer	Report	Unknown scorer; Unknown scorer	Referee: Mr A. Farrant

== Division Two ==
Four new teams joined Division Two this season, though the number of clubs remained at 11 after Mangotsfield Reserves, Waverley and Willsbridge left the league and St Paul's were elected to Division One. Willsbridge's withdrawal was due to them having no ground available on which to play their home games.

- Cumberland
- Eastville Wanderers
- Fishponds
- Frenchay

Pos	Team	Pld	W	D	L	GF	GA	GAv	Pts	Relegation
1	Barton Hill (C)	18	15	2	1	45	16	2.813	32 (Note: The tables as published at the time contained errors, hence the totals do not balance in some columns.)	
2	Fishponds	18	11	4	3	33	14	2.357	26	
3	St George Reserves (L)	18	11	3	4	52	22	2.364	25	Left league at end of season
4	Eastville Wanderers	18	10	2	6	34	23	1.478	22	
5	Eastville Rovers Reserves	18	8	4	6	43	31	1.387	20	
6	Cumberland (L)	18	7	3	8	47	35	1.343	17	Left league at end of season
7	Staple Hill Reserves	18	7	2	9	34	58	0.586	16	
8	Bedminster Reserves	18	6	1	11	35	38	0.921	13	
9	Warmley Reserves (L)	18	4	1	13	23	29	0.793	9	Left league at end of season
10	Clifton Reserves (L)	18	0	0	18	10	84	0.119	0	Left league at end of season
11	Frenchay (X)	0	0	0	0	0	0	—	0	Record expunged

Rules for classification: The system of using goal average to separate two teams tied on points was used up to and including the 1976–77 season. The points system: 2 points for a win, 1 point for a draw and 0 points for losing.
(C) Champions; (L) Left league at the end of the season; (X) Resigned from the league
