= 1901–02 Western Football League =

Western Football League
- Season: 1901–02
- Champions: Portsmouth (Division One); Bristol East (Division Two)

The 1901–02 season was the 10th in the history of the Western Football League.

Like the previous season, Portsmouth were the champions of Division One, and along with all the other members of Division One, also competed in the Southern League during this season. Portsmouth ultimately won both leagues, achieving a double. The Division Two champions for the third season running were Bristol East.

== Division One ==
One new club joined Division One, which remained at nine clubs after Bristol City joined the Football League.

- West Ham United

Pos	Team	Pld	W	D	L	GF	GA	GR	Pts	Result
1	Portsmouth	16	13	1	2	53	16	3.313	27	
2	Tottenham Hotspur	16	11	3	2	42	17	2.471	25	
3	Reading	16	7	3	6	29	22	1.318	17	
4	Millwall Athletic	16	8	1	7	25	29	0.862	17	
5	Bristol Rovers	16	8	0	8	25	31	0.806	16	
6	Southampton	16	7	1	8	30	28	1.071	15	
7	West Ham United	16	6	2	8	30	20	1.500	14	
8	Queens Park Rangers	16	5	1	10	17	43	0.395	11	
9	Swindon Town	16	0	2	14	8	53	0.151	2	Left league at end of season

== Division Two ==
Four new clubs joined Division Two, which was increased to nine clubs from eight after Bedminster St Francis and Fishponds left, and Weston (Bath) resigned during the previous season before playing a match.

- Bristol Rovers Reserves
- St George, rejoining the league after leaving in 1899.
- Swindon Town Reserves
- Trowbridge Town, rejoining the league after leaving in 1899.
- Cotham changed their name to Cotham Amateurs.

Pos	Team	Pld	W	D	L	GF	GA	GR	Pts	Result
1	Bristol East	16	13	1	2	55	11	5.000	27	
2	Bristol Rovers Reserves	16	10	3	3	54	18	3.000	23	
3	Paulton Rovers	16	9	3	4	51	29	1.759	21	
4	Staple Hill	16	9	3	4	30	24	1.250	21	
5	Swindon Town Reserves	16	7	2	7	44	35	1.257	16	
6	Trowbridge Town	16	6	3	7	30	43	0.698	15	
7	St George	16	6	2	8	29	36	0.806	14	
8	Weston-super-Mare	16	1	2	13	19	68	0.279	4	Left the league at the end of the season
9	Cotham Amateurs	16	1	1	14	23	71	0.324	3	

Rules for classification: The system of using goal average to separate two teams tied on points was used up to and including the 1976–77 season. The points system: 2 points for a win, 1 point for a draw and 0 points for losing.
