= 1893–94 Bristol & District League =

Bristol & District League
- Season: 1893–94
- Champions: Warmley (Division One); Warmley Res. (Division Two)

The 1893–94 season was the second in the history of the Bristol & District League, which was renamed the Western League in 1895. After a single division the previous season, a second division was formed, mostly of reserve teams from Division One clubs.

Warmley were the Division One champions again, having won the league in its initial season the previous year. Their reserve team won the new Division Two.

== Division One ==
Two new clubs joined Division One for this season, increasing the number of clubs from nine to ten after the resignation of Wells City.

- Gloucester
- Staple Hill

Pos	Team	Pld	W	D	L	GF	GA	GAv	Pts
1	Warmley (Note: Warmley were deducted two points for fielding a professional player)	18	12	5	1	32	13	2.462	27
2	St George	18	10	6	2	39	23	1.696	26
3	Trowbridge Town	18	9	4	5	54	33	1.636	22
4	Bedminster	18	9	2	7	41	36	1.139	20
5	Clevedon	18	7	5	6	34	40	0.850	19
6	Clifton	18	6	4	8	37	30	1.233	16
7	Staple Hill	18	5	5	8	23	33	0.697	15
8	Gloucester	18	6	1	11	32	45	0.711	13
9	Eastville Rovers	18	5	2	11	30	39	0.769	12
10	Mangotsfield	18	2	4	12	19	48	0.396	8

== Division Two ==
Ten teams formed the new Division Two, including seven reserve teams from Division One clubs.

Pos	Team	Pld	W	D	L	GF	GA	GAv	Pts	Relegation
1	Warmley reserves	18	16	1	1	66	12	5.500	33	
2	St George reserves	18	15	0	3	50	22	2.273	30	
3	Trowbridge Town reserves	18	11	1	6	47	22	2.136	23	Withdrew from league at the end of the season
4	St Paul's	18	9	3	6	44	51	0.863	21	
5	Barton Hill	18	7	4	7	40	32	1.250	18	
6	Bedminster reserves	18	6	3	9	35	42	0.833	15	
7	Mangotsfield reserves	18	6	1	11	26	41	0.634	13	
8	Clifton reserves	18	5	2	11	29	59	0.492	12	
9	Eastville Rovers reserves	18	4	2	12	23	45	0.511	10	
10	Waverley	18	2	4	12	22	53	0.415	8	

Rules for classification: 1) Points; 2) Goal average; 3) Number of goals scored. The points system: 2 points for a win, 1 point for a draw and 0 points for losing. The system of using goal average to separate two teams tied on points was used up to and including the 1976–77 season. The tables as published at the time contained errors, hence the totals do not balance in some columns.
