= Cardiff A.F.C. =

Former association football club in Wales

- Full name: Cardiff Association Football Club
- Founded: 1891
- Dissolved: 1896
- Ground: Grange Athletic Ground
- Chairman: John Sandiford
- Secretary: Harry Rose

Cardiff Association Football Club was an association football club from Cardiff, Wales, active in the 19th century.

== History ==
The club was founded in 1891, by John Sandiford (later chairman of the South Wales League) and Fred Ricketts, to provide an association side in the city; the only previous club of any note, Tredegarville, had not been active since 1872, and an attempt in 1887 had foundered.

The club was successful at a local level, and won the South Wales League in 1892–93, in doing so largely clearing the club's £40 debt from its first season. On the national scale, the club was less prominent - after withdrawing from the Welsh Cup in 1891–92 and 1892–93, the club finally made its debut with a 4–0 win over Mountain Ash in the first round in 1893–94, but lost 4–1 to Ironbridge in the second.

At the beginning of the 1894–95 season, the club merged with Cardiff Harlequins RFC, to form Cardiff Association Football and Harlequins' Athletic Club, often just referred to as Cardiff Association Football Club. However, the arrangement only lasted one season, the rugby playing members resurrecting Harlequins in late 1895, and the 1895–96 season was the AFC's last. The club joined the Western Football League for the season, and was considered a possible "surprise packet" with a rumoured strong team. but the season was derailed by confusion; W. H. Becker, the club's secretary at the start of the season, wrote to the League committee in September to withdraw the club from the competition, resulting in a match being postponed.

Although the club committee quickly had the supposed resignation overturned in short order, with a new secretary in place of Becker, the pressure of league matches meant the club was forced to scratch to Aberdare in the 1895–96 Welsh Cup. Worse, the club was fined for not turning up to a pair of fixtures in December 1895, and, after not paying the fine, was expelled from the league. The club's final match was a 4–0 home defeat to Warmley on New Year's Day 1896, which left the club 10th in the 12 club table, with 3 wins and 6 defeats from its 9 matches, before its results were expunged.

The name Cardiff Association was later revived by the Cardiff Y.M.C.A. football club.

== Ground ==
The club's first ground was at Tynycoed. Before the 1893–94 season the club moved to a new home, a cricket ground on top of Park Place, which the club christened St Andrew's. In August 1895 the club moved once more, to the Grange Athletic Ground, in Grangetown.
