= Mangotsfield F.C. =

Mangotsfield
- Full name: Mangotsfield Football Club
- Founded: 1888
- Dissolved: 1898

Mangotsfield Football Club was an association football club founded in 1888 in the village of Mangotsfield, Gloucestershire in England. They were a founder member of the Bristol & District League (later renamed the Western League) in 1892, where they played for six years before being disbanded in 1898.

Several attempts were made to reform the club, but none of these lasted for long, and the village remained without a regular football team until the foundation of Mangotsfield United, which was started by players left without a club when the last incarnation of Mangotsfield F.C. wound up its reserve team in 1951.

Mangotsfield were perennial losers, only managing to finish above the bottom two of their division once, when they finished third of seven teams in Division Two of the Western League at the end of the 1896–97 season.

== League history ==
Mangotsfield's six seasons of league football are listed below.

Season	Division	Position	W	D	L	F	A
Founder members of the Bristol & District League
1892–93	Bristol & District League	8 of 9	3	2	11	19	44
1893–94	Bristol & District League, Division One	10 of 10	2	4	12	19	48
1894–95	Bristol & District League, Division One	11 of 12	5	2	15	22	68
League renamed to Western League
1895–96	Western League, Division One	10 of 11	3	3	14	17	54
1896–97	Western League, Division Two	3 of 7	6	3	3	23	14
1897–98	Western League, Amateur Section	9 of 9	1	7	8	5	29
