= Joe Palmer (football manager) =

English football manager (1890–?)

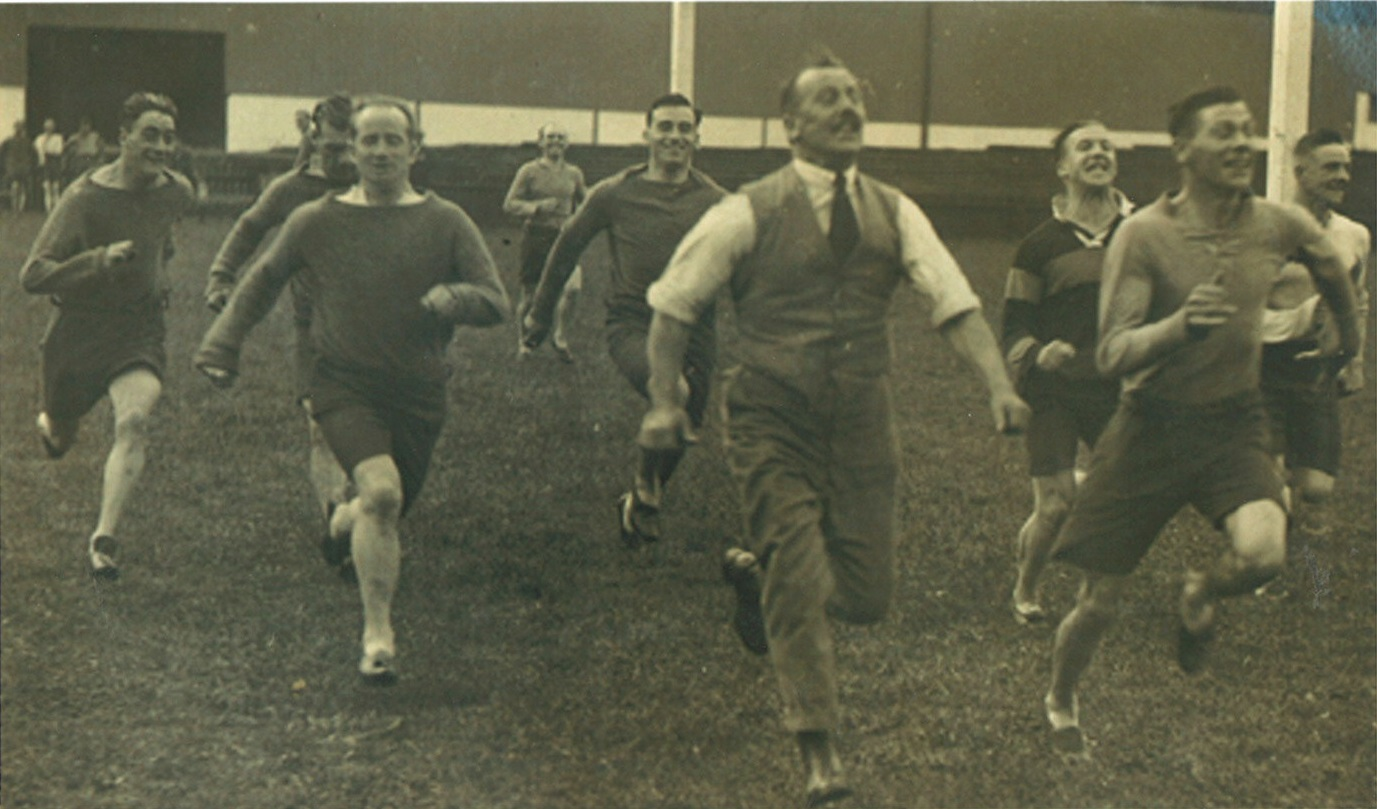
Palmer (in suit) leading a training session whilst manager of Bristol Rovers

Joe Palmer ( c. 1890, Yorkshire—?) was a football manager, who was the first to manage both Bristol City and Bristol Rovers.

Palmer was in charge of Bristol Rovers from May 1926 until April 1929, and was manager of Bristol City between 1919 and 1921. Between these spells he was trainer of Bradford Park Avenue.
