= South Wales League =

Defunct Welsh association football league

- Founded: 1890
- Folded: 1911
- Country: Wales
- Last champions: Tredegar (1910–11)
- Most championships: Treharris

The South Wales League was a football league in South Wales. It ran between 1890 and 1911, closing down in September 1911 before the start of the planned 1911–12 season.

== History ==
The league was formed in 1890, and its first matches were on 25 October. Treharris were the first champions after a disorganised first season which was concluded by the top three clubs playing off for the championship. The next three seasons were affected by unplayed matches; and at the completion of the 1893–94 season, the management committee announced the winding up of the league. For the next two seasons, the league trophy was played for as a junior cup competition. The league restarted for the 1896–97 season and grew in numbers, eventually adding a second division, which operated without promotion or relegation.

In 1904 another league formed in South Wales, the Rhymney Valley League, which later became the Glamorgan League, eventually becoming the Welsh Football League. The new league was effectively a junior league, with many South Wales League teams having teams in both leagues. During the 1909–10 season, some of the older teams left the league and the 1910–11 season was problematic. The league announced that 11 clubs would play the 1911–12 season, but the management committee cancelled the season in September 1911 with an initial plan to take a season off. The league never returned.

== Champions ==
- 1890–91: Treharris
- 1891–92: Treharris
- 1892–93: Cardiff A.F.C.
- 1893–94: Rogerstone
- 1894–95: League inactive
- 1895–96: League inactive
- 1896–97: Porth
- 1897–98: Rogerstone
- 1898–99: Aberdare
- 1899–1900: Aberdare
- 1900–01: Rogerstone
- 1901–02: Barry Unionist Athletic
- 1902–03: Aberaman
- 1903–04: Ebbw Vale
- 1904–05: Treharris
- 1905–06: Treharris
- 1906–07: Newport
- 1907–08: Treharris
- 1908–09: Ebbw Vale
- 1909–10: Cwm-parc & Treorchy United
- 1910–11: Tredegar

== See also ==
- Football in Wales
- Welsh football league system
- List of football clubs in Wales
