= Staple Hill F.C. =

Staple Hill
- Full name: Staple Hill Football Club
- Nickname(s): the Hillians
- Founded: 1889
- Dissolved: 1910
- Ground: Staple Hill Cricket Ground
- 1908–09: Western League Division Two, 5/12
1890s colours	1900s colours

Staple Hill F.C. was an English football club based in Staple Hill, Bristol.

== History ==
The earliest reference to the side is from the 1889–90 season and it joined the Bristol & District League in 1893–94, that league's second season, before it was renamed the Western League in 1895. Joint runners-up in Division One in 1895–96, Staple Hill were placed in Division Two of the league after a new professional section was formed in 1897. They won this division twice, in 1898–99 and 1906–07, and were runners-up on two other occasions, but were never promoted.

They were regular entrants in the FA Cup, and reached the first round proper in 1905–06 when they travelled to Manchester United's Bank Street ground, where they lost 7–2 in front of 7,560 spectators.

After finishing as champions the previous season, Staple Hill finished bottom of the Western League Division Two in 1907–08. On 29 June 1909, with Welsh clubs being admitted to the League, and the consequent increase in expenses overwhelming the already parlous club finances, the directors resolved to wind the club up. One cause was that the club was semi-professional, paying some players up to 15 shillings per match, which amateur players - despite their amateur status - also demanded, such payments being kept off the books to avoid scrutiny from the Gloucestershire Football Association.

The name was revived by a club in the 1950s which competed in local football until it was disbanded in 2004. A more recent club, Staple Hill Orient, competed in the Bristol and District Football League until 2016.

== League history ==
Staple Hill's 16 seasons of Western League football are listed below.

Season	Division	Position	W	D	L	F	A	Pts
Bristol & District League
1893–94	Bristol & District League, Division One	7 of 10	5	5	8	23	33	15
1894–95	Bristol & District League, Division One	4 of 12	11	4	7	56	38	26
League renamed to Western League
1895–96	Western League, Division One	2= of 11	13	3	4	38	19	29
1896–97	Western League, Division One	8 of 9	5	0	11	18	39	10
1897–98	Western League, Division One Amateur	2 of 9	11	1	4	38	15	23
1898–99	Western League, Division Two	1 of 8	11	1	2	55	15	23
1899–1900	Western League, Division Two	2 of 5	4	4	0	22	3	12
1900–01	Western League, Division Two	3 of 7	6	1	3	34	17	13
1901–02	Western League, Division Two	4 of 9	9	3	4	30	24	21
1902–03	Western League, Division Two	5 of 8	5	3	6	27	20	13
1903–04	Western League, Division Two	2 of 10	13	1	4	53	19	27
1904–05	Western League, Division Two	4 of 9	7	3	6	27	23	17
1905–06	Western League, Division Two	6 of 10	8	1	9	32	38	17
1906–07	Western League, Division Two	1 of 10	12	2	4	44	28	26
1907–08	Western League, Division Two	9 of 9	3	0	13	18	40	6
1908–09	Western League, Division Two	5 of 12	9	4	9	41	60	22

=== Reserves ===
For three seasons, Staple Hill entered a reserve team in Division Two of the Western League:

Season	Division	Position	W	D	L	F	A	Pts
Bristol & District League
1894–95	Bristol & District League, Division Two	10 of 11	4	1	15	32	79	9
League renamed to Western League
1895–96	Western League, Division Two	7 of 10	7	2	9	34	58	16
1896–97	Western League, Division Two	7 of 7	1	1	10	8	34	3

== Colours ==
The club earliest record of the club's colours are "maroon, striped with a trio of white stripes", adopted in before the 1894–95 season. By 1905 the club was wearing yellow and black striped shirts, white shorts, and yellow and black stockings, the yellow later described as being old gold.

== Ground ==
The club played at the Staple Hill Cricket Ground.
