= Hereford Thistle F.C. =

UK association football club

Hereford Thistle
- Full name: Hereford Thistle Football Club
- Nickname: the Thistle
- Founded: 1885
- Dissolved: 1899
- Ground: Barrack Ground
Home colours

Hereford Thistle Football Club was a football club based in Hereford, England.

== History ==
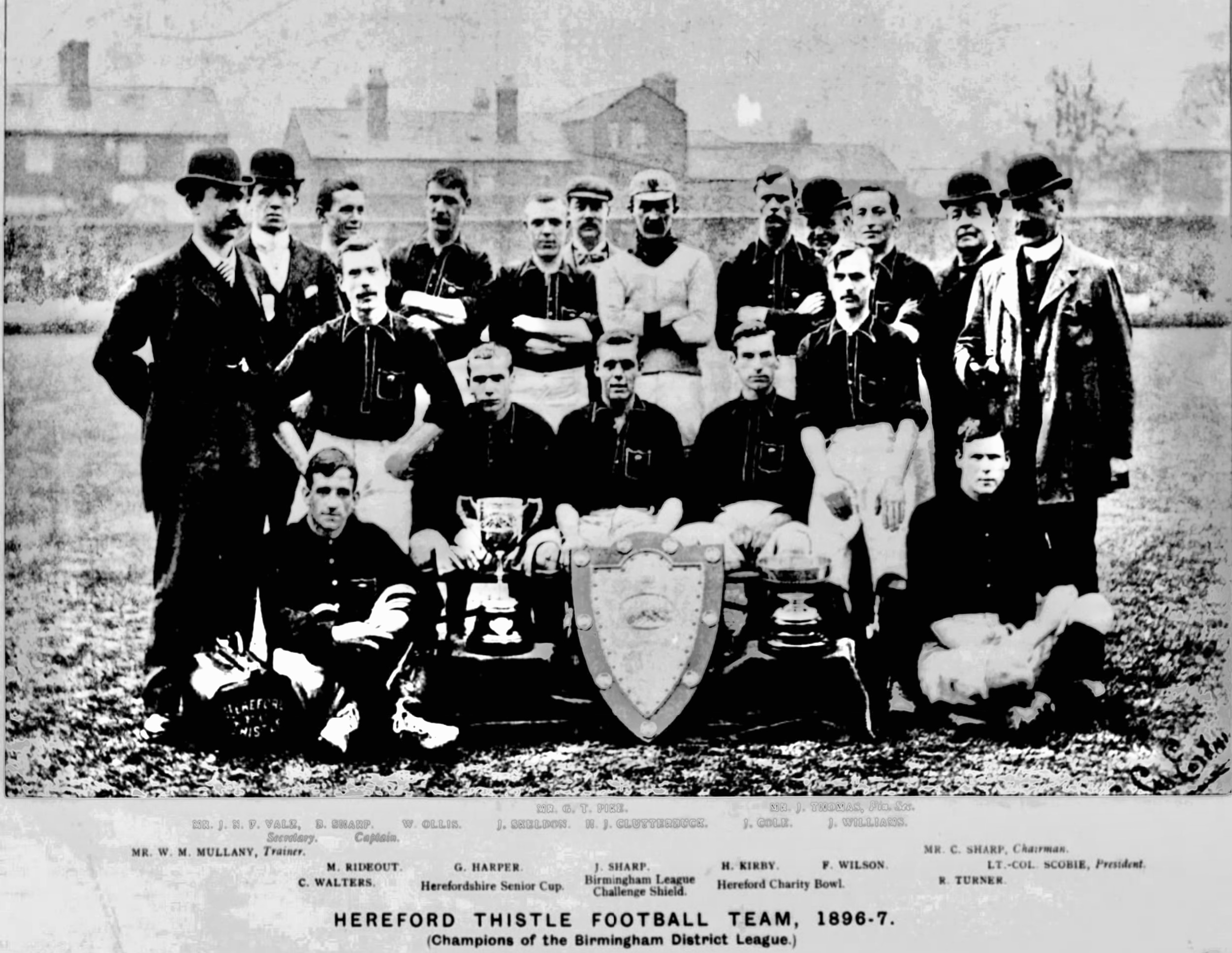
The 1896–97 side, with trophies for the Birmingham District League, Herefordshire Senior Cup, and Hereford Charity Bowk; Hereford Times, 15 May 1897

Founded in 1885, the club joined the Western League for the 1894–95 season (winning the division title) and moved to the Birmingham & District League the following year, winning the title in the 1896–97 season.

The club beat Hereford 3–0 in the Herefordshire Senior Cup final in 1894–95, and the same clubs reached the final in 1895–96 and 1896–97, the Thistle winning every time. The last fixture led to a dispute over the date, as the final was due to be held in March, but Hereford arranged a Birmingham league match for the final date, to which Thistle objected, having kept the date free.

The club disbanded after the 1898–99 season, the pressure of competing with reserve sides of professional clubs in the Birmingham & District League proving too much, and players generally joining Hereford F.C. as a result; the club had not been helped by the Mayor of Hereford vetoing a lottery through which the club was trying to raise funds. In May 1899, one of the Thistle's now-former players, George Harper, rescued two boys from drowning in a marl pit in Garrison Lane, Birmingham, for which he was awarded a medal by the Royal Humane Society.

== Colours ==
In 1894 the club adopted new colours of chocolate shirts with blue pockets.

== Ground ==
The club played at the Barrack Ground off Harold Street, using the Grapes Hotel as its correspondence address and for facilities.

== League records ==
Season	League	Pld	W	D	L	GF	GA	Pts	Pos
1894–95	Western Football League Division One	22	18	3	1	93	21	39	1/12
1895–96	Birmingham and District Football League	30	15	3	12	61	62	33	7/16
1896–97	Birmingham and District Football League	30	23	3	4	82	25	49	1/16
1897–98	Birmingham and District Football League	30	11	5	14	55	62	27	8/16
1898–99	Birmingham and District Football League	34	10	5	19	49	94	25	16/18

== Former players ==
1. Players that have played/managed in the Football League or any foreign equivalent to this level (i.e. fully professional league).
2. Players with full international caps.
3. Players that hold a club record or have captained the club.

- (England) Harry Crump
- (England) Jack Sharp, who played for the club in its Western League title season
- (England) Bert Sharp, who had started with the club as a boy, and who moved to Aston Villa in 1897
- (England) Billy Ollis
- (England) George Harper
