= 1897–98 Western Football League =

Western Football League
- Season: 1897–98
- Champions: Bristol City (Professional Section); Bedminster (Amateur Division One); Hanham (Amateur Division Two)

The 1897–98 season was the sixth in the history of the Western Football League.

For this season the league was restructured, with a new Professional Section being formed, taking five clubs from Division One and three new clubs joining. Division One and Division Two remained as the Amateur Section, with four clubs being promoted from Division Two to Division One, and several new clubs joining both divisions.

Bristol City were the champions of the new Professional Section, and also competed in the Southern League during this season, along with Swindon Town, Reading and Warmley. Division One of the Amateur Section was won by Bedminster, and the Division Two champions were newcomers Hanham. Many clubs left the Amateur Section at the end of the season, necessitating a merger of the two amateur divisions for the following season.

== Professional section ==
The three new clubs admitted to the league to play in this eight-club section were:

- Eastleigh Athletic
- Reading
- Swindon Town
- Bristol South End changed their name to Bristol City
- St George changed their name to Bristol St George

Pos	Team	Pld	W	D	L	GF	GA	GR	Pts	Result
1	Bristol City	14	11	1	2	51	16	3.188	23	Left to concentrate on the Southern League Division One
2	Swindon Town	14	9	1	4	32	15	2.133	19	
3	Reading	14	7	2	5	29	25	1.160	16	Left to concentrate on the Southern League Division One
4	Bristol St George	14	6	3	5	25	27	0.926	15	
5	Eastville Rovers	14	6	2	6	38	25	1.520	14	
6	Warmley	14	5	3	6	36	27	1.333	13	
7	Eastleigh Athletic	14	3	2	9	22	55	0.400	8	Joined Southern League Division One at the end of the season
8	Trowbridge Town	14	2	0	12	15	58	0.259	4	

== Amateur Division One ==
This ten-club division was a continuation of the old Division One, with six new clubs:

- Barton Hill, promoted from the old Division Two
- Eastville Wanderers, promoted from the old Division Two
- Fishponds, promoted from the old Division Two
- Mangotsfield, promoted from the old Division Two
- Midsomer Norton, also playing in the Somerset Senior League
- Radstock, also playing in the Somerset Senior League

Pos	Team	Pld	W	D	L	GF	GA	GR	Pts	Result
1	Bedminster (P)	16	15	0	1	65	11	5.909	30	Promoted to Professional Section
2	Staple Hill	16	11	1	4	38	15	2.533	23	
3	Fishponds	16	8	2	6	26	30	0.867	18	
4	Midsomer Norton	16	7	2	7	23	33	0.697	16	
5	Barton Hill	16	6	2	8	25	29	0.862	14	
6	Radstock	16	5	4	7	17	28	0.607	14	Left to concentrate on the Somerset Senior League
7	St Paul's	16	4	3	9	15	28	0.536	11	Left the league at the end of the season
8	Eastville Wanderers	16	4	1	11	15	26	0.577	9	Left the league at the end of the season
9	Mangotsfield	16	1	7	8	5	29	0.172	9	Left the league at the end of the season
10	Clifton	0	0	0	0	0	0	—	0	Resigned, record expunged (Note: Clifton resigned early in the season, and their record was expunged.)

(P) Promoted

== Amateur Division Two ==
This eight-club division was a continuation of the old Division Two, with seven new clubs:

- Barton Hill Reserves
- Cotham
- Eastville Wanderers Reserves
- Fishponds Reserves
- Hanham
- Royal Artillery (Horfield) (not to be confused with Royal Artillery Portsmouth F.C.)
- St Paul's Reserves

Pos	Team	Pld	W	D	L	GF	GA	GR	Pts	Result
1	Hanham	10	9	1	0	32	8	4.000	19 (Note: The tables as published at the time contained errors, hence the totals do not balance in some columns.)	
2	Cotham	10	8	0	2	32	16	2.000	16	
3	Barton Hill Reserves	10	4	2	4	20	14	1.429	10	Left the league at the end of the season
4	St Paul's Reserves	10	2	2	6	19	26	0.731	6	Left the league at the end of the season
5	Fishponds Reserves	10	1	1	8	10	25	0.400	3	Left the league at the end of the season
6	Bedminster Reserves	10	1	0	9	10	34	0.294	2	Left the league at the end of the season
7	Eastville Wanderers Reserves	0	0	0	0	0	0	—	0	Resigned, record expunged (Note: Eastville Wanderers Reserves and Royal Artillery (Horfield) resigned early in the season, and their records were expunged.)
8	Royal Artillery (Horfield)	0	0	0	0	0	0	—	0	Resigned, record expunged

Rules for classification: The system of using goal average to separate two teams tied on points was used up to and including the 1976–77 season. The points system: 2 points for a win, 1 point for a draw and 0 points for losing.
