= 1898–99 Western Football League =

Western Football League
- Season: 1898–99
- Champions: Swindon Town (Division One); Staple Hill (Division Two)

The 1898–99 season was the seventh in the history of the Western Football League.

For this season the league was restructured again after many clubs left the league. The Professional Section of last season was renamed Division One, and the two-division Amateur Section became one single division, Division Two.

Swindon Town were the champions of Division One, and also competed in the Southern League during this season, along with Southampton and Bedminster. Trowbridge Town and multiple champions Warmley also competed in both leagues, but both clubs disbanded during the season. The Division Two champions for the first time were Staple Hill.

== Division One ==
Two new clubs joined Division One, which was reduced to seven clubs from eight after Bristol City, Reading and Eastleigh left.

- Bedminster, promoted from the Amateur Section
- Southampton
- Eastville Rovers changed their name to Bristol Eastville Rovers, this being their only season under that name.

Pos	Team	Pld	W	D	L	GF	GA	GR	Pts	Result
1	Swindon Town	8	5	1	2	16	10	1.600	11	
2	Bristol St George	8	4	1	3	18	15	1.200	9	Left at the end of the season
3	Southampton	8	4	0	4	18	16	1.125	8	Left to concentrate on the Southern League Division One
4	Bristol Eastville Rovers	8	2	2	4	14	18	0.778	6	
5	Bedminster	8	2	2	4	9	16	0.563	6	
6	Warmley	0	0	0	0	0	0	—	0	Resigned, record expunged (Note: Trowbridge Town (October 1898) and Warmley (January 1899) resigned during the season, and their records were expunged. Trowbridge's record had been P5 W0 D0 L5 GF4 GA18 Pts0 and Warmley's was P5 W2 D0 L3 GF6 GA15 Pts4)
7	Trowbridge Town	0	0	0	0	0	0	—	0	Resigned, record expunged

== Division Two (Amateur) ==
This eight-club division was a merger of the old Amateur Section Divisions One and Two, containing the surviving clubs from both divisions, plus two new clubs:

- Bristol Amateurs
- Mount Hill

Pos	Team	Pld	W	D	L	GF	GA	GR	Pts	Result
1	Staple Hill	14	11	1	2	55	15	3.667	23 (Note: The tables as published at the time contained errors, hence the totals do not balance in some columns.)	
2	Fishponds	14	10	2	2	42	15	2.800	22	
3	Mount Hill	14	5	3	6	31	28	1.107	13	Left at the end of the season
4	Midsomer Norton	14	6	3	5	20	32	0.625	13 (Note: 2 points deducted?)	Left to concentrate on the Somerset Senior League
5	Bristol Amateurs	14	5	2	7	31	41	0.756	12	Left at the end of the season
6	Hanham	14	4	3	7	16	28	0.571	11	Left at the end of the season
7	Barton Hill	14	4	1	9	14	31	0.452	9	Left at the end of the season
8	Cotham	14	2	3	9	22	41	0.537	7	

Rules for classification: The system of using goal average to separate two teams tied on points was used up to and including the 1976–77 season. The points system: 2 points for a win, 1 point for a draw and 0 points for losing.
