= 1892–93 Bristol & District League =

Bristol & District League
- Season: 1892–93
- Champions: Warmley

The 1892–93 season was the first in the history of the Bristol & District League, which was renamed the Western League in 1895. Nine clubs formed the new league, which consisted of a single division. Wells City joined the league from the Somerset Senior League, of which they had been champions twice. Warmley were the first champions of the new league.

== Final table ==
Pos	Team	Pld	W	D	L	GF	GA	GR	Pts	Qualification
1	Warmley	16	11	3	2	72	19	3.789	25	
2	Trowbridge Town	16	10	4	2	66	17	3.882	24	
3	St George	16	9	5	2	36	22	1.636	23	
4	Bedminster	16	6	5	5	30	34	0.882	17	
5	Clevedon	16	6	4	6	25	36	0.694	16	
6	Eastville Rovers	16	6	3	7	36	40	0.900	15	
7	Clifton	16	4	2	10	27	61	0.443	10	
8	Mangotsfield	16	3	2	11	19	45	0.422	8	
9	Wells City	16	1	4	11	14	51	0.275	6	Left to rejoin the Somerset Senior League at end of season

Rules for classification: 2 points for a win, 1 point for a draw and 0 points for losing. The system of using goal average to separate two teams tied on points was used up to and including the 1976–77 season.

== Results ==
Home \ Away	BED	CLE	CLI	EAS	MAN	STG	TRO	WAR	WEL
Bedminster	—	1–1	1–1	5–0	3–1	1–1	4–0	2–0	1–1
Clevedon	2–3	—	4–1	1–0	0–1	1–2	2–2	1–1	3–1
Clifton		2–5	—	1–3	4–1	1–4	0–5	1–3	
Eastville Rovers	5–2	1–2	3–1	—	1–3	2–1	2–2	2–2	5–1
Mangotsfield	0–4	1–1		0–5	—	1–3	1–3	0–5	6–0
St George	3–1		3–2	2–0	2–1	—	0–0	2–2	2–2
Trowbridge Town	4–0	9–0	14–1	6–2	4–1	2–2	—		6–0
Warmley	9–0	9–1	8–0	8–2	7–1	6–3	1–4	—	6–0
Wells City	2–2	0–1	1–4	2–2	2–0		0–2	0–5	—

Source: British Newspaper Archive
Legend: Blue = home team win; Yellow = draw; Red = away team win.

== See also ==
- 1892–93 Eastville Rovers F.C. season
