= Treharris Athletic Western F.C. =

Association football club in Wales

Coordinates: 51°40′5.8″N 3°17′57.3″W

Treharris Athletic Western FC
- Full name: Treharris Athletic Western Football Club
- Nickname: The Lillywhites
- Founded: 1889
- Ground: Parc Taf Bargoed, Trelewis
- League: South Wales Premier League Championship Division
- 2025–26: South Wales Premier League Premier Division, 13th of 13 (relegated)
Home colours	Away colours

Treharris Athletic Western F.C. is a football club from Treharris in south Wales who play in the South Wales Premier League Championship Division. Their home ground is based in Parc Taf Bargoed in the neighbouring village, Trelewis.

== History ==
The original Treharris club was formed in 1889 as one of the earliest association football clubs based in south Wales and founding members of the South Wales League - a predecessor of the Welsh Football League - in 1890. The Treharris club were one of the foremost association football sides in south Wales in the two decades before the First World War, winning the inaugural South Wales League title in 1891, adding further triumphs in 1905 and 1906. They were also winners of the South Wales Senior Cup in 1904, 1906, 1907 and 1911.

Treharris were also founding members of the Rhymney Valley League in 1904, which was renamed as the Welsh Football League in 1913. They were Rhymney Valley League champions in 1910.

They joined the Western Football League Division Two in 1906 and were the Western League champions in 1910. Treharris joined the Southern Football League in 1910 and competed in division two for four seasons before the outbreak of the Great War.

After organised football resumed in 1919, the club was resumed as Treharris Athletic but did not join the English football pyramid, instead opting to play only in the Welsh Football League, where they generally played in the second tier during the 1920s and 1930s until the Second World War put an end to organised football for six years. When the Welsh League resumed in 1945. In 2008, Treharris Athletic incorporated Western Hotel FC into the club and were renamed Treharris Athletic Western FC.

The home of football in Treharris since 1900 had been The Athletic Ground. However, the ground was condemned in 2016 and for two seasons Treharris were forced to play at different grounds including the Centre for Sporting Excellence in Ystrad Mynach and the Welfare Ground in Fochriw. At the start of the 2018–19 season, Treharris moved into their new permanent home on the former ground of the now defunct Trelewis Welfare Football Club in Parc Taf Bargoed on the site of the former Deep Navigation Colliery.

== Honours ==
South Wales League

- Champions: 1890–91, 1904–05, 1905–06

Welsh Football League

- Champions: 1909–10

South Wales FA Senior Cup

- Winners: 1903–04, 1905–06, 1906–07, 1910–11

Western Football League

- Champions: 1909–10
