= List of Bristol Rovers F.C. seasons =

This article lists all the Bristol Rovers Football Club seasons from 1892–93 up to 2024–25.

Bristol Rovers' league progress from joining the Football league until the present day

== Seasons ==
Legend
Background colours		Cups		Other competitions	
1	Champions	PR	Preliminary round	AIC	Anglo-Italian Cup
2	Runners-up	Q[n]	[n]th qualifying round	ASC	Anglo-Scottish Cup
3	Third place	Int	Intermediate round	D3SC	Division 3 (South) Cup
↑	Promoted	R[n]	[n]th round	FAT	FA Trophy
↓	Relegated	Group	Group stage	FMC	Full Members Cup
		QF	Quarter-finalists	GC	Gloucestershire Cup winners
		SF	Semi-finalists	PO	Play-offs
		RU	Runners-up	WC	Watney Cup
		W	Champions		
		(S)	Southern region		

Season	Division	League							FA Cup^{[A]}	EFL Cup^{[A]}	EFL Trophy^{[A]}	Other	Top League Goalscorer	
Season	Division	Pos	W	D	L	F	A	Pts	FA Cup^{[A]}	EFL Cup^{[A]}	EFL Trophy^{[A]}	Other	Player(s)	Goals
1883–84	None													
1884–85	None													
1885–86	None													
1886–87	None													
1887–88	None													
1888–89	None											GC		
1889–90	None													
1890–91	None													
1891–92	None													
1892–93	Bristol & District	6	6	3	7	36	40	15					Bill Rogers	9
1893–94	Bristol & District D1	9	5	2	11	30	30	12					Bob Horsey	8
1894–95	Bristol & District D1	6	10	4	8	46	40	24					Bob Horsey	17
1895–96	Western D1	2	14	1	5	57	22	29	PR				Howard Gallier	15
1896–97	Western D1	5	7	2	7	25	23	14^{[B]}	Q3				Howard Gallier	8
1897–98	B'ham & District	3	20	4	6	84	34	44	Q5				John McLean	11
1898–99	B'ham & District	4	20	5	9	132	49	46	Q3				Tommy McCairns	32
1899–1900	Southern D1	10	11	3	14	46	55	25	Q4				Jack Jones	12
1900–01	Southern D1	7	14	4	10	46	35	32	R1				Jack Jones	11
1901–02	Southern D1	9	12	5	13	43	39	29	R2				Jack Jones	14
1902–03	Southern D1	5	13	8	9	46	34	34	Int			GC	James Howie	11
1903–04	Southern D1	3	17	8	9	64	42	42	Int				Billy Beats	18
1904–05	Southern D1	1	20	8	6	74	36	48	R1			GC	Andrew Smith	19
1905–06	Southern D1	8	15	5	14	56	56	35	R1				Jack Lewis	13
1906–07	Southern D1	14	12	9	17	55	54	33	R3				Jack Young	14
1907–08	Southern D1	6	16	10	12	59	56	42	R3				John Roberts	14
1908–09	Southern D1	5	17	9	14	60	63	43	R1				Fred Corbett	19
1909–10	Southern D1	13	16	10	16	37	48	42	R2				Fred Corbett	13
1910–11	Southern D1	16	10	10	18	42	55	30	R1				Billy Peplow	9
1911–12	Southern D1	17	9	13	16	41	62	31	R1				Billy Peplow; George Richards	7
1912–13	Southern D1	16	12	9	17	55	64	33	R3				James Brogan	11
1913–14	Southern D1	17	10	11	17	46	67	31	R1				Ellis Crompton	13
1914–15	Southern D1	16	14	3	21	53	75	31	R1				George Davison	15
League football suspended during World War I
1919–20	Southern D1	17	11	13	18	61	78	35	R1				Stephen Sims	9
1920–21	Division 3	10	18	7	17	68	57	43	R1				Syd Leigh	21
1921–22	Division 3(S)	14	14	10	18	52	67	38	Q6				Syd Leigh	15
1922–23	Division 3(S)	13	13	16	13	35	36	42	Q6				Fred Lunn	10
1923–24	Division 3(S)	9	15	13	14	52	46	43	Q5				Wilkie Phillips	23
1924–25	Division 3(S)	17	12	13	17	42	49	37	R1				Wilkie Phillips; Ernie Whatmore	9
1925–26	Division 3(S)	19	15	6	21	66	69	36	R1				Jonah Wilcox	19
1926–27	Division 3(S)	10	16	9	17	78	80	41	R3				Bill Culley	26
1927–28	Division 3(S)	19	14	4	24	69	93	32	R2				Arthur Ormston	15
1928–29	Division 3(S)	19	13	7	22	60	79	33	R2				Jack Phillips	13
1929–30	Division 3(S)	20	11	8	23	69	93	30	R3				Jack Phillips	24
1930–31	Division 3(S)	15	16	8	18	75	92	40	R4				Arthur Attwood	24
1931–32	Division 3(S)	18	13	8	21	65	92	34	R2				Thomas Cook	17
1932–33	Division 3(S)	9	15	14	13	61	56	44	R3				Viv Gibbins	15
1933–34	Division 3(S)	7	20	11	11	77	47	51	R2				Jimmy McCambridge	17
1934–35	Division 3(S)	8	17	10	15	73	77	44	R3			D3SC: W	George McNestry	19
1935–36	Division 3(S)	17	14	9	19	69	95	37	R3				Jack Woodman	15
1936–37	Division 3(S)	15	16	4	22	71	80	36	R3				Harold Houghton	14
1937–38	Division 3(S)	15	13	13	16	46	61	39	R1				Albert Iles	14
1938–39	Division 3(S)	22^{[C]}	10	13	19	55	61	33	R2				Frank Curran	21
League football suspended during World War II
1945–46	League suspended								R2					
1946–47	Division 3(S)	14	16	8	18	59	69	40	R1				Fred Leamon	13
1947–48	Division 3(S)	20	13	8	21	71	75	34	R4				Vic Lambden	11
1948–49	Division 3(S)	5	19	10	13	61	51	48	R1				Vic Lambden	13
1949–50	Division 3(S)	9	19	5	18	51	51	43	R1				Bill Roost	13
1950–51	Division 3(S)	6	20	15	11	64	42	55	QF				Vic Lambden	20
1951–52	Division 3(S)	7	20	12	14	89	53	52	R4				Vic Lambden	29
1952–53	Division 3(S) ↑	1	26	12	8	92	46	64	R3				Geoff Bradford	33
1953–54	Division 2	9	14	16	12	64	58	44	R3				Geoff Bradford	21
1954–55	Division 2	9	19	7	16	75	70	45	R4				Geoff Bradford	26
1955–56	Division 2	6	21	6	15	84	70	48	R4				Geoff Bradford	25
1956–57	Division 2	9	18	9	15	81	67	45	R4				Dai Ward	19
1957–58	Division 2	10	17	8	17	85	80	42	QF				Geoff Bradford	20
1958–59	Division 2	6	18	12	12	80	64	48	R3				Dai Ward	26
1959–60	Division 2	9	18	11	13	72	78	47	R4				Alfie Biggs	21
1960–61	Division 2	17	15	7	20	73	92	37	R3	R3			Peter Hooper	20
1961–62	Division 2 ↓	21	13	7	22	53	81	33	R3	R2			Bobby Jones	13
1962–63	Division 3	19	15	11	20	70	88	41	R1	R4			Keith Williams	17
1963–64	Division 3	12	19	8	19	97	79	46	R4	R3			Alfie Biggs	30
1964–65	Division 3	6	20	15	11	82	58	55	R3	R2			Ian Hamilton	20
1965–66	Division 3	16	14	14	18	64	64	42	R1	R2			Harold Jarman	16
1966–67	Division 3	5	20	13	13	76	67	53	R3	R1			Alfie Biggs	23
1967–68	Division 3	15	17	9	20	72	78	43	R3	R1			Ray Mabbutt	11
1968–69	Division 3	16	16	11	19	63	71	43	R5	R1			Harold Jarman	14
1969–70	Division 3	3	20	16	10	80	59	56	R2	R1			Robin Stubbs	15
1970–71	Division 3	6	19	13	14	69	50	51	R2	QF			Robin Stubbs	17
1971–72	Division 3	6	21	12	13	75	56	54	R3	QF			Bruce Bannister	12
1972–73	Division 3	5	20	13	13	77	56	53	R1	R4		WC: W	Bruce Bannister	25
1973–74	Division 3 ↑	2	22	17	7	65	33	61	R3	R1			Alan Warboys	22
1974–75	Division 2	19	12	11	19	42	64	35	R4	R2			Alan Warboys	11
1975–76	Division 2	18	11	16	15	38	50	38	R3	R3			Bruce Bannister	13
1976–77	Division 2	15	12	13	17	53	68	37	R3	R1			Alan Warboys	11
1977–78	Division 2	18	13	12	17	61	77	38	R5	R1		ASC: group	Paul Randall	20
1978–79	Division 2	16	14	10	18	48	60	38	R5	R1		ASC: group	Paul Randall	13
1979–80	Division 2	19	11	13	18	50	64	35	R3	R1			Stewart Barrowclough	12
1980–81	Division 2 ↓	22	5	13	24	34	65	23	R4	R3			Gary Mabbutt; Aidan McCaffery	5
1981–82	Division 3	15	18	9	19	58	65	61^{[D]}	R1	R2			Paul Randall	12
1982–83	Division 3	7	22	9	15	84	58	75	R2	R2			Paul Randall	20
1983–84	Division 3	5	22	13	11	68	54	79	R2	R2	SF (S)		Archie Stephens	13
1984–85	Division 3	6	21	12	13	66	48	75	R3	R2	R1		Paul Randall	18
1985–86	Division 3	16	14	12	20	51	75	54	R4	R2	Group		Trevor Morgan	16
1986–87	Division 3	19	13	12	21	49	75	51	R1	R1	Group		David Mehew	10
1987–88	Division 3	8	18	12	16	68	56	66	R3	R1	Group		Gary Penrice	18
1988–89	Division 3	5	19	17	10	67	51	74	R2	R1	QF (S)	PO: RU	Gary Penrice	20
1989–90	Division 3 ↑	1	26	15	5	71	35	93	R1	R1	RU		David Mehew	18
1990–91	Division 2	13	15	13	18	56	59	58	R3	R1		FMC: R2	Carl Saunders	16
1991–92	Division 2	13	16	14	16	60	63	62	R4	R3		FMC: R1	Carl Saunders; Devon White	10
1992–93	Division 1 ↓	24	10	11	25	55	87	41	R3	R2		AIC: group	John Taylor	14
1993–94	Division 2	8	20	10	16	60	59	70	R1	R1	R2		John Taylor	22
1994–95	Division 2	4	22	16	8	70	40	82	R3	R1	QF (S)	PO: RU	Paul Miller	16
1995–96	Division 2	10	20	10	16	57	60	70	R1	R2	RU (S)		Marcus Stewart	21
1996–97	Division 2	17	15	11	20	47	50	56	R1	R1	R1		Peter Beadle	12
1997–98	Division 2	5	20	10	16	70	64	70	R3	R1	QF (S)	PO: SF	Barry Hayles	23
1998–99	Division 2	13	13	17	16	65	56	56	R5	R1	R1		Jamie Cureton	25
1999–2000	Division 2	7	23	11	12	69	45	80	R1	R2	QF (S)		Jamie Cureton; Jason Roberts	22
2000–01	Division 2 ↓	21	12	15	19	53	57	51	R1	R3	QF (S)		Nathan Ellington	15
2001–02	Division 3	23	11	12	23	40	60	45	R4	R2	SF (S)		Nathan Ellington	15
2002–03	Division 3	20	12	15	19	50	57	51	R2	PR	R1		Giuliano Grazioli	11
2003–04	Division 3	15	14	13	19	50	61	55	R1	R1	R1		Paul Tait	14
2004–05	League 2	12	13	21	12	60	57	60	R1	R2	RU (S)		Junior Agogo	19
2005–06	League 2	12	17	9	20	59	67	60	R2	R1	R1		Richard Walker	20
2006–07	League 2 ↑	6	20	12	14	49	42	72	R4	R1	RU	PO: W	Richard Walker	12
2007–08	League 1	16	12	17	17	45	53	53	QF	R2	R2		Rickie Lambert	13
2008–09	League 1	11	17	12	17	79	61	63	R1	R1	R1		Rickie Lambert	29
2009–10	League 1	11	19	5	22	59	70	62	R1	R2	R1		Jo Kuffour	14
2010–11	League 1 ↓	22	11	12	23	48	82	45	R1	R1	SF (S)		Will Hoskins	17
2011–12	League 2	13	15	12	19	60	70	57	R3	R2	R1		Matt Harrold	16
2012–13	League 2	14	16	12	18	60	69	60	R1	R1	R1		Tom Eaves	7
2013–14	League 2 ↓	23	12	14	20	43	54	50	R3	R1	R1		John-Joe O'Toole	13
2014–15	Conference Prem ↑	2	25	16	5	73	34	91	R1			PO: W FAT: R1	Matty Taylor	20
2015–16	League 2 ↑	3	26	7	13	77	46	85	R1	R1	QF (S)		Matty Taylor	27
2016–17	League 1	10	18	12	16	68	70	66	R2	R2	Group		Matty Taylor	16
2017–18	League 1	13	16	11	19	60	76	59	R1	R3	Group		Ellis Harrison	14
2018–19	League 1	15	13	15	18	47	50	54	R1	R2	SF		Jonson Clarke-Harris	11
2019–20^{[E]}	League 1	14	12	9	14	38	49	45	R3	R2	R3		Jonson Clarke-Harris	13
2020–21	League 1 ↓	24	10	8	28	40	70	38	R3	R1	R3		Luke Leahy	8
2021–22	League 2 ↑	3	23	11	12	71	49	80	R3	R1	Group		Aaron Collins	16
2022–23	League 1	17	14	11	21	58	73	53	R2	R1	QF		Aaron Collins	16
2023–24	League 1	15	16	9	21	52	68	57	R3	R1	R2		Chris Martin	16
2024–25	League 1 ↓	22	12	7	27	44	76	43	R3	R1	Group		Ruel Sotiriou	6

=== Notes ===
A. EFL Cup, EFL Trophy and Post-1900 FA Cup results from the Football Club History Database, pre-1900 FA Cup results are from The FA.
B. Eastville Rovers had two league points deducted in 1896–97 for paying a player.
C. Club was re-elected to the Football League after finishing bottom of Division 3 (South).
D. Two league points deducted in 1981–82 for fielding an unregistered player.
E. The 2019–20 season was curtailed due to the COVID-19 pandemic. The season's final standings were decided on points per game with Rovers scoring 1.29ppg.

== Bibliography ==
- Byrne, Stephen; Jay, Mike (2003). Bristol Rovers Football Club – The Definitive History 1883–2003. Stroud: Tempus. ISBN 0-7524-2717-2.
