= History of Bristol Rovers F.C. =

History of an English football club

The history of Bristol Rovers F.C., an English football club based in Bristol, England, covers their entire history from their formation in 1883 as the Black Arabs until the present day.

== The early years (1883–1892) ==
Black Arabs 1883–1884 season
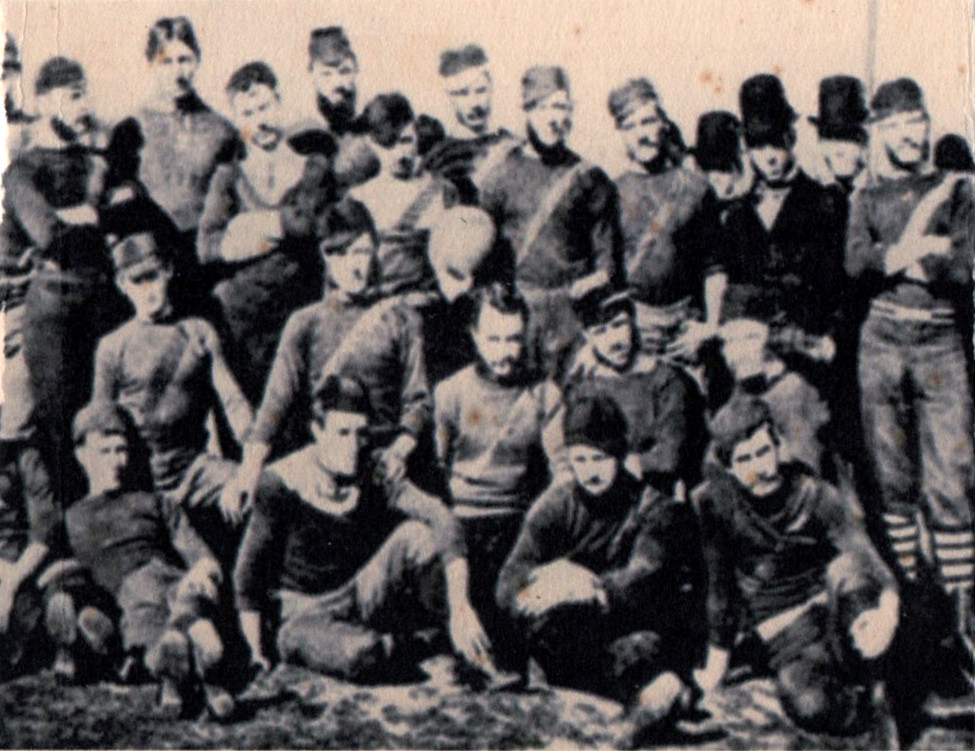
- The Black Arabs in February 1884
Home colours

Teacher training establishments were considered a nursery of footballing talent and the teaching profession played a major but under-recognised role in the founding and rapid growth of association football with teachers spreading enthusiasm and organising school teams and local clubs. In September 1883, in a meeting organised by school teacher Bill Somerton at the Eastville Restaurant on Stapleton Road in Bristol, the foundation was laid for the team that would go on to be known as Bristol Rovers.

The area was at the time a rugby stronghold, and this led the fledgling club to be named after the local rugby side. The Black Arabs season 1883–84 was the first played by the team. This was the only season that they used the name Black Arabs, the name being changed to Eastville Rovers for the following season. The Black Arabs were founded by W.E. Braund, and were captained by Henry Martin. The team originally wore a predominantly black kit, from which they took their name. A gold sash was later added to the black shirts, and the black and gold colour scheme went on to become a recurrent theme in the team's away kits in the 21st century.

Black Arabs F.C. were not part of a league, and only played friendly matches during their first season. There is no record of the goalscorers from this season, and some match results have also been lost over time. The Black Arabs played their home games on Purdown in Bristol, but found fixtures hard to come by in their early days due to a dearth of association football teams in the Bristol area. A total of ten fixtures were eventually arranged for the inaugural season: two against Wotton-under-Edge, two against Warmley, four against Bristol Wagon Works and Two against Right & Might. The club's first fixture was played on 1 December 1883 when the Black Arabs took to the field in a friendly match against Wotton-under-Edge, a team based in Gloucestershire. The game ended in a 6–0 defeat for the Bristolians, and although no team line-ups or detailed match reports have survived, a brief paragraph describing the game appeared in the Dursley Gazette two days later.

Football: Wotton-under-Edge v Black Arabs (Bristol). A match under association rules has been played at Wotton-under-Edge between these clubs, resulting in the defeat of the visiting team. The home team were in every point superior to their antagonists and after a one-sided game Wotton were declared victors by six goals to nil.

— Dursley Gazette, 3 December 1883, reproduced in Byrne & Jay 2003. –A report of the Black Arabs' first match

During that first season the team came to be known by the nickname The Purdown Poachers, after the location of their home pitch, and despite the fact they only played there for a single season the moniker stuck for some time.

In November 1884 the name of the club was changed to Eastville Rovers, giving them an identity in their own right, rather than being named after a rugby club. The change in name to one based on a geographical location came about in an effort to broaden the appeal of the club and to draw players from a wider area. The team also moved to a new pitch for the 1884–85 season. Known as Three Acres, the open field with no changing facilities was in the Ashley Down area of Bristol. The precise location of the ground is not known, but it is thought to have lain somewhere between Muller Road and the County Cricket Ground. The team moved to a third new home in as many seasons when they began the first of two spells playing at Durdham Down in 1885, remaining here for six seasons.

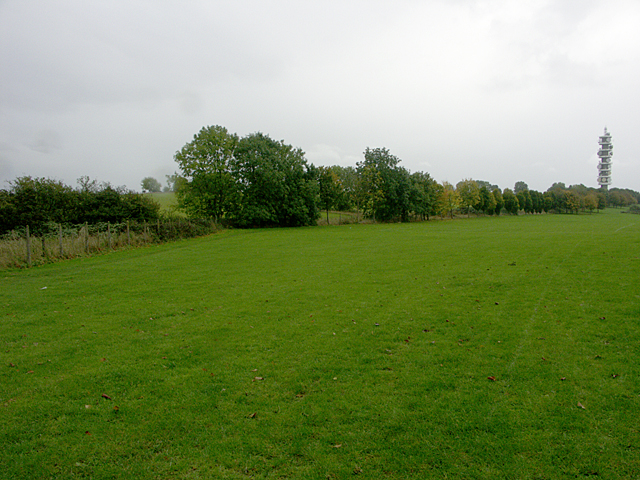
Purdown, seen here in 2005, was the first home of Bristol Rovers

It was not until 14 January 1888 that Eastville Rovers took part in a formal competition for the first time. In a meeting between Rovers and fellow Bristol-based football teams Clifton Association, Globe, Southville, St George, St Agnes and St Simon held in September 1887 the Gloucestershire Cup was established, a single-elimination knockout tournament open to teams in the Bristol and Gloucestershire area. The competition began the following January and Rovers took to the field against Clifton Association at Bell Hill, St George. Unfortunately for Rovers, they lost a player to injury just two minutes into the game, and in the era before the introduction of substitutes they were forced to play almost the entire match with ten men. They lost the game 4–1, with outside-left Bill Bush taking the honour of becoming Eastville Rovers' first goalscorer in a competitive match.

The following season, on 6 April 1889, Rovers won their first ever trophy by beating Warmley in the final of the second running of the Gloucestershire Cup. A single goal by Bill Perrin, scored during the second half, was enough to earn Rovers the silverware.

Eastville Rovers continued to play mainly friendly matches for the next few years, as well as taking part in the Gloucestershire Cup each year. In 1890, Rovers again reached the final of this competition, losing 7–2 to Clifton Association in a game that was refereed by noted cricketer W. G. Grace.

Rovers moved to their fourth home in 1891, having negotiated a fee of £8 a year to allow them to play at the Schoolmasters Cricket Ground, Horfield. The deal also meant that the football club would be responsible for the upkeep of the fencing at the ground and they also had to provide a groundsman.

Honours

- Gloucestershire Cup — 1888–89

== The Western League era (1892–1899) ==
Eastville Rovers league record
Season	League	Position
1892–93	Bristol & District League	6th of 9
1893–94	Bristol & District League	9th of 10
1894–95	Bristol & District League	6th of 12
1895–96	Western League Division 1	=2nd of 11
1896–97	Western League Division 1	5th of 9
Bristol Eastville Rovers league record
1897–98; 1897–98	Birmingham & District League; Western League Professional Section	3rd of 16; 5th of 8
1898–99; 1898–99	Birmingham & District League; Western League Professional Section	4th of 19; 4th of 5

1892 was a major landmark in the history of the club, with Eastville Rovers joining an organised league for the first time. Rovers became a founding member of the Bristol & District League (later to become the Western Football League), and their first league game was played on 1 October 1892 against Mangotsfield F.C.. Although it was officially a home game for Rovers, the game was played at Mangotsfield and Rovers were defeated by 3 goals to 1. This first season ended with Rovers placed sixth of the nine teams in the league, with six wins, two draws and eight defeats from the sixteen games played.

The 1893–94 season was a poor one, with Rovers finishing 11th out of 12 teams, with only Mangotsfield F.C. below them in the league. Things improved in 1894–95 however with a 6th-place finish. This season saw Rovers move to their fifth home, locating themselves at a ground referred to sometimes as Rudgeway and at other times as Ridgeway in the Fishponds area of the city. On 22 September 1894 the first meeting of the two teams that went on to become Bristol Rovers and Bristol City took place. Bristol South End beat Eastville Rovers 2–1 at St. John's Lane in Bedminster.

For the 1895–96 season the Bristol & District League had renamed itself the Western League and had expanded to two divisions. Eastville Rovers were allocated two places in the league, one in the Division One for the first team and one in Division Two for the second XI. Rovers' first game in the Western League, like their first game in the Bristol & District League three years earlier, was against Mangotsfield. This time, however, the result was a win to Rovers, with the game finishing 4–0. Rovers ended the season tied for second place in the league with Staple Hill, and after a play-off game between them ended in a 2–2 draw the teams were declared joint runners-up.

5 October 1895 saw the first appearance in the FA Cup, although this ended in a 2–0 defeat at the hands of Warmley, and on 25 January 1896 the first competitive match between Eastville Rovers and Bristol South End took place, with Rovers winning 4–0 in the Gloucestershire Cup. In the 1896–97 FA Cup, after having beaten Newbury and Bristol St. George, Rovers were drawn away to Royal Artillery Portsmouth. Rovers decided though that they had no hope of winning the game and decided to save the travel expenses by withdrawing from the competition. During the 1896–97 season, Rovers purchased the Eastville ground from Bristol Harlequins rugby club on 26 March 1897 and on 3 April played their first game there against Aston Villa. This would remain their home for almost 100 years.

During the last few years of the 19th century, Eastville Rovers had gradually become known as Bristol Eastville Rovers, and on 7 February 1899 the club officially changed its name to Bristol Rovers.

== The Southern League years (1899–1920) ==
Season	League	Position
1899–1900	Southern League Division 1	11th of 15
1900–01	Southern League Division 1	7th of 15
1901–02	Southern League Division 1	9th of 16
1902–03	Southern League Division 1	5th of 16
1903–04	Southern League Division 1	3rd of 18
1904–05	Southern League Division 1	1st of 18
1905–06	Southern League Division 1	8th of 18
1906–07	Southern League Division 1	14th of 20
1907–08	Southern League Division 1	6th of 20
1908–09	Southern League Division 1	5th of 21
1909–10	Southern League Division 1	13th of 22
1910–11	Southern League Division 1	16th of 20
1911–12	Southern League Division 1	17th of 20
1912–13	Southern League Division 1	16th of 20
1913–14	Southern League Division 1	17th of 20
1914–15	Southern League Division 1	16 of 20
1919–20	Southern League Division 1	17th of 22

For the 1899–1900 season the newly renamed Bristol Rovers were admitted to the Southern League. During this first season in the Southern League, Rovers faced a Sheppey United team that featured future Huddersfield Town and Arsenal manager Herbert Chapman.

On 17 November 1900 Rovers faced Weymouth in an FA Cup qualifying match. With the score 5–1 at half time, Rovers went on to score ten goals in the second half, recording a 15–1 victory, a club record for the biggest win in a competitive first team match that still stands today. That win helped Jack Jones towards a total of nine goals in the 1900–01 FA Cup campaign, which is the most FA Cup goals scored by a Rovers player in a single season.

During the 1902–03 season Rovers won the Gloucestershire Cup for the second time after beating Bristol City 4–2 in the second replay.

Another landmark was reached during 1904–05 when Jack Lewis was called up to the Welsh national team, becoming the first Bristol Rovers player to receive an international cap while still at the club. 1904–05 was a successful campaign for Rovers, the season providing the first league title and third Gloucestershire Cup for the club.

Only six league seasons were played during this decade due to World War I. 1909–10 marked the beginning of a disappointing run of league performances, with the team never finishing better than 13th in the Southern League in the six seasons before the war. During the 1909–10 FA Cup campaign Rovers were drawn at home to Barnsley after having previously beaten Grimsby Town, but Barnsley offered Rovers £500 to switch the tie to Oakwell where Barnsley won 4–0. On 27 April 1910, in a match against New Brompton (now known as Gillingham), Fred Corbett scored his 50th Southern League goal for Rovers, becoming the only player to score 50 goals in the Southern League for the club.

Although one season of league football was played after the outbreak of war, the 1914–15 would be the last season of competitive football played by Rovers until 1919.

Honours

- Southern League Division 1 — 1904–05
- Gloucestershire Cup — 1902–03 and 1904–05
- Gloucestershire Cup — 1913–14

== The 1920s ==
Season	League	Position
1920–21	Football League Division 3	10th of 22
1921–22	Football League Division 3 (South)	14th of 22
1922–23	Football League Division 3 (South)	13th of 22
1923–24	Football League Division 3 (South)	9th of 22
1924–25	Football League Division 3 (South)	17th of 22
1925–26	Football League Division 3 (South)	19th of 22
1926–27	Football League Division 3 (South)	10th of 22
1927–28	Football League Division 3 (South)	19th of 22
1928–29	Football League Division 3 (South)	19th of 22

1920–21 club colours

On 18 May 1920 a meeting was held between representatives of the Southern League and The Football League and it was decided to move all of the Southern League teams into the new third division of the Football League, which up to this point had consisted of two divisions. As a result, Rovers lined up against Millwall on 28 August 1920 for their first match as a football league side, which they lost 2–0. This season also saw Rovers change their team colours from the black and white stripes that had been used since 1899 to white jerseys with blue shorts.

The first Rovers player to be sent off in the Football League was Bill Panes, who was expelled on 4 February 1922 during a game with Luton Town at Eastville.

Attendances were high during this period. On several occasions during this decade, matches between the two Bristol clubs attracted crowds of 30,000 spectators. Even reserve team matches were well attended; a Southern League game against Bristol City played in April 1923 at Ashton Gate attracted 7,000 fans.

In September 1922, an Egyptian engineering student at the University of Bristol called Mahmoud Mokhtar Sakr had an unsuccessful trial during a reserve game with Bristol Rovers. Although he did not earn a professional contract in Bristol, or at Tranmere Rovers where he also had a trial, he went on to become a six-time winner of the Egyptian player of the year award and the.

Another noteworthy player to appear for Rovers in this decade was Ronnie Dix (born 5 September 1912). He made his debut on 25 February 1928 against Charlton Athletic at an age of 15 years, 173 days, making him the youngest player to represent Bristol Rovers in a competitive first-team match. One week later, in a game against Norwich City on 3 March 1928 he scored his first goal at an age of 15 years, 180 days, making him the youngest goalscorer in Football League history, a record that still stands today. He remained the only 15-year-old to play for Rovers for almost 77 years, when Scott Sinclair made his debut aged 15 years, 275 days in December 2004.

Honours

- Gloucestershire Cup — 1924–25 and 1927–28

== The 1930s ==
Season	League	Position
1929–30	Football League Division 3 (South)	20th of 22
1930–31	Football League Division 3 (South)	15th of 22
1931–32	Football League Division 3 (South)	18th of 22
1932–33	Football League Division 3 (South)	9th of 22
1933–34	Football League Division 3 (South)	7th of 22
1934–35	Football League Division 3 (South)	8th of 22
1935–36	Football League Division 3 (South)	17th of 22
1936–37	Football League Division 3 (South)	15th of 22
1937–38	Football League Division 3 (South)	15th of 22
1938–39	Football League Division 3 (South)	22nd of 22

Bristol Rovers' manager David McLean resigned on 17 September 1930. His replacement, Captain Albert Prince-Cox brought many changes to the club. One of his first actions as manager was to take the club on a mid-season tour of The Netherlands, and on 16 November 1930 Rovers beat the Netherlands national team 3–2, just 24 hours after beating Coventry City 1–0 in the league.

1930–31 club colours	1931–32 club colours

One of the innovations introduced by Albert Prince-Cox was the blue and white quartered shirts, which are still worn today. These were first used during the 1931–32 season, Prince-Cox believed that they made the players look larger and more intimidating. During the 1931–32 season, the team took part in two mid-season tours of The Netherlands, and one of France. The team also returned to France at the end of the season where they played A.C. Milan and a French XI, losing both games 3–1.

The sequence of events that eventually resulted in Bristol Rovers leaving the city and playing their home games in Bath during the 1980s began in 1932, when Rovers agreed a lease of Eastville Stadium to the Bristol Greyhound Racing Association that included a clause stating that if Rovers were to sell the stadium then the greyhound association would have first refusal, and that the price would not exceed £13,000. In 1934 the lease was amended to allow the Bristol Greyhound Racing Association to buy the stadium whenever they wished to purchase it, providing that they gave two months notice in writing to the football club. The purchase price was guaranteed to be not less than £8,000 and not more than £13,000. In 1939, Rovers wrote to the greyhound company informing them that they were prepared to sell the stadium, the greyhound company replying with an offer of £20,000 for the freehold.

On 13 April 1935, Rovers played Watford in the final of the Division 3 (South) Cup at The Old Den. The match was played at a neutral venue because both clubs had refused to take part in a coin toss to decide home advantage. Rovers won the match 3–2, winning their only national trophy in the period between World War I and World War II.

During a match with Luton Town on 13 April 1936, Rovers suffered the biggest defeat in their history, losing 12–0. 10 of the goals were scored by Joe Payne, which is still the league record for the most goals scored by a single player in a match. Rovers finished bottom of the league in the 1938–39 season, and were forced to apply for re-election to the league when competitive football resumed after the war.

Honours

- Division 3 (South) Cup — 1934–35
- Gloucestershire Cup — 1934–35, 1935–36 and 1937–38

== The 1940s ==
Season	League	Position
1946–47	Football League Division 3 (South)	14th of 22
1947–48	Football League Division 3 (South)	20th of 22
1948–49	Football League Division 3 (South)	5th of 22

Official league football resumed after World War II for the 1946–47 season. During the war Rovers had played mainly friendly games, and also took part in the unofficial Division 3 South (South) competition in 1945–46.

The Bristol Rovers Supporters Club was set up in 1947 to provide financial support to the football club. The first chairman was former Gloucestershire cricketer Hampden Alpass.

Honours

- Gloucestershire Cup — 1947–48 and 1948–49

== The 1950s ==
Season	League	Position
1949–50	Football League Division 3 (South)	9th of 22
1950–51	Football League Division 3 (South)	6th of 24
1951–52	Football League Division 3 (South)	7th of 24
1952–53	Football League Division 3 (South)	1st of 24
1953–54	Football League Division 2	9th of 22
1954–55	Football League Division 2	9th of 22
1955–56	Football League Division 2	6th of 22
1956–57	Football League Division 2	9th of 22
1957–58	Football League Division 2	10th of 22
1958–59	Football League Division 2	6th of 22

The 1950s was the most successful decade in the history of Bristol Rovers. The club reached the quarter-finals of the FA Cup twice, achieved their highest ever placing in the football pyramid, won a divisional title and had a player called up to the England squad. Geoff Bradford won his first and only international cap for England in 1955, when he played, and scored, in a 5–1 win over Denmark. This was the only time a Bristol Rovers player has ever played for England.

During the second world war, the Bristol Greyhound Racing Association had invested money into Bristol Rovers, and as a result the Greyhound Association had taken control of the football club's accounts and board of directors. In 1950, an FA commission, after examining the club's books, fined Bristol Rovers £250 and ordered the greyhound company to relinquish its controlling interest in the football club and banned club secretary Charles Ferrari from football club management.

In the 1950–51 season Bristol Rovers reached the quarter-finals of the FA Cup for the first time. The quarter-final was against Newcastle United at St James' Park and was a 0–0 draw. The attendance at this game was 62,787, and it remains the largest ever crowd to watch a match involving Bristol Rovers. The replay at Eastville attracted an attendance of 30,074 to see Newcastle win 3–1. This season also saw the adoption of Goodnight Irene as a favorite song of Bristol Rovers fans. The song was sung at the Rovers fans by supporters of Plymouth Argyle before a match at Eastville, because a version of it was in the charts at the time, and again to taunt the Rovers fans after Argyle had taken the lead. Rovers went on to win the game 3–1 and replied to the Plymouth taunts by singing Goodnight Argyle. The song remained popular with the Rovers fans, and over the years became the anthem of the supporters.

The first league title to be won by Bristol Rovers since the 1904–05 Southern League championship was the 1952–53 Division 3 (South) title. This was the first time Rovers had won promotion since joining the Football League in 1920.

The highest ever league placing by Rovers was achieved in both the 1955–56 and 1958–59 seasons, when the team finished in sixth place in the second tier of league football. In 1955–56, Rovers only missed out on promotion to the top flight by four points.

Perhaps the most impressive win in the history of Bristol Rovers was the 4–0 FA Cup victory over Manchester United, managed by Matt Busby, on 7 January 1956. Five of the United players on that day were later to die in the Munich air disaster. In the same competition during the 1957–58 season Rovers reached the quarter-final for the second time, where they lost 3–1 to Fulham at Craven Cottage.

Honours

- Football League Division 3 (South) — 1952–53
- Gloucestershire Cup
  - Won — 1954–55 and 1955–56
  - Shared — 1950–51, 1953–54 and 1958–59

== The 1960s ==
Season	League	Position
1959–60	Football League Division 2	9th of 22
1960–61	Football League Division 2	17th of 22
1961–62	Football League Division 2	21st of 22
1962–63	Football League Division 3	19th of 24
1963–64	Football League Division 3	12th of 24
1964–65	Football League Division 3	6th of 24
1965–66	Football League Division 3	16th of 24
1966–67	Football League Division 3	5th of 24
1967–68	Football League Division 3	15th of 24
1968–69	Football League Division 3	16th of 24

The biggest comeback in the history of Bristol Rovers came on 29 August 1960, when Rovers trailed Leeds United 4–0 at half time at Eastville. Rovers then scored four goals in the second half, resulting in a 4–4 draw.

The 1960–61 season was the debut of the Football League Cup, and Rovers are credited with being the first winners of a game in this competition. On 26 September 1960, Rovers beat Fulham 2–1 at Eastville in front of a crowd of 20,022. Although other first-round games were played on the same evening, the Rovers v Fulham game kicked off early at 7:15 pm, meaning that this was the first result in the competition. The 1961–62 season saw Bristol Rovers get relegated to Division 3, having finished in 21st place with 33 points.

1962–63 home kit	1963–64 home kit	1966–67 home kit

For the 1962–63 season, Rovers abandoned their now familiar blue and white quarters in favour of blue pinstripes. Also in this season, the club signed goalkeeper Esmond Million from Middlesbrough for £5,000. In April 1963, The People newspaper ran a story alleging that Million had accepted a bribe to lose the match against Bradford (Park Avenue) on 20 April. During the game he had allowed a backpass to slip past him and allowed a cross to go, enabling Bradford to score twice. Unfortunately for Million, Rovers also scored twice so the game ended 2–2 and Million did not receive the money he had been offered to lose the game. Million and his accomplice, Keith Williams, were fined £50 each by Doncaster Magistrates' Court, and banned from football for life by The FA.

On 14 December 1963, during a 4–0 victory over Bristol City, Geoff Bradford scored his final goal for Bristol Rovers. This was his 242nd league goal for the club, which still stands as a club record, and he scored a total of 355 goals for the club in all competitions and reserve team games.

Honours

- Gloucestershire Cup
  - Won — 1962–63, 1964–65 and 1965–66
  - Shared — 1963–64 and 1967–68

== The 1970s ==
Season	League	Position
1969–70	Football League Division 3	3rd of 24
1970–71	Football League Division 3	6th of 24
1971–72	Football League Division 3	6th of 24
1972–73	Football League Division 3	5th of 24
1973–74	Football League Division 3	2nd of 24
1974–75	Football League Division 2	19th of 22
1975–76	Football League Division 2	18th of 22
1976–77	Football League Division 2	15th of 22
1977–78	Football League Division 2	18th of 22
1978–79	Football League Division 2	16th of 22

1969–70 home kit	1973–74 home kit

The furthest Bristol Rovers have ever progressed in the league cup is the quarter-finals. This was achieved twice in consecutive seasons – 1970–71 and 1971–72. On the first occasion, Rovers lost their quarter-final match against Aston Villa 1–0 in a replay at Villa Park, having drawn 1–1 at Eastville. The following season they lost 4–2 at home to Stoke City, in front of a crowd of 33,624 at the same stage of the competition.

In July 1972, Rovers appointed Don Megson as their new manager. His first task as manager was to guide the team through the Watney Cup, where the team beat Wolves and Burnley to reach the final of the competition at Eastville. On 5 August 1972, Rovers faced Sheffield United in the final in a match that was drawn 0–0 at full time. A penalty shoot-out was held to decide the winners, and Rovers won 7–6, meaning that Megson had won a trophy after only three matches as manager. Also that season, Rovers made good progress in the League Cup. In the third round they played a Manchester United side that included Bobby Charlton and George Best and drew 1–1 at Eastville, earning a replay at Old Trafford. Rovers won the replay 2–1 and progressed to play Wolves in the fourth round, but failed to make it to a third consecutive quarter-final after losing 4–0.

For the 1973–74 season, Rovers had switched back to their blue and white quartered shirts, which they have worn ever since. This coincided with a promotion-winning season, with second place in division 3 earning them a second spell in the second division. On their way to promotion, the team won 8–2 away to Brighton & Hove Albion, managed by Brian Clough, the only 8–2 away win ever recorded in the third division. This was also the only league game where two Bristol Rovers players scored hat-tricks in the same match, with Alan Warboys scoring 4 and Bruce Bannister 3.

Although the revered Warboys and Bannister strikeforce would be broken up, Rovers remained in the Second Division for the remainder of the decade.

Rovers' heaviest post-war league defeat came during the 1977–78 season, when they lost 9–0 to Tottenham Hotspur at White Hart Lane. Shortly after this result, manager Don Megson left the club to join the Portland Timbers in the NASL.

On 24 October 1978, Rovers played a friendly against the Zambia national team at Eastville, where the touring side were beaten 4–1.

Honours

- Watney Cup — 1972–73
- Gloucestershire Cup — 1973–74 and 1974–75

== The 1980s ==
Season	League	Position
1979–80	Football League Division 2	19th of 22
1980–81	Football League Division 2	22nd of 22
1981–82	Football League Division 3	15th of 24
1982–83	Football League Division 3	7th of 24
1983–84	Football League Division 3	5th of 24
1984–85	Football League Division 3	6th of 24
1985–86	Football League Division 3	16th of 24
1986–87	Football League Division 3	19th of 24
1987–88	Football League Division 3	8th of 24
1988–89	Football League Division 3	5th of 24

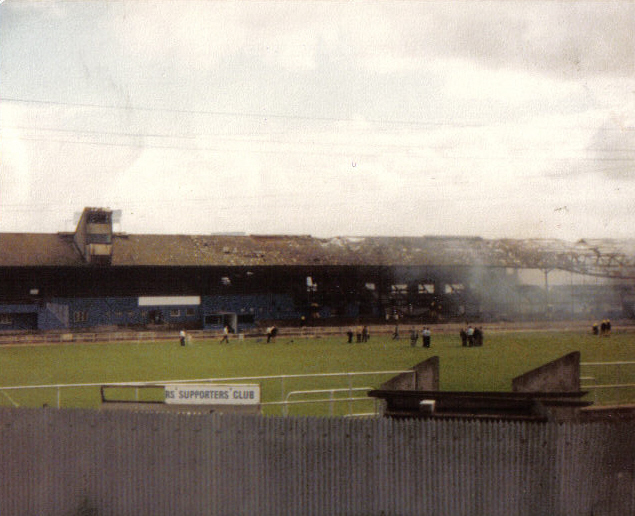
Aftermath of the South Stand fire at Eastville, August 1980

The 1980–81 season was one of the worst in the club's history. Rovers won just five league games during the season, and only four home wins in all competitions. The team was relegated at the end of the season, finishing in last place, seven points below the next worst team, Bristol City. The club had also failed to agree an extension to the lease on their stadium, which had had its capacity reduced from 30,000 to 12,500 due to new safety laws, causing fears that they would have to find a new home. On 17 August 1980, a fire started in the South Grandstand in Eastville Stadium, destroying the administrative offices and changing rooms. As a result, Rovers were forced to play five games at Ashton Gate, three in the league and two in the League Cup. This location was not popular with the fans however, who considered this to be enemy territory, and all five games were poorly attended.

During the 1981–82 season, with the lease on Eastville coming to an end, Rovers were offered deals to groundshare by both Bristol City and Bath City, however a five-year extension to their existing lease was agreed and Rovers would remain at Eastville until 1986. Before the lease was agreed, the Rovers chairman, Martin Flook, had made an offer of £450,000 to buy Ashton Gate Stadium from Bristol City, who were on the verge of bankruptcy at the time. However, when City reformed as Bristol City (1982) plc, this bid was rejected.

Unlike Bristol City, who had suffered three consecutive relegations in the early 80s, Rovers stabilised in the Third Division. The goals of Paul Randall and playmaking skills of David Williams were able to keep Rovers in promotion contention in the first half of the decade but following Williams' departure to Norwich City, two poorer seasons followed before the appointment of Gerry Francis as manager in 1987.

The only World Cup winner to play for Bristol Rovers was Alan Ball, who won the tournament with England in 1966. He signed for the club in January 1983 and made 17 league appearances, scoring two goals, in what would be his final season before retiring as a player.

The last game to be played at Eastville was on 26 April 1986, when Rovers drew 1–1 with Chesterfield in front of just 3,576 spectators. The following season Rovers moved to Bath City's Twerton Park ground, where they would remain for ten years. One home game during the first season in Bath was played at Ashton Gate however, the match against Swindon Town was played in front of 8,196 spectators in an effort to raise money to help with Rovers' financial problems.

At the start of the 1987–88 season, former Rovers player Gerry Francis was appointed as manager. He immediately went about building the team that would go on to win the Third Division title within three seasons, signing Nigel Martyn, Ian Holloway and Devon White before the start of his first season in charge. The following season, 1988–89, Rovers reached the third division play-off final for the first time, but they failed to win promotion, losing by a single goal to Port Vale.

Honours

- Gloucestershire Cup — 1981–82, 1982–83, 1983–84, 1984–85 and 1988–89

== The 1990s ==
Season	League	Position
1989–90	Football League Division 3	1st of 24
1990–91	Football League Division 2	13th of 24
1991–92	Football League Division 2	13th of 24
1992–93	Football League Division 2	24th of 24
1993–94	Football League Division 2	8th of 24
1994–95	Football League Division 2	4th of 24
1995–96	Football League Division 2	10th of 24
1996–97	Football League Division 2	17th of 24
1997–98	Football League Division 2	5th of 24
1998–99	Football League Division 2	13th of 24

Success in the league was achieved by Gerry Francis in his third season as Bristol Rovers manager. The team won the 1989–90 Third Division, clinching promotion on 2 May 1990 with a 3–0 victory over local rivals Bristol City, who finished second and were also promoted. This match inspired the title of a former Bristol Rovers fanzine, The Second of May. The championship winning season was rounded off by the club's first ever appearance at Wembley Stadium, where they lost 2–1 to Tranmere Rovers in the final of the Leyland DAF Cup. 32,000 Rovers fans travelled to Wembley for the match, which was also attended by cult band (and Tranmere fans) Half Man Half Biscuit, who later performed Goodnight Irene on John Peel's radio show as a tribute to the Bristol Rovers fans on that day.

The following season Rovers suffered a second fire at their ground. Ten years after the fire at Eastville, the main stand at Twerton Park was damaged on 16 September 1990 in what was later found to be an arson attack. Seven Bristol City fans were later tried and convicted of the crime.

The first two seasons back in the Second Division saw Rovers finish a credible 13th place, their highest in the league since the 1950s. In the 1990–91 season the side were outsiders for play-off place before petering out in mid-table. Gerry Francis left for QPR and was succeeded by Martin Dobson, who left following a dismal start to 1991–92. Dennis Rofe brought a turnaround in form to finish mid-table.

Rovers' third season in the second tier of the league resulted in relegation. Dennis Rofe was sacked following another awful start, and veteran manager Malcolm Allison was appointed in an effort to turn things round, without much success. John Ward in turn replaced Allison near the end of the season, but little improvement followed. At the end of the 1992–93 season, Rovers were bottom of the division, now known as Division One due to the creation of the FA Premier League. The club made their most expensive signing ever during this season, buying Andy Tillson from QPR for £370,000.

A second appearance at Wembley was earned at the end of the 1994–95 season, in the Second Division play-off final. Rovers lost by the same scoreline as their only other game to be played there – 2–1. This time the opponents were Huddersfield Town, and the attendance of 59,175 is the second highest ever at a Bristol Rovers game. Also during this season, Rovers faced their landlords, Bath City, in the first round of the FA Cup. Rovers won the game 5–0, and unusually for a game involving a league team, there was no fan segregation. The following season Rovers failed to make a serious challenge for the play-offs, resulting in the sacking of John Ward and his replacement by former player Ian Holloway.

1996–97 home kit	1997–98 home kit

Rovers' return to Bristol was at the beginning of the 1996–97 season. Bristol Rugby Club were experiencing financial difficulties, and offered Rovers the opportunity to buy half of the Memorial Ground (now called The Memorial Stadium) for £2.3 million. The stadium was not ready for league football however, and the first game of the season was played at Twerton Park. The return to Bristol was finally achieved for the second home game of the season against Stockport County, a game that was drawn 1–1. The Bristol Rovers home kit for this season featured an unusual striped quartered design, known to the club's fans as the Tesco bag shirts in reference to the company's blue and white striped carrier bags. This design was not universally popular, and prompted the Trumpton Times fanzine to change its name to Wot, No Quarters?.

On 17 April 1998, Bristol Rugby Club were placed in receivership, invoking a clause in the tenancy agreement allowing Rovers to buy the other half of the Memorial Ground for £100,000. Rovers now owned their own stadium for the first time since 1939.

Honours

- Football League Division 3 — 1989–90
- Gloucestershire Cup — 1989–90, 1992–93, 1993–94 and 1994–95

== The 2000s ==
Season	League	Position
1999–2000	Football League Division 2	7th of 24
2000–01	Football League Division 2	21st of 24
2001–02	Football League Division 3	23rd of 24
2002–03	Football League Division 3	20th of 24
2003–04	Football League Division 3	15th of 24
2004–05	Football League 2	12th of 24
2005–06	Football League 2	12th of 24
2006–07	Football League 2	6th of 24
2007–08	Football League 1	16th of 24
2008–09	Football League 1	11th of 24

Until the end of the 2000–01 season, Bristol Rovers had been the only team in the Football League never to have played in the first or the fourth levels of the league. This record ended when the team were relegated to Division 3 for the 2001–02 season. Holloway resigned at the halfway point of the season, and Garry Thompson took over for the rest of the campaign, but was unable to prevent relegation. Gerry Francis returned to the club and oversaw a good start that saw them top the division at the end of August; results soon faded however, and it became clear that Rovers were not going to get out of the division at the first attempt. Francis resigned due to personal issues in December with the side in 20th place, leading to Garry Thompson being reinstated as manager. Despite masterminding a cup upset against Premier League opponents Derby County, Rovers' League form remained poor, and the club hit its lowest ebb, finishing second bottom of the whole League and only surviving due to a truly awful season by bottom-placed Halifax Town.

With the League introducing two relegation places from Division Three the next season it was obvious that Rovers would have to improve quickly, and Thompson was duly sacked and replaced by former player Ray Graydon. While Graydon had experienced promotion success twice with Walsall, he failed to significantly improve Rovers' form, and the next two seasons were also spent fighting relegation to the Conference. Soon, Graydon was gone, and Ian Atkins took the hotseat. A slight improvement occurred, resulting in Rovers hovering in mid-table; this was far from what the board and fans wanted however, and after just over a season in charge, Atkins was dismissed. in his place the club appointed Paul Trollope as player-manager, aided by director of football Lennie Lawrence. Trollope's first season in full charge (2005–06) saw the club briefly contend for the play-offs, but eventually resulted in another mid-table (12th place) finish.

2003–04 home kit	2006–07 home kit

Improvements were needed and they came during the 2006–07 season, when Rovers reached the final of the Football League Trophy for the second time in the club's history. The team were beaten 3–2 by Doncaster Rovers after extra time, having drawn 2–2 after 90 minutes at the Millennium Stadium in Cardiff, Richard Walker and Sammy Igoe putting Rovers back on level terms, after Jonathan Forte and Paul Heffernan scored early goals for Donny. Graeme Lee's header after 110 minutes settled the game in the opponents favour.

The team also managed to qualify for the playoffs, finishing 6th in the final table (the last play-off spot awarded to a team) where they played 3rd placed and tie favourites Lincoln City. Rovers qualified for the final at the new Wembley Stadium after a 7–4 aggregate win over Lincoln. In the final at Wembley Stadium they faced Shrewsbury Town. In front of 40,000 "Gasheads" and 20,000 "Shrews", Bristol Rovers won by three goals to one in what was a thrilling match. Richard Walker and Sammy Igoe were the Wembley heroes once again, despite Stewart Drummonds goal inside the first three minutes. The game was marked though, by the home match atmosphere created by the huge Rovers' support and their almost endless singing of their signature song "Goodnight Irene". Rovers also became only the second team, behind Chelsea to have played at both Millennium Stadium and Wembley Stadium in the same season. It turned out to be a great season for the city, as Rover's archrivals Bristol City were celebrating their own success, finishing second to Scunthorpe United in their own league, securing promotion to The Championship for the 2007–08 season.

Honours

- League Two Play-Off winners — 2006–07

2007–08 saw Rovers survive in League One as they finished 16th, with the prospect of relegation never really finding its way around the club, however, top 6 was always a bit ambitious and it proved to be a transitional season for the club, just to find their feet amongst the division. A run in the League Cup was halted by premier league West Ham United in just the second round, Craig Bellamy scoring two first-half goals for the East-Londerners. Rovers had got through to this game as a result of an un-fancied win against Crystal Palace at the Memorial Stadium, thanks to Craig Disley sending the tie into extra time with a 63rd-minute equaliser, setting the impetus for Rovers to go on and win 4–1 on penalties. However the big news of the season was a brilliant run to the quarter-finals of the FA Cup, where they were finally eliminated 5–1 at the expense of high-flying Championship side West Bromwich Albion.

Throughout this run, Rovers had seen off the challenge of League-one rivals Leyton Orient, where after two draws Rovers won the tie 6–5 on penalties, Non-League Rushden and Diamonds, Premier League side Fulham (5–3 on penalties), League two strugglers Barnet (a comfortable 2–0 success) and Coca-Cola Championship outfit Southampton, where an 85th minute free-kick from Rickie Lambert (on his 26th birthday) saw Rovers into the last eight. There was to be no repeat however, the following season, a season that saw Rovers knocked out by League Two side AFC Bournemouth in the very first round of the competition's proper. Rovers were also knocked out in the first round of the other two competitions. Despite this setback Trollope's men went on to finish a comfortable 11th in the table as 29-goal hero Rickie Lambert played what was to be his last season in the blue and white shirt.

These 29 goals all came in the domestic league and Lambert shared this tally with Swindon Town's Simon Cox, who just like Lambert was playing in his last season for his club, moving to West Bromwich Albion of the Coca-Cola Championship. Despite the loss of striker Lambert, a fine start to the 2009–10 season pushed Rovers into 3rd place in the table at the start of October, which included a thrilling 3–2 victory away to Southampton on 29 September in which a last minute (96th to be precise) goal by Andy Williams saw Rovers clinch victory and go four points clear of 4th placed Colchester United. A run of five successive defeats, however, including 5–1 and 4–0 defeats to Norwich City and Leeds United respectively, saw Rovers drop out of the play-off places. Rovers maintained a very consistent level of performance throughout the remainder of the season, never falling out of the top 10 positions in the league table. Eventually, on 10 April 2010, Rovers' play-off hopes were put to an end for another season after losing 2–1 away to Oldham Athletic. The side finished the season in 11th place after gaining only one point from their last six games.

== The 2010s ==
Season	League	Position
2009–10	Football League 1	11th of 24
2010–11	Football League 1	22nd of 24
2011–12	Football League 2	13th of 24
2012–13	Football League 2	14th of 24
2013–14	Football League 2	23rd of 24
2014–15	Conference Premier	2nd of 24
2015–16	Football League 2	3rd of 24
2016–17	EFL League 1	10th of 24
2017–18	EFL League 1	13th of 24
2018–19	EFL League 1	15th of 24

Rovers' poor form continued into the 2010–11 season, and they were in the relegation zone from the first weeks of the campaign. On 15 December 2010, Paul Trollope was sacked, following a poor run of form. On 10 January 2011, Dave Penney was appointed as his replacement. Under the new manager Rovers proceeded to lose 9 of the next 13 games, and Penney's tenure as manager was brought to an end after barely two months, with the club bottom of the table. Stuart Campbell took over as caretaker manager for the rest of the season, and despite steering the side to a creditable 16 points from 12 games, Campbell was unable to prevent relegation, the club's horrid mid-season run ultimately proving too much to recover from.

While Campbell was favourite to be installed as full-time manager, the board instead chose to appoint Paul Buckle, manager of that season's losing League Two play-off finalists, Torquay United. Buckle failed to repeat the success he had brought to Torquay, and only exacerbated the situation when he fell out with fan favourite Campbell, leading to his dismissal in January 2012 with the club in the lower reaches of League Two. He was replaced by Mark McGhee, who improved the club's fortunes and steered them to safety and a 13th-place finish.

McGhee heavily invested in the squad in the post-season, and Rovers were considered among the favourites for promotion to League One. However, the club made a dire start, and were near the bottom of the table from the earliest weeks of the season. By December 2012 it was clear that Rovers were in perhaps the biggest danger of dropping out of the Football League they had ever been, which resulted in McGhee being sacked and former manager John Ward returning to the club. The club's form greatly improved in the weeks that followed, and another safe finish was achieved, this time 14th.

2013–14 looked to be repeating the pattern of the previous two seasons, with mediocre initial form followed by a climb into mid-table by early spring. However, a terrible run of form then set in, resulting in Ward being "moved upstairs" to the role director of football (a role he was ultimately sacked from days after the season ended) and replaced by his assistant Darrell Clarke. A win in a vital six-pointer against Wycombe Wanderers in the penultimate match appeared to have secured Rovers's League status and condemned Wycombe to relegation. Rovers only required a draw in their final league match, at home to Mansfield, but were defeated 1–0 while both Wycombe and Northampton Town won their own final matches. It meant that Rovers' 94-year consecutive stay in the Football League was over, finishing behind Wycombe only on goal difference.

Despite overseeing the club's relegation into the Conference Premier, Clarke remained in charge. An indifferent start to the season, with Rovers picking up just one point from their first three games and third defeat in seven in their away fixture with part-timers Braintree Town, saw calls for the manager to be sacked. What followed was an incredible run of just two defeats in 39 league games as Rovers came agonisingly close to making an immediate return to the Football League, finishing as runners-up to Barnet. They were promoted back to League Two after winning the Play-off final against Grimsby Town on Penalties.

Even after another indifferent start the season, winning only 10 points from their first nine games, Rovers went on to complete a second successive promotion in 2015–16. Rovers were amongst the play-off chasers from around the midway point in the season but form that saw the team pick up 35 points from the final 42 available was enough to see them finish in 3rd place and automatic promotion at the expense of Accrington Stanley on goal difference. Promotion was only secured with an injury time winner from defender Lee Brown in a 2–1 victory over already relegated Dagenham & Redbridge, a goal that has gone down in Rovers folklore.

2016–17 was Rovers' first season back in the third tier in six seasons and saw the club flirt with a third successive promotion. While their home form was good, their away form was poor. A 10th place finish, just six points off the play-offs was respectable though and represented their highest finishing position in the English football pyramid in 17 years.

The following season was another where Rovers' reasonable home form was let down by dreadful away results. At the half-way point, Rovers were just four points above the relegation zone. More consistent results in the second half saw the club again finish in a respectable mid-table spot, this time 13th never really threatening to make headlines at either end of the table.

Darrell Clarke's reign as manager was to come to an end during the 2018–19 season with the club staring down the barrel of a return to League Two. Clarke's finish game as manager was a 4–0 drubbing at home to Doncaster Rovers in December 2018. Graham Coughlan was appointed in Clarke's place, initially on a caretaker basis before being handed the role permanently in January 2019. Coughlan's appointment saw a much needed improvement in results although it was the penultimate match of the season before Rovers confirmed their survival. 15th place represented a reasonable finish after a difficult season.

During the 2019–20 season, Rovers initially mounted a promotion push and were as high as fourth following an impressive 2–1 win away at Ipswich Town. The Ipswich game would prove to be Coughlan's final game in charge with the Irishman hinting in his post-match interview that he could take the club no further and of his desire to work closer to his Sheffield home. Three days later, Coughlan was appointed manager of League Two side Mansfield Town. Rovers handed Ben Garner his first managerial role on 23 December 2019.

Honours

- Conference Premier play-off winners — 2014–15

== 2020-present ==
Season	League	Position
2019–20	EFL League 1	14th of 24
2020–21	EFL League 1	24th of 24
2021–22	EFL League 2	3rd of 24
2022–23	EFL League 1	17th of 24
2023–24	EFL League 1	15th of 24
2024–25	EFL League 1	22nd of 24

Rovers' form following Coughlan's departure nosedived and a season of promise could easily have turned into a relegation battle were it not for the expulsion of Bury and a 12 points deduction for Bolton Wanderers. Following Garner's appointment, Rovers recorded just two wins, four draws and nine defeats in the league, though Garner was absent for part of January due to a family illness. On 13 March 2020, all football in the UK was suspended due to the worsening COVID-19 pandemic, initially until 3 April then until 30 April at the earliest. On 9 June and with no end to the crisis in sight, League One club's voted to end the season early with the league table decided based on points per game. Rovers therefore finished the season 14th with 1.29ppg. Their final game before the suspension was arguably their best performance of the season, a 2–0 home win over Sunderland.

The 2020–21 season began with lots of optimism for Rovers following several promising high-profile signings, but Ben Garner failed to turn around the form that he had overseen in the second-half of the previous season and was sacked in November 2020 following a 4–1 home defeat to Fleetwood Town with Rovers having only won 12 points from 11 matches. On 19 November, Paul Tisdale was brought in as new manager. Tisdale failed to reverse the side's poor form, picking up just 12 points in their next 15 matches, including a 6–1 defeat at Accrington Stanley, also failing to bring in a striker during the January transfer window. On account of these failures, Tisdale was sacked on 10 February 2021, after just less than three months in charge, with Rovers only outside of the relegation side on goal difference. Again a change in manager failed to bring about a change in luck and on 24 April 2021, a 1–0 defeat to Portsmouth saw Rovers nine points off of safety with two games remaining, subsequently confirming their relegation back to League Two. A 1–0 defeat at Blackpool on the final day saw Rovers finish 5 points adrift at the bottom of the table and ten points off safety.

Following relegation to League Two, there was a large squad overhaul ahead of the new season with manager Joey Barton bringing in fourteen players in the summer window and seeing twenty-one players leave the club. The club had a poor start to the season, the lowest point being a 4–1 thrashing by Exeter City in the fourth match of the season in which the hosts scored all four of their goals in the first 24 minutes. On 25 September, the club secured a first away win since December 2020 with a last-minute win over Walsall, this win seemingly saving manager Barton from the sack. Rovers' form did start to slowly improve toward the end of 2021 and they finished the year in fifteenth position after a 4–2 victory over Rochdale on 11 December, a COVID-19 outbreak in the squad meaning they did not play another league match until 15 January. This break seemed to reignite Rovers' season with the club going on a remarkable run of form in the new year with manager Barton being nominated for the Manager of the Month award for January before winning the award for March. Inspired by new loan signing Elliot Anderson with fellow January loan signing James Connolly adding what appeared to be the final piece of the puzzle to a solid defensive unit, Rovers continued to climb the table and on 15 March, following a 1–0 win over Colchester United, Rovers found themselves in the play-off positions for the first time in the season. Their season culminated in a 7-0 home victory against Scunthorpe to achieve automatic promotion in a dramatic fashion - Northampton's 3-1 victory meant The Gas would need to score all 7 without conceding in order to be promoted by goals scored, with the two sides both being level on points. This victory marked the first time Rovers had been in an automatic spot for the entire duration of the season, and ensured that they would play in the EFL League 1 in 2022-23.

Ahead of the 2023–24 season, a majority share in the club's holding company was purchased by Kuwaiti businessman Hussain AlSaeed. In October 2023, the club announced the sacking of Joey Barton, appointing Matt Taylor two months later. Following a strong start to his time in charge, seeing him nominated for League One Manager of the Month for December, the season faded away into a fifteenth placed finish.

In October 2024, the club announced that Hussain AlSaeed had reached an agreement to purchase the remaining 45% of shares owned by Wael and Samer Al Qadi. On the pitch, the poor end to the previous season continued into the 2024–25 season, culminating in Matt Taylor being sacked in December 2024. On 26 December 2024, the club appointed Iñigo Calderón for his first managerial role. Although he oversaw a small upturn in form during the early months of 2025, a dreadful run of form saw the side pick up just one point from their last ten matches, the club being relegated on 29 April. Following a 4–1 defeat to Blackpool on the final day of the season, Calderón departed the club.

On 6 May 2025, the club re-appointed Darrell Clarke as head coach, returning to the club six-and-a-half years after his departure. In December 2025, Clarke was sacked from his role as manager following a club-record ten consecutive league defeats that left the club in 23rd position, being replaced by Steve Evans on a short-term deal until the end of the season. Having guided the club away from the relegation zone to a mid-table finish, Evans signed a new two-year deal as manager in April 2026. A 2–1 victory over Tranmere Rovers on 18 April secured Rovers' seventh consecutive victory, the first time the club had achieved this since 1953.

== Bibliography ==
- Byrne, Stephen (2009). Bristol Rovers: On This Day. Durrington, West Sussex: Pitch. ISBN 978-1-9054114-9-8.
- Byrne, Stephen; Jay, Mike (2003). Bristol Rovers Football Club: The Definitive History 1883–2003. Stroud: Tempus. ISBN 0-7524-2717-2.
- Byrne, Stephen; Jay, Mike (2014). Bristol Rovers: The Official Definitive History. Stroud: Amberley. ISBN 978-1-4456-3619-1.
- Jay, Mike (1987). Bristol Rovers F.C.: A Complete Record 1883–1987. Derby: Breedon Books. ISBN 0-907969-26-7.
- Rollin, Glenda & Rollin, Jack (2006): Sky Sports Football Yearbook 2006–2007. ISBN 0-7553-1526-X
- The early days to the present day from bristolrovers.co.uk. Retrieved 25 October 2006.
- Dates and honours from bristolrovers.co.uk. Retrieved 25 October 2006.
- Geoff Bradford from bristolrovers.co.uk. Retrieved 5 November 2006.
- Bristol Rovers from Soccerbase. Retrieved 28 October 2006.
- Denmark 1–5 England, 2 October 1955 from thefa.com. Retrieved 4 November 2006.
- Goodnight Irene, by Half Man Half Biscuit from hmhb.co.uk. Retrieved 7 November 2006.
