= Forwards Festival =

Music festival in Bristol, England

Forwards
- Dates: Late August / early September
- Locations: Clifton Down, Bristol, England
- Years active: 2022–present
- Founders: Team Love, AEG Presents
- Attendance: 60,000 (over two days)
- Website: www.forwardsbristol.co.uk

Forwards (stylised FORWARDS) is an annual two-day music festival held on Clifton Down in Bristol, England. It was launched in 2022 as the first collaboration between the Bristol promoter Team Love and AEG Presents. The festival is non-camping and takes place in late August or early September, with a capacity of 60,000 people across the weekend.

In addition to its music stages, the festival provides a space for talks and debate on political and cultural topics, known as The Information.

== History ==
The inaugural edition was held on 3–4 September 2022, headlined by Jamie xx and The Chemical Brothers. The second edition, in September 2023, was headlined by Erykah Badu and Aphex Twin. The 2024 festival, held on 31 August and 1 September, was headlined by LCD Soundsystem and Four Tet. The 2025 festival, on 23–24 August 2025, featured Barry Can't Swim, Ezra Collective, Doechii, Jorja Smith and The Last Dinner Party as headliners. The 2026 festival took place on 29–30 August and featured Little Simz, Wet Leg, Tems and Goldie. It was preceded on 28 August by a separately billed concert on the same site, Forwards Presents, headlined by Lorde.

== Sustainability ==
The 2026 edition was powered almost entirely by renewable energy, with the main stage supplied by a hydrogen power plant and other areas by batteries charged from renewable suppliers. The arrangement formed part of a Clean Power Pilot funded by the West of England Combined Authority, which grew out of Massive Attack's 2024 Act 1.5 concert on the same site.
