= 1885–86 Eastville Rovers F.C. season =

Eastville Rovers
1885–86 season
- Captain: Bill Somerton

The 1885–86 season was the third to be played by the team that are now known as Bristol Rovers, and their second playing under the name Eastville Rovers.

== Season review ==
As with their first two seasons, Eastville Rovers continued to play only friendly matches during the 1885–86 season. A new blue-and-white hooped shirt with white shorts was adopted this year, replacing the original black and gold kit, and it was first worn during a truncated match against Bristol side Right Against Might on 17 October 1885. Only 40 minutes of play was possible in this game due to poor light – Right Against Might had failed to arrive at the ground until 5:10 p.m., not long before sunset.

The Boxing Day fixture away to St George was also a shortened affair, with the game being abandoned after just 20 minutes due to one of the home team's players suffering a broken leg. With the score standing at 1–0 to St George, Mr E. Fleming attempted to kick the ball, but missed and instead his shin hit a Rovers player's knee. The sound of Fleming's leg breaking was reportedly heard 60 yards away. A benefit match was played for Fleming four weeks later between a combined Warmley and St George XI and a Bristol & District representative side. The game, played in difficult conditions on a partially frozen pitch, ended 2–0 to Warmley & St George.

Where results are known, Rovers ended the season with three wins, a draw and two defeats, but they played at least nine other games on top of these.

== Results ==
Date	Opponent	Venue	Result	Notes
17 October 1885	Right Against Might	The Downs, Bristol	Won 1–0	Only 40 minutes played due to late arrival of R.A.M.
21 November 1885	Warmley	Purdown, Bristol		
28 November 1885	Warmley	Purdown, Bristol		
19 December 1885	Chippenham	Chippenham, Wiltshire	won 2-0	
26 December 1885	St George	St George, Bristol	Lost 0–1	Abandoned after about 20 minutes.
2 January 1886	Gloucester	Purdown, Bristol	Won 1–0	Gloucester played the whole game with ten men.
23 January 1886	St George	Purdown, Bristol		
30 January 1886	Clifton Association	The Downs, Bristol		
13 February 1886	Warmley	Warmley, Gloucestershire	Drew 0–0	
27 February 1886	Clifton Association	The Downs, Bristol	Drew 1–1	
6 March 1886	Gloucester	Budding's Field, Gloucester	Won 3–1	
13 March 1886	Right Against Might	Durdham Down, Bristol	Drew 0–0	
10 April 1886	Warmley	Warmley, Gloucestershire	Lost 3–7	

In addition to these games there were also matches played against Bristol Wagon Works, Cardiff, Melksham and Wotton-under-Edge, the dates, venues and results of which are not known.

== Bibliography ==
- Byrne, Stephen; Jay, Mike (2003). Bristol Rovers Football Club: The Definitive History 1883–2003. Stroud: Tempus. ISBN 0-7524-2717-2.
