= Alpass =

Alpass is a surname. Notable people with the surname include:

- Fiona Alpass, New Zealand psychologist
- Hampden Alpass (1906–1999), English cricketer
- Joseph Alpass (1873–1969), British politician

== See also ==
- All-pass filter
- Eric Allpass (1889–1977), Australian politician
