= 1884–85 Eastville Rovers F.C. season =

Eastville Rovers
1884–85 season
- Captain: Bill Somerton
- Ground: Three Acres
Home colours

The 1884–85 season was the second to be played by the team that are now known as Bristol Rovers, and their first playing under the name Eastville Rovers.

== Season review ==
As well as a new name, the team moved to a new ground known as Three Acres in the Ashley Down area of Bristol, and appointed Bill Somerton as captain. As with their previous season, the club played only friendly matches. Boxing, Cricket and Rugby were the most popular sports in Bristol at the time, and only a small number of association football teams played in the city, limiting the potential opposition for Rovers.

The full details of the games played this season are not known, but they suffered a 7–1 defeat at the hands of Warmley some time before a second eleven lost 2–1 to the same opposition on 8 November 1884. Two matches were scheduled against Gloucester, in Gloucester on 27 December and in Bristol on 7 February, and there were also games played against Bristol Wagon Works, Clifton Wanderers, Melksham, Right Against Might, St George, and Wotton-under-Edge.

In addition to these games, a match was arranged against a team in Cardiff, but this had to be cancelled when the Rovers team refused to travel on the Aust Ferry.

== Known results ==
=== First team ===
Date	Opponent	Venue	Result	Notes
4 October	Right Against Might	The Downs, Bristol	Lost 1–0	
11 October	Warmley	Warmley	Lost 1–7	
13 December	Clifton Wanderers	Purdown, Bristol	Lost 0–2	
3 January	Gloucester	Budding's Field, Gloucester	Lost 0–1	
7 February	Gloucester	Purdown, Bristol	Lost 1–4	
21 February	Clifton 2nd XI	The Downs, Bristol	Drew 1–1	

=== Second team ===
Date	Opponent	Venue	Result	Notes
8 November	Warmley 2nd XI	Warmley, Gloucestershire	Lost 1–2	
29 November	Warmley 2nd XI	Purdown, Bristol	Drew 0–0	

== Bibliography ==
- Byrne, Stephen; Jay, Mike (2003). Bristol Rovers Football Club: The Definitive History 1883–2003. Stroud: Tempus. ISBN 0-7524-2717-2.
- Byrne, Stephen; Jay, Mike (2014). Bristol Rovers: The Official Definitive History. Stroud: Amberley. ISBN 978-1-4456-3619-1.
