= Bristol Downs Association Football League =

Association football league in England

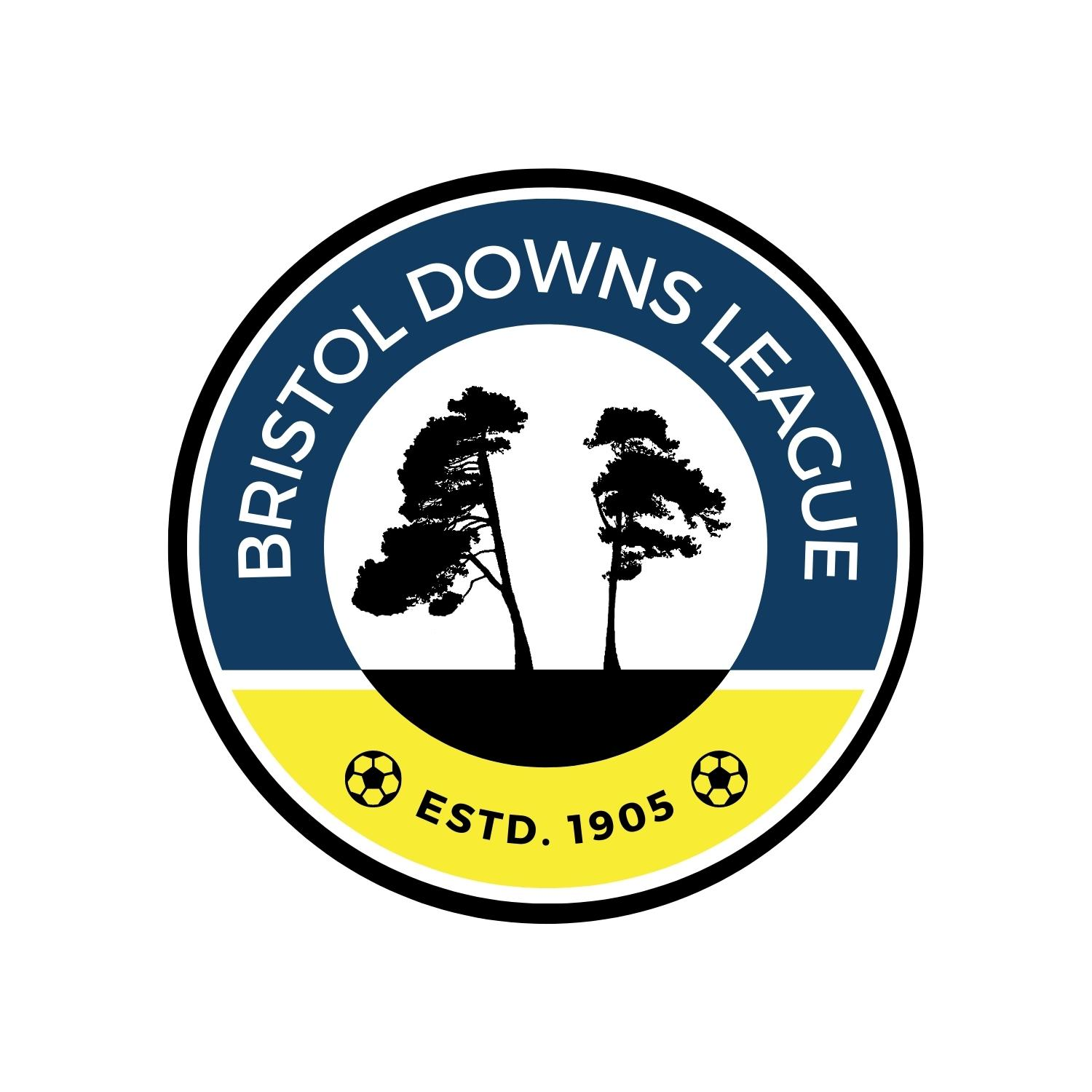
- Founded: 1905
- Country: England
- Divisions: 4
- Number of clubs: 39
- League cup(s): Norman Hardy Cup (Divisions 1 & 2); All Saints Cup (Divisions 3 & 4)
- Current champions: Jersey Rangers FC (2022-23)
- Website: bristoldownsleague.co.uk

The Bristol Downs Association Football League is an English football league based in the city of Bristol. It is a completely standalone league system which does not feed into the English football league pyramid. The Downs League is unusual in that all matches are played on one site, namely the large open space known as Bristol Downs. The league is affiliated to the Gloucestershire County FA.

== History ==
Organised football first began to be played in Bristol in the 1880s and football started on the Downs around the same time, helped by the introduction of a tram route from the city centre to the top of Blackboy Hill. The Downs League was formed in 1905 with 30 founder members, all of them teams who were already playing in the city and on the Downs' many pitches. One of the founder member clubs, Sneyd Park, remains in the league to this day, having played in the top division of the league in every season since its foundation. Clifton St Vincents joined the league in its second season and have also clocked up 100 years of membership.

In the 1920s the league's top side was Union Jack FC, who won the league nine times in ten seasons and even managed to beat the much higher-ranked Cheltenham Town 6–3 away in the FA Cup in 1925. Future Arsenal star Eddie Hapgood turned out for Union Jack before going on to Football League and international stardom. Another player with Union Jack was Wally Hammond, a future England cricket captain.

In the 1930s Dockland Settlement won six championships in seven seasons. The years after the Second World War was probably when the league was at its strongest, with many players leaving the league to turn professional.

In the 1950s Clifton St. Vincents won six league titles, but St. Gabriels equalled Union Jack's record of seven successive titles between 1969 and 1975. In recent years Clifton St. Vincents, Torpedo and Sneyd Park have been the dominant sides in the league.

Today the league boasts around 40 teams in four divisions. There are also two knockout cup competitions – the Norman Hardy Cup (for teams from Divisions One and Two) and the All Saints Cup (for teams from Divisions Three and Four). BBC Bristol maintains a keen interest in the league, with news and features.

== Past champions ==
All information from the Full Time website.

Season	Division 1	Division 2	Division 3	Division 4
2010–11	Sneyd Park	Sneyd Park Reserves	Jersey Rangers	Saints Old Boys Reserves
2011–12	Torpedo	DAC Beachcroft	Saints Old Boys Reserves	Helios
2012–13	Sneyd Park	Portland Old Boys	Old Cliftonians	Luccombe Garage
2013–14	Clifton St Vincents	Sneyd Park Reserves	Easton Cowboys Reserves	Durdham Down Adult School
2014–15	Sneyd Park	Torpedo Reserves	Old Elizabethans	Old Cliftonians Reserves
2015–16	Torpedo	Old Elizabethans	Sneyd Park A	Saints Old Boys A
2016–17	Sneyd Park	Jersey Rangers	Old Cliftonians Reserves	Jersey Rangers Reserves
2017–18	Sneyd Park	Sneyd Park Reserves	Sneyd Park A	Cotham old Boys
2018–19	Sneyd Park	St Andrews	Sneyd Park A	APS
2019-20
2020-21
2021–22	Sneyd Park	Sneyd Park Reserves	Sporting Turin	Phoenix Downs

== Member clubs 2022–23 season ==
=== Division One ===
- AFC Bohemia
- Ashley
- Clifton St. Vincents
- Jersey Rangers
- Portland Old Boys
- Retainers
- Saints Old Boys
- Sneyd Park
- Sporting Greyhounds
- Torpedo

=== Division Two ===
- Bengal Tigers
- Clifton St. Vincents Reserves
- Durdham Down AS
- Evergreen Athletic
- Old Cliftonians
- Saints Old Boys Reserves
- Sneyd Park Reserves
- Sporting Turin
- Torpedo Reserves

=== Division Three ===
- Clifton St. Vincents 'A'
- Cotham Old Boys
- Helios
- NCSF United
- Phoenix Downs
- Portland Old Boys Reserves
- Saints Old Boys 'A'
- Sneyd Park 'A'
- Sporting Greyhounds Reserves
- Torpedo 'A'

=== Division Four ===
- Clifton St. Vincents 'B'
- Clifton Vale
- Jersey Rangers Reserves
- NCSF United Reserves
- Portland Old Boys 'A'
- Racing Mouse
- Retainers Reserves
- Saints Old Boys 'B'
- Sneyd Park 'B'
- Torpedo 'B'
