= George Richards (Southern League footballer) =

English footballer

Personal information
- Place of birth: Pill, Somerset, England
- Position: Forward

Senior career*
Years	Team	Apps	(Gls)
1911–1913	Bristol Rovers	28	(10)
- * Club domestic league appearances and goals

George Richards was an English professional footballer who played in the Southern League for Bristol Rovers prior to the First World War.

Richards was originally from Pill, near Bristol, and joined Bristol Rovers in 1911. He scored ten times in 28 league games, playing in both the centre forward and inside left positions during a spell that ended in 1913, and was the club's joint top goalscorer with Billy Peplow in the 1911–12 season.
