= 1886–87 Eastville Rovers F.C. season =

Eastville Rovers
1886–87 season
- Captain: Fred Channing
- Ground: The Downs, Bristol

The 1886–87 season was the fourth to be played by the team that are now known as Bristol Rovers, and their third playing under the name Eastville Rovers.

== Season review ==
As with each of their previous three seasons, Eastville Rovers continued to play only friendly matches this year, but the "dribbling code" (as it was sometimes called at the time) of football was now gaining in popularity and the club were beginning to play against a wider variety of opposition. New team colours of Oxford and Cambridge blue were adopted, although the precise design of the kit is not documented.

Two Eastville Rovers players took part in an unusual match on New Year's Day, when Clifton Association took on a Rest of Bristol XI in Warmley. The Rest of Bristol team consisted of players from Warmley, St George and Eastville Rovers, and included Rovers pair W. Perrin and H. Horsey in the forward line.

Eastville Rovers were still not particularly well-known at this point, as evidenced by the fact that Weston-super-Mare RFC arranged two matches against them believing them to be a rugby team. Later, when Weston discovered that Rovers were an association football club, the games were cancelled.

Most of the results from this season are not known, but of the games where a result is documented Rovers recorded three wins, two draws and a defeat.

== Results ==
=== First team ===
Date	Opponent	Venue	Result	Notes
23 October 1886	Warmley	The Downs, Bristol	Won 1–0	Won by one goal and one disputed goal
30 October 1886	Clifton Association	The Downs, Bristol		
6 November 1886	Clevedon	Clevedon, Somerset	Lost 0–3	
27 November 1886	St Mathias	The Downs, Bristol		
4 December 1886	Bridgwater	The Downs, Bristol		
11 December 1886	St George	St George, Bristol	Drew 1–1	
18 December 1886	St Agnes	Ashley Down, Bristol		
8 January 1887	St George	St George, Bristol	Won 3-2	see Bristol Mercury 10 Jan 1886
22 January 1886	Clevedon	The Downs, Bristol	Drew 0-0	see Weston S Mare Gazette 29 Jan 1887
29 January 1887	Clifton Association	The Downs, Bristol	Lost 3-2	
5 February 1887	Chippenham	Chippenham, Wiltshire	Won 2–1	
12 February 1887	St George	The Downs, Bristol	Won 2–0	
19 February 1887	Warmley	Warmley, Gloucestershire	Drew 1–1	
5 March 1887	Bridgwater	Bridgwater		
12 March 1887	St Mathias	The Downs, Bristol		
26 March 1887	Clifton Association	Clifton		
2 April 1887	Weston-super-Mare	The Recreation Grounds, Weston-super-Mare	Won 3-1	see Bristol Mercury 5 April 1887

=== Second team ===
Date	Opponent	Venue	Result	Notes
13 November 1886	Warmley 2nd XI	Warmley, Gloucestershire		
20 November 1886	Warmley 2nd XI	The Downs, Bristol		
18 December 1886	St Mathias	The Downs, Bristol		
1 January 1887	Clifton Association 2nd XI	Clifton, Bristol		
22 January 1887	St Mathias	The Downs, Bristol	Won 2-0	see Bristol Mercury 24 Jan 1887

== Bibliography ==
- Byrne, Stephen; Jay, Mike (2003). Bristol Rovers Football Club: The Definitive History 1883–2003. Stroud: Tempus. ISBN 0-7524-2717-2.
