= Vic Lambden =

English footballer

Personal information
- Full name: Victor David Lambden
- Date of birth: 25 October 1925
- Place of birth: Bristol, England
- Date of death: 4 July 1996 (aged 70)
- Place of death: Bristol, England
- Position: Forward

Senior career*
Years	Team	Apps	(Gls)
????–1945	Oldland Abbotonians		
1945–1955	Bristol Rovers	269	(117)
1955–1961	Trowbridge Town		
- * Club domestic league appearances and goals

Victor David Lambden (25 October 1925 – 4 July 1996) was an English professional footballer who played for Bristol Rovers in the Football League.

He played for a local amateur side before joining Bristol Rovers in 1945. Lamden was a prolific goalscorer during his ten years with the club. After his professional career, he returned to amateur football.

== Early and personal life ==
Lambden was born in Keynsham in 1925 to parents Arthur Lambden and Ethel Chinn, and was the youngest of four children. He had two older sisters (Joan and Frances) and one brother (Graham).

Lambden married Bristol Rovers fan Grace Ford at St Anne's Church in Oldland on 28 February 1949. His brother Graham served as best man for the ceremony.

== Career ==
Lambden began his footballing career playing for his local team, Oldland Abbotonians, before joining Bristol Rovers in 1945. He went on to make 269 appearances in the Football League over the next ten years, scoring 117 goals.

Lambden made the best of starts to his Football League career, scoring on his debut for Rovers in the opening game of the 1946–47 season. This game, a 2–2 draw against Reading, also marked the return of League football after it was suspended during World War II.

On 19 March 1948, Lambden broke the Bristol Rovers club record for the fastest hat-trick in a match. His nine-minute treble (the goals coming in the 18th, 25th and 27th minutes) in a game against Aldershot remained the club's fastest until Dai Ward scored a four-minute hat-track in 1956. As of 2016, Lambden's remains the joint second-fastest in the club's history.

By the end of his time with Rovers Lambden was the club's all-time second-highest goalscorer, behind his teammate Geoff Bradford. His 117-goal tally was later surpassed by Alfie Biggs and Harold Jarman, but he remains the fourth on the club's top goalscorers list into the 21st century. Over the period of his time playing at Eastville, Lambden had become widely known for his successful partnership with fellow forward Bradford, and the pair later died just eighteen months apart from each other.

After retiring from professional football, Lambden dropped out of the league to play for Trowbridge Town.

== Bibliography ==
- Byrne, Stephen; Jay, Mike (2003). Bristol Rovers Football Club: The Definitive History 1883–2003. Stroud: Tempus. ISBN 0-7524-2717-2.
- Byrne, Stephen; Jay, Mike (2014). Bristol Rovers: The Official Definitive History. Stroud: Amberley. ISBN 9781445636191.
- Hugman, Barry J., ed. (2015). PFA Premier & Football League Players' Records 1946–2015. Reigate: G2 Entertainment. ISBN 978-1-7828-1167-1.
