= The Downs Festival =

Annual art festival in Bristol, England

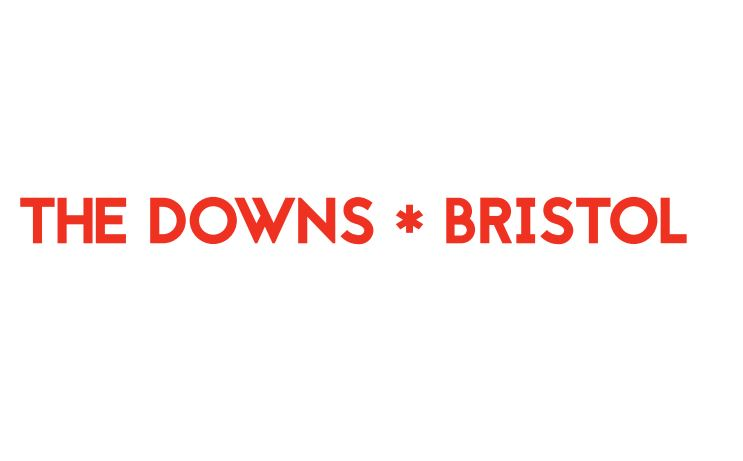
- Date: Late August/Early September
- Frequency: annually
- Locations: The Downs, Bristol
- Inaugurated: September 4, 2016
- Previous event: September 3 - 5, 2021 (with Love Saves The Day)
- Attendance: 20,000 - 30,000 (estimated)
- Website: thedownsbristol.com

The Downs Festival is a (usually) two day arts festival which takes place annually on the Downs in Bristol, England. The first event was held on September 4, 2016 with the headliner being the Bristol-based trip-hop band Massive Attack.

Over the years, it has hosted the likes of Elbow, Groove Armada, Noel Gallagher's High Flying Birds and IDLES.

== History ==
=== 2016 ===
2016 was the inception of what is now known as The Downs Festival. This event had the trip-hop band Massive Attack headlining, with other acts including Primal Scream, Skepta and Savages. This year was also plagued by inclement weather, with there being a torrential downpour for most of the day - this has been described as "the foulest weather I have ever encountered outside of a sci-fi film" by a reviewer.

=== 2017 ===
The headliner for 2017 was the British rock band Elbow. Other acts for this year included De La Soul, Mike Skinner, and Seasick Steve. This time round, the weather proved to be much more promising, with "a colourful helter skelter" and "acres of food vans".

=== 2018 ===
This year held Noel Gallagher's High Flying Birds (and Paul Weller), The Heavy, Goldie, and Basement Jaxx. This year, there were problems with queuing for toilets and adequate bins, as one attendee would describe it as "this event took the form of lining up for the bogs (that and bin-dodging, as the carpet of crushed, crunching cans underfoot)"

=== 2019 ===
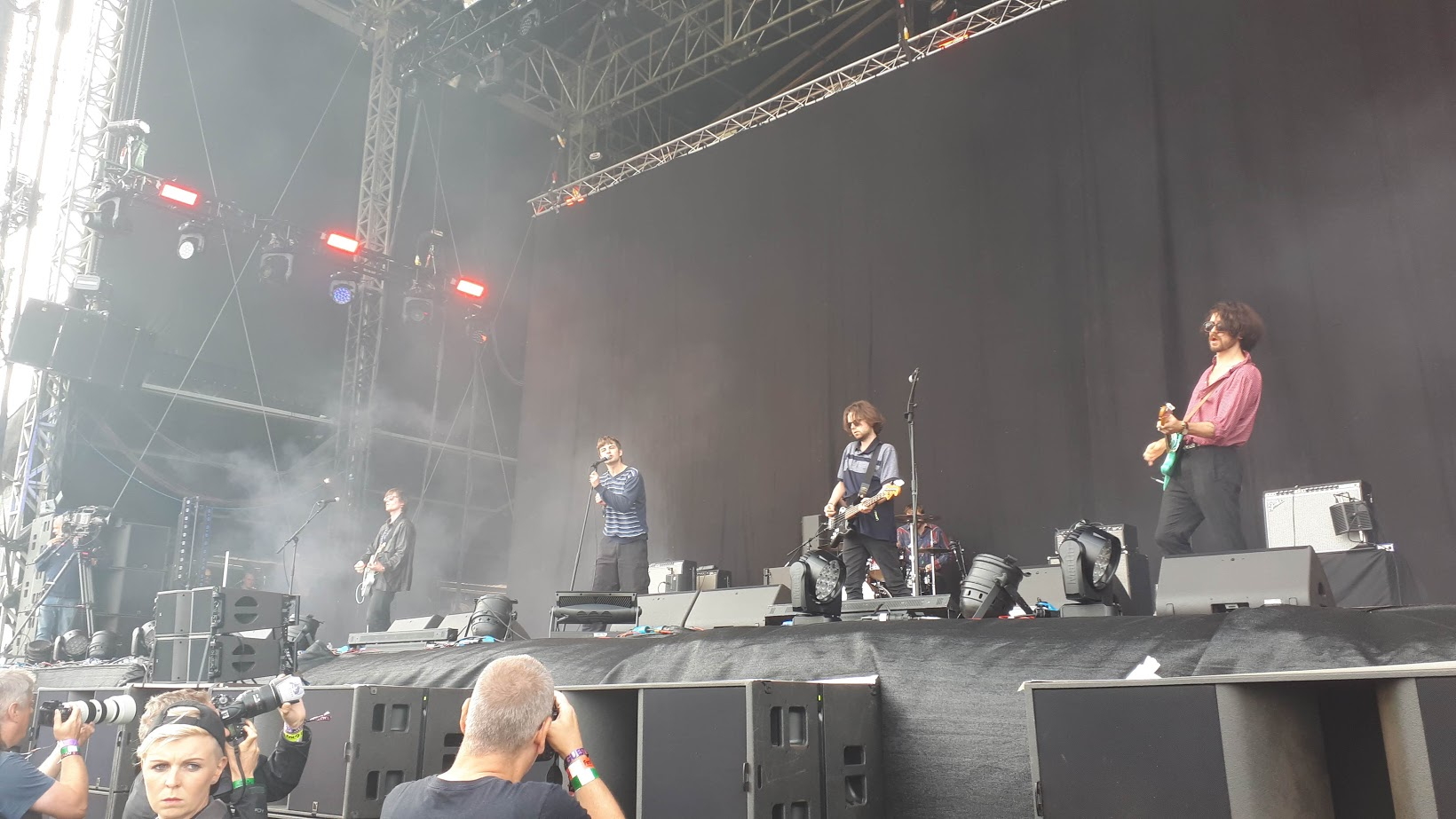
Fontaines D.C performing on the main stage at The Downs.

The most recent occurrence of the festival was during the final weekend of August 2019. This year saw the Bristol-based punk rock band IDLES and Irish post-punk band Fontaines D.C., with Lauryn Hill and Grace Jones headlining the Saturday night. Other acts included Heavy Lungs on the Information Stage joined by DITZ, Talk Show and Milo's Planes.
