= Syd Leigh =

English footballer

Personal information
- Full name: Alfred Sydney Leigh
- Date of birth: 23 June 1893
- Place of birth: Shardlow, England
- Date of death: after 1958
- Position: Forward

Senior career*
Years	Team	Apps	(Gls)
- Osmaston
	Derby County	2	(0)
1920–1922	Bristol Rovers	68	(36)
Total		70	(36)
- * Club domestic league appearances and goals

Alfred Sydney Leigh (August 1893 – after 1958) was an English professional footballer who played in The Football League for Derby County and Bristol Rovers.

== Career ==
His first club was Osmaston, who played near his home town of Shardlow in Derbyshire, and from there he joined Derby County. He played twice for The Rams during the 1919–20 season, before moving to play for Bristol Rovers in their first two seasons in the Football League. He was the first player to score four goals in a League game for the Bristol side, and scored a total of 36 goals from 70 games for them. In spite of this impressive goal return he was unable to find another Football League club to play for when he returned home to Derbyshire in 1922 due to being unable to settle in the West Country.
