= Billy Peplow =

English footballer

Personal information
- Full name: William Watling Peplow
- Date of birth: 1885
- Place of birth: Derby, England
- Date of death: Unknown
- Position: Outside right

Senior career*
Years	Team	Apps	(Gls)
- Redditch
1907–1908	Birmingham	17	(0)
1908–1915	Bristol Rovers	216	(42)
- * Club domestic league appearances and goals

William Watling Peplow (1885 – after 1914) was an English professional footballer who played in the Football League for Birmingham and in the Southern League for Bristol Rovers. He played as an outside right.

Peplow was born in Derby, and played for Redditch before he joined Birmingham in April 1907. He made his debut in the First Division on 16 September 1907 in a 1–0 defeat at Bury. Peplow played 17 games in his one season with Birmingham, but failed to score and seemed lacking in pace, though the quality of his crossing was good. He moved to the Southern League with Bristol Rovers in 1908, and improved so much that he was invited for a trial for the England team, but he was not selected. In seven seasons, before the First World War put an end to his career, Peplow scored 42 goals in 216 Southern League appearances.
