= Alfie Biggs =

English footballer (1936–2012)

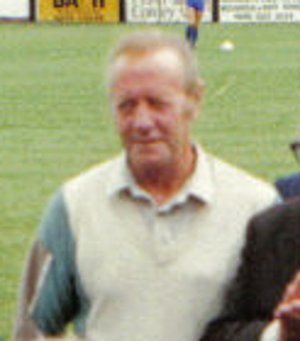
- Biggs in 1988

Personal information
- Date of birth: 8 February 1936
- Place of birth: Bristol, England
- Date of death: 20 April 2012 (aged 76)
- Place of death: Poole, Dorset, England
- Position: Forward

Senior career*
Years	Team	Apps	(Gls)
1953–1961	Bristol Rovers	214	(77)
1961–1962	Preston North End	49	(22)
1962–1968	Bristol Rovers	210	(101)
1968–1969	Walsall	24	(9)
1969	Swansea Town	16	(4)
- Taunton Town
- * Club domestic league appearances and goals

Alfred George 'Alfie' Biggs (8 February 1936 – 20 April 2012) was an English professional footballer, who spent the vast majority of his career at Bristol Rovers.

Biggs grew up as one of eight children in the Knowle West area of Bristol where he attended Ilminster Avenue and Connaught Road schools.

Nicknamed "The Baron" Biggs played as a forward who scored a total of 211 goals in The Football League. He began his career at Bristol Rovers, starting out as a junior at the club before progressing to the first team in 1953 at the age of seventeen. He played for the club for eight years before heading north to play for Preston North End for a single season. He returned to his home city of Bristol in 1962 for a further six years. His final season as a professional footballer was 1968–69, during which he spent time with Bristol Rovers, Walsall and Swansea Town. After this he dropped out of the league to play for Taunton Town.

Biggs died at the age 76 at his home in Poole, Dorset.

On 19 March 2021, Biggs became the fourth player to be inducted into the newly created Bristol Rovers Hall of Fame.

== Sources ==
- "Alfie Biggs". Post War English & Scottish Football League A - Z Player's Transfer Database.
- Byrne, Stephen; Jay, Mike (2003). Bristol Rovers Football Club - The Definitive History 1883-2003. Stroud: Tempus. ISBN 0-7524-2717-2.
- "ALFIE BIGGS". bristolrovers.co.uk. 22 April 2012. Archived from the original on 25 April 2012.
