= Bruce Bannister (footballer) =

English footballer

Personal information
- Full name: Bruce Ian Bannister
- Date of birth: 14 April 1947 (age 79)
- Place of birth: Bradford, England
- Position: Striker

Youth career
- Leeds United
- 1963–1965: Bradford City

Senior career*
Years	Team	Apps	(Gls)
1965–1971	Bradford City	208	(60)
1971–1976	Bristol Rovers	206	(80)
1976–1977	Plymouth Argyle	24	(7)
1977–1980	Hull City	85	(20)
1980–1982	USL Dunkerque		
Total		523	(167)
- * Club domestic league appearances and goals

Bruce Ian Bannister (born 14 April 1947) is an English retired professional footballer who played as a striker, and is also a businessperson in sports shoe and apparel sales and distribution.

== Football career ==
Born in Bradford, Bannister played for Leeds United, Bradford City, Bristol Rovers, Plymouth Argyle, Hull City and USL Dunkerque.

At Bradford City, he was known for scoring a "wonder goal" in 1968, an overhead kick.

While at Bristol Rovers, Bannister and teammate Alan Warboys developed the 'Smash and Grab' method of football.

== Business career ==
Sportsshoes.com logo

Bannister founded Sportsshoes in 1982. In 1985, Sportsshoes launched its mail order service, and later became one of the first retailers to launch an e-commerce website. The business was later taken over by Bannister's son Brett, and became an exclusively online and mail order operation.
