= Hampden Alpass =

English cricketer

Personal information
- Full name: Herbert John Hampden Alpass
- Born: 7 August 1906; Berkeley, England
- Died: 16 March 1999 (aged 92); Southmead, England
- Batting: Right-handed
- Bowling: Slow left-arm orthodox

Domestic team information
- Years: Team
- 1926–1928: Gloucestershire

Career statistics
Competition	First-class
Matches	7
Runs scored	36
Batting average	5.14
100s/50s	0/0
Top score	18*
Balls bowled	204
Wickets	4
Bowling average	28.50
5 wickets in innings	0
10 wickets in match	0
Best bowling	2/42
Catches/stumpings	3/–
- Source: CricketArchive (subscription required), 9 August 2008

Herbert John Hampden Alpass (7 August 1906 – 16 March 1999) was an English first-class cricketer who played in seven matches between 1926 and 1928 for Gloucestershire. His highest score of 18* came when playing for Gloucestershire in the 1928 match against Oxford University Cricket Club. His best bowling of 2/42 came in the same match.

Alpass studied at Clifton College in Bristol and starred as a left-arm spinner in the college cricket team. Away from cricket, Alpass qualified as a solicitor and became chairman of Bristol Rovers Football Club in 1950. He spent 11 years as chairman, overseeing promotion to Division Two in 1953.
