= Purdown =

Hill in Bristol, England

Coordinates: 51°29′13″N 2°33′36″W

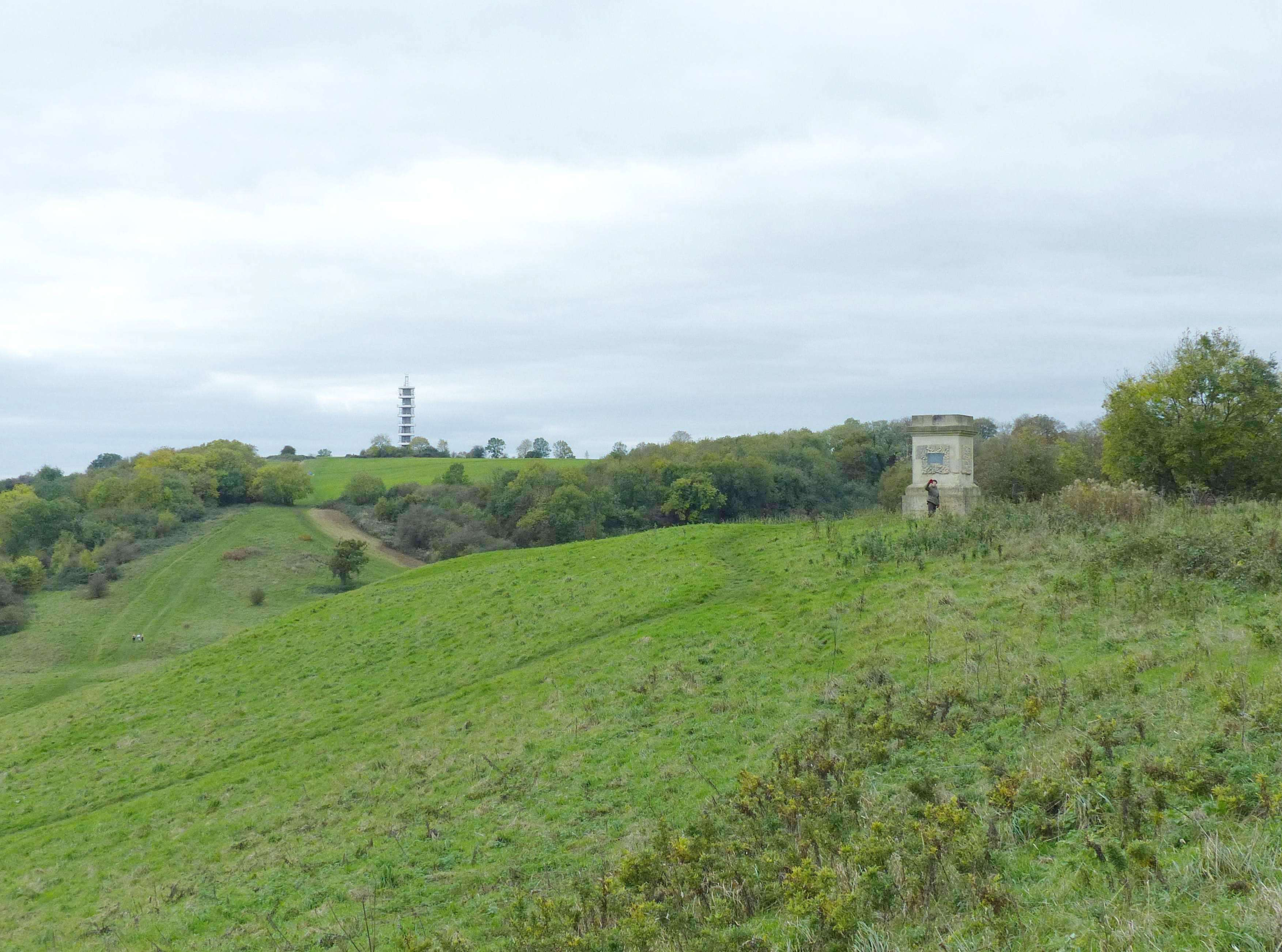
The grassy slopes of Purdown. This part is Stoke Park. The Purdown BT Tower and an obelisk base commemorating a death are visible.

Purdown (sometimes spelt Pur Down) is a hill in the north east of Bristol, England. The suburb of Lockleaze lies on its western flanks, while its south-eastern slopes reach into Eastville and include a Priory Group hospital, Fairfield High School, allotment gardens and a recreation area. Much of the ridgetop and eastern flank of the hill is public open space, part of the Stoke Park estate.

Muller Road crosses the southern end of the hill, while the M32 motorway runs along the lower slopes to the east.

The Purdown BT Tower is constructed near the highest point of the hill.
