= The Downs, Bristol =

Public Parkland in Bristol

The Downs
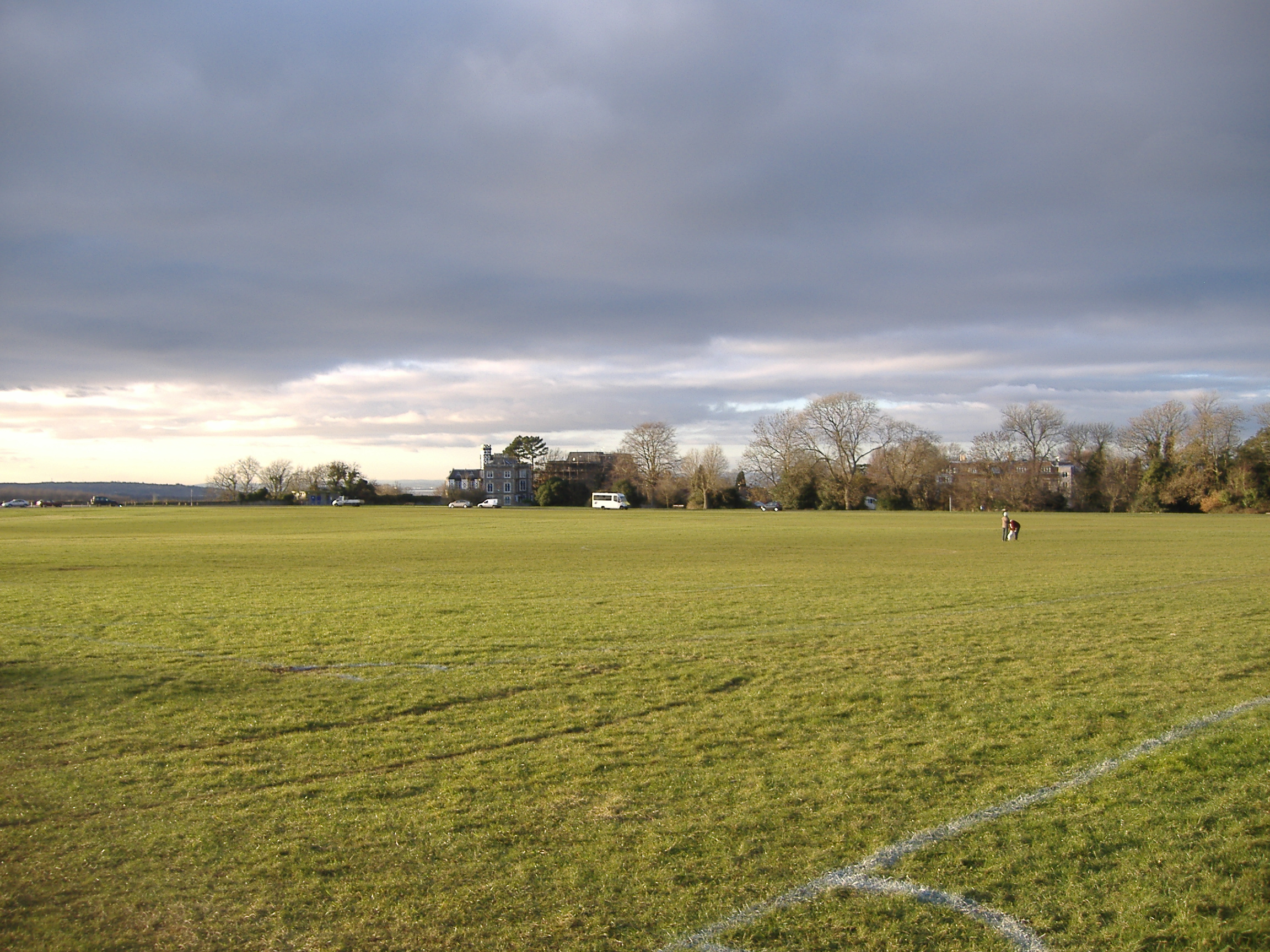
- Interactive map of The Downs
- Type: public open space
- Location: Bristol, England
- Coordinates: 51°28′N 2°38′W
- Area: 412 acres (1.7 km^{2})
- Status: open all year

Location of The Downs in Bristol

The Downs are an area of public open limestone downland in Bristol, England. They consist of Durdham Down to the north and east and Clifton Down to the south. They are used for leisure, walking, team sports and sightseeing (especially at the Avon Gorge cliff edge).

A grey concrete water tower of 1954 stands on the Downs near the top of Blackboy Hill, with a long, low, covered reservoir alongside it.

== Durdham Down ==
Durdham Down is the north and east part of the Downs, extending to Westbury Park and Henleaze, with an area of 85 hectares (210 acres). It is owned by Bristol City Council for the benefit of the people of Bristol.

== Clifton Down ==
Clifton Down is the southern part of the Downs, next to Clifton and extending to the edge of the Avon Gorge, with an area of 82 hectares (202 acres). It is owned by the Society of Merchant Venturers.

== Management ==
Clifton and Durdham Downs (Bristol) Act 1861
- Act of Parliament
- Parliament of the United Kingdom
- Long title: An Act to enable the Corporation of the City of Bristol to purchase Durdham Down, and to secure Durdham Down and Clifton Down as Places for public Recreation.
- Citation: 24 & 25 Vict. c. xiv

Dates
- Royal assent: 17 May 1861

Text of statute as originally enacted

Ministry of Health Provisional Order Confirmation (Bristol) Act 1936
- Act of Parliament
- Parliament of the United Kingdom
- Long title: An Act to confirm a Provisional Order of the Minister of Health relating to the city of Bristol.
- Citation: 26 Geo. 5 & 1 Edw. 8. c. xxxiv

Dates
- Royal assent: 29 May 1936

Other legislation
- Repealed by: County of Avon Act 1982

Status: Repealed

Text of statute as originally enacted

Since the Clifton and Durdham Downs (Bristol) Act 1861 (24 & 25 Vict. c. xiv), when Bristol Corporation acquired Durdham Down, the Downs have been managed as a single unit by the Downs Committee, a joint committee of the corporation and the Merchant Venturers. The act was later updated by the Bristol Order 1931, confirmed by the Ministry of Health Provisional Orders Confirmation (Bristol and Leicester) Act 1931 (21 & 22 Geo. 5. c. lxxxi), and the Bristol Order 1936 confirmed by the Ministry of Health Provisional Order Confirmation (Bristol) Act 1936 (26 Geo. 5 & 1 Edw. 8. c. xxxiv). They have been designated common land since the early 1970s by Bristol City Council.

== Events ==
There are permanent football pitches, used by the Bristol Downs Football League. There are also temporary attractions on the Downs, such as circuses and (until 2006) the annual Bristol Flower Show. Since 2016 it has been the site of The Downs Festival, an annual music festival with both local and nationally known bands attending.

In 1982 6,000 people assembled on the Downs in response to a local newspaper advertisement placed by the makers of the new breakfast television show TV-am. The 6,000 people were used to make the words 'Good', 'Morning' and 'Britain', used for the opening titles of the show. It took 2 hours to get them into place and another 2 hours to shoot.

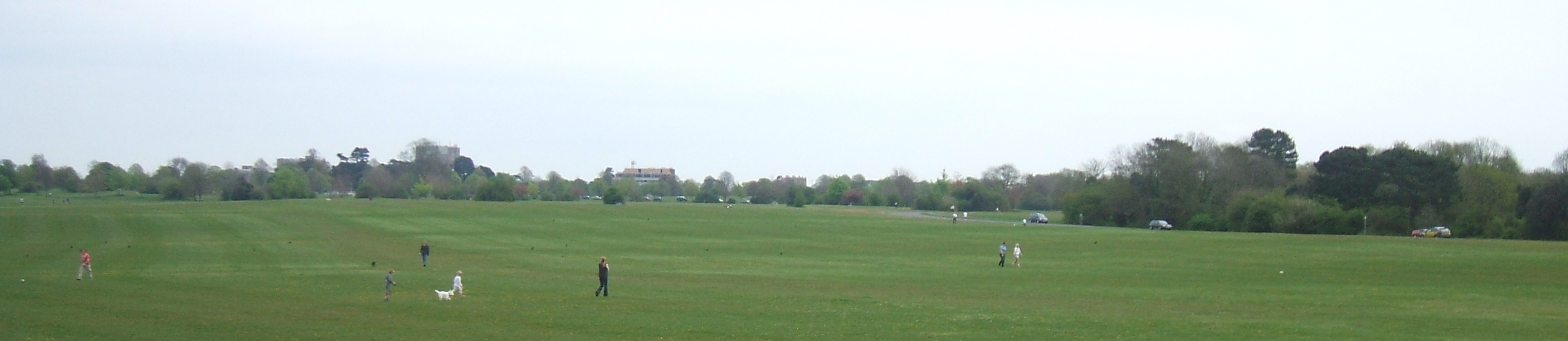
Panorama over the downs

== In popular culture ==
The Downs played a significant role in Jack Thorne's 2018 Channel 4 mini-series Kiri.

== Gallery ==
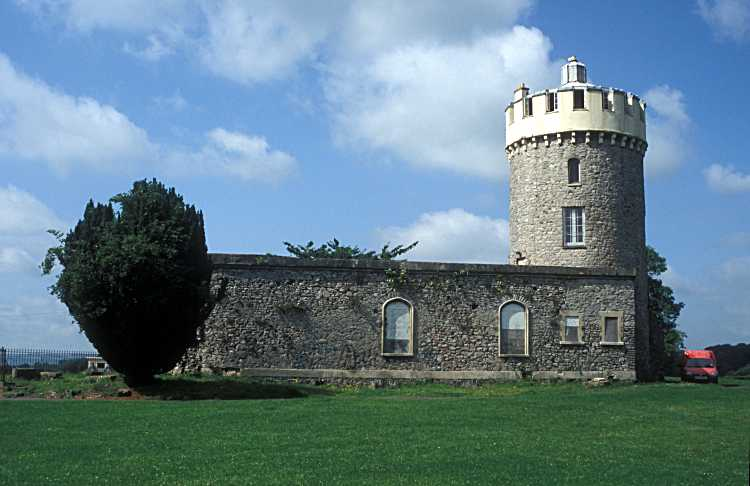
The Observatory on Clifton Down gives a dramatic view of the Avon Gorge

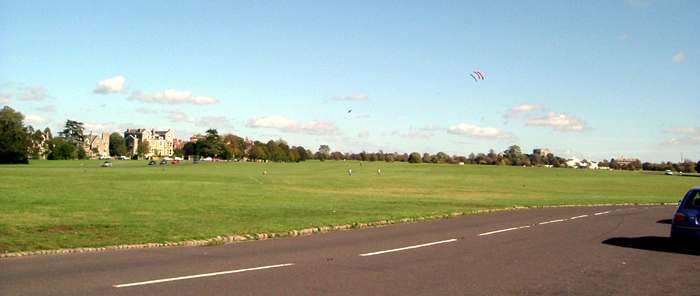
Kites on the Downs in early autumn

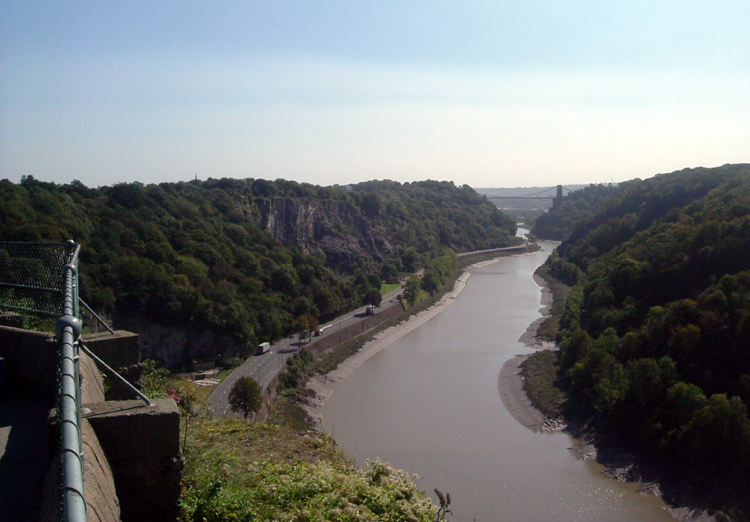
The Avon Gorge from the Downs
