= 1898–99 Southampton F.C. season =

Southampton F.C.
1898–99 season
- Chairman: Dr. Ernest Stancomb
- Secretary: Er Arnfield
- Stadium: The Dell
- Southern League: Champions
- FA Cup: Round 3
- Top goalscorer: League: Harry Wood (16); All: Harry Wood & Abe Hartley (16)
- Highest home attendance: 14,000 vs Derby County (25 February 1899) (FA Cup)
Home colours

The 1898–99 season was the 14th since the foundation of Southampton F.C. and their fifth in league football, as members of the Southern League.

They ended the season as champions of the Southern League for the third consecutive season and reached the Third Round of the FA Cup where they were eliminated by Derby County of the Football League First Division.

== Pre-season ==
Having spent two seasons as temporary residents of Hampshire County Cricket Club, the "Saints" became resident at a new stadium about 200 yards down Northlands Road, nicknamed "The Dell", which had been built by George Thomas, a fish merchant who was a director of the football club. At the time of its opening, The Dell was considered to be the most compact ground in the country — the players got their first taste of their new home when they participated in a sports meeting there on 27 August 1898.

Determined to build on their success of the previous season, the club signed several new players during the summer of 1898, including five present or former internationals — Scotsmen Geordie Dewar, Peter Meechan and John Robertson and Englishmen Jack Robinson and Harry Wood. Robinson, the current England goalkeeper, and Robertson had played against each other in the Scotland vs. England international at Celtic Park on 2 April 1898, in which England were 3–1 victors, thus claiming the 1898 British Home Championship.

== League season ==
The first league season in the new ground started on 3 September 1898, with a match against Brighton United, who were playing their first-ever league match. On a hot Saturday afternoon, in front of a crowd of 6,524, the Mayor of Southampton (Alderman G.J. Tilling) kicked off "like an international". The Saints soon took the lead when with "a little finessing", Tom Smith passed the ball through to Watty Keay who scored The Dell's first goal. Jim McKenzie missed some good chances and, with Southampton attacking in numbers, Bullimer in the Brighton goal was kept busy. Towards the end of the first-half, Arthur Chadwick accidentally caught Brighton's centre-forward Willie McArthur on the chin with a high kick. Bleeding profusely, McArthur left the pitch and Brighton had to continue with only ten men. Shortly before the interval, Abe Hartley scored the second goal, after a smart run up the left by McKenzie. In the second half, McKenzie added a third before Roddy McLeod reduced the deficit. With over a quarter of an hour to play, Smith completed the scoring, with a goal described as "just such a goal as there is no doubt about – a shot which beats the goalkeeper almost before it is made".

Despite having signed five present or former international players during the summer, Southampton were unable to dominate the league as they had done in the previous year, losing their second match to New Brompton and drawing four matches before the New Year. In November, the referee, Mr. T.W.H. Saywell, mistakenly ended the match at Millwall ten minutes early with Southampton leading 4–1. He soon realised his error and tried to bring the teams back to complete the match, but the crowd had invaded the pitch and refused to leave. The match was completed five months later on 12 April 1899 before a Western League match at The Dell, with no further score.

On 3 December, the Saints defeated Warmley 6–0 at The Dell, but this result was expunged when Warmley withdrew from the league before the end of the season. Reserve goalkeeper, John Joyce made his "debut" in this match, but with the result being expunged, had to wait until 21 October 1899 before his official debut. The New Year started with two away defeats; in the match at Sheppey United on 7 January, Arthur Chadwick was dismissed, becoming the first Southampton player to be sent off in a league match.

The Saints won five of the next seven games and entered the last day of the season level on points with Bristol City, their final-day opponents. Bristol City were playing their second season in the Southern League having finished as runners-up in 1897–98, and were undefeated at their St John's Lane ground. Southampton had the superior goal average, so a draw would give them the title for the third time.

A crowd of 13,000 attended the match, including 400 Saints' supporters. Early in the game, England international goalkeeper Jack Robinson damaged his right hand, attempting to prevent a goal from Billy Langham, City's outside-right. Whilst Robinson was receiving medical attention, Harry Haynes took over in goal, preventing further goals until Robinson's return. Robinson played on in considerable pain but was unable to prevent the ball entering the goal off the cross bar from a Langham free-kick; thus the first half ended with Bristol City having a 2–0 lead.

For the second half, Southampton made a tactical change, switching Roddy McLeod to centre-forward with Duncan McLean moving to inside-right and within 12 minutes of the restart the scores were level, after long shots from Arthur Chadwick and Jock Robertson, the latter going in after a "gentle hint" from Harry Wood turned the ball past goalkeeper, Hugh Monteith who had come too far out of his goal. The Southampton fullbacks continued to protect Robinson in goal and the Saints gradually began to have the better of the game. A move involving Robertson and Wood ended with McLean giving Southampton the lead before Wood scored the fourth goal, with a simple header from a corner. Although Caie pulled one back for the home side, Southampton were able to hang on to their lead to win 4–3 and take the Championship for the third consecutive season.

The news of the result had reached Southampton by telegraph and when the team's special train arrived at the Docks station at 10.30pm, it was greeted by huge crowds of enthusiastic supporters who cheered the team on their victory parade through the streets of the town, accompanied by the Town Band.

== League results ==
Note: Southampton score given first

Date	Opponents	H / A	Result F – A	Scorers
3 September 1898	Brighton United	H	4 – 1	Keay, Hartley, McKenzie, Smith
17 September 1898	New Brompton	H	0 – 2	
24 September 1898	Gravesend United	A	2 – 1	Hartley, Petrie
1 October 1898	Millwall Athletic	H	2 – 0	Wood (2)
8 October 1898	Royal Artillery	H	4 – 1	Hartley, McKenzie, Meston, Wood
15 October 1898	Reading	H	0 – 0	
22 October 1898	Swindon Town	A	1 – 1	Hartley
5 November 1898	Gravesend United	H	4 – 1	Hartley, Keay, McKenzie, Wood
12 November 1898	Sheppey United	H	6 – 0	Wood (3), Hartley (2), Keay
26 November 1898	Millwall Athletic	A	4 – 1	Hartley (2), Chadwick, Keay
17 December 1898	Royal Artillery	A	1 – 1	Keay
24 December 1898	Swindon Town	H	4 – 1	Wood (2), Hartley, Keay
26 December 1898	Tottenham Hotspur	H	1 – 1	Wood
31 December 1898	Bedminster	H	1 – 0	Wood
7 January 1899	Sheppey United	A	1 – 2	Seeley
18 February 1899	Reading	A	0 – 2	
11 March 1899	Bristol City	H	4 – 1	Hartley (3), Nicol
18 March 1899	Chatham Town	H	4 – 1	Hartley, McLean, Wood, Own goal
27 March 1899	Brighton United	A	2 – 0	Steven (2)
31 March 1899	Tottenham Hotspur	A	1 – 0	Wood
4 April 1899	Bedminster	A	1 – 2	Haynes
22 April 1899	Chatham Town	A	2 – 1	McLean, Wood
24 April 1899	New Brompton	A	1 – 1	Haynes
29 April 1899	Bristol City	A	4 – 3	Wood (2), Chadwick, McLean

=== Legend ===
Win	Draw	Loss

=== Top of league table ===
Pos	Team	Pld	W	D	L	GF	GA	GR	Pts
1	Southampton	24	15	5	4	54	24	2.250	35
2	Bristol City	24	15	3	6	55	33	1.667	33
3	Millwall Athletic	24	12	6	6	59	35	1.686	30
4	Chatham Town	24	10	8	6	32	23	1.391	28
5	Reading	24	9	8	7	31	24	1.292	26

Source: rsssf.com
Rules for classification: The system of using goal average to separate two teams tied on points was used until the 1976-77 season. The points system: 2 points for a win, 1 point for a draw and 0 points for losing.

== FA Cup ==
Southampton were excused the qualifying competition of the FA Cup, having reached the semi-finals in the previous year. In Round One, they met fellow Southern League side, New Brompton, with Abe Hartley scoring the winner 20 minutes from time. In the Second Round, Hartley was again the goalscorer, "dribbling through a bewildered Notts County defence before scoring with a glorious shot".

This set up the first FA Cup match to be played at The Dell, against Derby County of the Football League First Division, who were the beaten finalists from the previous year. Although Tom Nicol scored the first-ever FA Cup goal at The Dell, goals from Steve Bloomer and Billy McDonald eased Derby through, on their way to another final.

=== FA Cup results ===
Date	Round	Opponents	H / A	Result F – A	Scorers	Attendance
28 January 1899	Round 1	New Brompton	A	1 – 0	Hartley	5,000
11 February 1899	Round 2	Notts County	A	1 – 0	Hartley	18,000
25 February 1899	Round 3	Derby County	H	1 – 2	Nicol	14,000

== Friendly matches ==
Towards the end of the season, Southampton played a series of friendly matches against the Corinthians — the first two (both played away) were drawn, but the third the famous amateur side visited The Dell on 1 April 1899. Amongst the Corinthian XI was C.B. Fry, who charged Robinson in the Saints' goal late in the first half, fracturing his own cheekbone. Although he received treatment from the Southampton club president, Dr. Bencraft, Fry was unable to continue and had to be helped from the pitch. Despite playing on with only ten men, the Corinthians still managed to win 2–1.

Two days later, Southampton entertained Rangers, the newly crowned Scottish Football League champions, with the Saints going down by the single goal.

== Player statistics ==
Position	Nationality	Name	League apps	League goals	FA Cup apps	FA Cup goals	Total apps	Total goals
FW	Scotland	Robert Buchanan	2	0	0	0	2	0
FW	England	Sid Cavendish	0	0	0	0	0	0
HB	England	Arthur Chadwick	17	2	0	0	17	2
HB	Scotland	Geordie Dewar	4	0	0	0	4	0
FB	England	Peter Durber	16	0	3	0	19	0
HB	England	Frank Englefield	0	0	0	0	0	0
FW	Scotland	Walter Fairgrieve	1	0	0	0	1	0
FW	Scotland	Abe Hartley	21	14	3	2	24	16
FB	England	Harry Haynes	21	2	3	0	24	2
GK	England	John Joyce	0	0	0	0	0	0
FW	Scotland	Watty Keay	10	6	3	0	13	6
FW	Scotland	Jim McKenzie	6	3	0	0	6	3
FW	Scotland	Duncan McLean	8	3	0	0	8	3
FW	Scotland	Roddy McLeod	3	0	0	0	3	0
FB	Scotland	Peter Meechan	15	0	3	0	18	0
FB	Scotland	Samuel Meston	18	1	3	0	21	1
FB	Scotland	Tom Nicol	8	1	3	1	11	2
HB	Scotland	Bob Petrie	9	1	3	0	12	1
HB	Scotland	John Robertson	19	0	3	0	22	0
GK	England	Jack Robinson	24	0	3	0	27	0
FW	England	George Seeley	8	1	0	0	8	1
FW	England	Tom Smith	14	1	0	0	14	1
HB	England	Victor Smith	0	0	0	0	0	0
FW	Scotland	David Steven	9	2	0	0	9	2
FW	England	Harry Wood	24	16	3	0	27	16
FW	England	Jimmy Yates	7	0	0	0	7	0

=== Key ===
- GK — Goalkeeper
- FB — Full back
- HB — Half back
- FW — Forward

== Transfers ==
=== In ===
Date	Position	Name	From
May 1898	FW	Sid Cavendish	Overseal Town
May 1898	HB	Geordie Dewar	New Brighton Tower
May 1898	FB	Peter Durber	Stoke
May 1898	FW	Frank Englefield	Freemantle
May 1898	FW	Walter Fairgrieve	Glasgow Perthshire
May 1898	FW	Abe Hartley	Liverpool
May 1898	GK	John Joyce	Overseal Town
Summer 1898	FW	Jim McKenzie	Clyde
February 1899	FW	Duncan McLean	Cowes
April 1899	FW	Roddy McLeod	Brighton United
August 1898	FB	Peter Meechan	Everton
May 1898	HB	John Robertson	Everton
August 1898	GK	Jack Robinson	New Brighton Tower
Summer 1898	FW	George Seeley	Eastville Rovers
Summer 1898	FW	Tom Smith	Preston North End
May 1898	FW	Harry Wood	Wolverhampton Wanderers

=== Departures ===
Date	Position	Name	To
Summer 1898	FW	Bob Brown	Queens Park Rangers
May 1898	GK	George Clawley	Stoke
Summer 1898	FW	Jack Farrell	Stoke
December 1898	FW	Jim McKenzie	Retired
Summer 1898	HB	William McMillan	Retired
Summer 1898	FW	Willie Naughton	Carfin Rovers
July 1898	FW	Jack Reynolds	Bristol St George
May 1898	FW	Joe Turner	Stoke

== Bibliography ==
- Bull, David; Brunskell, Bob (2000). Match of the Millennium. Hagiology Publishing. ISBN 0-9534474-1-3.
- Cavallini, Rob (2007). Play Up Corinth – A History of the Corinthian Football Club. Tempus Publishing. ISBN 0-7524-4479-4.
- Chalk, Gary; Holley, Duncan (1987). Saints – A complete record. Breedon Books. ISBN 0-907969-22-4.
- Collett, Mike (2003). The Complete Record of the FA Cup. Sports Books. ISBN 1-899807-19-5.
- Holley, Duncan; Chalk, Gary (1992). The Alphabet of the Saints. ACL & Polar Publishing. ISBN 0-9514862-3-3.
- Juson, Dave; Bull, David (2001). Full-Time at The Dell. Hagiology Publishing. ISBN 0-9534474-2-1.
- Wilton, Iain (2000). C.B. Fry: An English Hero. Metro Books. ISBN 978-1-86066-180-8.
