= 1898–99 Dundee F.C. season =

Dundee
1898–99 season
- Stadium: Carolina Port
- Division One: 10th
- Scottish Cup: 1st round
- Top goalscorer: League: Charlie Craig (4); All: Charlie Craig (4)
Home colours

The 1898–99 season was the sixth season in which Dundee competed at a Scottish national level, playing in Division One and finishing bottom in 10th place, but were not relegated due to re-election to Division One. Dundee would also compete in the Scottish Cup.

== Scottish Division One ==
Statistics provided by Dee Archive

Match day	Date	Opponent	H/A	Score	Dundee scorer(s)	Attendance
1	3 September	St Bernard's	H	1–1	McNichol (o.g.)	2,500
2	10 September	Clyde	A	0–1		4,000
3	17 September	Hibernian	H	2–4	McLay, Symers	5,000
4	24 September	Third Lanark	A	1–3	MacDonald	2,000
5	1 October	Partick Thistle	H	5–1	McLay, Gerrard (2), Methven, Bunce	2,500
6	8 October	Rangers	H	1–2	MacDonald	7,500
7	15 October	Hibernian	A	0–5		2,500
8	22 October	Third Lanark	H	1–3	Gardner (o.g.)	3,000
9	29 October	St Mirren	A	1–5	B. Turner	2,500
10	5 November	St Mirren	H	1–7	T. McDonald	3,000
11	12 November	Clyde	H	1–3	J. Turner	2,000
12	19 November	Celtic	H	1–4	Craig	5,000
13	26 November	Heart of Midlothian	A	3–6	MacDonald, Craig (2)	1,500
14	3 December	Heart of Midlothian	H	2–5	Leckie, B. Turner	2,000
15	17 December	Rangers	A	0–7		3,000
16	24 December	St Bernard's	A	2–2	Stewart, Methven	500
17	31 December	Partick Thistle	A	0–2		
18	7 January	Celtic	A	1–4	Craig	800

=== League table ===
Pos	Team	Pld	W	D	L	GF	GA	GD	Pts	Qualification or relegation
6	Third Lanark	18	7	3	8	33	38	−5	17	
7	Clyde	18	4	4	10	23	48	−25	12	
7	St Bernard's	18	4	4	10	30	37	−7	12	
9	Partick Thistle (R)	18	2	2	14	19	58	−39	6	Relegated to the 1899–1900 Scottish Division Two
10	Dundee	18	1	2	15	23	65	−42	4	

Source: statto.com
Rules for classification: Teams finish equal if level on points. Points system: 2 points for a win, 1 point for a draw, 0 points for a loss
(R) Relegated

== Scottish Cup ==
Statistics provided by Dee Archive

Round	Date	Opponent	H/A	Score	Dundee scorer(s)	Attendance
1st round	14 January	Ayr Parkhouse	A	1–3	Brown	2,500

== Player statistics ==
Statistics provided by Dee Archive

No.	Pos	Nat	Player	Total		First Division		Scottish Cup	
No.	Pos	Nat	Player	Apps	Goals	Apps	Goals	Apps	Goals
	MF	(Scotland) SCO	John Bett	6	0	5	0	1	0
	MF	(Scotland) SCO	Alex Black	1	0	1	0	0	0
	FW	(Scotland) SCO	Alex Brown	2	1	1	0	1	1
	MF	(Scotland) SCO	John Bunce	4	1	4	1	0	0
	DF	(Scotland) SCO	Charlie Craig	7	4	7	4	0	0
	DF	(Scotland) SCO	Bill Davidson	14	0	14	0	0	0
	MF	(Scotland) SCO	John Dawson	1	0	1	0	0	0
	MF	(Scotland) SCO	Frank Ferrier	5	0	4	0	1	0
	MF	(Scotland) SCO	John Gerrard	10	2	9	2	1	0
	DF	(Scotland) SCO	James Ireland	8	0	7	0	1	0
	MF	(Scotland) SCO	Jimmy Jeffray	1	0	1	0	0	0
	MF	(Scotland) SCO	Sandy Keillor	18	0	17	0	1	0
	MF	(Scotland) SCO	Tom Leckie	10	1	10	1	0	0
	FW	(Scotland) SCO	Ed Lester	2	0	2	0	0	0
	MF	(Scotland) SCO	Billy Lyon	7	0	7	0	0	0
	FW	(Scotland) SCO	Billy MacDonald	14	3	14	3	0	0
	FW	(Scotland) SCO	Willie McColl	6	0	5	0	1	0
	FW	(Scotland) SCO	Tommy McDonald	9	1	9	1	0	0
	FW	(Scotland) SCO	James McLay	10	2	10	2	0	0
	FW	(Scotland) SCO	Stuart Methven	15	2	14	2	1	0
	DF	(Scotland) SCO	Ward Miller	1	0	1	0	0	0
	MF	(Scotland) SCO	George Philip	3	0	3	0	0	0
	FW	(Scotland) SCO	Jake Pollock	1	0	1	0	0	0
	GK	(Scotland) SCO	Billy Ritchie	5	0	5	0	0	0
	GK	(Scotland) SCO	Rod Roberts	1	0	1	0	0	0
	FW	(Scotland) SCO	James Robertson	1	0	1	0	0	0
	DF	(Scotland) SCO	Allan Scott	6	0	6	0	0	0
	DF	(Scotland) SCO	Jimmy Skene	7	0	6	0	1	0
	FW	(Scotland) SCO	Harry Stewart	5	1	4	1	1	0
	GK	(Scotland) SCO	Tom Stewart	15	0	14	0	1	0
	MF	(Scotland) SCO	Stewart Symers	3	1	3	1	0	0
	DF	(Scotland) SCO	Jim Thomson	1	0	1	0	0	0
	FW	(Scotland) SCO	Billy Turner	1	1	1	1	0	0
	MF	(Scotland) SCO	Jim Turner	6	2	6	2	0	0
	FW	(Scotland) SCO	Jake Pollock	1	1	1	1	0	0
	MF	(Scotland) SCO	George White	1	1	1	1	0	0

== See also ==
- List of Dundee F.C. seasons
