= Watty Keay =

Scottish footballer (1871-1943)

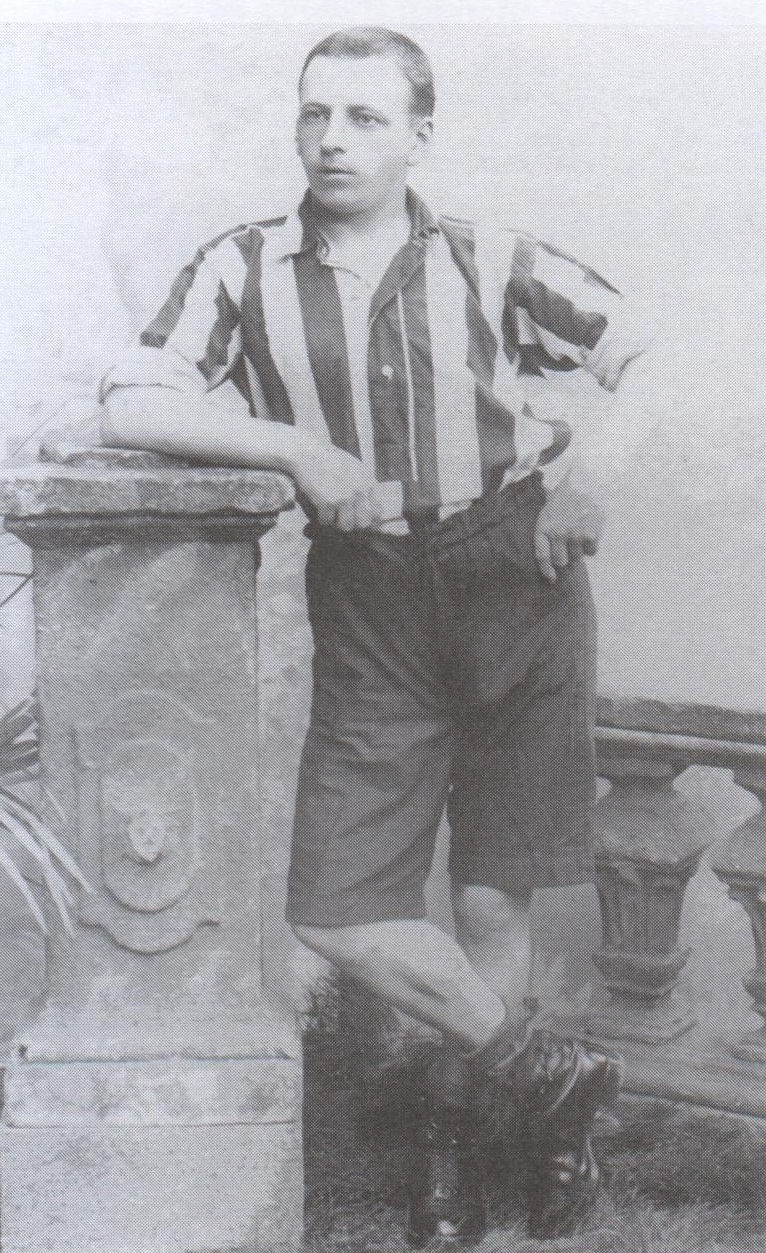

Personal information
- Full name: Walter Keay
- Date of birth: 16 January 1871
- Place of birth: Whiteinch, Glasgow, Scotland
- Date of death: 16 January 1943 (aged 72)
- Place of death: Winchester, England
- Position: Inside forward

Youth career
- Brookland
- Whitfield
- Whiteinch

Senior career*
Years	Team	Apps	(Gls)
	Partick Thistle	41	(18)
- Darlington
1893–1895	Derby County	24	(7)
1895–1900	Southampton	60	(22)
- * Club domestic league appearances and goals

Walter Keay (16 January 1871 – 16 January 1943) was a Scottish professional footballer who played as an inside forward for various clubs, including Partick Thistle in Scotland and Derby County and Southampton in England. His main claim to fame was scoring the first goal at The Dell stadium on its opening on 3 September 1898.

== Football career ==
=== Early career ===
Keay was born in Whiteinch, Scotland and played as a youth for various local sides before starting his professional career at nearby Partick Thistle. He later moved south to Darlington to seek fame and fortune before signing for Derby County in July 1893.

=== Derby County ===
He spent two seasons with the Midlands club, supplying the crosses for Steve Bloomer, John McMillan and John Goodall to score. Derby finished third in Division 1 in 1893–94, scoring 73 goals in 30 games, but in the following season they finished fifteenth and had to play off against Liverpool, who were relegated.

=== Southampton ===
In the spring of 1895, Charles Robson, the newly appointed secretary/manager of Southampton St. Mary's, and Alfred McMinn, one of the club committee, visited the Midlands in search of new players to strengthen the team ready for their second season in the Southern League. McMinn was a native of Staffordshire and was "most persuasive on his home turf". On this trip, Robson and McMinn signed six players: Keay, Joe Turner, Jack Farrell, Samuel Meston and Willie Naughton from Stoke and Alf Wood from Burslem Port Vale, as well as recruiting Stoke's long-serving trainer, Bill Dawson. The Saints committee were anxious to secure their services and signed then before the Football League season was over. Port Vale and Stoke lodged a complaint with The Football Association about "poaching", and an emergency FA meeting was held at Sheffield, resulting in the Saints being severely censured for negligence. St Mary's were ordered to pay their own costs, plus £4 6s 3d to Stoke and £1 13s to Port Vale. McMinn was suspended for a year and Dawson for a month. Wood's registration with St Mary's was cancelled (shortly afterwards he moved to Stoke).

In the next four seasons, Keay featured regularly as Southampton won the League for three consecutive seasons from 1896–97 to 1898–99. Keay was the catalyst that helped knit the forward line together and he formed a useful partnership with Joe Turner, with Keay creating the chances for Turner to convert.

In his first season with Southampton St. Mary's (who were then playing at the Antelope Ground) the club finished third in the Southern League. In the summer of 1896, the club moved to the County Cricket Ground. The Saints forward line was boosted by the signing of Bob Buchanan from Woolwich Arsenal, with the defence being strengthened by the signing of George Clawley from Tottenham Hotspur. Southampton exceeded the achievements of the two previous seasons, winning the Southern League title without losing a match, as well as reaching the Second Round Proper of the FA Cup, where they went out to Newton Heath in a replay.

The 1897–98 season followed a similar pattern, with Southampton retaining their league title, and advancing to the semi-final of the FA Cup, losing to Nottingham Forest in a controversial replay.

After two years in their temporary home at the County Ground in Northlands Road, in 1898 Southampton found a permanent home close by in Archers Road. The Dell ground was officially opened on 3 September with a match against Brighton United. Saints took an early lead, with Keay scoring the opening goal following "a little finessing" from Tom Smith, and Southampton went on to secure a 4–1 victory.

Joe Turner had moved to Stoke in the summer of 1898 and The "Saints" struggled to find an adequate replacement at outside-right, with neither Jim McKenzie nor George Seeley holding down the position for long. As a consequence, Keay's form started to decline and he was in and out of the side, with only one league appearance from January onwards.

He made one further appearance in November 1899 and retired in the 1900 close season. On his retirement in 1900, Southampton's grateful fans presented Keay with an inscribed pocket-watch.

In all he made 83 league and FA cup appearances for the "Saints", scoring 28 goals.

== After retirement ==
After retiring from professional football (aged 28) he remained in the Southampton area and became a local publican for several years. He later became a shipwright for Camper and Nicholsons at Shamrock Quay and in 1923 he also coached Southampton's reserves.

In 1923, he returned to the Dell as a reserve team coach and in the 1930s he scouted for Southampton FC.

== Honours ==
Southampton

- Southern League champions: 1896–97, 1897–98, 1898–99
