= 1901–02 Dundee F.C. season =

Dundee
1901–02 season
- Manager: William Wallace
- Stadium: Dens Park
- Division One: 9th
- Scottish Cup: 2nd round
- Top goalscorer: League: Jimmy Turnbull (4); All: David Mackay (5)
Home colours

The 1901–02 season was the ninth season in which Dundee competed at a Scottish national level, playing in Division One and finishing in 9th place. Dundee would also compete in the Scottish Cup.

== Scottish Division One ==
Statistics provided by Dee Archive

Match day	Date	Opponent	H/A	Score	Dundee scorer(s)	Attendance
1	17 August	Celtic	A	1–1	Mackay	5,000
2	24 August	Kilmarnock	H	0–0		8,000
3	31 August	Rangers	H	0–3		12,000
4	7 September	Greenock Morton	H	4–1	Atherton, Turnbull (2), McDiarmid	5,000
5	14 September	St Mirren	H	1–2	Atherton	7,000
6	21 September	Hibernian	H	1–0	Barron	5,000
7	5 October	Queen's Park	A	0–1		
8	12 October	Heart of Midlothian	A	0–4		
9	19 October	Third Lanark	H	1–1	Steven	6,000
10	26 October	St Mirren	A	0–3		
11	2 November	Greenock Morton	H	0–0		6,000
12	9 November	Kilmarnock	A	0–4		
13	16 November	Celtic	H	2–3	Cowie, Mackay	8,000
14	30 November	Hibernian	A	0–5		
15	7 December	Heart of Midlothian	H	2–0	Robertson, Mackay	7,000
16	28 December	Third Lanark	A	0–0		1,500
17	1 March	Queen's Park	H	2–0	Turnbull, Lloyd	3,000
18	29 March	Rangers	H	1–3	Turnbull	10,000

=== League table ===
Pos	Team	Pld	W	D	L	GF	GA	GD	Pts
6	Hibernian	18	6	4	8	36	24	+12	16
7	Kilmarnock	18	5	6	7	21	25	−4	16
8	Queen's Park	18	5	4	9	21	32	−11	14
9	Dundee	18	4	5	9	16	31	−15	13
10	Morton	18	1	5	12	18	40	−22	7

Source: nozdrul.plus.com

== Scottish Cup ==
Statistics provided by Dee Archive

Match day	Date	Opponent	H/A	Score	Dundee scorer(s)	Attendance
1st round	11 January	Ayr	A	0–0		3,000
1R replay	18 January	Ayr	H	2–0	Mackay (2)	
2nd round	16 February	Kilmarnock	A	0–2		6,000

== Player statistics ==
Statistics provided by Dee Archive

No.	Pos	Nat	Player	Total		First Division		Scottish Cup	
No.	Pos	Nat	Player	Apps	Goals	Apps	Goals	Apps	Goals
	FW	(England) ENG	Tommy Atherton	10	2	8	2	2	0
	FW	(Scotland) SCO	John Barron	3	1	3	1	0	0
	FW	(Scotland) SCO	Dave Cowie	1	1	1	1	0	0
	MF	(Scotland) SCO	Hugh Goldie	16	0	14	0	2	0
	MF	(Scotland) SCO	Alick Halkett	1	0	1	0	0	0
	FW	(Scotland) SCO	John Halkett	6	0	6	0	0	0
	MF	(Scotland) SCO	George Henderson	3	0	2	0	1	0
	GK	(England) ENG	Arthur Howes	20	0	17	0	3	0
	MF	(Scotland) SCO	Jimmy Jeffray	1	0	1	0	0	0
	DF	(Scotland) SCO	Willie Johnstone	12	0	12	0	0	0
	MF	(Scotland) SCO	Sandy Keillor	2	0	2	0	0	0
	FW	(England) ENG	Frank Lloyd	8	1	5	1	3	0
	MF	(Scotland) SCO	William Longair	19	0	16	0	3	0
	FW	(Scotland) SCO	Sandy MacFarlane	9	0	6	0	3	0
	FW	(Scotland) SCO	David Mackay	16	5	13	3	3	2
	FW	(Scotland) SCO	Tommy McDermott	10	0	10	0	0	0
	FW	(Scotland) SCO	Fred McDiarmid	17	1	16	1	1	0
	FW	(Scotland) SCO	Archie McGeoch	1	0	1	0	0	0
	MF	(Scotland) SCO	Peter Robertson	21	1	18	1	3	0
	DF	(Scotland) SCO	Jimmy Sharp	21	0	18	0	3	0
	FW	(Scotland) SCO	David Steven	7	1	7	1	0	0
	GK	(Scotland) SCO	Tom Stewart	1	0	1	0	0	0
	DF	(Scotland) SCO	David Storrier	10	0	7	0	3	0
	FW	(Scotland) SCO	Jimmy Turnbull	16	4	13	4	3	0

== See also ==
- List of Dundee F.C. seasons
