= Jim McKenzie (footballer) =

Scottish footballer (1875-1945)

Personal information
- Full name: James Ross McKenzie
- Date of birth: 17 August 1875
- Place of birth: Glasgow, Scotland
- Date of death: 18 May 1945 (aged 69)
- Height: 5 ft 6 in (1.68 m)
- Position: Outside left

Youth career
- Gatmore
- Possil Park
- East Stirlingshire
- Cowlairs

Senior career*
Years	Team	Apps	(Gls)
1896–1897	Burton Swifts	26	(5)
1897–1898	Clyde		
1898–1899	Southampton	6	(2)
1899–1900	Clyde		
- * Club domestic league appearances and goals

James Ross McKenzie (17 August 1875 – 18 May 1945) was a Scottish professional footballer who played as an outside-forward for various clubs in Scotland and England in the 1890s.

== Football career ==
McKenzie was born in Glasgow and trained as an upholsterer, playing amateur football for various clubs in the northern half of the city before moving to England in September 1896 to join Burton Swifts of the Football League Second Division.

At Burton he had a successful season, missing only four league matches, scoring five goals, as the Swifts finished the 1896–97 season in eleventh place. He then returned to Glasgow to spend a season with Clyde, at the end of which they finished at the foot of the table.

In the summer of 1898, he was persuaded to move to southern England to join the Southern League champions, Southampton. The "Saints" were about to embark on their first season in their new stadium and McKenzie made his debut for Southampton in the opening match at The Dell, against Brighton United on 3 September 1898.

After Watty Keay had opened the scoring, McKenzie (playing at outside-left) missed some good chances as the Saints put pressure on the Brighton goal. As half-time approached, McKenzie made a "smart run up the left" and crossed for Abe Hartley to score the second goal. McKenzie then added a third in the second half, and although Brighton pulled one back through Roddy McLeod, Tom Smith wrapped the match up with the fourth goal.

The appreciative Saints fans dubbed McKenzie "little Joe Turner", but after only six appearances the lightweight, diminutive winger lost his place to George Seeley. Following a serious leg injury in reserve team match, he returned to Scotland, rejoining Clyde once he had recovered.

== Honours ==
Southampton

- Southern League champions: 1898–99
