= Duncan McLean (footballer, born 1874) =

Scottish footballer (1874–1965)

Personal information
- Full name: Duncan McLean
- Date of birth: 30 June 1874
- Place of birth: Govan, Scotland
- Date of death: 31 January 1965 (aged 90)
- Place of death: Newport, Isle of Wight, England
- Height: 5 ft 7 in (1.70 m)
- Position: Outside forward

Youth career
- Summerton
- Moor Park
- Elderpark Rangers

Senior career*
Years	Team	Apps	(Gls)
–	Partick Thistle		
18??–1899	Cowes		
1899–1900	Southampton	8	(3)
1900–1901	Derby County	0	(0)
1903–1907	Cowes		
- * Club domestic league appearances and goals

Duncan McLean (30 June 1874 – 31 January 1965) was a Scottish professional footballer who played for various clubs around the turn of the 20th century, including Southampton in 1898–99, where he helped win the Southern League championship.

== Football career ==
McLean was born in the Govan area of Glasgow and trained as a shipyard engineer. After a spell on the books of Partick Thistle as an amateur, his work took him to Cowes on the Isle of Wight in southern England. Whilst working at Cowes, he turned out for Cowes F.C., playing in the Southern League Second Division. In early 1899, he was spotted by George Thomas, a director of Southampton F.C. and was signed by the "Saints" as a professional.

He made his debut for Southampton on 11 March 1899, when he took the place of David Steven at inside-right in a 4–1 victory over Bristol City. For the next match, at home to Chatham, McLean moved to outside-left, replacing George Seeley and scored in another 4–1 victory. Described as "extremely versatile", McLean retained his place in the side for the rest of the season. In his eight appearances, he played in four positions, including once at right-half and the final three at centre-forward, playing alongside fellow-Scot Roddy McLeod.

McLean's three goals included the third at Bristol City in the final match of the season; with both sides level on points at the top of the table, Saints had a superior goal average and only needed a draw to take the title for the third consecutive year. After being 2–0 down at half-time, the Saints had drawn level through goals from Arthur Chadwick and Harry Wood. McLean's goal came following a move involving John Robertson and Wood, giving the Saints the lead for the first time in the match. Wood soon added another and, although City pulled one back, Southampton finished as 4–3 victors, and the title was theirs.

In the summer of 1899, Southampton recruited several new players including England international Alf Milward and McLean spent the 1899–1900 season in the reserves.

In May 1900, McLean was transferred to Derby County of the Football League First Division, but was unable to break into the first-team and after a year he move back to Glasgow and resumed work in the shipyards. In 1902, he returned to the Isle of Wight, assisting the Cowes team and in 1906 was part of their side that won the Hampshire Senior Cup.

== Honours ==
Southampton

- Southern League champions: 1898–99

Cowes

- Hampshire Senior Cup winners: 1906
