= Arthur Howes (footballer) =

English footballer (1876–1950)

Personal information
- Full name: Arthur Howes
- Date of birth: 9 October 1876
- Place of birth: Leicester, England
- Date of death: 1950 (aged 73–74)
- Height: 5 ft 11 in (1.80 m)
- Position: Goalkeeper

Senior career*
Years	Team	Apps	(Gls)
189?–1896	Leicester Waverley		
1896–1897	Leicester Fosse	12	(0)
1897–1898	Reading		
1898	Lincoln City	0	(0)
1898–1899	Leicester Fosse	3	(0)
1899–1900	Brighton United		
1900–1902	Dundee	17	(0)
1902–1904	Brighton & Hove Albion	35	(0)
1904–1907	Queens Park Rangers	49	(0)
- * Club domestic league appearances and goals

Arthur Howes (9 October 1876 – 1950) was an English professional footballer who played as a goalkeeper in the Football League for Leicester Fosse and in the Scottish League for Dundee. He also played Southern League football for Reading, Brighton United, Brighton & Hove Albion and Queens Park Rangers.

== Life and career ==
Arthur Howes was born on 9 October 1876 in Leicester, where he played football for the Waverley club before signing for Leicester Fosse of the Football League Second Division in September 1896. He played 12 league matches before moving on to Reading of the Southern League, and after a trial with Football League club Lincoln City, rejoined Leicester Fosse for another three appearances. He returned to the Southern League in 1899 with Brighton United, under the management of former Leicester Fosse trainer John Jackson. Although Tommy Spicer was first-choice goalkeeper, Howes made 11 appearances in all competitions before the club folded in March 1900.

He then went to Scotland where he signed for Dundee as cover for Tom Stewart. In his first season, he kept goal for Dundee 'A', helping them win the 1900–01 Northern League title. Dundee 'A' finished level on points with Orion and the title was decided in a play-off; Dundee 'A' won 3–0, although Stewart was brought in to keep goal in place of Howes. In his second, he made his first-team debut on the opening day of the 1901–02 Division One season, in a 1–1 draw away against Celtic, and missed only one match thereafter. He was reported to have suffered with nerves while with Dundee, and a 1921 retrospective of a match in which he played described him as having "had his very bad days and his really brilliant outings."

Howes returned to England and spent two seasons with Brighton & Hove Albion. In the first, he shared goalkeeping duties with Squire Whitehurst as Albion gained promotion to the Southern League First Division, but Howes' experience was preferred at the higher level, and he missed only one match in 1903–04. Despite having gained a reputation as "one of the best custodians in the South", he was released at the end of that season, and in November 1904 joined another Southern League club, Queens Park Rangers. He and Harry Collins shared the goalkeeper position for the rest of the 1904–05 season, and after Collins left for Everton, Howes shared the role with former England international Matt Kingsley. He was undisputed first choice in the 1906–07 campaign until Rangers signed Ike Webb from Sunderland in March 1907. Webb played out the season, and Howes retired from professional football in the 1907 close season because of injury.

Howes died in 1950.

== Career statistics ==
Appearances and goals by club, season and competition
Club	Season	League			National Cup (Note: Includes FA Cup, Scottish Cup)		Other		Total	
Club	Season	Division	Apps	Goals	Apps	Goals	Apps	Goals	Apps	Goals
Leicester Fosse	1896–97	Second Division	10	0	0	0	—		10	0
Leicester Fosse	1897–98	Second Division	2	0	0	0	—		2	0
Leicester Fosse	Total		12	0	0	0	—		12	0
Reading	1897–98	Southern League Division One								
Leicester Fosse	1898–99	Second Division	4	0	0	0	—		4	0
Brighton United	1911–12	Southern League Division One							11	0
Dundee	1900–01	Scottish Division One	0	0	0	0			0	0
Dundee	1897–98	Scottish Division One	17	0	3	0			20	0
Dundee	Total		17	0	3	0			20	0
Brighton & Hove Albion	1902–03	Southern League Division Two	2	0	3	0	10 (Note: Appearances in South-Eastern League)	0	15	0
Brighton & Hove Albion	1903–04	Southern League Division One	33	0	1	0	—		34	0
Brighton & Hove Albion	Total		35	0	4	0	10	0	49	0
Queens Park Rangers	1904–05	Southern League Division One	11	0	1	0	8 (Note: Six appearances in Western League Division One, two in Southern Professional Charity Cup)	0	20	0
Queens Park Rangers	1905–06	Southern League Division One	12	0	1	0	10 (Note: Appearances in Western League Division One)	0	23	0
Queens Park Rangers	1906–07	Southern League Division One	26	0	2	0	10 (Note: Eight appearances in Western League Division One, two in Southern Professional Charity Cup)	0	38	0
Queens Park Rangers	Total		49	0	4	0	28	0	81	0
Career total			117	0	11	0	38	0	177	0

== Sources ==
- Carder, Tim; Harris, Roger (1997). Albion A–Z: A Who's Who of Brighton & Hove Albion F.C. Hove: Goldstone Books. ISBN 978-0-9521337-1-1.
