= Walter Fairgrieve =

Scottish footballer (1874–1915)

Personal information
- Full name: Walter Robert Fairgrieve
- Date of birth: 30 August 1874
- Place of birth: Edinburgh, Scotland
- Date of death: 2 June 1915 (aged 40)
- Place of death: Troon, Scotland
- Position: Outside right

Youth career
- Dalry Primrose

Senior career*
Years	Team	Apps	(Gls)
- Glasgow Perthshire
1898–1899	Southampton	1	(0)
1899–1900	Luton Town	15	(5)
1900	Hibernian	0	(0)
1900	Partick Thistle	5	(1)
1900	Heart of Midlothian	2	(1)
- Dunfermline Athletic
- * Club domestic league appearances and goals

Walter Robert Fairgrieve (30 August 1874 – 2 June 1915) was a Scottish professional footballer who played as an outside forward for Southampton and Luton Town in the late 1890s.

== Football career ==
Fairgrieve was born in Edinburgh and started his football career with Dalry Primrose and Glasgow Perthshire, during which time he earned Scottish junior international honours and represented Glasgow in a game against Lanarkshire.

After a spell with Liverpool and a month's trial period at Everton, he joined Southern League champions Southampton in May 1898 on a professional contract. With a reputation for heavy drinking and general misconduct, he failed to secure a regular first-team place and spent most of his time at The Dell in the reserves, with his only first team outing coming when he took the place of Tom Smith for the second match of the 1898–99 season, a 2–0 defeat by New Brompton.

In the summer of 1899, he left "the Saints" to join Luton Town of the Football League Second Division, but after six months, he returned to Scotland in January 1900.

He finished his career with a brief spell in the Scottish League with Hibernian, Partick Thistle, Heart of Midlothian and Dunfermline Athletic.

== Personal life ==
Fairgrieve enlisted as a private in the 15th Battalion, Royal Scots of the British Army early in the First World War but did not see any active service. He died in Troon on 2 June 1915 following an attack of angina. He is buried in North Merchiston Cemetery in Edinburgh.
