= Charles Robson (cricketer) =

English cricketer (1859–1943)

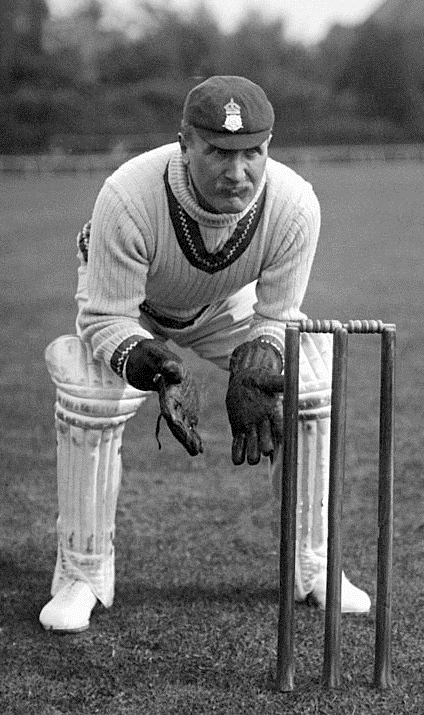
- Robson photographed in about 1905

Personal information
- Full name: Charles Robson
- Born: 20 June 1859; Kilburn, Middlesex, England
- Died: 27 September 1943 (aged 84); Abingdon, Berkshire, England
- Batting: Right-handed
- Bowling: Right-arm slow
- Role: Wicket-keeper

Domestic team information
- Years: Team
- 1881–1883: Middlesex
- 1883: Marylebone Cricket Club
- 1889–1906: Hampshire
- 1903–1904: London County

Career statistics
Competition	First-class
Matches	160
Runs scored	3,840
Batting average	15.23
100s/50s	1/10
Top score	101
Balls bowled	228
Wickets	2
Bowling average	82.50
5 wickets in innings	–
10 wickets in match	–
Best bowling	1/2
Catches/stumpings	201/45
- Source: Cricinfo, 10 April 2023

Charles Robson (20 June 1859 – 27 September 1943) was an English cricketer, who played first-class cricket as a wicket-keeper for Middlesex between 1881 and 1883, and for Hampshire from 1891 to 1906, for whom he served as captain for three years from 1900 to 1902. He was later associated with W. G. Grace's London County team. He was also secretary to Southampton St Mary's Football Club for one season, from 1895 to 1896, and was one of the founding directors of the company which was established in 1897 when the club changed its name to Southampton Football Club.

== Cricket career ==
=== Middlesex ===
Robson was born at Kilburn (then in Middlesex) in June 1859. He was educated firstly at Bruce Castle School, before attending Chatham House Grammar School; he was a member of the cricket eleven at both schools. Robson made his debut in first-class cricket for Middlesex against Surrey at Lord's in 1881, with him making twelve appearances in first-class cricket Middlesex to 1883. In these, he scored 246 runs at an average of 12.94, though at this early stage in his first-class career he did not keep wicket, with A. J. Webbe being Middlesex's long-established wicket-keeper. While playing for Middlesex in 1883, Robson also appeared in a first-class match for the Marylebone Cricket Club (MCC) against Sussex.

=== Hampshire ===
Robson later moved to Southampton, where he began his playing association with Hampshire in 1889, at which point Hampshire were a second-class county. He soon became Hampshire's wicket-keeper, and often the opened the batting in partnership with Russell Bencraft. Hampshire regained their first-class status in October 1894, allowing them to join the County Championship for 1895. He made his debut for Hampshire in first-class matches in their return debut County Championship match against Somerset at Taunton. He made fourteen appearances in the 1895 season, and followed that up in 1896 with a further fourteen appearances, in which he recorded two half centuries, and made thirty appearances for Hampshire over the proceeding two seasons. He was a member of Ranjitsinhji's team which toured North America in 1899, in which Robson made two first-class appearances against the Gentlemen of Philadelphia.

In December 1899, he was elected to succeed Teddy Wynyard as captain for the 1900 season, captaining a particularly weak Hampshire side that had lost many of its players to military service in the Second Boer War. He scored his only first-class century in 1900, making 101 against Warwickshire at Edgbaston. In his first season as captain, Hampshire finished bottom of the County Championship; Robson contributed 545 runs across the season, averaging 16.02 with the bat. He guided Hampshire to seventh in the County Championship during his second season as captain, their best finish since their admission to the County Championship. Robson played a notable innings during that season against Lancashire at Liverpool. Having been bowled out in the first innings for only 106, Lancashire replied with 413–8 declared, and when Hampshire opened their second innings, it looked unlikely that Lancashire would need to bat again. J. G. Greig opened the batting and the Hampshire score had reached 374 for 9, with Robson, who was batting at number eleven, putting on 113 for the tenth wicket, with Robson contributing 52 runs alongside Grieg's unbeaten 249 not out; their endeavours ensured Lancashire had to chase 181 in 140 minutes, but rain intervened with Lancashire having reached 111 for 5.

In August 1901, Robson was extended an invitation to tour Australia with Archie MacLaren's touring party, which he accepted and acted as deputy to Dick Lilley. Although he did not play in any of the five Test matches on the tour, he did feature in one first-class match against Victoria at the Melbourne Cricket Ground. For the 1902 season, Robson passed the Hampshire captaincy to Edward Sprot, and relinquished his wicket-keeping duties to Jimmy Stone in the same season. He decided to step back from playing in 1903, in order to allow younger players an opportunity in the Hampshire team, but did return to play for Hampshire in the 1906 County Championship, making three appearances. Described by Wisden as a hard hitting batsman who showed "skill in defence", he made 129 first-class appearances for Hampshire, in which he scored 3,299 runs at an average of 15.27; behind the stumps, he took 165 catches and made 37 stumpings.

During the 1903 season, with Hampshire having no games until June, Robson began his association with W. G. Grace's London County when he played against the MCC at Lord's; he played three first-class matches for London County in 1903, in addition to playing for the Gentlemen in the Gentlemen v Players fixture at The Oval, in addition to playing for the Gentlemen of the South against the Players of the South during the Bournemouth Cricket Week. His association with London County continued after the stepped back from playing for Hampshire, with him making a further three appearances for the team in 1904. He continued to play for the Gentlemen of the South until 1905, in addition to playing for the Gentlemen of England twice, most notably against the touring Australians in 1905. Robson also played in the North v South fixture in the same year.

== Southampton St Mary's Football Club ==
In the spring of 1895, Robson was appointed manager-secretary to Southampton St Mary's Football Club, then playing in the Southern League. As secretary, he was responsible for signing new players and agreeing player contracts as well as being involved in team selection – the day-to-day coaching and training of the players was in the hands of the trainer. During his tenure as manager-secretary, Robson won 69.57% of his matches, making him the second most successful manager by matches won in Southampton's history.

One of Robson's first acts as secretary was to accompany Alfred McMinn, one of the club committee members, on a trip to The Potteries to recruit players. McMinn was a native of Staffordshire and was "most persuasive on his home turf". On this trip, Robson and McMinn signed six players: Jack Farrell, Samuel Meston and Willie Naughton from Stoke, Watty Keay from Derby County, Joe Turner from Dresden United and Alf Wood from Burslem Port Vale, as well as recruiting Stoke's long-serving trainer, Bill Dawson. The Southampton committee were anxious to secure their services and signed them before The Football League season was over. Port Vale and Stoke lodged a complaint with The Football Association (FA) about "poaching", and an emergency FA meeting was held at Sheffield, resulting in Southampton being severely censured for negligence. St Mary's were ordered to pay their own costs, plus £4 6s 3d to Stoke and £1 13s to Port Vale. McMinn was suspended for a year and Dawson for a month. Wood's registration with St Mary's was cancelled, and shortly afterwards he moved to Stoke.

At the end of the 1895–96 season, Southampton had to vacate their Antelope Ground home, which had been sold for re-development, and moved to the County Ground at Newlands Road, partly through the connections of the club's president, Robson's former Hampshire opening partner, Russell Bencraft, who was also Honorary Secretary to Hampshire. During the summer of 1896, Robson resigned his position as secretary, in order concentrate on cricket following Hampshire's return to first-class cricket, being replaced by Alfred McMinn (having served his twelve months' suspension), with Er Arnfield as his assistant.

Robson was one of the founder directors when the football club was incorporated into a limited company, "Southampton Football and Athletic Company Limited" in July 1897; on the Memorandum of Association he was listed as "Charles Robson, Mineral Water Merchant and Hampshire wicket-keeper" of Hill Lane, Southampton. He remained a director of the company for several years.

== Personal life ==
In Southampton, Robson entered into business as a mineral water manufacturer in the later 1880s. He was summoned to court in August 1892, for allegedly breaching the Factory Act. He had a son, Russell, who was injured during the First World War while serving with the Royal Flying Corps. Robson died at his residence in Abingdon in September 1943.

== Bibliography ==
- Sweetman, Simon (2012). H. V. Hesketh-Prichard: Amazing Stories. Cardiff: ACS. ISBN 9781908165213.
- Chalk, Gary; Holley, Duncan (1987). Saints – A complete record. Derby: Breedon Books. ISBN 0907969224.
- Juson, Dave; Bull, David (2001). Full-Time at The Dell. Bristol: Hagiology Publishing. ISBN 0953447421.

Sporting positions
Preceded by Teddy Wynyard	Hampshire cricket captain 1900–1902	Succeeded by Edward Sprot
