= David Steven =

Scottish footballer

Personal information
- Full name: David Steven
- Date of birth: 16 March 1878
- Place of birth: Dundee, Scotland
- Date of death: 28 April 1903 (aged 25)
- Place of death: Dundee, Scotland
- Height: 5 ft 6 in (1.68 m)
- Position: Inside forward

Youth career
- Dundee Violet

Senior career*
| Years | Team | Apps | (Gls) |
| –1896 | Dundee | | |
| 1896–1897 | Bury | 3 | (0) |
| 1897 | Dundee | | |
| 1897–1899 | Southampton | 17 | (6) |
| 1899–1903 | Dundee | 42 | (13) |
- * Club domestic league appearances and goals

David Steven (16 March 1878 – 28 April 1903) was a Scottish professional footballer who played as an inside-forward around the turn of the 20th century, spending most of his career with his hometown club, Dundee, before he died from a heart attack aged only 25.

== Football career ==
Steven was born in Dundee and after an early career with junior club, Dundee Violet, he joined Dundee as a teenager. He was spotted by Bury, of the English Football League First Division, and moved to Lancashire in August 1896, aged 18.

In his short time with the "Shakers" he made only three first-team appearances, in the outside-left berth, but was unable to displace Jack Plant, who later went on to represent England. Steven fell out with Bury, who refused to release his Football League registration, and returned to Scotland. After briefly re-joining Dundee, he came back to England in the 1897 close season, signing for the Southern League champions, Southampton, who were not members of the Football League and were thus not affected by Bury's refusal to release his registration papers.

At the "Saints", his "fearless, dashing forward play" made him popular with the fans. He made his debut in a 2–1 victory over Reading on 19 February 1898 replacing Robert Buchanan at inside-right, with Buchanan moving to centre-forward in place of the injured Jack Farrell. Steven retained his place for the rest of the season, scoring four goals, including two in a 5–1 victory over Gravesend United at the County Ground on 4 April. The Saints finished the 1897–98 season as champions, and moved to their new home at The Dell in the summer.

In the 1898–99 season, Steven was in-and-out of the side, generally replacing England international Harry Wood at inside-right, with Wood switching to inside-left to replace Watty Keay. Steven made nine appearances, scoring twice, as the Saints took the league title for the third consecutive year.

In the summer of 1899, Steven returned to Dundee to gain more regular first-team football.

In April 1903, he suffered a fatal heart attack and died aged only 25.

== Honours ==
Southampton

- Southern League champions: 1897–98 and 1898–99
