= Bob Brown (footballer, born 1869) =

English footballer (1869–c.1901)

Personal information
- Full name: Robert Brown
- Date of birth: 1869
- Place of birth: Liverpool, England
- Position: Outside forward

Senior career*
Years	Team	Apps	(Gls)
1894–1897	Burton Wanderers	84	(19)
1897–1898	Southampton	12	(2)
1898–1899	Bristol Rovers	24	(3)
1899–1900	Queens Park Rangers		
1900–1901	Swindon Town	22	(1)
- * Club domestic league appearances and goals

Robert Brown (1869 – after 1901) was an English professional footballer who played as an outside-forward for various clubs at the end of the 19th century, including three years in the Football League with Burton Wanderers and a year at Southampton in 1897–98, where he helped win the Southern League championship.

== Football career ==
Brown was born in Liverpool and his professional football career started when he joined Burton Wanderers in July 1894 for their first season in the Football League Second Division. Over the next three season, Brown rarely missed a match, making a total of 87 league and FA Cup appearances. At the end of the 1896–97 season, after finishing second last in the League, they were voted out.

In May 1897, Brown was given a trial by Southern League champions Southampton and travelled to Hampshire with Arthur Chadwick of Burton Swifts. Despite being described in the local press as "an average type player", Brown was signed on a professional contract and made his debut at inside-right in a 2–0 defeat at Tottenham on the opening day of the season, 18 September 1897. Brown retained his place for the next match before giving way to Willie Naughton.

Brown returned in January 1898, now playing at outside-right, ousting Jimmy Yates from the side and went on to make a total of twelve league appearances, scoring twice (in consecutive matches in April). Brown also made one FA Cup appearance, when he replaced the injured Joe Farrell in the semi-final replay against Nottingham Forest, when the "Saints" were rather controversially eliminated when goalkeeper George Clawley had his eyes "choked with snow" in a blizzard and conceded two goals in the final minutes of the game.

In the 1898 close-season, Southampton signed Tom Smith and Brown was released. He then had seasons at Bristol Rovers, where he was known by the nickname 'Daddy' Brown, and Queens Park Rangers, before winding up his career at Swindon Town.

== Honours ==
Southampton

- Southern League champions: 1897–98
