= Alfred McMinn =

English football manager

Alfred McMinn, was an English manager for Southampton F.C. from August 1896 to May 1897.

In the spring of 1895, McMinn (then a club committee member) accompanied Charles Robson on a trip to the Potteries to recruit players. McMinn was a native of Staffordshire and was "most persuasive on his home turf". On this trip, Robson and McMinn signed six players: Jack Farrell, Samuel Meston and Willie Naughton from Stoke, Watty Keay from Derby County, Joe Turner from Dresden United and Alf Wood from Burslem Port Vale, as well as recruiting Stoke's long-serving trainer, Bill Dawson. The Saints committee were anxious to secure their services and signed them before the English Football League season was over. Port Vale and Stoke lodged a complaint with the Football Association about "poaching", and an emergency FA meeting was held at Sheffield, resulting in the Saints being severely censured for negligence. St Mary's were ordered to pay their own costs, plus £4 6s 3d to Stoke and £1 13s to Port Vale. McMinn was suspended for a year and Dawson for a month. Wood's registration with St Mary's was cancelled (shortly afterwards he moved to Stoke).

During the summer of 1896, Robson resigned his position as secretary in order to concentrate on his cricket career, being replaced by McMinn (having served his twelve months' suspension), with Er Arnfield as his assistant. McMinn led the side to their best season since their foundation, winning the Southern League title at the third attempt and into the Second Round of the FA Cup.

After one season in charge of the Saints, McMinn stepped down from day-to-day involvement with the team, with Arnfield replacing him. In July 1897, McMinn became the Hon. Secretary of the newly formed Southampton Football & Athletic Company Limited. He remained on the board of the limited company until he resigned in the summer of 1900.

== Honours ==
Southampton

- Southern League champions: 1896–97

== Bibliography ==
- Chalk, Gary; Holley, Duncan (1987). Saints – A complete record. Breedon Books. ISBN 0-907969-22-4.
- Juson, Dave; Bull, David (2001). Full-Time at The Dell. Hagiology Publishing. ISBN 0-9534474-2-1.
