= 1900–01 Dundee F.C. season =

Dundee
1900–01 season
- Manager: William Wallace
- Stadium: Dens Park
- Division One: 7th
- Scottish Cup: Quarter-finals
- Top goalscorer: League: David Steven (9); All: David Steven (9)
Home colours

The 1900–01 season was the eighth season in which Dundee competed at a Scottish national level, playing in Division One and finishing in 7th place. Dundee would also compete in the Scottish Cup.

== Scottish Division One ==
Statistics provided by Dee Archive

Match day	Date	Opponent	H/A	Score	Dundee scorer(s)	Attendance
1	25 August	Kilmarnock	A	0–2		
2	1 September	Queen's Park	H	4–0	Mackay (2), Russell (o.g.), Steven	12,000
3	8 September	Heart of Midlothian	A	4–0	McGeoch, Steven (2), Mackay	6,500
4	15 September	Kilmarnock	H	3–0	Steven (2), McDermott	10,000
5	29 September	Heart of Midlothian	H	1–2	Sharp	9,000
6	6 October	Third Lanark	A	1–2	Steven	2,000
7	13 October	Greenock Morton	H	5–2	McGeoch (2), W. Robertson (2), Steven	8,000
8	20 October	Rangers	A	2–4	McDiarmid, MacDonald	4,000
9	27 October	Hibernian	A	1–2	McDiarmid	4,900
10	3 November	St Mirren	H	1–1	McDiarmid	5,000
11	10 November	Celtic	H	1–1	W. Robertson	14,000
12	17 November	Partick Thistle	A	1–1	McDermott	4,000
13	24 November	Third Lanark	H	0–0		7,000
14	1 December	Hibernian	H	1–3	Boyd	5,000
15	15 December	Rangers	H	1–5	Mackay	10,000
16	22 December	Celtic	A	2–1	Steven, J. Robertson	3,000
17	29 December	Partick Thistle	H	4–0	Boyd, Mackay, J. Robertson, McDermott	6,000
18	5 January	Queen's Park	A	0–1		5,000
19	19 January	Greenock Morton	A	1–5	Steven	4,000
20	30 February	St Mirren	A	3–3	McDermott, Mackay, J. Robertson	

=== League table ===
Pos	Team	Pld	W	D	L	GF	GA	GD	Pts
5	Kilmarnock	20	7	4	9	35	47	−12	18
5	Third Lanark	20	6	6	8	20	29	−9	18
7	Dundee	20	6	5	9	36	35	+1	17
7	Queen's Park	20	7	3	10	33	37	−4	17
9	St Mirren	20	5	6	9	33	43	−10	16

Source: "1900-1901 Division 1 - SPFL Archive". SPFL.
Rules for classification: Teams finish equal if level on points. Points system: 2 points for a win, 1 point for a draw, 0 points for a loss

== Scottish Cup ==
Statistics provided by Dee Archive

Match day	Date	Opponent	H/A	Score	Dundee scorer(s)	Attendance
1st round	12 January	Arthurlie	H	3–1	McDermott, Longair, MacDonald	5,000
2nd round	9 February	Clyde	A	5–3	McDiarmid (2), W. Robertson, Mackay (2)	6,000
Quarter-finals	16 February	Celtic	H	0–1		17,000

== Player statistics ==
Statistics provided by Dee Archive

No.	Pos	Nat	Player	Total		First Division		Scottish Cup	
No.	Pos	Nat	Player	Apps	Goals	Apps	Goals	Apps	Goals
	MF	(Scotland) SCO	William Baird	19	0	18	0	1	0
	FW	(Scotland) SCO	Bob Boyd	6	2	5	2	1	0
	MF	(Scotland) SCO	Hugh Goldie	17	0	15	0	2	0
	DF	(Scotland) SCO	Willie Johnstone	10	0	7	0	3	0
	MF	(Scotland) SCO	Sandy Keillor	23	0	20	0	3	0
	MF	(Scotland) SCO	William Longair	22	1	19	0	3	1
	FW	(Scotland) SCO	Billy MacDonald	9	2	6	1	3	1
	FW	(Scotland) SCO	David Mackay	12	8	9	6	3	2
	FW	(Scotland) SCO	Tommy McDermott	21	5	18	4	3	1
	FW	(Scotland) SCO	Fred McDiarmid	21	5	18	3	3	2
	FW	(Scotland) SCO	Archie McGeoch	14	3	14	3	0	0
	FW	(Scotland) SCO	James Cairns Robertson	4	3	4	3	0	0
	FW	(Scotland) SCO	William Robertson	10	4	8	3	2	1
	DF	(Scotland) SCO	Jimmy Sharp	22	1	19	1	3	0
	FW	(Scotland) SCO	David Steven	17	9	17	9	0	0
	GK	(Scotland) SCO	Tom Stewart	23	0	20	0	3	0
	MF	(Scotland) SCO	Eddie Tarbart	1	0	1	0	0	0
	DF	(Scotland) SCO	Archie Taylor	2	0	2	0	0	0

== See also ==
- List of Dundee F.C. seasons
