= Edward Sprot =

Scottish cricketer

Personal information
- Full name: Edward Mark Sprot
- Born: 4 February 1872; Edinburgh, Midlothian, Scotland
- Died: 8 October 1945 (aged 73); Lower Bourne, Surrey, England
- Batting: Right-handed
- Bowling: Right-arm medium

Domestic team information
- Years: Team
- 1898–1914: Hampshire

Career statistics
Competition	First-class
Matches	270
Runs scored	12,328
Batting average	28.66
100s/50s	13/70
Top score	147
Balls bowled	3,060
Wickets	55
Bowling average	33.90
5 wickets in innings	1
10 wickets in match	–
Best bowling	5/28
Catches/stumpings	228/–
- Source: Cricinfo, 25 August 2009

Edward Mark Sprot (4 February 1872 – 8 October 1945) was a Scottish first-class cricketer and British Army officer. Following a seven year commission with the King's Shropshire Light Infantry, Sprot played first-class cricket for Hampshire from 1898 to 1914, captaining the county from 1903 to 1914. As a captain, Sprot was known for his dynamic and unusual tactics, which sought to gain positive results from matches. In all, Sprot made 270 appearances in first-class cricket, scoring over 12,000 runs and making thirteen centuries. He additionally took 55 wickets, alongside taking 228 catches in the field. His first-class career came to an end with the beginning of the First World War.

== Early life and military career ==
The son of Edward William Sprot, he was born at Edinburgh in February 1872. He was educated in England at Harrow School, where he played for the school cricket team. From there he attended the Royal Military College, Sandhurst and graduated into the King's Shropshire Light Infantry as a second lieutenant in November 1892. He was promoted to lieutenant in March 1896, before resigning his commission in July 1899. Prior to his resignation, he had represented the Shropshire Light Infantry in rackets alongside Colonel James Spens, with the pair winning The Army Rackets Challenge Cup in 1899.

== Cricket career and later life ==
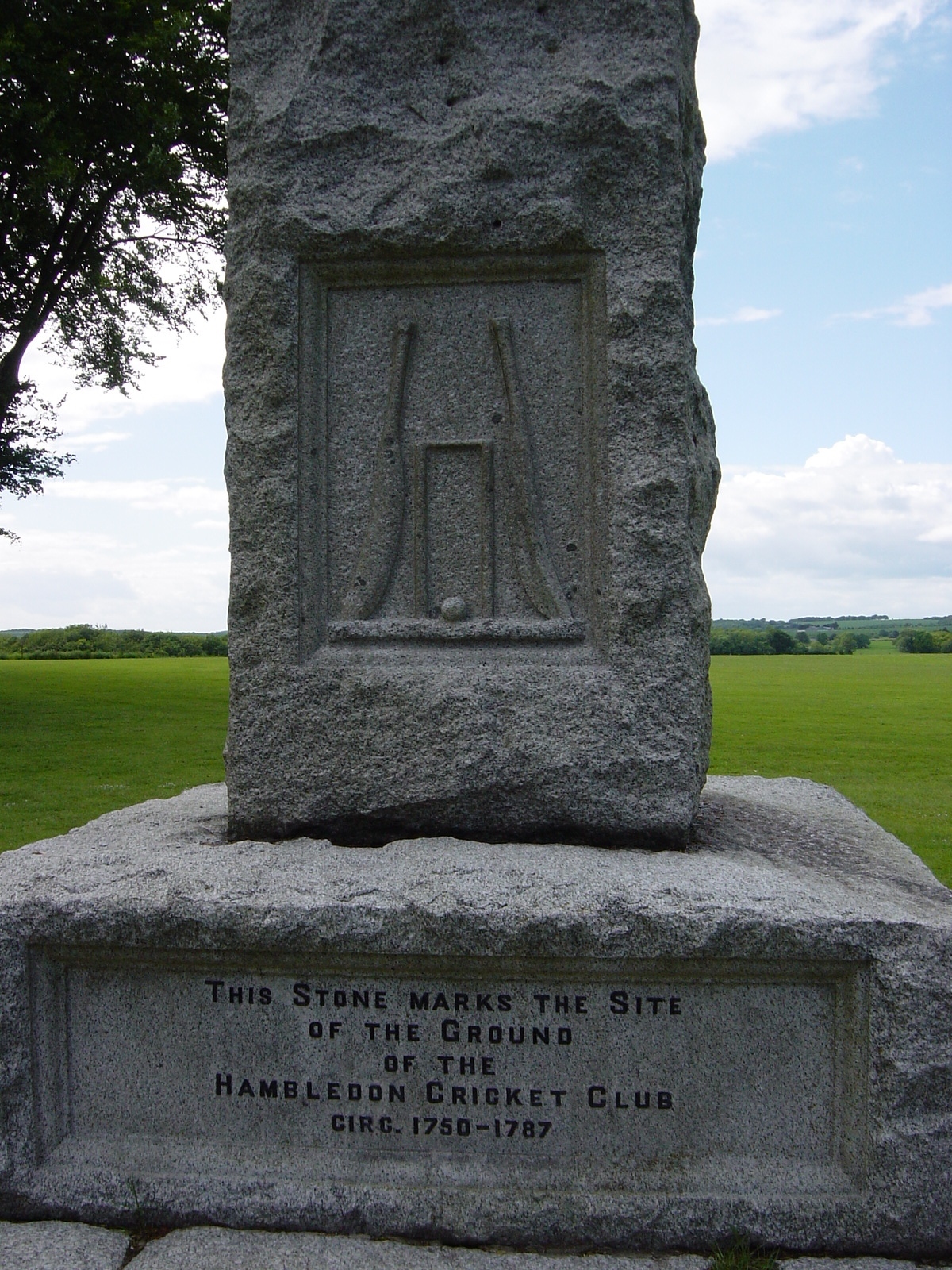
The monument to the Glory of Cricket and the Hambledon Club, unveiled by Sprot at Broadhalfpenny Down on 10 September 1908

After a series of impressive performances in army cricket, Sprot played a single first-class cricket match for Hampshire in 1898 against Cambridge University at Fenner's, before making five appearances the following season in the 1899 County Championship. Following his resignation from the army, he appeared regularly in the County Championship for the weak Hampshire side of 1900; it was during this season that he scored his maiden first-class century, a score of 103 not out against Warwickshire. Following the 1902 season, Sprot was chosen to captain Hampshire for the 1903 season, replacing Charles Robson. He captained Hampshire until 1914, with his captaincy characterised by his encouragement to play attractive cricket with enterprise and enthusiasm, guiding what was a weak Hampshire side when he gained the captaincy from the bottom of the County Championship to fifth place in 1914, and captaining Hampshire to their first victory over the touring Australians. Wisden described his captaincy as dynamic and exactly what Sir Stanley Jackson's Committee into first-class cricket had been looking for. An example of his positive captaincy came in a rain affected County Championship match against Northamptonshire in 1908; in an era in which declarations were rare, Sprot declared Hampshire's first innings before lunch on the final day of the match, still 24 runs behind Northamptonshire's first innings total. In their second innings, Northamptonshire were dismissed for 60 with Phil Mead taking 7 for 18, setting Hampshire a target of 85 for victory, which they chased successfully with Sprot scoring an unbeaten 62. Following the 1914 season, Sprot was due to be replaced as captain by Arthur Jaques for the aborted 1915 season, however Jaques was subsequently killed during the First World War.

During his career at Hampshire, he played 267 first-class matches for the county. Described by Wisden as a "fine free hitter with zest for the forcing game", Sprot was a powerful batsman whose free style of play enabled quick run scoring when he was at the crease. He scored 12,212 runs for Hampshire at an average of 28.80; he made thirteen centuries and 69 half centuries, with a highest score of 147. His best season for Hampshire came in 1905, when he scored 1,206 runs at an average of 41.58. This was one of four occasions in which he passed 1,000 runs for the season. Sprot was considered a fine fielder, taking 230 catches in first-class cricket. As a right-arm medium pace bowler, he took 54 wickets for Hampshire at a bowling average of 34.37; his sole five wicket haul of 5 for 28 came against Sussex at Portsmouth in 1900. In addition to playing first-class cricket for Hampshire, he also made three first-class appearances for other teams, making an appearance each for the South against the touring Australians in 1902, and for the Gentlemen of the South against the Players of the South in 1903, in which he scored a half century. In 1908, he played for a Hambledon XII in a commemorative first-class match against an England XI at Broadhalfpenny Down. During the opening day of the match, Sprot unveiled a granite memorial commemorating the Hambledon Club's contribution to cricket.

During the First World War, he volunteered as a special constable. Following the end of the war, Sprot, then aged 46, informed the club he would not be returning to play for them, with Lionel Tennyson subsequently inheriting the captaincy. In retirement, Sprot played billiards, golf and sport, in addition to taking up fishing, painting and playing the piano. He was described by Harry Altham as "about the best dry-fly fisherman in Hampshire". During the 1920s, he provided contributions to C. B. Fry's Mercury Magazine prize fund, which raised funds for the shore-based naval training establishment TS Mercury on the River Hamble. Sprot died at his home at Lower Bourne in Surrey in October 1945, aged 73. His younger brother, James, was killed in action during the First World War.

Sporting positions
Preceded by Charles Robson	Hampshire cricket captain 1903–1914	Succeeded by Lionel Tennyson
