= Billy Lyon (footballer) =

Scottish footballer

Personal information
- Full name: William John Lyon
- Date of birth: 8 June 1878
- Place of birth: Inverness, Scotland
- Date of death: 1915 (aged 36–37)
- Position: Wing half

Senior career*
Years	Team	Apps	(Gls)
1895–1897	Third Lanark		
1897	Clachnacuddin		
1897	Kirkintilloch Rob Roy		
1898	Dundee	7	(0)
1898	Clachnacuddin		
1898–1899	Sunderland	0	(0)
1899–1900	Walsall	32	(1)
1900	Clachnacuddin		
1900–1901	Walsall	12	(0)
1901–1903	Bristol Rovers		
1903–1904	Manchester City	6	(0)
1904–1911	Preston North End	210	(8)
1911–1912	Hyde		
1913	Lancaster Town		
Total		267	(9)
- * Club domestic league appearances and goals

William John Lyon (8 June 1878 – 1915) was a Scottish footballer who played in the Scottish Football League for Dundee, and in the Football League for Manchester City, Preston North End and Walsall.
