= George Seeley (footballer) =

English footballer (1877–1921)

Personal information
- Full name: George Ascott Seeley
- Date of birth: January qtr. 1879
- Place of birth: Torquay, England
- Date of death: 15 October 1921 (aged 42)
- Place of death: Ventnor, England
- Position: Outside forward

Youth career
- Gordon Avenue, Southampton

Senior career*
Years	Team	Apps	(Gls)
1896–1897	Southampton	1	(0)
1897	Bristol St George		
1897–1898	Eastville Rovers		
1898–1899	Southampton	8	(1)
1899–1901	New Brompton		
1901–1902	Queens Park Rangers	19	(2)
1902–1903	Southampton Wanderers		
1903–1905	Clapton Orient		
1905–1906	Leyton		
- * Club domestic league appearances and goals

George Ascott Seeley (1879 – 15 October 1921) was an English professional footballer who played for various clubs around the turn of the 20th century, including Southampton in 1898–99, where he helped win the Southern League championship.

== Football career ==
Seeley was born in Torquay in Devon, but by 1896 was living in Southampton, where he was spotted playing for a minor local club and recruited to Southampton of the Southern League. He was nicknamed "The Lion Tamer" due to his having entered a lion's cage in a circus that was visiting Southampton.

In his first season at the "Saints", Seeley was an understudy for Joe Turner and spent most of his time in the reserves. His only first-team appearance came on the left wing in a 1–1 draw with Tottenham Hotspur on 29 March 1897.

In the summer of 1897, Seeley moved to Bristol and, after a brief period with Bristol St George, he joined Eastville Rovers, playing in the Birmingham & District League, before returning to Southampton.

He re-signed for Southampton in the summer of 1898, by when his game had improved with experience. He was described as "speedy, versatile and a real trier", although "prone to inconsistency". He made one appearance in September (replacing Jim McKenzie), before a run of six games at outside-left from November to January and a final appearance in March, losing his place to Duncan McLean. His only goal came on 7 January 1899 at Sheppey United, when the "Saints" suffered their second defeat of the season, going down 2–1.

In the summer of 1899, he left Southampton and his career then involved time with other Southern League clubs, including New Brompton and Queens Park Rangers, before winding up his career in the East End of London.

He died on holiday at Ventnor on the Isle of Wight on 15 October 1921, aged 44.

== Honours ==
Southampton

- Southern League champions: 1898–99
