= Charles Leckie =

Scottish footballer

Personal information
- Full name: Charles Thomson Leckie
- Date of birth: 12 July 1875
- Place of birth: Alva, Clackmannanshire, Scotland
- Date of death: 1939 (aged 63–64)
- Position: Wing half

Senior career*
Years	Team	Apps	(Gls)
1898	Dundee	10	(1)
1898–1905	Derby County	126	(1)
Total		136	(2)
- * Club domestic league appearances and goals

Charles Thomson Leckie (12 July 1875 – 1939) was a Scottish footballer who played in the Scottish Football League for Dundee and in the Football League for Derby County.
