= Billy MacDonald (footballer, born 1877) =

Scottish footballer

Personal information
- Full name: William James MacDonald
- Date of birth: 1877
- Place of birth: Inverness, Scotland
- Date of death: 1966 (aged 89)
- Position: Inside left

Senior career*
Years	Team	Apps	(Gls)
1898	Dundee	14	(3)
1898–1900	Derby County	23	(4)
1900–1901	Dundee	6	(1)
1901–1902	Stoke	9	(3)
Total		52	(11)
- * Club domestic league appearances and goals

William James MacDonald (1877–1966) was a Scottish footballer who played in the Scottish Football League for Dundee, and in the Football League for Derby County and Stoke.

== Career ==
MacDonald was born in Inverness and began his career with Dundee. He joined English side Derby County in December 1898 and helped the Rams reach the 1899 FA Cup Final where they met Sheffield United, MacDonald played in the final as the Blades proved too sharp for Derby winning 4–1. He only played eight matches in 1899–1900 and left Derby at the end of the season. He returned to Dundee during the next season then joined Stoke where he played nine matches in 1901–02, scoring three goals.

== Career statistics ==
Club	Season	League			FA Cup		Total	
Club	Season	Division	Apps	Goals	Apps	Goals	Apps	Goals
Dundee	1898–99	Scottish Division One	14	3	0	0	14	3
Derby County	1898–99	First Division	16	3	5	3	21	6
Derby County	1899–1900	First Division	7	1	1	0	8	1
Dundee	1900–01	Scottish Division One	6	1	3	1	9	2
Stoke	1901–02	First Division	9	3	0	0	9	3
Career Total			52	11	9	4	61	15

== Honours ==
- FA Cup runner-up: 1898–99
