= Peter Robertson (footballer, born 1875) =

Scottish footballer

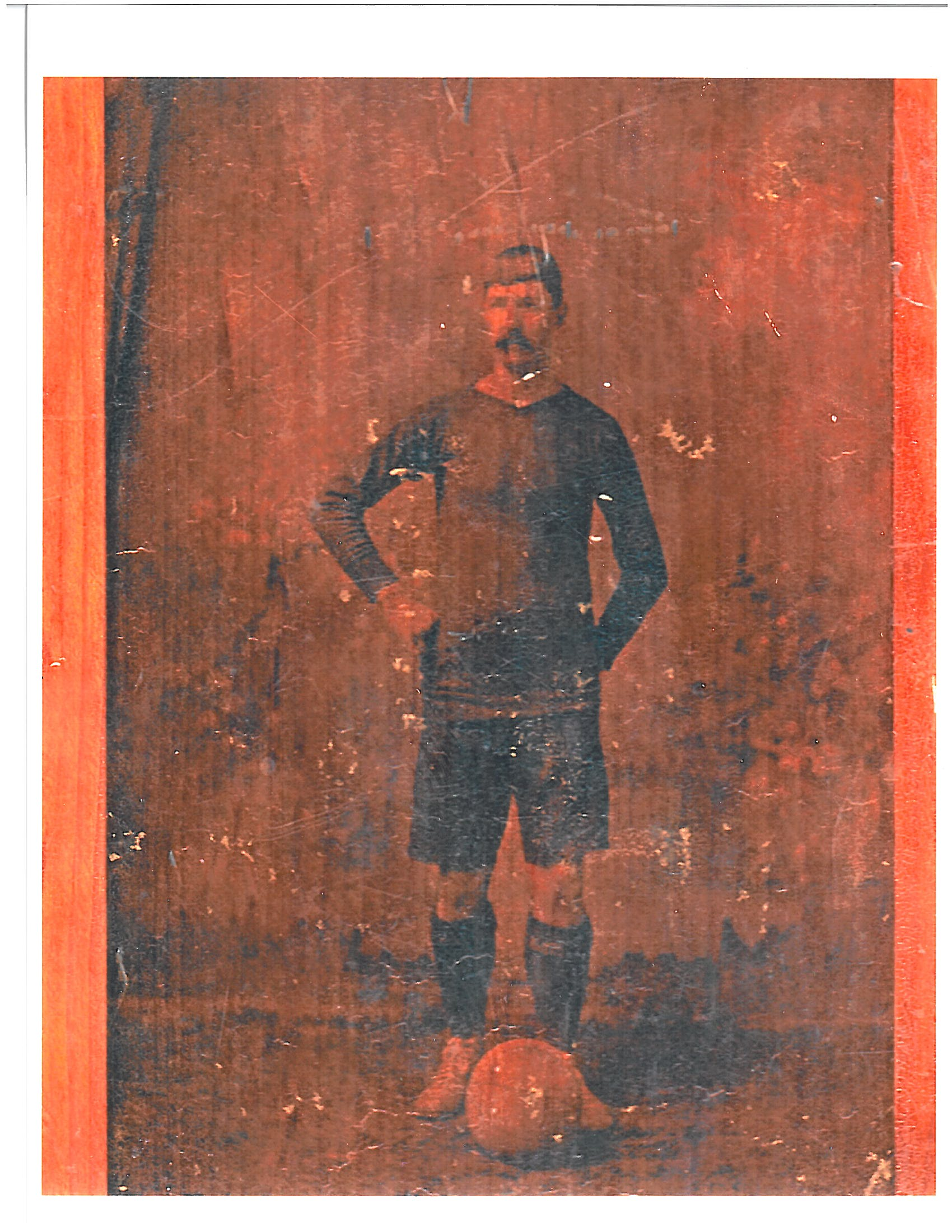

Personal information
- Full name: Peter Neilson Robertson
- Date of birth: 24 September 1875
- Place of birth: Rosewell, Scotland
- Date of death: 4 February 1929 (aged 53)
- Place of death: Benld, Illinois, United States
- Position: Half back

Senior career*
Years	Team	Apps	(Gls)
–1895	Polton Vale		
1895	Burnley	1	(0)
1896	St Bernard's		
1898–1899	Cowdenbeath		
1899–1901	Raith Rovers		
1901–1904	Dundee	51	(2)
1904	Nottingham Forest	0	(0)

International career
1902	Scottish League XI	1	(0)
1903	Scotland	1	(0)
- * Club domestic league appearances and goals

Peter Neilson Robertson (24 September 1875 – 4 February 1929) was a Scottish footballer.

== Career ==
Robertson initially played football for Polton Vale, a local club based in Loanhead. He soon attracted wider interest and played in one match for Football League First Division side Burnley in April 1895. He played his only senior match for the club on 9 November 1895 in the 1–5 defeat away at Derby County and was released by Burnley shortly afterwards.

Peter also turned out around then for the well known St Bernard's club in Edinburgh. Peter though remained with Polton Vale before joining Cowdenbeath in summer 1898. Most of his family all moved through to Fife as well. That was a top quality Cowdenbeath side. He played in a Cowdenbeath team which won 4 trophies in 1899. He was a highly regarded left half or centre half. He then joined Cowdenbeath's local rivals Raith Rovers and spent 2 years at Kirkcaldy.

In 1901, he joined city club Dundee and it was there that he enjoyed the peak of his career playing at the top level of Scottish professional football. He became club captain and achieved the great honour of being selected to represent Scotland v Ireland at Celtic Park, Glasgow on 21 March 1903. Scotland lost 2–0. In December 1903 though, injury struck when Peter was playing for Dundee against Motherwell. He badly hurt his knee and this more or less finished his football career. Peter visited Matlock down in England for treatment but struggled to overcome his injury. He did make a brief comeback with Nottingham Forest in 1904, but his injury badly hampered him. Thus he gave up football.

== Personal life ==
Robertson was the son of ironstone miner Sam Robertson and his wife Elizabeth Neilson. He was one of a number of siblings including his brother Sam who was born at Rosewell on 4 April 1878. After retiring as a professional footballer, he decided to emigrate to the United States and in July 1905 he set sail on the Furnessia. He went to live and work in Benld, Macoupin County, Illinois. Peter worked there as a miner for the Superior Coal Company of Sawyerville. Peter, who never married, died aged 53 on 4 February 1929 in St Francis Hospital, Litchfield, Illinois after a long illness.

Sam Robertson, his brother, joined Cowdenbeath in 1900 and also did well. In 1901, he joined Raith Rovers and then in 1902 teamed up with Peter at Dundee. Sam then came back to play for Cowdenbeath in 1903 as a full back. He was Cowdenbeath's captain. In 1905, he went down to England and played for Nottingham Forest's local rivals Notts County for a short time. He went to Benld in 1908 and accompanying Sam and his brother Willie on the trip was another ex-Cowdenbeath player, Jim Paton (who had also played with Notts County). Peter Robertson at one time lived in the US with a John Hynd who had been a goalkeeper with Cowdenbeath and Newcastle United in England. Pete Nisbet another Cowdenbeath stalwart of that era also moved to the US and settled in Benld. Sam Robertson died in Staunton, Macoupin County, Illinois on 1 November 1952.
