= Robert Buchanan (footballer, born 1867) =

Scottish footballer (1867–1909)

Personal information
- Full name: Robert John Buchanan
- Date of birth: 22 November 1867
- Place of birth: Edinburgh, Scotland
- Date of death: 1909 (aged 41–42)
- Place of death: Southwark, London, England
- Position: Forward

Youth career
- Johnstone

Senior career*
Years	Team	Apps	(Gls)
1887–1892	Abercorn		
1892	Sunderland Albion		
1892–1894	Burnley	40	(12)
1894–1896	Woolwich Arsenal	42	(16)
1896–1899	Southampton	41	(21)
1899–????	Sheppey United		

International career
1891	Scotland	1	(1)
- * Club domestic league appearances and goals

Robert John Buchanan (22 November 1867 – 1909) was a Scottish international footballer, who played as a forward in the 1890s.

== Playing career ==
=== Early career ===
Born in Edinburgh, he started his career as a youth player with Johnstone before joining Abercorn in 1887. Whilst on the books of Abercorn, he made his solitary international appearance for Scotland on 21 March 1891 scoring in a 4–3 victory over Wales.

He then moved to England to join the short-lived Sunderland Albion.

=== Burnley ===
After Sunderland Albion disbanded in May 1892, he transferred to Burnley, playing in the Football League First Division. In his first season he was top scorer (jointly with Billy Bowes) with eight goals from 22 appearances, helping Burnley to finish in sixth place, their highest league finish to date. The following season, Buchanan was less successful in front of goal with only four goals from his 18 appearances, but Burnley finished the season one place higher in the league table.

=== Woolwich Arsenal ===
In September 1894 he moved to join Woolwich Arsenal, for 1894–95, their second season in the Football League Second Division. Playing alongside Peter Mortimer and Paddy O'Brien, he contributed nine goals from his 25 appearances, which included a goal on his debut, in Arsenal's 4–2 win over Manchester City on 29 September 1894. The following season he made 17 appearances with seven goals, switching from centre forward to inside left. In total he scored 16 goals in 44 league and cup appearances for Arsenal.

=== Southampton ===
He moved to the south coast in the summer of 1896 to join Southern League team Southampton St. Mary's. The Southampton public took to him immediately and his "never-give-up" attitude earned him the nickname "Death or Glory Bob". In his first season with the "Saints" he was ever-present, scoring eleven league goals as Southampton took the Southern League title for the first time. He scored a hat trick in his second appearance, a 6–1 victory over Sheppey United on 26 September 1896. He also helped Southampton reach Round 2 of the FA Cup for the first time, where they went out to Newton Heath after a replay.

The following season, he was top-scorer with ten league and six FA Cup goals as the Saints again took the Southern League championship. Saints also had a superb run in the FA Cup reaching the semi final where they went out in a replay 2–0 to Nottingham Forest. In the cup run he scored "unlikely goals" against Leicester Fosse and Newcastle United.

Although he remained with Southampton for the 1898–98 season, he only played twice. After 57 appearances for the Saints with 33 goals, he moved back to south-east London to join Sheppey United.

== Later life ==
On retiring from the game, he settled in Sheerness, where he worked as an engine-fitter and died in Southwark in early 1909.

== Honours ==
Southampton

- Southern League championship: 1896–97 & 1897–98
