= Tom Smith (footballer, born 1877) =

English footballer (1877–??)

Personal information
- Full name: Thomas Smith
- Date of birth: 1877
- Place of birth: Ashton-in-Makerfield, England
- Date of death: Unknown
- Height: 5 ft 9 in (1.75 m)
- Position: Outside right

Youth career
- 1893–1895: Ashton Athletic

Senior career*
Years	Team	Apps	(Gls)
1895–1897	Ashton Town		
1897–1898	Preston North End	4	(0)
1898–1899	Southampton	14	(1)
1899–1900	Queens Park Rangers	21	(4)
1900–1901	Preston North End	2	(0)
- * Club domestic league appearances and goals

Thomas Smith (born 1877) was a professional English footballer who played at outside-right for various clubs around the turn of the 20th century.

== Football career ==
Smith was born in Ashton-in-Makerfield, Lancashire and played his early football for Ashton Athletic and Ashton Town in their pre-league era.

In May 1897, he joined Preston North End where another player of the same name was already playing, also as an outside-forward. Smith made four appearances in the Football League First Division, plus one in the FA Cup, before Preston made both players available at the end of the season. The directors of Southampton agreed to sign him, apparently under the misapprehension that they were signing the other player, who had established a reputation for being a "star". (The other Tom Smith went on to have a long career with Tottenham Hotspur, including scoring the second goal as the "Spurs" defeated Sheffield United to win the 1901 FA Cup Final.)

At the "Saints", Smith won the 100 yard sprint in the club's annual sports day, encouraging the directors to believe that they had signed the right player. The "Saints" were about to embark on their first season in their new stadium and Smith made his debut for Southampton in the opening match at The Dell, against Brighton United on 3 September 1898. Smith scored the final goal in a 4–1 victory - the goal was described as "just such a goal as there is no doubt about – a shot which beats the goalkeeper almost before it is made".

Despite this auspicious start, Smith's subsequent indifferent form led the directors to realise that they had acquired the services of the wrong player, and by February Smith had lost his place, initially to Tom Nicol and then to Jimmy Yates. Smith left the Saints in the summer of 1899, to join Queens Park Rangers for their first season in the Southern League.

He returned to Preston in 1900 and spent one further season in the Football League, making two more appearances.

== Honours ==
Southampton

- Southern League champions: 1898–99
