= 1898–99 Southern Football League =

The 1898–99 season was the fifth in the history of the Southern League. This season saw the expansion of Division One up to 14 teams and the creation of Division Two South-West, though it was disbanded at the end of the season after all its clubs left. No Southern League clubs applied for promotion to the Football League. Southampton were Division One champions for the third season in a row. Overall Division Two champions being decided in a playoff in which Thames Ironworks defeated Cowes 3–1 at The Den.

== Division One ==
Southern Football League Division One
- Season: 1898–99
- Champions: Southampton (3rd title)
- Promoted: none
- Relegated: Warmley (resigned); Royal Artillery Portsmouth (test match losers)
- Matches: 156
- Goals: 506 (3.24 per match)

A total of 14 teams contest the division, including ten sides from the previous season and four new teams.

Teams promoted from 1897 to 1898 Division Two:

- Royal Artillery Portsmouth - test matches winners
- Warmley - test matches winners

Newly elected teams:

- Bedminster (elected from the Western League)
- Brighton United

Pos	Team	Pld	W	D	L	GF	GA	GR	Pts	Qualification or relegation
1	Southampton	24	15	5	4	54	24	2.250	35	
2	Bristol City	24	15	3	6	55	33	1.667	33	
3	Millwall Athletic	24	12	6	6	59	35	1.686	30	
4	Chatham Town	24	10	8	6	32	23	1.391	28	
5	Reading	24	9	8	7	31	24	1.292	26	
6	New Brompton	24	10	5	9	38	30	1.267	25	
7	Tottenham Hotspur	24	10	4	10	40	36	1.111	24	
8	Bedminster	24	10	4	10	35	39	0.897	24	
9	Swindon Town	24	9	5	10	43	49	0.878	23	
10	Brighton United	24	9	2	13	37	48	0.771	20	
11	Gravesend United	24	7	5	12	42	52	0.808	19	
12	Sheppey United	24	5	3	16	23	53	0.434	13	Relegation test matches
13	Royal Artillery Portsmouth	24	4	4	16	17	60	0.283	12	Relegation test matches. Disbanded at end of season after relegation
14	Warmley	0	0	0	0	0	0	—	0	Resigned from League after 17 matches, record expunged

Source: rsssf.com
Rules for classification: The system of using goal average to separate two teams tied on points was used until the 1976-77 season. The points system: 2 points for a win, 1 point for a draw and 0 points for losing.

== Division Two London ==
Southern Football League Division Two London
- Season: 1898–99
- Champions: Thames Ironworks
- Promoted: none
- Relegated: St Albans (folded); Uxbridge (resigned)
- Matches: 132
- Goals: 597 (4.52 per match)

Division Two London was formed on the basis of the previous season's Division Two. A total of 12 teams contest the division, including eight sides from the previous season and four new teams.

Team relegated from Division One:

- Wolverton L&NWR - test matches losers

Newly elected teams:

- Thames Ironworks - London League winners
- Brentford
- Fulham

Pos	Team	Pld	W	D	L	GF	GA	GR	Pts	Qualification or relegation
1	Thames Ironworks	22	19	1	2	64	16	4.000	39	Promotion test matches
2	Wolverton L&NWR	22	13	4	5	88	43	2.047	30	
3	Watford	22	14	2	6	62	35	1.771	30	
4	Brentford	22	11	3	8	59	39	1.513	25	
5	Wycombe Wanderers	22	10	2	10	55	57	0.965	22	
6	Southall	22	11	0	11	44	55	0.800	22	
7	Chesham (Note: Changed name to Chesham Town at the end of the season)	22	9	2	11	45	62	0.726	20	
8	St Albans	22	8	3	11	45	59	0.763	19	Folded at end of season
9	Shepherds Bush	22	7	3	12	37	53	0.698	17	
10	Fulham	22	6	4	12	36	44	0.818	16	
11	Uxbridge	22	7	2	13	29	48	0.604	16	Left league at end of season
12	Maidenhead	22	3	2	17	33	86	0.384	8	

Source: rsssf.com
Rules for classification: The system of using goal average to separate two teams tied on points was used until the 1976-77 season. The points system: 2 points for a win, 1 point for a draw and 0 points for losing.

== Division Two South-West ==
Southern Football League Division Two South-West
- Season: 1898–99
- Champions: Cowes
- Promoted: none
- Relegated: league disbanded
- Matches: 30
- Goals: 160 (5.33 per match)

Division Two South-West was a newly formed and short-lived formation. At the end of the season, the division was liquidated and the League returned to a 2-division structure.

Pos	Team	Pld	W	D	L	GF	GA	GR	Pts	Qualification or relegation
1	Cowes	10	10	0	0	52	10	5.200	20	Promotion test matches
2	Ryde	10	7	0	3	30	11	2.727	14	Left league at end of season
3	Freemantle	10	5	0	5	21	32	0.656	10	Left league at end of season
4	Sandown Bay	10	4	0	6	22	34	0.647	8	Left league at end of season
5	Eastleigh Athletic	10	2	0	8	19	32	0.594	4	Left league at end of season
6	Andover	10	2	0	8	16	41	0.390	4	Left league at end of season
7	East Lancs Regiment	0	0	0	0	0	0	—	0	Resigned from league after three matches, record expunged
8	Trowbridge Town	0	0	0	0	0	0	—	0	Resigned from league after three matches, record expunged

Source: rsssf.com
Rules for classification: The system of using goal average to separate two teams tied on points was used until the 1976-77 season. The points system: 2 points for a win, 1 point for a draw and 0 points for losing.

== Promotion-relegation test matches ==
At the end of the season, test matches were held between the bottom two clubs in Division One and the top club in both Division Twos. Royal Artillery Portsmouth lost 4–1 to Cowes and were relegated to Division Two, whilst Cowes were promoted. Royal Artillery Portsmouth then disbanded. Sheppey United and Thames Ironworks drew 1-1, leading to Sheppey remaining in Division One and Thames Ironworks joining them.

Division One clubs	v	Division Two clubs

Royal Artillery Portsmouth	1 – 4	Cowes

Sheppey United	1 – 1	Thames Ironworks
