= Danny Hatcher =

English footballer

Danni Hatcher
Personal information
- Date of birth: 24 December 1983 (age 42)
- Place of birth: Newport, Isle of Wight, England
- Position: Forward

Team information
- Current team: Brading Town

Senior career*
Years	Team	Apps	(Gls)
2000–2003	Leyton Orient	16	(0)
2003–2004	Newport (IOW)	20	(2)
- Shanklin
- Cowes Sports
2015–	Brading Town		
- * Club domestic league appearances and goals

Daniel Ian Hatcher (born 24 December 1983) is an English former professional footballer who played in the Football League, as a forward.
