= Ryde Sports F.C. =

- Full name: Ryde Sports Football Club
- Founded: 1888
- Dissolved: 1997
- Ground: Smallbrook Stadium, Ryde
- Capacity: 2,000
Home colours	Away colours

Ryde Sports F.C. were an English football club based in Ryde, Isle of Wight.

Before their untimely demise, they were for many years a successful and significant club in the area and an important part of the town.

== History ==
Ryde Sports were founded in 1888 and became one of the eight founder members of the Hampshire League in 1896. Although finishing at the foot of the table in the inaugural season, the club soon improved by twice finishing runners-up, they also spent the 1898-99 season in the Southern League where they finished as runner-up in the short lived Division 2 South & West Section. The 1899-1900 season was a highly successful one in which they won the Hampshire League and Hampshire Senior Cup double. After the Great War, Ryde joined the Isle of Wight League, twice being champions before returning the county fold in 1923 when they promptly won the East Division title at the first attempt. Further success soon arrived, in 1925-26 they were league champions and Hampshire Senior Cup winners the following year.

The thirties continued to be very successful for the club, twice more winning County Senior Cup 1935–36 and 1938–39. The league title eluded Ryde during this period, although a top five final position was achieved each season. It was also during this period that Ryde recorded some fine runs in the FA Cup, most notably when they twice reached the 1st Round proper; in 1932–33 they lost 0–5 away v Margate, then in 1936–37, when they lost 1–5 at home to Gillingham in front of a record 5,000 crowd. They nearly made it again in 1947–48, when after navigating their way past some tough opponents they lost 0–1 at home against Trowbridge Town in the final qualifying round.

It was not until the 1952–53 season that the club suffered its first setback when, for the first time, they were relegated. After several years of consolidation Ryde returned as Division 2 runners-up in 1957–58, only to be relegated straight back again. Worse was to follow in 1963–64 when Ryde were relegated again to Division 3 but made a good recovery by immediately returning as champions; and in 1967–68 they finished as runners-up in Division 2, which was enough to clinch promotion back to the top flight.

The seventies continued to up and down for Ryde. After two seasons in Division 1 the club was again relegated in 1969–70 and in 1976–77 again dropped down into Division 3. The early Eighties saw troubled times for Ryde, twice finishing bottom of the league and having to apply for re-election. Ryde's reserve side, however, fared better in the IOW league beating Newport IOW 1-0 in the IOW Challenge Cup Final in 1983 with a last minute winner from striker Tony Adams. Many of the reserve players moved to the first team the following season under manager Arnie Olive.

Ryde regained its place and slowly rebuilt, and in 1986 were placed in restructured Division 2 following the formation of the Wessex League.

Finally, their fortunes changed and with a powerful side Ryde won the Division 2 and Division 1 titles in successive seasons 1988–89 and 1989–90. For a number of years, developers had been eyeing up the club's much loved Partlands home, and in 1990 they vacated the premises to play at a new multi-purpose Sports Complex at Smallbrook Stadium, on the outskirts of the town. The team was elected to the Wessex League that year.

Ryde initially did well and were frequently in the top half of the table, with their highest positions being 3rd in 1995–96 and 4th a year later. Sadly, this did not last and a combination of poor attendances and high overhead costs put them in financial difficulty, resulting in a player exodus.

For the 1997–98 campaign, Ryde appointed Larry Clay, who brought with him a youthful group of players from the mainland, all of whom ended up playing in the first team far sooner than intended. These youngsters included Hose Edin, Peter Williams and Lee Johnson. The club played a friendly against Bristol City at Smallbrook Stadium with the professional side winning 7-0 with a certain Shaun Goater scoring five goals, he was soon signed by Manchester City.

The inexperienced team made a disastrous start to the season, suffering some heavy defeats as they soon hit rock bottom. After an unsuccessful appeal for local support, Ryde withdrew from the competition in December 1997 with their playing record (just 2 points gained from 17 games) being expunged.

A phoenix club, Ryde '98 was immediately formed to play in the local Isle of Wight League but the new team never climbed out of the basement division and folded in 2004.

== Honours ==
- Southern League
  - Division 2 South & West Section Runners-up 1898/99
- Hampshire League
  - Division 1 Champions 1899/1900, 1925/26 and 1989/90, Runners-up 1897/98, 1898/99 and 1932/33
  - Division 2 Champions 1988/89, Runners-up 1957/58 and 1967/68
  - Division 3 Champions 1964/65
  - East Division Champions 1923/24
- Isle of Wight League
  - Division 1 Champions 1919/20 and 1920/21
- Hampshire Football Association
  - Senior Cup Winners 1899/1900, 1903/04, 1926/27, 1936/37 and 1938/39, Finalists 1925/26 and 1935/36
- Isle of Wight Football Association
  - Gold Cup Winners 1926/27, 1946/47, 1948/49, 1955/56, 1961/62, 1962/63, 1963/64 and 1990/91, Finalists 1927/28, 1928/29, 1929/30, 1930/31, 1932/33, 1933/34, 1947/48, 1950/51, 1956/57, 1960/61 and 1964/65.
  - Challenge Cup Winners 1888/89,1962/63, 1963/64, 1982/83, 1992/93 and 1993/94
- Portsmouth Football Association
  - Senior Cup Winners 1899/1900, 1900/01, 1905/06, 1919/20, 1953/54, 1966/67 and 1989/90

== Playing records ==
=== League ===
Season	Division	Position	Significant events
1896/97	Hampshire League	8/8	Founder Members, re-elected
1897/98	Hampshire League	6/8	
1898/99	Southern League Division 2 South & West Section	2/6	Runners-up, left competition
	Hampshire League	3/8	
1899/1900	Hampshire League	1/8	Champions, left league
1900-03	Isle of Wight League		
1903/04	Hampshire League South Division	3/9	
1904/05	Hampshire League South Division	6/9	
1905/06	Hampshire League South Division	3/8	
1906/07	Hampshire League South Division	3/8	
1907/08	Hampshire League South Division	6/10	
1908/09	Hampshire League South Division	6/8	
1909/10	Hampshire League South Division	8/10	
1910/11	Hampshire League South Division	5/9	
1911/12	Hampshire League South Division	6/8	left competition
1912-23	Isle of Wight League		
1923/24	Hampshire League East Division	1/8	Champions, promoted
1924/25	Hampshire League County Division	10/16	
1925/26	Hampshire League County Division	1/16	Champions
1926/27	Hampshire League County Division	5/16	
1927/28	Hampshire League County Division	6/16	Re-organisation
1928/29	Hampshire League South Division	7/13	Re-organisation
1929/30	Hampshire League Division 1	9/16	
1930/31	Hampshire League Division 1	6/16	
1931/32	Hampshire League Division 1	3/16	
1932/33	Hampshire League Division 1	2/15	Runners-up
1933/34	Hampshire League Division 1	5/16	
1934/35	Hampshire League Division 1	12/16	
1935/36	Hampshire League Division 1	3/16	
1936/37	Hampshire League Division 1	5/16	
1937/38	Hampshire League Division 1	5/16	
1938/39	Hampshire League Division 1	5/16	
1939-45			
1945/46	Hampshire League Division 1	9/16	
1946/47	Hampshire League Division 1	11/14	
1947/48	Hampshire League Division 1	4/14	
1948/49	Hampshire League Division 1	5/14	
1949/50	Hampshire League Division 1	4/14	
1950/51	Hampshire League Division 1	11/14	
1951/52	Hampshire League Division 1	12/14	
1952/53	Hampshire League Division 1	13/14	Relegated
1953/54	Hampshire League Division 2	5/14	
1954/55	Hampshire League Division 2	12/14	
1955/56	Hampshire League Division 2	6/16	
1956/57	Hampshire League Division 2	5/16	
1957/58	Hampshire League Division 2	2/16	Runners-up, promoted
1958/59	Hampshire League Division 1	14/14	Relegated
1959/60	Hampshire League Division 2	11/16	
1960/61	Hampshire League Division 2	5/16	
1961/62	Hampshire League Division 2	8/16	
1962/63	Hampshire League Division 2	10/16	
1963/64	Hampshire League Division 2	15/16	Relegated
1964/65	Hampshire League Division 3	1/16	Champions, promoted
1965/66	Hampshire League Division 2	9/16	
1966/67	Hampshire League Division 2	8/16	
1967/68	Hampshire League Division 2	2/16	Runners-up, promoted
1968/69	Hampshire League Division 1	11/16	
1969/70	Hampshire League Division 1	16/16	Relegated
1970/71	Hampshire League Division 2	10/16	
1971/72	Hampshire League Division 2	13/16	
1972/73	Hampshire League Division 2	11/16	
1973/74	Hampshire League Division 2	11/16	
1974/75	Hampshire League Division 2	13/16	
1975/76	Hampshire League Division 2	16/16	Not relegated
1976/77	Hampshire League Division 2	15/16	Relegated
1977/78	Hampshire League Division 3	11/16	
1978/79	Hampshire League Division 3	12/16	
1979/80	Hampshire League Division 3	12/15	
1980/81	Hampshire League Division 3	17/18	Re-elected
1981/82	Hampshire League Division 3	16/16	Re-elected
1982/83	Hampshire League Division 3	12/15	
1983/84	Hampshire League Division 3	14/18	
1984/85	Hampshire League Division 3	15/18	
1985/86	Hampshire League Division 3	10/18	
1986/87	Hampshire League Division 2	11/18	Re-organisation due to creation of Wessex League
1987/88	Hampshire League Division 2	14/19	
1988/89	Hampshire League Division 2	1/19	Champions, promoted
1989/90	Hampshire League Division 1	1/18	Champions, promoted
1990/91	Wessex League	11/20	
1991/92	Wessex League	7/19	
1992/93	Wessex League	6/21	
1993/94	Wessex League	12/22	
1994/95	Wessex League	12/22	
1995/96	Wessex League	3/21	
1996/97	Wessex League	4/21	
1997/98	Wessex League	21/21	Withdrew, record expunged

=== FA Cup ===
Season	Round	Opponents	Result
1898/99	1st Qualifying Round	A v Bedminster	L 1-3
1899/1900	1st Qualifying Round	A v Portsmouth	L 0–10
1904/05	1st Qualifying Round	A v Cowes	L 2-4
1905/06	Preliminary Round	A v Basingstoke Town	W 3-1
	1st Qualifying Round	A v Eastleigh Athletic	L 1-2
1906/07	1st Qualifying Round	A v 2nd Lancashire Regiment	L 0-2
1907/08	1st Qualifying Round	A v South Farnborough Athletic	W 4-3
	2nd Qualifying Round	H v Eastleigh Athletic	L 1-5
1908/09	1st Qualifying Round	H v South Farnborough Athletic	W 5-1
	2nd Qualifying Round	H v Cowes	L 0-2
1910/11	1st Qualifying Round	H v Southampton Cambridge	L 1-3
1911/12	1st Qualifying Round	A v Royal Engineers (Aldershot)	L 0-6
1921/22	Extra-Preliminary Round	H v Poole Town	L 2-3
1922/23	Preliminary Round	H v Osborne Athletic	W 1-0
	1st Qualifying Round	A v Gosport Athletic	L 1-2
1923/24	Preliminary Round	H v Poole Town	W 6-2
	1st Qualifying Round	A v Cowes	L 0-4
1924/25	Preliminary Round	H v Osborne Athletic	W 6-3
	1st Qualifying Round	H v Poole Town	L 1-2
1925/26	Preliminary Round	H v Cowes	W 4-2
	1st Qualifying Round	H v Portsea Island Gas Co	L 2-5
1926/27	1st Qualifying Round	H v Royal Marines Portsmouth	L 1-3
1927/28	Preliminary Round	H v East Cowes Victoria	W 8-0
	1st Qualifying Round	H v RAOC Cosham	W 3-0
	2nd Qualifying Round	A v Royal Marines Portsmouth	D 1-1
	Replay	H v Royal Marines Portsmouth	W 3-2
	3rd Qualifying Round	H v Weymouth	D 3-3
	Replay	A v Weymouth	D 2-2
	2nd Replay	N v Weymouth	W 4-1
	4th Qualifying Round	A v Poole Town	D 3-3
	Replay	H v Poole Town	D 1-1
	2nd Replay	N v Poole Town	L 1-2
1928/29	Preliminary Round	A v Emsworth	D 1-1
	Replay	H v Emsworth	D 2-2
	2nd Replay	N v Emsworth	L 1-2
1929/30	Preliminary Round	H v RAOC Hilsea	D 1-1
	Replay	A v RAOC Hilsea	L 2-3
1930/31	Preliminary Round	A v Newport	L 1-2
1931/32	Preliminary Round	A v Cowes	L 2-3
1932/33	Preliminary Round	H v Shaftesbury	W 6-2
	1st Qualifying Round	H v Bournemouth Tramways	W 6-2
	2nd Qualifying Round	A v Gosport	W 3-1
	3rd Qualifying Round	A v RAOC Hilsea	W 2-1
	4th Qualifying Round	H v Metropolitan Police	W 1-0
	1st Round	A v Margate	L 0–5
1933/34	1st Qualifying Round	H v Poole Town	W 4-1
	2nd Qualifying Round	H v Bournemouth	W 5-0
	3rd Qualifying Round	H v Gosport	W 5-1
	4th Qualifying Round	A v London Paper Mills	L 2-4
1934/35	Preliminary Round	H v Bournemouth	W 6-2
	1st Qualifying Round	A v Newport	D 1-1
	Replay	H v Newport	L 1-2
1935/36	Preliminary Round	H v Osborne Athletic	W 9-0
	1st Qualifying Round	A v Salisbury City	W 6-4
	2nd Qualifying Round	H v Salisbury Corinthians	L 1-2
1936/37	Preliminary Round	H v East Cowes Victoria	W 3-2
	1st Qualifying Round	H v Basingstoke Town	W 4-2
	2nd Qualifying Round	A v Gosport	W 2-1
	3rd Qualifying Round	A v Salisbury City	D 0-0
	Replay	H v Salisbury City	W 1-0
	4th Qualifying Round	A v Wells City	D 1-1
	Replay	H v Wells City	W 8–1
	1st Round	H v Gillingham	L 1–5
1937/38	Preliminary Round	H v HMS Excellent	L 2-3
1938/39	Preliminary Round	A v Cowes	D 1-1
	Replay	H v Cowes	W 5-1
	1st Qualifying Round	A v Salisbury City	D 2-2
	Replay	H v Salisbury City	W 5-0
	2nd Qualifying Round	H v Newport	L 0-1
1945/46	1st Qualifying Round	H v Cowes	L 1–3
1946/47	1st Qualifying Round	H v Gosport Borough	L 1–8
1947/48	Preliminary Round	A v Sandown	D 2-2
	Replay	H v Sandown	W 4–1
	1st Qualifying Round	H v Thornycroft Athletic	W 3–0
	2nd Qualifying Round	H v Poole Town	W 2–1
	3rd Qualifying Round	A v Gosport Borough	W 2–1
	4th Qualifying Round	H v Trowbridge Town	L 0–1
1948/49	Preliminary Round	A v Dorchester Town	W 2–0
	1st Qualifying Round	H v Poole Town	L 0–1
1949/50	Extra-Preliminary Round	H v Andover	W 1–0
	Preliminary Round	H v Newport	D 1-1
	Replay	A v Newport	W 5–3
	1st Qualifying Round	H v Weymouth	L 2–6
1950/51	Extra-Preliminary Round	H v Andover	W 2–1
	Preliminary Round	H v Dorchester Town	D 3-3
	Replay	A v Dorchester Town	L 2–4
1951/52	1st Qualifying Round	A v Totton	L 0–3
1952/53	1st Qualifying Round	H v Alton Town	L 3–4
1958/59	Preliminary Round	A v Fareham Town	L 2–4
1968/69	1st Qualifying Round	H v Salisbury	L 1–7
1969/70	Preliminary Round	H v Salisbury	D 1-1
	Replay	A v Salisbury	L 2–3
1970/71	1st Qualifying Round	H v Newport	L 0–3
1971/72	1st Qualifying Round	H v Thornycroft Athletic	L 1–4
1972/73	1st Qualifying Round	A v Gosport Borough	L 0–2
1973/74	1st Qualifying Round	A v Bognor Regis Town	L 0–3
1974/75	1st Qualifying Round	A v Gosport Borough	L 1–7
1975/76	1st Qualifying Round	H v Guildford & Dorking United	L 0–4
1992/93	Preliminary Round	H v Southwick	L 1–2
1993/94	Preliminary Round	A v AFC Totton	D 1-1
	Replay	H v AFC Totton	L 1–3
1994/95	Preliminary Round	H v Thatcham Town	W 3–2
	1st Qualifying Round	A v Poole Town	L 1–5
1995/96	Preliminary Round	A v Bemerton Heath Harlequins	W 3–2
	1st Qualifying Round	H v Weymouth	D 1-1
	Replay	A v Weymouth	L 1–2
1996/97	Preliminary Round	A v Gosport Borough	L 1–2

=== FA Amateur Cup ===
Season	Round	Opponents	Result
1905/06	1st Qualifying Round	A v Winchester City	W 2-0
	2nd Qualifying Round	A v Gosport United	L 1-5
1906/07	1st Qualifying Round	H v Gosport United	D 2-2
	Replay	A v Gosport United	W 4-0
	2nd Qualifying Round	A v 2nd Lincolnshire Regiment	W 2-0
1907/08	2nd Qualifying Round	H v United Services Officers	W 4-2
	3rd Qualifying Round	H v Gosport United	W 5-2
	4th Qualifying Round	H v 2nd Lincolnshire Regiment	L 1-2
1908/09	2nd Qualifying Round	A v RFA Farnborough	L 2-4
1910/11	2nd Qualifying Round	A v East Cowes Victoria	L 1-2
1920/21	1st Qualifying Round	A v Poole Town	L 2-3
1922/23	1st Qualifying Round	A v RN Depot (Portsmouth)	L 1-3
1923/24	1st Qualifying Round	A v Osborne Athletic	W 5-3
	2nd Qualifying Round	A v 2nd Argyll & Sutherland Highlanders	L 0-5
1924/25	1st Qualifying Round	H v Portsea Island Gas Co	L 2-7
1925/26	1st Qualifying Round	A v Gosport Albion	L 1-3
1928/29	1st Qualifying Round	H v HMS Victory	W 4-2
	2nd Qualifying Round	H v Lymington Town	W 7-3
	3rd Qualifying Round	A v Fareham	L 1-2
1930/31	1st Qualifying Round	A v Osborne Athletic	W 7-3
	2nd Qualifying Round	H v Portsmouth Gas Co	W 4-0
	3rd Qualifying Round	A v RAOC Hilsea	W 2-0
	4th Qualifying Round	A v 2nd Kings Royal Rifles	D 4-4
	Replay	H v 2nd Kings Royal Rifles	W 4-2
	Round 1	H v Maidenhead United	D 5-5
	Replay	A v Maidenhead United	L 1-6
1931/32	1st Qualifying Round	H v HMS Victory	W 2-0
	2nd Qualifying Round	A v Blandford United	W 7-0
	3rd Qualifying Round	H v Poole Town	W 7-1
	4th Qualifying Round	A v Bournemouth Gasworks Athletic	L 1-3
1932/33	1st Qualifying Round	A v RAOC Hilsea	W 3-0
	2nd Qualifying Round	A v HMS Excellent	L 2-3
1933/34	1st Qualifying Round	H v Ringwood Town	L 3-4
1934/35	1st Qualifying Round	A v Dorchester Town	W 11-1
	2nd Qualifying Round	A v SR Eastleigh Athletic	L 1-2
1935/36	Preliminary Round	A v Wimborne Town	L 1-3
1938/39	Preliminary Round	H v Fareham	W 3-1
	1st Qualifying Round	H v HMS Excellent	L 2-3
1945/46	2nd Qualifying Round	H v Gosport Borough	W 4-1
	3rd Qualifying Round	A v Totton	L 2-5
1946/47	1st Qualifying Round	H v Lymington Town	W 3-1
	2nd Qualifying Round	H v Dorchester Town	L 1-2
1947/48	1st Qualifying Round	H v Fareham Town	W 3–0
	2nd Qualifying Round	A v Dorchester Town	D 1–1
	Replay	H v Dorchester Town	W 3-1
	3rd Qualifying Round	A v Portsmouth Electricity	L 2–4
1948/49	Round 1	H v Clevedon	L 2–4
1949/50	4th Qualifying Round	A v Frome Town	W 5–0
	Round 1	A v Cheshunt	L 1-2
1950/51	4th Qualifying Round	H v Gosport Borough	L 0-2
1951/52	Preliminary Round	H v Fareham Town	L 0–5
1952/53	Extra-Preliminary Round	A v RAMC Aldershot	D 2–2
	Replay	H v RAMC Aldershot	L 0-1
1953/54	Preliminary Round	H v Winchester city	D 2–2
	Replay	A v Winchester City	L 0-2
1954/55	Preliminary Round	H v Gosport Borough	L 2–5
1955/56	Preliminary Round	H v Romsey Town	W 6–0
	1st Qualifying Round	H v Wimborne Town	W 6-1
	2nd Qualifying Round	A v Hamworthy	W 4-3
	3rd Qualifying Round	A v Winchester City	W 2-0
	4th Qualifying Round	H v Alton Town	L 2-4
1955/57	Preliminary Round	H v Pirelli General	L 1-3
1957/58	Preliminary Round	H v Pirelli General	D 1-1
	Replay	A v Pirelli General	L 2-3
1958/59	Preliminary Round	H v Waterlooville	W 4-3
	1st Qualifying Round	A v Fareham Town	D 4-4
	Replay	H v Fareham Town	L 2-3
1959/60	Preliminary Round	A v Waterlooville	L 0-4
1960/61	Preliminary Round	H v Netley Sports	L 2-3
1961/62	1st Qualifying Round	H v Gosport Borough	L 2–7
1962/63	Preliminary Round	H v Winchester City	W 2-1
	1st Qualifying Round	A v Swaythling Athletic	W 3-2
	2nd Qualifying Round	A v Alton Town	L 3-5
1963/64	Preliminary Round	H v Netley Sports	W 1-0
	1st Qualifying Round	A v Fareham Town	L 0-7
1965/66	Preliminary Round	H v Netley Sports	L 1–5
1966/67	1st Qualifying Round	H v Portsmouth RN	L 1–2
1967/68	Preliminary Round	H v Alton Town	D 3-3
	Replay	A v Alton Town	L 1–3
1968/69	Preliminary Round	A v Swaythling Athletic	L 0-3

=== FA Vase ===
Season	Round	Opponents	Result
1991/92	Extra-Preliminary Round	H v Kintbury Rangers	W 3–2
	Preliminary Round	A v AFC Lymington	L 0–1
1992/93	Extra-Preliminary Round	H v Wantage Town	L 1–2
1993/94	Preliminary Round	A v Hamworthy United	W 5–1
	Round 1	H v Andover	L 0–3
1994/95	Preliminary Round	A v Banbury United	L 0–3
1995/96	1st Qualifying Round	A v Brockenhurst	W 4–0
	2nd Qualifying Round	A v Bicester Town	D 1-1
	Replay	H v Bicester Town	W 3–1
	Round 1	A v Whitstable Town	L 0–4
1996/97	1st Qualifying Round	A v North Leigh	L 0–1

== Ground ==
Until 1990, Ryde Sports played at Partlands - a picturesque ground in the town. The venue was enclosed with two stands and a large pavilion. The record attendance was 5,000 for the 1936 FA Cup tie against Gillingham.

In order to progress, the club then moved to the newly opened Smallbrook Stadium, Ashley Road, Ryde, PO33 4BH. They hosted a series of prestigious friendly fixtures against Football League opponents - with the visit of West Bromwich Albion for the official ground opening match attracting a record 2,000 crowd. However, despite initial success on the pitch, attendances dropped mainly due to the venues remote location on the outskirts of town and the soulless atmosphere caused by the distance between the 300 seater stand and the pitch.

The venue is now used by Ryde Saints and Wessex League football returned for the 2022-23 season, when Newport took up temporary residence.

The stadium is also home to Isle of Wight Warriors speedway.

== Notable players ==
- See Ryde Sports players.

== Local rivals ==
Ryde Sports had a long running rivalry with Cowes Sports, East Cowes Vics, Sandown, Newport and Brading Town. Meetings in the Hampshire League and Wessex League always generated much interest and attracted large crowds.

== Successor club ==
The town is now represented by Ryde Saints who play at the Smallbrook Stadium.

Founded in 1995, they are a Charter Standard Club affiliated to the Hampshire Football Association and have two adult teams playing in the Isle of Wight League along with a youth set-up. Their greatest achievement came in 2017 when they won the Hampshire Junior 'A' Cup.

== Print ==
- Ryde for Pride - 100 Years of Ryde Sports by Mike Bull
