= Penk =

Penk may refer to:

- Penk (surname), several people
- River Penk
- Penk (Star Trek)
- Proenkephalin or PENK. A name of gene encoding a precursor of enkephalin and other related peptides.
