= BTFC =

BTFC can refer to one of the following English football clubs:

- Banbridge Town F.C.
- Barnoldswick Town F.C.
- Basingstoke Town F.C.
- Beckenham Town F.C.
- Bedford Town F.C.
- Bedlington Terriers F.C.
- Belper Town F.C.
- Berkhamsted Town F.C.
- Bicester Town F.C.
- Billericay Town F.C.
- Billingham Town F.C.
- Boston Town F.C.
- Bourne Town F.C.
- Brackley Town F.C.
- Bracknell Town F.C.
- Brading Town F.C.
- Braintree Town F.C.
- Brentwood Town F.C.
- Bridgnorth Town F.C.
- Bridlington Town F.C.
- Brigg Town F.C.
- Buckingham Town F.C.
- Buckley Town F.C.
- Bury Town F.C.

== See also ==
- Bridlington Town A.F.C.
