= Sandown & Lake F.C. =

- Full name: Sandown & Lake Football Club
- Founded: 1880
- Ground: Bay Academy, Sandown
- Chairman: Steve Berry
- Manager: Kyle Brookes
- League: Isle of Wight League Division 1
- Website: https://sandownlakefc.co.uk/
| Home colours | Away colours |

Sandown & Lake F.C. are an amateur football club based in Sandown, Isle of Wight.

The club are affiliated to the Hampshire Football Association and consist of two adult teams playing in the Isle of Wight League and nine youth teams at various age groups.

== History ==
Originally founded in 1880 as Sandown Bay, the club initially played friendly matches until becoming founder members of the Isle of Wight League.

In 1898 they joined the Southern League where they finished 4th in the short lived Division 2 South & West Section. At the same time, they also played in the Hampshire League but dropped out in 1900 after finishing bottom.

They returned to the county league in 1903 as Sandown & Lake United, but after finishing bottom of the South Division five years running they left again before the Great War.

The twenties saw an upturn in fortunes. Now known as Sandown, they twice won Isle of Wight Gold Cup and the Hampshire Intermediate Cup once. This saw a return to the Hampshire League, where they consolidated before once again returning to Island football in 1930. The Gold Cup was won again before the outbreak of World War II.

After moving to Fairway Park, the post-war era saw renewed interest as Sandown began entering national cup competitions and returned to the Hampshire League. This this time their fortunes were much improved - regularly playing to large crowds, they twice won the Division 3 East title and after challenging for promotion they won the Division 2 title in 1957. They spent two short stays in the top flight, which at time was extremely tough, consisting of the top non-league clubs in the area.

In 1959, Sandown won the Gold Cup for the fourth time after a pulsating 7-4 final victory against East Cowes Vics.

After a sustained spell of consolidation in Division 2, the seventies saw their fortunes gradually decline. Two relegation's saw them drop to Division 4 and due to the high cost of travelling, they left the competition in 1979.

Sandown have since become mainstays of the Isle of Wight League, with the first team frequently alternating between the top two divisions.

In April 2021 they merged with the local youth club, Sandown & Lake (founded in 1973) - becoming their adults section and amending their name accordingly.. Promotion back to Division 1 was achieved in 2026.

== Honours ==
- Hampshire League
  - Division 2 Champions 1956/57, Runners-up 1958/59
  - Division 3 East Champions 1950/51 and 1954/55
  - East Division Runners-up 1925/26
- Hampshire Football Association
  - Intermediate Cup Winners 1923/24
  - Junior Cup Finalists 1909/10
- Isle of Wight League
  - Division 1 Champions
  - Division 2 Champions 2016/17, Runners -up 2025/26
  - Combination Division 2 Champions 2011/12, Runners-up 2014/15 and 2016/17 (Reserves)
- Isle of Wight Football Association
  - Gold Cup Winners 1922/23, 1923/24, 1937/38 and 1958/59
  - Challenge Cup Winners 1926/27, 1928/29, 1929/30, 1936/37, 1937/38, 1938/39, 1945/46 and 1946/47. Finalists 1898/99
  - Memorial Cup Winners 1926/27, 1928/29, 1929/30, 1934/35, 1936/37, 1937/38, 1938/39, 1945/46 and 1946/47
  - Junior 'A' Cup Winners 1987/88 and 2010/11

== Playing records ==
=== League ===
| Season | Division | Position | Significant events |
|---|---|---|---|
| 1898/99 | Southern League Division 2 South & West Section | 4/6 | Left competition |
| | Hampshire League | 5/8 | |
| 1899/1900 | Hampshire League | 8/8 | Left competition |
| 1900-03 | Isle of Wight League | | |
| 1903/04 | Hampshire League South Division | 6/9 | |
| 1904/05 | Hampshire League South Division | 8/9 | |
| 1905/06 | Hampshire League South Division | 8/8 | |
| 1906/07 | Hampshire League South Division | 8/8 | |
| 1907/08 | Hampshire League South Division | 9/9 | |
| 1908/09 | Hampshire League South Division | 8/8 | |
| 1909/10 | Hampshire League South Division | 10/10 | Left competition |
| 1910-23 | Isle of Wight League | | |
| 1923/24 | Hampshire League East Division | 3/8 | |
| 1924/25 | Hampshire League East Division | 3/9 | |
| 1925/26 | Hampshire League East Division | 2/5 | |
| 1926/27 | Hampshire League East Division | 3/8 | |
| 1927/28 | Hampshire League South Division | 12/13 | |
| 1928/29 | Hampshire League Division 2 | 4/14 | Promoted |
| 1929/30 | Hampshire League Division 1 | 9/14 | Left competition |
| 1930-49 | Isle of Wight League | | |
| 1949/50 | Hampshire League Division 3 East | 10/14 | |
| 1950/51 | Hampshire League Division 3 East | 1/14 | Promoted |
| 1951/52 | Hampshire League Division 2 | 3/14 | |
| 1952/53 | Hampshire League Division 2 | 5/14 | |
| 1953/54 | Hampshire League Division 2 | 13/14 | Relegated |
| 1954/55 | Hampshire League Division 3 East | 1/14 | Promoted |
| 1955/56 | Hampshire League Division 2 | 3/16 | |
| 1956/57 | Hampshire League Division 2 | 1/16 | Promoted |
| 1957/58 | Hampshire League Division 1 | 16/16 | Relegated |
| 1958/59 | Hampshire League Division 2 | 2/14 | Promoted |
| 1959/60 | Hampshire League Division 1 | 13/14 | Relegated |
| 1960/61 | Hampshire League Division 2 | 8/16 | |
| 1961/62 | Hampshire League Division 2 | 6/16 | |
| 1962/63 | Hampshire League Division 2 | 13/16 | |
| 1963/64 | Hampshire League Division 2 | 14/16 | |
| 1964/65 | Hampshire League Division 2 | 7/16 | |
| 1965/66 | Hampshire League Division 2 | 5/16 | |
| 1966/67 | Hampshire League Division 2 | 4/16 | |
| 1967/68 | Hampshire League Division 2 | 3/16 | |
| 1968/69 | Hampshire League Division 2 | 7/16 | |
| 1969/70 | Hampshire League Division 2 | 16/16 | Relegated |
| 1970/71 | Hampshire League Division 3 East | 10/14 | |
| 1971/72 | Hampshire League Division 3 | 16/16 | Relegated |
| 1972/73 | Hampshire League Division 4 | 12/16 | |
| 1973/74 | Hampshire League Division 4 | 15/16 | |
| 1974/75 | Hampshire League Division 4 | 10/16 | |
| 1975/76 | Hampshire League Division 4 | 7/16 | |
| 1976/77 | Hampshire League Division 4 | 8/14 | |
| 1977/78 | Hampshire League Division 4 | 8/16 | |
| 1978/79 | Hampshire League Division 4 | 13/13 | Left competition |
| 1979- | Isle of Wight League | | |

=== FA Cup ===
| Season | Round | Opponents | Result |
|---|---|---|---|
| 1926/27 | Preliminary Round | H v Gosport Albion | W 7–4 |
| | 1st Qualifying Round | H v Portland United | L 1-4 |
| 1927/28 | Preliminary Round | H v Royal Marines Portsmouth | L 0–14 |
| 1938/39 | Extra-Preliminary Round | H v Portsmouth Electricity | L 0–2 |
| 1945/46 | 1st Qualifying Round | A v East Cowes Victoria | L 1–9 |
| 1946/47 | Preliminary Round | H v Newport | D 3–3 |
| | Replay | A v Newport | L 2-3 |
| 1947/48 | Preliminary Round | H v Ryde Sports | D 2-2 |
| | Replay | A v Ryde Sports | L 1-4 |
| 1948/49 | Extra-Preliminary Round | A v East Cowes Victoria | L 1-6 |
| 1949/50 | Extra-Preliminary Round | A v Thornycroft Athletic | L 0-5 |

=== FA Amateur Cup ===
| Season | Round | Opponents | Result |
|---|---|---|---|
| 1926/27 | 1st Qualifying Round | H v HMS Excellent | L 1–3 |
| 1946/47 | Preliminary Round | H v Bitterne Nomads | L 2-4 |
| 1947/48 | Preliminary Round | H v Fareham Town | L 0-4 |

== Ground ==
Sandown mens team now play at Sandown Bay Academy, The Fairway, Sandown, PO36 9JH.

Their traditional home at Fairway Park remains in use and is now used by the youth section, although minus the original pavilion and large wooden stand.

The record attendance was in 1976 when 750 turned up to watch a friendly match against Portsmouth.

== Local rivals ==
Sandown had a long running rivalry with Shanklin, Ventnor and most notably Ryde Sports and Brading Town - both with whom Hampshire League meetings always generated much interest and attracted large crowds.
