= St George's Park (Newport) =

Association football stadium on the Isle of Wight, England

Coordinates: 50°41′39.22″N 1°17′10.98″W

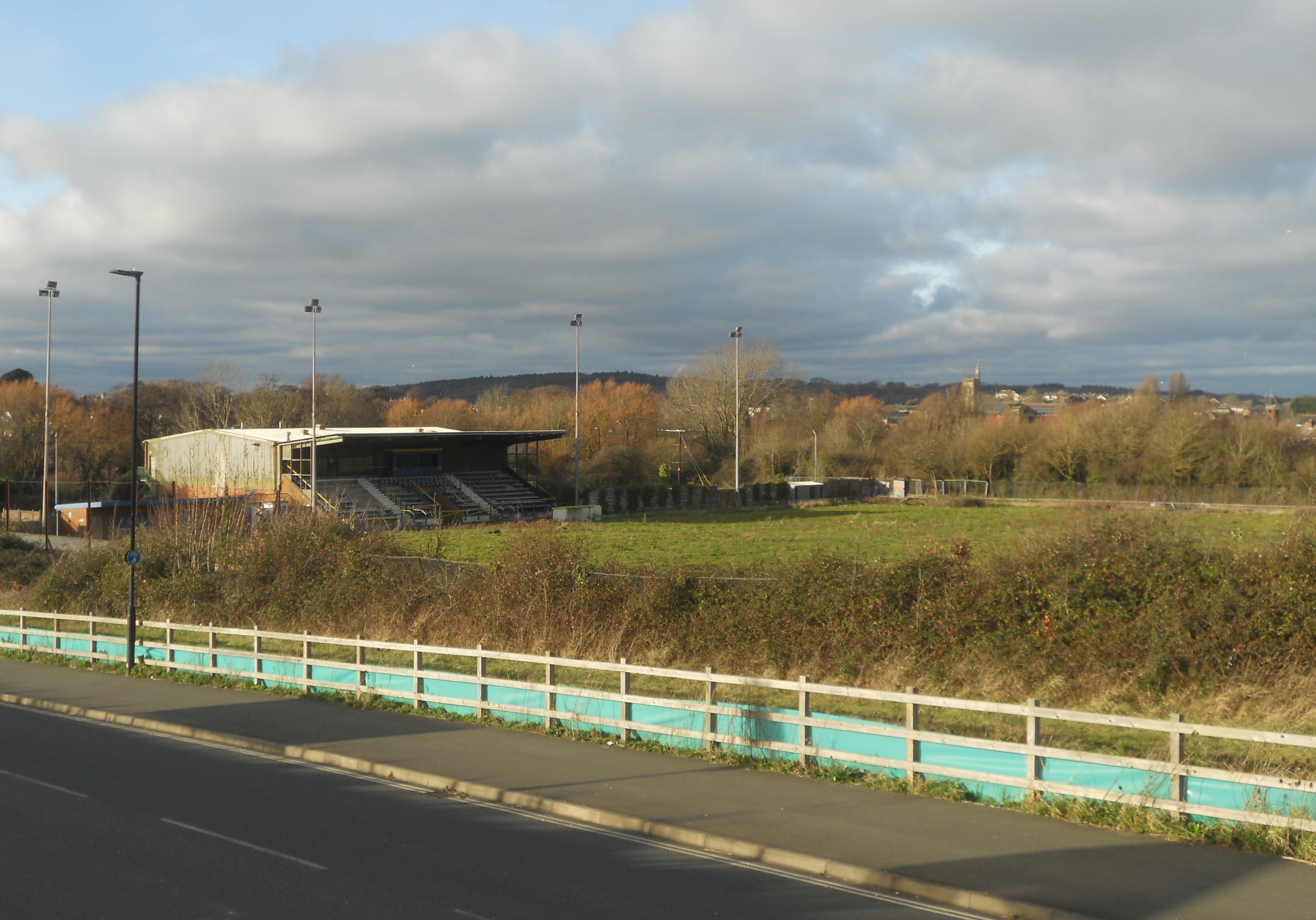
- St George's Park in a derelict state in 2023
- Interactive map of St George's Park
- Location: St Georges Way, Newport
- Capacity: 3,200 (300 seated)
- Record attendance: 3,112 (Newport (IOW) v Portsmouth, 2008)

Construction
- Opened: 1988
- Closed: 2018
- Demolished: 2024

Tenants
- Newport (IOW); Isle of Wight national team

St George's Park was an association football ground in Newport on the Isle of Wight. It was home to Newport (IOW) F.C. and the Isle of Wight official football team, which represents the Isle of Wight at the bi-annual island games. The ground opened in 1988.

The record attendance at the stadium was 3,112 in a pre-season friendly match against Portsmouth F.C. in 2007.

Newport FC were forced to leave St George's Park in 2018 because of plans to build a retail park on the site, and the club began ground-sharing with other Isle of Wight teams. The club eventually relocated to a new purpose-built sports stadium 'Wightfibre Park' in September 2026,

In 2024, St George's Park was demolished, and works on the new retail development on the site commenced early in 2025.

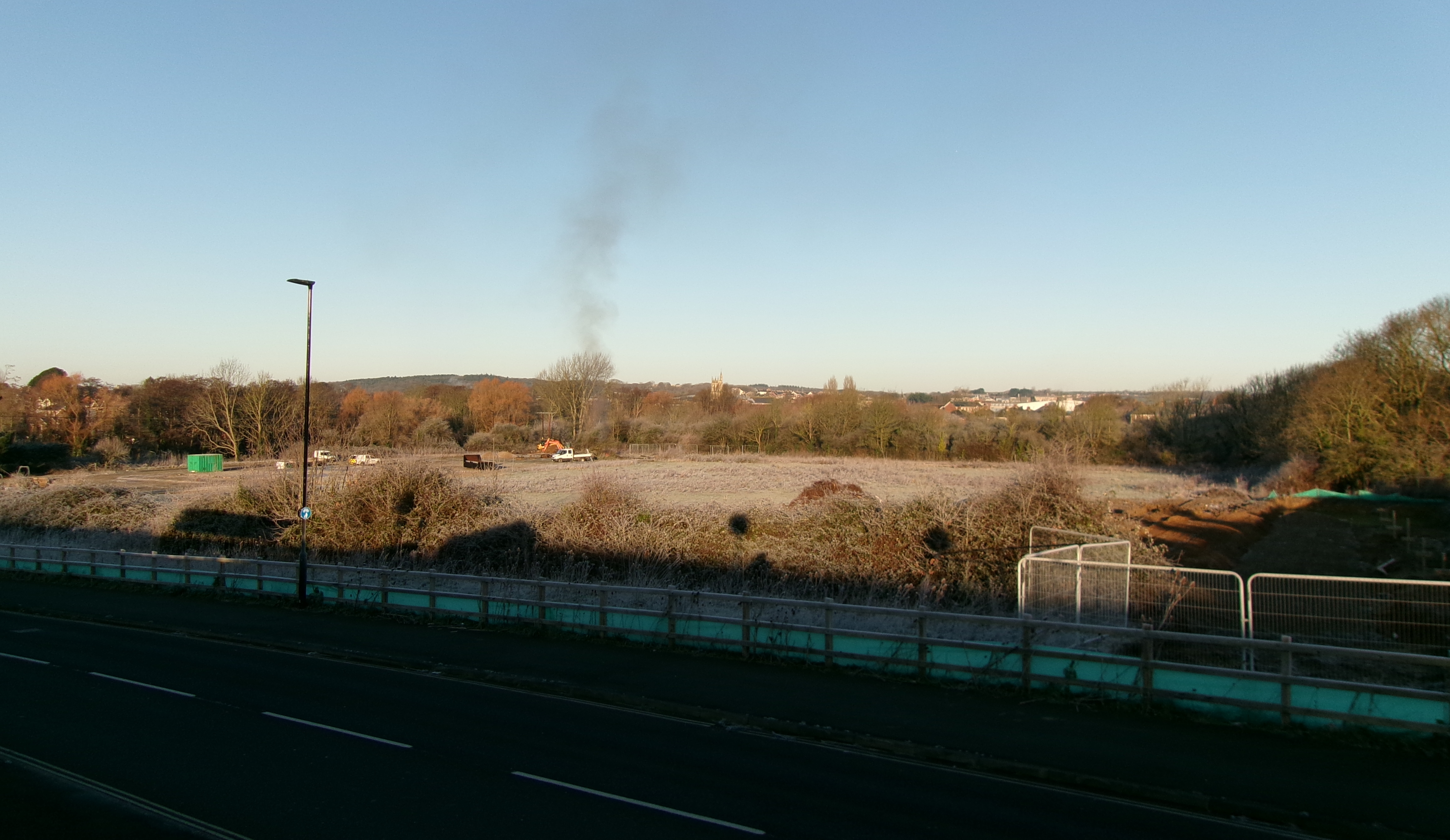
The cleared site in January 2025.
