= Isle of Wight Saturday League =

Football competition based on the Isle of Wight, England

- Founded: 1898
- Country: England
- Divisions: Division One; Division Two
- Current champions: Whitecroft & Barton Sports (Division One); High Park (Division Two) (2024–25)
- Website: https://www.iowdfa.org.uk/

The Isle of Wight Saturday League, known as the Harwoods-Renault Isle of Wight Saturday League for sponsorship reasons, is a football competition based on the Isle of Wight, England.

The competition is affiliated to the Hampshire Football Association and there are currently two main divisions for first teams and two combination divisions for reserve teams. The league champions may be eligible for promotion to the Hampshire Premier League.

== Member clubs 2025–26 ==
Division One

- Bembridge & Vectis
- Brading Town
- Cowes Sports Reserves
- High Park
- Northwood St. John's
- Oakfield
- Osborne Coburg
- Shanklin
- Ventnor
- West Wight
- Whitecroft & Barton Sports

Division Two

- Binstead & County Old Boys
- East Cowes Sports
- East Cowes Vics Reserves
- Newchurch
- Newport IOW Reserves
- Niton
- Pan Community
- Ryde Saints
- Sandown & Lake
- Seaview

== Past and present clubs ==
- See Football Clubs on the Isle of Wight

== Print ==
- Keep It on the Island - A History of Football on the Isle of Wight 1898-1998 by Mick Bull
