= Smallbrook Stadium =

Stadium in Isle of Wight, England

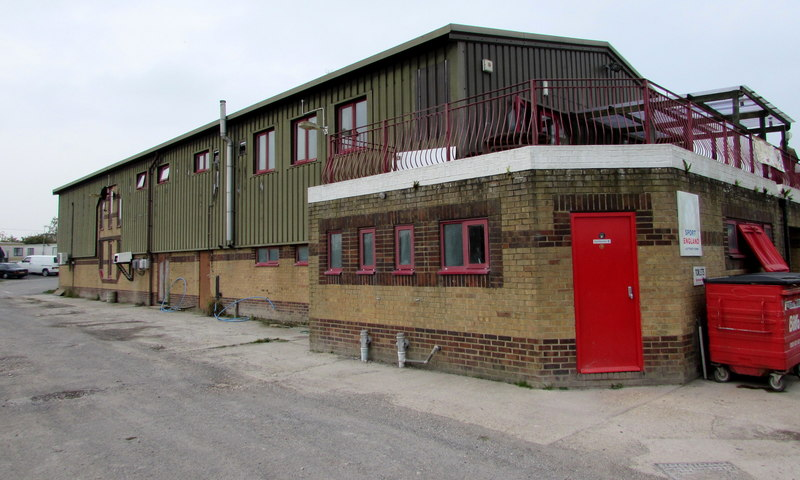
- Location: Ashey Road; Ryde; Isle of Wight PO33 4BH
- Coordinates: 50°42′38″N 1°09′52″W
- Opened: c.1990

Smallbrook Stadium is a multi-use sports venue on the east side of the Ashey Road, south of Ryde. It currently hosts two football teams and motorcycle speedway run by Island Speedway (Iow) Limited.

== Football ==
The ground hosts Ryde Saints, who play in the Isle of Wight leagues. Newport (IOW) F.C. who play in the Wessex Football League played at the stadium from 2022 until 2023 and the defunct Ryde Sports F.C. also played at the stadium.

== Speedway ==
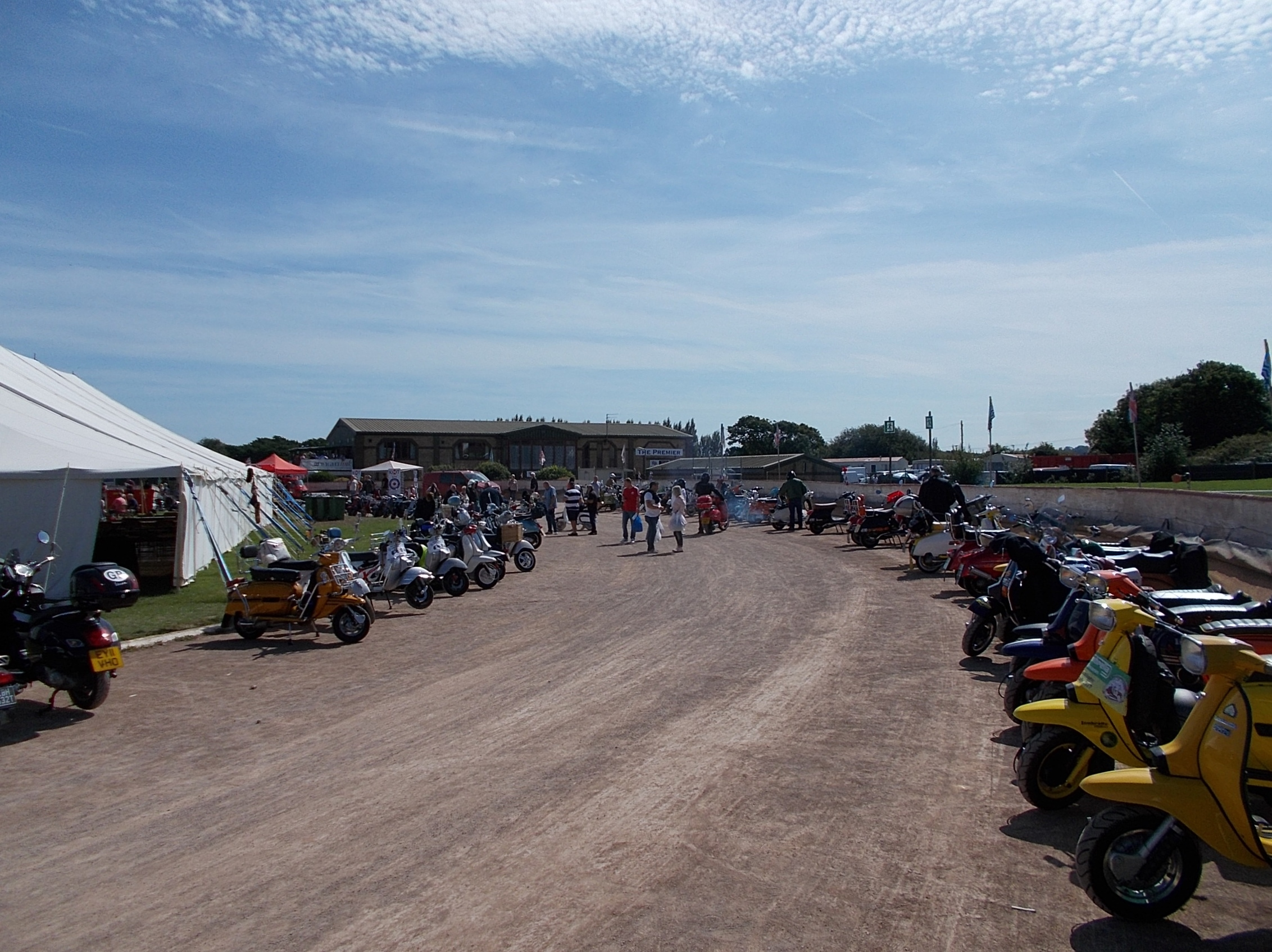
A Scooter rally on the speedway track during 2017.

The venue was the home of the Isle of Wight Warriors, who competed in the British speedway leagues from 2009 until 2019. In 2021, the club announced they would not be competing during the 2021 season but various speedway challenge matches still take place at the stadium.

== History ==
The stadium is named after the existing Smallbrook Heath. In 1990, Ryde Sports F.C. moved into the newly built stadium and they were elected to the Wessex League that year.

In 1996, a 396 metres speedway track was built around the football pitch and the a team called Ryde Wight Wizards competed in the newly formed Conference League, under the co-promotion of Gareth Rogers.

In January 2022, the stadium flooded due to a burst water main.

== See also ==
- Isle of Wight Warriors
- Newport (IOW) F.C.
