= Isle of Wight Senior Cup =

Isle of Wight Senior Gold Cup
- Organiser(s): Isle of Wight FA
- Founded: 1906; 120 years ago
- Region: Isle of Wight
- Current champions: Newport (46th title)
- Most championships: Newport (46 titles)
- Website: Isle of Wight FA

The Senior Gold Cup is the current county cup for the Isle of Wight. It is administered by the Isle of Wight Divisional Football Association (IOWDFA). According to the current rules of the competition, it is open to only island clubs and, where applicable, their reserve teams. The current holders are Cowes Sports F.C. who play in the Wessex Premier.

== History ==
The Senior Gold Cup was first contested in 1945. The most successful club in the competition's history is Newport who have won the cup on 41 occasions.

== Finals ==
This section lists every final (with some exceptions) of the competition played since 1906–07, the winners, the runners-up, and the result.

=== Key ===
Match went to extra time
Match decided by a penalty shootout after extra time
Shared trophy

Season	Winners	Result	Runner-up	Notes
1906–07	Cowes			
1907–08	Cowes			
1908–09				
1909–10	Cowes			
1910–11				
1911–12				
1912–13				
1913–14				
1914–15				
1915–16				
1916–17				
1917–18				
1918–19				
1919–20	Cowes			
1920–21	Royal Ulster			
1921–22	Cowes			
1922–23	Sandown & Lake			
1923–24	Sandown & Lake			
1924–25	Sandown			
1925–26	Cowes			
1926–27	Ryde Sports			
1927–28	Cowes			
1928–29	Newport		Ryde Sports	
1929–30	Cowes Sports			
1930–31	Bembridge			
1931–32	Final withheld. Newport 1–1 Cowes			
1932–33	2nd Hampshire			
1933–34	Cowes			
1934–35	Newport			
1935–36	Cowes			
1936–37	Newport			
1937–38	Sandown			
1938–39	Newport			
1939–40	SLWP			
1940–41	6th Ox & Bucks			
1941–42	12th Devonshire Regiment			
1942–43	Cowes			
1943–44	Newport			
1944–45	Newport			
1945–46	Newport			
1946–47	Newport			
1947–48	Ryde Sports			
1948–49	Ryde Sports			
1949–50	Ryde Sports			
1950–51	Cowes			
1951–52	Cowes		Ryde Sports	
1952–53	Newport; Cowes Sports	–		Trophy shared.
1953–54	Newport			
1954–55	Cowes Sports; Newport	–		Trophy shared.
1955–56	Newport reserves			
1956–57	Ryde Sports			
1957–58	Newport		Ryde Sports	
1958–59	Sandown	7–4	East Cowes Victoria Athletic	
1959–60	Cowes			
1960–61	Cowes			
1961–62	East Cowes Victoria Athletic			
1962–63	Ryde Sports			
1963–64	Ryde Sports			
1964–65	Cowes		Ryde Sports	
1965–66	Newport			
1966–67	Brading Town			
1967–68	Newport			
1968–69	Seaview			
1969–70	Brading Town			
1970–71	Newport			
1971–72	Newport			
1972–73	Newport			
1973–74	Newport			
1974–75	Newport			
1975–76	Newport			
1976–77	Brading Town	4–2	East Cowes Victoria Athletic	
1977–78	Newport			
1978–79	Newport			
1979–80	East Cowes Victoria Athletic			
1980–81	Newport			
1981–82	East Cowes Victoria Athletic			
1982–83	East Cowes Victoria Athletic			
1983–84	East Cowes Victoria Athletic			
1984–85	East Cowes Victoria Athletic			
1985–86	East Cowes Victoria Athletic			
1986–87	Newport			
1987–88	Newport			
1988–89	East Cowes Victoria Athletic			
1989–90	Newport			
1990–91	Ryde Sports			
1991–92	Newport			
1992–93	Newport			
1993–94	Newport			
1994–95	Cowes Sports	3–2	Binstead	
1995–96	Newport			
1996–97	Newport			
1997–98	Newport			
1998–99	Newport			
1999–2000	Newport			
2000–01	Oakfield	1–0	East Cowes Victoria Athletic	
2001–02	Cowes Sports	2–1	Newport	
2002–03	Newport	2–0	Cowes Sports	
2003–04	Newport	5–1	West Wight	
2004–05	Newport	4–0	Brading Town	
2005–06	Brading Town	3–2	East Cowes Victoria Athletic	
2006–07	Cowes Sports	2–1	Newport	
2007–08	Cowes Sports	2–1	East Cowes Victoria Athletic	
2008–09	Newport	2–1	West Wight	
2009–10	Brading Town	2–1	Newport	After extra-time.
2010–11	Newport	3–1	Brading Town	
2011–12	Cowes Sports	1–1	East Cowes Victoria Athletic	Won 4–3 on penalties. After extra-time.
2012–13	Newport	1–0	East Cowes Victoria Athletic	
2013–14	Newport	1–0	Cowes Sports	
2014–15	Newport	4–0	Cowes Sports	
2015–16	Newport	1–1	Cowes Sports	Won 3–1 on penalties. After extra-time.
2016–17	Newport	1–1	Cowes Sports	Won 5–3 on penalties. After extra-time.
2017–18	Cowes Sports	4–1	West Wight	
2018–19	Newport	6–1	W&B Sports	
2019–20	Competition abandoned due to COVID-19 pandemic.			
2020–21	No competition due to COVID-19 pandemic.			
2021–22	Newport	4–1	Cowes Sports	
2022–23	Cowes Sports	1–1	Newport	Won 4–3 on penalties. After extra-time.
2023–24	Cowes Sports	1–1	Newport	Won 6–5 on penalties. After extra-time.
2024–25	Cowes Sports	2–1	East Cowes Victoria Athletic	
2024–25	Newport (IOW)	3–1	Cowes Sports	
