= Penk (surname) =

Penk is a surname. Notable people with the surname include:

- Chris Penk (born 1979), New Zealand politician
- Harry Penk (1934–2020), English footballer
- Steve Penk (born 1961 or 1962), British radio and television presenter
