= Harry Penk =

English footballer (1934–2020)

Personal information
- Full name: Henry Penk
- Date of birth: 19 July 1934
- Place of birth: Wigan, England
- Date of death: 22 June 2020 (aged 85)
- Height: 5 ft 4 in (1.63 m)
- Position: Winger

Senior career*
Years	Team	Apps	(Gls)
1953–1955	Wigan Athletic	55	(6)
1955–1957	Portsmouth	9	(2)
1957–1960	Plymouth Argyle	104	(14)
1960–1964	Southampton	52	(6)
1964–65	Salisbury City		(9)
Total		165	(22)
- * Club domestic league appearances and goals

Henry Penk (19 July 1934 – 22 June 2020) was an English footballer who played as a winger.

== Career ==
Having grown up during the Second World War, he began his career in non-league football with Wigan Athletic, making 55 appearances in the Lancashire Combination before joining Portsmouth in September 1955 for a fee of £2,500. Despite limited first team opportunities, Penk scored two goals in nine league appearances before joining Plymouth Argyle in 1957. He was a key player in the Argyle side that were crowned champions of the re-unified Third Division in 1959, scoring nine goals in 37 league games. He was allowed to join Southampton in the summer of 1960, and spent four years there (making 60 first team appearances and scoring 7 goals) before moving to Salisbury. and Cowes. He also played local league cricket for Hursley Park Cricket Club. He lived in Hampshire.

== Death ==
Penk died at the age 85 on 20 June 2020.
