= Cowes Sports F.C. =

Association football club in England

- Full name: Cowes Sports Football Club
- Nickname: The Yachtsmen
- Founded: 1881
- Ground: Westwood Park, Cowes
- Capacity: 2,000 (500 seated)
- Chairman: Ian Potts
- Manager: Mark Woodhouse
- League: Wessex League Premier Division
- 2025–26: Wessex League Premier Division, 13th of 20
Home colours

Cowes Sports Football Club is a football club based in Cowes, Isle of Wight, England. They play in the Wessex League Premier Division. The club is affiliated to the Isle of Wight Football Association, which is a division of the Hampshire Football Association.

== History ==
Cowes Football Club was formed in 1881 and played in friendlies until 1886, when they entered the Hants and Dorset Junior Cup. In 1896 they became founder members of the Hampshire League becoming its first ever champions and completing the double by winning the Hampshire Senior Cup. The club joined the Southern Football League Division Two (South West Section) in 1898, winning that division at their first attempt. They finished as runners-up in the overall Division two play-off to Thames Ironworks. They were promoted to Division One after a test match against Royal Artillery Portsmouth, but folded the following season due to financial problems and resigned from the Southern League on 18 December 1899.

The club was reformed in 1903, and joined the Hampshire League Division One. The club entered the FA Cup many times during its time in the Hampshire League, reaching the Fourth Qualifying Round in 1957–58 and 1963–64. Cowes were relegated to Division Two in 1967, and won the league in 1975. The club was still a Division Two side by the 1980s when the club merged with Whites Sports to form Cowes Sports.

The club was promoted to Division One in 1988–89 after finishing third, and after winning Division One in 1993–94, Cowes Sports were promoted to the Wessex League. The club reached the Fifth Round of the FA Vase in 1999–2000. They were placed in the Wessex League Division One upon reorganisation in 2005, and the league was renamed the Premier Division the following season. Cowes Sports were relegated to Division One in 2010. In the 2014–15 season Cowes Sports gained promotion back to the Premier Division by finishing in second place behind winners Team Solent.

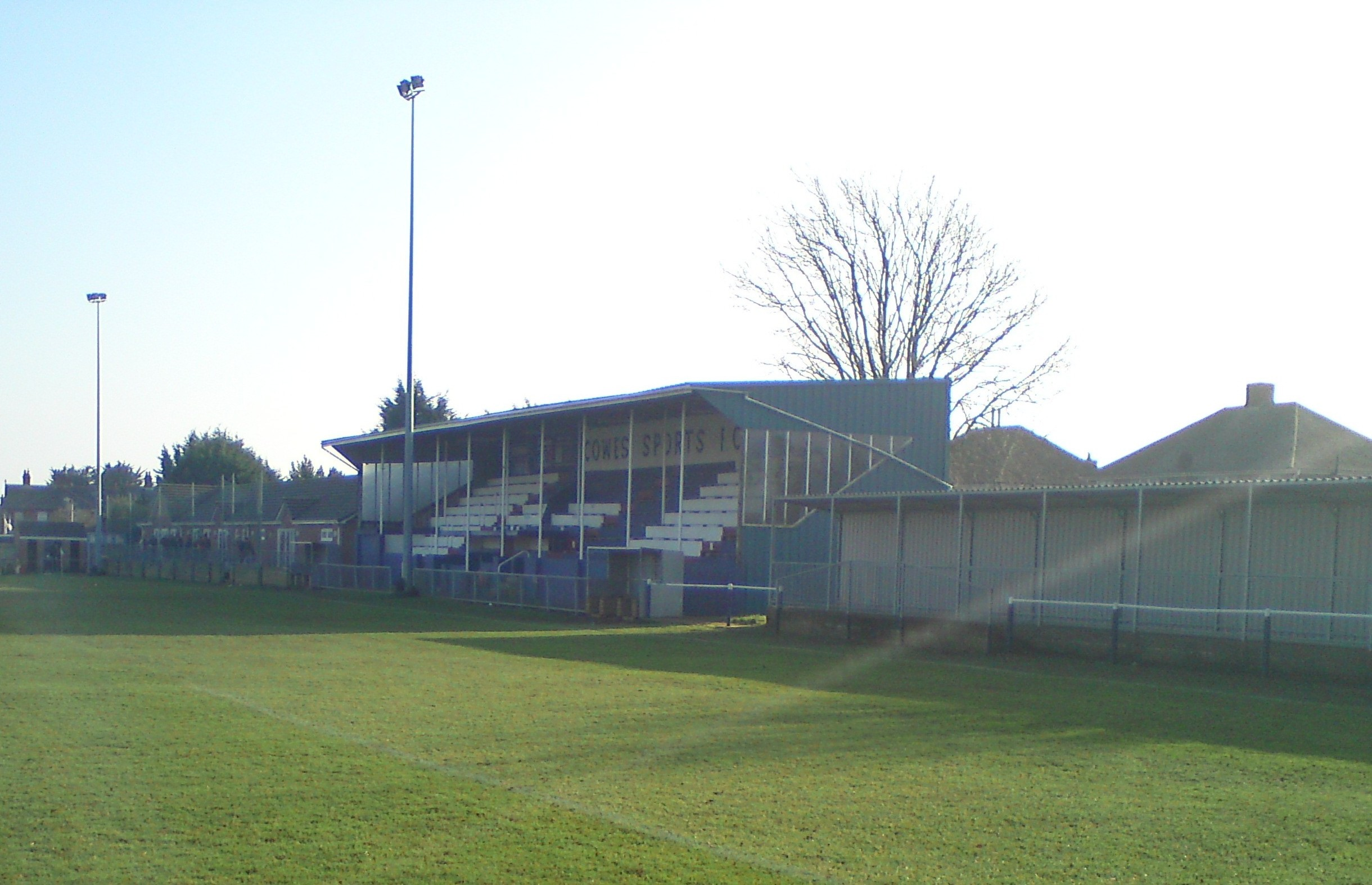
Westwood park, home of Cowes Sports

== Ground ==
Cowes Sports play their games at Diverse Marine Stadium (Formally Westwood Park) in Cowes.

The club moved to the ground in September 1912 after their old Brooklyn ground was sold for housing. The club purchased the ground in 1945 for a total amount of £665.

== Honours ==
=== League honours ===
- Southern Football League Division Two South West Section
  - Champions (1): 1898–99
- Hampshire League Division One
  - Champions (7): 1896–97, 1926–27, 1927–28, 1930–31, 1936–37, 1955–56, 1993–94
- Hampshire League Division Two
  - Champions (1): 1974–75

=== Cup honours ===
- Hampshire Senior Cup:
  - Winners (9): 1896–97, 1905–06, 1911–12, 1925–26, 1929–30, 1933–34, 1945–46, 1947–48, 1966–67
- Wessex Football League:
  - Winners (1): 1998–99
- Hampshire League Cup:
  - Winners (1): 1992–93
- Isle of Wight Senior Cup:
  - Winners (24): 1906–07, 1907–08, 1909–10, 1920–21, 1922–23, 1926–27, 1930–31, 1934–35, 1936–37, 1942–43, 1949–50, 1950–51, 1951–52, 1952–53, 1964–65, 1994–95, 2001–02, 2006–07, 2007–08, 2011–12, 2017–18, 2022–23, 2023–24, 2024–25

== Records ==
- Highest League Position: 1st in Southern Football League Division Two South West Section 1898–99
- FA Cup best performance: Fourth Qualifying Round 1957–58, 1963–64
- FA Trophy best performance: Second Qualifying Round 1970–71
- FA Vase best performance: Fifth Round 1999–2000

== Former players ==
Former player Marc Burrows scored the sport's fastest ever goal whilst at the club, In a record time of 2.5 seconds, beating the previous record set by Ricardo Oliveira, in a reserve team match against Eastleigh in 2004.

A list of other former Players who meet the following criteria

1. Players that have played/managed in the football league or any foreign equivalent to this level (i.e. fully professional league).
2. Players with full international caps.
- (England) Billy Bevis
- (England) Joe Blake
- (England) Lee Bradbury
- (England) Arthur Bradford
- (England) Arthur Brown
- (England) Len Butt
- (England) Lewis Buxton
- (England) Percy Cherrett
- (England) John Flood
- (Wales) David Hamer
- (England) Danny Hatcher
- (England) James Hayter
- (England) Bill Luckett
- (Jamaica) Jamie Lawrence
- (England) Charlie Leatherbarrow
- (Scotland) Duncan McLean
- (England) Pat Parker
- (England) Harry Penk
- (England) George Reader
- (England) Albie Roles
- (Scotland) David Skea
- (England) Lachie Thomson

== Former coaches ==
1. Managers/Coaches that have played/managed in the football league or any foreign equivalent to this level (i.e. fully professional league).
2. Managers/Coaches with full international caps.
- (England) Jack Gregory
- (England) Albie Roles
- (England) Steve Hunt
