= Newport (IOW) F.C. =

Association football club in England

Coordinates: 50.745°N 1.277°W

Newport (Isle of Wight)
- Full name: Newport (Isle of Wight) Football Club
- Nickname: The Port
- Founded: 1888
- Ground: WightFibre Park
- Capacity: 1,300 (150 seated)
- Chairman: John Davies (club), Steve Rackett (Newport IW Community FC - owners).
- Manager: Joe Butcher
- League: Wessex League Division One
- 2025–26: Wessex League Division One, 7th of 22
- Website: https://www.newportiwfc.com
Home colours	Away colours

Newport (Isle of Wight) Football Club is a semi-pro football club based in Newport on the Isle of Wight, England. They are currently members of the Wessex League Division One and are based at WightFibre Park on the outskirts of Newport.

The club is owned by a supporters' organisation, Newport (IW) Community FC.

== History ==
The club was established on 27 January 1888, and were founder members of the Isle of Wight League in 1898. They won the Isle of Wight Challenge Cup in 1904–05, and again in 1907–08, when they were also league champions. The club went on to retain the league title for the next two years. After winning the league again in 1923–24, they moved up to the East Section of the Hampshire League. They won the Isle of Wight Memorial Cup in 1925–26, before being moved into the County Section of the Hampshire League in 1927 and then the South Division the following year as the league was restructured. They won the Isle of Wight Challenge Cup again in 1928–29.

In 1929 Newport were placed in Division One of the league and went on to win the league title in the 1929–30 season, also winning the Isle of Wight Senior Cup. They were Division One runners-up the following season and again in 1931–32, a season in which the club also won the Hampshire Senior Cup for the first time. They went on to win the Division One title for a second time in 1932–33. The 1935–36 season saw them finish as runners-up in the division, as well as reaching the first round of the FA Cup for the first time; after beating Yeovil & Petters United 1–0 in the first round, they lost 8–0 at Southall in the second. The club went on to win a third league title in 1938–39. During World War II the club returned to the Isle of Wight League, returning to the Hampshire League after the war. In the 1945–46 FA Cup they defeated Leyton Orient 3–1 on aggregate in the first round (to date, their only FA Cup win over a League club) before losing 12–0 to Aldershot in the second round. The club were Hampshire League champions in 1949–50, starting a decade of sustained success for the club.

After finishing as runners-up in Division One in 1951–52, Newport were Hampshire League champions in 1952–53, a season which saw another first round appearance in the FA Cup, losing 5–0 at Swindon Town. They retained the league title the following season and also faced Swindon in the FA Cup first round again, this time losing 2–1. In 1954–55 they were Hampshire League runners-up and lost 4–3 at Hinckley Athletic in the first round of the FA Cup. The 1956–57 season saw the club crowned champions for a fifth time in ten years, with another FA Cup first round appearance resulting in a 6–0 defeat at home to Watford. Further appearances in the FA Cup first round in 1957–58 and 1958–59 ending with defeats to Hereford United and Shrewsbury Town. Although the club were Division One runners-up in 1958–59, the following season saw them finish in the bottom three of the division. In 1968–69 they finished bottom of Division One and were relegated to Division Two.

Newport were Division Two runners-up in 1970–71, earning promotion back to Division One. They were Division One runners-up in 1977–78 and won the league title the following season. The club went on to retain the league title for the next two seasons. In 1986 they were founder members of the Wessex League. After finishing as runners-up in 1989–90, they moved up to the Southern Division of the Southern League. In 1994–95 the club reached the FA Cup first round for the first time since the 1950s, losing 3–2 at home to Aylesbury United. The following season saw them reach the first round again, before losing 2–1 to Enfield in a replay. The club were transferred to the Eastern Division in 1999 and were Eastern Division champions in 2000–01, earning promotion to the Premier Division. However, they were relegated back to the Eastern Division after only a single season.

In 2004 Newport were transferred to Division One of the Isthmian League, where they played for two seasons before being moved into Division One South & West of the Southern League. The 2007–08 season saw them finish bottom of Division One South & West, resulting in relegation back to the Premier Division of the Wessex League.

== Ground ==
The club initially played at Well's Field, which was later renamed Church Litten before moving to St Georges Park.

Newport played at Smallbrook Stadium from 2022 to 2023, after agreeing a two-year deal with Ryde Saints and the Isle of Wight Warriors. They ground shared at Westwood Park, home of Cowes Sports FC during the 2025/26 season.

Newport now play at WightFibre Park which is on The Racecourse on the outskirts of Newport, accessed via vehicle entrance on Whippingham Road. The pedestrian access is on East Cowes Road and the bus stop for the ground is Binfield Corner.

== Honours ==
- Southern League
  - Eastern Division champions (1) 2000–01
- Hampshire League
  - Division One champions (11) 1929–30, 1932–33, 1938–39, 1947–48, 1949–50, 1952–53, 1953–54, 1956–57, 1978–79, 1979–80, 1980–81
- Isle of Wight League
  - Champions (4) 1907–08, 1908–09, 1909–10, 1923–24
- Hampshire Senior Cup
  - Winners (10) 1931–32, 1932–33, 1935–36, 1951–52, 1954–55, 1960–61, 1965–66, 1979–80, 1980–81, 1997–98
- Russell Cotes Cup
  - Winners (4) 1977–78, 1978–79, 1979–80, 2010–11
- Pickford Cup
  - Winners (4) 1947–48, 1948–49, 1949–50, 1952–53
- Isle of Wight Senior Cup
  - Winners (43) 1929–30, 1935–36, 1937–38, 1939–40, 1944–45, 1945–46, 1946–47, 1948–49, 1952–53 (shared with Cowes) 1953–44, 1957–58, 1965–66, 1967–68, 1970–71, 1971–72, 1972–73, 1973–74, 1974–75, 1975–76, 1977–78, 1978–79, 1980–81, 1986–87, 1987–88, 1989–90, 1991–92, 1992–93,1993–94, 1995–96, 1996–97, 1997–98, 1998–99, 1999–2000, 2002–03, 2003–04, 2004–05, 2008–09, 2010–11, 2012–13, 2013–14, 2014–15, 2015–16, 2016–17, 2020–21, 2025–26
- Hampshire Floodlit Cup
  - Winners (2) 1976–77, 1977–78
- Hampshire Intermediate Cup
  - Winners (2) 1931–32, 1996–97
- Hampshire Combination Cup
  - Winners (1) 1938–39
- Isle of Wight Memorial Cup
  - Winners (8) 1925–26, 1940–41, 1941–42, 1942–43, 1944–45, 1976–77, 1980–81, 1981–82
- Isle of Wight Challenge Cup
  - Winners (6) 1904–05, 1907–08, 1928–29, 1953–54, 1985–86, 2000–01
- Isle of Wight Charity Cup
  - Winners (2) 1928–29, 1944–45
- Isle of Wight Jubilee Cup
  - Winners (1) 1973–74

== Records ==
- Best FA Cup performance: Second round, 1935–36, 1945–46
- Best FA Trophy performance: Fourth round, 1999–2000
- Best FA Vase performance: Fifth round, 1991–92, 1992–93, 2012-13
- Record attendance: 2,270 vs Portsmouth, friendly match, 7 July 2001
- Most appearances: Darren Powell, 585 (2006–2024)
- Most goals: Roy Grilfillan, 221 (1951–1957)

== See also ==
- Newport (IOW) F.C. players
- Newport (IOW) F.C. managers
