= Brading Town F.C. =

English football club based in Brading, Isle of Wight

Coordinates: 50°41′04.84″N 1°08′25.27″W

Brading Town
- Full name: Brading Town Football Club
- Nickname: The Romans
- Founded: 1871
- Ground: Peter Henry Ground, Brading
- Chairman: Geoff Ruck
- Manager: Steve Lawton
- League: Isle of Wight League Division One
- 2025–26: Isle of Wight League Division One, 4th of 10
Home colours	Away colours

Brading Town Football Club is an English football club based in Brading, Isle of Wight. They are currently members of the Isle of Wight League Division One and play at the Peter Henry Ground.

== History ==
Established in 1871, the club initially played home matches at Vicarage Field and Beech Grove. They were founder members of the Isle of Wight League in 1898. They won Division Two several times in the 1920s and 1930s, and were promoted to Division One in 1948. During the 1950s they won Division One eight consecutive seasons. In 1958 they purchased the Vicarage Lane ground, later renamed after club stalwart Peter Henry.

In 1973 the club joined Division Four of the Hampshire League. Three successive promotions culminated in the club reaching Division One in 1976 after winning the Division Two title and the Hampshire Intermediate Cup. In 1991–92 they finished second bottom of Division One and were relegated. They returned to the top division as Division Two runners-up in 1996–97.

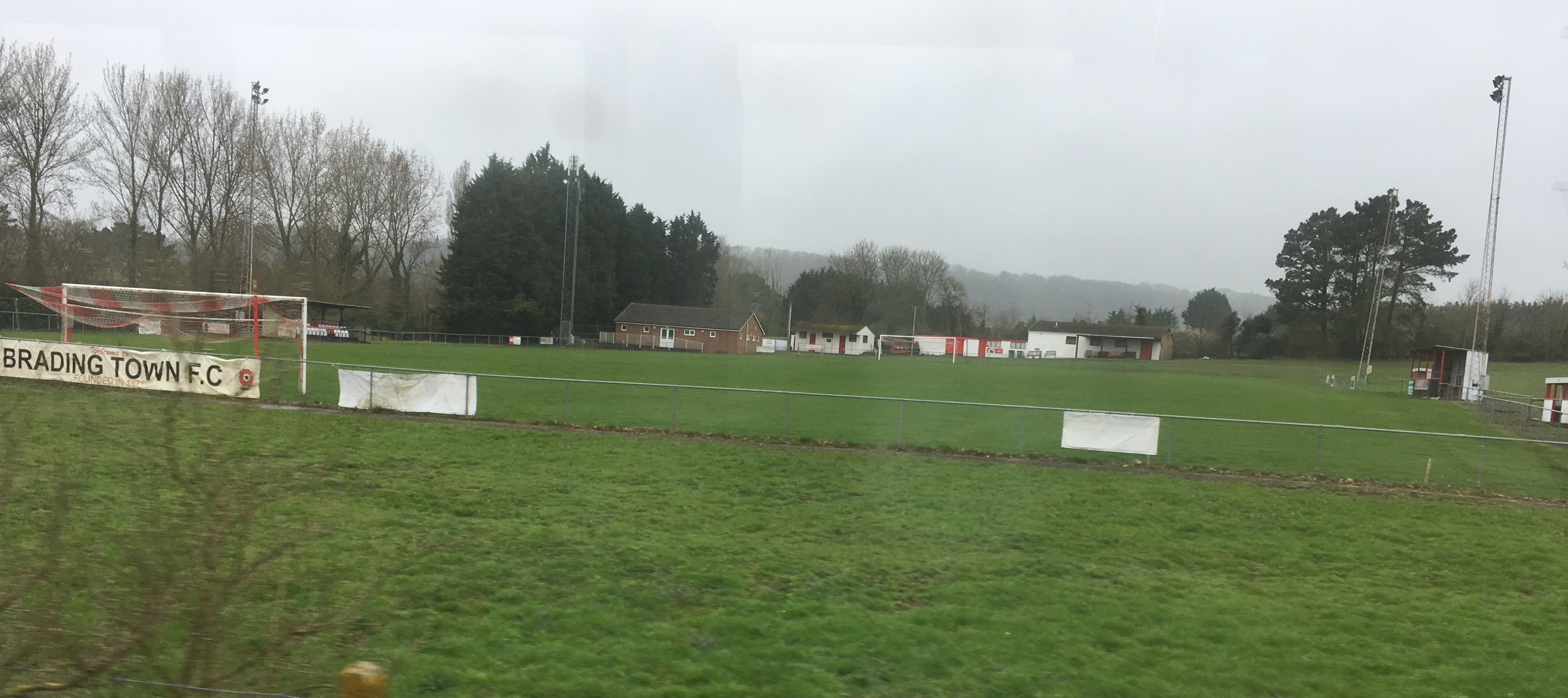
View of the club's ground from a passing Island Line train

Despite finishing bottom of the Premier Division in 2003–04, the club joined the newly established Division Two of the Wessex League in the close season. In 2005–06 they won the Isle of Wight Gold Cup and finished third in the league, earning promotion to the Premier Division. They won the Gold Cup again in 2009–10.

In June 2012 the club announced it was withdrawing from the Wessex League "due to the ever increasing cost of mainland travel and League administration fees, which makes it unviable to continue in the present economic climate.". The club announced it planned to instead concentrate on the Isle of Wight League.

== Honours ==
=== League honours ===
- Hampshire League Division Two:
  - Runners-up (1): 1996–97
- Isle of Wight Saturday League Division One:
  - Runners-up (1): 2013–14

=== Cup honours ===
- Isle of Wight Senior Cup
  - Winners (5): 1966–67, 1969–70, 1976–77, 2005–06, 2009–10
- Hampshire Intermediate Cup
  - Winners (2): 1975–76, 2019–21
- Isle Of Wight Challenge Cup
  - Winners (6): 1948–49, 1954–55, 1963–64, 1968–69, 1969–70, 1971–72
  - Runners-up (1): 2012–13
- Isle Of Wight Memorial Cup
  - Winners (9): 1950–51, 1951–52, 1955–56, 1959–60, 1965–66, 1967–68, 1971–72, 1986–87, 2013–14
- Isle of Wight Jubilee Cup
  - Winners (10): 1948–49, 1950–51, 1951–52, 1953–54, 1954–55, 1955–56, 1965–66, 1967–68, 2011–12, 2013–14
  - Runners-up (1): 2014–15

== Records ==
- FA Cup best performance: First Qualifying Round 2009–10, 2010–11
- FA Vase best performance: Second round 2010–11
