= 1922–23 Southampton F.C. season =

English football club season

Southampton F.C.
1922–23 season
- Chairman: Tankerville Chamberlayne
- Manager: Jimmy McIntyre
- Stadium: The Dell
- Second Division: 11th
- FA Cup: Fourth round
- Top goalscorer: League: Arthur Dominy (13); All: Arthur Dominy (18)
- Highest home attendance: League: 18,000 v South Shields (2 September 1922); Overall: 25,000 v Chelsea (7 February 1923)
- Lowest home attendance: 5,000 v Port Vale (5 March 1923)
- Average home league attendance: 12,261
- Biggest win: 3–0 v Wolverhampton Wanderers (28 October 1922); 3–0 v Coventry City (10 February 1923)
- Biggest defeat: 0–4 v Derby County (9 December 1922)
Home colours

The 1922–23 season was the 28th season of competitive football by Southampton, and the club's first in the Second Division of the Football League. Having secured promotion from the Third Division South as champions the previous season, the largely unchanged Saints team avoided relegation comfortably and finished in the middle of the league table in their first season as a second-flight club. After a poor start to the campaign in which they picked up only one point from their first five matches, Southampton began to improve in form and move up from the Second Division relegation zone. The club picked up several wins over higher-placed opponents challenging for the division's two promotion places, allowing them to finish mid-table. Southampton finished in 11th place with 14 wins, 14 draws and 14 losses, and an even goal average.

In the 1922–23 FA Cup, Southampton beat First Division sides Newcastle United and Chelsea in the first and second rounds, followed by Second Division opponents Bury in the third, all of which went to replays at The Dell. In the fourth round they faced West Ham United, another Second Division side, and were knocked out after a second replay. The club ended the season hosting local rivals Portsmouth in the annual Hampshire Benevolent Cup charity match, which ended in a 2–2 draw with goals from Arthur Dominy and Henry Johnson. They also played Pompey a week previously in the Rowland Hospital Cup, with Johnson and Bill Rawlings scoring in the 2–1 win. Southampton also played three friendly matches during the season, losing to Arsenal in October, Portsmouth in December, and drawing at Northampton Town in May.

Southampton used 22 different players during the 1922–23 season and had nine different goalscorers. Their top scorer was inside-right Arthur Dominy, who scored 13 goals in the Second Division and four in the FA Cup. Centre-forward Bill Rawlings, the club's top scorer for the last two seasons, scored 12 times in the league and twice in the cup. Seven new players were signed by the club during the campaign, with five released and sold to other clubs. The average attendance at The Dell during the 1922–23 season was 12,261. The highest attendance was approximately 25,000 in the FA Cup second round replay against Chelsea on 7 February 1923; the highest league attendance was 18,000 against South Shields on 2 September 1922. The lowest attendance of the season was around 5,000 for the game against Port Vale on 5 March 1923.

== Background and transfers ==
At the end of the 1921–22 season, several players left Southampton. First was centre-half George Bradburn, who had been out of favour for the past two seasons due to the continued form of the preferred Alec Campbell. He left to return to Walsall in the Third Division North. In June, outside-left Ken Boyes also left the club, remaining in the Third Division South with Bristol Rovers. Len Butt left around the same time, joining local Southern League club Boscombe. Centre-forward John Horton, who had managed just one appearance in his first season with the Saints before breaking his leg, was forced to retire from professional football. Prior to the start of the 1922–23 campaign, Southampton manager Jimmy McIntyre brought in two new signings to the club. First was Scottish half-back Alex Christie, who joined from Walsall primarily as cover at right-half behind the ever-present Bert Shelley. Also signed was left winger Joe Clark, who joined from Welsh side Aberdare & Aberaman Athletic.

Shortly after the season had begun, McIntyre signed several more players. In September, the club brought in half-back Arthur Bradford from Talbot Stead Tubeworks, although he would not make his debut for the club until late the following season. The club also signed former goalkeeper Herbert Lock from Queens Park Rangers and Harry Yeomans from Camberley & Yorktown, having been without a backup for Tommy Allen the entire last season. In November, inside-forward Les Bruton was brought in from Foleshill for a fee of £15. Southampton signed and sold one more player in January 1923. Leaving the club was Scottish half-back George Getgood, who had joined less than a year earlier and been a regular in the side ever since. Getgood had continued to commute to the South Coast from Birmingham instead of moving, and so decided to transfer to a club closer to home when he joined Wolverhampton Wanderers. Outside-left Willie McCall moved in the other direction as part of the deal.

Players transferred in

Name	Nationality	Pos.	Club	Date	Fee	Ref.
Alex Christie	Scotland	HB	(England) Walsall	May 1922	Unknown	
Joe Clark	England	FW	(Wales) Aberaman Athletic	May 1922	Unknown	
Arthur Bradford	England	HB	(England) Talbot Stead Tubeworks	September 1922	Unknown	
Herbert Lock	England	GK	(England) Queens Park Rangers	September 1922	Unknown	
Harry Yeomans	England	GK	(England) Camberley & Yorktown	October 1922	Free (Note: Harry Yeomans initially joined on amateur terms in October 1922, before turning professional that December.)	
Les Bruton	England	FW	(England) Foleshill	November 1922	£15	
Willie McCall	Scotland	FW	(England) Wolverhampton Wanderers	January 1923	Exchange	

Players transferred out

Name	Nationality	Pos.	Club	Date	Fee	Ref.
George Bradburn	England	HB	(England) Walsall	May 1922	Unknown	
Ken Boyes	England	FW	(England) Bristol Rovers	June 1922	Unknown	
Len Butt	England	HB	(England) Boscombe	June 1922	Unknown	
George Getgood	Scotland	HB	(England) Wolverhampton Wanderers	January 1923	Exchange	

Players retired

Name	Nationality	Pos.	Date	Reason	Ref.
John Horton	England	FW	May 1922	Retired due to leg injury	

== Second Division ==
Southampton's first season in the Second Division of the Football League started poorly, with the club picking up just two points from their opening six games – in a goalless draw against South Shields on opening day, and in a 2–2 draw with Barnsley a month later – to find themselves in the relegation zone early on. The Saints failed to score in their first five games of the campaign, which marked a club record not equalled until 1937. The first home game of the season, against Leeds United, also marked the end of the team's 18-month unbeaten run at home. Southampton picked up their first win over Blackpool on 23 September, and began to improve their form to move up from the bottom of the league table. After a nine-game unbeaten run, the club had made it up to 11th place by mid-November. Despite being briefly dropped in favour of Henry Johnson early in the season, Bill Rawlings scored many important goals in later months alongside Arthur Dominy to ensure that the Saints remained competitive.

The club continued to remain above the drop zone over the Christmas period, despite dropping a number of points in both home and away fixtures, albeit to teams challenging for the division's promotion places. Their biggest defeat of the season came on 9 December at The Dell, with fellow strugglers Derby County thrashing the home side 4–0. By the new year they had cemented their position in the middle of the table, beating teams in the same vicinity such as Hull City and Fulham in late December to move back up to 11th. Another brief unbeaten run against lower-placed teams in March and April was followed by wins over strugglers Clapton Orient and Stockport County, which ensured that the side survived their first season in the Second Division with relative ease. Southampton finished the season in 11th place, picking up 14 wins, 14 draws and 14 losses. With a goal record of 40 scored and 40 conceded, they finished ahead of Hull City on goal average, and trailed 10th-placed Fulham by two points.

=== List of match results ===
26 August 1922 1	South Shields	0–0	Southampton	South Shields
				Stadium: Horsley Hill; Attendance: 13,000

28 August 1922 2	Southampton	0–1	Leeds United	Southampton
				Stadium: The Dell; Attendance: 16,000

2 September 1922 3	Southampton	0–2	South Shields	Southampton
				Stadium: The Dell; Attendance: 18,000

4 September 1922 4	Leeds United	1–0	Southampton	Leeds
				Stadium: Elland Road; Attendance: 6,000

9 September 1922 5	Barnsley	3–0	Southampton	Barnsley
				Stadium: Oakwell; Attendance: 10,000

16 September 1922 6	Southampton	2–2	Barnsley	Southampton
	Shelley; Rawlings			Stadium: The Dell; Attendance: 15,000

23 September 1922 7	Blackpool	1–2	Southampton	Blackpool
			Dominy; Rawlings	Stadium: Bloomfield Road; Attendance: 14,000

30 September 1922 8	Southampton	1–1	Blackpool	Southampton
	Elkes			Stadium: The Dell; Attendance: 16,000

7 October 1922 9	West Ham United	1–1	Southampton	London
			Elkes	Stadium: Boleyn Ground; Attendance: 20,000

14 October 1922 10	Southampton	2–0	West Ham United	Southampton
	Dominy; Rawlings			Stadium: The Dell; Attendance: 17,000

21 October 1922 11	Wolverhampton Wanderers	0–0	Southampton	Wolverhampton
				Stadium: Molineux Stadium; Attendance: 15,000

28 October 1922 12	Southampton	3–0	Wolverhampton Wanderers	Southampton
	Getgood; Dominy; Rawlings			Stadium: The Dell; Attendance: 13,000

4 November 1922 13	Southampton	2–0	Bradford City	Southampton
	Dominy; Elkes			Stadium: The Dell; Attendance: 14,000

11 November 1922 14	Bradford City	0–0	Southampton	Bradford
				Stadium: Valley Parade; Attendance: 15,000

18 November 1922 15	Leicester City	2–1	Southampton	Leicester
			Dominy	Stadium: Filbert Street; Attendance: 18,000

25 November 1922 16	Southampton	0–0	Leicester City	Southampton
				Stadium: The Dell; Attendance: 17,000

2 December 1922 17	Derby County	0–2	Southampton	Derby
			Dominy; Elkes	Stadium: Baseball Ground; Attendance: 10,000

9 December 1922 18	Southampton	0–4	Derby County	Southampton
				Stadium: The Dell; Attendance: 15,000

16 December 1922 19	Notts County	1–0	Southampton	Nottingham
				Stadium: Meadow Lane; Attendance: 9,000

23 December 1922 20	Southampton	0–1	Notts County	Southampton
				Stadium: The Dell; Attendance: 9,000

25 December 1922 21	Hull City	1–3	Southampton	Kingston upon Hull
			Dominy; Elkes	Stadium: Anlaby Road; Attendance: 14,000

26 December 1922 22	Southampton	2–1	Hull City	Southampton
	Campbell; Own goal			Stadium: The Dell; Attendance: 16,000

30 December 1922 23	Southampton	2–0	Fulham	Southampton
	Dominy; Rawlings			Stadium: The Dell; Attendance: 7,000

1 January 1923 24	The Wednesday	0–0	Southampton	Sheffield
				Stadium: Hillsborough Stadium; Attendance: 30,000

6 January 1923 25	Fulham	1–1	Southampton	London
			Dominy	Stadium: Craven Cottage; Attendance: 25,000

20 January 1923 26	Southampton	0–2	Crystal Palace	Southampton
				Stadium: The Dell; Attendance: 13,000

27 January 1923 27	Crystal Palace	1–0	Southampton	London
				Stadium: The Nest; Attendance: 9,000

10 February 1923 28	Southampton	3–0	Coventry City	Southampton
	Brown; McCall; Own goal			Stadium: The Dell; Attendance: 7,000

17 February 1923 29	Port Vale	0–0	Southampton	Hanley
				Stadium: Old Recreation Ground; Attendance: 14,000

3 March 1923 30	Manchester United	1–2	Southampton	Manchester
			Brown; Rawlings	Stadium: Old Trafford; Attendance: 20,000

5 March 1923 31	Southampton	3–1	Port Vale	Southampton
	Johnson; Rawlings; McCall			Stadium: The Dell; Attendance: 5,000

17 March 1923 32	Southampton	0–3	Bury	Southampton
				Stadium: The Dell; Attendance: 12,000

24 March 1923 33	Bury	0–0	Southampton	Bury
				Stadium: Gigg Lane; Attendance: 9,000

31 March 1923 34	Southampton	4–2	Rotherham County	Southampton
	Rawlings; Dominy			Stadium: The Dell; Attendance: 10,000

2 April 1923 35	Southampton	1–1	The Wednesday	Southampton
	Rawlings			Stadium: The Dell; Attendance: 16,000

7 April 1923 36	Rotherham County	0–0	Southampton	Rotherham
				Stadium: Millmoor; Attendance: 11,000

11 April 1923 37	Southampton	0–0	Manchester United	Southampton
				Stadium: The Dell; Attendance: 5,500

14 April 1923 38	Southampton	2–0	Clapton Orient	Southampton
	Dominy; Rawlings			Stadium: The Dell; Attendance: 9,000

21 April 1923 39	Clapton Orient	1–0	Southampton	London
				Stadium: Clapton Stadium; Attendance: 15,000

28 April 1923 40	Southampton	1–0	Stockport County	Southampton
	Dominy			Stadium: The Dell; Attendance: 7,000

30 April 1923 41	Coventry City	2–0	Southampton	Coventry
				Stadium: Highfield Road; Attendance: 12,000

5 May 1923 42	Stockport County	3–0	Southampton	Stockport
				Stadium: Edgeley Park; Attendance: 15,000

=== Final league table ===
Pos	Team	Pld	W	D	L	GF	GA	GAv	Pts
9	Barnsley	42	17	11	14	62	51	1.216	45
10	Fulham	42	16	12	14	43	32	1.344	44
11	Southampton	42	14	14	14	40	40	1.000	42
12	Hull City	42	14	14	14	43	45	0.956	42
13	South Shields	42	15	10	17	35	44	0.795	40

=== Results by matchday ===
Round	1	2	3	4	5	6	7	8	9	10	11	12	13	14	15	16	17	18	19	20	21	22	23	24	25	26	27	28	29	30	31	32	33	34	35	36	37	38	39	40	41	42
Ground	A	H	H	A	A	H	A	H	A	H	A	H	H	A	A	H	A	H	A	H	A	H	H	A	A	H	A	H	A	A	H	H	A	H	H	A	H	H	A	H	A	A
Result	D	L	L	L	L	D	W	D	D	W	D	W	W	D	L	D	W	L	L	L	W	W	W	D	D	L	L	W	D	W	W	L	D	W	D	D	D	W	L	W	L	L
Position	13	15	20	22	22	21	19	17	18	16	17	16	13	11	14	13	9	14	16	17	15	14	11	11	10	12	14	12	12	11	10	12	12	12	12	12	12	11	11	11	11	11

Source: 11v11.com
A = Away; H = Home; W = Win; D = Draw; L = Loss

== FA Cup ==
Southampton entered the 1922–23 FA Cup in the first round against Newcastle United, a well-established First Division side who were challenging for the title. According to club historians, "Few people gave Southampton a chance at St James' Park" in the 13 January 1923 game, but the team "fought the muddy battle well" to hold the top-flight side to a goalless draw; goalkeeper Tommy Allen was credited for his performance in particular. In the replay at home four days later, the Saints played "some of the best football ever seen at The Dell" to win 3–1 (despite conceding in the opening minute), with goals coming from Arthur Dominy (two) and Bill Rawlings. The second round match also pitted Second Division Southampton against a First Division club – this time strugglers Chelsea at Stamford Bridge – and also ended in a goalless draw. The tie again saw a replay scheduled at The Dell, which the Saints won in front of a season high attendance of 25,000 thanks to another goal from Dominy.

The pattern of results continued in the third round, as Bury and Southampton competed a goalless draw at Gigg Lane on 24 February. Again, it took a home replay for the Saints to beat the Shakers, which they did with another single goal from Arthur Dominy. In the fourth round, Southampton hosted fellow Second Division side West Ham United, who were then in fourth place in the table. Vic Watson scored for the visitors early on, but a "clever header" from Jack Elkes secured a 1–1 draw and forced at replay at Upton Park ten days later. The replay also ended 1–1, with Bill Rawlings scoring for the Saints. A second replay took place on 19 March at Villa Park, the home of top-flight club Aston Villa, in which the Hammers scored the only goal to advance to the semi-finals. Southampton brought in a total of £28,482 in FA Cup receipts, around £4,000 of which was used to improve the facilities at The Dell. West Ham later made it to the 1923 FA Cup Final, the first to be played at Wembley Stadium.

13 January 1923 Round 1	Newcastle United	0–0	Southampton	Newcastle upon Tyne
				Stadium: St James' Park; Attendance: 35,000

17 January 1923 Round 1 Replay	Southampton	3–1	Newcastle United	Southampton
	Dominy; Rawlings			Stadium: The Dell; Attendance: 18,000

3 February 1923 Round 2	Chelsea	0–0	Southampton	London
				Stadium: Stamford Bridge; Attendance: 67,105

7 February 1923 Round 2 Replay	Southampton	1–0	Chelsea	Southampton
	Dominy			Stadium: The Dell; Attendance: 25,000

24 February 1923 Round 3	Bury	0–0	Southampton	Bury
				Stadium: Gigg Lane; Attendance: 25,000

28 February 1923 Round 3 Replay	Southampton	1–0	Chelsea	Southampton
	Dominy			Stadium: The Dell; Attendance: 16,000

4 March 1923 Round 4	Southampton	1–1	West Ham United	Southampton
	Elkes		Watson	Stadium: The Dell; Attendance: 21,690

14 March 1923 Round 4 Replay	West Ham United	1–1	Southampton	London
			Rawlings	Stadium: Boleyn Ground; Attendance: 20,000

19 March 1923 Round 4 Replay 2	West Ham United	1–0	Southampton	Birmingham
				Stadium: Villa Park; Attendance: 22,184

== Other matches ==
Outside of the league and the FA Cup, Southampton played five additional first-team matches during the 1922–23 season. The first was a friendly match against First Division side Arsenal on 16 October 1922, which was a benefit for centre-half Alec Campbell. The high-scoring game ended in a 5–3 win for the Gunners, with the Saints scoring through Bill Rawlings (twice) and Arthur Dominy. The second friendly of the season was another benefit game – this time for long-serving manager Jimmy McIntyre – at home to local rivals Portsmouth in December. The visitors won the game 3–1 through goals from Dave Watson, Jerry Mackie and Alfred Strange, with Rawlings scoring the only goal for the Saints, who were described by the Southampton Times as displaying a "don't care attitude" towards the game.

Southampton and Portsmouth met again on 16 April 1923 in the first competition of the Rowland Hospital Cup, introduced to help raise money for hospitals in the local area. Played at Fratton Park, the game ended in a 2–1 win to the Second Division side, with the visitors' goals coming in the first half courtesy of Henry Johnson and Bill Rawlings. The game's quality was praised by commentators, who claimed that "It could not have been a more stirring game had the two clubs been fighting at the top of the same league". The sides met for a third time the following week, drawing 2–2 in the Hampshire Benevolent Cup. Pompey led through a Tom Parker own goal and a strike from Mackie, before the Saints responded through Johnson and Dominy. On 3 May, the Saints drew 2–2 with Northampton Town.

16 October 1922 Friendly	Southampton	3–5	Arsenal	Southampton
	Rawlings; Dominy			Stadium: The Dell

4 December 1922 Friendly	Southampton	1–3	Portsmouth	Southampton
	Rawlings		Watson; Mackie; Strange	Stadium: The Dell

16 April 1923 Rowland Hospital Cup	Portsmouth	1–2	Southampton	Portsmouth
	Martin		Johnson; Rawlings	Stadium: Fratton Park; Attendance: 7–8,000; Referee: F. C. Winton

23 April 1923 Hampshire BC	Southampton	2–2	Portsmouth	Southampton
	Johnson; Dominy		Parker (o.g.); Mackie	Stadium: The Dell; Referee: Albert Prince-Cox

3 May 1923 Friendly	Northampton Town	2–2	Southampton	Northampton
			Johnson	Stadium: County Ground

== Player details ==
Southampton manager Jimmy McIntyre used 22 different players during the 1922–23 season, nine of whom scored during the campaign. The team played in a 2–3–5 formation throughout the campaign, with two full-backs, three half-backs, two outside forwards, two inside forwards and a centre-forward. Only one player – right-half Bert Shelley – appeared in all 51 league and FA Cup matches. Inside-right Arthur Dominy played in all but two league matches during the season, and centre-half Bill Turner appeared in all except three. Dominy finished as the club's top scorer for the season, with 13 goals in the league and five in the cups. Bill Rawlings scored 12 goals in the league and three in the cups. Alec Campbell, George Getgood and Shelley were the club's only scoring half-backs of the season, with just one league goal each.

=== Squad statistics ===
Name	Pos.	Nat.	League		FA Cup		Other (Note: "Other" includes the Rowland Hospital Cup and Hampshire Benevolent Cup matches.)		Total	
Name	Pos.	Nat.	Apps.	Gls.	Apps.	Gls.	Apps.	Gls.	Apps.	Gls.
Tommy Allen	GK	(England)	31	0	7	0	0	0	38	0
Len Andrews	FW	(England)	18	0	8	0	2	0	28	0
Robert Blyth	FW	(England)	8	0	1	0	0	0	9	0
Charlie Brown	FW	(England)	32	2	8	0	2	0	42	2
Alec Campbell	HB	(England)	15	1	9	0	1	0	25	1
Alex Christie	HB	(Scotland)	5	0	0	0	0	0	5	0
Joe Clark	FW	(England)	20	0	1	0	0	0	21	0
John Cooper	FW	(England)	2	0	0	0	0	0	2	0
Arthur Dominy	FW	(England)	40	13	9	4	2	1	49	18
Jack Elkes	FW	(England)	31	5	9	1	0	0	40	6
Harry Hooper	FB	(England)	11	0	0	0	0	0	11	0
Ted Hough	FB	(England)	7	0	0	0	1	0	8	0
Henry Johnson	FW	(England)	9	1	0	0	2	2	11	3
Herbert Lock	GK	(England)	11	0	2	0	2	0	15	0
Willie McCall	FW	(Scotland)	8	2	0	0	0	0	8	2
Sammy Meston	FW	(England)	1	0	0	0	0	0	1	0
Tom Parker	FB	(England)	38	0	9	0	2	0	49	0
Bill Rawlings	FW	(England)	35	12	9	2	2	1	46	15
Bert Shelley	HB	(England)	42	1	9	0	2	0	53	1
Fred Titmuss	FB	(England)	35	0	9	0	2	0	46	0
Bill Turner	HB	(England)	39	0	9	0	2	0	50	0
Players with appearances who left before the end of the season
George Getgood	HB	(Scotland)	24	1	0	0	0	0	24	1

=== Most appearances ===
Rank	Name	Pos.	League		FA Cup		Other		Total	
Rank	Name	Pos.	Apps.	%	Apps.	%	Apps.	%	Apps.	%
1	Bert Shelley	HB	42	100.00	9	100.00	2	100.00	53	100.00
2	Arthur Dominy	FW	40	95.24	9	100.00	2	100.00	51	96.23
3	Bill Turner	HB	39	92.86	9	100.00	2	100.00	50	94.34
4	Tom Parker	FB	38	90.48	9	100.00	2	100.00	49	92.45
5	Bill Rawlings	FW	35	83.33	9	100.00	2	100.00	46	86.79
5	Fred Titmuss	FB	35	83.33	9	100.00	2	100.00	46	86.79
7	Charlie Brown	FW	32	76.19	8	88.89	2	100.00	42	79.25
7	Jack Elkes	FW	31	73.81	9	100.00	0	0.00	40	75.47
9	Tommy Allen	GK	31	73.81	7	77.78	0	0.00	38	71.70
10	Len Andrews	FW	18	42.86	8	88.89	2	100.00	28	52.83

=== Top goalscorers ===
Rank	Name	Pos.	League		FA Cup		Other		Total	
Rank	Name	Pos.	Gls.	GPG	Gls.	GPG	Gls.	GPG	Gls.	GPG
1	Arthur Dominy	FW	13	0.32	4	0.44	1	0.50	18	0.36
2	Bill Rawlings	FW	12	0.34	2	0.22	1	0.50	15	0.33
3	Jack Elkes	FW	5	0.16	1	0.11	0	0.00	6	0.15
4	Henry Johnson	FW	1	0.11	0	0.00	2	1.00	3	0.27
5	Willie McCall	FW	2	0.25	0	0.00	0	0.00	2	0.25
5	Charlie Brown	FW	2	0.06	0	0.00	0	0.00	2	0.04
7	George Getgood	HB	1	0.04	0	0.00	0	0.00	1	0.04
7	Alec Campbell	HB	1	0.06	0	0.00	0	0.00	1	0.03
7	Bert Shelley	HB	1	0.02	0	0.00	0	0.00	1	0.01

== Bibliography ==
- Chalk, Gary; Holley, Duncan (10 August 1987), A Complete Record of Southampton Football Club: 1885–1987, Derby, England: Breedon Books, ISBN 978-0907969228
- Chalk, Gary; Holley, Duncan; Bull, David (28 November 2013), All the Saints: A Complete Who's Who of Southampton FC, Bristol, England: Hagiology Publishing, ISBN 978-0992686406
- Juson, Dave; Aldworth, Clay; Bendel, Barry; Bull, David; Chalk, Gary (10 November 2004), Saints v Pompey: A History of Unrelenting Rivalry, Bristol, England: Hagiology Publishing, ISBN 978-0953447459
