= 1921–22 Southampton F.C. season =

English football club season

Southampton F.C.
1921–22 season
- Chairman: Tankerville Chamberlayne
- Manager: Jimmy McIntyre
- Stadium: The Dell
- Third Division South: Champions
- FA Cup: Second round
- Top goalscorer: League: Bill Rawlings (30); All: Bill Rawlings (33)
- Highest home attendance: 20,940 v Queens Park Rangers (27 December 1921)
- Lowest home attendance: 5,000 (multiple games)
- Average home league attendance: 11,140
- Biggest win: 8–0 v Northampton Town (24 December 1921)
- Biggest defeat: 0–2 v Gillingham (3 September 1921); 0–2 v Cardiff City (1 February 1922)
Home colours

The 1921–22 season was the 27th season of competitive football by Southampton, and the club's second in the Football League. After finishing second in the league the previous season, Southampton achieved promotion to the Second Division as champions of the newly regionalised Third Division South. Following a false start to the campaign, the Saints quickly asserted their dominance in the league when they went on a club record 19-game unbeaten run until the end of 1921. The club also remained unbeaten at The Dell for the entirety of the league season, as well as conceding a Football League record low 21 goals in 42 games, which remained in place until the 1978–79 season. Southampton finished atop the league table with 23 wins, 15 draws and four losses, ahead of runners-up Plymouth Argyle only on goal average.

In the 1921–22 FA Cup, Southampton beat Second Division side South Shields to reach the second round, but were knocked out following a replay by recently promoted First Division club Cardiff City, who had also eliminated them in the fourth round the previous year. The club ended the season hosting local rivals Portsmouth in the annual Hampshire Benevolent Cup charity match, which they won 3–1 thanks to two goals from Arthur Dominy and one from Bill Rawlings. Southampton also played four friendly matches during the campaign, beating Portsmouth 4–0 in a benefit game for club secretary and former manager Ernest Arnfield in October, losing 1–0 to Pompey the following month, defeating Preston North End 3–1 in a benefit game for Arthur Dominy in December, and beating amateur side Corinthian in February.

Southampton used 25 different players during the 1921–22 season and had ten different goalscorers. Their top scorer was centre-forward Bill Rawlings, who scored 30 goals in the Third Division South (one behind the division's top scorer, Plymouth's Frank Richardson) and two in the FA Cup. During the season, the club broke their record for highest league win, beating Northampton Town 8–0 at The Dell in December. Eight new players were signed by the club during the campaign, with seven released and sold to other clubs. The average attendance at The Dell during the 1921–22 season was 11,140. The highest attendance was 20,940 against Queens Park Rangers on 27 December 1921; the lowest was around 5,000 for matches against Millwall on 5 January 1922 and against Swansea Town on 20 February 1922.

== Background and transfers ==
Several players left Southampton at the end of the 1920–21 season. Most significant of the departures was inside-left James Moore, who had played every game the previous campaign; he returned to his native county of Yorkshire due to "family reasons", joining Second Division club Leeds United. He was replaced in the side by Henry Johnson, who had joined from Darlaston just before the end of the last season, and new addition Len Andrews, who was signed from Reading in August (he had previously played over 100 games for the Saints before World War I). Goalkeeper Arthur Wood, who had lost his place the previous year to new signing Tommy Allen, also left the club in May 1921 to join Second Division side Clapton Orient, where he remained for the rest of his career. Three more players left in the summer, all of whom had spent only one season at the club – centre-forward George Reader retired from the professional game and joined Harland and Wolff on a part-time basis, outside-right Frank Wright returned to his previous position at Hamstead Colliery, and inside-right George Williams joined fellow Third Division South side Exeter City, where he played for a season before being forced to part-retire due to a leg injury.

In addition to Andrews, Jimmy McIntyre brought in another two new players to Southampton before the start of the 1921–22 season. Full-back Harry Hooper joined for £10 from Brierley Hill Alliance, while centre-forward John Horton was brought in from Wombwell. A few months into the campaign, centre-half Ted Hough was signed from Talbot Stead Tubeworks, who was paid £200 and 52 pints of beer for his services. In January 1922, Sammy Meston – the son of former Southampton half-back Samuel Meston – joined from Sholing Athletic, and outside-right Robert Blyth signed from Portsmouth. In March, the club released two popular players to recently promoted First Division club Birmingham, who provided two of their own players in return. McIntyre's contributions were outside-left Fred Foxall and outside-right Joe Barratt, both of whom had played the majority of games up to that point, while their replacements were inside-left Jack Elkes and half-back George Getgood. Foxall had originally attempted to join top-flight side Aston Villa in May, but his transfer was reversed by the Football Association as Southampton had not given permission for the sale (he was also ordered to donate his signing-on fee to the National War Fund).

Players transferred in

Name	Nationality	Pos.	Club	Date	Fee	Ref.
Harry Hooper	England	FB	(England) Brierley Hill Alliance	May 1921	£10	
John Horton	England	FW	(England) Wombwell	May 1921	Unknown	
Len Andrews	England	FW	(England) Reading	August 1921	Unknown	
Ted Hough	England	FB	(England) Talbot Stead Tubeworks	October 1921	£200	
Robert Blyth	England	FW	(England) Portsmouth	January 1922	Unknown	
Sammy Meston	England	FW	(England) Sholing Athletic	January 1922	Unknown	
Jack Elkes	England	FW	(England) Birmingham	March 1922	Exchange	
George Getgood	Scotland	HB	(England) Birmingham	March 1922	Exchange	

Players transferred out

Name	Nationality	Pos.	Club	Date	Fee	Ref.
James Moore	England	FW	(England) Leeds United	May 1921	Free	
Arthur Wood	England	GK	(England) Clapton Orient	May 1921	Unknown	
George Williams	England	FW	(England) Exeter City	June 1921	Unknown	
Joe Barratt	England	FW	(England) Birmingham	March 1922	Exchange	
Fred Foxall	England	FW	(England) Birmingham	March 1922	Exchange	

Players released

Name	Nationality	Pos.	Date	Subsequent club	Ref.
George Reader	England	FW	May 1921	(England) Harland and Wolff	
Frank Wright	England	FW	May 1921	(England) Hamstead Colliery	

== Third Division South ==
Southampton's second Football League campaign began on 27 August 1921 with a home fixture against Gillingham, who had finished bottom of the Third Division table the previous year. The hosts won the game 2–0, with the two top scorers of the last campaign, Arthur Dominy and Bill Rawlings, scoring the goals. Despite this strong start, the Saints were slow to pick up pace in their opening league fixtures, as they were held to a goalless draw at Luton Town and lost 2–0 in the return fixture at Gillingham in their next two games. However, the side's fortunes quickly changed when they embarked on a club record 19-game unbeaten league run, beginning on 5 September with a 2–1 win over Luton at The Dell and not ending until the following January, over four months later. The run produced several high-scoring wins, including a 6–0 victory over Charlton Athletic in November (in which Rawlings scored a hat-trick) and an 8–0 defeat of Northampton Town in December (in which Rawlings scored half of the goals). The result against Northampton Town remained the club's single highest league win until October 2014, when it was equalled with a result of the same scoreline against Sunderland in the Premier League.

The club's unbeaten run finally came to an end on 14 January 1922, when they were beaten by a single goal at mid-table side Brentford. Rawlings scored four goals for a second time during the season the following week when the Saints faced Millwall, making him the first Southampton player to do so three times. However, the club continued to drop points in early 1922, and as a result dropped below main title contenders Plymouth Argyle in the table following a third loss of the season at Swansea Town on 25 February. New signings Jack Elkes and George Getgood debuted against Southend United in the next game, with the former scoring two goals in the convincing 5–2 win; however, he broke his collar bone in the next match, and remained injured for the remainder of the campaign. Southampton dropped valuable points against Argyle in April, when they lost 1–0 at Home Park and were held to a goalless draw at The Dell, with the Devon club pulling five points ahead at the top of the league table.

Despite this points deficit, Southampton had two games in hand over Plymouth, both of which they won 1–0: first over Newport County on 29 April, and second over Merthyr Town on 1 May. By the start of the final day of the season, Southampton were only one point behind leaders Plymouth Argyle, with a superior goal average. In their final game of the campaign, Southampton thrashed Newport County 5–0 in the return fixture at The Dell, with goals coming from Arthur Dominy (two), Alec Campbell, Rawlings and Henry Johnson. According to club historians, "no-one left The Dell" as the club waited for news from Loftus Road, where Plymouth were playing Queens Park Rangers in their final fixture. Argyle lost the match 2–0, which meant that they were level on points with Southampton, who had a superior goal average to secure them the top spot in the division. According to reports, the fans at The Dell "went wild with excitement, storming the ground, demanding to see the players". The club finished on 61 points from 23 wins, 15 draws and four losses; they conceded 21 goals, which was a record low for a Football League season until Liverpool surpassed it with just 16 goals in the 1978–79 season.

=== List of match results ===
27 August 1921 1	Southampton	2–0	Gillingham	Southampton
	Dominy; Rawlings			Stadium: The Dell; Attendance: 11,000

29 August 1921 2	Luton Town	0–0	Southampton	Luton
				Stadium: Kenilworth Road; Attendance: 10,000

3 September 1921 3	Gillingham	2–0	Southampton	Gillingham
				Stadium: Priestfield Stadium; Attendance: 6,000

5 September 1921 4	Southampton	2–1	Luton Town	Southampton
	Rawlings; Foxall			Stadium: The Dell; Attendance: 11,000

10 September 1921 5	Southampton	3–1	Swindon Town	Southampton
	Campbell; Barratt; Rawlings			Stadium: The Dell; Attendance: 12,000

17 September 1921 6	Swindon Town	2–3	Southampton	Swindon
			Rawlings; Andrews	Stadium: County Ground; Attendance: 9,000

24 September 1921 7	Southampton	3–0	Brighton & Hove Albion	Southampton
	Turner; Rawlings; Foxall			Stadium: The Dell; Attendance: 13,000

1 October 1921 8	Brighton & Hove Albion	0–1	Southampton	Hove
			Rawlings	Stadium: Goldstone Ground; Attendance: 10,000

8 October 1921 9	Norwich City	2–2	Southampton	Norwich
			Rawlings; Andrews	Stadium: The Nest; Attendance: 9,000

15 October 1921 10	Southampton	2–0	Norwich City	Southampton
	Rawlings			Stadium: The Dell; Attendance: 12,000

22 October 1921 11	Watford	1–1	Southampton	Watford
			Campbell	Stadium: Cassio Road; Attendance: 6,000

29 October 1921 12	Southampton	2–0	Watford	Southampton
	Campbell; Andrews			Stadium: The Dell; Attendance: 11,000

5 November 1921 13	Reading	0–1	Southampton	Reading
			Dominy	Stadium: Elm Park; Attendance: 12,000

12 November 1921 14	Southampton	0–0	Reading	Southampton
				Stadium: The Dell; Attendance: 11,000

19 November 1921 15	Southampton	6–0	Charlton Athletic	Southampton
	Rawlings; Dominy; Barratt			Stadium: The Dell; Attendance: 10,000

28 November 1921 16	Charlton Athletic	1–2	Southampton	London
			Dominy; Rawlings	Stadium: The Valley; Attendance: 9,000

3 December 1921 17	Millwall	0–1	Southampton	London
			Rawlings	Stadium: The Den; Attendance: 10,000

10 December 1921 18	Southampton	1–0	Bristol Rovers	Southampton
	Foxall			Stadium: The Dell; Attendance: 14,000

24 December 1921 19	Southampton	8–0	Northampton Town	Southampton
	Rawlings; Dominy; Johnson			Stadium: The Dell; Attendance: 10,000

26 December 1921 20	Queens Park Rangers	2–2	Southampton	London
			Campbell; Rawlings	Stadium: Loftus Road; Attendance: 12,000

27 December 1921 21	Southampton	1–1	Queens Park Rangers	Southampton
	Rawlings			Stadium: The Dell; Attendance: 20,940

31 December 1921 22	Southampton	0–0	Brentford	Southampton
				Stadium: The Dell; Attendance: 10,000

14 January 1922 23	Brentford	1–0	Southampton	Brentford
				Stadium: Griffin Park; Attendance: 11,000

21 January 1922 24	Southampton	4–2	Millwall	Southampton
	Rawlings			Stadium: The Dell; Attendance: 5,000

4 February 1922 25	Southampton	2–0	Exeter City	Southampton
	Dominy			Stadium: The Dell; Attendance: 7,000

11 February 1922 26	Exeter City	0–0	Southampton	Exeter
				Stadium: St James Park; Attendance: 6,000

20 February 1922 27	Southampton	1–1	Swansea Town	Southampton
	Rawlings			Stadium: The Dell; Attendance: 5,000

25 February 1922 28	Swansea Town	1–0	Southampton	Swansea
				Stadium: Vetch Field; Attendance: 14,000

4 March 1922 29	Southampton	5–0	Southend United	Southampton
	Dominy; Elkes; Campbell			Stadium: The Dell; Attendance: 11,000

11 March 1922 30	Southend United	0–0	Southampton	Southend-on-Sea
				Stadium: Kursaal; Attendance: 6,000

18 March 1922 31	Portsmouth	0–2	Southampton	Portsmouth
			Rawlings	Stadium: Fratton Park; Attendance: 26,382

25 March 1922 32	Southampton	1–1	Portsmouth	Southampton
	Rawlings			Stadium: The Dell; Attendance: 17,000

8 April 1922 33	Southampton	1–1	Merthyr Town	Southampton
	Brown			Stadium: The Dell; Attendance: 9,000

14 April 1922 34	Bristol Rovers	0–0	Southampton	Bristol
				Stadium: Eastville Stadium; Attendance: 25,000

15 April 1922 35	Plymouth Argyle	1–0	Southampton	Plymouth
				Stadium: Home Park; Attendance: 24,000

17 April 1922 36	Southampton	1–0	Aberdare Athletic	Southampton
	Johnson			Stadium: The Dell; Attendance: 13,000

18 April 1922 37	Aberdare Athletic	0–1	Southampton	Aberdare
			Campbell	Stadium: Athletic Ground; Attendance: 17,000

22 April 1922 38	Southampton	0–0	Plymouth Argyle	Southampton
				Stadium: The Dell; Attendance: 12,000

24 April 1922 39	Northampton Town	0–0	Southampton	Northampton
				Stadium: County Ground; Attendance: 7,000

29 April 1922 40	Newport County	0–1	Southampton	Newport
			Campbell	Stadium: Rodney Parade; Attendance: 4,000

1 May 1922 41	Merthyr Town	0–1	Southampton	Merthyr Tydfil
			Brown	Stadium: Penydarren Park; Attendance: 8,000

6 May 1922 42	Southampton	5–0	Newport County	Southampton
	Dominy; Campbell; Rawlings; Johnson			Stadium: The Dell; Attendance: 9,000

=== Final league table ===
Pos	Team	Pld	W	D	L	GF	GA	GAv	Pts	Qualification or relegation
1	Southampton (C, P)	42	23	15	4	68	21	3.238	61	Promotion to the Second Division
2	Plymouth Argyle	42	25	11	6	63	24	2.625	61	
3	Portsmouth	42	18	17	7	62	39	1.590	53	
4	Luton Town	42	22	8	12	64	35	1.829	52	
5	Queens Park Rangers	42	18	13	11	53	44	1.205	49	

(C) Champions; (P) Promoted

=== Results by matchday ===
Round	1	2	3	4	5	6	7	8	9	10	11	12	13	14	15	16	17	18	19	20	21	22	23	24	25	26	27	28	29	30	31	32	33	34	35	36	37	38	39	40	41	42
Ground	H	A	A	H	H	A	H	A	A	H	A	H	A	H	H	A	A	H	H	A	H	H	A	H	H	A	H	A	H	A	A	H	H	A	A	H	A	H	A	A	A	H
Result	W	D	L	W	W	W	W	W	D	W	D	W	W	D	W	W	W	W	W	D	D	D	L	W	W	D	D	L	W	D	W	D	D	D	L	W	W	D	D	W	W	W
Position	6	7	11	9	7	6	4	1	3	2	2	2	2	2	2	2	1	1	1	1	1	1	2	1	1	1	1	2	2	2	2	2	2	2	2	2	2	2	2	2	2	1

Source: 11v11.com
A = Away; H = Home; W = Win; D = Draw; L = Loss

== FA Cup ==
Southampton entered the 1921–22 FA Cup in the first round against Second Division side South Shields. Despite their lower league status, the Saints picked up a "convincing" 3–1 win over the second-tier club, with goals from Henry Johnson, Bill Rawlings and Arthur Dominy. In the second round, the club hosted recently promoted First Division side Cardiff City, who had knocked them out in the third round the previous season. The club held the top-flight side to a 1–1 draw at The Dell, but were unable to beat them in the replay at Ninian Park and were eliminated after a 2–0 loss.

7 January 1922 Round 1	Southampton	3–1	South Shields	Southampton
	Johnson; Rawlings; Dominy			Stadium: The Dell; Attendance: 14,497

28 January 1922 Round 2	Southampton	1–1	Cardiff City	Southampton
	Rawlings			Stadium: The Dell; Attendance: 19,291

1 February 1922 Round 2 replay	Cardiff City	2–0	Southampton	Cardiff
				Stadium: Ninian Park; Attendance: 40,000

== Other matches ==
Outside of the league and the FA Cup, Southampton played five additional first-team matches. The first was a friendly match at home to local rivals Portsmouth on 20 October 1921, which served as a benefit match for club secretary Ernest Arnfield. The Saints won the game 4–0, with all four goals coming in the second half – Arthur Dominy "walked the ball into the net" for the first, John Horton headed in a cross from Fred Foxall for the second, Foxall "completed a solo run" for the third, and Horton scored a second near the end of the game. The two sides met again just over a month later, with Fratton Park hosting a friendly to raise money for the Unemployment District Relief Fund. The game was much more even than the meeting at The Dell, with Percy Cherrett scoring the only goal to give Pompey the win.

In December, the club hosted Preston North End in a benefit match for Arthur Dominy, in which Bill Rawlings scored two and Foxall scored one to give the Saints a 3–1 win. A final friendly took place on 18 February 1922, in which Southampton defeated amateur club Corinthian by a single goal from Sammy Meston. Two days after the conclusion of the Third Division South campaign, Southampton and Portsmouth faced off again (for the fifth time that season) in the annual Hampshire Benevolent Cup fixture. The Saints won the match for only the fourth time in its history (Portsmouth having won it eight times to date, with one ending in a draw), with Dominy (two) and Rawlings scoring in the 3–1 win. Receipts for the match totalled £195, which the Southern Daily Echo described as "rather below the expected returns".

20 October 1921 Friendly	Southampton	4–0	Portsmouth	Southampton
	Dominy; Horton; Foxall			Stadium: The Dell; Attendance: 4,663; Referee: J. T. Howcroft

16 November 1921 Friendly	Portsmouth	1–0	Southampton	Portsmouth
				Stadium: Fratton Park; Referee: Albert Prince-Cox

5 December 1921 Friendly	Southampton	3–1	Preston North End	Southampton
	Rawlings; Foxall			Stadium: The Dell

18 February 1922 Friendly	Southampton	1–0	Corinthian	Southampton
	Meston			Stadium: The Dell; Attendance: 12,000

8 May 1922 Hampshire BC	Southampton	3–1	Portsmouth	Southampton
	Dominy; Rawlings			Stadium: The Dell; Referee: J. Head

== Player details ==
Southampton manager Jimmy McIntyre used 25 different players during the 1921–22 season, ten of whom scored during the campaign. The team played in a 2–3–5 formation throughout the campaign, with two full-backs, three half-backs, two outside forwards, two inside forwards and a centre-forward. Three players appeared in all 45 league and FA Cup matches: goalkeeper Tommy Allen, right-half Bert Shelley and left-back Fred Titmuss. Inside-right Arthur Dominy played all but one league match during the season, and centre-forward Bill Rawlings appeared in all except four. Rawlings finished as the club's top scorer for the season, with 30 goals in the league and three in the cups, with Dominy's 16 goals across league and cup placing him second. Alec Campbell was the club's highest-scoring half-back of the season with eight league goals.

=== Squad statistics ===
Name	Pos.	Nat.	League		FA Cup		Hampshire BC		Total	
Name	Pos.	Nat.	Apps.	Gls.	Apps.	Gls.	Apps.	Gls.	Apps.	Gls.
Tommy Allen	GK	(England)	42	0	3	0	1	0	46	0
Len Andrews	FW	(England)	34	3	1	0	0	0	35	0
Robert Blyth	FW	(Scotland)	0	0	0	0	1	0	1	0
Ken Boyes	FW	(England)	4	0	0	0	0	0	4	0
George Bradburn	HB	(England)	1	0	1	0	0	0	2	0
Charlie Brown	FW	(England)	20	2	1	0	0	0	21	2
Len Butt	HB	(England)	4	0	1	0	0	0	5	0
Alec Campbell	HB	(England)	37	8	2	0	1	0	40	8
Joe Clark	FW	(England)	0	0	0	0	1	0	1	0
John Cooper	FW	(England)	3	0	0	0	0	0	3	0
Arthur Dominy	FW	(England)	41	13	3	1	1	2	45	16
Jack Elkes	FW	(England)	2	2	0	0	0	0	2	2
George Getgood	HB	(Scotland)	11	0	0	0	0	0	11	0
Harry Hooper	FB	(England)	4	0	1	0	0	0	5	0
John Horton	FW	(England)	1	0	0	0	0	0	1	0
Ted Hough	FB	(England)	1	0	0	0	0	0	1	0
Henry Johnson	FW	(England)	18	4	2	1	0	0	20	5
Sammy Meston	FW	(England)	1	0	0	0	1	0	2	0
Tom Parker	FB	(England)	38	0	2	0	1	0	41	0
Bill Rawlings	FW	(England)	38	30	3	2	1	1	42	33
Bert Shelley	HB	(England)	42	0	3	0	1	0	46	0
Fred Titmuss	FB	(England)	42	0	3	0	1	0	46	0
Bill Turner	HB	(England)	31	1	2	0	1	0	34	1
Players with appearances who left before the end of the season
Joe Barratt	FW	(England)	22	2	2	0	0	0	24	2
Fred Foxall	FW	(England)	25	3	3	0	0	0	28	3

=== Most appearances ===
Rank	Name	Pos.	League		FA Cup		Hampshire BC		Total	
Rank	Name	Pos.	Apps.	%	Apps.	%	Apps.	%	Apps.	%
1	Tommy Allen	GK	42	100.00	3	100.00	1	100.00	46	100.00
1	Bert Shelley	HB	42	100.00	3	100.00	1	100.00	46	100.00
1	Fred Titmuss	FB	42	100.00	3	100.00	1	100.00	46	100.00
4	Arthur Dominy	FW	41	97.62	3	100.00	1	100.00	45	97.83
5	Bill Rawlings	FW	38	90.48	3	100.00	1	100.00	42	91.30
6	Tom Parker	FB	38	90.48	2	66.67	1	100.00	41	89.13
7	Alec Campbell	HB	37	88.10	2	66.67	1	100.00	40	86.96
8	Len Andrews	FW	34	80.95	1	33.33	0	0.00	35	76.09
9	Bill Turner	HB	31	73.81	2	66.67	1	100.00	34	73.91
10	Fred Foxall	FW	25	59.52	3	100.00	0	0.00	28	60.87

=== Top goalscorers ===
Rank	Name	Pos.	League		FA Cup		Hampshire BC		Total	
Rank	Name	Pos.	Gls.	GPG	Gls.	GPG	Gls.	GPG	Gls.	GPG
1	Bill Rawlings	FW	30	0.78	2	0.66	1	1.00	33	0.78
2	Arthur Dominy	FW	13	0.31	1	0.33	2	2.00	16	0.35
3	Alec Campbell	HB	8	0.21	0	0.00	0	0.00	8	0.20
4	Henry Johnson	FW	4	0.22	1	0.50	0	0.00	5	0.25
5	Fred Foxall	FW	3	0.12	0	0.00	0	0.00	3	0.10
5	Len Andrews	FW	3	0.08	0	0.00	0	0.00	3	0.08
7	Jack Elkes	FW	2	1.00	0	0.00	0	0.00	2	1.00
7	Charlie Brown	FW	2	0.10	0	0.00	0	0.00	2	0.09
7	Joe Barratt	FW	2	0.09	0	0.00	0	0.00	2	0.08
10	Bill Turner	HB	1	0.03	0	0.00	0	0.00	1	0.02

== Bibliography ==
- Cavallini, Rob (2007), Play Up Corinth: A History of the Corinthian Football Club, Stroud: Stadia, ISBN 978-0752444796
- Chalk, Gary; Holley, Duncan (10 August 1987), A Complete Record of Southampton Football Club: 1885–1987, Derby, England: Breedon Books, ISBN 978-0907969228
- Chalk, Gary; Holley, Duncan; Bull, David (28 November 2013), All the Saints: A Complete Who's Who of Southampton FC, Bristol, England: Hagiology Publishing, ISBN 978-0992686406
- Juson, Dave; Aldworth, Clay; Bendel, Barry; Bull, David; Chalk, Gary (10 November 2004), Saints v Pompey: A History of Unrelenting Rivalry, Bristol, England: Hagiology Publishing, ISBN 978-0953447459
