= Bill Henderson (footballer, born 1899) =

English footballer

Personal information
- Full name: William James Henderson
- Date of birth: 11 January 1899
- Place of birth: Carlisle, England
- Date of death: 1934 (aged 35)
- Place of death: Carlisle, England
- Height: 5 ft 9 in (1.75 m)
- Position: Outside right

Senior career*
Years	Team	Apps	(Gls)
????–1921	Carlisle United		
1921–1923	Arsenal	7	(0)
1923	Luton Town	2	(0)
1923–1928	Southampton	152	(10)
1928–1929	Coventry City	15	(1)
1929–1930	Carlisle United	9	(2)
- * Club domestic league appearances and goals

William James Henderson (11 January 1899 – 1934) was an English footballer who played at outside-right in the 1920s, spending most of his career with Southampton.

== Football career ==
=== Early career ===
Henderson was born in Carlisle and started his professional career with his home-town club, Carlisle United, then playing in the North Eastern League.

In October 1921, he moved to London, to join First Division Arsenal, for a fee of £1,000. Initially Henderson played as a centre forward, and deputised for Henry White or Andrew Young; he made five appearances in 1921–22, his debut coming against Huddersfield Town on 22 October 1921.

He found first-team opportunities rare with the Gunners; he was moved out on to the right wing in 1922–23 with two appearances, but was unable to supplant long-serving former England international, Jock Rutherford. After 18 months at Highbury, during which time he made seven appearances in total, Henderson dropped down to the Third Division South with Luton Town in March 1923. He only made two appearances for Luton, before he was signed by Southampton.

=== Southampton ===
In November 1923, Southampton paid Luton a transfer fee of £500 for Henderson's services in an attempt to cure their problems at outside-right. Following the transfer of Joe Barratt to Birmingham in March 1922, the "Saints" had tried several players on the right, including Charlie Brown, Robert Blyth and Sammy Meston, none of whom had any conspicuous success.

He soon made the outside-right berth his own and over the next five years he entertained The Dell crowd with his unconventional style of football. According to Holley & Chalk in "The Alphabet of the Saints", Henderson was "a puzzling player, not only to the opposition, but often to his own team-mates. He could make the most amazing runs, dribbling the ball through places where it did not seem possible". His foot-work was so convoluted that he was nicknamed "Tishy" after a famous race-horse of the day who crossed his legs as he ran. Henderson's play shifted "unaccountably, from the exquisite to sheer vaudeville".

In his first season at The Dell, Henderson made 23 appearances, scoring once in a 2–0 victory over Bradford City on 11 February 1924. In the following season he made 34 league appearances, missing eight games through injury, when he was replaced by Tommy Broad. Saints had a great run in the FA Cup defeating Liverpool in round 4, to reach the semi-final at Stamford Bridge, where they were defeated 2–0 by Sheffield United on 28 March 1925. In the semi-final Tom Parker had a dreadful afternoon, first scoring an own-goal, then suffering a rare miss from the penalty spot (shooting straight at the 'keeper) before a mix-up between him and goalkeeper Tommy Allen gave Sheffield their second goal.

In 1925–26, Henderson made 34 appearances, scoring three goals – he missed eight games through injury in October/November, when Cuthbert Coundon stood in for him. By now, Henderson was developing a useful partnership with Arthur Dominy on his inside, helping Bill Rawlings at centre-forward to continue as the Saints top-scorer for the fifth of six seasons since the club joined the Football League.

The 1926–27 season saw the Saints again have a great FA Cup run reaching the semi-final, defeating Newcastle United on the way. In the semi-final, played at Stamford Bridge on 26 March 1927, Saints were eliminated 2–1 by Arsenal with Saints' goal coming from Bill Rawlings. In this match, Saints came up against Tom Parker who had had a nightmare in Saints' previous semi-final appearance two years earlier. This time Parker was on the winning side as Arsenal moved on to Wembley, losing to Cardiff City in the final.

In the League, Henderson had his most successful season, now playing with Dick Rowley at inside-right, when he scored six goals (from 38 appearances), including a pair against Middlesbrough in a 2–1 victory on 30 August 1926.

Henderson broke his arm in the fourth match of 1927–28 and missed a large part of the season, with Coundon again filling in for him. In Henderson's absence, the team struggled and finished the season only two points above the relegation zone.

In his five years at The Dell, Henderson made a total of 168 appearances, scoring ten goals.

=== Later career ===
After five years with Southampton, Henderson was sold to Coventry City for £200, at the same time as Tommy Allen, with Bill Stoddart moving the other way in exchange. He spent a season with Coventry, before returning to his home-town where he spent his final season back at Carlisle United, now in the Football League Third Division North.

== After football ==
Following his retirement in 1930, Henderson remained in Carlisle, where he ran a tobacconist shop, until his death in 1934, aged 35.
