= Reg Hackett =

English footballer (1891–1967)

Personal information
- Full name: Reginald Lawrence Hackett
- Date of birth: 1891
- Place of birth: Cradley Heath, England
- Date of death: 1967 (aged 75–76)
- Place of death: Warley, West Midlands, England
- Height: 5 ft 8 in (1.73 m)
- Position: Half-back

Youth career
- Cradley Heath St. Lukes

Senior career*
Years	Team	Apps	(Gls)
–	Blackheath Town		
1919–1920	Southampton	31	(0)

International career
–	England juniors	2	(0)
- * Club domestic league appearances and goals

Reginald Lawrence Hackett (1891–1967) was an English professional footballer who played at left-half for Southampton during the 1919–20 season.

== Football career ==
Hackett was born in Cradley Heath and started his football career with Blackheath Town, where he had gained two England junior international caps against Ireland and Scotland. In 1919, he was spotted by Southampton's trainer, Jimmy McIntyre, who had been working in Coventry during the First World War and, along with two teammates (including outside-left Fred Foxall) was signed in time for the 1919–20 Southern League season.

Hackett made his debut for the "Saints" in the opening match of the season, a 1–1 draw at The Dell against Exeter City on 30 August. Described as a "consistent performer", Hackett retained his place at left-half, rarely missing a match until early March, when an injury led to him missing most of the rest of the season, with Bill Turner replacing him.

In the summer of 1920, after 31 League and two FA Cup matches, Hackett left the club and returned to Birmingham, where he later played in the Birmingham League.
