= Charlie Brown (footballer, born 1898) =

English footballer

Personal information
- Date of birth: 14 January 1898
- Place of birth: Stakeford, England
- Date of death: 2 February 1979 (aged 81)
- Place of death: Southampton, England
- Height: 5 ft 9 in (1.75 m)
- Position: Outside right

Youth career
- Stakeford United

Senior career*
Years	Team	Apps	(Gls)
1920–1924	Southampton	83	(8)
1924–1926	Queens Park Rangers	67	(3)
1926–1927	Poole		
- * Club domestic league appearances and goals

Charles Brown (14 January 1898 – 2 February 1979) was an English footballer who played at outside-right for Southampton and Queens Park Rangers in the 1920s.

== Football career ==
Brown was born in Stakeford, Northumberland and played for his local non-league side where he was spotted by a scout from Southampton. He signed for the "Saints" in March 1920, and played the last three Southern League matches in April/May 1920, playing at inside-right alongside Arthur Dominy and Jimmy Moore.

Under manager Jimmy McIntyre, the Saints were admitted into Division 3 of the Football League in 1920, in common with most clubs in the Southern League Division One. Brown made intermittent appearances in the early part of the season, but in December he was dropped following a poor game at Grimsby Town. He was re-called to the side in March, taking over at outside-right from Joe Barratt and retained his place for the rest of the season.

In 1921–22, Brown was used as cover for Barratt and was in and out of the side until Barratt was sold to Birmingham in March, when Brown made the No. 7 shirt his own. In the following season, Brown was a permanent fixture until early December when an injury caused him to miss a month, with Robert Blyth taking over. Brown regained his place in January for the rest of the season, and also played an important part in the Saints' FA Cup run, where they reached the Fourth Round going out to eventual cup winners, West Ham United after two replays.

Brown was described as a "quick and crafty" winger, whose play "had a subtle way of drawing a defence before centring". Unfortunately for the Dell faithful, his best play tended to come in away matches and the Dell crowd seemed to unsettle him.

For the start of the 1923–24 season, Brown lost his place to Sammy Meston, but regained his place after the first six matches before new signing Bill Henderson took over in November.

In August 1924, Brown moved to Queens Park Rangers where he had two good seasons before dropping down to non-league football.

== Later career ==
In 1926, Brown returned to Southampton to live and took up employment with Supermarine at Woolston, before joining Vosper Thornycroft in 1936 where he remained until his retirement in 1967.

== Honours ==
Southampton

- Football League Third Division South champions: 1921–22
