= Len Butt =

Len or Leonard Butt may refer to:

- Len Butt (footballer, born 1893) (died 1993), English footballer with Southampton and Bournemouth
- Len Butt (footballer, born 1910) (died 1994), English footballer with Huddersfield Town and Blackburn Rovers
