= Joe Barratt =

English footballer (1895–1968)

Personal information
- Full name: Josiah Barratt
- Date of birth: 21 February 1895
- Place of birth: Bulkington, Warwickshire, England
- Date of death: April 1968 (aged 73)
- Place of death: Coventry, England
- Height: 5 ft 8 in (1.73 m)
- Position: Right winger

Youth career
- Nuneaton Town

Senior career*
Years	Team	Apps	(Gls)
1919–1922	Southampton	93	(7)
1922–1923	Birmingham	30	(1)
1923–1924	Pontypridd		
1924–1926	Lincoln City	74	(8)
1926–1927	Bristol Rovers	21	(4)
- Nuneaton Town
1930–19??	Coventry Colliery		
- * Club domestic league appearances and goals

Josiah Barratt (21 February 1895 – April 1968) was an English professional footballer who played as a winger for various clubs in the 1920s.

== Playing career ==
Barratt was born in Bulkington, Warwickshire and played his early football with local side Nuneaton Town. During the First World War he served with the Royal Berkshire Regiment and was a guest player for Leicester Fosse, Birmingham and Southampton.

At the end of the war, he signed for Southampton in time for the first post-war season. Playing on the right-wing, he only missed one game in Southampton's final season in the Southern League as he provided the crosses for the forwards, Arthur Dominy and Bill Rawlings to score. In 1920 Southampton, along with most Southern League clubs, joined the inaugural Football League Third Division. According to Holley & Chalk's "The Alphabet of the Saints", "his creative, storming runs down the right flank were most effective as Saints made the successful transition between the Southern League and Division Three". Barratt had the unusual habit of always playing with a piece of straw in his mouth.

In March 1921, he was injured (to be replaced by Charlie Brown) and was unable to help in the run-in to the end of the season when Saints finished second, missing out on the only available promotion spot. For the following season, he reclaimed his place in the starting line-up from Brown and missed only a few games before he was suddenly transferred to Birmingham in March. At the time Southampton were leading the Third Division South table and their fans were confident of gaining promotion. Manager Jimmy McIntyre shocked them by announcing a four player transfer, with wingers Fred Foxall and Barratt moving to Birmingham in exchange for Jack Elkes (a forward) and George Getgood (a half-back). In his three years at The Dell Barratt made 101 appearances in all competitions, scoring eight goals.

Barratt played in 26 consecutive First Division games from his arrival at Birmingham until injury intervened in November 1922. He failed to regain a regular place, and in June 1923 joined Pontypridd for one season, during which he helped the club to the championship of the Welsh Football League. He returned to the Football League with Lincoln City for two years, before spending 1926–27 with Bristol Rovers. He then went back to his first club Nuneaton Town and also played for Coventry Colliery.

After the Second World War he joined Coventry City as a youth team coach. He died in Coventry in April 1968, aged 73.

== Personal life ==
He was the father of Harry Barratt, who played for Coventry City before becoming Gillingham manager.

== Honours ==
Southampton

- Football League Third Division South champions: 1921–22
