= Getgood =

Getgood is a surname. Notable people with the surname include:

- George Getgood (1892–1970), Scottish professional footballer
- Robert Getgood (1882–1964), politician and trade unionist in Northern Ireland
- Adam "Nolly" Getgood, former live bassist, and current studio bassist for the American progressive metal band Periphery
