= Bill Turner (footballer, born 1894) =

English footballer (1894-1970)

Personal information
- Full name: William Turner
- Date of birth: 22 December 1894
- Place of birth: South Moor, Stanley, County Durham
- Date of death: 1970 (aged 75–76)
- Height: 5 ft 10 in (1.78 m)
- Position: Half back

Youth career
- Dipton United
- Scotswood
- Leadgate Park

Senior career*
Years	Team	Apps	(Gls)
1919–1924	Southampton	166	(1)
1924–1927	Bury	76	(0)
1927–1928	Queens Park Rangers	38	(0)
- * Club domestic league appearances and goals

William Turner (22 December 1894 – 1970) was an English footballer who played as a half back with Southampton, Bury and Queens Park Rangers in the 1920s.

== Football career ==
Turner was born in South Moor, Stanley, County Durham and played his early football with various clubs in North East England, including Dipton United, Scotswood and Leadgate Park. His professional career was delayed by the First World War but in September 1919 he moved to the South Coast to join Southern League, Southampton for a fee of £200.

=== Southampton ===
He made his "Saints" debut on 8 November 1919 in a 4–0 victory (three goals from Bill Rawlings) over Southend United when he took over at left back from Fred Titmuss. Following injuries to half backs, George Bradburn and Reg Hackett in March 1920, Turner was moved forward to left-half, a position he retained for the rest of his professional career.

In 1920, the Saints were elected to the Football League Third Division for its inaugural season, in which Turner was ever-present. Although they finished second in the league, Southampton missed out on the only promotion spot to Crystal Palace. Under manager Jimmy McIntyre, Saints went one better in 1921–22, finishing equal on points with Plymouth Argyle but with a superior goal average, with Turner once again ever-present. He was the only member of the promotion side who cost Southampton a fee, with Saints conceding only 21 goals. This total of goals conceded in a 42 match season was a Football League record which stood until 1979 and remains a record for Southampton.

The half back line of Bert Shelley, Alec Campbell and Turner cemented Saints place in the Second Division over the next few years, until Turner lost his place to Arthur Bradford in April 1924.

In 1924, he moved to the First Division Bury – in his five seasons at The Dell, Turner made 166 league and 20 FA Cup appearances, scoring once.

=== Bury and Q.P.R. ===
In a bid to strengthen the team following their return to the First Division, Bury signed Turner in April 1924, with Stan Woodhouse and John Callagher moving to the south coast as part of the deal.

Turner was ever-present for the 1924–25 season as Bury finished fifth in the table, followed up by a fourth-place finish in 1926. In the 1926–27 season injury restricted Turner to five appearances, as manager James Hunter tried several players at left half, with the team finishing just above the relegation zone.

After three years of dependable service, Turner returned to the Third Division South in 1927, spending one season with Queens Park Rangers before retiring.

== Honours ==
Southampton

- Football League Third Division South champions: 1921–22
