= Len Butt (footballer, born 1893) =

English footballer (1893–1993)

Personal information
- Full name: George Leonard Butt
- Date of birth: 20 December 1893
- Place of birth: Freemantle, Southampton, England
- Date of death: 3 December 1993 (aged 99)
- Height: 5 ft 6 in (1.68 m)
- Position: Left-half

Youth career
- Malmesbury United
- Shirley St James

Senior career*
Years	Team	Apps	(Gls)
1912–1919	Southampton	0	(0)
1919–1920	Thornycrofts		
1920–1922	Southampton	17	(0)
1922–1927	Bournemouth & Boscombe Athletic	136	(2)
1927–19??	Cowes		
- * Club domestic league appearances and goals

George Leonard Butt (20 December 1893 – 3 December 1993) was an English footballer who played as a half-back in the 1920s, spending the majority of his career with Bournemouth & Boscombe Athletic.

== Football career ==
Butt was born in Freemantle, Southampton and played his youth football with various local teams. Whilst playing on Southampton Common, he was spotted by a Southampton player, Bert Lee, who invited Butt to The Dell for a trial.

Butt signed as a professional in April 1912 and spent the next two years as a reserve team player. On the outbreak of World War I, Butt enlisted in the 5th Hampshire Regiment and spent much of the next four years serving in India, where he played cricket for his regiment. On returning to Southampton at the end of the war, he found employment with the Thornycroft shipbuilding works at Woolston. Butt played for the works team, who were then one of the finest non-league teams in Southern England, and was paid ten shillings a game. During Butt's time with the club, they reached the First Round of the FA Cup, where they took Burnley, of the First Division, to a replay.

Butt's form with Thornycrofts once again attracted the attention of Bert Lee, now Southampton's trainer, and in August 1920 he re-joined the "Saints" as a full-time professional.

Although small for a half-back, Butt was quick into a tackle and his wholehearted attitude earned the nickname "Badger Butt". Butt spent two seasons with Southampton, during which period he made 18 first-team appearances – he was prevented from playing more regularly by the form of the established half-back line-up of Bert Shelley, Alec Campbell and Bill Turner, and was only called into the first team if one of these was injured. His longest run in the side came at the end of the 1920–21 season, when he played 11 matches at left-half, taking over from Turner, who had dropped to right-back as replacement for the injured Tom Parker.

Butt joined Boscombe, then playing in the Southern League, on a free transfer in June 1922 and was appointed team captain. Within a year, Boscombe gained admittance to the Football League Third Division South as Southern League runners-up, and changed their name to "Bournemouth & Boscombe Athletic". Butt remained at Dean Court for a further four years, rarely missing a match in the first three Football League seasons, before retiring in the autumn of 1927.

He continued to play for Cowes on the Isle of Wight for many years. In 1932, he played at The Dell for Cowes in the Hampshire Senior Cup final against Isle of Wight rivals, Newport – the Newport side included two ex-Southampton players, Bill Rawlings and Arthur Dominy and a crowd of 20,000 witnessed a Newport victory.

== Later career ==
Butt became the licensee of The Sailors Home pub in Bevois Street, Southampton and continued to watch Southampton and Hampshire County Cricket Club well into his 90s. He died on 3 December 1993, shortly before his 100th birthday; at the time of his death, he was the last surviving player who signed for Southampton when they were still in the Southern League.
