= Harry Yeomans =

English footballer

Personal information
- Full name: Harry Arthur Yeomans
- Date of birth: 11 April 1901
- Place of birth: Farnborough, England
- Date of death: 25 February 1965 (aged 63)
- Place of death: Lavendon, England
- Height: 6 ft 4 in (1.93 m)
- Position: Goalkeeper

Youth career
- Camberley & Yorktown

Senior career*
Years	Team	Apps	(Gls)
1922–1926	Southampton	12	(0)
- * Club domestic league appearances and goals

Harry Arthur Yeomans (11 April 1901 – 25 February 1965) was an English footballer who played as goalkeeper for Southampton in the mid-1920s.

== Football career ==
Yeomans was born in Farnborough and played as an amateur for Camberley & Yorktown, also representing the Hampshire F.A., before joining Southampton in December 1922. At 6 ft 4 in (1.93 m), Yeomans was the tallest goalkeeper to have played for the "Saints" (along with George Ephgrave). Known as "Tiny", Yeomans was signed as understudy to Tommy Allen and consequently never enjoyed a lengthy run in the first team, making four appearances in April 1925 and eight in the following September/October.

In 1926, Yeomans decided to abandon his footballing career and joined the local Police force, for whom he played in the local football leagues.
