= South Stoneham Cemetery =

Cemetery in Southampton, England

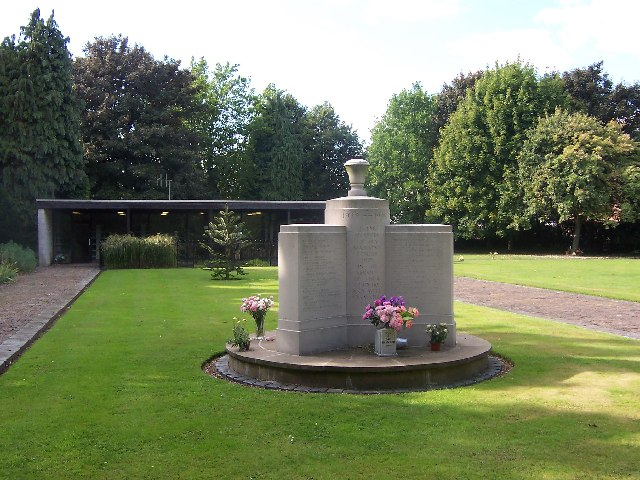
Memorial to cremated war dead

The South Stoneham municipal cemetery, situated off Mansbridge Road, Southampton (at 50°56′26″N 01°22′06″W), was opened in early 1905, with the first burial taking place on 4 February, and was extended in 1927. The South Stoneham Crematorium was located north of the cemetery but demolished during 1973 to make way for the construction of the M27 motorway. The South Stoneham garden of remembrance is now located at the north end of the cemetery.

The cemetery includes the graves of 66 military casualties which are maintained by the Commonwealth War Graves Commission, comprising 3 Commonwealth and 2 Belgian war graves of World War I and 61 Commonwealth graves of World War II.

The crematorium was opened in 1932 but by the 1960s was becoming inadequate for the growing number of cremations, and its equipment was approaching obsolescence. As a result, the council built a new crematorium in Bassett Green Road, which was opened in October 1973, with the South Stoneham Crematorium closing at the same time. The buildings were demolished during the construction of the new motorway with the garden of rest being re-located on an adjacent strip of allotment land. The complete layer of topsoil containing the cremated remains in the old garden of rest was removed and transferred to the new site by hand with the topsoil being placed in the new garden in the same relative position.

Despite the move of the crematorium and its grounds to Bassett Green Road, 78 Commonwealth service personnel who were cremated here during World War II are still commemorated in the grounds in South Stoneham by a Commonwealth War Graves Commission memorial standing amid flower beds near a lily pool. Among them is Alastair (Alec) Campbell, former cricketer and professional footballer for Southampton, who died serving in the Royal Artillery in 1943.

Amongst others buried or remembered at South Stoneham Cemetery are R. J. Mitchell, the designer of the Supermarine Spitfire, whose ashes were interred at South Stoneham in June 1937. George Kemp, who assisted Marconi in his early radio telegraph experiments, is buried in the cemetery.
