= James Moore (footballer, born 1891) =

English footballer and manager

Personal information
- Date of birth: 1 September 1891
- Place of birth: Felling, Tyne and Wear, England
- Date of death: 1972 (aged 80–81)
- Height: 5 ft 8 in (1.73 m)
- Position: Forward

Youth career
- Boldon Colliery Welfare
- Jarrow Croft

Senior career*
Years	Team	Apps	(Gls)
1911–1915	Barnsley	101	(23)
1919–1921	Southampton	83	(22)
1921–1922	Leeds United	27	(4)
1922–1923	Brighton & Hove Albion	6	(2)
1923–1924	Halifax Town	40	(6)
1924–1925	Queens Park Rangers	26	(5)
1925–1926	Crewe Alexandra	13	(6)

Managerial career
- 1927–1928: NAC Breda
- 1928–1929: Enschedese Boys
- 1929–1930: HRC
- * Club domestic league appearances and goals

James Moore (1 September 1891 – December 1972) was an English professional football player and coach who played as a forward for various clubs either side of the First World War. He was part of the Barnsley team that won the FA Cup in 1912. He later became a coach in the Netherlands.

== Club career ==
Moore was born at Felling, Tyne and Wear and was trained as a carpenter. He played his early football at local level, with Boldon Colliery Welfare and Jarrow Croft.

=== Barnsley ===
He joined Barnsley in August 1911, shortly before his twentieth birthday, and was brought into the first team to replace the injured Bert Leavey in the third replay of the Fourth Round FA Cup match against Bradford City on 21 March 1912. He retained his place for the 1912 FA Cup final which Barnsley won 1–0 in extra time in a replay after the first game ended goalless. He had a good shot saved in the first match but the Manchester Guardian felt he did not get enough passes in the replay and did not have much impact on the game.

=== Southampton ===
During World War I, he was employed at the Saunders boat-yard in Cowes on the Isle of Wight where he was engaged on the construction of aeroplanes. During the war he guested for Southampton, playing in 24 matches (scoring 22 goals) between 1916 and 1919. After the cessation of hostilities, he was persuaded to sign for the "Saints" on a permanent basis in May 1919, in readiness for the first post-war season.

He made his Southern League debut in the opening match of the 1919–20 season, when he scored in a 1–1 draw at home to Exeter City. Moore soon became a fixture at inside left, playing between Fred Foxall on the wing and Bill Rawlings in the centre, and missed only one match during the season, in which the Saints finished in eighth place.

Moore was described as "neat in his footwork, (and) also a particularly clever header of the ball (who) seemed to be able to glide it to the feet of his winger with un-nerving accuracy". He was known as "the man who never smiled" and was notorious for his unhappy expression; despite this, he was a popular player.

Under manager Jimmy McIntyre, the Saints were admitted into Division 3 of the Football League in 1920, in common with most clubs in the Southern League Division One. Moore was sent off in a home match against Grimsby Town on 4 December 1920; the game was lost 1–0, with Tom Parker missing a penalty in the Saints' first home defeat of the season. Moore thus became the first Southampton player to be sent off in a Football League fixture. Moore only received a caution for his offence and was able to continue to occupy the inside left position throughout the season, in which he was ever-present. Saints finished their inaugural Football League season as runners-up to Crystal Palace, but only the champions were promoted.

At the end of the season, he was granted a transfer to Leeds United for family reasons. In his two seasons at The Dell he made a total of 89 appearances scoring 22 goals.

=== Leeds United ===
At Leeds, he joined a club who were starting their second season in Football League Second Division. Moore was brought into the side to lend the team some experience, but in his one season at Elland Road he had to contest the No. 10 shirt with Jack Swann and made only 27 appearances, scoring four goals.

=== Later career ===
He left Leeds in June 1922, and then spent time with Brighton and Hove Albion (June 1922 to September 1923), Halifax Town (September 1923 to November 1924), Queens Park Rangers (November 1924 to July 1925) and Crewe Alexandra (July 1925 to May 1926).

He then spent time in the Netherlands, coaching with NAC Breda. He became manager of Enschedese Boys from 1928 to 1929 and he also coached the Dutch club HRC between 1929 and 1930, before returning to Barnsley where he purchased a greengrocery business. After World War II, he was appointed a director of Barnsley F.C.

== Honours ==
Barnsley

- FA Cup winners: 1912
