= Jack Elkes =

English footballer (1894-1972)

Personal information
- Full name: Albert John Elkes
- Date of birth: 31 December 1894
- Place of birth: Snedshill, Oakengates, Shropshire, England
- Date of death: 22 January 1972 (aged 77)
- Place of death: Rayleigh, Essex, England
- Height: 6 ft 0 in (1.83 m)
- Positions: Inside left; centre half

Youth career
- 1911–1914: Wellington Town

Senior career*
Years	Team	Apps	(Gls)
1914–1918	Stalybridge Celtic		
1918–1922	Birmingham	34	(15)
1922–1923	Southampton	33	(7)
1923–1929	Tottenham Hotspur	190	(49)
1929–1933	Middlesbrough	105	(4)
1933–1934	Watford	9	(1)
1934–1935	Stafford Rangers		
1935–1937	Oakengates Town		
- * Club domestic league appearances and goals

Albert John "Jack" Elkes (31 December 1894 – 22 January 1972) was an English professional footballer who played as an inside left for various clubs between the two world wars.

== Playing career ==
Elkes was born in Snedshill, Oakengates, Shropshire, and played his youth football with Wellington Town before joining Stalybridge Celtic in 1914.

=== Birmingham ===
In January 1918 he joined Birmingham, making a few appearances for the club in the wartime leagues and scoring a winning goal which helped the club win their group of the 1919 Football League (Midland Section) subsidiary competition.

After the end of the First World War, he made his debut in the Second Division of the Football League on 27 September 1919, scoring two goals in a 4–2 defeat of Huddersfield Town. In 1919–20 he was mainly used as cover for the established inside-forwards, but still contributed eight goals in sixteen appearances. The following season injury, the arrival of Scottish international playmaker Johnny Crosbie and the form of former England player Harry Hampton, restricted Elkes to just two appearances as Birmingham took the Second Division title. He took advantage of Crosbie's unavailability at the start of the 1921–22 season to score six goals in the opening four fixtures. Though he kept his place for a couple of months, the goals dried up; he scored only once in twelve more games, making his last Birmingham appearance on Boxing Day 1921 before being transferred to Southampton in March 1922.

=== Southampton ===
At the time Southampton were leading the Third Division South table and their fans were confident of gaining promotion. Manager Jimmy McIntyre shocked them by announcing a four player transfer, with wingers Fred Foxall and Joe Barratt moving to Birmingham in exchange for Elkes and George Getgood (a half-back). The move was a success, however, as Southampton were able to claim the title by overtaking Plymouth Argyle on the final day of the season. Elkes was again unable to play a significant role in winning the title. He scored two goals on his debut on 4 March 1922 in a 5–0 victory over Southend United but broke his collar bone the following Saturday (also against Southend) which put him out for the rest of the season.

Elkes was described by Holley & Chalk in "The Alphabet of the Saints" as "a tall man, who was a clever player". He played 31 games with five goals in the following season as Southampton consolidated their place in Division Two, finishing in mid-table with the unusual record of: Played 42, won 14, drew 14, lost 14, goals for 40, goals against 40, points 42. They also had a run in the FA Cup, where they got through each of the first three rounds after replays (over First Division Newcastle United, Chelsea and Second Division Bury), before going out to West Ham United after a second replay. Elkes appeared in all nine FA Cup matches, scoring Saints' goal in the first match against West Ham.

=== Tottenham Hotspur ===
After one full season at The Dell he moved to Tottenham Hotspur for a fee of over £1000. He then spent six seasons at White Hart Lane alongside players such as Jimmy Seed, Frank Osborne and Charlie Handley. During his time at Spurs he made exactly 200 appearances, scoring 50 goals, including a hat-trick in a 5–0 victory over Blackburn Rovers on 15 November 1924. Elkes also won representative honours while with Spurs. Though four appearances in England trial matches proved unsuccessful, he toured Australia with the Football Association in 1925, played for the Football League XI on three occasions, and represented the Professionals against the Amateurs in the 1925 FA Charity Shield.

=== Middlesbrough and afterwards ===
In July 1929 he moved to Middlesbrough where he was switched to centre half, making 113 appearances (with four goals) in four seasons before, at the age of 38, joining Watford for the 1933–34 season.

He then moved back to his native Shropshire, spending one season with Stafford Rangers winding up his career with two years at Oakengates Town in the Birmingham & District League.

After his playing career came to an end, he coached the Ford Motor Works team at Dagenham.

== Honours ==
Southampton

- Football League Third Division South: 1921–22
