= Bill Stoddart =

English footballer

Personal information
- Full name: William Michael Stoddart
- Date of birth: 29 October 1907
- Place of birth: Medomsley, County Durham, England
- Date of death: 17 February 1972 (aged 64)
- Place of death: Medomsley, County Durham, England
- Height: 5 ft 9 in (1.75 m)
- Position: Centre-half

Youth career
- West Stanley

Senior career*
Years	Team	Apps	(Gls)
1926–1927	Manchester City	0	(0)
1927–1928	Coventry City	6	(1)
1928–1931	Southampton	12	(0)
1931–1933	Bristol Rovers	40	(0)
1933–1934	Accrington Stanley	31	(1)
1934–19??	Annfield Plain		
- * Club domestic league appearances and goals

William Michael Stoddart (29 October 1907 – 17 February 1972) was an English professional footballer who played at centre-half for various clubs in the 1920s and 1930s.

== Football career ==
Stoddart was born in Leadgate, County Durham and started his football career with local club, West Stanley. In March 1926, he joined Manchester City where he spent a year without breaking into the first team. He moved to Coventry City in May 1927 and made six appearances as Coventry struggled near the foot of the Football League Third Division South.

In June 1928, he moved to the south coast to join Second Division Southampton at the same time as goalkeeper Tommy Allen and outside-right Bill Henderson moved to Highfield Road. At The Dell, Stoddart was seen as cover for George Harkus and he never established himself as a first-team player. He spent most of his time in the reserves, for whom he made over 100 appearances in three years. His first-team debut came when he replaced Harkus as centre-half for the match at Wolverhampton Wanderers on 13 October 1928, which finished 1–1. Stoddart retained his place for the next match, and then made two further appearances in March 1929.

His only lengthy run in the side came in December 1929, when, after a run of four matches without a win, manager Arthur Chadwick made seven changes for the match at Reading. This match was drawn 1–1, but Stoddart retained his place for a further five matches before Harkus was recalled.

Stoddart's final appearances came in April 1930 and, after spending another year at the Saints without a further first-team appearance, he was placed on the transfer list in May 1931, moving to Bristol Rovers for a fee of £200 two months later.

Stoddart spent two seasons at Eastville in which he made 40 appearances in the Third Division South before winding up his Football League career with a year at Accrington Stanley.
