= Ken Boyes (footballer, born 1895) =

English footballer

Personal information
- Full name: Kenneth Cecil Boyes
- Date of birth: 17 November 1895
- Place of birth: Southampton, England
- Date of death: 6 October 1963 (aged 67)
- Place of death: Eastleigh, England
- Height: 5 ft 9 in (1.75 m)
- Position: Outside left

Senior career*
Years	Team	Apps	(Gls)
1914–1922	Southampton	8	(1)
1922–1923	Bristol Rovers	2	(0)
1923–1924	Poole		
1924–1925	Weymouth		
1925–1928	Southampton Civil Service		
1928–1940	Pirelli General		
- * Club domestic league appearances and goals

Kenneth Cecil Boyes (17 November 1895 – 6 October 1963) was an English footballer who played a small number of games as a professional for Southampton and Bristol Rovers in the era just after World War I, before a long career in local non-league football.

== Football career ==
Boyes was born in Southampton and on leaving school was a member of the Hampshire County Cricket Club's ground staff at the County Ground, Southampton.

In 1914, he was taken on by Southampton Football Club as an amateur, but failed to reach the first team before the outbreak of the First World War. In the war, Boyes enlisted with the 5th Battalion, Hampshire Regiment, alongside members of the staff at Hampshire. During the war, he represented his battalion at both cricket and football, and was also the regimental sprinting champion. At the end of the war, he returned to the "Saints" and was signed as a professional in October 1919. He made his first team debut, in a Southern League fixture at Reading, when he took the place of inside-left Jimmy Moore for two matches. In January, he made a further two appearances, this time at outside-left as a replacement for Fred Foxall.

In 1920 Southampton, along with most Southern League clubs, joined the new Football League Third Division, but Boyes was unable to get into the team past Moore and Foxall who were both ever-present as Saints finished their inaugural season in the Football League second in the table, missing out on the only available promotion place. Boyes eventually made his Football League debut as replacement for Foxall against Norwich City on 15 October 1921, followed by three games in April, this time replacing Henry Johnson.

In June 1922, Boyes was given a free transfer to Bristol Rovers where he made two first-team appearances before returning to the south coast, joining Poole for their first season in the Western League, followed by a season with Weymouth. In 1928, he became Pirelli General's groundsman at Dew Lane, Eastleigh; he continued to turn out for the club on occasions until 1940, but remained the groundsman until he retired in 1960.

== Family ==
His younger brother, Stuart was a cricketer who played over 500 matches for Hampshire County Cricket Club and the MCC between 1921 and 1939.
