= Harry Barratt =

English footballer and manager

Personal information
- Full name: Harold Barratt
- Date of birth: 25 December 1918
- Place of birth: Headington, England
- Date of death: 25 September 1989 (aged 70)
- Place of death: Coventry, England
- Height: 5 ft 9 1/2 in (1.77 m)
- Position: Utility player

Youth career
- –1935: Herberts Athletic

Senior career*
Years	Team	Apps	(Gls)
1935–1952	Coventry City	170	(12)
1936	→ Cheltenham Town (loan)		

Managerial career
- Rugby Town
- Snowdown Colliery Welfare
- 1958–1962: Gillingham
- * Club domestic league appearances and goals

Harold Barratt (25 December 1918 – 23 September 1989) was an English football player and manager.

Barratt played in the Football League for Coventry City as a utility player, making 170 appearances between 1938 and 1952. He managed Football League club Gillingham between 1958 and 1962.

== Early life ==
Barratt was born in Headington in 1918. He was the son of former Southampton player Joe Barratt.

== Playing career ==
Barratt played for Herberts Athletic before joining Coventry City in December 1935. He had a loan at Cheltenham Town in 1936. He made his debut for Coventry against Blackburn Rovers in April 1938, but only made five appearances before the outbreak of World War Two, and the suspension of the Football League. He joined the Royal Warwickshire Regiment at the start of the war and thus only appeared occasionally for Coventry City during the war. Following the war, Barratt became an important player for Coventry, scoring 27 goals in the 1945–46 season. He was club captain for Coventry in his last four years at the club, retiring due to a knee injury in early 1952. He was a utility player for Coventry, having played in nine different positions, including emergency goalkeeper. In total, he scored 12 goals in 170 games for the club.

== Managerial career ==
Barratt became club trainer at Coventry City following his retirement, and shortly afterwards took up managerial positions with Rugby Town and later with Snowdown Colliery Welfare, managing George Curtis, Alf Bentley and Eric Jones, who would all follow him to Coventry when he became Coventry chief scout in 1955.

Barratt served as Gillingham manager between 1958 and 1962. His best season was the 1959–60 season where the club finished 7th in the Fourth Division. He became secretary-manager of Tunbridge Wells in 1962. He would later become a coach for the British Crown Green Bowling Association.
