= Herbert Lock =

English footballer (1887-1957)

Personal information
- Date of birth: 21 January 1887
- Place of birth: Southampton, England
- Date of death: 16 March 1957 (aged 70)
- Place of death: Southampton, England
- Height: 5 ft 8 in (1.73 m)
- Position: Goalkeeper

Youth career
- St Mary's Guild

Senior career*
Years	Team	Apps	(Gls)
1907–1909	Southampton	55	(0)
1909–1921	Rangers	221	(0)
1921–1922	Queens Park Rangers	6	(0)
1922–1924	Southampton	11	(0)
1923–1924	Bournemouth & Boscombe Athletic	13	(0)
Total		306	(0)
- * Club domestic league appearances and goals

Herbert Lock (21 January 1887 – 16 March 1957) was an English professional goalkeeper who played for Southampton and Rangers in the early part of the twentieth century.

== Playing career ==
=== Southampton ===
Born in Southampton he played his early football for St. Mary's Guild before joining Southampton F.C. in the summer of 1907. He immediately forced himself into the first team, replacing George Clawley who had retired.

According to Holley & Chalk's "The Alphabet of the Saints" he was "a daring and acrobatic goalkeeper who was also noted for his uncanny anticipation when facing penalty kicks". He would pace up and down the goal line and eventually position himself slightly off-centre in the hope that the penalty taker would shoot towards the larger target. Lock would invariably anticipate correctly and would make the save. During the 1908–09 season he saved eight of the twelve penalty kicks he faced.

In the 1907–08 season he was the regular choice for goalkeeper and played an integral part in Saints' run to the FA Cup semi-final. In the 4th round match at Everton on 7 March his heroics helped Saints to a 0–0 draw, denying Sandy Young late in the game by saving bravely at his feet. In the replay at The Dell on 11 March Saints took a 2–1 lead at half-time which they extended thanks to a "magnificent" goal from Frank Costello. Despite Everton pulling a goal back shortly afterwards, Lock and the rest of the Saints defence managed to keep the Everton forwards at bay and the Saints ran out 3–2 victors.

Lock was unable to play in the semi-final against the eventual cup-winners Wolverhampton Wanderers as a result of a serious injury sustained on 14 March 1908 in a Southern League match at Watford's Cassio Road ground which put him out until the last fortnight of the season. The following season, he was once more the automatic choice for the 'keeper's shirt until he was again injured in the match at Cassio Road on 27 March 1909. Lock vowed never to play at Cassio Road again and ensured that this would not happen by moving to Scotland in the 1909 close season.

=== Rangers ===
In 1909 he moved to Glasgow to join Rangers where he was to become a mainstay of their championship winning sides over the next few years. He immediately became the first-choice 'keeper replacing Harry Rennie and in the 1909–10 season he played in all but two of Rangers' matches. The following season he was ever-present as Rangers took the title and in 1911–12 he only missed one league match as Rangers took the title for the third consecutive year. Thus, in his first three seasons, he only missed three out of a possible 112 league games.

He was considered to be on the reckless side, in terms of his own personal safety. A daring personality, he was expert at foiling forwards who had managed to run through on goal, leaving themselves "one on one" with the 'keeper. Invariably, just as the forward was about to shoot, Lock would throw himself at his feet to block the attempt. This recklessness resulted in several injuries during his career.

Injuries sustained in a Glasgow Cup match against Partick Thistle on 7 October 1912 put him out for the remainder of the season. He was replaced by John Hempsey and was unable to reclaim his No.1 jersey until 17 January 1914. On his return he kept clean sheets in seven of his first nine matches but the team missed out on the title to arch-rivals Celtic.

Over the next few years injuries, and war work in the Glasgow shipyards, meant that he was in and out of the team and it was not until the 1919–20 season that he was again able to play a full complement of matches. His form this season was blistering and he kept clean sheets in 20 of the 35 league games he played. This included a run of ten games without conceding a goal from 24 January to 20 March 1920 as Rangers once again took the title.

Although he remained at Rangers until August 1921, he failed to appear for the first team in 1920–21 and returned to England. In his twelve years with Rangers he made a total of 266 appearances, keeping a clean sheet in 109 of those matches – a rate of 41%.

=== Later career ===
His return to England took him to London where he joined Queens Park Rangers in August 1921. His stay at Loftus Road was short-lived and the following year he returned to Southampton where he acted as cover to Tommy Allen. He made his first appearance for Saints for 14 years on 14 March 1923 in the FA Cup Fourth Round replay against West Ham United at Upton Park after Allen was injured in the first match as he bravely thwarted Vic Watson. Although Lock acquitted himself well in the two replays, he was unable to prevent West Ham going through to the White Horse final at Wembley.

He retained his place for the remainder of the 1922–23 season but Allen regained the No. 1 jersey for the start of the following season. In January 1924 Lock moved along the south coast to join Bournemouth & Boscombe Athletic where he played to the end of the season before retiring aged 37.

He settled to live and work in Southampton as a carpenter and joiner on the Southern Railway. He died in Southampton on 16 March 1957 a few weeks after his 70th birthday.

== Career statistics ==
All-Time Club Performance
Club	Season	Domestic League		Domestic Cup^{1}		Other		Total
Club	Season	App	Clean sheets	App	Clean sheets	App	Clean sheets	App	Clean sheets	Percentage
Southampton	1907–08	23	8	5	3	0	0	28	11	39.29%
Southampton	1908–09	32	7	2	0	0	0	34	7	20.59%
Southampton	Total	55	15	7	3	0	0	62	18	29.03%
Rangers	1909–10	32	9	2	0	4	0	38	9	23.68%
Rangers	1910–11	34	13	3	1	6	2	43	16	37.21%
Rangers	1911–12	33	12	2	0	3	2	38	14	36.84%
Rangers	1912–13	6	3	0	0	2	1	8	4	50.00%
Rangers	1913–14	12	7	2	1	2	0	16	8	50.00%
Rangers	1914–15	26	9	0	0	1	0	27	9	33.33%
Rangers	1915–16	16	7	0	0	2	1	19	7	36.84%
Rangers	1916–17	16	8	0	0	2	1	18	9	50.00%
Rangers	1917–18	7	2	0	0	1	0	8	2	25.00%
Rangers	1918–19	4	3	0	0	4	2	8	5	62.50%
Rangers	1919–20	35	20	8	6	0	0	43	26	60.47%
Rangers	1920–21	0	0	0	0	0	0	0	0	0.00%
Rangers	Total	221	93	17	8	28	8	266	109	40.98%
Q.P.R.	1921–22	6	Not known	0	0	0	0	6	Not known	N/A
Q.P.R.	Total	6	Not known	0	0	0	0	6	Not known	N/A
Southampton	1922–23	11	5	2	0	0	0	13	5	38.46%
Southampton	Total	11	5	2	0	0	0	13	5	38.46%
Bournemouth & Boscombe Athletic	1923–24	13	Not known	2	0	0	0	15	Not known	N/A
Bournemouth & Boscombe Athletic	Total	13	Not known	0	0	0	0	15	Not known	N/A
Career Totals		306	113	28	11	28	8	362	132	38.71%^{2}

- ^{1} Includes all Domestic Cup competitions
- ^{2} Excludes Q.P.R. and Bournemouth

== Medal auction ==
On 9 August 2010, four medals won by Lock came up for auction. These included his Scottish championship medals for 1911–12 and 1919–20, the 1912 Glasgow Cup Medal and the Benevolent Pickford Fund Cup winners medal for 1923.

== Honours ==
Rangers

- Scottish League championship: 1910–11, 1911–12, 1919–20
- Glasgow Cup: 1909–10, 1910–11, 1911–12
- Glasgow Merchants Charity Cup: 1910–11, 1918–19
