= Joe Clark (footballer, born 1890) =

English footballer

Personal information
- Full name: Joseph Walter Clark
- Date of birth: 15 February 1890
- Place of birth: Willington Quay, England
- Date of death: 1960 (aged 69–70)
- Height: 5 ft 8 in (1.73 m)
- Position: Outside left

Youth career
- Wallsend Park Villa

Senior career*
Years	Team	Apps	(Gls)
- Hebburn Argyle
1913–1921	Cardiff City	26	(6)
1921–1922	Aberaman Athletic		
1922–1923	Southampton	20	(0)
1923–1924	Rochdale	16	(1)
1924–1928	Norwich City		
1928–1929	Exeter City		
1929–1930	Aldershot		
- * Club domestic league appearances and goals

Joseph Walter Clark (15 February 1890 – 1960) was an English professional footballer who played as an outside forward for Cardiff City, Southampton and Rochdale in the 1920s.

== Football career ==
Clark was born in Willington Quay on Tyneside and played his early football with Wallsend Park Villa and Hebburn Argyle.

In May 1913 he joined Welsh club, Cardiff City, remaining on their books until after the First World War. In 1921 he was part of the Cardiff City side which reached the semi-finals of the FA Cup, going out to Wolverhampton Wanderers in a replay. During the cup run, Cardiff (then in the Second Division) defeated First Division sides Sunderland and Chelsea.

Clark then spent a season in the Welsh section of the Southern League with Aberaman Athletic. In May 1922, Southampton were looking for an outside left to replace Fred Foxall, who had left the previous March. Clark had impressed the Saints' directors in the FA Cup match between the two sides in February 1921 and moved to the south coast. He made his debut in a 0–0 draw at South Shields on 26 August 1922 and retained his place until late December, when he was replaced by Len Andrews.

Clark was placed on the transfer list in the summer of 1923 at a fee of £100, but was eventually given a free transfer to Rochdale before moving on to Norwich City, Exeter City and Aldershot.
