= Alastair Campbell (sportsman) =

English cricketer, footballer, and football manager

Personal information
- Full name: Alastair Keyon Campbell
- Date of birth: 29 May 1890
- Place of birth: Southampton, Hampshire, England
- Date of death: 16 June 1943 (aged 53)
- Place of death: Cosham, Hampshire, England
- Height: 6 ft 2 in (1.88 m)
- Position: Centre-half

Youth career
- King Edward VI School

Senior career*
| Years | Team | Apps | (Gls) |
| 1908–1909 | Southampton | 3 | (0) |
| 1909–1914 | Glossop North End | 10 | (0) |
| 1914 | Boscombe | ? | (?) |
| 1919–1926 | Southampton | 196 | (15) |
| 1926–1927 | Poole Town | ? | (?) |

International career
| | England amateur | 1 | (0) |

Managerial career
- 1927: Chesterfield
- Cricket career
Cricket information
- Batting: Right-handed
Domestic team information
- Years: Team
- 1908–1909: Hampshire
Career statistics
| Competition | First-class |
|---|---|
| Matches | 7 |
| Runs scored | 91 |
| Batting average | 9.10 |
| 100s/50s | –/– |
| Top score | 21 |
| Catches/stumpings | 1/– |
- Source: Alastair Campbell at Cricinfo
- * Club domestic league appearances and goals

Alastair Keyon "Alec" Campbell (29 May 1890 — 16 June 1943) was a professional cricketer and footballer who played as a centre-half in nearly 200 games for Southampton in 196 appearances eitherside of the First World War, before briefly becoming manager at Chesterfield from April to December 1927. Whilst a schoolboy, he played for England at amateur level in an international match. As a first-class cricketer, he played two seasons for Hampshire in 1908 and 1909.

== Early life ==
Campbell was born at South Stoneham to Scottish parents in May 1890, with his father being a noted sailor in Southampton. He was educated in Southampton at the King Edward VI Grammar School, where he was captain of both the football and cricket elevens. While at school he played for England at amateur level in an international against the Netherlands, the only known occasion that a schoolboy has represented his country at that level.

== Sporting career ==
=== Cricket ===
Campbell played first-class cricket for Hampshire, making his debut in the 1908 County Championship against Northamptonshire at Northampton, with him making a further appearance in 1908 against Gloucestershire at Cheltenham. The following season, he made a further five appearances in the 1909 County Championship. In seven first-class matches, he scored 91 runs at an average of 9.10, with a highest score of 21.

=== Football ===
==== Pre-war football ====
Campbell was spotted by Southampton, with him joining the club in 1908. He made his professional debut in a Southern League match at Millwall on 27 February 1909, as a replacement for Bert Trueman. He "quickly emerged as one of the club's brightest-ever prospects". Two further appearances for Southampton followed, before he was persuaded to join Samuel Hill-Wood's team at Glossop North End in September 1909, together with several other amateur internationals. He remained at Glossop until January 1914, making ten appearances. He then returned to Southampton, when he was offered employment as district manager of the Hyde Abbey Brewery. Upon his return, he resigned for Southampton as an amateur, but turned professional a month later and subsequently signed for Hampshire League side Boscombe before the outbreak of the First World War.

==== Wartime service and football ====
With the outbreak of the First World War, Campbell's football career was interrupted. He served in the British Army during the war, joining the Artists Rifles. In March 1918, he gained a commission as a second lieutenant with the Royal Garrison Artillery, having attended the Artillery Cadet School. During the war he guested for West Ham United as well as turning out regularly for Southampton. Although he was offered terms to join West Ham at the end of the war, he decided to stay in Southampton, where he had been offered a directorship with a firm of fruit importers.

==== Return to Southampton ====
After regular football had restarted in 1919, Campbell returned to play for Southampton. Early in the 1919–20 season, he lost his place to George Bradburn, before regaining it in March for the remainder of the season, and being appointed team captain. At 6 ft 2 in (1.88 m) he was a distinctive figure on the pitch with his "telescopic legs", who according to Holley and Chalk was "undoubtedly one of the club's best-ever centre-halves" During the management of Jimmy McIntyre when Southampton were admitted into Division 3 of the Football League for the 1920–21 season. Under his captaincy and McIntyre's management, Southampton just missed out on promotion in their first season, but a year later the pair had successfully guided Southampton into Division Two as champions of the Football League Division 3 (South), having gained promotion by having a superior goal difference to Plymouth Argyle. During his second spell at Southampton, he made 196 appearances and scored fifteen goals.

==== Poole Town ====
Campbell remained with Southampton until the end of the 1925–26 season, when, now aged 36, he joined Poole Town. Poole had just turned professional and joined the Southern League, Eastern Division. Although only placed 14th out of 17 sides in 1926–27, the season was distinguished by an excellent FA Cup run; Poole defeated Third Division (South) side Newport County 1–0 in the first round, followed by a 2–1 away victory against Isthmian League side Nunhead in the second round. In the third round, Poole met First Division Everton in front of 65,000 at Goodison Park, where they were beaten 3–1 by a Dixie Dean hat-trick. Campbell ended his playing career with Poole.

== Management career and later life ==
In April 1927 Campbell was appointed manager at Chesterfield, remaining only until December. In his 25 games in charge, Chesterfield picked up nine victories with eleven defeats. While manager at Chesterfield, he was engaged as a club cricketer. After leaving Chesterfield he quit football entirely. Returning to Southampton, Campbell was declared bankrupt the following year when the fruit importing business in which he held a directorship had unwisely invested in Brazilian bananas. Campbell served as an emergency commission in the Royal Artillery during the Second World War, holding the rank of lieutenant. He fell ill in 1942, spending time in the Belfast Military Hospital. Given a few months to live, he returned to England, where he died of pneumonia at the Queen Alexandra Hospital in Cosham in June 1943. Having been cremated at Southampton Crematorium, he is commemorated on the war memorial at South Stoneham Garden of Rest.

== Honours ==
As a player for Southampton

- Football League Third Division South Champions: 1921–22

== Works cited ==
- Holley, Duncan; Chalk, Gary (1992). The Alphabet of the Saints. Leicester: ACL & Polar Publishing. ISBN 0951486233.
- McCrery, Nigel (2023). Season in Hell: British Footballers Killed in the Second World War. Barnsley: Pen and Sword Books. ISBN 9781526715951.
