= George Bradburn (footballer) =

English footballer

Personal information
- Full name: George Bradburn
- Date of birth: 1894
- Place of birth: Wolverhampton, Staffordshire, England
- Date of death: 1975 (aged 80–81)
- Place of death: Walsall, West Midlands, England
- Height: 5 ft 10 in (1.78 m)
- Position: Centre-half

Senior career*
Years	Team	Apps	(Gls)
1914–1915	Walsall	0	(0)
1919–1922	Southampton	34	(0)
1922–1923	Walsall	12	(0)
- * Club domestic league appearances and goals

George Bradburn (1894–1975) was an English footballer who played as a centre-half for Southampton and Walsall in the years immediately after World War I.

== Football career ==
Bradburn was born in Wolverhampton and was on the books of Walsall in the immediate pre-war period. During the war, he moved to Southern England and was employed at the Whitehead Torpedo Works in Weymouth, Dorset. He played in the Garrison League throughout the war and also made one guest appearance for Southampton in 1917.

At the end of the war, he returned to Walsall before signing for Southampton in May 1919. Described as a "strong, rugged centre-half", Bradburn displaced Alec Campbell at centre-half on the restart of League football in 1919, making 28 appearances in the Southern League, before Campbell regained his place in March. Under manager Jimmy McIntyre Saints were admitted into Division 3 of the Football League in 1920; Campbell had by now been re-established as the first choice centre-half, with George Moorhead in reserve, and Bradburn spent the next two seasons mainly playing reserve-team football, only making six appearances for Southampton in the Football League.

In 1922, Bradburn was given a free transfer back to Walsall, for whom he made 12 appearances in the Football League Third Division North before his career came to an end.
