= George Getgood =

Scottish footballer (1892-1970)

Personal information
- Full name: George Getgood
- Date of birth: 15 November 1892
- Place of birth: Coylton, Ayrshire, Scotland
- Date of death: 22 July 1970 (aged 77)
- Place of death: Kidderminster, England
- Height: 5 ft 8 in (1.73 m)
- Position: Half-back

Senior career*
Years	Team	Apps	(Gls)
–1912	Ayr Seaside		
1912–1914	Ayr United	0	(0)
1914–1915	Reading		
1915–1916	Ayr United	13	(1)
1920–1921	Reading	36	(1)
1921	Willenhall Swifts		
1921	Birmingham	10	(0)
1921–1922	Southampton	35	(1)
1922–1925	Wolverhampton Wanderers	55	(1)
1925–1926	Kidderminster Harriers		
1926	Aberdare Athletic	5	(0)
1926–1927	Shrewsbury Town		
1927	Gala Fairydean Rovers		
1927–1928	Bathgate		
1928–1929	Bo'ness		
1929–	Nuneaton Town		
1931–19??	Midland Red Sports		
- * Club domestic league appearances and goals

George Getgood (15 November 1892 – 22 July 1970), also known as George Goodman, was a Scottish professional footballer who played as a half-back for various clubs in the 1920s.

== Playing career ==
Getgood was born in Coylton, Ayrshire. He joined local side Ayr United in 1912 before moving to England to join Reading in the Southern League in July 1914. Immediately on joining Reading his football career was interrupted by the First World War. During the war he served with the Royal Scots Fusiliers before joining the Royal Army Medical Corps in April 1916. After the cessation he returned to Reading in time for their first season in the Football League Third Division. While on the books of Reading he was known as George Goodman, and he made a total of 40 appearances, scoring once.

He had acquired a reputation for strong tackling, and in August 1921 Birmingham signed him to strengthen their newly promoted side; he played ten First Division games at right half but did not settle, and transferred to Southampton in March 1922.

At the time Southampton were leading the Third Division South table and their fans were confident of gaining promotion. Manager Jimmy McIntyre shocked them by announcing a four-player transfer: wingers Fred Foxall and Joe Barratt were to join Birmingham in exchange for Jack Elkes (a forward) and Getgood. The move was a success, however, as Southampton were able to claim the title by overtaking Plymouth Argyle on the final day of the season.

Described by Holley & Chalk as "an accomplished and versatile player, whose best position was at centre-half", he failed to settle on the south coast and continued to live in Birmingham.

In February 1923 he returned to the Midlands to join Wolverhampton Wanderers, with Bill McCall moving in the opposite direction as part of an exchange deal. At the end of the 1922–23 season Wolves were relegated to the Third Division North but returned to the Second Division in 1924 as champions. After making 59 appearances for Wolves, he spent a season with Kidderminster Harriers, before moving to Aberdare Athletic for a few months during their final season in the Football League.

== Later career ==
Getgood was the licensee of the Great Western Hotel in Bewdley before returning to Scotland, where he appeared for Second Division sides Bathgate and Bo'ness. He then came back again to the Midlands where he took a job as a bus conductor and turned out for Nuneaton Town and his works team Midland Red Sports. He later worked as a porter in Worcester. He died in Kidderminster on 22 July 1970 aged 77.

== Honours ==
Southampton

- Football League Third Division South champions: 1921–22

Wolverhampton Wanderers

- Football League Third Division North champions: 1923–24
