= Tommy Allen (footballer, born 1897) =

English footballer (1897–1968)

Personal information
- Full name: Thomas Allen
- Date of birth: 1 May 1897
- Place of birth: Moxley, England
- Date of death: 10 May 1968 (aged 71)
- Place of death: Walsall, England
- Height: 6 ft 1 in (1.85 m)
- Position: Goalkeeper

Youth career
- Wednesday Old Park Works
- Bilston United
- Hickman's Institute
- Wolverhampton Wanderers (wartime)

Senior career*
Years	Team	Apps	(Gls)
1919–1920	Sunderland	19	(0)
1920–1928	Southampton	291	(0)
1928–1932	Coventry City	154	(0)
1932–1933	Accrington Stanley	35	(0)
1933–1934	Northampton Town	19	(0)
1934–1936	Kidderminster Harriers		
1936–1938	Cradley Heath		
- * Club domestic league appearances and goals

Thomas Allen (1 May 1897 – 10 May 1968) was an English professional goalkeeper who played for Southampton in the 1920s and later for Coventry City.

== Playing career ==
=== Early career ===
He was born in Moxley and played his youth football for various local sides including Bilston United. During World War I he played for Wolverhampton Wanderers before joining First Division side Sunderland in May 1919. At Roker Park he was seen as a fine prospect and during Sunderland's first post-war season he vied for the 'keeper's shirt with Leslie Scott and James Dempster, making 19 league appearances. At the end of the season the Sunderland management failed to include his name on the list of players retained for the following season and he was quickly snapped up by Southampton for their first Football League season.

=== Southampton ===
He soon became the backbone of The Saints' defence and in his first season Southampton narrowly missed out on promotion. In the 1921–22 season he kept 26 clean sheets as Southampton took the Division Three South title on goal average from Plymouth Argyle. Saints total of only 21 goals conceded in a 42 match season was a Football League record which stood until 1979 and remains a record for Southampton. Allen did not concede a goal in any of the final seven games of the season and by the time his defence was finally breached by Leeds United on 28 August 1922 he had gone 845 minutes without conceding a goal.

He was a tall, slightly built man and according to Holley & Chalk's "Alphabet of the Saints" "his agility was often described as miraculous". His slender build was frequently the target of banter in the dressing room; players in the bath would cry out in mock alarm: "Look out, the plug's pulled – we don't want to lose Tom down the drain!"

Saints struggled to make any impact in the Second Division but enjoyed some exciting runs in the FA Cup. In 1923 they got through each of the first three rounds after replays (over First Division Newcastle United, Chelsea and Second division Bury), before going out to West Ham United after a second replay. In the first Fourth Round match against West Ham at The Dell Allen was injured as he bravely thwarted Vic Watson and was replaced in the replays by veteran 'keeper Herbert Lock.

In 1925 the Saints defeated Liverpool 1–0 in Round Four to reach the semi-final where they came up against another First Division side, Sheffield United. In the match played at Stamford Bridge on 28 March 1925, Saints' defender Tom Parker had a dreadful afternoon, first scoring an own-goal, then suffering a rare miss from the penalty spot (shooting straight at the 'keeper) before a mix-up between him and goalkeeper Allen gave Sheffield their second goal.

Southampton were again drawn against Liverpool in the third round of the FA Cup in January 1926. In the first match, at The Dell, Allen collided with his teammate Michael Keeping and had to leave the pitch with bruised ribs. Arthur Bradford took over in goal for the remainder of the match, which ended goalless. For the replay (lost 1–0), Allen was replaced by Len Hill, who kept his place until Allen returned to the team at the end of February.

In 1927 Saints again reached the semi-final defeating Newcastle United on the way. In the semi-final match, played at Stamford Bridge on 26 March 1927, Saints were eliminated 2–1 by Arsenal with Saints' goal coming from Bill Rawlings. In this match, Saints came up against their former star full-back Tom Parker who had had a nightmare in Saints' previous semi-final appearance two years earlier. This time Parker was on the winning side as Arsenal moved on to Wembley, losing to Cardiff City in the final.

In the early part of the 1927–28 season, Allen was injured and new signing George Thompson took over for eight matches, before Allen's return to fitness in November. In June 1928, Allen moved on to Coventry City at the same time as Bill Henderson, with Bill Stoddart moving the other way in exchange. In his eight seasons with the Saints he made 323 (291 League, 32 Cup) appearances, which remains a club record for a goalkeeper.

=== Later career ===
After four seasons at Coventry City, he signed for Accrington Stanley, where he spent the 1932–33 season. Now aged 36 he was nearing his 500th League game, a milestone he reached in his first game with next club, Northampton Town, where he remained for the 1933–34 season. This was followed by three years with Kidderminster Harriers and a spell at Cradley Heath.

He retired from football in 1938, after which he settled in his home town of Moxley; he died in Walsall on 10 May 1968 shortly after his 71st birthday.

== Honours ==
Southampton

- Football League Third Division South championship: 1921–22
