= Robert Blyth (footballer) =

Scottish footballer (1900–1956)

Personal information
- Full name: Robert Roberts Taylor Blyth
- Date of birth: 2 June 1900
- Place of birth: Muirkirk, Scotland
- Date of death: 1956 (aged 55–56)
- Place of death: Southwark, England
- Position: Forward

Senior career*
Years	Team	Apps	(Gls)
1921–1922	Portsmouth	8	(2)
1922–1923	Southampton	8	(0)
1924–1925	Boston Soccer Club	2	(1)
- * Club domestic league appearances and goals

Robert Roberts Taylor Blyth (2 June 1900 – 1956) was a Scottish professional footballer in the 1920s.

== Football career ==
Blyth was born in Muirkirk Scotland – his father was the Portsmouth player Bob Blyth, who went on to manage Portsmouth from 1901 to 1904 and his cousins included Bill Shankly and Bob Shankly.

He made eight appearances for Portsmouth in the 1921–22 season before joining Southampton in January 1922. He again only made eight appearances for the "Saints", replacing Charlie Brown, before leaving the club for a brief football career in the United States.

In 1924, he signed with the Boston Soccer Club of the American Soccer League, but saw time in only two games.
