= John Horton (footballer) =

English footballer (1901–1970)

Personal information
- Full name: John William Horton
- Date of birth: 5 January 1901
- Place of birth: Rotherham, England
- Date of death: 1970
- Height: 5 ft 9 in (1.75 m)
- Position: Centre forward

Senior career*
Years	Team	Apps	(Gls)
19??–1921	Wombwell		
1921–1922	Southampton	1	(0)
- * Club domestic league appearances and goals

John William Horton (5 January 1901 – 1970) was an English professional footballer who made one Football League appearance for Southampton in 1921.

== Football career ==
Horton was born in Thurnscoe, near Barnsley in Yorkshire and first came to attention when he played for Wombwell. In 1920–21 he scored a total of 40 goals, helping Wombwell to reach second place in the Yorkshire League and gain admittance to the Midland League.

In May 1921, he was signed by Southampton, then playing in the Football League Third Division South. He scored regularly for the reserve team and made his first-team debut when he replaced Bill Rawlings for the match against Watford on 29 October 1921, which ended in a 2–0 victory for the Saints. Shortly after his debut, he broke a leg in a reserve team match at Bristol City, which ended his professional football career.
