= Sammy Meston =

English footballer

Personal information
- Full name: Samuel William Meston
- Date of birth: 30 May 1902
- Place of birth: Southampton, England
- Date of death: 12 October 1953 (aged 51)
- Place of death: Woolston, Southampton, England
- Height: 5 ft 8 in (1.73 m)
- Position: Winger

Youth career
- 1921–1922: Sholing Athletic

Senior career*
Years	Team	Apps	(Gls)
1922–1926	Southampton	10	(2)
1926–1928	Gillingham	61	(8)
1928–1929	Everton	1	(0)
1929–1932	Tranmere Rovers	107	(29)
1932–19??	Newport (IOW)		
- * Club domestic league appearances and goals

Samuel William Meston (30 May 1902 – 12 October 1953) was a professional footballer who played as a winger for Tranmere Rovers as well as for Southampton, Gillingham and Everton.

== Playing career ==
He was the son of a former Southampton player Samuel Meston and was a coppersmith by trade. He joined Southampton in January 1922 and made his debut at home to Merthyr Town on 8 April as a centre-forward in place of the injured Bill Rawlings. He made a solitary appearance the following season before converting to the right-wing position. He started the 1923–24 season on the wing in place of Charlie Brown and scored twice in his third match at home to Bury on 1 September 1923. He was just beginning to establish himself and was looking capable of emulating his father's career when his career was interrupted by a broken leg sustained in a match against Bristol City on 6 October. The injury kept him out for a year but, before he could get back into the first team, he broke the same leg again. Although he fully recovered from his injuries, he was never the same player again and after one final come-back match (against Chelsea on 5 April 1926) he moved to Gillingham.

He spent two seasons with Gillingham in the Third Division South before, rather surprisingly, joining First Division Everton in March 1928. He only managed one game for Everton in their 1927–28 championship season (where he played alongside the legendary Dixie Dean) before crossing the Mersey in July 1929 to join Tranmere Rovers in the Third Division North. After three seasons at Prenton Park he returned south in 1931.

He turned out occasionally for Newport (Isle of Wight), but took up employment as a "bookie's runner" before he died of a heart attack in October 1953 aged 51.
