= Fred Foxall =

English footballer (1898-1926)

Personal information
- Full name: Frederick Howard Foxall
- Date of birth: 2 April 1898
- Place of birth: Stourbridge, England
- Date of death: 17 June 1926 (aged 28)
- Place of death: Smethwick, England
- Height: 5 ft 10 in (1.78 m)
- Position: Outside left

Senior career*
Years	Team	Apps	(Gls)
1914–1916	Aston Villa	0	(0)
1916–1919	Blackheath Town		
1919–1922	Southampton	105	(12)
1922–1923	Birmingham	28	(4)
1923–1924	Watford	32	(2)
- * Club domestic league appearances and goals

Frederick Howard Foxall (2 April 1898 – 17 June 1926) was an English professional footballer who played as an outside left for various clubs in the 1920s.

== Playing career ==
Foxall was born in Stourbridge, and signed for Aston Villa in 1914, but was prevented from making any first team appearances as a result of the First World War. At the end of the war he was playing for Blackheath Town at Coventry when he was spotted by Jimmy McIntyre, then Southampton's trainer, who invited him for a trial at The Dell. He was signed by the "Saints" in time for the first post-war season in the Southern League, where he was joined by his Blackheath teammate, Reg Hackett.

Foxall immediately made the outside-left position his own and was an excellent winger. According to Holley & Chalk "his well placed centres from varying angles were a strong feature of his repertoire" In 1920 Southampton, along with most Southern League clubs, joined the new Football League Third Division and Foxall was ever-present as Saints finished their inaugural season in the Football League second in the table, missing out on the only available promotion place.

At the end of the season, he provoked controversy when he signed a contract with Aston Villa, although he was still registered with Southampton. He was ordered by the Football Association to re-join Southampton and he continued to give good service until he was transferred to Birmingham in March 1922. At the time Southampton were leading the Third Division South table and their fans were confident of gaining promotion. Manager Jimmy McIntyre shocked them by announcing a four player transfer, with wingers Foxall and Joe Barratt moving to Birmingham in exchange for Jack Elkes (a forward) and George Getgood (a half-back). In his three years at The Dell Foxall made 114 appearances in all competitions, scoring 12 goals.

Foxall missed only one First Division game for Birmingham in what remained of 1921–22, but illness and injury restricted his first full season with the club to 17 appearances, and he joined Watford in June 1923. After 35 appearances for Watford he broke a leg, forcing him to retire completely. He never fully recovered and his death two years later, on 17 June 1926 in Smethwick, was brought about by complications arising from the injury.

== Honours ==
Southampton

- Football League Third Division South champions: 1921–22
