= Arthur Dominy =

English footballer and manager (1893-1974)

Personal information
- Full name: Arthur Albert Dominy
- Date of birth: 11 February 1893
- Place of birth: South Stoneham, Southampton, England
- Date of death: 23 September 1974 (aged 81)
- Place of death: Mitcham, England
- Height: 5 ft 8 in (1.73 m)
- Position: Inside forward

Youth career
- Weston Grove
- Peartree Athletic
- 1911–1912: Bitterne Guild

Senior career*
Years	Team	Apps	(Gls)
1912–1913	Woolston		
1913–1926	Southampton	334	(133)
1926–1928	Everton	29	(12)
1928–1929	Gillingham	55	(17)
1929–1930	Clapton Orient	5	(1)
1931–19??	Newport (IOW)		

Managerial career
- 1943–1946: Southampton
- * Club domestic league appearances and goals

Arthur Albert Dominy (11 February 1893 – 23 September 1974) was an English professional footballer, who played as an inside-forward, and football manager, spending most of his career with Southampton.

== Playing career ==
=== Southampton ===
He played his early football for Peartree Green, then for Bitterne Guild for whom he scored over 50 goals during the 1911–12 season. This form soon attracted the attention of Southern League Southampton who signed him in March 1913, and he made his first appearance away to Stoke City on 5 April 1913. He made two further appearances that month, including scoring two goals in the final match, a 3–3 draw at home to Gillingham on 26 April, thus giving Saints fans some indication of what was to come.

He made an immediate impact in the following season by becoming Saints' top scorer (with 13 goals) playing alongside Len Andrews, Percy Prince and Sid Kimpton. He followed this up with a spectacular 30 goals the following season, including a hat-trick in a 3–4 defeat at Gillingham on 3 April 1915, making him the leading scorer in the Southern League.

According to Holley & Chalk's The Alphabet of the Saints, Dominy's

"ball control was second to none; he always managed to keep the ball near his feet, rarely allowing it to break away, and he always had the priceless ability, for a forward, of being able to beat an opponent at close quarters."

His career was then interrupted by World War I. Before becoming a professional footballer he had trained as a boiler-maker; during the war he was employed at the local Harland & Wolff shipyard, where he played football for the works team as well as making guest appearances for Southampton, Arsenal and Rangers.

After the end of hostilities, Dominy returned to a full-time football career in 1919, and soon formed a formidable striking partnership with Bill Rawlings, as manager Jimmy McIntyre set about building a team for the future. In Saints' final season in the Southern League, Dominy scored 20 goals (to Rawlings' 19), including a hat-trick in a 5–1 victory at home to Crystal Palace on 13 March 1919. Dominy was selected to play for the Southern League against the Irish League and was attracting the attention of First Division clubs, attracting bids from Manchester United and Everton. Although Dominy took part in many England trial matches, he was never capped. To many people this was a surprise as he was "not only a player of outstanding ability, but an inspirational captain."

Saints were admitted into Division 3 of the Football League in 1920, and just missed out on promotion in their first season, with Dominy contributing 12 goals (to Rawlings' 18). A year later, McIntyre had successfully guided Southampton into Division Two, finishing equal on points with Plymouth Argyle and taking the title on goal average, helped in no small manner by 5–0 victories over Southend United and Newport County, a 6–0 defeat of Charlton Athletic and an 8–0 hammering of Northampton Town on 24 December 1921 (which is still Saints' biggest win in the Football League). In each of these matches Dominy scored twice, with a total of 13 goals at the end of the season, when he was rewarded with a benefit match against Preston North End, won 3–1 by Saints.

Over the next four seasons, Saints consolidated their place in Division 2, generally finishing in the upper half of the table with Dominy again top scorer in 1922–23 (with 13 goals). Saints also had a run in the FA Cup, where they got through each of the first three rounds after replays (over First Division Newcastle United, Chelsea and Second division Bury), before going out to West Ham United after a second replay.

Dominy's long playing career with the Saints eventually ended in 1926, when he was given a free transfer to Everton. His Saints' career spanned thirteen years, during which he made 369 appearances (excluding war-time matches) scoring 146 goals.

=== After Southampton ===
He joined Everton in May 1926 and soon formed a useful partnership (and friendship) with Dixie Dean and in his first season he scored 12 goals in 28 league appearances (to Dean's 21) as Everton narrowly avoided relegation from the First Division. In the following season, he only made one appearance as Everton claimed the League championship with Dean contributing 60 of the team's 102 league goals.

Age was now against Dominy and in March 1928 (now aged 35) he moved on to Third Division (South) side Gillingham. He made 14 appearances (with 3 goals) in the 1927–28 season, followed up with 14 goals in 1928–29 (making him the club's top scorer for the season), as Gillingham finished at the bottom of the table and were forced to seek re-election to the league. He then completed his league playing career with a season at fellow Third Division (South) side Clapton Orient.

After retiring from league football, he returned to Southampton and became a licensee at the Mason's Arms in St. Mary's Street, whilst playing occasionally for Newport (Isle of Wight), often playing alongside his former Saints' partner, Bill Rawlings.

== Coaching and management career ==
During the 1930s he also was a scout for Southampton and helped out at the local Itchen Sports team and running a sports stadium in Bournemouth. In 1934 he was offered the position as manager at Le Havre AC in France but turned this down, choosing to stay in Southampton.

In 1943, following the sudden resignation of Tom Parker as manager at Southampton, Dominy was approached by the board and asked to take on the position for the duration of the war. The position was only part-time, but Dominy gave valuable assistance until the appointment of Bill Dodgin in January 1946 in time for the resumption of league football later that year. With no training facilities at The Dell during the war, the only time Dominy saw the side was on match days.

== After retirement ==
After handing over the role of manager to Bill Dodgin, Dominy remained at The Dell, as chief steward at the Saints supporters club, thus maintaining strong links with Southampton until his death in 1974, aged 81.

== Honours ==
=== As a player ===
Southampton

- Football League Third Division South – Championship 1921–22
