= Jimmy McIntyre =

English football manager (1881–1954)

Personal information
- Full name: James Alfred McIntyre
- Date of birth: 31 October 1878
- Place of birth: Wednesbury, Staffordshire, England
- Date of death: 1954 (aged 75–76)

Team information
- Current team: Inside forward

Senior career*
Years	Team	Apps	(Gls)
- Witton Albion
- Darlaston Town
- Wednesbury Old Athletic
1901–1902	Walsall		
1902–1903	Notts County	9	(3)
1903–1905	Reading		
1905–1906	Coventry City		

Managerial career
- 1919–1924: Southampton
- 1928–1931: Coventry City
- 1931–1934: Fulham
- * Club domestic league appearances and goals

James Alfred McIntyre (31 October 1878 – 1954) was an English footballer who became manager at Southampton, Coventry City and Fulham.

== Playing career ==
McIntyre was born in Wednesbury, Staffordshire. He was a journeyman player of some repute, playing as an inside-forward, and had spells with West Midlands teams Witton Albion, Darlaston Town and Wednesbury Old Athletic. In 1901, he joined Walsall (his home-town club), before spending the 1902–03 season in the First Division at Notts County. He then had a spell at Reading before joining Coventry City as a player in 1905, where he scored hat-tricks in his second and third games for the club.

After his playing days were over he worked at the Humber car factory in Coventry and spent one season refereeing in the Coventry & North Warwickshire League, also turning out for Dudley & Bournbrook, before returning to Coventry City as an assistant trainer in 1907. Within one season he was promoted to chief trainer and his initial association with Coventry lasted seven years, during which time he produced a number of young players for their Southern League team.

== Managerial career ==
=== Southampton ===
His success at Coventry impressed the directors at Southampton, where George Swift had resigned and they secured his services in April 1912.

Engaged as trainer, under secretary Er Arnfield who acted as "manager", McIntyre faced the difficult task of restoring the Saints to their former success in the Southern League. Due to the lack of funds following Swift's spending spree in the previous season, McIntyre was only able to sign three new players; the only successful recruit was Len Andrews, whose signing from Reading was "one of the best moves of McIntyre's managerial career" as Andrews went on to become the "Saints" most consistent forward in the three seasons leading up to the First World War, as well as being an expert penalty taker. Saints gradually began to improve their League position but with the outbreak of war in 1914 and the abandonment of League football in April 1915, all progress came to a halt.

McIntyre returned to Coventry for the duration of the war, working in a munitions factory. With the resumption of League football in 1919 he returned to The Dell, this time as team manager and, with practically a new squad, he set about building a team for the future.

Saints were admitted into Division 3 of the Football League in 1920, and just missed out on promotion in their first season, but in 1922 McIntyre successfully guided Southampton into Division Two. Saints finished equal on points with Plymouth Argyle and took the title on goal average, helped in no small manner by 5–0 victories over Southend United and Newport County, a 6–0 defeat of Charlton Athletic and an 8–0 hammering of Northampton Town on 24 December 1921 (which is still Saints' biggest win in the Football League). In each of these matches Arthur Dominy scored twice, whilst Bill Rawlings scored three against Charlton and put four past Northampton, on his way to becoming top scorer for the season, contributing 30 of the team's 68 league goals. Saints total of only 21 goals conceded in a 42 match season was a Football League record which stood until 1979 and remains a record for Southampton. Goalkeeper Tommy Allen did not concede a goal in any of the final seven games of the season (five wins and two draws) and by the time the defence was finally breached by Leeds United on 28 August 1922 he had gone 845 minutes without conceding a goal.

In March 1922, just as Saints fans were confident of gaining promotion, McIntyre shocked them by announcing a four player transfer with wingers Fred Foxall and Joe Barratt moving to Birmingham in exchange for Jack Elkes (a forward) and George Getgood (a half-back). The move was a success, however, as Southampton were able to claim the title by overtaking Plymouth Argyle on the final day of the season.

In their first season in Division 2, Saints started badly, with two draws and four defeats in the first six games (failing to score in the first five games), but Saints rallied and finished mid-table in Division 2, with the unusual record of: Played 42, won 14, drew 14, lost 14, goals for 40, goals against 40, points 42. They also had a run in the FA Cup, where they got through each of the first three rounds after replays (over First Division Newcastle United, Chelsea and Second division Bury), before going out to West Ham United after a second replay.

In the 1923–24 season, Saints were starting to find their feet in Division 2 and only missed out on promotion by three points, with Rawlings again top scorer with 19 league goals.

The following season was frustrating for the Saints who seemed to have lost the ability to score goals and, in December 1924 McIntyre suddenly resigned as manager and moved to Edinburgh to run an hotel. His departure took the directors by surprise – they announced that the board would take over the manager's job for the rest of the season, with help from secretary George Goss.

=== Coventry City ===
He soon returned to football, taking over as manager at his former club Coventry City in June 1928. His presence was quickly felt as the club ended the 1929–30 season in its best ever league position, finishing sixth in Third Division (South).

But after a long-running dispute with the board over the sale of several star players, McIntyre was sacked in February 1931.

=== Fulham ===
He was quickly snapped up by Fulham and he took them out of the Third Division (South) in 1932. From the outset, the Cottagers led the Third Division table and by April were worthy champions. It was a record-breaking season for Fulham and McIntyre became the first manager to win promotion from Division Three with two different clubs.

McIntyre acquired several players from his former club, Southampton, with Bill Fraser, Arthur Haddleton and Bert Jepson moving to Craven Cottage in June 1932, followed by Mike Keeping and Johnny Arnold in February 1933, for a combined fee of £5,000. McIntyre boasted that this was "the best deal I ever brought off".

The revival continued in 1932–33 when another spirited promotion attempt only failed in the closing weeks, with Fulham finishing in third position in Division 2. Fulham's high hopes for the 1933–34 season were never fulfilled; supporters blamed this on the shock transfer of top scorer Frank Newton to Reading in September and his replacement with the £2,500 signing of Arsenal's veteran striker Jack Lambert, who failed to make any impact. A run of bad results over the New Year led to McIntyre's surprise dismissal in February 1934.

== After football ==
McIntyre never got another job in football. He returned to Southampton and worked for the Folland Aircraft Company and died, aged 72, in Surrey, England.

== Honours ==
=== As manager ===
Southampton

- Football League Third Division South: 1921–22

Fulham

- Football League Third Division South: 1931–32
