= 1919–20 in English football =

Football in England
- Season: 1919–20

Men's football
- Football League: West Bromwich Albion
- Football League Second Division: Tottenham Hotspur
- FA Cup: Aston Villa

The 1919–1920 season was the 45th season of competitive football in England, and the first following the end of World War I.

== Honours ==
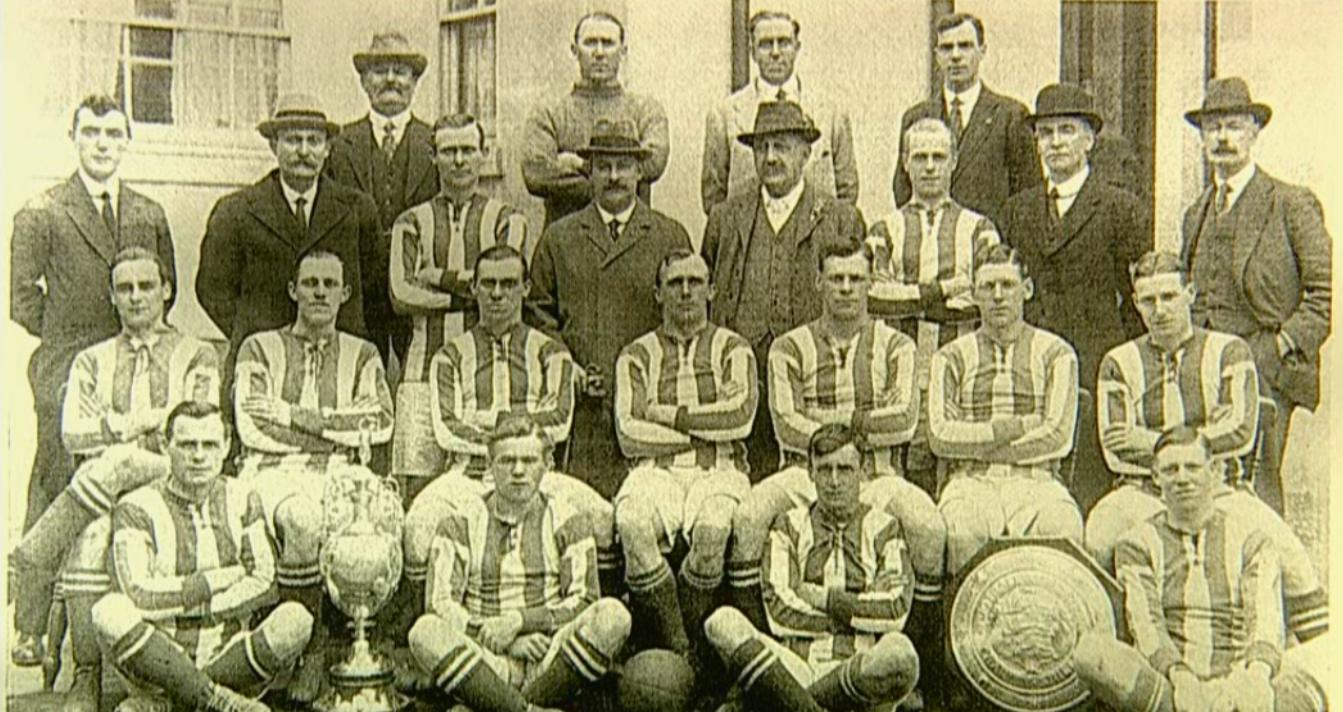
Division One winners West Bromwich Albion pose with the League Championship trophy and Charity Shield

Competition	Winner	Runner-up
Football League First Division	West Bromwich Albion (1)	Burnley
Football League Second Division	Tottenham Hotspur	Huddersfield Town
Southern League First Division	Portsmouth	Watford
Southern League Second Division	Mid Rhondda	Ton Petre
FA Cup	Aston Villa (6*)	Huddersfield Town
FA Charity Shield	West Bromwich Albion (1)	Tottenham Hotspur
Home Championship	Wales	England & Scotland

Notes = Number in parentheses is the times that club has won that honour. * indicates new record for competition

== Football League ==
Following the War The Football League grew from 40 to 44 teams. The failure of Glossop to be re-elected to the league meant that five new clubs joined the league. A resurrected Stoke, along with Coventry City, South Shields, Rotherham County and West Ham United joined the Second Division.

Six of the seven players banned for their involvement in the 1915 British football betting scandal were re-instated in recognition of their service to the country during World War I. Sandy Turnbull's re-instatement was posthumous as he had been killed in the war. Enoch West, who had fought his ban more vigorously than the others, was denied re-instatement.

=== First Division ===
Pos	Team	Pld	W	D	L	GF	GA	GAv	Pts	Relegation
1	West Bromwich Albion (C)	42	28	4	10	104	47	2.213	60	
2	Burnley	42	21	9	12	65	59	1.102	51	
3	Chelsea	42	22	5	15	56	51	1.098	49	
4	Liverpool	42	19	10	13	59	44	1.341	48	
5	Sunderland	42	22	4	16	72	59	1.220	48	
6	Bolton Wanderers	42	19	9	14	72	65	1.108	47	
7	Manchester City	42	18	9	15	71	62	1.145	45	
8	Newcastle United	42	17	9	16	44	39	1.128	43	
9	Aston Villa	42	18	6	18	75	73	1.027	42	
10	Arsenal	42	15	12	15	56	58	0.966	42	
11	Bradford (Park Avenue)	42	15	12	15	60	63	0.952	42	
12	Manchester United	42	13	14	15	54	50	1.080	40	
13	Middlesbrough	42	15	10	17	61	65	0.938	40	
14	Sheffield United	42	16	8	18	59	69	0.855	40	
15	Bradford City	42	14	11	17	54	63	0.857	39	
16	Everton	42	12	14	16	69	68	1.015	38	
17	Oldham Athletic	42	15	8	19	49	52	0.942	38	
18	Derby County	42	13	12	17	47	57	0.825	38	
19	Preston North End	42	14	10	18	57	73	0.781	38	
20	Blackburn Rovers	42	13	11	18	64	77	0.831	37	
21	Notts County (R)	42	12	12	18	56	74	0.757	36	Relegation to the Second Division
22	The Wednesday (R)	42	7	9	26	28	64	0.438	23	Relegation to the Second Division

Source: World Football
Rules for classification: 1) Points; 2) Goal average; 3) Goals scored
(C) Champions; (R) Relegated

=== Second Division ===
Pos	Team	Pld	W	D	L	GF	GA	GAv	Pts	Promotion or relegation
1	Tottenham Hotspur (C, P)	42	32	6	4	102	32	3.188	70	Promotion to the First Division
2	Huddersfield Town (P)	42	28	8	6	97	38	2.553	64	Promotion to the First Division
3	Birmingham	42	24	8	10	85	34	2.500	56	
4	Blackpool	42	21	10	11	65	47	1.383	52	
5	Bury	42	20	8	14	60	44	1.364	48	
6	Fulham	42	19	9	14	61	50	1.220	47	
7	West Ham United	42	19	9	14	47	40	1.175	47	
8	Bristol City	42	13	17	12	46	43	1.070	43	
9	South Shields	42	15	12	15	58	48	1.208	42	
10	Stoke	42	18	6	18	60	54	1.111	42	
11	Hull City	42	18	6	18	78	72	1.083	42	
12	Barnsley	42	15	10	17	61	55	1.109	40	
13	Port Vale (Leeds City) (Note: Leeds City were expelled from the league after 8 games; Port Vale took their place and inherited their record.)	42	16	8	18	59	62	0.952	40	
14	Leicester City	42	15	10	17	41	61	0.672	40	
15	Clapton Orient	42	16	6	20	51	59	0.864	38	
16	Stockport County	42	14	9	19	52	61	0.852	37	
17	Rotherham County	42	13	8	21	51	83	0.614	34	
18	Nottingham Forest	42	11	9	22	43	73	0.589	31	
19	Wolverhampton Wanderers	42	10	10	22	55	80	0.688	30	
20	Coventry City	42	9	11	22	35	73	0.479	29	
21	Lincoln City (R)	42	9	9	24	44	101	0.436	27	Failed re-election and demoted
22	Grimsby Town (R)	42	10	5	27	34	75	0.453	25	Failed re-election and demoted to the Third Division

(C) Champions; (P) Promoted; (R) Relegated

== Southern League ==
=== Southern League First Division ===
Pos	Team	Pld	W	D	L	GF	GA	GR	Pts	Qualification
1	Portsmouth	42	23	12	7	73	27	2.704	58	Elected to the new Football League Third Division
2	Watford	42	26	6	10	69	42	1.643	58	Elected to the new Football League Third Division
3	Crystal Palace	42	22	12	8	69	43	1.605	56	Elected to the new Football League Third Division
4	Cardiff City	42	18	17	7	70	43	1.628	53	Elected to the Football League Second Division
5	Plymouth Argyle	42	20	10	12	57	29	1.966	50	Elected to the new Football League Third Division
6	Queens Park Rangers	42	18	10	14	62	50	1.240	46	Elected to the new Football League Third Division
7	Reading	42	16	13	13	51	43	1.186	45	Elected to the new Football League Third Division
8	Southampton	42	18	8	16	72	63	1.143	44	Elected to the new Football League Third Division
9	Swansea Town	42	16	11	15	53	45	1.178	43	Elected to the new Football League Third Division
10	Exeter City	42	17	9	16	57	51	1.118	43	Elected to the new Football League Third Division
11	Southend United	42	13	17	12	46	48	0.958	43	Elected to the new Football League Third Division
12	Norwich City	42	15	11	16	64	57	1.123	41	Elected to the new Football League Third Division
13	Swindon Town	42	17	7	18	65	68	0.956	41	Elected to the new Football League Third Division
14	Millwall	42	14	12	16	52	55	0.945	40	Elected to the new Football League Third Division
15	Brentford	42	15	10	17	52	59	0.881	40	Elected to the new Football League Third Division
16	Brighton & Hove Albion	42	14	8	20	60	72	0.833	36	Elected to the new Football League Third Division
17	Bristol Rovers	42	11	13	18	61	78	0.782	35	Elected to the new Football League Third Division
18	Newport County	42	13	7	22	45	70	0.643	33	Elected to the new Football League Third Division
19	Northampton Town	42	12	9	21	64	103	0.621	33	Elected to the new Football League Third Division
20	Luton Town	42	10	10	22	51	76	0.671	30	Elected to the new Football League Third Division
21	Merthyr Town	42	9	11	22	47	78	0.603	29	Elected to the new Football League Third Division
22	Gillingham	42	10	7	25	34	74	0.459	27	Elected to the new Football League Third Division

Rules for classification: The system of using goal average to separate two teams tied on points was used up until the 1976-77 season. The points system: 2 points for a win, 1 point for a draw and 0 points for losing.
