= 1921–22 in English football =

Football in England
- Season: 1921–22

Men's football
- Football League: Liverpool
- Football League Second Division: Nottingham Forest
- FA Cup: Huddersfield Town

The 1921–22 season was the 47th season of competitive football in England.

== Overview ==
The league underwent a major expansion for the second consecutive season, adding 20 teams from the Midlands and Northern England. They were placed in the new Third Division North, and the existing southern-based Third Division became the Third Division South. This was the first year the Third Division was split into North and South sections.

== Honours ==
| Competition | Winner | Runner-up |
|---|---|---|
| First Division | Liverpool (3) | Tottenham Hotspur |
| Second Division | Nottingham Forest | Stoke |
| Third Division North | Stockport County | Darlington |
| Third Division South | Southampton | Plymouth Argyle |
| FA Cup | Huddersfield Town (1) | Preston North End |
| Charity Shield | Tottenham Hotspur | Burnley |
| Home Championship | Scotland | England & Wales |

Notes = Number in parentheses is the times that club has won that honour. * indicates new record for competition

== Football League ==
=== First Division ===
| Pos | Team | Pld | W | D | L | GF | GA | GAv | Pts | Relegation |
|---|---|---|---|---|---|---|---|---|---|---|
| 1 | Liverpool (C) | 42 | 22 | 13 | 7 | 63 | 36 | 1.750 | 57 | |
| 2 | Tottenham Hotspur | 42 | 21 | 9 | 12 | 65 | 39 | 1.667 | 51 | |
| 3 | Burnley | 42 | 22 | 5 | 15 | 72 | 54 | 1.333 | 49 | |
| 4 | Cardiff City | 42 | 19 | 10 | 13 | 61 | 53 | 1.151 | 48 | |
| 5 | Aston Villa | 42 | 22 | 3 | 17 | 74 | 55 | 1.345 | 47 | |
| 6 | Bolton Wanderers | 42 | 20 | 7 | 15 | 68 | 59 | 1.153 | 47 | |
| 7 | Newcastle United | 42 | 18 | 10 | 14 | 59 | 45 | 1.311 | 46 | |
| 8 | Middlesbrough | 42 | 16 | 14 | 12 | 79 | 69 | 1.145 | 46 | |
| 9 | Chelsea | 42 | 17 | 12 | 13 | 40 | 43 | 0.930 | 46 | |
| 10 | Manchester City | 42 | 18 | 9 | 15 | 65 | 70 | 0.929 | 45 | |
| 11 | Sheffield United | 42 | 15 | 10 | 17 | 59 | 54 | 1.093 | 40 | |
| 12 | Sunderland | 42 | 16 | 8 | 18 | 60 | 62 | 0.968 | 40 | |
| 13 | West Bromwich Albion | 42 | 15 | 10 | 17 | 51 | 63 | 0.810 | 40 | |
| 14 | Huddersfield Town | 42 | 15 | 9 | 18 | 53 | 54 | 0.981 | 39 | |
| 15 | Blackburn Rovers | 42 | 13 | 12 | 17 | 54 | 57 | 0.947 | 38 | |
| 16 | Preston North End | 42 | 13 | 12 | 17 | 42 | 65 | 0.646 | 38 | |
| 17 | Arsenal | 42 | 15 | 7 | 20 | 47 | 56 | 0.839 | 37 | |
| 18 | Birmingham | 42 | 15 | 7 | 20 | 48 | 60 | 0.800 | 37 | |
| 19 | Oldham Athletic | 42 | 13 | 11 | 18 | 38 | 50 | 0.760 | 37 | |
| 20 | Everton | 42 | 12 | 12 | 18 | 57 | 55 | 1.036 | 36 | |
| 21 | Bradford City (R) | 42 | 11 | 10 | 21 | 48 | 72 | 0.667 | 32 | Relegation to the Second Division |
| 22 | Manchester United (R) | 42 | 8 | 12 | 22 | 41 | 73 | 0.562 | 28 | Relegation to the Second Division |

Source: World Football
Rules for classification: 1) Points; 2) Goal average; 3) Goals scored
(C) Champions; (R) Relegated

=== Second Division ===
| Pos | Team | Pld | W | D | L | GF | GA | GAv | Pts | Promotion or relegation |
|---|---|---|---|---|---|---|---|---|---|---|
| 1 | Nottingham Forest (C, P) | 42 | 22 | 12 | 8 | 51 | 30 | 1.700 | 56 | Promotion to the First Division |
| 2 | Stoke (P) | 42 | 18 | 16 | 8 | 60 | 44 | 1.364 | 52 | Promotion to the First Division |
| 3 | Barnsley | 42 | 22 | 8 | 12 | 67 | 52 | 1.288 | 52 | |
| 4 | West Ham United | 42 | 20 | 8 | 14 | 52 | 39 | 1.333 | 48 | |
| 5 | Hull City | 42 | 19 | 10 | 13 | 51 | 41 | 1.244 | 48 | |
| 6 | South Shields | 42 | 17 | 12 | 13 | 43 | 38 | 1.132 | 46 | |
| 7 | Fulham | 42 | 18 | 9 | 15 | 57 | 38 | 1.500 | 45 | |
| 8 | Leeds United | 42 | 16 | 13 | 13 | 48 | 38 | 1.263 | 45 | |
| 9 | Leicester City | 42 | 14 | 17 | 11 | 39 | 34 | 1.147 | 45 | |
| 10 | The Wednesday | 42 | 15 | 14 | 13 | 47 | 50 | 0.940 | 44 | |
| 11 | Bury | 42 | 15 | 10 | 17 | 54 | 55 | 0.982 | 40 | |
| 12 | Derby County | 42 | 15 | 9 | 18 | 60 | 64 | 0.938 | 39 | |
| 13 | Notts County | 42 | 12 | 15 | 15 | 47 | 51 | 0.922 | 39 | |
| 14 | Crystal Palace | 42 | 13 | 13 | 16 | 45 | 51 | 0.882 | 39 | |
| 15 | Clapton Orient | 42 | 15 | 9 | 18 | 43 | 50 | 0.860 | 39 | |
| 16 | Rotherham County | 42 | 14 | 11 | 17 | 32 | 43 | 0.744 | 39 | |
| 17 | Wolverhampton Wanderers | 42 | 13 | 11 | 18 | 44 | 49 | 0.898 | 37 | |
| 18 | Port Vale | 42 | 14 | 8 | 20 | 43 | 57 | 0.754 | 36 | |
| 19 | Blackpool | 42 | 15 | 5 | 22 | 44 | 57 | 0.772 | 35 | |
| 20 | Coventry City | 42 | 12 | 10 | 20 | 51 | 60 | 0.850 | 34 | |
| 21 | Bradford (Park Avenue) (R) | 42 | 12 | 9 | 21 | 46 | 62 | 0.742 | 33 | Relegation to the Third Division North |
| 22 | Bristol City (R) | 42 | 12 | 9 | 21 | 37 | 58 | 0.638 | 33 | Relegation to the Third Division South |

(C) Champions; (P) Promoted; (R) Relegated

=== Third Division North ===
| Pos | Team | Pld | W | D | L | GF | GA | GAv | Pts | Qualification or relegation |
|---|---|---|---|---|---|---|---|---|---|---|
| 1 | Stockport County (C, P) | 38 | 24 | 8 | 6 | 60 | 21 | 2.857 | 56 | Promotion to the Second Division |
| 2 | Darlington | 38 | 22 | 6 | 10 | 81 | 37 | 2.189 | 50 | |
| 3 | Grimsby Town | 38 | 21 | 8 | 9 | 72 | 47 | 1.532 | 50 | |
| 4 | Hartlepools United | 38 | 17 | 8 | 13 | 52 | 39 | 1.333 | 42 | |
| 5 | Accrington Stanley | 38 | 19 | 3 | 16 | 73 | 57 | 1.281 | 41 | |
| 6 | Crewe Alexandra | 38 | 18 | 5 | 15 | 60 | 56 | 1.071 | 41 | |
| 7 | Stalybridge Celtic | 38 | 18 | 5 | 15 | 62 | 63 | 0.984 | 41 | |
| 8 | Walsall | 38 | 18 | 3 | 17 | 66 | 65 | 1.015 | 39 | |
| 9 | Southport | 38 | 14 | 10 | 14 | 55 | 44 | 1.250 | 38 | |
| 10 | Ashington | 38 | 17 | 4 | 17 | 59 | 66 | 0.894 | 38 | |
| 11 | Durham City | 38 | 17 | 3 | 18 | 68 | 67 | 1.015 | 37 | |
| 12 | Wrexham | 38 | 14 | 9 | 15 | 51 | 56 | 0.911 | 37 | |
| 13 | Chesterfield | 38 | 16 | 3 | 19 | 48 | 67 | 0.716 | 35 | |
| 14 | Lincoln City | 38 | 14 | 6 | 18 | 48 | 59 | 0.814 | 34 | |
| 15 | Barrow | 38 | 14 | 5 | 19 | 42 | 54 | 0.778 | 33 | |
| 16 | Nelson | 38 | 13 | 7 | 18 | 48 | 66 | 0.727 | 33 | |
| 17 | Wigan Borough | 38 | 11 | 9 | 18 | 46 | 72 | 0.639 | 31 | |
| 18 | Tranmere Rovers | 38 | 9 | 11 | 18 | 51 | 61 | 0.836 | 29 | |
| 19 | Halifax Town | 38 | 10 | 9 | 19 | 56 | 76 | 0.737 | 29 | Re-elected |
| 20 | Rochdale | 38 | 11 | 4 | 23 | 52 | 77 | 0.675 | 26 | Re-elected |

Source: rsssf.com
(C) Champions; (P) Promoted

=== Third Division South ===
| Pos | Team | Pld | W | D | L | GF | GA | GD | Pts | Qualification or relegation |
|---|---|---|---|---|---|---|---|---|---|---|
| 1 | Southampton (C, P) | 42 | 23 | 15 | 4 | 68 | 21 | +47 | 61 | Promotion to the Second Division |
| 2 | Plymouth Argyle | 42 | 25 | 11 | 6 | 63 | 24 | +39 | 61 | |
| 3 | Portsmouth | 42 | 18 | 17 | 7 | 62 | 39 | +23 | 53 | |
| 4 | Luton Town | 42 | 22 | 8 | 12 | 64 | 35 | +29 | 52 | |
| 5 | Queens Park Rangers | 42 | 18 | 13 | 11 | 53 | 44 | +9 | 49 | |
| 6 | Swindon Town | 42 | 16 | 13 | 13 | 72 | 60 | +12 | 45 | |
| 7 | Watford | 42 | 13 | 18 | 11 | 54 | 48 | +6 | 44 | |
| 8 | Aberdare Athletic | 42 | 17 | 10 | 15 | 57 | 51 | +6 | 44 | |
| 9 | Brentford | 42 | 16 | 11 | 15 | 52 | 43 | +9 | 43 | |
| 10 | Swansea Town | 42 | 13 | 15 | 14 | 50 | 47 | +3 | 41 | |
| 11 | Merthyr Town | 42 | 17 | 6 | 19 | 45 | 56 | −11 | 40 | |
| 12 | Millwall | 42 | 10 | 18 | 14 | 38 | 42 | −4 | 38 | |
| 13 | Reading | 42 | 14 | 10 | 18 | 40 | 47 | −7 | 38 | |
| 14 | Bristol Rovers | 42 | 14 | 10 | 18 | 52 | 67 | −15 | 38 | |
| 15 | Norwich City | 42 | 12 | 13 | 17 | 50 | 62 | −12 | 37 | |
| 16 | Charlton Athletic | 42 | 13 | 11 | 18 | 43 | 56 | −13 | 37 | |
| 17 | Northampton Town | 42 | 13 | 11 | 18 | 47 | 71 | −24 | 37 | |
| 18 | Gillingham | 42 | 14 | 8 | 20 | 47 | 60 | −13 | 36 | |
| 19 | Brighton & Hove Albion | 42 | 13 | 9 | 20 | 45 | 51 | −6 | 35 | |
| 20 | Newport County | 42 | 11 | 12 | 19 | 44 | 61 | −17 | 34 | |
| 21 | Exeter City | 42 | 11 | 12 | 19 | 38 | 59 | −21 | 34 | Re-elected |
| 22 | Southend United | 42 | 8 | 11 | 23 | 34 | 74 | −40 | 27 | Re-elected |

(C) Champions; (P) Promoted

=== Top goalscorers ===
First Division

- Andy Wilson (Middlesbrough) – 31 goals

Second Division

- Jimmy Broad (Stoke) – 25 goals

Third Division North

- Jimmy Carmichael (Grimsby Town) – 37 goals

Third Division South

- Frank Richardson (Plymouth Argyle) – 31 goals
