= 1924–25 Southampton F.C. season =

English football club season

Southampton F.C.
1924–25 season
- Chairman: Wyndham Portal
- Manager: Jimmy McIntyre (until December 1924); George Goss (from December 1924)
- Stadium: The Dell
- Second Division: 7th
- FA Cup: Semi-finals
- Top goalscorer: League: Bill Rawlings (14); All: Arthur Dominy and Bill Rawlings (16)
- Highest home attendance: League: 19,366 v Portsmouth (27 September 1924); Overall: 21,501 v Liverpool (7 March 1925)
- Lowest home attendance: 4,000 v Blackpool (1 November 1924)
- Average home league attendance: 8,939
- Biggest win: 3–0 v Stoke (8 September 1924); 3–0 v Coventry City (2 May 1925)
- Biggest defeat: 0–3 v Derby County (8 November 1924); 0–3 v Wolverhampton Wanderers (20 December 1924)
Home colours

The 1924–25 season was the 30th season of competitive football by Southampton, and the club's third in the Second Division of the Football League. Following the 1923–24 season, in which the club finished just three points shy of the First Division promotion places in fifth place, the Saints dropped two positions to finish seventh in the league. As with the last season, Southampton began their Second Division campaign poorly and found themselves at the bottom of the table after two losses in their first three games. The side continued to struggle to pick up wins, but steadily began making their way up the table over the next few months. A number of wins over the Christmas period and an eight-game unbeaten run at the end of the season helped Southampton finish in seventh place with 13 wins, 18 draws and 11 losses.

In the 1924–25 FA Cup, Southampton beat Third Division South sides Exeter City and Brighton & Hove Albion in the first and second rounds, respectively, followed by Second Division rivals Bradford City in the third. They then edged past four-time First Division champions Liverpool with a 1–0 win in the fourth round, before being eliminated by Sheffield United, another top-flight side, in the semi-final. United went on to win the tournament, beating Cardiff City in the final at Wembley Stadium. The club ended the season with two games against local rivals Portsmouth, for the Rowland Hospital Cup and the Hampshire Benevolent Cup, respectively. The former ended in a draw and the latter was won by Pompey. In their two friendly games of the season, the Saints drew 1–1 with Plymouth Argyle in November and March.

Southampton used 22 different players during the 1924–25 season and had eight different goalscorers. The club's top scorers were centre-forward Bill Rawlings and inside-right Arthur Dominy, both of whom scored 16 goals in all competitions (Rawlings was the top scorer in the league with 14 goals). Nine new players were signed by the club during the campaign, while six were sold to other clubs and one was loaned out for the season. The average attendance at The Dell during the 1924–25 season was 8,939. The highest attendance was 21,501 against Liverpool in the fourth round of the FA Cup; the lowest was around 4,000 against Blackpool on 1 November 1924. The season was the club's last to feature manager Jimmy McIntyre, who left in December 1924; the Southampton board subsequently took over the role.

== Background and transfers ==
At the end of the 1923–24 season, Southampton brought in centre-half John Callagher and inside-forward Stan Woodhouse from Bury, who had just been promoted to the First Division as runners-up of the second flight. As part of the deal, left-half Bill Turner moved to the Manchester-based club, where he would remain for a total of three seasons. In a similar deal, the Saints sold full-back Harry Hooper to divisional rivals Leicester City, in exchange for right-half Dennis Jones and outside-left Fred Price. None of the four new players would become regulars in the side, however, and all but Woodhouse had left by the end of the 1924–25 season. In June, outside-left Elias MacDonald – who had joined from Burton All Saints just a year earlier – left for Third Division South side Southend United. The following month, inside-left Jock Salter also left Southampton after just one season at the club (during which he made a single appearance), joining Thornycrofts. Also in July, outside-right Tommy Broad joined from Stoke.

In August, outside-right Charlie Brown left Southampton to join Third Division South club Queens Park Rangers. Harold Pearson left around the same to join Coventry City. Manager Jimmy McIntyre brought two more players to the club before the start of the league campaign – centre-forward Jimmy Bullock signed from Crewe Alexandra in the Third Division North, while goalkeeper James Thitchener joined on amateur terms from local club Totton. The club signed another amateur in October, Bournemouth & Boscombe Athletic half-back Ernie King, who had signed professional terms by January 1925. In November, Scottish forward Willie McCall returned to his home country on loan with former club Queen of the South, who he would later join in a permanent deal. The last transfer activity of the 1924–25 season came in February 1925, when wing-half Albert Barrett joined Southampton from West Ham United, making one appearance in the Second Division before leaving for Fulham the following summer.

Players transferred in

Name	Nationality	Pos.	Club	Date	Fee	Ref.
John Callagher	Scotland	HB	(England) Bury	May 1924	Exchange	
Stan Woodhouse	England	FW	(England) Bury	May 1924	Exchange	
Dennis Jones	England	HB	(England) Leicester City	May 1924	Exchange	
Fred Price	England	FW	(England) Leicester City	May 1924	Exchange	
Tommy Broad	England	FW	(England) Stoke	July 1924	Unknown	
Jimmy Bullock	England	FW	(England) Crewe Alexandra	August 1924	Unknown	
James Thitchener	England	GK	(England) Totton	August 1924	Free (Note: James Thitchener initially joined on amateur terms in August 1924, before turning professional in August 1926.)	
Ernie King	England	HB	(England) Bournemouth & Boscombe Athletic	October 1924	Free (Note: Ernie King initially joined on amateur terms in October 1924, before turning part-time professional in January 1925.)	
Albert Barrett	England	HB	(England) West Ham United	February 1925	Unknown	

Players transferred out

Name	Nationality	Pos.	Club	Date	Fee	Ref.
Harry Hooper	England	FB	(England) Leicester City	May 1924	Exchange	
Bill Turner	England	HB	(England) Bury	May 1924	Exchange	
Elias MacDonald	England	FW	(England) Southend United	June 1924	Unknown	
Jock Salter	England	FW	(England) Thornycrofts	July 1924	Free	
Charlie Brown	England	FW	(England) Queens Park Rangers	August 1924	Unknown	
Harold Pearson	England	FW	(England) Coventry City	August 1924	£250	

Players loaned out

Name	Nationality	Pos.	Club	Start date	End date	Ref.
Willie McCall	Scotland	FW	(Scotland) Queen of the South	November 1924	End of season	

== Second Division ==
Southampton's 1924–25 season started similarly poorly to the previous campaign. After starting with a goalless draw at home to Oldham Athletic on 30 August, the team lost away games against Stoke and The Wednesday to find themselves at the bottom of the league table by 6 September. However, the team won the return fixture against Stoke 3–0 and beat Clapton Orient 2–0 the following week (all but one of the five goals scored by Arthur Dominy), quickly moving them up to the top half of the table. Southampton struggled to embark on any run of form throughout the rest of September and October, picking up five draws and three losses from their next eight games as they remained just clear of danger at the bottom of the table. November saw the side pick up two more wins – against struggling sides Blackpool and Bradford City – and in December they picked up another two with victories at home to Barnsley and Fulham. By the end of 1924, the Saints sat comfortably in the top half of the Second Division table.

In December 1924, Jimmy McIntyre left Southampton after more than 200 games during a five-year tenure as the club's manager. The board of directors subsequently began to handle managerial duties for the club, with secretary George Goss taking over the role of first team coach for the rest of the season. The team continued to occupy a mid-table position throughout early 1925, picking up wins over struggling teams such as Crystal Palace and Stockport County to remain competitive in the league, but continuing to drop points to higher-placed teams. After dropping back to 15th in the table, Southampton began an unbeaten run of eight games in April to return to the top half for the end of the season. The spell included draws with eventual champions and runners-up Leicester City and Manchester United, and culminated in wins over Bradford City and Coventry City, who finished bottom of the league. Southampton finished in seventh place with 13 wins, 18 draws and 11 losses, two places and four points lower than 1923–24.

=== List of match results ===
30 August 1924 1	Southampton	0–0	Oldham Athletic	Southampton
				Stadium: The Dell; Attendance: 11,000

1 September 1924 2	Stoke	2–0	Southampton	Stoke-on-Trent
				Stadium: Victoria Ground; Attendance: 12,000

6 September 1924 3	The Wednesday	1–0	Southampton	Sheffield
				Stadium: Hillsborough Stadium; Attendance: 25,000

8 September 1924 4	Southampton	3–0	Stoke	Southampton
	Dominy; Rawlings			Stadium: The Dell; Attendance: 8,867

13 September 1924 5	Southampton	2–0	Clapton Orient	Southampton
	Dominy			Stadium: The Dell; Attendance: 6,000

15 September 1924 6	Coventry City	1–0	Southampton	Coventry
				Stadium: Highfield Road; Attendance: 9,000

20 September 1924 7	Crystal Palace	3–1	Southampton	London
			Rawlings	Stadium: The Nest; Attendance: 10,000

27 September 1924 8	Southampton	0–0	Portsmouth	Southampton
				Stadium: The Dell; Attendance: 19,366

4 October 1924 9	Southampton	0–0	Chelsea	Southampton
				Stadium: The Dell; Attendance: 12,000

11 October 1924 10	Stockport County	1–1	Southampton	Stockport
			Rawlings	Stadium: Edgeley Park; Attendance: 12,000

13 October 1924 11	Port Vale	1–1	Southampton	Hanley
			Woodhouse	Stadium: Old Recreation Ground; Attendance: 9,000

18 October 1924 12	Southampton	0–2	Manchester United	Southampton
				Stadium: The Dell; Attendance: 14,000

25 October 1924 13	Hull City	1–1	Southampton	Kingston upon Hull
			C. Price	Stadium: Anlaby Road; Attendance: 10,000

1 November 1924 14	Southampton	2–1	Blackpool	Southampton
	Rawlings; C. Price			Stadium: The Dell; Attendance: 4,000

8 November 1924 15	Derby County	3–0	Southampton	Derby
				Stadium: Baseball Ground; Attendance: 14,000

15 November 1924 16	Southampton	1–1	South Shields	Southampton
	Parker			Stadium: The Dell; Attendance: 8,000

22 November 1924 17	Bradford City	1–2	Southampton	Bradford
			Dominy; Rawlings	Stadium: Valley Parade; Attendance: 10,000

29 November 1924 18	Portsmouth	1–1	Southampton	Portsmouth
			Dominy	Stadium: Fratton Park; Attendance: 25,000

6 December 1924 19	Middlesbrough	0–0	Southampton	Middlesbrough
				Stadium: Ayresome Park; Attendance: 12,000

13 December 1924 20	Southampton	3–1	Barnsley	Southampton
	Parker; Rawlings; C. Price			Stadium: The Dell; Attendance: 7,000

20 December 1924 21	Wolverhampton Wanderers	3–0	Southampton	Wolverhampton
				Stadium: Molineux Stadium; Attendance: 13,000

26 December 1924 22	Southampton	1–0	Fulham	Southampton
	C. Price			Stadium: The Dell; Attendance: 17,000

27 December 1924 23	Oldham Athletic	1–1	Southampton	Oldham
			Dominy	Stadium: Boundary Park; Attendance: 6,000

3 January 1925 24	Southampton	1–0	The Wednesday	Southampton
	Rawlings			Stadium: The Dell; Attendance: 7,000

17 January 1925 25	Clapton Orient	1–0	Southampton	London
				Stadium: Clapton Stadium; Attendance: 12,000

24 January 1925 26	Southampton	2–0	Crystal Palace	Southampton
	Rawlings; Carr			Stadium: The Dell; Attendance: 9,000

7 February 1925 27	Chelsea	1–0	Southampton	London
				Stadium: Stamford Bridge; Attendance: 30,000

14 February 1925 28	Southampton	2–1	Stockport County	Southampton
	Rawlings			Stadium: The Dell; Attendance: 8,000

28 February 1925 29	Southampton	2–2	Hull City	Southampton
	Harkus; Cribb			Stadium: The Dell; Attendance: 7,000

14 March 1925 30	Southampton	2–0	Derby County	Southampton
	Rawlings; Carr			Stadium: The Dell; Attendance: 12,000

21 March 1925 31	South Shields	1–1	Southampton	South Shields
			Dominy	Stadium: Horsley Hill; Attendance: 8,000

1 April 1925 32	Blackpool	1–0	Southampton	Blackpool
				Stadium: Bloomfield Road; Attendance: 9,000

4 April 1925 33	Southampton	1–0	Port Vale	Southampton
	Dominy			Stadium: The Dell; Attendance: 5,000

10 April 1925 34	Fulham	1–0	Southampton	London
				Stadium: Craven Cottage; Attendance: 12,000

11 April 1925 35	Southampton	1–1	Middlesbrough	Southampton
	C. Price			Stadium: The Dell; Attendance: 10,000

13 April 1925 36	Southampton	0–0	Leicester City	Southampton
				Stadium: The Dell; Attendance: 6,000

14 April 1925 37	Leicester City	0–0	Southampton	Leicester
				Stadium: Filbert Street; Attendance: 25,000

18 April 1925 38	Barnsley	1–1	Southampton	Barnsley
			Rawlings	Stadium: Oakwell; Attendance: 8,000

22 April 1925 39	Manchester United	1–1	Southampton	Manchester
			Dominy	Stadium: Old Trafford; Attendance: 40,000

25 April 1925 40	Southampton	1–1	Wolverhampton Wanderers	Southampton
	C. Price			Stadium: The Dell; Attendance: 6,000

30 April 1925 41	Southampton	2–0	Bradford City	Southampton
	Rawlings			Stadium: The Dell; Attendance: 5,500

2 May 1925 42	Southampton	3–0	Coventry City	Southampton
	Dominy			Stadium: The Dell; Attendance: 5,000

=== Final league table ===
Pos	Team	Pld	W	D	L	GF	GA	GAv	Pts
5	Chelsea	42	16	15	11	51	37	1.378	47
6	Wolverhampton Wanderers	42	20	6	16	55	51	1.078	46
7	Southampton	42	13	18	11	40	36	1.111	44
8	Port Vale	42	17	8	17	48	56	0.857	42
9	South Shields	42	12	17	13	42	38	1.105	41

=== Results by matchday ===
Round	1	2	3	4	5	6	7	8	9	10	11	12	13	14	15	16	17	18	19	20	21	22	23	24	25	26	27	28	29	30	31	32	33	34	35	36	37	38	39	40	41	42
Ground	H	A	A	H	H	A	A	H	H	A	A	H	A	H	A	H	A	A	A	H	A	H	A	H	A	H	A	H	H	H	A	A	H	A	H	H	A	A	A	H	H	H
Result	D	L	L	W	W	L	L	D	D	D	D	L	D	W	L	D	W	D	D	W	L	W	D	W	L	W	L	W	D	W	D	L	W	L	D	D	D	D	D	D	W	W
Position	13	18	22	12	9	10	16	15	15	15	13	14	14	12	14	15	12	12	14	11	13	11	9	9	11	8	9	9	10	10	10	13	11	13	15	13	10	10	9	9	7	7

Source: 11v11.com
A = Away; H = Home; W = Win; D = Draw; L = Loss

== FA Cup ==
Southampton entered the 1924–25 FA Cup in the first round against Third Division South club Exeter City. The game was initially played on 10 January 1921, but with the Saints leading 5–0 through goals from Arthur Dominy (two), Cliff Price (two) and Tom Parker, it was abandoned after 80 minutes due to the foggy weather conditions. According to club historians, "some Saints fans went on to the pitch 'in an effort to let the game go on', but the referee was adamant" and the fixture was abandoned. The game was replayed four days later at The Dell, with the hosts winning 3–1 thanks to goals from Dominy, Price and Bill Rawlings. In the second round the club hosted Brighton & Hove Albion, also of the Third Division South, who they beat by a single goal following an early penalty, which was converted by Parker. Second Division rivals Bradford City travelled to The Dell for the third round fixture, with Southampton winning 2–0 through Dominy and George Harkus to advance to the quarter-finals.

In the fourth round of the tournament, Southampton – in a fourth consecutive home tie – hosted former First Division champions Liverpool, who had eliminated them in the third round the previous season following a replay at Anfield. This time the hosts were victorious in the initial meeting, with Rawlings scoring the only goal of the game to send the Saints through to their first FA Cup semi-final since the 1907–08 season. In the semi-final, Southampton faced First Division side Sheffield United at Stamford Bridge, the home ground of Chelsea. Harkus came close to opening the scoring in the first half, but "shot wide with only the goalkeeper to beat". Later in the half, Parker "sliced" the ball past his own goalkeeper Tommy Allen to put United ahead. In the second half, Parker also missed a penalty following a foul on Rawlings in the area, and before the end of the match United doubled their lead after "a mix-up" between the Saints right-back and goalkeeper, eliminating the Second Division side.

14 January 1925 Round 1	Southampton	3–1	Exeter City	Southampton
	Dominy; Rawlings; Price			Stadium: The Dell; Attendance: 15,000

31 January 1925 Round 2	Southampton	1–0	Brighton & Hove Albion	Southampton
	Parker 4' (pen.)			Stadium: The Dell; Attendance: 17,795

21 February 1925 Round 3	Southampton	2–0	Bradford City	Southampton
	Dominy; Harkus			Stadium: The Dell; Attendance: 19,098

7 March 1925 Round 4	Southampton	1–0	Liverpool	Southampton
	Rawlings			Stadium: The Dell; Attendance: 21,501

28 March 1925 Semi-Final	Sheffield United	2–0	Southampton	London
	Parker (o.g.)			Stadium: Stamford Bridge; Attendance: 65,754

== Other matches ==
Outside of the league and the FA Cup, Southampton played four additional first-team matches during the 1924–25 season. The first was a friendly match against Third Division South side Plymouth Argyle on 24 November 1924. The game, which took place at The Dell and was arranged as a benefit for Southampton right-back Tom Parker, ended in a 1–1 draw, with Bill Rawlings scoring for the hosts. Southampton and Argyle met again on 16 March 1925 at Home Park. The second game also ended in a 1–1 draw, with the visitors' goal scored by inside-left Cliff Price.

As usual, Southampton ended their season with two games against local rivals Portsmouth. The first meeting, for the Rowland Hospital Cup, took place on 4 May 1925 and saw home side Pompey beating the Saints 2–0. Willie Haines, who scored five goals in the three meetings between the sides the previous season, opened the scoring in the third minute, before Jerry Mackie scored the second later on. Two days later, the teams drew 1–1 in the Hampshire Benevolent Cup at The Dell. Arthur Dominy scored the equaliser for Southampton after Martin opened for Pompey.

24 November 1924 Friendly	Southampton	1–1	Plymouth Argyle	Southampton
	Rawlings			Stadium: The Dell

16 March 1925 Friendly	Plymouth Argyle	1–1	Southampton	Plymouth
			Price	Stadium: Home Park

4 May 1925 Rowland Hospital Cup	Portsmouth	2–0	Southampton	Portsmouth
	Haines 3'; Mackie			Stadium: Fratton Park; Attendance: 7,590; Referee: J. V. Pennington

6 May 1925 Hampshire BC	Southampton	1–1	Portsmouth	Southampton
	Dominy		Martin	Stadium: The Dell; Referee: J. V. Pennington

== Player details ==
Southampton used 22 different players during the 1924–25 season, eight of whom scored during the campaign. The team played in a 2–3–5 formation throughout the campaign, using two full-backs, three half-backs, two outside forwards, two inside forwards and a centre-forward. Right-half Bert Shelley made the most appearances during the season, playing in all but one league match. Inside-right Arthur Dominy and left-half George Harkus each missed just two league games, while centre-forward Bill Rawlings appeared in all but three. Rawlings and Dominy finished the season as the club's joint top scorers – the former scored 14 in the league and two in the FA Cup, while the latter scored 13 in the league, two in the FA Cup, and one in the Hampshire Benevolent Cup. Harkus was the club's only scoring half-back of the season, with two league goals, and right-back Tom Parker was their only scoring full-back of the season, netting in the league three times to finish third overall for the season.

=== Squad statistics ===
Name	Pos.	Nat.	League		FA Cup		Other (Note: "Other" includes the Rowland Hospital Cup and Hampshire Benevolent Cup matches.)		Total	
Name	Pos.	Nat.	Apps.	Gls.	Apps.	Gls.	Apps.	Gls.	Apps.	Gls.
Tommy Allen	GK	(England)	38	0	5	0	0	0	42	0
Albert Barrett	HB	(England)	1	0	0	0	0	0	1	0
Arthur Bradford	HB	(England)	13	0	3	0	2	0	18	0
Tommy Broad	FW	(England)	9	0	0	0	0	0	9	0
Jimmy Bullock	FW	(England)	1	0	0	0	2	0	3	0
John Callagher	HB	(Scotland)	1	0	0	0	0	0	1	0
Alec Campbell	HB	(England)	26	0	5	0	0	0	31	0
Jimmy Carr	FW	(Scotland)	28	2	3	0	2	0	33	2
Stan Cribb	FW	(England)	6	1	2	0	0	0	8	1
Arthur Dominy	FW	(England)	40	13	5	2	2	1	47	16
George Harkus	HB	(England)	40	1	5	1	2	0	47	2
Bill Henderson	FW	(England)	34	0	5	0	2	0	41	0
Ted Hough	FB	(England)	27	0	1	0	2	0	30	0
Michael Keeping	FB	(England)	7	0	0	0	0	0	7	0
Tom Parker	FB	(England)	30	2	5	1	0	0	35	3
Cliff Price	FW	(England)	24	0	1	0	2	0	27	0
Fred Price	FW	(England)	9	2	0	0	0	0	9	2
Bill Rawlings	FW	(England)	41	14	5	2	0	0	46	16
Bert Shelley	HB	(England)	41	0	5	0	2	0	49	0
Fred Titmuss	FB	(England)	22	0	4	0	2	0	28	0
Stan Woodhouse	FW	(England)	13	1	1	0	0	0	14	1
Harry Yeomans	GK	(England)	4	0	0	0	2	0	6	0

=== Most appearances ===
Rank	Name	Pos.	League		FA Cup		Other		Total	
Rank	Name	Pos.	Apps.	%	Apps.	%	Apps.	%	Apps.	%
1	Bert Shelley	HB	41	97.62	5	100.00	2	100.00	48	97.96
2	Arthur Dominy	FW	40	95.24	5	100.00	2	100.00	47	95.92
2	George Harkus	HB	40	95.24	5	100.00	2	100.00	47	95.92
4	Bill Rawlings	FW	41	97.62	5	100.00	0	0.00	46	93.88
5	Tommy Allen	GK	38	90.48	5	100.00	0	0.00	42	85.71
6	Bill Henderson	FW	34	80.95	5	100.00	2	100.00	41	83.67
7	Tom Parker	FB	30	71.43	5	100.00	0	0.00	35	71.43
8	Jimmy Carr	FW	28	66.67	3	60.00	2	100.00	33	67.35
9	Alec Campbell	HB	26	61.90	5	100.00	0	0.00	31	63.27
10	Ted Hough	FB	27	64.29	1	20.00	2	100.00	30	61.22

=== Top goalscorers ===
Rank	Name	Pos.	League		FA Cup		Other		Total	
Rank	Name	Pos.	Gls.	GPG	Gls.	GPG	Gls.	GPG	Gls.	GPG
1	Bill Rawlings	FW	14	0.34	2	0.40	0	0.00	16	0.34
1	Arthur Dominy	FW	13	0.32	2	0.40	1	0.50	16	0.34
3	Tom Parker	FB	2	0.06	1	0.20	0	0.00	3	0.08
4	Fred Price	FW	2	0.22	0	0.00	0	0.00	2	0.22
4	Jimmy Carr	FW	2	0.07	0	0.00	0	0.00	2	0.06
4	George Harkus	HB	1	0.02	1	0.20	0	0.00	2	0.04
7	Stan Cribb	FW	1	0.16	0	0.00	0	0.00	1	0.12
7	Stan Woodhouse	FW	1	0.07	0	0.00	0	0.00	1	0.07

== Bibliography ==
- Chalk, Gary; Holley, Duncan (10 August 1987), A Complete Record of Southampton Football Club: 1885–1987, Derby, England: Breedon Books, ISBN 978-0907969228
- Chalk, Gary; Holley, Duncan; Bull, David (28 November 2013), All the Saints: A Complete Who's Who of Southampton FC, Bristol, England: Hagiology Publishing, ISBN 978-0992686406
- Juson, Dave; Aldworth, Clay; Bendel, Barry; Bull, David; Chalk, Gary (10 November 2004), Saints v Pompey: A History of Unrelenting Rivalry, Bristol, England: Hagiology Publishing, ISBN 978-0953447459
