= 1923–24 Southampton F.C. season =

English football club season

Southampton F.C.
1923–24 season
- Chairman: Tankerville Chamberlayne
- Manager: Jimmy McIntyre
- Stadium: The Dell
- Second Division: 5th
- FA Cup: Third round
- Top goalscorer: League: Bill Rawlings (19); All: Bill Rawlings (23)
- Highest home attendance: 20,000 v Manchester United (3 September 1923)
- Lowest home attendance: 7,000 (multiple games)
- Average home league attendance: 10,380
- Biggest win: 6–0 v Barnsley (19 January 1924)
- Biggest defeat: 0–3 v Leeds United (8 March 1924)
Home colours

The 1923–24 season was the 29th season of competitive football by Southampton, and the club's second in the Second Division of the Football League. Having finished in a mid-table position the previous season, the club made progress towards their goal of promotion to the First Division by finishing fifth in the second flight in 1923–24. The campaign started off relatively poorly, as the club won just two of their opening ten fixtures and found themselves around the middle of the table again. However, the team's performances began to improve, and by the middle of January they had made it to the top five in the division. With tough competition at the higher end of the Second Division, Southampton continued to drop points in key matches and finished the season in fifth place with 17 wins, 14 draws and 11 losses.

In the 1923–24 FA Cup, Southampton beat top-flight side Chelsea in the first round, followed by a home win over Second Division rivals Blackpool in the second. In the third round they hosted First Division champions Liverpool, holding them to a goalless draw at The Dell before being eliminated 2–0 at Anfield. The club ended the season with two games against local rivals Portsmouth, for the Rowland Hospital Cup and the Hampshire Benevolent Cup, respectively. Pompey won the former at The Dell 3–2, with Bill Rawlings scoring both for the Saints, and won the second at Fratton Park 2–0. The club also played three friendlies during the course of the season, losing 2–0 to Portsmouth in a benefit for trainer and former right-half Bert Lee in November, followed by two defeats to amateur club Corinthian in December.

Southampton used 24 different players during the 1923–24 season and had ten different goalscorers. The club's top scorer was centre-forward Bill Rawlings, who scored 19 goals in the Second Division and two in the FA Cup. Inside-right Arthur Dominy, who had finished as the top scorer the previous season, scored 11 goals in the league and three in the cup. Eight new players were signed by the club during the campaign, with seven released and sold to other clubs. The average attendance at The Dell during the 1923–24 season was 10,380. The highest attendance was approximately 20,000 against Manchester United in the second home game of the season on 3 September 1923; the lowest was around 7,000 for the 6–0 win over Barnsley on 19 January 1924, and for the 5–0 defeat of Clapton Orient on 5 April 1924.

The 1923–24 season was Southampton's last with chairman Tankerville Chamberlayne, who died on 17 May 1924, just two weeks after the last league game of the season. It was also the first campaign in almost 30 years without Ernest Arnfield in the position of secretary, after he left the club in August 1923 and his role was given to George Goss. Arnfield remained involved with the club, however, as he was later given a role as a member of the club's executive board. The season was also the club's last full campaign with manager Jimmy McIntyre, who would later leave partway through the following season (his sixth with the club) in December 1924.

== Background and transfers ==
Southampton manager Jimmy McIntyre bought and sold several players before the start of the 1923–24 season. One of the first departures during the summer was inside-forward John Cooper, who returned to his former club Darlaston after having made just five league appearances with the Saints during two seasons. Also leaving was outside-left Joe Clark, who was sold to Third Division North side Rochdale after losing his place in the first team to Len Andrews late the previous season. Two players were brought in to take Clark's place – Elias MacDonald from Burton All Saints in May, and Jimmy Carr from Reading in June. Also arriving in the summer were George Harkus, a half-back who joined from First Division side Aston Villa for £250, and Harold Pearson, a forward who was transferred from Brierley Hill Alliance in the Birmingham & District League. Half-back Alex Christie also left for Norwich City after just one season at the club, while Jack Elkes was sold to Tottenham Hotspur for a club record fee of £1,050.

Several more players were added to the squad during the season. Inside-forward Jock Salter joined as an amateur in September 1923, signing professional terms the following month. The club signed another amateur player in November, bringing in outside-forward Stan Cribb from local side Gosport Athletic, although he would not turn professional until the following season. The same month, winger Bill Henderson was signed for a fee of £500 from Luton Town after Sammy Meston – one of the club's two regular outside-rights – broke his leg during a match against Bristol City on 6 October. Before the end of the calendar year, inside-left Cliff Price was transferred from Third Division North club Halifax Town. The club sold two more players in the new year. In January, Herbert Lock left for Bournemouth and Boscombe Athletic, having last played in May. The next month, Henry Johnson also left The Dell to join top-flight side Queens Park Rangers, after scoring three goals in eleven appearances during the season so far.

Players transferred in

| Name | Nationality | Pos. | Club | Date | Fee | Ref. |
|---|---|---|---|---|---|---|
| George Harkus | England | HB | (England) Aston Villa | May 1923 | £250 | |
| Elias MacDonald | England | FW | (England) Burton All Saints | May 1923 | Unknown | |
| Harold Pearson | England | FW | (England) Brierley Hill Alliance | May 1923 | Unknown | |
| Jimmy Carr | Scotland | FW | (England) Reading | June 1923 | Unknown | |
| Jock Salter | England | FW | (England) Bitterne Sports | September 1923 | Free (Note: Jock Salter initially joined on amateur terms in September 1923, before turning professional the next month.) | |
| Stan Cribb | England | FW | (England) Gosport Athletic | November 1923 | Free (Note: Stan Cribb initially joined on amateur terms in November 1923, before turning professional in September 1924.) | |
| Bill Henderson | England | FW | (England) Luton Town | November 1923 | £500 | |
| Cliff Price | England | FW | (England) Halifax Town | December 1923 | Unknown | |

Players transferred out

| Name | Nationality | Pos. | Club | Date | Fee | Ref. |
|---|---|---|---|---|---|---|
| John Cooper | England | FW | (England) Darlaston | May 1923 | £200 | |
| Joe Clark | England | FW | (England) Rochdale | June 1923 | Unknown | |
| Alex Christie | Scotland | HB | (England) Norwich City | July 1923 | Unknown | |
| Jack Elkes | England | FW | (England) Tottenham Hotspur | August 1923 | £1,050 | |
| Herbert Lock | England | GK | (England) Boscombe | January 1924 | Unknown | |
| Henry Johnson | England | FW | (England) Queens Park Rangers | February 1924 | Unknown | |

Players released

| Name | Nationality | Pos. | Club | Date | Ref. |
|---|---|---|---|---|---|
| Robert Blyth | England | FW | May 1923 | (United States) Wonder Workers | |

== Second Division ==
Southampton's second season in the Second Division of the Football League started poorly, as the club immediately found themselves at the bottom of the league table following two 1–0 losses away to Bury and Manchester United, both of whom finished in the top six of the division the previous year. The team's form quickly improved, however, as they beat Bury in the return fixture 3–0 and went on a seven-game unbeaten run to move up to the top five in the league table. Despite this run of form, which also included a 3–0 win at home to The Wednesday, Southampton's main goal threat Bill Rawlings did not score until October, when he picked up the only goal in a 1–0 win over recently promoted Bristol City; during this period, recent signing Harold Pearson – who had replaced Rawlings in the side after the first six games of the campaign – was the club's top scorer with three goals. By the end of the year, Southampton were firmly placed in the First Division promotion race as they sat in sixth place in the Second Division table.

The club picked up their biggest win of the season on 19 January 1924, when they beat Barnsley (who had finished two places above them the previous season) 6–0 at The Dell. Bill Rawlings picked up half of the goals, with Henry Johnson (twice) and Arthur Dominy also registering on the scoresheet. The result saw the Saints move up to fifth in the league table for the first time since September. However, during February and March the team's results began to deteriorate, including two losses at the hands of league leaders Leeds United; club historians attributed this dip to the number of replays required in the team's FA Cup run, which also had an effect on the number of injuries in the side. With ten games remaining, Southampton had dropped to 13th in the table, two places lower than they had finished in 1922–23. Following their elimination from the FA Cup, the team's performances began to improve drastically. Starting from 22 March 1924, they went on an unbeaten run until the end of season, which included six wins.

The club moved back up to the top ten with a 1–0 win over fellow mid-table side Leicester City, the only goal scored by right-back Tom Parker, and moved up to seventh two weeks later when they beat Clapton Orient 5–0 thanks to goals from Rawlings (who scored his second hat-trick of the season), Dominy and Parker. Despite taking three points each from the games against Stockport County and Crystal Palace, the Saints were unable to move above seventh place in the table, as the sides above them continued to pick up wins. Finally they did so in the last two games of the season against Oldham Athletic, both of which they won 3–2. Rawlings scored all three in the first game – at Boundary Park – to bring his hat-trick tally to three for the season, and scored a final goal in the return game at The Dell to bring his league total for the year to 19; Dominy and Cliff Price scored the other two. Southampton finished the season in fifth place with 17 wins, 14 draws and 11 losses, three points away from the second promotion place.

=== List of match results ===
| 25 August 1923 1 | Bury | 1–0 | Southampton | Bury |
| | | | | Stadium: Gigg Lane; Attendance: 14,000 |

| 27 August 1923 2 | Manchester United | 1–0 | Southampton | Manchester |
| | | | | Stadium: Old Trafford; Attendance: 35,000 |

| 1 September 1923 3 | Southampton | 3–0 | Bury | Southampton |
| | Meston; Carr | | | Stadium: The Dell; Attendance: 15,000 |

| 3 September 1923 4 | Southampton | 0–0 | Manchester United | Southampton |
| | | | | Stadium: The Dell; Attendance: 20,000 |

| 8 September 1923 5 | The Wednesday | 1–1 | Southampton | Sheffield |
| | | | Own goal | Stadium: Hillsborough Stadium; Attendance: 20,000 |

| 11 September 1923 6 | Nelson | 0–0 | Southampton | Nelson |
| | | | | Stadium: Seedhill; Attendance: 8,000 |

| 15 September 1923 7 | Southampton | 3–0 | The Wednesday | Southampton |
| | Pearson; Dominy | | | Stadium: The Dell; Attendance: 10,000 |

| 22 September 1923 8 | Coventry City | 0–0 | Southampton | Coventry |
| | | | | Stadium: Highfield Road; Attendance: 10,000 |

| 24 September 1923 9 | Stoke | 1–1 | Southampton | Stoke-on-Trent |
| | | | Pearson | Stadium: Victoria Ground; Attendance: 11,000 |

| 29 September 1923 10 | Southampton | 1–3 | Coventry City | Southampton |
| | Carr | | | Stadium: The Dell; Attendance: 12,000 |

| 6 October 1923 11 | Southampton | 1–0 | Bristol City | Southampton |
| | Rawlings | | | Stadium: The Dell; Attendance: 12,000 |

| 13 October 1923 12 | Bristol City | 1–1 | Southampton | Bristol |
| | | | Rawlings | Stadium: Ashton Gate Stadium; Attendance: 12,000 |

| 15 October 1923 13 | Southampton | 0–1 | Stoke | Southampton |
| | | | | Stadium: The Dell; Attendance: 10,000 |

| 20 October 1923 14 | Southampton | 0–0 | Derby County | Southampton |
| | | | | Stadium: The Dell; Attendance: 11,000 |

| 27 October 1923 15 | Derby County | 1–0 | Southampton | Derby |
| | | | | Stadium: Baseball Ground; Attendance: 13,000 |

| 3 November 1923 16 | Southampton | 1–0 | Fulham | Southampton |
| | Own goal | | | Stadium: The Dell; Attendance: 10,000 |

| 10 November 1923 17 | Fulham | 3–2 | Southampton | London |
| | | | Rawlings | Stadium: Craven Cottage; Attendance: 15,000 |

| 17 November 1923 18 | Southampton | 3–2 | Blackpool | Southampton |
| | Dominy; Rawlings; Carr | | | Stadium: The Dell; Attendance: 9,000 |

| 24 November 1923 19 | Blackpool | 2–0 | Southampton | Blackpool |
| | | | | Stadium: Bloomfield Road; Attendance: 8,000 |

| 8 December 1923 20 | Southampton | 3–0 | Nelson | Southampton |
| | Dominy; Rawlings; Pearson | | | Stadium: The Dell; Attendance: 11,000 |

| 15 December 1923 21 | Southampton | 0–0 | South Shields | Southampton |
| | | | | Stadium: The Dell; Attendance: 11,000 |

| 22 December 1923 22 | South Shields | 1–2 | Southampton | South Shields |
| | | | Dominy; Rawlings | Stadium: Horsley Hill; Attendance: 4,000 |

| 29 December 1923 23 | Southampton | 2–0 | Hull City | Southampton |
| | Dominy; Carr | | | Stadium: The Dell; Attendance: 11,000 |

| 5 January 1924 24 | Hull City | 0–0 | Southampton | Kingston upon Hull |
| | | | | Stadium: Anlaby Road; Attendance: 9,000 |

| 19 January 1924 25 | Southampton | 6–0 | Barnsley | Southampton |
| | Rawlings; Johnson; Dominy | | | Stadium: The Dell; Attendance: 7,000 |

| 26 January 1924 26 | Barnsley | 1–1 | Southampton | Barnsley |
| | | | Johnson | Stadium: Oakwell; Attendance: 7,000 |

| 9 February 1924 27 | Bradford City | 2–1 | Southampton | Bradford |
| | | | Price | Stadium: Valley Parade; Attendance: 10,000 |

| 11 February 1924 28 | Southampton | 2-0 | Bradford City | Southampton |
| | Henderson; Price | | | Stadium: The Dell; Attendance: 8,000 |

| 16 February 1924 29 | Southampton | 1–1 | Port Vale | Southampton |
| | Dominy | | | Stadium: The Dell; Attendance: 9,000 |

| 1 March 1924 30 | Southampton | 0–1 | Leeds United | Southampton |
| | | | | Stadium: The Dell; Attendance: 8,000 |

| 8 March 1924 31 | Leeds United | 3–0 | Southampton | Leeds |
| | | | | Stadium: Elland Road; Attendance: 18,000 |

| 15 March 1924 32 | Leicester City | 0–1 | Southampton | Leicester |
| | | | Dominy | Stadium: Filbert Street; Attendance: 20,000 |

| 17 March 1924 33 | Port Vale | 1–0 | Southampton | Hanley |
| | | | | Stadium: Old Recreation Ground; Attendance: 9,000 |

| 22 March 1924 34 | Southampton | 1–0 | Leicester City | Southampton |
| | Parker | | | Stadium: The Dell; Attendance: 9,000 |

| 29 March 1924 35 | Clapton Orient | 0–0 | Southampton | London |
| | | | | Stadium: Clapton Stadium; Attendance: 18,000 |

| 5 April 1924 36 | Southampton | 5–0 | Clapton Orient | Southampton |
| | Rawlings; Dominy; Parker | | | Stadium: The Dell; Attendance: 7,000 |

| 12 April 1924 37 | Stockport County | 2–3 | Southampton | Stockport |
| | | | Shelley; Dominy; Rawlings | Stadium: Edgeley Park; Attendance: 11,000 |

| 18 April 1924 38 | Crystal Palace | 0–0 | Southampton | London |
| | | | | Stadium: The Nest; Attendance: 8,000 |

| 19 April 1924 39 | Southampton | 0–0 | Stockport County | Southampton |
| | | | | Stadium: The Dell; Attendance: 10,000 |

| 21 April 1924 40 | Southampton | 1–0 | Crystal Palace | Southampton |
| | Rawlings | | | Stadium: The Dell; Attendance: 10,000 |

| 26 April 1924 41 | Oldham Athletic | 1–3 | Southampton | Oldham |
| | | | Rawlings | Stadium: Boundary Park; Attendance: 6,000 |

| 3 May 1924 42 | Southampton | 3–1 | Oldham Athletic | Southampton |
| | Dominy; Rawlings; Price | | | Stadium: The Dell; Attendance: 8,000 |

=== Final league table ===
| Pos | Team | Pld | W | D | L | GF | GA | GAv | Pts |
|---|---|---|---|---|---|---|---|---|---|
| 3 | Derby County | 42 | 21 | 9 | 12 | 75 | 42 | 1.786 | 51 |
| 4 | Blackpool | 42 | 18 | 13 | 11 | 72 | 47 | 1.532 | 49 |
| 5 | Southampton | 42 | 17 | 14 | 11 | 52 | 31 | 1.677 | 48 |
| 6 | Stoke | 42 | 14 | 18 | 10 | 44 | 42 | 1.048 | 46 |
| 7 | Oldham Athletic | 42 | 14 | 17 | 11 | 45 | 52 | 0.865 | 45 |

=== Results by matchday ===
| Round | 1 | 2 | 3 | 4 | 5 | 6 | 7 | 8 | 9 | 10 | 11 | 12 | 13 | 14 | 15 | 16 | 17 | 18 | 19 | 20 | 21 | 22 | 23 | 24 | 25 | 26 | 27 | 28 | 29 | 30 | 31 | 32 | 33 | 34 | 35 | 36 | 37 | 38 | 39 | 40 | 41 | 42 |
|---|---|---|---|---|---|---|---|---|---|---|---|---|---|---|---|---|---|---|---|---|---|---|---|---|---|---|---|---|---|---|---|---|---|---|---|---|---|---|---|---|---|---|
| Ground | A | A | H | H | A | A | H | A | A | H | H | A | H | H | A | H | A | H | A | H | H | A | H | A | H | A | A | H | H | H | A | A | A | H | A | H | A | A | H | H | A | H |
| Result | L | L | W | D | D | D | W | D | D | L | W | D | L | D | L | W | L | W | L | W | D | W | W | D | W | D | L | W | D | L | L | W | L | W | D | W | W | D | D | W | W | W |
| Position | 22 | 22 | 14 | 16 | 16 | 10 | 5 | 6 | 5 | 9 | 7 | 8 | 8 | 7 | 10 | 7 | 10 | 6 | 7 | 8 | 8 | 7 | 6 | 9 | 5 | 6 | 10 | 7 | 7 | 11 | 12 | 13 | 13 | 9 | 10 | 7 | 7 | 7 | 7 | 7 | 5 | 5 |

Source: 11v11.com
A = Away; H = Home; W = Win; D = Draw; L = Loss

== FA Cup ==
Southampton entered the 1923–24 FA Cup in the first round against First Division club Chelsea, who they had knocked out in the second round of the previous year's tournament. The hosts initially led at Stamford Bridge thanks to a "brilliant individual goal" from Andrew Wilson, who had joined the London club from Middlesbrough for a British transfer record fee of £6,000 at the beginning of the season, but a goal from Arthur Dominy forced a replay at The Dell four days later. The Saints won the replay 2–0, with Dominy scoring from a Bill Turner free-kick and Bill Rawlings converting after a setup by Bill Henderson. In the second round, Southampton beat fellow Second Division side Blackpool 3–1 at The Dell, with a goal each from Rawlings, Dominy and Cliff Price sending them through to the third round.

The third round of the tournament on 23 February 1924 saw Southampton hosting reigning First Division league champions Liverpool, who had eliminated the previous season's cup winners Bolton Wanderers in the second round. The game ended in a goalless draw, forcing a replay at Liverpool's home Anfield four days later. Southampton played much of the game with ten players, after left-back Fred Titmuss suffered a "freak injury" in which a blood vessel in his eyeball was burst by a loose shoelace, and was forced to be taken off amid fear of permanent eye damage. The hosts opened the scoring shortly after half-time courtesy of Harry Chambers, but the ten men of Southampton prevented conceding more until six minutes from the end, when Dick Forshaw doubled his side's lead and secured the result.

| 12 January 1924 Round 1 | Chelsea | 1–1 | Southampton | London |
| | Wilson | | Dominy | Stadium: Stamford Bridge; Attendance: 34,586 |

| 16 January 1924 Round 1 Replay | Southampton | 2–0 | Chelsea | Southampton |
| | Dominy; Rawlings | | | Stadium: The Dell; Attendance: 17,000 |

| 2 February 1924 Round 2 | Southampton | 3–1 | Blackpool | Southampton |
| | Rawlings; Dominy; Price | | | Stadium: The Dell; Attendance: 18,000 |

| 23 February 1924 Round 3 | Southampton | 0–0 | Liverpool | Southampton |
| | | | | Stadium: The Dell; Attendance: 18,671 |

| 27 February 1924 Round 3 Replay | Liverpool | 2–0 | Southampton | Liverpool |
| | Chambers; Forshaw 83' | | | Stadium: Anfield; Attendance: 49,569 |

== Other matches ==
Outside of the league and the FA Cup, Southampton played five additional first-team matches during the 1923–24 season. The first was a friendly match against local rivals Portsmouth at The Dell on 24 November 1923. A benefit for former player Bert Lee, who was now a trainer at the club, the match ended in a 2–0 win for Pompey thanks to two goals by Willie Haines – one in the first half as the result of "some good combined work by the Pompey front line", and one in the second after the centre-forward "got right through on his own". A writer for the Football Mail reporting on the game observed that Portsmouth's work as a team featured "always more method" than that of Southampton. Two more friendlies also ended in losses – both against amateur club Corinthian in December.

Southampton ended their season with two more fixtures against Portsmouth. The first took place on 5 May 1924 and was for the second Rowland Hospital Cup. Portsmouth, having just won their first Third Division South championship, travelled to The Dell "anxious to demonstrate that they [were] capable of beating a Second Division side", according to a reporter for the Football Echo. The visitors took an advantage, as Stephen Dearn and Willie Haines put Pompey 2–1 up, with Bill Rawlings scoring in between the goals for the hosts. After losing Sammy Meston and Tom Parker, the Saints went 3–1 down thanks to a second goal from Haines, before Rawlings scored a second as well. Pompey made it three wins out of three against Southampton two days later, when they also beat them at Fratton Park to win the Hampshire Benevolent Cup. William Beedie scored early to give the advantage to the hosts, who dominated the remainder of the game and scored a second through Haines on 60 minutes.

| 24 November 1923 Friendly | Southampton | 0–2 | Portsmouth | Southampton |
| | | | Haines | Stadium: The Dell; Referee: V. G. Primmer |

| 1 December 1923 Friendly | Corinthian | 1–0 | Southampton | London |
| | Nicholas | | | Stadium: The Crystal Palace; Attendance: 3,000 |

| 26 December 1923 Friendly | Southampton | 1–2 | Corinthian | Southampton |
| | Price | | Ashton | Stadium: The Dell; Attendance: 7,000 |

| 5 May 1924 Rowland Hospital Cup | Southampton | 2–3 | Portsmouth | Southampton |
| | Rawlings | | Dearn; Haines | Stadium: The Dell; Referee: Albert Prince-Cox |

| 7 May 1924 Hampshire BC | Portsmouth | 2–0 | Southampton | Portsmouth |
| | Beedie 3'; Haines 60' | | | Stadium: Fratton Park; Attendance: 7,496; Referee: F. C. Winton |

== Player details ==
Southampton manager Jimmy McIntyre used 24 different players during the 1923–24 season, ten of whom scored during the campaign. The team played in a 2–3–5 formation throughout the campaign, with two full-backs, three half-backs, two outside forwards, two inside forwards and a centre-forward. Goalkeeper Tommy Allen and right-half Bert Shelley appeared in all 47 league and FA Cup matches. Right-back Tom Parker missed only one league fixture, while inside-right Arthur Dominy played in all but three. Centre-forward Bill Rawlings finished as the club's top scorer for the season, with 19 goals in the Second Division and four in the cups. Dominy scored 11 in the league and three in the FA Cup. Shelley was the club's only scoring half-back of the season, while Parker was their only scoring full-back of the season, scoring twice in the league.

=== Squad statistics ===
| Name | Pos. | Nat. | League | | FA Cup | | Other (Note: "Other" includes the Rowland Hospital Cup and Hampshire Benevolent Cup matches.) | | Total | |
| Name | Pos. | Nat. | Apps. | Gls. | Apps. | Gls. | Apps. | Gls. | Apps. | Gls. |
|---|---|---|---|---|---|---|---|---|---|---|
| Tommy Allen | GK | (England) | 42 | 0 | 5 | 0 | 2 | 0 | 49 | 0 |
| Len Andrews | FW | (England) | 7 | 0 | 0 | 0 | 0 | 0 | 7 | 0 |
| Arthur Bradford | HB | (England) | 2 | 0 | 0 | 0 | 0 | 0 | 2 | 0 |
| Charlie Brown | FW | (England) | 12 | 0 | 1 | 0 | 0 | 0 | 13 | 0 |
| Les Bruton | FW | (England) | 5 | 0 | 0 | 0 | 0 | 0 | 5 | 0 |
| Alec Campbell | HB | (England) | 29 | 0 | 5 | 0 | 2 | 0 | 36 | 0 |
| Jimmy Carr | FW | (Scotland) | 24 | 4 | 5 | 0 | 0 | 0 | 29 | 4 |
| Arthur Dominy | FW | (England) | 39 | 11 | 5 | 3 | 2 | 0 | 46 | 14 |
| George Harkus | HB | (England) | 14 | 0 | 0 | 0 | 2 | 0 | 16 | 0 |
| Bill Henderson | FW | (England) | 23 | 1 | 4 | 0 | 2 | 0 | 29 | 1 |
| Harry Hooper | FB | (England) | 4 | 0 | 0 | 0 | 0 | 0 | 4 | 0 |
| Ted Hough | FB | (England) | 4 | 0 | 0 | 0 | 0 | 0 | 4 | 0 |
| Michael Keeping | FB | (England) | 0 | 0 | 0 | 0 | 1 | 0 | 1 | 0 |
| Elias MacDonald | FW | (England) | 18 | 0 | 0 | 0 | 0 | 0 | 18 | 0 |
| Sammy Meston | FW | (England) | 7 | 2 | 0 | 0 | 1 | 0 | 8 | 2 |
| Tom Parker | FB | (England) | 41 | 2 | 5 | 0 | 1 | 0 | 47 | 2 |
| Harold Pearson | FW | (England) | 8 | 4 | 0 | 0 | 0 | 0 | 8 | 4 |
| Cliff Price | FW | (England) | 19 | 3 | 5 | 1 | 2 | 0 | 26 | 4 |
| Bill Rawlings | FW | (England) | 36 | 19 | 5 | 2 | 2 | 2 | 43 | 23 |
| Jock Salter | FW | (England) | 1 | 0 | 0 | 0 | 0 | 0 | 1 | 0 |
| Bert Shelley | HB | (England) | 42 | 1 | 5 | 0 | 2 | 0 | 49 | 1 |
| Fred Titmuss | FB | (England) | 37 | 0 | 5 | 0 | 2 | 0 | 44 | 0 |
| Bill Turner | HB | (England) | 37 | 0 | 5 | 0 | 0 | 0 | 42 | 0 |
Players with appearances who left before the end of the season
| Henry Johnson | FW | (England) | 11 | 3 | 0 | 0 | 0 | 0 | 11 | 3 |

=== Most appearances ===
| Rank | Name | Pos. | League | | FA Cup | | Other | | Total | |
| Rank | Name | Pos. | Apps. | % | Apps. | % | Apps. | % | Apps. | % |
|---|---|---|---|---|---|---|---|---|---|---|
| 1 | Tommy Allen | GK | 42 | 100.00 | 5 | 100.00 | 2 | 100.00 | 49 | 100.00 |
| 1 | Bert Shelley | HB | 42 | 100.00 | 5 | 100.00 | 2 | 100.00 | 49 | 100.00 |
| 3 | Tom Parker | FB | 41 | 97.62 | 5 | 100.00 | 1 | 50.00 | 47 | 95.92 |
| 4 | Arthur Dominy | FW | 39 | 92.86 | 5 | 100.00 | 2 | 100.00 | 46 | 93.88 |
| 5 | Fred Titmuss | FB | 37 | 88.10 | 5 | 100.00 | 2 | 100.00 | 44 | 89.80 |
| 6 | Bill Rawlings | FW | 36 | 85.71 | 5 | 100.00 | 2 | 100.00 | 43 | 87.76 |
| 7 | Bill Turner | HB | 37 | 88.10 | 5 | 100.00 | 0 | 0.00 | 42 | 85.71 |
| 8 | Alec Campbell | HB | 29 | 69.05 | 5 | 100.00 | 2 | 100.00 | 36 | 73.47 |
| 9 | Jimmy Carr | FW | 24 | 57.14 | 5 | 100.00 | 0 | 100.00 | 29 | 59.18 |
| 9 | Bill Henderson | FW | 23 | 54.76 | 4 | 80.00 | 2 | 100.00 | 29 | 59.18 |

=== Top goalscorers ===
| Rank | Name | Pos. | League | | FA Cup | | Other | | Total | |
| Rank | Name | Pos. | Gls. | GPG | Gls. | GPG | Gls. | GPG | Gls. | GPG |
|---|---|---|---|---|---|---|---|---|---|---|
| 1 | Bill Rawlings | FW | 19 | 0.52 | 2 | 0.40 | 2 | 1.00 | 23 | 0.53 |
| 2 | Arthur Dominy | FW | 11 | 0.28 | 3 | 0.60 | 0 | 0.00 | 14 | 0.30 |
| 3 | Harold Pearson | FW | 4 | 0.50 | 0 | 0.00 | 0 | 0.00 | 4 | 0.50 |
| 3 | Cliff Price | FW | 3 | 0.15 | 1 | 0.20 | 0 | 0.00 | 4 | 0.15 |
| 3 | Jimmy Carr | FW | 4 | 0.16 | 0 | 0.00 | 0 | 0.00 | 4 | 0.13 |
| 6 | Henry Johnson | FW | 3 | 0.27 | 0 | 0.00 | 0 | 0.00 | 3 | 0.27 |
| 7 | Sammy Meston | FW | 2 | 0.28 | 0 | 0.00 | 0 | 0.00 | 2 | 0.25 |
| 7 | Tom Parker | FB | 2 | 0.04 | 0 | 0.00 | 0 | 0.00 | 2 | 0.04 |
| 9 | Bill Henderson | FW | 1 | 0.04 | 0 | 0.00 | 0 | 0.00 | 1 | 0.03 |
| 9 | Bert Shelley | HB | 1 | 0.02 | 0 | 0.00 | 0 | 0.00 | 1 | 0.02 |

== Bibliography ==
- Cavallini, Rob (2007), Play Up Corinth: A History of the Corinthian Football Club, Stroud: Stadia, ISBN 978-0752444796
- Chalk, Gary; Holley, Duncan (10 August 1987), A Complete Record of Southampton Football Club: 1885–1987, Derby, England: Breedon Books, ISBN 978-0907969228
- Chalk, Gary; Holley, Duncan; Bull, David (28 November 2013), All the Saints: A Complete Who's Who of Southampton FC, Bristol, England: Hagiology Publishing, ISBN 978-0992686406
- Juson, Dave; Aldworth, Clay; Bendel, Barry; Bull, David; Chalk, Gary (10 November 2004), Saints v Pompey: A History of Unrelenting Rivalry, Bristol, England: Hagiology Publishing, ISBN 978-0953447459
