= Salter (surname) =

Salter is a Medieval English occupational surname, meaning someone who trades in salt. Its other meaning is connected to psalter. An English Salter family came to Portugal in the person of Edward then Duarte Salter, born in 1627, nobleman, son of John Salter, paternal grandson of Nicholas Salter, great-grandson of James Salter and great-great-grandson of Thomas Salter, also noblemen. It brings the following arms: argent, a floured cross sable, accompanied of four mullets sable, one in chief, one in point and one in each flank; crest: an owl proper, armed or. Others use: gules, ten billets or, four, three, two and one. In England they do not use the first of the described arms, which are the known ones in Portugal. It is said that the second arms correspond to a Chart passed by the England King of Arms, brought by Edward then Duarte Salter.

== Notable people with this name ==
- Ada Salter (1866–1942), British activist and politician
- Adam Salter (died 2009), Australian man killed in a shooting incident
- Albert Salter (1816–1874), Canadian surveyor
- Alfred Salter (1873–1945), British physician and politician
- Andrew Salter (psychologist) (1914–1996), American psychotherapist
- Andrew Salter (cricketer) (born 1993), Welsh cricketer
- Anna Salter, American psychologist and novelist
- Arthur Salter (judge) (1859–1928), British politician and judge
- Arthur Salter, 1st Baron Salter (1881–1975), British politician and academic
- Ben Salter (born 1977), Australian musician
- Bryant Salter (born 1950), American football player
- David Salter, English actor and theatre director
- David Ian Salter (born 1966), American film editor
- Deborah Klimburg-Salter, Austrian art historian
- Edward Salter, 17th century, English politician
- Ernest James Salter (1897–1959), Canadian airforce pilot
- Fannie Salter (1883–1966), American lighthouse keeper
- George Salter (1897–1967), American designer
- George Salter (cricketer) (1834–1911), English cricketer
- Hans J. Salter (1896–1994), American film composer
- Harry Salter (1899–1984), American music director
- Herbert Salter (1839–1894), English cricketer
- Herbert Edward Salter (1863–1951), English historian and clergyman
- Ina Salter, Apache politician and educator
- Ivor Salter (1925–1991), English actor
- Jake Clarke-Salter (born 1997), English football player
- James Salter (1925–2015), American writer
- James Arthur Salter (1881–1975), British politician and academic
- James Salter (swimmer) (born 1976), British freestyle swimmer
- Jan Salter (1936–2018), English artist and animal welfare worker
- Jo Salter (born 1968), English airforce pilot
- Jocelyn Salter (1901–1989), British navy officer
- Joe R. Salter (1943–2025), American civil servant and politician
- Jock Salter (1898–1982), British football professional
- John Salter (born 1985), American mixed martial artist
- John Henry Salter (1862–1942), English botanist and ornithologist
- John W. Salter (1852–1927), American farmer and politician
- John William Salter (1820–1869), English naturalist and paleontologist
- Joseph Salter (1816–1901), Canadian businessman and politician
- Julia Salter Earle (1878–1945), Newfoundland suffragist and labour leader
- June Salter (1932–2001), Australian actress
- Justin Salter (born 1984), American musician and record producer
- Kaidon Salter (born 2003), American football player
- Leionne Salter (1892–1972), American proponent of early 20th century revival movement
- Lewis Salter (1926–1989), American physicist
- Liam Salter (born 1993), English professional rugby league footballer
- Malachy Salter (1715–1781), English merchant and official in the New World
- Malcolm Salter (1887–1973), English cricketer
- Mary Elizabeth Turner Salter (1856–1938), American soprano and composer
- Mandy Salter fictional character in the BBC soap opera EastEnders
- Mark Salter (born 1955), American speechwriter
- Mark Salter (born 1968), American judge
- Mark Salter (born 1980), English footballer
- Martin Salter (born 1954), UK member of parliament
- Mary Jo Salter (born 1954), American poet
- Matt Salter (1976–2026), English rugby player
- Melville J. Salter (1834–1896), American politician
- Michael Salter (born 1967), U.S. contemporary artist
- Michael Salter, Australian criminologist
- Nick Salter (born 1987), Australian football player
- Richard Salter (disambiguation), several people, including

- Richard Salter (artist) (born 1979), British artist known for his military paintings
- Richard Salter (inventor), made the first spring balances in Britain
- Richard Salter (singer) (1943–2009), English baritone
- Richard Salter (writer), British writer who wrote Doctor Who stories including Short Trips: The Ghosts of Christmas

- Robert B. Salter (1924–2010), Canadian pediatric orthopedic surgeon
- Robert M. Salter (1920–2011), American engineer
- Roberta Semple Salter (1910–2007), American radio personality
- Sam Salter (born 1975), American musician and songwriter
- Samuel Salter (born 2000), Canadian soccer player
- Stephen Salter (1938–2024), Emeritus Professor of Engineering Design and inventor of the Salter duck
- Stephen Salter (architect) (1862–1956), notable architect of Oxford, Maidenhead, and the Isle of Wight
- Stephen Salter (politician) (1938–2006), Australian politician
- Susanna M. Salter (1860–1961), American politician, first woman mayor in the United States
- Tawgs Salter (active since 2006), Canadian songwriter
- Terence Macleane Salter (1883–1969), British/South African botanist
- Thomas Salter, official name of Tawgs Salter
- Timothy Salter (born 1942), English composer, conductor and pianist
- Torrey Salter (born 1988), American musician and songwriter
- William Salter (disambiguation), several people, including:

- William Sawtrey (died 1401), also known as William Salter
- William Salter (MP) (died 1404), English politician
- William Salter (painter) (1804–1875), English artist
- William Salter (minister) (1821–1910), Congregational minister in Iowa, USA
- William Mackintire Salter (1853–1931), philosopher and lecturer for the Ethical Culture Society, Chicago, Illinois, USA

== See also ==
- Solter
