= George Magoun =

George Magoun may refer to:

- George C. Magoun (1840–1893), chairman of the board of the Atchison, Topeka and Santa Fe Railway
- George Frederick Magoun (1821–1896), first president of Iowa College, now Grinnell College
