= John Callagher =

Scottish footballer

Personal information
- Date of birth: 3 April 1898
- Place of birth: Glasgow, Scotland
- Date of death: 25 January 1980 (aged 81)
- Place of death: Blackpool, England
- Height: 5 ft 11 in (1.80 m)
- Position: Centre half

Youth career
- St. Roch's

Senior career*
Years	Team	Apps	(Gls)
1921–1924	Bury	60	(1)
1924–1925	Southampton	1	(0)
1925–1926	Wigan Borough	8	(2)
1926	Norwich City	0	(0)
- Horwich RMI
- Mossley
- * Club domestic league appearances and goals

John Callagher (3 April 1898 – 25 January 1980) was a Scottish professional footballer who played at centre half for various clubs in the 1920s. The largest part of his career was spent with Bury of the Football League Second Division.

== Football career ==
Callagher was born in Glasgow and started his career playing Junior football with St. Roch's.

In June 1921, he moved to England to join Bury of the Football League Second Division. Callagher spent three seasons with the Gigg Lane club, helping them gain promotion to the First Division as runners-up in 1924. Following their promotion, Bury signed Bill Turner from Southampton in April 1924, with Stan Woodhouse and Callagher moving to the south coast as part of the deal.

He made his solitary first-team appearance for the Saints when he replaced Alec Campbell for the Second Division match at Stoke City on 1 September 1924. The match ended in a 2–0 defeat and manager Jimmy McIntyre called another new signing, Dennis Jones, into the side for the next match. Callagher spent the remainder of his time at The Dell in the reserves and in the summer of 1925 he was placed on the transfer list at his own request.

In June 1925, he was signed by Wigan Borough for a fee of £400. He made his debut for Wigan in a Third Division North at Ashington on 29 August 1925, when he scored in a 3–3 draw. He scored again in the next match, a 5–1 victory over Coventry City in which Tom Fenner scored the other four goals. Callagher retained his place for a further six matches before he lost his place to Bob Scorer.

In June 1926, Callagher joined Norwich City but left after six months without a first-team appearance and dropped into non-league football with Horwich RMI and Mossley.

== Later career ==
After retiring from professional football, he became a fireman in Blackpool, receiving a bravery award in 1938. He remained in Blackpool, where he died on 23 January 1980, aged 81.

== Honours ==
Bury

- Football League Second Division: Runners-up 1923–24
