= Henry C. Adams =

Henry C. Adams may refer to:

- Henry Cullen Adams (1850–1906), American farmer, public official, and U. S. Congressman
- Henry Carter Adams (1851–1921), American economist
