= 1918–19 Arsenal F.C. season =

English football club season

The Arsenal
1918–19 season
- Chairman: Henry Norris
- Manager: James McEwen
- London Combination: 2nd

In the 1918–19 season, the Arsenal F.C. played 36 games, of which it won 20, drew 5 and lost 11. The team finished 2nd in the league.

== Results ==
Arsenal's score comes first

Win	Draw	Loss

=== London Combination ===
Selected results from the league.

Date	Opponent	Venue	Result	Attendance	Scorers
7 September 1918	Queen's Park Rangers	A	3–3		
14 September 1918	Millwall	H	4–0		
21 September 1918	Fulham	A	2–1		
28 September 1918	Brentford	H	1–1		
5 October 1918	West Ham United	A	4–1	6,500	
12 October 1918	Tottenham Hotspur	H	3–0		
19 October 1918	Chelsea	A	1–4		
26 October 1918	Crystal Palace	A	1–2		
2 November 1918	Queen's Park Rangers	H	1–0		
9 November 1918	Millwall	A	3–3		
16 November 1918	Fulham	H	1–3		
23 November 1918	Brentford	A	1–4		
30 November 1918	West Ham United	H	0–2	7,000	
7 December 1918	Tottenham Hotspur	A	0–1		
14 December 1918	Chelsea	H	3–0		
21 December 1918	Crystal Palace	H	3–3		
25 December 1918	Clapton Orient	A	2–3	6,500	
26 December 1918	Clapton Orient	H	9–2		
28 December 1918	Queen's Park Rangers	A	2–0		
4 January 1919	Millwall	H	4–1		
11 January 1919	Fulham	A	1–3		
18 January 1919	Brentford	H	3–3		
25 January 1919	West Ham United	A	2–1	18,000	
1 February 1919	Tottenham Hotspur	H	2–3		
8 February 1919	Chelsea	A	2–1		
15 February 1919	Clapton Orient	H	4–0		
22 February 1919	Queen's Park Rangers	H	1–3		
1 March 1919	Millwall	A	3–0		
8 March 1919	Fulham	H	5–0		
15 March 1919	Brentford	A	0–2		
22 March 1919	West Ham United	H	3–2	20,000	
29 March 1919	Tottenham Hotspur	A	1–0		
5 April 1919	Chelsea	H	2–1		
18 April 1919	Crystal Palace	A	3–0		
21 April 1919	Crystal Palace	H	3–2		
12 April 1919	Clapton Orient	A	2–2		

==== Final League table ====
Pos	Team	Pld	W	D	L	GF	GA	GR	Pts
1	Brentford (C)	36	20	9	7	94	46	2.043	49
2	The Arsenal	36	20	5	11	85	56	1.518	45
3	West Ham United	36	17	7	12	65	51	1.275	41
4	Fulham	36	17	6	13	70	55	1.273	40
5	Queen's Park Rangers	36	16	7	13	69	60	1.150	39
6	Chelsea	36	13	11	12	70	53	1.321	37
7	Crystal Palace	36	14	6	16	66	73	0.904	34
8	Tottenham Hotspur	36	13	8	15	52	72	0.722	34
9	Millwall	36	10	9	17	50	67	0.746	29
10	Clapton Orient	36	3	6	27	35	123	0.285	12

(C) League Champions
