= Harold Hooper =

Harold Hooper may refer to:

- Harold Hooper (footballer, born 1900) (1900–1963), English footballer
- Harold Hooper (footballer, born 1933) (1933–2020), English footballer
- Harold Ridley Hooper (1886–1953), English architect
- Mr. Hooper (Harold Hooper), a character on Sesame Street

== See also ==
- Harry Hooper (disambiguation)
