= William Salter =

William Salter may refer to:

- William Sawtrey (died 1401), also known as William Salter
- William Salter (MP) (died 1404), English politician
- William Salter II (1732–1802), American politician from North Carolina
- William Salter (painter) (1804–1875), English artist
- William Salter (minister) (1821–1910), Congregational minister in Iowa, USA
- William Charles Salter (1823–1886), English clergyman, Oxford don, and principal of St Alban Hall
- William Mackintire Salter (1853–1931), philosopher and lecturer for the Ethical Culture Society, Chicago, Illinois, USA
- William Salter (cyclist) (born 2006), British cyclist
