= Richard Salter =

Richard Salter may refer to:

- Richard Salter (artist) (born 1979), British artist known for his military paintings
- Richard Salter (barrister), British barrister (King's Counsel) and visiting professor at the University of Oxford
- Richard Salter (inventor), who made the first spring balances in Britain
- Richard Salter (singer) (1943–2009), English baritone
- Richard Salter (writer), British writer who wrote Doctor Who stories including Short Trips: The Ghosts of Christmas
