= Harry Hooper (disambiguation) =

Harry Hooper was a baseball player.

Harry Hooper may also refer to:

- Harry Hooper (footballer, born 1900) (Harold Hooper, 1900–1963), defender with Leicester City, Southampton and Queens Park Rangers
- Harry Hooper (footballer, born 1910) (1910–1970), defender with Sheffield United
- Harry Hooper (footballer, born 1933) (Harold Hooper), winger with West Ham United, Wolverhampton Wanderers, Birmingham City and Sunderland
- Harry Hooper (cricketer) (born 1986), English cricketer

== See also ==
- Henry Hooper (disambiguation)
- Harold Hooper (disambiguation)
