= Frederick Keeble =

British botanist (1870 – 1952)

Sir Frederick Keeble
- Born: 2 March 1870; Westminster, England
- Died: 19 October 1952 (aged 82); Royal Borough of Kensington and Chelsea, London, England
- Citizenship: British
- Education: Alleyn's School; Dulwich College
- Alma mater: Gonville and Caius College, Cambridge
- Spouses: Mathilde Marie Cécile Maréchal (1898 to 1915; her death); Lillah McCarthy (1920 to 1952; his death)
- Children: One daughter
- Awards: Fellow of the Royal Society (1913); Commander of the Order of the British Empire (1917); Knight Bachelor (1922)
- Scientific career
- Fields: Biology; Botany
- Institutions: Victoria University of Manchester; University College, Reading; University of Oxford; Royal Institution

Sir Frederick William Keeble, CBE, FRS (2 March 1870 – 19 October 1952) was a British biologist, academic, and scientific adviser, who specialised in botany. He was Sherardian Professor of Botany at the University of Oxford from 1920 to 1927 and Fullerian Professor of Physiology at the Royal Institution from 1937 to 1941.

== Early life ==
Keeble was born on 2 March 1870 in Westminster, London, England. He was the second of six sons born to Francis Henry Keeble and his wife Anna Keeble (née Gamble). His father was the head of a furniture manufacturer in London. He was educated at Alleyn's School, an Anglican public school in Dulwich, London, and then Dulwich College, also a public school in Dulwich.

He then studied natural sciences at Gonville and Caius College, Cambridge. He was awarded first class honours in Part I in 1891, and second class honours in Part II in 1893. He graduated from the University of Cambridge with a Bachelor of Arts (BA) degree in 1893. He had been awarded the Frank Smart studentship in botany and, after graduation, went to study the subject in Germany under Wilhelm Pfeffer.

== Career ==
=== Early academic career ===
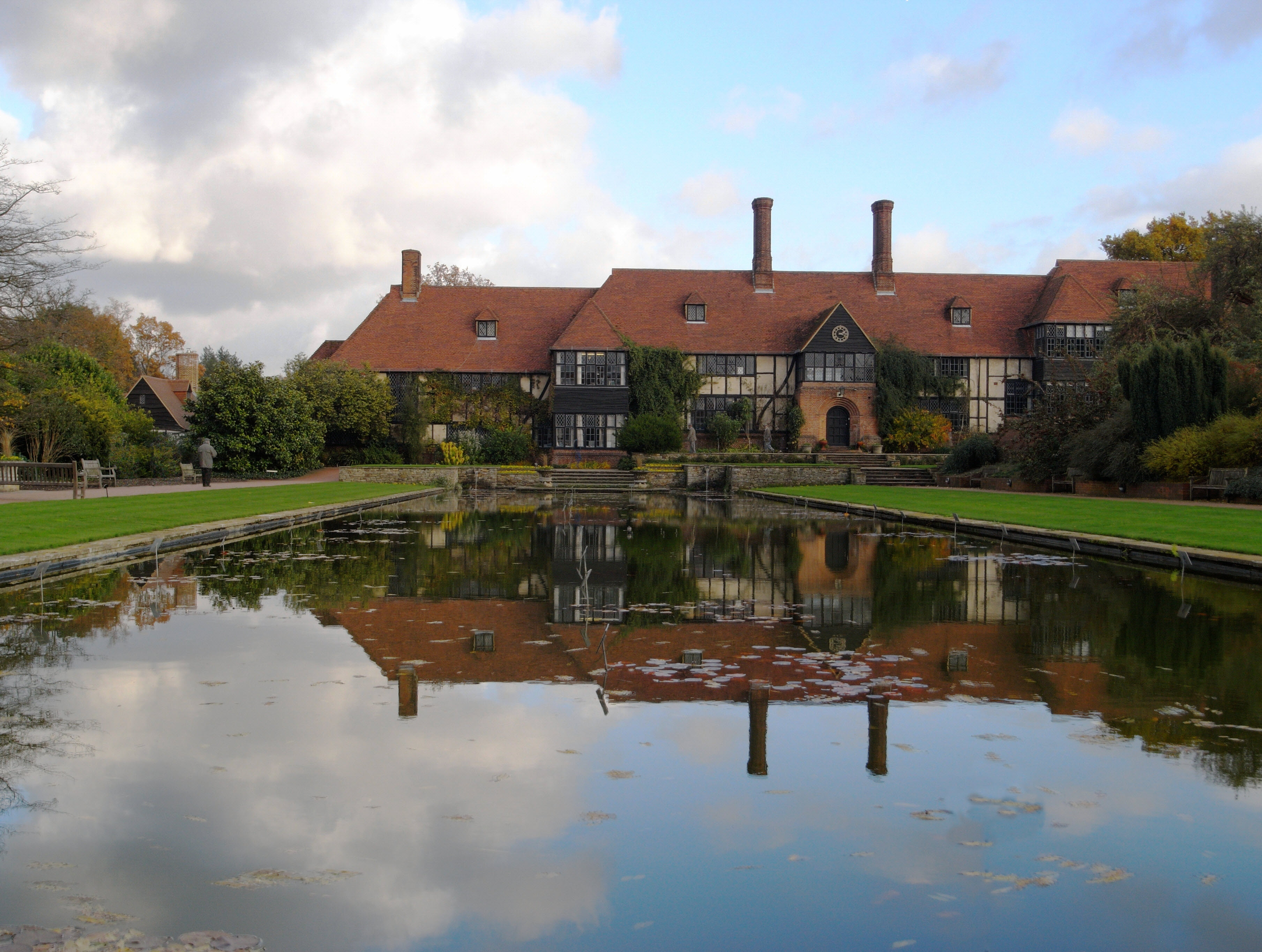
The laboratory building of RHS Garden, Wisley

In 1894, Keeble spent time in Ceylon researching plant physiology. He was interested in the hanging foliage of a number of tropical trees; specifically Amherstia, Brownea, and Humboldtia. This study produced his first publications which consisted of two academic papers published in 1895. Having returned to the UK, he was an assistant lecturer in botany at Owens College, Victoria University in Manchester and also taught at the University College of Wales, Aberystwyth (covering sabbatical leave of Professor John Henry Salter in 1896).

In 1902 he joined University College, Reading, first as a lecturer in botany, and from October that year as director of its horticultural department. He was promoted to professor in 1907 and served as Dean of the Faculty of Science between 1907 and 1909. During his time at Reading, he collaborated on publications with F. W. Gamble and E. F. Armstrong. In 1910, he was involved in a delegation from Reading to various universities in Canada and the United States of America. Their purpose was to investigate new methods of agricultural education and research.

In 1914, he left Reading to take up the appointment of Director of the Royal Horticultural Society's gardens in Wisley, Surrey. He had been recommended to the Council of the Royal Horticultural Society by Sir Isaac Bayley Balfour, a former Regius Professor of Botany.

=== World War I ===
When the United Kingdom joined World War I in August 1914, Keeble left the recently acquired position at RHS Garden, Wisley, to join the Board of Agriculture and Fisheries. In 1917, the Food Production Department was created. He transferred to the new department as Controller of Horticulture. That year, he wrote an article for The Times that advised on the growing of potatoes at home as part of the campaign for increased agricultural output. In a letter to the same newspaper, he drew attention to a newly created units of 'patriotic gardeners', formed by the Royal Horticultural Society. These experienced gardeners were to travel the country, advising allotments, schools and other organisations about food production.

In 1919, he was promoted to Assistant Secretary of the Board of Agriculture and Fisheries. During this post, he was instrumental in the establishment of the East Malling Research Station as an independent but government-funded horticultural research centre. The station was previously part of Wye College, an educational institution specialising in agriculture. He gave two lectures at the Royal Institution in 1919, concerning intensive cultivation.

=== Later academic career ===
In 1920, Keeble left the civil service and returned to academia. He had been elected to the appointment of Sherardian Professor of Botany at the University of Oxford in December 1919. His predecessor, S. H. Vines vacated the position on 31 December, and Keeble succeeded him on 1 January 1920. After accepting the chair, he bought a plot of land in Boars Hill near Oxford and built his own home; there was no house within the required distance from the city that was suitable in size for a university professor, with a garden suitable in size for a botanist. A keen gardener, he cultivated a large garden which could be used for his research, and also scenic enough to be used for extensive entertaining.

Keeble met Sir Alfred Mond when he was a guest to an event held at his Boars Hill home. In 1927, Mond convinced him to leave the University of Oxford and become agricultural adviser to the newly created Imperial Chemical Industries (ICI). He worked with a team at Jealott's Hill Agricultural Research Station, investigating the effects of fertilisation on both arable land and pasture. This research was published in 1932. He then relinquished his role as director of the research station, and continued his association with ICI as a scientific advisor and member of the company's executive council.

In 1938, he returned once more to academia as Fullerian Professor of Physiology at the Royal Institution. He relinquished the position upon his retirement in 1941.

== Later life ==
Keeble retired from academia in 1941. In retirement he moved first to Fowey, Cornwall before moving to London. He died in his home, a flat on Gloucester Road, London, on 19 October 1952.

== Honours ==
Keeble was elected President of the botany section of the British Association in 1912. In 1913, he was elected Fellow of the Royal Society (FRS). He was elected President of the agricultural section of the British Association in 1920. He was elected a member of the Royal Institution in 1924. In 1933, he was elected Master of the Worshipful Company of Fruiterers for that year.

On 4 June 1917, he was appointed Commander of the Order of the British Empire (CBE) 'for services in connection with the War'. In the 1922 Birthday Honours, he was appointed Knight Bachelor and was therefore granted the use of the title sir. He was knighted by King George V at Buckingham Palace on 8 July 1922.

== Works ==
- Keeble, Frederick (1910). Plant-Animals: A Study in Symbiosis. Cambridge: Cambridge University Press.
- Keeble, Frederick; Rayner, M. C. (1911). Practical Plant Physiology. London: G. Bell and Sons.
- Keeble, Frederick (1926). Life of Plants. Oxford: Clarendon Press.
- Keeble, Frederick (1932). Fertilizers and Food Production on arable and grassland. London: Oxford University Press.
- Keeble, Frederick (1936). Polly and Freddie. London: Heinemann.
- Keeble, Frederick (1939). Science Lends a Hand in the Garden. London: Putnam.
