= Solter =

Solter is a surname. Notable people with the surname include:

- Aletha Solter (born 1945), Swiss–American developmental psychologist
- Davor Solter (born 1941), Yugoslavian-born developmental biologist
- George A. Solter (1873–1950), American judge and lawyer
- Harry Solter (1873–1920), American actor, screenwriter and director
- Scott Solter, American musician

== See also ==
- Petra Sölter, also known as Petra Voge (born 1962), East German cross-country skier
- Salter (surname)
