= Jack Price (footballer, born 1900) =

English footballer

Personal information
- Full name: John William Price
- Date of birth: 9 June 1900
- Place of birth: Ibstock, England
- Date of death: 3 November 1984 (aged 84)
- Place of death: Coalville, England
- Height: 5 ft 9 1/2 in (1.77 m)
- Position: Full back

Senior career*
Years	Team	Apps	(Gls)
- Coalville Swifts
1920–1923	Leicester City	0	(0)
1923–1924	Bristol Rovers	5	(0)
1924–1925	Swindon Town	2	(0)
1925–1927	Brentford	12	(0)
1927–1929	Torquay United	31	(0)
- * Club domestic league appearances and goals

John William Price (9 June 1900 – 3 November 1984) was an English professional footballer who played in the Football League in the 1920s for Bristol Rovers, Swindon Town, Brentford and Torquay United. He played as a full back.

== Family ==
His younger brother Fred was also a footballer, who played at outside left for Leicester City, Southampton, Wolverhampton Wanderers and Chesterfield, whilst his uncle Cliff Price played at inside left for Leicester Fosse, Halifax Town, Southampton and Nottingham Forest.
