= George Frederick Magoun =

American educator (1821–1896)

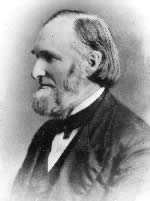

1st President of Iowa College
- In office 1865–1885
- Preceded by: Trustees of Iowa College
- Succeeded by: Samuel J. Buck (acting); George Augustus Gates (1887)

Personal details
- Born: 1821 Bath, Maine
- Died: January 30, 1896 (aged 74–75) Grinnell, Iowa
- Spouse: Elizabeth Earle Magoun
- Education: Bowdoin College, 1841; Andover Seminary, 1847

George Frederick Magoun (1821 – January 30, 1896), a member of the Iowa Band of Congregationalist ministers, was the first president of Iowa College (now Grinnell College), where he served as college president from 1865 to 1885.

== Life ==
George Magoun was born in Bath, Maine in 1821, where he attended Bath Academy before entering Bowdoin College. He graduated from Bowdoin in 1841. After Bowdoin, he taught at schools in Galena, Illinois and Platteville, Wisconsin from 1844-1846. Magoun continued his studies at Andover Seminary and completed his divinity degree in 1847.

Now an ordained Congregationalist minister, Magoun and other members of the Iowa Band moved to the Midwest to establish congregations. Magoun led congregations in Davenport, Iowa and Lyons, Iowa, also studying law in Burlington, Iowa. He became a founding trustee of Iowa College, then located in Davenport. In 1854 and 1855, as the town's relations with the college worsened, Magoun and other trustees pushed to move to the new town of Grinnell, Iowa. At the end of the Civil War in 1865, Magoun was inaugurated as the college's first president.

Magoun was a liberal president, permitting the teaching of evolution despite his personal disagreement with Darwin's work. As the first college president, he attempted to realize his vision for a college in the West:

The best cure for 'prairie-mindedness' is found in that spiritual-mindedness which creates scholars because it requires a knowledge of the deep things of our own nature and of God... A College prompts to great moral enterprise, nay it is itself a great moral enterprise.

In 1870, George Magoun married Elizabeth Earle, an 1860 graduate of Mount Holyoke Seminary who taught at Mount Holyoke from 1860 to 1867. In Grinnell, Elizabeth Earle Magoun was one of the founders of the town's oldest women's club, the "Busy Woman's Club", founded in 1870 and renamed in honor of Mrs. Magoun in 1896.

During Magoun's tenure as president, the college grew significantly; in 1882, there were two buildings and nearly 400 students. Despite a cyclone that year that destroyed the campus and killed two students, by the time of Magoun's 1884 retirement, three new buildings had been built.

George Magoun was succeeded by George A. Gates in 1887; Professor of Mathematics and Natural Philosophy Samuel J. Buck served as interim president from 1884 to 1887.

After his retirement as college president, Magoun took a professorship in Mental and Moral Science at Iowa College, teaching from 1884 to 1890.

Chicago Hall, on the Grinnell College campus, was renamed Magoun Hall in memory of President Magoun. Magoun Hall, which stood near the present buildings of the Bucksbaum Center for the Arts and Burling Library, was demolished in 1959.
