= Henry Hooper =

Henry Hooper may refer to:

- Henry Hooper (American football) (1883–1904), American football player
- Henry Northey Hooper (1799–1865), American manufacturer and merchant
- Henry Hooper, namesake of Hoopers Island

== See also ==
- Harry Hooper (disambiguation)
