= Frank Matthews (footballer) =

English footballer

Personal information
- Date of birth: 26 December 1902
- Place of birth: Wallsend, England
- Date of death: April qtr 1981 (aged 78)
- Place of death: North Cleveland, England
- Height: 5 ft 9 in (1.75 m)
- Position: Inside forward

Youth career
- Washington Blue Star
- Washington Colliery
- Usworth Colliery

Senior career*
| Years | Team | Apps | (Gls) |
| 1922–1923 | Blackpool | 0 | (0) |
| 1923–1925 | Barnsley | 34 | (5) |
| 1925–1927 | Southampton | 19 | (6) |
| 1927–1928 | Chesterfield | 2 | (1) |
| 1928–1929 | Usworth Colliery | ? | (?) |
| 1929–1930 | Carlisle United | 0 | (0) |
- * Club domestic league appearances and goals

Frank Matthews (26 December 1902 – 1981) was an English footballer who played at inside forward for various clubs in the 1920s.

== Football career ==
Matthews was born at Wallsend and as a teenager played for various colliery teams in his native north east before starting his professional career with Blackpool of the Football League Second Division in May 1922. With Matt Barrass well established at inside-left, Matthews was unable to break into the first team and moved on to Second Division rivals, Barnsley, in the summer of 1923.

At Barnsley, Matthews replaced Russell Wainscoat at inside-left after Wainscoat left to join Middlesbrough in December 1923. After two seasons at Oakwell, during which he made a total of 35 appearances, Matthews moved to the south coast to join another Second Division club, Southampton in May 1925.

Matthews initially played in the reserves but made his Southampton debut away to Sheffield Wednesday on 12 December 1925, when he replaced the out of favour Cliff Price at inside-left. Matthews scored on his home debut a week later, in a 2–1 defeat to Stoke City. For the remainder of the 1925–26 season he made the inside-left berth his own, linking up well with Jimmy Carr on the wing.

For the following season, manager Arthur Chadwick embarked on a massive team rebuilding and signed several new players, including Dick Rowley, Alf Bishop and Sammy Taylor all of whom could play in either of the inside-forward positions. After trying first Rowley and then Bishop at inside-left, Chadwick recalled Matthews for three games in September, before moving Taylor over from the right, with Rowley returning at inside-right. Taylor retained his place for the rest of the season, at the end of which Matthews was transfer listed for a fee of £50.

In the summer of 1927, Matthews was recruited by the former Southampton team captain Alec Campbell as one of his first signings following his appointment as manager of Chesterfield of the Third Division North. After making only two appearances for Chesterfield, Matthews returned to the north east, dropping back into non-league football.
