= Henry Carter Adams =

American economist and professor

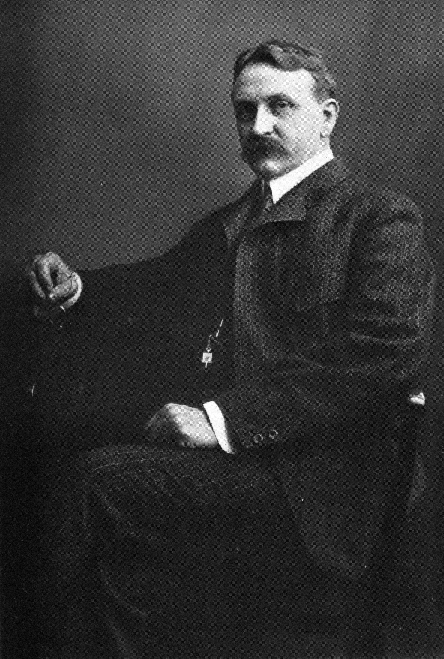
- Born: December 31, 1851; Davenport, Iowa
- Died: August 11, 1921 (aged 69); Ann Arbor, Michigan
- Citizenship: American
- Education: Johns Hopkins University (Ph.D.); Iowa College (LL.D.)
- Occupation: Educator (Economist)
- Years active: 1880–1921
- Era: Political Economy and finance
- Known for: Studies about economics, especially public debts

Henry Carter Adams (December 31, 1851 – August 11, 1921) was a U.S. economist and Professor of Political Economy and finance at the University of Michigan.

== Early years ==
Adams was born in Davenport, Iowa on December 31, 1851, son of Ephraim Adams and Elizabeth S.A. Douglass, and grandson of Ephraim Adams, of New Ipswich, New Hampshire. His father was a missionary of the "Iowa Band" from New England. He graduated from Iowa College in 1874, now called Grinnell College, which was co-founded by his father. Adams's middle name Carter acknowledged a benefactor of Grinnell College.

He was superintendent of schools at Nassau, Iowa, from 1874 to 1875, and became fellow of political economy at Johns Hopkins University, from 1876 to 1889. He went to Andover Theological School in 1878, then studied at Heidelberg, Berlin, and at the Ecole Libre des Sciences Politiques in Paris, from 1878 to 1879. He received the degree Ph.D., from Johns Hopkins in 1878, and the honorary degree LL.D. from Iowa College in 1898. Adams' degree was one of the first four PhDs to be awarded by Hopkins, which opened in 1876.

== Career ==
Adams became a lecturer at Cornell, from 1880 to 1883, and associate professor of political science there, from 1883 to 1887, also lecturer on political science at the University of Michigan, from 1880 to 1887, and professor of political economy and finance there from 1887 until his death. He also became a lecturer at the Johns Hopkins University from 1880 to 1882. While at Cornell, he delivered an address on "The Labor Problem," which resulted in his dismissal from the Cornell faculty when a critic accused him of "sapping the foundations of our society." In his first year at Michigan he becoming head of the newly created Department of Economics. "For him economics was more than a study of data and statistics; he saw it as the very bone and sinews of our national life...." At Michigan, he also worked with John Dewey.

He was appointed statistician of the Interstate Commerce Commission in 1887 and was in charge of the transportation department in the eleventh U.S. Census, 1890. He was elected a member of the International Statistical Institute, was president of the American Economic Association, from 1895 to 1897, vice-president of the American Statistical Association, secretary of the Michigan Political Science Association, and served as associate editor of the International Journal of Ethics.

== Personal life ==
In 1890, he married Bertha Wright of Port Huron and they had three sons, Henry Carter Adams Jr., later with the International Mercantile Marine at New York City, Dr. Theodore W. Adams, later on the staff of Doctor Reuben Peterson, and Thomas H. Adams, a senior in the University of Michigan.

Adams died on August 11, 1921, in Ann Arbor, Michigan.

== Works ==
He published:

- Lectures on Political Economy (1881)
- History of Taxation in the United States, 1789 to 1816 (1884)
- Public Debts (1887)
- The State in Relation to Industrial Action (1887)
- Relation of American Municipalities to Quasi-Public Works (1888)
- The Science of Finance (1888), which was later translated into the Japanese language.
- Statistics of Railways in the United States (6 vols., 1888–1898)
- Economics and Jurisprudence (1897)
- Description of Industry: An Introduction to Economics (1918)

Academic offices
Preceded by John B. Clark	President of the American Economic Association; 1895–1897	Succeeded by Arthur T. Hadley
