= Jock Salter =

Anglo-Scottish footballer

Personal information
- Full name: John MacGregor Salter
- Date of birth: 3 August 1898
- Place of birth: Bitterne, Southampton, England
- Date of death: 21 June 1982 (aged 83)
- Place of death: Bitterne, Southampton, England
- Position: Inside left

Senior career*
Years	Team	Apps	(Gls)
- Bitterne Sports
1923–1924	Southampton	1	(0)
1924–1925	Thornycrofts		
1925	Civil Service, Southampton		
- * Club domestic league appearances and goals

John MacGregor Salter (3 August 1898 – 21 June 1982) was an Anglo-Scottish professional footballer who made one Football League appearance as an inside forward for Southampton in 1923.

== Football career ==
Salter was born in Bitterne, Southampton and was enlisted in the British Army during the First World War. During the war he suffered from gas poisoning and never made a full recovery, finding regular daily training exhausting.

Having played local football with Bitterne Sports, he was signed by Southampton of the Football League Second Division in October 1923. He made his debut when he replaced Henry Johnson as inside left for the match at Fulham on 10 November 1923. The match ended in a 3–2 defeat and Salter was replaced by Len Andrews for the next match.

With only the one first-team appearance to his name, Salter was released in the summer of 1924 and took up employment with Thornycroft shipbuilders at Woolston.
