= Fred Price (footballer) =

English footballer

Personal information
- Full name: Frederick Thomas Price
- Date of birth: 24 October 1901
- Place of birth: Ibstock, England
- Date of death: 16 November 1985 (aged 84)
- Place of death: Coalville, England
- Height: 5 ft 6 in (1.68 m)
- Position: Outside left

Youth career
- –: Coalville Swifts
- –: Whitwick Imperial

Senior career*
Years	Team	Apps	(Gls)
1920–1924	Leicester City	4	(0)
1924–1925	Southampton	9	(0)
1925–1927	Wolverhampton Wanderers	39	(8)
1927–1928	Chesterfield	25	(6)
–	Burton Town		
–	Nuneaton Town		
–	Midland Red Sports (Coalville)		
- * Club domestic league appearances and goals

Frederick Thomas Price (24 October 1901 – 16 November 1985) was an English footballer who played at outside left for various clubs in the 1920s.

== Football career ==
Price was born at Ibstock, Leicestershire, and played his youth football with Coalville Swifts and Whitwick Imperial before joining Leicester City in November 1920.

After four seasons at Filbert Street, where he was considered to be a "clever player", Price moved to the south coast to join Southampton in May 1924 along with half-back Dennis Jones as part of an exchange deal that saw full-back Harry Hooper move in the opposite direction. At The Dell, Price briefly formed a left-wing partnership with his uncle Cliff Price in the early part of the 1924–25 season, before the return of Jimmy Carr. Price was unable to break back into the side and in May 1925 he asked for a transfer.

In the 1925 close-season, Price moved to Wolverhampton Wanderers for a fee of £250, where he remained for two seasons before joining Chesterfield in 1927.

== Family ==
Fred's brother Jack was also a footballer with Leicester City, Bristol Rovers, Swindon Town and Torquay United.
