= Cliff Price =

English footballer

Personal information
- Full name: Ernest Clifford Price
- Date of birth: 13 June 1900
- Place of birth: Market Bosworth, England
- Date of death: 30 July 1959 (aged 59)
- Place of death: Market Bosworth, England
- Height: 5 ft 9 in (1.75 m)
- Position: Inside left

Youth career
- Ibstock Albion
- Coalville Swifts

Senior career*
Years	Team	Apps	(Gls)
1917–1922	Leicester Fosse	28	(8)
1919–1920	→ Coalville Swifts (loan)		
1922–1923	Halifax Town	44	(15)
1923–1926	Southampton	59	(16)
1926–1928	Nottingham Forest	20	(5)
1928–????	Loughborough Corinthians		
- Nuneaton Town
- * Club domestic league appearances and goals

Ernest Clifford Price (13 June 1900 – 30 July 1959) was an English footballer who played at inside left for various clubs in the 1920s.

== Football career ==
Price was born at Market Bosworth, Leicestershire and, after playing as a teenager for Coalville Swifts in the Leicestershire Senior League, joined Leicester Fosse as a trainee in January 1917. After spending a period back with Coalville Swifts on loan, he signed as a professional in October 1920. Price spent a further two seasons with Leicester before transferring to Halifax Town in June 1922.

In December 1923, Price joined Southampton, immediately taking over from Len Andrews in the No.10 shirt. His debut came when he replaced Henry Johnson in a 2–1 victory at South Shields on 22 December 1923, Saints' first away win of the season. Price was described in the local press as "an inside-left of the studious type", whose passes were usually well-judged. He immediately struck up an understanding with his left-wing partner Jimmy Carr before, in January, injury put Carr out of the game for the rest of the season, with Elias MacDonald replacing him.

Price missed only two league matches for the remainder of the 1923–24 season, but missed the start of the following season, with new signing Stan Woodhouse being preferred by manager Jimmy McIntyre. Price regained his place after the first six games and on his recall linked up briefly with his nephew Fred Price who had recently been signed from Leicester City, before Carr returned to the side in November.

Midway through the 1925–26 season Price lost his place to Frank Matthews and at the end of the season returned to the Midlands to join Nottingham Forest.

After two seasons with Forest, Price dropped down to non-league football in October 1928 with Loughborough Corinthians and Nuneaton Town.

== Family ==
His nephew, Fred's brother Jack was also a footballer with Leicester City, Bristol Rovers, Swindon Town and Torquay United.
