= Albert Barrett =

English footballer (1903–1989)

Personal information
- Full name: Albert Frank Barrett
- Date of birth: 11 November 1903
- Place of birth: West Ham, England
- Date of death: 8 December 1989 (aged 86)
- Place of death: Cape Town, South Africa
- Height: 5 ft 10 in (1.78 m)
- Position: Half-back

Youth career
- Fairburn House

Senior career*
Years	Team	Apps	(Gls)
1921	Leytonstone		
1921	Middlesex Wanderers		
1923–1924	West Ham United	0	(0)
1924–1925	Southampton	1	(0)
1925–1937	Fulham	388	(12)
Total		389	(12)

International career
1929	England	1	(0)
- * Club domestic league appearances and goals

Albert Frank Barrett (11 November 1903 – 8 December 1989) was an English footballer who played as a half-back.

== Early and personal life ==
Barrett was born in West Ham, the third of four children, with two older brothers and one younger sister.

== Career ==
Barrett played as a schoolboy for Fairburn House, and then played for Leytonstone and Middlesex Wanderers in 1921. He signed for West Ham United as an amateur in 1923, leaving a year later (without making a first-team appearance) to sign as an amateur for Southampton. After one league appearance he moved to Fulham in 1925, where he turned professional. He played for the "Professionals" in the 1929 FA Charity Shield. He stayed with the club until 1937, scoring 12 goals in 388 league games.

He made one appearance for the England national team on 19 October 1929.

== Later life ==
Barrett was married with two sons. He worked as an accountant during his professional career, and in 1939 he owned a newsagents/tobacconists shop. After World War II he worked as the secretary of wholesale firm at Romford Market, before emigrating to South Africa in 1954.
