= Richard Salter (barrister) =

Richard Salter, KC (born 7 March 1956) is a British barrister practising from 3 Verulam Buildings and a visiting professor at the Faculty of Law at the University of Oxford where he teaches Corporate Finance Law and Legal Concepts in Financial Law to postgraduates.

== Legal career ==
Salter was called to the Bar in 1975 and appointed Queen's Counsel in 1995. He specialises in banking and finance law and regularly appears in landmark English cases before the UK Supreme Court including Office of Fair Trading v Abbey National, Belmont v BNY Corporate Trustee Services and Goldman Sachs International v Novo Banco SA. He was awarded Chambers & Partners Banking and Finance Silk of the Year in 2012.

Salter regularly sit as a Deputy High Court Judge and as a Recorder and as an Arbitrator in ICC and LCIA arbitrations. He is currently Reader of the Inner Temple and will be Treasurer in 2025.
