= Bob Scorer =

English footballer

Personal information
- Full name: Robert Scorer
- Date of birth: 5 October 1898
- Place of birth: Felling, Tyne and Wear, England
- Date of death: 1971 (aged 72–73)
- Position: Wing-half

Senior career*
Years	Team	Apps	(Gls)
1920–1921	Felling Colliery		
1921–1923	Hull City	5	(0)
1923–1925	Bristol Rovers	37	(0)
1925–1926	Wigan Borough	21	(0)
1926–1927	Crewe Alexandra	7	(0)
1927	Shrewsbury Town		
Total		70	(0)
- * Club domestic league appearances and goals

Robert Scorer (5 October 1898 – 1971) was an English footballer who played in the Football League for Bristol Rovers, Crewe Alexandra, Hull City and Wigan Borough.
