= John Cooper (footballer, born 1897) =

English footballer

Personal information
- Date of birth: 24 February 1897
- Place of birth: Wednesbury, England
- Date of death: 16 September 1975 (aged 78)
- Place of death: Wednesbury, England
- Height: 5 ft 9 in (1.75 m)
- Position: Centre-forward

Senior career*
Years	Team	Apps	(Gls)
19??–1921	Darlaston		
1921–1924	Southampton	5	(0)
1924	Notts County	0	(0)
- * Club domestic league appearances and goals

John Cooper (24 February 1897 – 16 September 1975) was an English footballer who had a brief professional career with Southampton in the 1920s.

== Football career ==
Cooper was born in Wednesbury, Staffordshire and joined Darlaston playing in the Birmingham & District League. Described as "the best inside-right in the Birmingham League", he topped the goalscoring charts whilst with Darlaston. He soon became the target for talent scouts from several top clubs, including Manchester United, Cardiff City and Sunderland.

In April 1921, together with his Darlaston teammate Henry Johnson, he moved on a free transfer to the south coast to join Southampton, then playing in the Football League Third Division South. Cooper was unable to live up to his reputation and found it virtually impossible to displace the Saints' veterans, Arthur Dominy and Bill Rawlings, from the forward positions. In his two seasons at The Dell, Cooper managed only five first-team appearances, failing to score.

In May 1923, he was placed on the transfer list at a fee of £200, but with no club willing to pay the fee he was eventually given a free transfer to Notts County, although he failed to make any first-team appearances before fading into obscurity.
