= Ernie King =

English footballer (1903–1993)

Personal information
- Full name: Ernest Stanley King
- Date of birth: January qtr. 1903
- Place of birth: Southampton, England
- Date of death: 1993 (aged 89–90)
- Place of death: Southampton, England
- Height: 5 ft 7 in (1.70 m)
- Position: Half back

Youth career
- Hamilton House

Senior career*
Years	Team	Apps	(Gls)
1923–1924	Bournemouth & Boscombe Athletic	0	(0)
1924–1927	Southampton	2	(0)
1927–19??	Guildford City		
- * Club domestic league appearances and goals

Ernest Stanley King (1903 – 1993) was an English professional footballer who played as a half back for Southampton in the 1920s.

== Football career ==
King was born in Southampton and was employed by the local newspaper, the Southern Daily Echo. He played football as an amateur with Bournemouth & Boscombe Athletic in the Southern League before joining Southampton in October 1924.

He signed his first professional contract in January 1925 and made his first-team debut when he replaced Bert Shelley at right half for a Football League Second Division match at Sheffield Wednesday on 12 December 1925. The match was lost 2–1 and George Harkus took over at right half for the next match, retaining his place for the rest of the season.

King's only other first-team appearance came a year later, when he replaced Ted Hough at right back for a 3–1 victory over Barnsley on 18 December 1926.

King remained at The Dell until the summer of 1927, when he joined Guildford City. Although he only made two first-team appearances for the Saints, he played over 100 matches for the reserves.
