= David Salter =

British theatre director

David Salter is an English actor and theatre director. His productions include Life of Galileo (Studio Theatre, Washington, D.C., and Battersea Arts Centre), The Comedy of Errors (Cambridge Shakespeare Festival), Playing Sinatra (New End Theatre) and Ghetto (Pleasance Theatre).

In 2006, he wrote and directed Broadway in the Shadows, a play based on the works of O. Henry, at the Grand Théâtre de Luxembourg and the Arcola Theatre in London.
