= John Henry Salter =

English naturalist and diarist (1862–1942)

- Born: 5 June 1862; Westleton, Suffolk
- Died: 5 August 1942 (aged 80); Dorset, England
- Occupations: professor of botany; ornithologist; writer

John Henry Salter (1862 – 5 August 1942) was an English naturalist and ornithologist. He was a professor of botany at the University College of Wales, Aberystwyth. Additionally, he published a book about the birds of Wales.

== Biography ==
John H. Salter was born in Westleton, near what is nowadays the RSPB Minsmere nature reserve, Suffolk.

Salter was a lecturer in botany at the University of Wales, Aberystwyth, from 1894 to 1899. He then became professor of botany within the same department, going on to hold the chair until 1903.

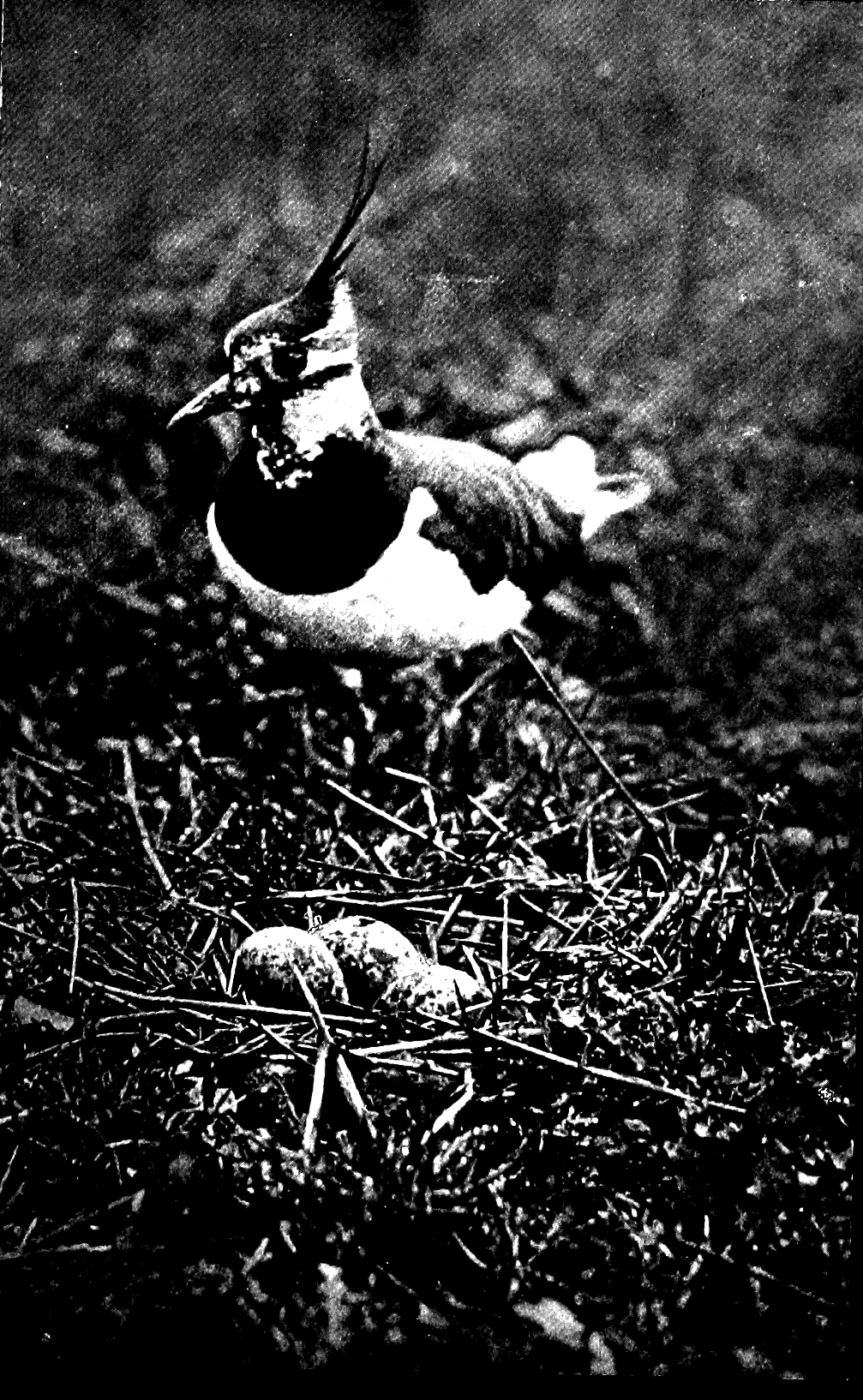
Photo of Northern Lapwing (Vanellus vanellus) published in Salter's book Bird Life Throughout the Year (1913)

Salter never owned a car and walked 20 miles a day. He was a non-smoker, teetotaller and vegetarian. He was a Quaker.

He died from a fall in his garden on 5 August 1942.

== Bibliography ==
Among Salter's publications are:

- Salter, John Henry (c. 1890). List of the flowering plants and ferns of Aberystwyth and neighbourhood. Aberystwyth: University College of Wales Scientific Society. OCLC 48115041 (all editions).
- —— (1899). Ornithological Notes from Northern Norway . The Zoologist, 4th series, vol. 3, issue 692 (February), pp. 54–71 – via Wikisource.

== Sources ==
- Newton, Lily (12 September 1942). "Obituary: Prof. J.H. Salter". Nature. 150: 314–315. doi:10.1038/150314b0.
- "Editorial: The work of the 'Kite Committee'" (PDF). British Birds. 66 (5). May 1973.
- Davis, Peter (July 1993). "The Red Kite in Wales: setting the record straight" (PDF). British Birds. 86 (7).
