= Harold Pearson (footballer, born 1901) =

English footballer

Personal information
- Full name: Herbert Pearson
- Date of birth: 7 January 1901
- Place of birth: Brierley Hill, England
- Date of death: October qtr. 1972 (aged 71)
- Place of death: Dudley, England
- Height: 5 ft 8 in (1.73 m)
- Position: Centre forward

Youth career
- Brierley Hill Alliance

Senior career*
Years	Team	Apps	(Gls)
1923–1924	Southampton	8	(4)
1924–1925	Coventry City	5	(1)
1925–19??	Nuneaton Town		
- * Club domestic league appearances and goals

Herbert "Harold" Pearson (7 January 1901 – 1972) was an English professional footballer who played at centre forward for Southampton and Coventry City in the 1920s.

== Football career ==
Pearson was born in Brierley Hill where he played for Brierley Hill Alliance in the Birmingham & District League.

In May 1923, he was signed by Southampton of the Football League Second Division as cover for Bill Rawlings. Pearson made his debut at The Dell against Sheffield Wednesday on 15 September 1923, scoring twice in a 3–0 victory. Pearson retained his place for three more matches before Rawlings returned to the side. Although he was "quick and determined", he never received enough chances to establish himself in the first team and at the end of the season he was placed on the transfer list, at a suggested fee of £250.

In the summer of 1924, he joined Coventry City where he only made five appearances before dropping down to non-league football.
