= Henry Johnson (footballer) =

English footballer

Personal information
- Full name: Henry Edward Johnson
- Date of birth: 19 November 1897
- Place of birth: Birmingham, England
- Date of death: 20 October 1962 (aged 64)
- Height: 5 ft 7 in (1.70 m)
- Position: Forward

Senior career*
Years	Team	Apps	(Gls)
1919–1921	Coventry City	2	(0)
1921	→Darlaston (loan)		
1921–1924	Southampton	38	(8)
1924–1926	Queens Park Rangers	50	(15)
1926–19??	Cradley Heath		
- * Club domestic league appearances and goals

Henry Edward Johnson (19 November 1897 – 20 October 1962) was an English footballer who played as a forward in the 1920s for Southampton and Queens Park Rangers.

== Football career ==
Johnson was born in Birmingham, and first came to prominence when playing for the British Army in 1919. He started his professional football career with Coventry City for whom he made only two first-team appearances, from where he was loaned to Darlaston of the Birmingham & District League. In April 1921, together with his Darlaston teammate John Cooper, he moved on a free transfer to the south coast to join Southampton, then playing in the Football League Third Division South.

He made his first-team debut for the "Saints" on 10 December 1921, taking Len Andrews' place at Inside-right in a 1–0 victory against Bristol Rovers. In the following match, Johnson scored twice in an 8–0 "thrashing" of Northampton Town, with Arthur Dominy also scoring twice and Bill Rawlings scoring four. This remains Southampton's highest margin of victory in a Football League match. Despite this early success, Johnson was unable to maintain any consistent form, and after nine matches he lost his place back to Andrews. He was recalled to the team in March, following the sale of Fred Foxall to Birmingham as part of a four-player exchange deal, but after two matches he was dropped in favour of Ken Boyes. After a run of four matches without a victory, manager Jimmy McIntyre recalled Johnson for the match against Aberdare Athletic with Johnson scoring the only goal. The team went on to win five of the last seven matches, enabling the Saints to take the Third Division South on goal average over Plymouth Argyle.

For Southampton's first season in the Second Division, McIntyre preferred Jack Elkes at inside-right; Elkes had arrived from Birmingham in March as part of the exchange deal with Foxall, but had broken his collar bone in his second appearance. Johnson only made sporadic appearances during the 1922–23 season as cover for the other forwards, with five of his nine appearances coming in the last three weeks of the season.

With Elkes having moved on to Tottenham Hotspur in the 1923 close-season, McIntyre recalled the ageing Len Andrews at the start of the next season, before handing the No. 10 shirt to Johnson after four matches. Johnson was to make only eleven appearances before losing his place to Cliff Price in February 1924. Shortly afterwards, Johnson was transferred to Queens Park Rangers.

At the Loftus Road club, Johnson took up a more central role, replacing Dick Parker at centre-forward. In the 1924–25 season, Johnson was the club's top-scorer with ten league goals as Rangers finished just above the Third Division South re-election places. During the following season, Johnson lost his place to Daniel Burgess, only making nine appearances.

In the summer of 1926, Johnson returned to the Midlands, finishing his football career back in the Birmingham & District League with Cradley Heath.

== Honours ==
Southampton

- Football League Third Division South champions: 1921–22
