= Horsley Hill =

Sports venue in South Shields, England

- Interactive map of Horsley Hill
- Location: South Shields, England
- Coordinates: 54.9898°N 1.4158°W
- Surface: Grass
- Record attendance: 24,348

Construction
- Closed: 1966

Tenants
- South Shields Adelaide (1908–1930); South Shields RLFC (1902–1904); South Shields RUFC; South Shields F.C. (1936–1950); Greyhound racing (1933–1966)

Horsley Hill was a football and rugby league ground and greyhound racing track in South Shields.

== History ==
South Shields RLFC were established in 1902 and played at Horsley Hill during the 1902–03 and 1903–04 seasons. They were voted out of the league at the end of the 1903–04 season.

The ground was then used by a rugby union club, with South Shields Adelaide moving to the site from their Stanhope Road ground in 1908. At the time the only spectator facility was a pavilion behind the eastern goal line, but by 1916 two stands had been built; an uncovered seated stand on the northern touchline and a covered main stand with a paddock in front on the southern touchline.

In 1919 South Shields F.C. were elected to the Second Division of the Football League. Horsley Hill underwent further development, with new terracing built, covered areas being installed behind the eastern goal and on the northern touchline, whilst the main stand was also extended. The first Football League match was played at the ground on 6 September 1919, with 18,000 watching a 2–0 win over Fulham. A record attendance of 24,348 was set for an FA Cup fifth round match against Swansea Town on 19 February 1927.

In 1928 the club was relegated to the Third Division North. By then attendances had dropped sharply, with just 1,239 watching a match against Rotherham United on 1 February 1930. At the end of the 1929–30 season the football club moved to Redheugh Park in Gateshead, becoming Gateshead A.F.C. The club's last match at Horsley Hill was played on 3 May 1930, with 1,752 spectators watching a 2–2 draw with Accrington Stanley.

After a new South Shields football club was formed in 1936, they started playing at Horsley Hill. However, disagreements with the stadium owners who ran the greyhound racing, they left in 1950 to play at Simonside Hall.

== Greyhound racing ==
A new company was formed in 1932 called the South Shields Greyhound Stadium Ltd with the intention to construct a greyhound track around the pitch. The final expenditure for the build went considerably over budget. The first race meeting took place on Saturday 11 March 1933 under the National Greyhound Racing Club rules of racing with the managing director listed as Mr S J Hawes, the General Manager was R Gilfillan and the Racing Manager was Major H Carew.

On 31 October the initial accounts were released showing a profit of £1,631 despite bank debenture loan repayments of £3,431 and income tax of £800. The company stated that the increased construction costs were incurred by club premises and totalisator building necessities and establishing training kennels outside of South Shields. Those kennels were at Strothar House Farm, six miles from the track in country surroundings and had accommodation for 200 greyhounds.

The original race distances created were 390, 400, 535 and 560 yards including hurdle races. In 1935 a new modern totalisator was introduced and tote indicators were squeezed in on the east side of the stadium. A third South Shields F.C. emerged in 1936, also playing initially at Horsley Hill.

Racing continued every Monday, Wednesday and Saturday until wartime when the racing schedule was changed to suit blackout restrictions. The venue also became well known for holding significant boxing bouts during this period.

After the war business boomed and in the summer of 1945 a South Shields greyhound called Mondays Son trained by P Moores travelled to Glasgow for the Scottish Greyhound Derby and won the competition.

The track was described in 1947 as having a 347-yard circumference with straights of 95 yards, the inside draw offering a slight advantage. Distances were now 400 and 500 yards behind an 'Outside Sumner' hare system with the principal events consisting of the Durham Cup and South Shields Cup.

It is known that Clapton Stadium Ltd had a financial interest in the track; the Managing Director H Garland Wells had been in the forefront of negotiations to purchase Reading Stadium in 1934 and Slough Stadium in 1936. It is not quite clear when the track came under the Clapton Stadium Ltd group but it is known that the Director of Racing in the 1950s was Eric Godfrey, the same man that was the Director of Racing at all Clapton Stadium tracks. The Racing Manager during this period was J Wightman. South Shields also raced under the 'combine' tag which allowed C-Licence owner-trainer races to take place.

In 1963 the South Shields Derby was inaugurated with significant prize money and the board invested in new ventures including a new restaurant, a bowling alley, a public house and a Jet filling station garage in the car park. The winner of the 1963 South Shields Derby was Thimble Rigger trained by Norman Oliver of Brough Park in a time of 24.40.

=== Track records ===
Distance yards	Greyhound	Time	Date
395	Diamond Glory	23.34	12.08.1936
400	Terrys Monarch	23.41	21.06.1946
540	Joyful Holidays	32.51	22.05.1939
565	Clementine	34.54	19.09.1938

== Closure ==
The 1963 plans had gone a little awry resulting in the board seeking state aid to help finish the project due to financial difficulties. Clapton Stadium Ltd then sold out to the Greyhound Racing Association in 1966 with South Shields closing on 1 March the same year, it is not known as to who closed it (Clapton Stadium Ltd or the GRA).

The stadium remained in situ with only the 'Dogs Bowl' bowling alley still used before the stadium and then the bowl was demolished. After demolition, the area was redeveloped for housing.
