= William Salter (minister) =

American congregational minister, public orator, social activist and historian

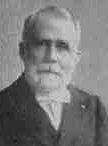
- The Rev. Dr. William Salter
- Born: William Salter; November 17, 1821; Brooklyn, New York, U.S.
- Died: August 15, 1910 (aged 88); Burlington, Iowa, U.S.
- Occupation: minister
- Spouse: Mary Ann Mackintire (m. 1846; died 1893)
- Children: 5, including William Mackintire Salter

William Salter (November 17, 1821 – August 15, 1910) was an American congregational minister, public orator, social activist and historian.

== Early life ==
William Salter was born on November 17, 1821, in Brooklyn, New York.

He graduated from Andover Theological Seminary in 1843, Salter and his companions — the so-called "Iowa Band" — went West to Iowa when it was only a territory to organize congregations, build churches and battle sin in all its infinite varieties. They were the single most distinguished Protestant group of their time, and Salter, through the years, emerged superior to them all, according to biographer Philip Jordan.

== Career ==
Salter began his ministry in Jackson County, preaching in the Maquoketa area. In 1846 he became the second pastor of First Congregational Church in Burlington, Iowa, and remained senior minister of this congregation for more than 60 years until his death in 1910.

According to Jordan, "Salter played a dominant role in transforming the slovenly community, where filth filled the alleys, pigs wallowed in streets and cows grazed on the public square, into a prosperous and cultivated 20th-century Burlington." He was instrumental in establishing a public library and getting a library building built. He served as president of the school board. He was a trustee of the State University of Iowa (now the University of Iowa), which awarded him an honorary doctorate.

Prior to the Civil War, Salter not only allied himself with anti-slavery societies, but also operated an Underground Railroad station to aid slaves fleeing to freedom. Runaways found sanctuary at his South Hill home and in a hidden room beneath his church. During the war, Salter visited Union troops as far south as Atlanta.

Social Gospel theologian George Herron served briefly with Salter as associate minister in 1892 and 1893, before taking a position as professor of Applied Christianity at Grinnell College.

In 1876 he compiled and had published a compilation of the letters and speeches of James W. Grimes, who served Iowa in the U.S.Senate and voted against convicting President Andrew Johnson.

== Personal life ==
Salter married Mary Ann Mackintire. They had five children, including William Mackintire Salter, Sumner Salter and George B. Salter. His wife died on June 12, 1893, after a tree fell on the couple. Salter himself was severely injured. William Mackintire Salter was a philosopher and lecturer for the Ethical Culture Society in Chicago.

Salter died on August 15, 1910, in Burlington.

== Legacy ==
A Burlington grade school was named after him, and the Congregational student center at the University of Iowa bears his name. Salter's personal library of roughly 450 books and a number of his published works were initially held by Burlington Public Library and are currently held by Grinnell College, the academic institution founded by the Iowa Band. His portrait hangs in the Des Moines County Heritage Center.
