= Richard Salter (artist) =

British artist

Richard Salter (born 1979, West Yorkshire, England) is a British artist who is currently serving with in the Royal Corps of Signals, British Army.

Richard Salter

== Life and work ==
Salter has a BA (Hons) in fine art. He was born in West Yorkshire. He has served 21 years in the British Army and was medically discharged in 2017. He held his first solo exhibition in Dorset in 2008, and has since painted celebrities, used actors as models, featured in Art magazines and won various awards. His work can be found in www.gallery21.co.uk based in Salisbury and he has exhibited in the Mall Galleries, London with the Armed Forces Art Society and in Salisbury with the Army Art Society.

He has more recently exhibited work in Tate Britain and also was a finalist on the BBC's Big Painting Challenge.

Between 2000-05, during Salters early career before becoming a known artist, he exhibited abstract work under the pseudonym ‘Gekko’.

== Awards ==
- 2016 National Army Museum Award
- 2015 First Prize AAS, presented by Royal Academician Emma Stibbon
- 2015 Finalist, BBC's Big Painting Challenge
- 2013 War Artist of the Year RU
- 2013 Best in Show RU Army Arts Exhibition, Salisbury
- 2012 Armed Forces Art Society Award
- 2011 National Army Museum Templar Award for "Operator" painting

== Collectors ==
- National Army Museum, London
- Kohima Museum, York
- Private Collections
