= Elias MacDonald =

English footballer

Personal information
- Date of birth: 11 April 1898
- Place of birth: Beswick, Manchester, England
- Date of death: 4 April 1978 (aged 79)
- Place of death: Rochester, Kent, England
- Height: 5 ft 8 in (1.73 m)
- Position: Outside left

Youth career
- Ancoats Lads Club

Senior career*
| Years | Team | Apps | (Gls) |
| 1920–1921 | Derby County | 0 | (0) |
| 1921–1923 | Burton All Saints | | |
| 1923–1924 | Southampton | 18 | (0) |
| 1924–1925 | Southend United | 37 | (1) |
| 1925–1926 | Southport | 42 | (5) |
| 1926 | Doncaster Rovers | 9 | (0) |
| 1926–1929 | Barrow | 97 | (13) |
| 1929–1930 | Chorley | | |
| – | Ulverston Town | | |
| – | Chorley | | |
| – | Morecambe | | |
| – | Rolls-Royce Welfare | | |
- * Club domestic league appearances and goals

Elias MacDonald (11 April 1898 – 4 April 1978) was an English footballer who played at outside left for various clubs in the 1920s.

== Football career ==
MacDonald was born in Beswick, Manchester and played his early football for Ancoats Lads Club, as well as representing Manchester Schools. After leaving school, he was employed by Rolls-Royce at Derby from where he joined Derby County in 1920, although he made no first-team appearances. The following year, he joined Burton All Saints where he was spotted by a scout from Southampton.

Described as a "fine winger", he joined Southampton in May 1923, making his first-team debut in a Second Division match at home to Barnsley on 19 January 1924, when he replaced the injured Jimmy Carr. MacDonald retained his place on the left wing for the remainder of the season, in partnership with Cliff Price, but failed to score. At the end of the season, he was placed on the transfer list at a fee of £250, but in June he moved to Southend United of the Third Division South, with the fee being waived.

After a season at Southend, MacDonald moved to the Third Division North with Southport and then Doncaster Rovers, before settling at Barrow in December 1926. Over the next three seasons, he was a virtual ever-present making 100 appearances for the Cumberland club before dropping down to non-league football in 1929.
