= William Mackintire Salter =

American philosopher (1853–1931)

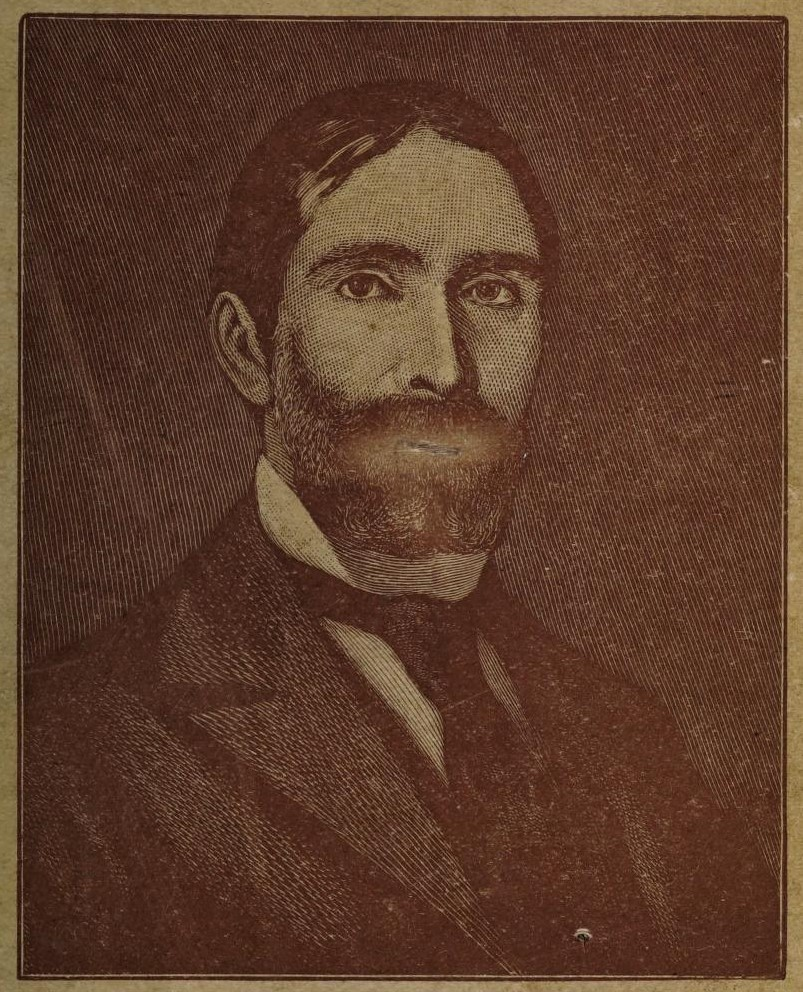
- Born: January 30, 1853
- Died: July 18, 1931 (aged 78); Silver Lake, New Hampshire, U.S.
- Education: Knox College (B.A., M.A.); Harvard Divinity School (B.D.)
- Occupations: Writer; educator
- Spouse: Mary Gibbens (m. 1885)
- Children: 2
- Father: William Salter

William Mackintire Salter (January 30, 1853 – July 18, 1931) was the author of several books on philosophy and a critical and enduring major classic on Nietzsche. He was also a special lecturer for the Department of Philosophy in the University of Chicago and a pioneer in the Ethical movement.

== Life and work ==
William Mackintire Salter was born in Burlington, Iowa on January 30, 1853. Salter's parents were William Salter, a long-serving Congregational minister, and Mary Ann Salter (née Mackintire). Salter obtained his BA and MA degrees from Knox College in Illinois in 1871 and 1874 respectively. He also attended Yale Divinity School, and received a Bachelor of Divinity degree from Harvard University in 1876. Over the following two years, Salter studied at the University of Göttingen, Germany, and later (1881-2) at Columbia University.

Salter married Mary Gibbens in 1885. Mary's sister, Alice Howe Gibbens, was the wife of philosopher and psychologist William James. Their first child, Eliza Webb, was born on 20 January 1888. On 2 December 1889 she died of the measles, and they later adopted Frank Gray, renaming him John Randall Salter.

Salter founded, and served as lecturer at, the Ethical Culture Society in Chicago. Between 1892 and 1897, following nearly a decade in Chicago, he was a lecturer for the Ethical Culture Society in Philadelphia. From 1897 to 1907 he was again in Chicago where, from 1909 to 1913 he was a special lecturer in philosophy at the University of Chicago.

== Influence ==
The Ethical movement's founder Felix Adler, a friend and associate of Salter's, described him as 'one of the crown jewels of Ethical Culture'. With other Ethical Culture leaders, he signed the call for the 1909 National Negro Conference, which led to the founding of the National Association for the Advancement of Colored People. Salter's book, Ethical Religion, influenced Mohandas K. Gandhi, who published a summary in Gujarati in 1907.

Salter has been called 'perhaps the most perceptive and prescient' of Nietzsche's early interpreters.

== Death ==
Salter died on July 18, 1931, at his summer home in Silver Lake, New Hampshire. His wife, adopted son, and two brothers (Sumner and George Salter) survived him. He was cremated and his ashes buried at his New Hampshire Hilltop in Silver Lake.

== Works ==
- Do the ethics of Jesus satisfy the needs of our time? (1882)
- Prayer and an ethical view of life (1882)
- Why Unitarianism Does Not Satisfy Us (1883)
- The ethical movement; its philosophical basis; its general aims, etc. Three addresses (1884)
- Ethical Religion (1889)
- First Steps in Philosophy (Physical and Ethical) (1892)
- Anarchy or Government? An Inquiry in Fundamental Politics (1895)
- The Conflict of the Catholic Church with the French republic (1907)
- Nietzsche the thinker; a study (1917) (at Internet Archive)

== See also ==
- American philosophy
- Ethical movement
- Felix Adler (professor)
- List of American philosophers
