= Iowa Band =

Christian missionary initiative in the United States

The Iowa Band was a home Christian missionary initiative that worked in the northwestern frontier of the United States in the 19th century.

== History ==
The Iowa Band started as a group of 12 Christian ministers, all trained at Andover Theological Seminary, who agreed to carry the gospel into a frontier region. The band was a part of the American Home Missionary Society that included Congregationalists, Presbyterians, and Baptists as members. Some prominent men from this organization of home missionaries were Daniel Lane (leader of the Keosauqua Academy where he stayed and trained young people), Harvey Adams, Erastus Ripley, Horace Hutchinson, Alden B. Robbins, William Salter (Influential in starting Iowa College), Edwin B. Turner, Benjamin A. Spaulding (stationed in Muscatine), William Hammond, James J. Hill (Missionary to Mt. Pleasant), Ebenezer Alden, Ephriam Adams (scribe) and C.E. Brown who came earlier in the Maquoketa area. (Bates was an Iowa native that joined.)

The spirit with which these home missionaries went forth was ably expressed by one of the Iowa Band when he said: "The understanding is among us all, that we go west not for a temporary purpose, unless the great Head of the Church shall make it so. We go to remain permanently -- to live and die there -- and God grant us grace to carry out this purpose."

The group arrived in 1843, and each minister selected a different town in which to establish a congregation. Many stayed in the above mention towns while others continued on west past Iowa into Kansas and Nebraska. The Iowa Band's motto was "each a church; all a college."

After a number of years when each minister worked independently, the ministers collectively helped to establish Iowa College in Davenport. Later board officials moved the college to Grinnell and changed its name to Grinnell College. The letters and journal of William Salter, a member of the Iowa Band, depict the commitment and philosophy of this small group. At one point, Salter wrote the following to his fiancée back East: "I shall aim to show that the West will be just what others make it, and that they which work the hardest and do the most for it shall have it. Prayer and pain will save the West and the Country is worth it, "Let God arise, let his enemies be scattered. "

While attending Charles Finney’s Church (Oberlin, OH) in 1842 at an American Home Missionary Society Conference ,5 of the 12 men received a what they believed was a prophecy that was the mandate of the Puritans and God’s purpose for America. Beecher prophesied,” if this nation is, in the providence of God, destined to lead the way in moral and political emancipation of the world; it is time she understood her high calling, and was harnessed for the work."

The 5 men took that confirmation of the call and with Beecher’s laying on of hands, went to Iowa in 1843, and were set apart in a training academy in Keosauqua, and set out for the NE corner to establish, “ God's Living Word in the hearts of all men”.

In 1845, 3 of the 5 men of the Iowa Band moved on further to the west, leaving others, including C.E. Brown and John Bates, new recruits of the work in Iowa.

During the American Civil War the church was at a decision point: Bates addressed denominational leaders and ministers in the state at the time; “Brethren, we need more of the spirit of God, more of a Missionary spirit, individual zeal, and enlarged benevolence in sustaining Sabbath Schools, and a better support could and ought to be given by the Churches to those ministers who labor in word and doctrine. Let us take heed that we are not absorbed too much in war. We are Christians as well as patriots. The first honor is to be self-denying and ready to die as martyrs in the cause of Christ; the next honor is to be self-denying and ready to die as patriots in the cause of our county.”

By 1859, the religious movement led by Charles Brown and John Bates began to show signs of slowing down. Brown states, “It has been a year of very limited spiritual fruitage, and great destitution, the church has fallen asleep”.

== Members ==
- Ephraim Adams (February 15, 1818 – 1907)
- Harvey Adams (January 16, 1809 – 1896)
- Ebenezer Alden, Jr. (August 10, 1819 – 1889)
- James Jeremiah Hill (May 29, 1815 – 1870)
- Horace Hutchinson (August 10, 1817 – 1846)
- Daniel Lane (March 10, 1813 – 1890)
- Erastus Ripley (March 15, 1815 – 1870)
- Alden Burrill Robbins (February 18, 1817 – 1896)
- William Salter (November 17, 1821 – August 15, 1910)
- Benjamin Adams Spaulding (January 20, 1815 – 1867)
- Edwin Bela Turner (October 2, 1812 – 1895)

== What the Iowa Band established ==
1. Iowa College 1846
2. Grinnell College 1859
3. First Christian State Convention 1845
4. Over 600 churches
5. 200 schools and bible classes
6. Organized the civil government in Burlington and Iowa City and Des Moines
7. Established a sending and training center for young people in; Keosauqua, Denmark, Maquoketa, Burlington, and Muscatine. 1845 - 1857
8. Trained nearly 1,000 Men and Women ministers to go into the Western United States
