= Dennis Jones (footballer, born 1894) =

English footballer

Personal information
- Date of birth: 14 May 1894
- Place of birth: Shirebrook, England
- Date of death: 7 December 1961 (aged 67)
- Place of death: Bolsover, England
- Height: 5 ft 7 in (1.70 m)
- Position: Half back

Senior career*
Years	Team	Apps	(Gls)
- Shirebrook
1921–1924	Leicester City	64	(2)
1924–1925	Southampton	7	(0)
1925–1926	Mansfield Town		
1926–1927	Shirebrook		
1927–1928	Sutton Town		
1928–1929	Wombwell		
- * Club domestic league appearances and goals

Dennis Jones (14 May 1894 – 7 December 1961) was an English footballer who played at half back for various clubs in the 1920s.

== Football career ==
Jones was born in Shirebrook and, after several years playing at centre-half in the Central Alliance League for his home-town team, joined Leicester City in June 1921, where he was switched to right-half.

After three seasons at Filbert Street, Jones moved to the south coast to join Southampton in May 1924 along with winger Fred Price as part of an exchange deal that saw full-back Harry Hooper move in the opposite direction. At The Dell, Jones found it hard to break into the first-team with Bert Shelley, Alec Campbell and George Harkus all well-established as the three half-backs. Jones replaced Campbell for four matches in September 1924, but made only three further appearances before returning to the Midlands at the end of the season.

Jones joined Mansfield Town in the summer of 1925 where he spent a season before dropping down to non-league football with spells at Shirebrook, Sutton Town and Wombwell, before becoming a scout for Leicester City and Mansfield Town.

After the Second World War, Jones joined Mansfield Town as a trainer.
