= Jimmy Carr (footballer) =

Scottish footballer

Personal information
- Full name: James Edward Charles Carr
- Date of birth: 19 December 1893
- Place of birth: Maryhill, Glasgow, Scotland
- Date of death: 26 June 1980 (aged 86)
- Place of death: Harrow, England
- Position: Outside left

Youth career
- 1908–1913: Watford Orient

Senior career*
Years	Team	Apps	(Gls)
1913–1914	Watford	18	(0)
1914–1915	West Ham United	9	(1)
1919–1923	Reading	116	(8)
1923–1926	Southampton	86	(10)
1926–1927	Swansea Town	7	(1)
1927	Southall		
1927–1928	Queens Park Rangers	0	(0)
- * Club domestic league appearances and goals

James Edward Charles Carr (19 December 1893 – 26 June 1980) was a Scottish footballer who played at outside left for Reading and Southampton in the 1920s. He was also a bowls player who competed for England at the Commonwealth Games.

== Football career ==
Carr was born in Maryhill, Glasgow, but started his football career as a youth playing for Watford Orient, before joining Watford as a 14-year-old in 1908. He made his Southern League debut for Watford at the age of 16. He moved to fellow Southern League club, West Ham United, in 1914 and made nine appearances in the 1914–15 season.

During World War I he was enlisted into the Army and played as a guest for Portsmouth and Kilmarnock in the wartime leagues. After the cessation of hostilities, Carr joined Reading in 1919, where he formed an "exciting partnership" on the left with Len Andrews. At the end of the 1919–20 season Reading, along with most of the Southern League clubs, formed the Third Division of the Football League. Carr remained with Reading for four years until moving to Southampton in June 1923.

At The Dell, Carr and Andrews briefly re-created their left-wing partnership, before Andrews was replaced by Cliff Price in December 1923. Having played in every match from the start of the 1923–24 season, a serious knee injury in January, which required an operation, put Carr out for the rest of the season, with Elias MacDonald replacing him.

Carr returned for the start of the next season, but his season was again disrupted by injuries, with either Fred Price, (Cliff Price's nephew) or Stan Cribb replacing him. Carr did, however, play a significant part in the Saints' run to the FA Cup Semi-finals, where they were defeated 2–0 by Sheffield United at Stamford Bridge.

In the 1925–26 season, Carr linked up well on the left, firstly with Cliff Price and later with Frank Matthews, before he was released at the end of the season.

Now in his mid-thirties, Carr placed an advertisement in the "Athletic News" stating that he wished to "assist a club outside the League in exchange for a business". This resulted initially in a transfer to Swansea Town where he played briefly before moving to Southall to become the proprietor of the Red Lion Hotel.

== Bowls career ==
He participated in the 1954 British Empire and Commonwealth Games at Vancouver, British Columbia, Canada in the fours/rinks event finishing 8th. At the time of the games he was self-employed and living at the Red Lion Hotel on the High Street in Southall, Middlesex.
