= Len Andrews =

English footballer (1888–1969)

Personal information
- Full name: Leonard Thomas Alford Andrews
- Date of birth: 9 December 1888
- Place of birth: Reading, Berkshire, England
- Date of death: 21 January 1969 (aged 80)
- Place of death: Southampton, England
- Height: 5 ft 9 in (1.75 m)
- Position: Inside forward

Youth career
- University of Reading

Senior career*
Years	Team	Apps	(Gls)
1909–1912	Reading		
1912–1915	Southampton	105	(32)
1919–1921	Reading	33	(5)
1921–1924	Southampton	59	(3)
1924–1925	Watford	38	(6)
- * Club domestic league appearances and goals

Leonard Thomas Alford Andrews (9 December 1888 – 21 January 1969) was an English professional footballer who played as an inside forward. During his career he had two spells with both Southampton and Reading, as well as playing for Watford.

== Playing career ==
Andrews was born in Reading and attended the University of Reading where he trained as a teacher. He joined Reading F.C. in October 1909 and was relegated from the Southern League First Division at the end his first season. However, they were promoted as champions of the Second Division in 1911.

In the summer of 1912 he moved to the south coast to join Southampton, who had just appointed a new trainer in Jimmy McIntyre. Due to the lack of funds following George Swift's spending spree in the previous season, McIntyre was only able to sign three new players; the only successful recruit was Andrews, whose signing from Reading was "one of the best moves of McIntyre's managerial career", as Andrews went on to become Southampton's most consistent forward in the three seasons leading up to the First World War, as well as an expert penalty taker.

He started off well, scoring eight goals in the first 17 games, before the goals dried up after Christmas 1912 and he finished the season with nine goals, one behind leading scorer Percy Prince. He was more consistent the following season, where he was now playing alongside Arthur Dominy; he scored twelve goals and missed only one league game. In the final pre-war season he contributed eleven goals of which eight were from penalties.

Described by Holley & Chalk in "The Alphabet of the Saints" as a "clever and able forward who could play in all the front positions", he was a noted penalty taker, converting all but two of the 22 penalty kicks he took, gaining a reputation as "a man who could hit the ball harder, and more accurately, with his left foot than any other player in the game".

During the First World War, Andrews joined the 5th Battalion Wiltshire Regiment, where he served in the Middle East rising to the rank of Regimental Sergeant Major.

After the war, he signed for his first club Reading in July 1919. During the 1919–20 season he was part of the last Southern League representative XI, playing in a fixture against Corinthians. At the end of the 1919–20 season Reading, along with most of the Southern League clubs, formed the Third Division of the Football League. Andrews spent the first season of the new division with Reading before returning to Southampton in August 1921. During his second spell at Reading, Andrews formed an "exciting partnership" with Jimmy Carr on the left-wing, which was to be briefly re-created at Southampton a few years later.

In his first season back at The Dell he helped the Saints to the Third Division South title. By now the goals were few and far between and, although his enthusiasm carried him through another two seasons, he was no longer a first choice player, losing out firstly to Joe Clark for much of the 1922–23 season and then to Henry Johnson the following season. On 17 February 1923 he was drafted in as goalkeeper for a match at Port Vale when Tommy Allen was taken ill; he acquitted himself well as the game finished goalless.

He played his final match for Southampton at Blackpool on 24 November 1923. During his two spells with Southampton, he played 180 games in all competitions, scoring 40 goals of which exactly half were from penalties.

In August 1924 he joined Watford on a free transfer. He made 38 league appearances for the club, as well as a further two in the FA Cup, playing as either an inside forward or left winger. He finished the 1924–25 season joint top scorer alongside Fred Pagnam with six league and one FA Cup goals. However, he was released by Watford at the end of the season.

After retiring from the game in 1925, he returned to Southampton where he took up a career as an insurance salesman. He became an outstanding bowls player and won honours at county level. He died in January 1969, shortly after his 80th birthday.

== Honours ==
Reading

- Southern League Second Division championship: 1910–11

Southampton

- Football League Third Division South championship: 1921–22
