= Croydon Common Athletic Ground =

Football stadium in Selhurst, England

Coordinates: 51°23′27.74″N 0°5′9.10″W

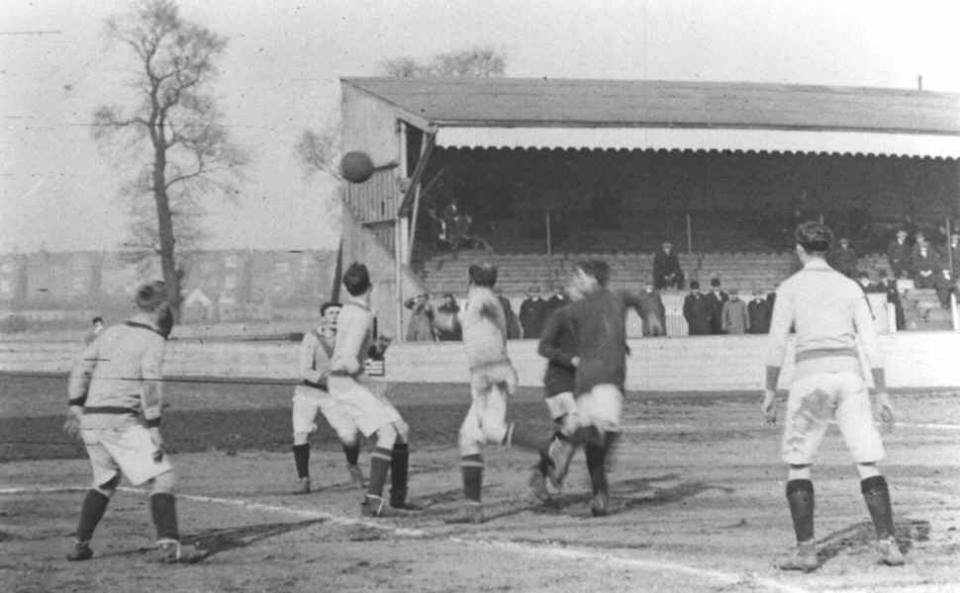
A Croydon Common home match against Luton Town at Croydon Common Athletic Ground, sometime between 1909 and 1911

Croydon Common Athletic Ground, commonly referred to as the Nest, was a football stadium in Selhurst, south London. The original occupiers of the ground were Croydon Common, the Robins, who occupied it from 1908 to 1917.

It was also the home ground of Crystal Palace from 1918 until 1924. The Nest was subleased from the London, Brighton and South Coast Railway, the parties being The Croydon Common Football and Athletic Company Limited and then Crystal Palace Football and Athletic Club, The London Brighton and South Coast Railway Company and the Ecclesiastical Commissioners for England. The reason for three parties to this lease was that the Ecclesiastical Commissioners actually owned the land, the Railway Company had leased it from them and thus the club was subleasing it from the Railway Company. The lease stipulated that the ground could only be used for soccer or athletics or for "the holding of Flower Shows and School treats". As the ground was owned by the Church, the lease also prohibited its use for any purposes on Good Friday and Christmas Day and so the club played only away fixtures on these particular days. The 1872 1:10,560 Ordnance Survey Map merely shows the land as being "Selhurst Wood" prior to the ground being formed.

The ground was quite basic, having only small earth banks around the major part of its circumference. These banks were topped by bushes known to the supporters as "The Jungle". When Croydon Common took over The Nest there was a small stand with seats on the northern side of the ground, but this burned down shortly afterwards. A new stand, significantly longer than the previous one (approximately 75 metres long), was erected to replace it. This stand consisted of an elevated tier with seven rows of seating, achieving an approximate capacity of 1500 seats, and a small standing paddock at the front. The roof had a small triangular white painted gable in its centre. In addition to the dressing rooms, there were a number of stores, rooms and offices under this grandstand. A cinder athletics track ran around the pitch.

The name of "The Nest" came about because the first club to occupy it were Croydon Common – they wore red shirts and were nicknamed "The Robins", hence their ground being known as "The Nest". It typically held a maximum of 20,000 supporters. The Robins were wound up in 1917.

== Crystal Palace ==
The club moved to The Nest in 1918, having spent four years at the Herne Hill Athletics Stadium and gained promotion in the 1920–21 season by winning the Division Three championship (later to become known as Division 3 (South)). There is no connection between the Crystal Palace nickname 'The Eagles' and the name of this former ground – the nickname only coming about in the 1970s via the flamboyant manager Malcolm Allison.

In 1924, the club bought a new state-of-the-art ground, Selhurst Park, which would be their home into the next century. Crystal Palace then sublet the ground to Tramways F.C., a railway workers football club.

During the time that Crystal Palace played league football at The Nest, it was common for many spectators to purchase a platform ticket at the adjoining Selhurst Station, and watch matches from Platform 1, as this was cheaper than the match admission price and afforded an elevated clear view of all of the ground.

The site of The Nest is now a train depot for the rail company Southern. The only confirmed remaining trace of the ground is the front boundary wall along Selhurst Road, opposite the railway station. There is some conjecture amongst historians regarding whether or not the shell of the grandstand remains (minus its original roof), as a brick building operating as stores for the railway depot exists in the same position (in which the number of rooms within this building matches exactly the number of rooms under the grandstand as described on the football club leases). This building also displays an interesting feature on its side walls, namely possible steps from what would have been the seating tier. This structure curiously also possesses a quite substantial chimney, which would have to have been subsequently added.
