= Harry Hooper (footballer, born 1900) =

English footballer

Personal information
- Full name: Harold Hooper
- Date of birth: 18 August 1900
- Place of birth: Brierley Hill, England
- Date of death: 1963 (aged 62–63)
- Height: 5 ft 9 in (1.75 m)
- Position: Full-back

Youth career
- Brierley Hill Alliance

Senior career*
Years	Team	Apps	(Gls)
1921–1924	Southampton	19	(0)
1924–1926	Leicester City	33	(0)
1926–1927	Queens Park Rangers	16	(0)
- * Club domestic league appearances and goals

Harold Hooper (18 August 1900 – 1963) was an English footballer who played at full-back for various clubs in the 1920s. He was known to supporters as "Rufus" because of the colour of his hair.

== Football career ==
Hooper was born in Brierley Hill, Staffordshire and played for Brierley Hill Alliance before moving to the south coast to join Southampton in May 1921.

At The Dell, Hooper provided cover for the well-established full-backs, Tom Parker and Fred Titmuss and found it hard to break into the first-team. He made his debut at Watford on 22 October 1921, replacing Parker at right-back, followed by three further league appearances later in the season. Hooper's longest runs in the side came with five matches in September 1922, playing at left-back in place of Titmuss and four matches in December at right-back.

After three frustrating seasons in which he only made twenty appearances, Hooper moved back to the Midlands to join Leicester City in May 1926 as part of the deal that brought winger Fred Price and half-back Dennis Jones to the south coast. At Filbert Street, Hooper was considered to be "dour and resolute", making 33 League appearances before joining Queens Park Rangers in May 1926.

== Family ==
Hooper was a cousin to Charlie Roberts, who played for Manchester United and England.
