= 1920–21 Southampton F.C. season =

English football club season

Southampton F.C.
1920–21 season
- Chairman: Tankerville Chamberlayne
- Manager: Jimmy McIntyre
- Stadium: The Dell
- Third Division: Runners-up
- FA Cup: Third round
- Top goalscorer: League: Bill Rawlings (18); All: Bill Rawlings (22)
- Highest home attendance: League: 20,000 v Crystal Palace (28 March 1921); Overall: 21,363 v Cardiff City (19 February 1921)
- Lowest home attendance: 7,000 (multiple games)
- Average home league attendance: 12,599
- Biggest win: 5–0 v Merthyr Town (19 March 1921)
- Biggest defeat: 0–3 v Grimsby Town (11 December 1920)
Home colours

The 1920–21 season was the 26th season of competitive football by Southampton, and the club's first in the Football League. At the end of the previous season, Southampton were one of a host of Southern League clubs elected to make up the new Third Division, finishing second in the inaugural season behind champions Crystal Palace. The Saints began the season strongly, winning seven of their first ten games to begin a lengthy run at the top of the league table until the end of the year. The club began to lose against several teams lower in the table in December, dropping a position as Palace continued to win the majority of their games. Southampton finished the season in second place with 19 wins, 16 draws and seven losses, four points behind the champions and one point ahead of third-placed Queens Park Rangers.

In the 1920–21 FA Cup, Southampton beat fellow Third Division sides Northampton Town (after a replay) and Grimsby Town to reach the third round, before being knocked out by eventual semi-finalists Cardiff City. The club ended the season at Fratton Park with the annual Hampshire Benevolent Cup charity match against local rivals Portsmouth, which the hosts won 1–0 through a goal from Harold Buddery. The game was notable for featuring right-back Tom Parker in goal, who was forced to fill in for the injured Tommy Allen. Southampton also played three friendly matches during the campaign, beating newly formed Welsh club Bridgend Town 3–1 in October, losing 1–0 to former Southern League rivals Aberdare Athletic in March, and drawing 1–1 with Third Division opponents Reading in the Berkshire Charity Cup in May.

Southampton used 21 different players during the 1920–21 season and had ten different goalscorers. Their top scorer was centre-forward Bill Rawlings, who scored 18 goals in the Third Division and four in the FA Cup. Inside-forwards Arthur Dominy and James Moore each scored 12 goals in the league, with the former also netting three in the FA Cup. Seven new players were signed by the club during the campaign, with four released and sold to other clubs. The average attendance at The Dell during the 1920–21 season was 12,599. The highest attendance was 21,363 for the FA Cup third-round match against Cardiff City; the lowest was around 7,000 for matches against Reading on 1 January, Northampton Town on 9 March and Newport County on 2 May 1921 (the latter of which was the final home fixture of the season).

== Background and transfers ==
At the end of the 1919–20 season, manager Jimmy McIntyre made several changes to the Southampton squad in preparation for their first season in the Football League. Scottish goalkeeper George Wilcock, who had joined the club just a year earlier, was sold to struggling First Division side Preston North End in May 1920, where he made seven appearances in the top flight before dropping out of league football at the end of the season. He was replaced by former Sunderland goalkeeper Tommy Allen, who was brought to The Dell for free after his former club "had forgotten to include [him] on their end-of-season retained list". Centre-forward George Jones, another recent signing who had scored five goals in seven appearances in the club's last Southern League campaign, joined Yorkshire non-league side Goole Town. Arthur Andrews, who had established his place at right-half the previous year, was forced to retire from professional football following a broken leg in January, with Southampton releasing him at the end of the season.

Later in the summer, former Saints left-half Len Butt returned to the club from Thornycrofts, while Northern Irish centre-half George Moorhead joined from Sunnyside as cover for Alec Campbell. In September, centre-forward George Reader joined from Exeter City for a fee of £50. However, due to the form of Bill Rawlings, Reader's opportunities in the side were limited – after only three league appearances, he left at the end of the season to focus on a teaching career, playing part-time for Harland and Wolff. The following month, the club signed outside-right Frank Wright from Hamstead Colliery, who made just one appearance (described by club historians as "a poor showing") before being released at the end of the season. In November, forward-turned-half-back Percy Prince was also released by Southampton, returning to his former club Boscombe. Towards the end of the campaign, Southampton signed centre-forward John Cooper and inside-right Henry Johnson from Birmingham & District League side Darlaston.

Players transferred in

Name	Nationality	Pos.	Club	Date	Fee	Ref.
Tommy Allen	England	GK	(England) Sunderland	May 1920	Free	
Len Butt	England	HB	(England) Thornycrofts	August 1920	Free	
George Moorhead	Northern Ireland	HB	(Northern Ireland) Sunnyside	August 1920	Free	
George Reader	England	FW	(England) Exeter City	September 1920	£50	
Frank Wright	England	FW	(England) Hamstead Colliery	October 1920	Free	
John Cooper	England	FW	(England) Darlaston	April 1921	Unknown	
Henry Johnson	England	FW	(England) Darlaston	April 1921	Unknown	

Players transferred out

Name	Nationality	Pos.	Club	Date	Fee	Ref.
George Jones	England	FW	(England) Goole Town	May 1920	Unknown	
George Wilcock	Scotland	GK	(England) Preston North End	May 1920	Unknown	
Percy Prince	England	HB	(England) Boscombe	November 1920	Unknown	

Players released

Name	Nationality	Pos.	Date	Subsequent club	Ref.
Arthur Andrews	England	HB	May 1920	(England) Harland and Wolff	

== Third Division ==
Southampton's first Football League campaign began on 28 August 1920 with an away fixture against Gillingham, who had finished bottom of the Southern League Premier Division the previous year. The match ended in a 1–1 draw, with Arthur Dominy scoring the club's first goal of the season (and in the division) with a shot "from an oblique angle". Dominy scored another two goals two days later in a 4–0 home win over Swindon Town, with the other two goals coming from Joe Barratt and Bill Rawlings. In their first ten games of the campaign, Southampton dropped only three points from a possible 20 (one in the opening day draw, and two in a 3–2 return loss at Swindon Town), securing the top spot in the Third Division table in early October following consecutive pairs of victories over Portsmouth (last season's Southern League Premier Division champions) and Norwich City. Rawlings took over from Dominy as the season's top scorer on 18 September, when he scored the only goal in the away fixture against Portsmouth, his fourth of the season.

The club continued their unbeaten run until their 17th game of the season on 4 December, when they were beaten at home for the first time in almost a year at the hands of Grimsby Town, who picked up an unlikely 1–0 win after the Saints saw Tom Parker miss a penalty and James Moore sent off. The Mariners also won the return fixture at Blundell Park a week later 3–0, as the only side to win both matches against Southampton during the season. Despite holding on to the top spot in the league into the new year, a winless run of four games saw the club drop below Crystal Palace, who had continued to pick up wins over the Christmas period. Losses at Northampton Town and Southend United helped Palace to extend their lead at the top of the table, with Southampton dropping down to third for a few weeks in February.

On 19 March 1921, Southampton picked up their biggest win of the season when they beat Merthyr Town 5–0 at home, with Bill Rawlings becoming only the club's third player to score four goals in a league match (after John Fraser and Fred Harrison, the latter of whom scored five in two games, both in the 1902–03 season). Two 1–1 draws in two days against the league leaders at the end of the month left Southampton with too much ground to make up in the final period of the season. In the first game, at The Dell, the visitors equalised in "the very last seconds" which "caused such excitement that several barriers at the Milton Road end [of the ground] collapsed, injuring several spectators". In their last nine games of the season the Saints picked up just ten points, from two wins and six draws, which left them trailing five points behind Crystal Palace, who secured the only Second Division promotion place in the division. They finished just one point ahead of third-placed Queens Park Rangers and two ahead of Swindon Town in fourth place.

=== List of match results ===
28 August 1920 1	Gillingham	1–1	Southampton	Gillingham
			Dominy	Stadium: Priestfield Stadium; Attendance: 11,500

30 August 1920 2	Southampton	4–0	Swindon Town	Southampton
	Dominy; Barratt; Rawlings			Stadium: The Dell; Attendance: 11,500

4 September 1920 3	Southampton	3–0	Gillingham	Southampton
	Brown; Rawlings; Foxall			Stadium: The Dell; Attendance: 14,000

6 September 1920 4	Swindon Town	3–2	Southampton	Swindon
			Williams; Rawlings	Stadium: County Ground; Attendance: 9,000

11 September 1920 5	Southampton	2–0	Portsmouth	Southampton
	Parker; Moore			Stadium: The Dell; Attendance: 18,300

18 September 1920 6	Portsmouth	0–1	Southampton	Portsmouth
			Rawlings	Stadium: Fratton Park; Attendance: 20,585

25 September 1920 7	Norwich City	0–1	Southampton	Norwich
			Rawlings	Stadium: The Nest; Attendance: 9,000

2 October 1920 8	Southampton	1–0	Norwich City	Southampton
	Dominy			Stadium: The Dell; Attendance: 15,000

9 October 1920 9	Southampton	3–0	Swansea Town	Southampton
	Parker; Shelley; Moore			Stadium: The Dell; Attendance: 15,000

16 October 1920 10	Swansea Town	1–1	Southampton	Swansea
			Barratt	Stadium: Vetch Field; Attendance: 12,000

23 October 1920 11	Southampton	3–0	Brentford	Southampton
	Shelley; Rawlings; Foxall			Stadium: The Dell; Attendance: 13,000

30 October 1920 12	Brentford	1–1	Southampton	Brentford
			Moore	Stadium: Griffin Park; Attendance: 12,000

6 November 1920 13	Southampton	2–2	Queens Park Rangers	Southampton
	Campbell; Moore			Stadium: The Dell; Attendance: 15,000

13 November 1920 14	Queens Park Rangers	0–0	Southampton	London
				Stadium: Loftus Road; Attendance: 15,000

20 November 1920 15	Southampton	4–0	Bristol Rovers	Southampton
	Barratt; Brown; Rawlings; Foxall			Stadium: The Dell; Attendance: 17,000

27 November 1920 16	Bristol Rovers	1–2	Southampton	Bristol
			Rawlings; Moore	Stadium: Eastville Stadium; Attendance: 17,000

4 December 1920 17	Southampton	0–1	Grimsby Town	Southampton
				Stadium: The Dell; Attendance: 11,000

11 December 1920 18	Grimsby Town	3–0	Southampton	Cleethorpes
				Stadium: Blundell Park; Attendance: 9,000

18 December 1920 19	Reading	0–4	Southampton	Reading
			Dominy; Rawlings; Moore	Stadium: Elm Park; Attendance: 9,000

25 December 1920 20	Luton Town	1–1	Southampton	Luton
			Moore	Stadium: Kenilworth Road; Attendance: 14,000

27 December 1920 21	Southampton	1–1	Luton Town	Southampton
	Moore			Stadium: The Dell; Attendance: 19,793

1 January 1921 22	Southampton	1–2	Reading	Southampton
	Moore			Stadium: The Dell; Attendance: 7,000

15 January 1921 23	Watford	0–0	Southampton	Watford
				Stadium: Cassio Road; Attendance: 9,000

22 January 1921 24	Southampton	4–1	Watford	Southampton
	Dominy; Rawlings			Stadium: The Dell; Attendance: 14,000

5 February 1921 25	Brighton and Hove Albion	1–1	Southampton	Hove
			Rawlings	Stadium: Goldstone Ground; Attendance: 8,000

12 February 1921 26	Northampton Town	2–0	Southampton	Northampton
				Stadium: County Ground; Attendance: 6,000

23 February 1921 27	Southampton	1–0	Brighton and Hove Albion	Southampton
	Rawlings			Stadium: The Dell; Attendance: 8,000

26 February 1921 28	Southend United	1–0	Southampton	Southend-on-Sea
				Stadium: Kursaal; Attendance: 7,000

5 March 1921 29	Southampton	3–0	Southend United	Southampton
	Moore; Rawlings			Stadium: The Dell; Attendance: 10,000

9 March 1921 30	Southampton	3–1	Northampton Town	Southampton
	Foxall; Campbell			Stadium: The Dell; Attendance: 7,000

12 March 1921 31	Merthyr Town	1–1	Southampton	Merthyr Tydfil
			Dominy	Stadium: Penydarren Park; Attendance: 12,000

19 March 1921 32	Southampton	5–0	Merthyr Town	Southampton
	Rawlings; Brown			Stadium: The Dell; Attendance: 8,000

26 March 1921 33	Southampton	1–0	Plymouth Argyle	Southampton
	Campbell			Stadium: The Dell; Attendance: 14,000

28 March 1921 34	Southampton	1–1	Crystal Palace	Southampton
	Moore			Stadium: The Dell; Attendance: 20,000

29 March 1921 35	Crystal Palace	1–1	Southampton	London
			Own goal	Stadium: The Nest; Attendance: 15,000

2 April 1921 36	Plymouth Argyle	0–0	Southampton	Plymouth
				Stadium: Home Park; Attendance: 10,000

9 April 1921 37	Southampton	3–0	Exeter City	Southampton
	Shelley; Dominy; Rawlings			Stadium: The Dell; Attendance: 10,000

16 April 1921 38	Exeter City	1–0	Southampton	Exeter
				Stadium: St James Park; Attendance: 7,000

23 April 1921 39	Southampton	1–1	Millwall	Southampton
	Brown			Stadium: The Dell; Attendance: 10,000

30 April 1921 40	Millwall	0–1	Southampton	London
			Dominy	Stadium: The Den; Attendance: 18,000

2 May 1921 41	Southampton	0–0	Newport County	Southampton
				Stadium: The Dell; Attendance: 7,000

7 May 1921 42	Newport County	0–0	Southampton	Newport
				Stadium: Somerton Park; Attendance: 8,000

=== Final league table ===
Pos	Team	Pld	W	D	L	GF	GA	GR	Pts	Promotion
1	Crystal Palace (C, P)	42	24	11	7	70	34	2.059	59	Promotion to the Second Division
2	Southampton	42	19	16	7	64	28	2.286	54	
3	Queens Park Rangers	42	22	9	11	61	32	1.906	53	
4	Swindon Town	42	21	10	11	73	49	1.490	52	
5	Swansea Town	42	18	15	9	56	45	1.244	51	

Source: fchd.info
(C) Champions; (P) Promoted

=== Results by matchday ===
Round	1	2	3	4	5	6	7	8	9	10	11	12	13	14	15	16	17	18	19	20	21	22	23	24	25	26	27	28	29	30	31	32	33	34	35	36	37	38	39	40	41	42
Ground	A	H	H	A	H	A	A	H	H	A	H	A	H	A	H	A	H	A	A	A	H	H	A	H	A	A	H	A	H	H	A	H	H	H	A	A	H	A	H	A	H	A
Result	D	W	W	L	W	W	W	W	W	D	W	D	D	D	W	W	L	L	W	D	D	L	D	W	D	L	W	L	W	W	D	W	W	D	D	D	W	L	D	W	D	D
Position	10	2	1	1	2	2	2	1	1	1	1	1	1	1	1	1	1	1	1	1	1	1	2	2	1	3	3	3	3	2	2	2	2	2	2	2	2	2	2	2	2	2

Source: Statto
A = Away; H = Home; W = Win; D = Draw; L = Loss

== FA Cup ==
Southampton entered the 1920–21 FA Cup in the first round against fellow Third Division side Northampton Town. The Cobblers held the Saints to a goalless draw in a "gruelling first-round match" at the County Ground on 7 January 1921, although by the end of the game Southampton were "well on top". This form carried over into the replay four days later at The Dell, which the hosts won comfortably 4–1 thanks to two goals each from on-form forwards Arthur Dominy and Bill Rawlings. Receipts for the fixtures were £1,017 and £1,118, respectively, which set a new record for each ground. Grimsby Town, another Third Division club, were Southampton's opponents in the second round on 28 January, having beaten Norwich City in the previous round. Despite losing both fixtures against the side the previous month, Jimmy McIntyre's side picked up a 3–1 away win over the Mariners thanks to two goals from Rawlings and another from Dominy, who described his team as "faster [and] more together as a side" following the result.

In the third round of the tournament, Southampton faced their first higher-league opponents of the season in Cardiff City, who were then placed third in the Second Division. The fixture was described by club historians as "a game of missed chances", which the Welsh side won with the only goal of the game after approximately 20 minutes following a "rare defensive mistake" by the Saints. The match against Cardiff City marked the highest attendance at The Dell during the season, exceeding 21,000 for the only time that year, as well as the second time the ground's receipts record had been broken as the club brought in £1,708 from attendees. The club played the same lineup in all four matches in the tournament. Cardiff City ultimately made it to the semi-finals of the tournament for the first time in their history later that year, beating First Division side Chelsea 1–0 in the fourth round after eliminating Southampton, before being knocked out by fellow second-tier club Wolverhampton Wanderers 3–1 in a replay on 23 March.

7 January 1921 Round 1	Northampton Town	0–0	Southampton	Northampton
				Stadium: County Ground; Attendance: 15,542

11 January 1921 Round 1 replay	Southampton	4–1	Northampton Town	Southampton
	Dominy; Rawlings			Stadium: The Dell; Attendance: 16,000

28 January 1921 Round 2	Grimsby Town	1–3	Southampton	Cleethorpes
			Dominy; Rawlings	Stadium: Blundell Park; Attendance: 14,000

19 February 1921 Round 3	Southampton	0–1	Cardiff City	Southampton
				Stadium: The Dell; Attendance: 21,363

== Other matches ==
Outside of the league and the FA Cup, Southampton played four additional first-team matches. The first was a friendly match against newly formed Welsh side Bridgend Town on 18 October 1920, which the Saints won 3–1 thanks to goals from Arthur Dominy, Fred Foxall and James Moore. The next took place the following March and saw the club facing another Welsh side, Aberdare Athletic, which they lost by a single goal. On 11 May 1921, they travelled to face local rivals Portsmouth at Fratton Park for the annual Hampshire Benevolent Cup charity match. The game – which drew a record crowd for the competition of 6,740 – saw the visitors forced to play right-back Tom Parker in goal in place of Tommy Allen, who had been injured, in the absence of a suitable replacement. Portsmouth won the game 1–0 thanks to a headed goal from Harold Buddery around 15 minutes into the second half, marking their eighth win of the competition (to date, the Saints had only won three times, with one match ending in a draw). On 14 May, a week after the last game of the league campaign, Southampton ended their season at fellow Third Division side Reading in the Berkshire Charity Cup, drawing 1–1 with a goal from Dominy.

18 October 1920 Friendly	Bridgend Town	1–3	Southampton	Bridgend
			Dominy; Foxall; Moore

14 March 1921 Friendly	Aberdare Athletic	1–0	Southampton	Aberdare
				Stadium: Athletic Ground

11 May 1921 Hampshire BC	Portsmouth	1–0	Southampton	Portsmouth
	Buddery 60'			Stadium: Fratton Park; Attendance: 6,740; Referee: E. A. Head

14 May 1921 Berkshire CC	Reading	1–1	Southampton	Reading
			Dominy	Stadium: Elm Park

== Player details ==
Southampton manager Jimmy McIntyre used 21 different players during the 1920–21 season, ten of whom scored during the campaign. The team played in a 2–3–5 formation throughout the campaign, with two full-backs, three half-backs, two outside forwards, two inside forwards and a centre-forward. Three players appeared in all 46 league and FA Cup matches: outside-left Fred Foxall, inside-left James Moore and left-half Bill Turner. Left-back Fred Titmuss played all but one league match during the season, and goalkeeper Tommy Allen appeared in all except two. Bill Rawlings finished as the club's top scorer for the season, with 18 goals in the league and four in the cup. Arthur Dominy scored 15 times across both competitions, while James Moore matched his league tally of 12 goals. Centre-half Alec Campbell and right-half Bert Shelley were the club's highest-scoring half-backs of the season with three league goals a piece, and right-back Tom Parker was the highest-scoring defender with two goals.

=== Squad statistics ===
Name	Pos.	Nat.	League		FA Cup		Hampshire BC		Total	
Name	Pos.	Nat.	Apps.	Gls.	Apps.	Gls.	Apps.	Gls.	Apps.	Gls.
Tommy Allen	GK	(England)	40	0	4	0	0	0	44	0
Joe Barratt	FW	(England)	30	3	4	0	1	0	35	3
Ken Boyes	FW	(England)	0	0	0	0	1	0	1	0
George Bradburn	HB	(England)	5	0	0	0	0	0	5	0
Charlie Brown	FW	(England)	16	4	0	0	0	0	16	4
Len Butt	HB	(England)	13	0	0	0	1	0	14	0
Alec Campbell	HB	(England)	31	3	0	0	1	0	32	3
Arthur Dominy	FW	(England)	35	12	4	3	1	0	40	15
Fred Foxall	FW	(England)	42	5	4	0	0	0	46	5
Henry Johnson	FW	(England)	0	0	0	0	1	0	1	0
James Moore	FW	(England)	42	12	4	0	0	0	46	12
George Moorhead	HB	(Northern Ireland)	9	0	4	0	0	0	13	0
Tom Parker	FB	(England)	30	2	4	0	1	0	35	2
Bill Rawlings	FW	(England)	39	18	4	4	1	0	44	22
George Reader	FW	(England)	3	0	0	0	0	0	3	0
Bert Shelley	HB	(England)	39	3	4	0	1	0	44	3
Fred Titmuss	FB	(England)	41	0	4	0	1	0	46	0
Bill Turner	HB	(England)	42	0	4	0	1	0	47	0
George Williams	FW	(England)	2	1	0	0	0	0	2	1
Arthur Wood	GK	(England)	2	0	0	0	0	0	2	0
Frank Wright	FW	(England)	1	0	0	0	0	0	1	0

=== Most appearances ===
Rank	Name	Pos.	League		FA Cup		Hampshire BC		Total	
Rank	Name	Pos.	Apps.	%	Apps.	%	Apps.	%	Apps.	%
1	Bill Turner	HB	42	100.00	4	100.00	1	100.00	47	100.00
2	Fred Foxall	FW	42	100.00	4	100.00	0	0.00	46	97.87
2	James Moore	FW	42	100.00	4	100.00	0	0.00	46	97.87
2	Fred Titmuss	FB	41	97.62	4	100.00	1	100.00	46	97.87
5	Tommy Allen	GK	40	95.24	4	100.00	0	0.00	44	93.62
5	Bill Rawlings	FW	39	92.86	4	100.00	1	100.00	44	93.62
5	Bert Shelley	HB	39	92.86	4	100.00	1	100.00	44	93.62
8	Arthur Dominy	FW	35	83.33	4	100.00	1	100.00	40	85.11
9	Joe Barratt	FW	30	71.43	4	100.00	1	100.00	35	74.47
9	Tom Parker	FB	30	71.43	4	100.00	1	100.00	35	74.47

=== Top goalscorers ===
Rank	Name	Pos.	League		FA Cup		Hampshire BC		Total	
Rank	Name	Pos.	Gls.	GPG	Gls.	GPG	Gls.	GPG	Gls.	GPG
1	Bill Rawlings	FW	18	0.46	4	1.00	0	0.00	22	0.50
2	Arthur Dominy	FW	12	0.34	3	0.75	0	0.00	15	0.37
3	James Moore	FW	12	0.28	0	0.00	0	0.00	12	0.26
4	Fred Foxall	FW	5	0.11	0	0.00	0	0.00	5	0.10
5	Charlie Brown	FW	4	0.25	0	0.00	0	0.00	4	0.25
6	Alec Campbell	HB	3	0.09	0	0.00	0	0.00	3	0.09
6	Joe Barratt	FW	3	0.10	0	0.00	0	0.00	3	0.08
6	Bert Shelley	HB	3	0.07	0	0.00	0	0.00	3	0.06
9	Tom Parker	FB	2	0.06	0	0.00	0	0.00	2	0.05
10	George Williams	FW	1	0.50	0	0.00	0	0.00	1	0.50

== Bibliography ==
- Chalk, Gary; Holley, Duncan (10 August 1987), A Complete Record of Southampton Football Club: 1885–1987, Derby, England: Breedon Books, ISBN 978-0907969228
- Chalk, Gary; Holley, Duncan; Bull, David (28 November 2013), All the Saints: A Complete Who's Who of Southampton FC, Bristol, England: Hagiology Publishing, ISBN 978-0992686406
- Juson, Dave; Aldworth, Clay; Bendel, Barry; Bull, David; Chalk, Gary (10 November 2004), Saints v Pompey: A History of Unrelenting Rivalry, Bristol, England: Hagiology Publishing, ISBN 978-0953447459
