= List of Southampton F.C. seasons =

Southampton Football Club, an English association football club based in Southampton, Hampshire, was founded in 1885 as St. Mary's Y.M.A. For almost six years the club took no part in any official competitions at national level, playing only friendlies and local tournaments, including the Hampshire Senior Cup. St Mary's first entered the FA Cup in the 1891–92 season, and in 1894 under the name Southampton St Mary's joined the newly founded Southern Football League.

Southampton league performance from 1920 to 2026

The club changed its name to simply Southampton at the start of the 1896–97 season, and quickly established themselves as the primary force in football in the South of England, winning the Southern League three times in a row. The club also reached the semi-finals of the FA Cup in 1898, losing the replay 2–0 to Nottingham Forest after a 1–1 draw. The Saints continued to dominate the league into the 20th century, claiming the championship again in 1901, 1903 and 1904, before joining the Football League Third Division as a founding member in 1920, following the absorption of the Southern League. Southampton were almost instantly promoted to the Second Division, completing the feat as champions in the 1921–22 season.

Southampton found life in the second flight of English football difficult, as they remained a mid-bottom table side throughout the seasons played before and immediately after the Second World War, before they were ultimately relegated back to the Third Division in 1953. Promoted as champions again in 1960, Southampton performed well in the following ten years, reaching the quarter-final stage in the newly created League Cup in 1961 and earning promotion to Division One in 1966 as division runners-up. The club received its first taste of continental football in the 1969–70 season when they competed in the Inter-Cities Fairs Cup, although were knocked out in the first round. Despite suffering relegation back to Division Two in 1974, Southampton achieved a surprise victory in the 1976 FA Cup final against Manchester United to win the trophy for the first and only time in the club's history. This success was topped off two seasons later when the club regained its First Division place.

The 1983–84 season was Southampton's most successful in terms of league position, when the club finished second in the top flight to Liverpool, missing out on the championship by just three points. In the 1990s, the club largely struggled to get out of the bottom third of the table, although they reached the advanced stages of the FA Cup and League Cup on a number of occasions and also played in the Full Members Cup final in 1992. The club became founder members of the Premier League in 1992 but continued their disappointing performances, despite reaching the 2003 FA Cup final against Arsenal and losing to a single goal. Southampton were relegated to the Championship in the 2004–05 season, and were relegated again following off-the-pitch problems in 2009. However, Southampton were galvanised when Marcus Liebherr rescued them from administration on 8 July 2009, winning the Johnstone's Paint Trophy with an emphatic 4–1 win against Carlisle United. The following season, Southampton were promoted to the Championship as runners-up in League One and finished runners-up again the next season in the Championship to return to the Premier League. The club subsequently enjoyed four consecutive top eight finishes in the top flight, qualifying for the Europa League twice, as well as reaching the 2017 EFL Cup final where they were beaten 3–2 by Manchester United. Southampton would then be relegated in 2023, before gaining promotion straight back to the Premier League via the playoffs the following season.

As of the end of the 2025–26 season, the club have spent 47 seasons in the top division of English football, 41 in the second, and 11 in the third.

The table details their achievements in all national and international first team competitions, and records their manager, the top goalscorer, the player with the most league appearances and the average home league attendance, for each completed season since their first appearance in the FA Cup in 1891–92.

== Competitions ==
The club has participated in the following leagues:

- The Southern League (from 1894–95 to 1919–20)
- The Football League (from 1920–21 to 1991–92, from 2005–06 to 2011–12, 2023–24 and since 2025–26)
- The Premier League (from 1992–93 to 2004–05, from 2012–13 to 2022–23 and 2024–25)

The club has participated in the following other first-team tournaments:

- FA Cup (since 1891–92)
- Southern Professional Floodlit Cup (from 1957–58 to 1959–60)
- EFL Cup (since 1960–61)
- Inter-Cities Fairs Cup (in 1969–70)
- UEFA Cup / Europa League (in 1971–72, 1981–82, 1982–83, 1984–85, 2003–04, 2015–16, 2016–17)
- Texaco Cup (in 1974–75)
- Community Shield (in 1976)
- Anglo-Italian League Cup (in 1976)
- European Cup Winners' Cup (in 1976–77)
- Super Cup (in 1985–86)
- Full Members Cup (from 1986–87 to 1991–92)
- Football League Trophy (from 2009–10 to 2010–11)

== Key ==
1st or W	Winners
2nd or RU	Runners-up
↑	Promoted
↓	Relegated

- Pld – Matches played
- W – Matches won
- D – Matches drawn
- L – Matches lost
- GF – Goals for
- GA – Goals against
- Pts – Points
- Pos – Final position

- 2Q – Second qualifying round
- 3Q – Third qualifying round
- PO – Play-off round
- GS – Group stage
- R1 – First round
- R2 – Second round, etc.
- QF – Quarter-finals
- SF – Semi-finals

- Div 1 – Football League First Division
- Div 2 – Football League Second Division
- Div 3 – Football League Third Division
- Div 3(S) – Football League Third Division South
- Prem – Premier League
- Champ – EFL Championship
- Lge 1 – EFL League One
- SL Div 1 – Southern League Division One

- Top scorer shown **in bold** when player was also top scorer for the division. Appearance number shown **in bold** when player played in every league match of the season.
- League results shown in italics for abandoned competition.

== Seasons ==
Season	League record									FA Cup	EFL Cup (Note: The EFL Cup competition started in the 1960–61 season.)	Europe / Other		Manager(s)	Top goalscorer(s) (Note: Includes goals scored in the Southern League, The Football League and the Premier League and the other first-team tournaments as listed above.)		Most league appearances (Note: Includes substitute appearances. Bold indicates "ever-present".)		Average attendance (Note: League matches only (including Southern League, Football League and Premier League).)
Season	Division	Pld	W	D	L	GF	GA	Pts	Pos	FA Cup	EFL Cup	Europe / Other		Manager(s)	Player(s)	Goals	Player(s)	Apps.	Average attendance
1891–92	N/A									2Q (Note: Reached Second qualifying round, where they defeated Reading 7–0 but were disqualified for fielding ineligible players.)					Jock Fleming Ernie Nicholls	3	N/A		
1892–93	N/A									2Q				Cecil Knight	Bob Kiddle	3	N/A		
1893–94	N/A									2Q				Cecil Knight	Ernie Nicholls Ernie Taylor Herbert Ward	1	N/A		
1894–95	SL Div 1 (Note: Founder member of the Southern League.)	16	9	2	5	34	25	20	3rd	R1				Cecil Knight	Charles Baker	12	Alf Littlehales	16	
1895–96	SL Div 1	18	12	0	6	44	23	24	3rd	R1				Charles Robson	Jack Farrell	14	Charles Baker Samuel Meston	18	
1896–97	SL Div 1	20	15	5	0	63	18	35	1st	R2				Alfred McMinn	Jack Farrell	20	Robert Buchanan George Clawley Jack Farrell William McMillan	20	
1897–98	SL Div 1	22	18	1	3	53	18	37	1st	SF				Er Arnfield	Robert Buchanan	16	George Clawley Harry Haynes Samuel Meston	22	
1898–99	SL Div 1	24	15	5	4	54	24	35	1st	R2				Er Arnfield	Abe Hartley Harry Wood	16	Jack Robinson Harry Wood	24	
1899–1900	SL Div 1	28	17	1	10	70	33	35	3rd	RU (Note: Southampton's first appearance in the Cup Final, a 4–0 defeat to First Division side Bury.)				Er Arnfield	Alf Milward	28	Alf Milward	28	
1900–01	SL Div 1	28	18	5	5	58	26	41	1st	R1				Er Arnfield	Edgar Chadwick	15	Samuel Meston Alf Milward George Molyneux	28	
1901–02	SL Div 1	30	18	6	6	71	28	42	3rd	RU (Note: Southampton's second appearance in the Cup Final, a 2–1 replay defeat to First Division side Sheffield United.)				Er Arnfield	Albert Brown	29	Tommy Bowman Bert Lee George Molyneux	27	
1902–03	SL Div 1	30	20	8	2	83	20	48	1st	R1				Er Arnfield	Fred Harrison	17	Bert Lee	29	
1903–04	SL Div 1	34	22	6	6	75	30	50	1st	R2				Er Arnfield	Fred Harrison	27	Tommy Bowman George Molyneux	34	
1904–05	SL Div 1	34	18	7	9	54	40	43	3rd	QF				Er Arnfield	Edgar Bluff	13	Bert Lee	33	
1905–06	SL Div 1	34	19	7	8	58	39	45	2nd	QF				Er Arnfield	Harry Brown Fred Harrison	14	Fred Mouncher	32	
1906–07	SL Div 1	38	13	9	16	49	56	35	11th	R2				Er Arnfield	Fred Harrison	12	George Clawley	37	
1907–08	SL Div 1	38	16	6	16	51	60	38	11th	SF				Er Arnfield	Frank Costello	12	Frank Thorpe	35	
1908–09	SL Div 1	40	19	10	11	67	58	48	3rd	R1				Er Arnfield	Arthur Hughes	15	Jack Eastham	37	
1909–10	SL Div 1	42	16	16	10	64	55	48	5th	R2				Er Arnfield	Charlie McGibbon	20	Tom Burrows Frank Jefferis	41	
1910–11	SL Div 1	38	11	8	19	42	67	30	17th	R1				Er Arnfield	Harry Brown Martin Dunne	9	Jack Eastham	34	
1911–12	SL Div 1	38	10	11	17	46	63	31	16th	R1				George Swift	Henry Hamilton	9	John Denby Jim McAlpine	33	
1912–13	SL Div 1	38	10	11	17	40	72	31	16th	R1				Er Arnfield	Percy Prince	11	Sid Ireland	38	
1913–14	SL Div 1	38	15	7	16	55	54	37	11th	R1				Er Arnfield	Arthur Dominy	13	Len Andrews	37	
1914–15	SL Div 1	38	19	5	14	78	74	43	6th	R3				Er Arnfield	Arthur Dominy	30	Arthur Dominy	37	
The Southern League and FA Cup were suspended until after the First World War.
1919–20	SL Div 1	42	18	8	16	72	63	44	8th	R3				Jimmy McIntyre	Arthur Dominy	20	Joe Barratt Arthur Dominy Jimmy Moore	41	
1920–21	Div 3	42	19	16	7	64	28	54	2nd	R3				Jimmy McIntyre	Bill Rawlings	22	Fred Foxall Jimmy Moore Bill Turner	42	
1921–22	Div 3(S)	42	23	15	4	68	21	61	1st ↑	R2				Jimmy McIntyre	Bill Rawlings	32	Tommy Allen Bert Shelley Fred Titmuss	42	
1922–23	Div 2	42	14	14	14	40	40	42	11th	QF				Jimmy McIntyre	Arthur Dominy	17	Bert Shelley	42	
1923–24	Div 2	42	17	14	11	52	31	48	5th	R3				Jimmy McIntyre	Bill Rawlings	21	Tommy Allen Bert Shelley	42	
1924–25	Div 2	42	13	18	11	40	36	44	7th	SF				Jimmy McIntyre George Goss	Bill Rawlings	16	Bill Rawlings Bert Shelley	41	
1925–26	Div 2	42	15	8	19	63	63	38	14th	R3				Arthur Chadwick	Bill Rawlings	20	Stan Woodhouse	37	
1926–27	Div 2	42	15	12	15	60	62	42	13th	SF				Arthur Chadwick	Bill Rawlings	28	Tommy Allen Michael Keeping	42	
1927–28	Div 2	42	14	7	21	68	77	35	17th	R3				Arthur Chadwick	Bill Rawlings	21	George Harkus	41	
1928–29	Div 2	42	17	14	11	74	60	48	4th	R3				Arthur Chadwick	Willie Haines	16	Bert Shelley	41	
1929–30	Div 2	42	17	11	14	77	76	45	7th	R3				Arthur Chadwick	Dick Rowley	26	Willie White	40	
1930–31	Div 2	42	19	6	17	74	62	44	9th	R3				Arthur Chadwick	Willie Haines	15	Arthur Bradford Bert Jepson	39	
1931–32	Div 2	42	17	7	18	66	77	41	14th	R3				George Kay	Johnny Arnold	20	Bill Adams	42	
1932–33	Div 2	42	18	5	19	66	66	41	12th	R3				George Kay	Ted Drake	20	Bill Luckett	42	
1933–34	Div 2	42	15	8	19	54	58	38	14th	R3				George Kay	Ted Drake	23	Dick Neal	41	
1934–35	Div 2	42	11	12	19	46	75	34	19th	R4				George Kay	Laurie Fishlock	9	Fred Tully	40	
1935–36	Div 2	42	14	9	19	47	65	37	17th	R3				George Kay	Vic Watson	14	Charlie Sillett	42	
1936–37	Div 2	42	11	12	19	53	77	34	19th	R3				George Goss Tom Parker	Jimmy Dunne	14	Billy Kingdon Charlie Sillett	41	
1937–38	Div 2	42	15	9	18	55	77	39	15th	R3				Tom Parker	Harry Osman	22	Harry Osman	40	
1938–39	Div 2	42	13	9	20	56	82	35	18th	R3				Tom Parker	Fred Briggs	14	Billy Bevis Harry Brophy Sam Warhurst	37	
1939–40	Div 2 (Note: The 1939–40 season was abandoned in early September and all results annulled.)	3	1	0	2	5	6	2	17th					Tom Parker	N/A		N/A		N/A
The Football League and FA Cup were suspended until after the Second World War.
1945–46	The Football League was not resumed in 1945–46 due to planning difficulties from the war.									R4				Arthur Dominy Bill Dodgin	Jack Bradley Doug McGibbon	2	N/A		N/A
1946–47	Div 2	42	15	9	18	69	76	39	14th	R4				Bill Dodgin	Jack Bradley George Lewis	15	Bill Rochford	41	16,039
1947–48	Div 2	42	21	10	11	71	53	52	3rd	QF				Bill Dodgin	Charlie Wayman	19	Alf Ramsey	42	
1948–49	Div 2	42	23	9	10	69	36	55	3rd	R3				Bill Dodgin	Charlie Wayman	32	Eric Webber	42	
1949–50	Div 2	42	19	14	9	64	48	52	4th	R3				Sid Cann	Charlie Wayman	26	George Curtis Eric Webber	42	
1950–51	Div 2	42	15	13	14	66	73	43	12th	R4				Sid Cann	Eddy Brown	22	Joe Mallett	42	
1951–52	Div 2	42	15	11	16	61	73	41	13th	R3				Sid Cann George Roughton	Eddy Brown	12	Eric Day	42	
1952–53	Div 2	42	10	13	19	68	85	33	21st ↓	R5				George Roughton	Frank Dudley	15	Eric Day	42	
1953–54	Div 3(S)	46	22	7	17	76	63	51	6th	R1				George Roughton	Eric Day	27	Eric Day	46	
1954–55	Div 3(S)	46	24	11	11	75	51	59	3rd	R2				George Roughton	Eric Day	29	Tommy Traynor Len Wilkins	46	
1955–56	Div 3(S)	46	18	8	20	91	81	44	14th (Note: Lowest League finish.)	R2				Ted Bates	Eric Day	29	Eric Day	45	
1956–57	Div 3(S)	46	22	10	14	76	52	54	4th	R3				Ted Bates	Derek Reeves	21	Pat Parker	46	
1957–58	Div 3(S)	46	22	10	14	112	72	54	6th	R2		Southern Floodlit Cup	R1	Ted Bates	Derek Reeves	35	Terry Paine	44	
1958–59	Div 3	46	17	11	18	88	80	45	14th	R3		Southern Floodlit Cup	R2	Ted Bates	Derek Reeves	17	Terry Paine	46	
1959–60	Div 3	46	26	9	11	106	75	61	1st ↑	R4		Southern Floodlit Cup	SF	Ted Bates	Derek Reeves	45	Ron Davies Terry Paine Derek Reeves	46	
1960–61	Div 2	42	18	8	16	84	81	44	8th	R4	QF			Ted Bates	George O'Brien	27	Terry Paine	42	
1961–62	Div 2	42	18	9	15	77	62	45	6th	R3	R1			Ted Bates	George O'Brien	30	Brian Clifton Cliff Huxford Tony Knapp	42	
1962–63	Div 2	42	17	8	17	72	67	42	11th	SF	R2			Ted Bates	George O'Brien	30	Tony Knapp George O'Brien Terry Paine	42	
1963–64	Div 2	42	19	9	14	100	73	47	5th	R3	R2			Ted Bates	Martin Chivers Terry Paine	22	Cliff Huxford	42	
1964–65	Div 2	42	17	14	11	83	63	48	4th	R4	R3			Ted Bates	George O'Brien	37	Terry Paine	42	
1965–66	Div 2	42	22	10	10	85	56	54	2nd ↑	R3	R3			Ted Bates	Martin Chivers	33	John Sydenham	41	
1966–67	Div 1	42	14	6	22	74	92	34	19th	R4	R3			Ted Bates	Ron Davies	43	Martin Chivers Jimmy Melia Terry Paine	42	
1967–68	Div 1	42	13	11	18	66	83	37	16th	R4	R2			Ted Bates	Ron Davies	28	Terry Paine	41	
1968–69	Div 1	42	16	13	13	57	48	45	7th	R4	QF			Ted Bates	Ron Davies	24	Terry Paine	42	
1969–70	Div 1	42	6	17	19	46	67	29	19th	R4	R2	Inter-Cities Fairs Cup	R3	Ted Bates	Mick Channon	21	Mick Channon Jimmy Gabriel	39	
1970–71	Div 1	42	17	12	13	56	44	46	7th	R5	R2			Ted Bates	Ron Davies	21	Mick Channon Hugh Fisher Joe Kirkup Brian O'Neil	42	
1971–72	Div 1	42	12	7	23	52	80	31	19th	R3	R3	UEFA Cup	R1	Ted Bates	Mick Channon	17	Mick Channon Eric Martin	42	
1972–73	Div 1	42	11	18	13	47	52	40	13th	R3	R3			Ted Bates	Mick Channon	18	Hugh Fisher Eric Martin	42	
1973–74	Div 1	42	11	14	17	47	68	36	20th ↓	R5	R4			Ted Bates Lawrie McMenemy	Mick Channon	23	Hugh Fisher	42	
1974–75	Div 2	42	15	11	16	53	54	41	13th	R3	R4	Texaco Cup	RU	Lawrie McMenemy	Mick Channon	24	Mick Channon Peter Osgood	40	
1975–76	Div 2	42	21	7	14	66	50	49	6th	W	R2			Lawrie McMenemy	Mick Channon	25	Mick Channon	42	
1976–77	Div 2	42	17	10	15	72	67	44	9th	R5	R2	FA Charity Shield	RU	Lawrie McMenemy	Ted MacDougall	26	Mick Channon	40	
1976–77	Div 2	42	17	10	15	72	67	44	9th	R5	R2	European Cup Winners' Cup	QF	Lawrie McMenemy	Ted MacDougall	26	Mick Channon	40	
1977–78	Div 2	42	22	13	7	70	39	57	2nd ↑	R4	R3			Lawrie McMenemy	Phil Boyer	19	Alan Ball Phil Boyer Mike Pickering	41	
1978–79	Div 1	42	12	16	14	47	53	40	14th	QF	RU			Lawrie McMenemy	Phil Boyer	16	Alan Ball Phil Boyer Malcolm Waldron	42	
1979–80	Div 1	42	18	9	15	65	53	45	8th	R3	R3			Lawrie McMenemy	Phil Boyer	25	Phil Boyer	42	
1980–81	Div 1	42	20	10	12	76	56	50	6th	R5	R2			Lawrie McMenemy	Steve Moran	20	Mick Channon Chris Nicholl	42	
1981–82	Div 1	42	19	9	14	72	67	66	7th	R3	R2	UEFA Cup	R2	Lawrie McMenemy	Kevin Keegan	30	David Armstrong Kevin Keegan	41	
1982–83	Div 1	42	15	12	15	54	58	57	12th	R3	R4	UEFA Cup	R1	Lawrie McMenemy	Danny Wallace	13	Chris Nicholl	42	
1983–84	Div 1	42	22	11	9	66	38	77	2nd (Note: Highest League finish.)	SF	R3			Lawrie McMenemy	Steve Moran	25	David Armstrong Nick Holmes Peter Shilton	42	
1984–85	Div 1	42	19	11	12	56	47	68	5th	R5	R4	UEFA Cup	R1	Lawrie McMenemy	Steve Moran	18	Mick Mills	42	
1985–86	Div 1	42	12	10	20	51	62	46	14th	SF	R4			Chris Nicholl	David Armstrong	15	David Armstrong	41	
1986–87	Div 1	42	14	10	18	69	68	52	12th	R3	SF			Chris Nicholl	Colin Clarke	22	Glenn Cockerill	42	
1987–88	Div 1	40	12	14	14	49	53	50	12th	R4	R2			Chris Nicholl	Colin Clarke	17	Colin Clarke	40	
1988–89	Div 1	38	10	15	13	52	66	45	13th	R3	QF			Chris Nicholl	Rod Wallace	14	Rod Wallace	38	
1989–90	Div 1	38	15	10	13	71	63	55	7th	R5	QF			Chris Nicholl	Matthew Le Tissier	24	Rod Wallace	38	
1990–91	Div 1	38	12	9	17	58	69	45	14th	R5	QF			Chris Nicholl	Matthew Le Tissier	23	Barry Horne	38	15,413
1991–92	Div 1	42	14	10	18	39	55	52	16th	QF	R4	Full Members Cup	RU	Ian Branfoot	Alan Shearer	18	Tim Flowers Alan Shearer	41	14,070
1992–93	Premier League	42	13	11	18	54	61	50	18th	R3	R3			Ian Branfoot	Matthew Le Tissier	18	Tim Flowers	42	15,148
1993–94	Premier League	42	12	7	23	49	66	43	18th	R3	R2			Ian Branfoot Alan Ball	Matthew Le Tissier	25	Jeff Kenna Neil Maddison	41	14,751
1994–95	Premier League	42	12	18	12	61	63	54	10th	R5	R3			Alan Ball	Matthew Le Tissier	29	Jim Magilton	42	14,685
1995–96	Premier League	38	9	11	18	34	52	38	17th	QF	R4			Dave Merrington	Neil Shipperley	12	Jason Dodd Neil Shipperley	37	14,820
1996–97	Premier League	38	10	11	17	50	56	41	16th	R3	QF			Graeme Souness	Matthew Le Tissier	17	Jim Magilton	37	15,099
1997–98	Premier League	38	14	6	18	50	55	48	12th	R3	R4			Dave Jones	Matthew Le Tissier	14	Paul Jones	38	15,159
1998–99	Premier League	38	11	8	19	37	64	41	17th	R3	R2			Dave Jones	Egil Østenstad	8	James Beattie	35	15,140
1999–2000	Premier League	38	12	8	18	45	62	44	15th	R4	R4			Dave Jones Glenn Hoddle	Marian Pahars	13	Dean Richards	35	15,132
2000–01	Premier League	38	14	10	14	40	48	52	10th	R5	R3			Glenn Hoddle	James Beattie	12	Wayne Bridge Claus Lundekvam	38	15,115
2001–02	Premier League	38	12	9	17	46	54	45	11th	R3	R3			Stuart Gray Gordon Strachan	Marian Pahars	16	Wayne Bridge	38	30,633 (Note: 2001–02 season was the inaugural season at St Mary's Stadium.)
2002–03	Premier League	38	13	13	12	43	46	52	8th	RU	R3			Gordon Strachan	James Beattie	24	James Beattie	38	30,680
2003–04	Premier League	38	12	11	15	44	45	47	12th	R3	QF	UEFA Cup	R1	Gordon Strachan Paul Sturrock	James Beattie	17	James Beattie Paul Telfer	37	31,716
2004–05	Premier League	38	6	14	18	45	66	32	20th ↓	QF	R4			Paul Sturrock Steve Wigley Harry Redknapp	Peter Crouch	16	Rory Delap	37	30,609
2005–06	Champ	46	13	19	14	49	50	58	12th	R5	R4			Harry Redknapp George Burley	Ricardo Fuller	9	Danny Higginbotham	37	23,613
2006–07	Champ	46	21	12	13	77	53	75	6th	R4	R3			George Burley	Grzegorz Rasiak	21	Chris Baird	44	23,556
2007–08	Champ	46	13	15	18	56	72	54	20th	R5	R1			George Burley Nigel Pearson	Stern John	19	Stern John Andrew Surman	40	21,081
2008–09	Champ	46	10	15	21	46	69	45	23rd ↓	R3	R3			Jan Poortvliet Mark Wotte	David McGoldrick	14	Kelvin Davis David McGoldrick	46	18,149
2009–10	League 1	46	23	14	9	85	47	73	7th	R5	R2	Football League Trophy	W	Alan Pardew	Rickie Lambert	36	Rickie Lambert	45	20,108
2010–11	League 1	46	28	8	10	86	38	92	2nd ↑	R4	R2	Football League Trophy	R1	Alan Pardew Dean Wilkins Nigel Adkins	Rickie Lambert	21	Kelvin Davis	46	21,726
2011–12	Champ	46	26	10	10	85	46	88	2nd ↑	R4	R4			Nigel Adkins	Rickie Lambert	31	Jack Cork	46	26,420
2012–13	Premier League	38	9	14	15	49	60	41	14th	R3	R4			Nigel Adkins Mauricio Pochettino	Rickie Lambert	15	Rickie Lambert	38	30,874
2013–14	Premier League	38	15	11	12	54	46	56	8th	R5	R4			Mauricio Pochettino	Jay Rodriguez	17	Adam Lallana	38	30,211
2014–15	Premier League	38	18	6	14	54	33	60	7th	R4	QF			Ronald Koeman	Graziano Pellè	16	Graziano Pellè	38	30,652
2015–16	Premier League	38	18	9	11	59	41	63	6th	R3	R5	Europa League	PO	Ronald Koeman	Sadio Mané	15	José Fonte	37	30,750
2016–17	Premier League	38	12	10	16	41	48	46	8th	R4	RU	Europa League	GS	Claude Puel	Charlie Austin	9	Fraser Forster	38	30,936
2017–18	Premier League	38	7	15	16	37	56	36	17th	SF	R2			Mauricio Pellegrino Mark Hughes	Charlie Austin Dušan Tadić	7	Dušan Tadić	36	30,138
2018–19	Premier League	38	9	12	17	45	65	39	16th	R3	R4			Mark Hughes Ralph Hasenhüttl	Nathan Redmond	9	Nathan Redmond	38	29,365
2019–20	Premier League	38	15	7	16	51	60	52	11th	R4	R4			Ralph Hasenhüttl	Danny Ings	25	Danny Ings James Ward-Prowse	38	29,675 (not including 'Behind closed doors' matches)
2020–21	Premier League	38	12	7	19	47	68	43	15th	SF	R2			Ralph Hasenhüttl	Danny Ings	13	James Ward-Prowse	38	3,763 (Note: All but three of the league fixtures in the 2020–21 season were played behind closed doors due to the COVID-19 pandemic in the United Kingdom.)
2021–22	Premier League	38	9	13	16	43	67	40	15th	QF	R4			Ralph Hasenhüttl	James Ward-Prowse	10	James Ward-Prowse Oriol Romeu	36	29,939
2022–23	Premier League	38	6	7	25	36	73	25	20th ↓	R5	SF			Ralph Hasenhüttl Nathan Jones Rubén Sellés	James Ward-Prowse	9	James Ward-Prowse	38	30,416
2023–24	Champ	46	26	9	11	87	63	87	4th (Note: Won in the play-off final to Leeds United, 1–0) ↑	R5	R1			Russell Martin	Adam Armstrong	21	Adam Armstrong	46	29,373
2024–25	Premier League	38	2	6	30	26	86	12	20th ↓	R4	QF			Russell Martin Simon Rusk Ivan Jurić	Cameron Archer	5	Mateus Fernandes	36	30,865
2025–26	Championship	46	22	14	10	82	56	80	4th	SF	R3			Will Still Tonda Eckert	Adam Armstrong Finn Azaz Ross Stewart	11	Ryan Manning	43	28,532

=== Overall (since 1920–21) ===
- Seasons spent at Level 1 of the football league system: 47
- Seasons spent at Level 2 of the football league system: 40
- Seasons spent at Level 3 of the football league system: 12
- Seasons spent at Level 4 of the football league system: 0
