= Percy Prince =

English footballer (1887–1973)

Personal information
- Date of birth: 15 August 1887
- Place of birth: Liverpool, England
- Date of death: December 1973 (aged 86)
- Place of death: Rutherford, New Jersey, US
- Height: 5 ft 10 in (1.78 m)
- Positions: Centre forward; half back

Youth career
- Cranbury Avenue, Southampton
- Southampton Oxford

Senior career*
Years	Team	Apps	(Gls)
1907–1914	Southampton	79	(25)
1914–1917	Boscombe		
1919–1920	Southampton	4	(0)
1920–1921	Boscombe		
- * Club domestic league appearances and goals

Percy Prince (15 August 1887 – December 1973) was an English amateur footballer who played as a centre-forward for Southampton and Boscombe in the early 20th century.

== Football career ==
Prince was born in Liverpool but was raised in Southampton and played his club football on Southampton Common, while working in the Merchant Navy.

He was signed by Southern League Southampton as an amateur in 1907 and made his first team debut away to New Brompton on 17 October 1908. In the next match, against Millwall he scored in a 4–1 victory at The Dell, but made only one further appearance that season, followed by two further appearances at the end of the 1909–10 season, scoring in both matches. He was the first-choice centre-forward at the start of the next season, scoring in a 3–0 victory over Portsmouth on 10 September 1910, before losing his place to Sid Kimpton.

Described as a "sharp-shooting centre-forward, keen and enthusiastic " but with a genial nature, "there was none more zealous in the interests of the team". He was known as "Peewee" to his teammates.

He finally became established in the side, playing at inside left in December 1911, taking over from Andrew Gibson, but after a run of nine games in which he scored twice, Prince lost his place back to Gibson. In March 1912 Gibson was suspended (along with Henry Hamilton) for a "serious breach of club discipline", as a result of which both players were placed on the transfer list. This led to Prince's restoration to the team which he marked by scoring four goals in three matches.

In the 1912–13 season, Prince only missed eight matches scoring eleven league goals, making him the club's top scorer for the season. In the following season, he continued to be a regular starter but was pushed out onto the wing in more of a supporting role to Len Andrews and Arthur Dominy, and his scoring ability faded before he lost his place in January 1914 to Bill Smith, who in turn was replaced by Arthur Hollins.

In the summer of 1914, Prince was released by Southampton and joined Boscombe in the Hampshire League. The outbreak of World War I interrupted his career but he turned out occasionally for Boscombe during the wartime period until returning to Southampton in 1917, where he played for his former club in the wartime leagues.

At the cessation of hostilities, Prince re-joined Southampton in August 1919 and made four further appearances. in place of Bert Fenwick in the Saints' final Southern League. Prince was now playing at half back and his final appearance was in a 2–6 defeat at The Dell by Northampton Town on 25 October 1919. Although he did not make further appearances in the first team, Prince continued to play for the reserves, gaining Hampshire League and Senior Cup medals, as well as gaining representative honours with Hampshire.

He returned to Boscombe in November 1920, before retiring the following summer.

== Life outside football ==
Prince was employed by the Cunard Line for 32 years and in 1930 he moved to New York City as assistant catering officer, servicing the trans-Atlantic ocean liners from Southampton, including RMS Aquitania and RMS Queen Mary.

Prince retired in 1952, and continued to live in Rutherford, New Jersey, where he died in December 1973 at Bergen Pines Hospital in nearby Paramus.
