= Frank Grayer =

English footballer (1890–1961)

Personal information
- Date of birth: 13 February 1890
- Place of birth: Southampton, England
- Date of death: 21 January 1961 (aged 70)
- Place of death: Southampton, England
- Height: 6 ft 0 in (1.83 m)
- Position: Full-back

Youth career
- Fazeley
- St Mary's Athletic (Southampton)

Senior career*
Years	Team	Apps	(Gls)
1908–1912	Southampton	6	(0)
1912–1915	Liverpool	1	(0)
- * Club domestic league appearances and goals

Frank Grayer (13 February 1890 – 21 January 1961) was an English footballer who played as a full-back for Southampton and Liverpool in the period prior to World War I.

== Football career ==
Grayer was born in Southampton. (Note: Some sources list Grayer as being born in Brighton) He was educated at St. Denys school and played football for the school and later with St Mary's Athletic. Described as "a modest and unassuming youngster", he was selected to join Southampton's professional staff after a successful trial in August 1908.

He spent his early years at The Dell playing in the reserves and it was not until two days before his 21st birthday, on 11 February 1911, that he eventually made his first-team debut in a Southern League match at Swindon Town, replacing Jack Eastham at right-back. Although he was a "solid, reliable performer at full back with a good turn of speed", he found first-team chances hard to come by, making only six appearances in his four years with the "Saints". The return of Dan Gordon in 1911 reduced his chances of regular football even further and in July 1912, the Saints accepted an offer of £100 from Liverpool of the Football League First Division.

On Merseyside, he again found few opportunities of first-team football and in three seasons at Anfield, his only Football League appearance came on 15 April 1914 when he replaced regular right-back Ephraim Longworth in a 2–1 defeat against Manchester United.

== Later career ==
During World War I, he enlisted in the Army and was badly injured at Ypres. He never fully recovered from his injuries and was unable to resume his football career after the cessation of hostilities. Instead, he found employment with a furniture company, Shepherd & Hedger, where he remained until his retirement in 1955.
