= Peter Allen (footballer) =

English footballer (1946–2023)

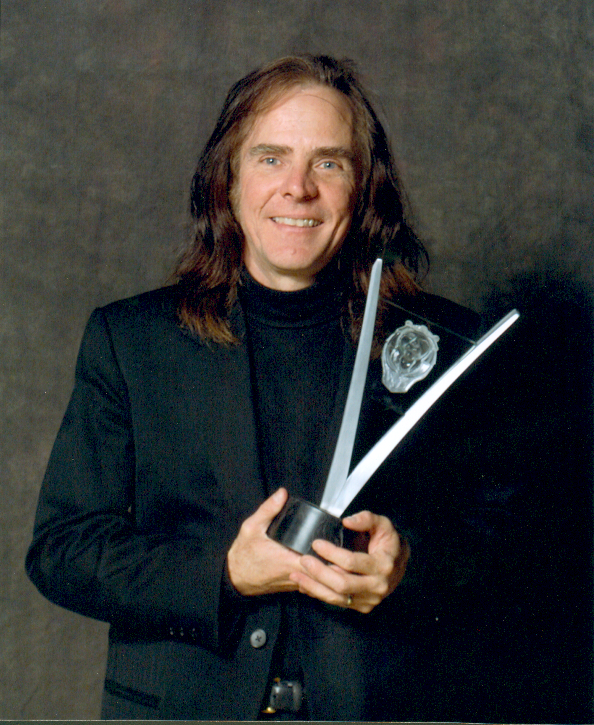
- Peter Allen at the 2004 Leo Awards

Personal information
- Full name: Peter Charles Allen
- Date of birth: 1 November 1946
- Place of birth: Hove, Sussex, England
- Date of death: 5 February 2023 (aged 76)
- Position: Midfielder

Senior career*
Years	Team	Apps	(Gls)
1965–1978	Leyton Orient	432	(27)
1978	Millwall	18	(0)
- * Club domestic league appearances and goals

Peter Charles Allen (1 November 1946 – 5 February 2023) was an English footballer who played as a midfielder, and is the current holder of Leyton Orient's all-time appearance record. He is the only player to have played more than 400 times for Orient.

Allen joined Tottenham Hotspur as a schoolboy, where he was spotted by Orient manager Dave Sexton. Allen turned professional at Orient in July 1965, and made his debut in September of that year. During the late 1960s, he became a regular in the first team, playing in over 40 league matches per season from 1968 to 1973. In 1970, he turned down an offer from Everton.

Allen was noted at Orient for his versatility, able to play in defence when required, as well as being capable of scoring goals from midfield. He earned a testimonial in 1976, the year he broke Orient's appearance record, previously held by Arthur Wood. In all competitions, Allen made 491 appearances for the club, scoring 29 goals.

Allen left Orient in March 1978 to join Millwall, but only stayed briefly before retiring due to injury at the age of 32. He subsequently qualified as a solicitor, and set up his own partnership in Portslade in 1988.

Allen died on 5 February 2023, at the age of 76.
