= Edgar Bluff =

English footballer

Personal information
- Full name: Edgar Underwood Bluff
- Date of birth: 19 March 1882
- Place of birth: Attercliffe, Sheffield, England
- Date of death: May 1952 (aged 70)
- Place of death: Northampton, England
- Height: 5 ft 7 in (1.70 m)
- Position: Inside forward

Youth career
- Yorkshire Light Infantry
- First Army Corps

Senior career*
Years	Team	Apps	(Gls)
1904–1905	Southampton	27	(10)
1905–1907	Sheffield United	65	(18)
1907–1908	Birmingham	9	(1)
1908–19??	St Helens Town		
- * Club domestic league appearances and goals

Edgar Underwood Bluff (19 March 1882 – May 1952) was an English professional association footballer who played as an inside forward for various clubs in the 1900s.

== Playing career ==
Born in Attercliffe, Sheffield he joined the Yorkshire Light Infantry in March 1900, where he served for four years. In April 1904 Southern League champions Southampton were seeking a replacement for the ageing Harry Wood. Bluff was spotted playing for the First Army Corps and the "Saints" directors were so impressed that they paid for his discharge from the Army, in time for Southampton's summer tour of South America, during which they played teams representing Argentina (when he scored four goals) and Uruguay, winning 8–0 and 8–1 respectively.

He made his league debut on 24 September 1904 and soon formed an exciting partnership with Fred Harrison. According to Holley & Chalk, "his army discipline and training served him in good stead" and "he displayed a natural goal-scoring ability", his heading being "a strong feature of his game". In his first season at The Dell he was top scorer (with George Hedley) with ten league goals, plus a further three in the FA Cup.

His form earned him a call-up to the England international squad where he was first reserve for a match against Ireland in 1905.

In the summer of 1905 the Southern League introduced a wage limit which resulted in the transfer of several players, including Bluff who reluctantly moved back to Yorkshire to join Sheffield United. At Bramall Lane he was never quite able to re-capture the form he had shown in Southampton, although he did score eleven goals in 1906–07, helping United to finish fourth in the First Division. In December 1907 he moved on to Birmingham for six months, followed by a spell with St Helens Town.

He died in Northampton at the age of 70.
