= Arthur Hollins =

Arthur Hollins may refer to:

- Arthur Hollins (politician) (1876–1962), English Member of Parliament for Hanley (UK Parliament constituency) in the 1920s and 1930s
- Arthur Hollins (footballer), English footballer with Walsall and Southampton in the 1910s
- Sir Arthur Hollins, 2nd Baronet (1876–1938), English cricketer and football administrator
