= Harry Brown (footballer, born 1883) =

English footballer (1883-1934)

Personal information
- Full name: Henry Brown
- Date of birth: 11 November 1883
- Place of birth: Northampton, England
- Date of death: 9 February 1934 (aged 50)
- Place of death: Basingstoke, England
- Position: Inside forward

Youth career
- St Sepulchre's (Northampton)

Senior career*
Years	Team	Apps	(Gls)
1902–1903	Northampton Town		
1903–1905	West Bromwich Albion	35	(5)
1905–1906	Southampton	18	(10)
1906–1907	Newcastle United	24	(8)
1907–1908	Bradford Park Avenue		
1908–1910	Fulham	53	(21)
1910–1913	Southampton	54	(16)
1913–1914	Woolston		
- * Club domestic league appearances and goals

Henry Brown (11 November 1883 – 9 February 1934) was an English footballer who played as an inside forward for various clubs in the early part of the twentieth century, including West Bromwich Albion, Newcastle United, Fulham and Southampton (two spells). At Newcastle, he was a member of the team that won the Football League championship in 1906–07.

== Football career ==
=== Northampton Town and West Bromwich Albion ===
Brown was born in Northampton and started his professional career in 1902 with Northampton Town in the Southern League before moving up to the Football League, joining West Bromwich Albion in November 1903. He scored three goals in 21 league appearances but was unable to prevent Albion from being relegated from the First Division at the end of the 1903–04 season.

He spent one more season with Albion in the Second Division before moving back to the Southern League when he joined Southampton in April 1905.

=== Southampton (1905–1906) ===
Brown made his "Saints" debut on 23 September 1905, when he replaced George Harris at inside-left in a 2–1 victory at Northampton. For the rest of the season, the No. 10 shirt would alternate between Brown and Harris.

Described as "a clever ball player", Brown had a "deceptive style which often disconcerted his opponents" thus giving his team-mates goal-scoring opportunities. He was also a goal-scorer in his own right and in his first season at The Dell he scored ten league and four FA Cup goals from a total of 23 appearances, thus making him the club's top goal-scorer (with Fred Harrison) for the 1905–06 season. Included in his goal tally were a hat-trick in a 9–1 victory over his home-town club, Northampton Town, on 27 January 1906 and two against local rivals, Portsmouth, in a 5–1 victory in the FA Cup on 13 January.

=== Newcastle United ===
His goal-scoring talents were noticed by Newcastle United and in May 1906 he accepted the "tempting terms" offered to him and moved to St James' Park for a fee of £380, together with his Southampton team-mate Jimmy Soye. He made an immediate impact on Tyneside, scoring a hat-trick on his debut in a 4–2 victory at Birmingham City on 8 September 1906. His spell at Newcastle was brief but highly successful, as they claimed the Football League championship at the end of the 1906–07 season by three points over Bristol City. Brown also scored twice on 9 March 1907 in the Charity Shield Final in a 5–2 victory over top amateur club Corinthian.

Although Brown made two appearances at the start of the following season, he lost his place at inside left to Finlay Speedie and in October 1907 he moved to Bradford Park Avenue.

=== Bradford Park Avenue and Fulham ===
Bradford had previously been a rugby union team and had only started playing football in 1907 and, despite their geographical situation, were playing their inaugural season in the Southern League.

After six months with Bradford, Brown returned to the Football League when he joined Fulham in March 1908. He remained with Fulham for two full seasons in the Second Division (finishing in the upper part of the table) before returning to Southampton in September 1910.

=== Southampton (1910–1913) ===
Brown decided to retire to Southampton and had bought the Kingsland Tavern in St Mary's Street from another ex-Saint, Tom Nicol. The "Saints" had made a poor start to the 1910–11 Southern League season having won only once in their first six games, and Brown was persuaded to re-join the club in October, replacing Bill Buckenham who returned to the Army. With Brown playing alongside Frank Jefferis and new signings Sid Kimpton and Martin Dunne, the team started to turn the season round and in the six weeks from the start of November 1910 they won six out of seven games with Brown scoring six goals, including a hat-trick in a 5–0 victory over Plymouth Argyle. From January onwards, however, the season took a turn for the worse and the team only managed two more victories narrowly avoiding relegation at the end of the season, with Brown only scoring twice more. Nonetheless, Brown's tally of nine league and cup goals made him the club's top goal-scorer for the season, jointly with Dunne.

By now, Brown had begun to slow but his "clever touches ... served the club well" for two further seasons, in both of which the Saints continued to struggle at the lower end of the table finishing a few places above the relegation zone. In 1911–12, Brown shared the inside-left duties with Archie Small, scoring seven goals from 29 league appearances, but in 1912–13 he only made six appearances and his final match came on 23 November 1912 (a 2–0 home victory over Plymouth Argyle), a week after the team had suffered their worst-ever defeat in a competitive match, losing 8–0 at Crystal Palace.

In his two spells for Southampton, Brown made a total of 81 appearances in all competitions, scoring 31 goals.

== After football ==
In the summer of 1913, Brown retired although he did turn out for local club Woolston until the outbreak of World War I. During the war, he worked in motor transport and afterwards he took over a greengrocery shop in Padwell Road, about half a mile from The Dell.

In 1933, he contracted a virus which attacked his optic nerve causing him to lose his sight. The disease spread rapidly, and he died in February 1934 aged only 50.

== Honours ==
Newcastle United

- Football League champions: 1906–07
- Charity Shield winners: 1907
