= Jack Eastham =

English footballer (1882–1932)

Personal information
- Full name: John Bilborough Eastham
- Date of birth: 23 December 1882
- Place of birth: Blackburn, England
- Date of death: 3 May 1932 (aged 49)
- Place of death: Stalybridge, England
- Height: 5 ft 10 in (1.78 m)
- Position: Full back

Youth career
- St Peter's School

Senior career*
| Years | Team | Apps | (Gls) |
| 1900–1905 | Blackburn Rovers | 48 | (0) |
| 1905–1906 | Glossop | 26 | (0) |
| 1906–1912 | Southampton | 161 | (4) |
- * Club domestic league appearances and goals

John Bilborough Eastham (23 December 1882 – 3 May 1932) was an English footballer who spent most of his career with Blackburn Rovers and then Southampton playing as a full back.

== Football career ==
=== Blackburn Rovers ===
Eastham was born in Blackburn, Lancashire and joined his local club, Blackburn Rovers in the First Division in March 1900, aged 17. He broke into the first-team during the 1901–02 season and in the following season became a regular at left-back, partnering England international Bob Crompton.

In 1903–04, the arrival of Scottish international Jock Cameron from St Mirren restricted Eastham's appearances and he spent the entire 1904–05 season in the reserves.

=== Glossop ===
In September 1905, Eastham moved to Glossop where he played in either full-back position, making 26 appearances) as the club finished near the foot of the Second Division table.

=== Southampton ===
Eastham moved to the south coast in May 1906, when he was persuaded to join Southampton, who had finished as runners-up in the Southern League in the 1905–06 season. He made an anonymous start to his career at The Dell but by the end of the 1906–07 season he had taken over the right-back position from Bill Clarke, whose career had ended following a serious knee injury. Eastham scored his first goal for the Saints in a 2–1 defeat of Bristol Rovers in the final match of the season.

In 1907–08, Eastham settled into the right-back role, although he missed two long periods through injury (when the versatile John Robertson took over) making 22 appearances in all as the "Saints" finished eleventh in the league. In the FA Cup, Eastham played in all six matches as the Saints made it through to the semi-final, after a replay in round 4, when they defeated the previous season's runners-up Everton 3–2 (including two goals from Frank Costello). In the semi-final itself, played at Stamford Bridge on 28 March 1908, the Saints were defeated by Wolverhampton Wanderers, with goals from former Southampton players Wally Radford and George Hedley.

Eastham was by now becoming "one of the club's finest right-backs during the Southern League era" who was an indispensable member of the side; described as "robust and fearless", he became team captain and provided invaluable guidance to the younger members of the team.

At the start of the 1908–09 season, the Saints reeled off seven consecutive victories before a series of injuries to key players disrupted the side, who eventually finished the season in third place, with Eastham missing only three matches. In the following season, Eastham again missed a long spell from October to December through injury.

In 1910–11, Eastham managed to avoid injury and was one of the few players to show any consistency as the Saints struggled to narrowly avoid relegation. At the start of the 1911–12 season, the club recognised Eastham's worth by granting him a benefit match against Portsmouth played on 18 September 1911. The Monday night match was poorly attended with Portsmouth playing a team consisting mainly of reserve players, who nonetheless kept the score down to 2–1, with Southampton's goals coming from Hamilton and McAlpine.

For the 1911–12 season, Southampton's new manager George Swift recruited eleven new players, but Eastham retained his place at right-back. After his testimonial match, he missed the next eight games with Dan Gordon and Frank Grayer filling in for him. Eastham returned to the line-up in mid-November, but by the end of the season he had lost his place to Gordon.

In the summer of 1912, Eastham decided to retire and returned to his home town, settling in the Blackburn area. During his six years with Southampton, he made a total of 175 appearances, scoring four goals.
