= George Kitchen =

English footballer (1876 – after 1969)

Personal information
- Full name: George William Kitchen
- Date of birth: April qtr 1876
- Place of birth: Fairfield, Derbyshire, England
- Date of death: After 1969
- Height: 6 ft 1 in (1.85 m)
- Position: Goalkeeper

Youth career
- Buxton

Senior career*
Years	Team	Apps	(Gls)
1897–1898	Stockport County		
1898–1905	Everton	87	(0)
1905–1912	West Ham United	184	(5)
1912–1914	Southampton	37	(0)
1914	Boscombe		
- * Club domestic league appearances and goals

George Kitchen (1876 – after 1969) was an English footballer who played as a goalkeeper for various clubs in the early part of the twentieth century, including long spells at Everton and West Ham United.

== Football career ==
Born in Fairfield, Derbyshire, Kitchen was an outstanding sportsman and became a professional golfer at the age of 14. He also played cricket and for a time worked as a coach at Dulwich College. He eventually decided to concentrate on football and, after a period with his local club, Buxton, playing in The Combination, he joined Stockport County, then playing in the Lancashire League.

After a year at Stockport, made the move up to the Football League, joining Everton in 1898 as cover for Scottish international, Willie Muir. Kitchen made his debut on 14 January 1899, in a 2–0 victory over Preston North End. It was not until October 1901 that he became Everton's first-choice custodian, following Muir's departure, helping Everton to reach the runners-up position in the First Division at the end of the 1901–02 season. He retained his place in the side until the arrival of Irish international Billy Scott in the summer of 1904.

After a season spent in the reserves, Kitchen was transferred in the summer of 1905 to West Ham United of the Southern League, as replacement for Matt Kingsley who had been dropped following a sending-off in March. At West Ham, Kitchen became the club's penalty taker and became the first-ever goalkeeper to score on his debut with a penalty against Swindon Town on 2 September 1905. Over the next six years, Kitchen rarely missed a match for the Hammers before losing his place to John Geggus in 1911, leading to another season in the reserves. In his seven-year span at West Ham, Kitchen made 205 appearances in the Southern League or F.A. Cup, scoring six goals.

In October 1912, he was rescued from West Ham's reserves by Southampton's new trainer, Jimmy McIntyre (who acted as "manager" under "secretary" Ernest Arnfield). Described at the time as "having the perfect build for goalkeeping", Kitchen was past his prime by the time he signed for the "Saints", but immediately replaced Bill Knight in goal, making his debut in a 0–0 draw with Coventry City on 26 October 1912. Kitchen's experience soon installed a sense of confidence into a defence that had been struggling, and Saints won five of his first ten games in goal, having only won once in the previous two months.

Kitchen remained first choice 'keeper until Ernie Steventon took over in November 1913 after which he only made two further appearances before a move to Boscombe in the 1914 close-season.

== Later career ==
Before leaving The Dell, Kitchen had secured a position as golf professional at Bournemouth Golf Course. Following his full retirement from football, he was able to continue to make a living from his second sport.

== Honours ==
Everton

- Football League First Division runners-up: 1901–02
