= Ernie Steventon =

English footballer

Personal information
- Full name: Ernest Steventon
- Date of birth: July qtr 1888
- Place of birth: Walsall, England
- Date of death: 23 November 1950 (aged 62)
- Place of death: Walsall, England
- Height: 5 ft 11 in (1.80 m)
- Position: Goalkeeper

Senior career*
Years	Team	Apps	(Gls)
1910–1912	Walsall	30	(0)
1912–1913	Wednesbury Old Athletic		
1913–1915	Southampton	44	(0)
1919	Walsall	9	(0)
- * Club domestic league appearances and goals

Ernest Steventon (1888 – 23 November 1950) was an English professional footballer who played as a goalkeeper for Southampton in the years prior to World War I.

== Football career ==
Steventon was born in Walsall, Staffordshire (now in the West Midlands) and after a spell with Walsall, then playing in the Birmingham & District League, he moved to local rivals Wednesbury Old Athletic. He soon acquired a reputation as "the best young goalkeeper in the Black Country", which brought him to the attention of Southampton of the Southern League.

Steventon joined the "Saints" in May 1913, aged 24, and was initially in the shadow of veteran goalkeeper George Kitchen. He made his debut on 8 November 1913, taking over from Kitchen after a run of four defeats, in a 2–2 draw with Crystal Palace at The Dell. Once he had established himself in the side, his agility and "safe pair of hands" quickly made the 'keeper's jersey his own, with Kitchen only making two further appearances.

Steventon made 25 league appearances in the 1913–14 season, but in 1914–15 he had to contest the goalkeeper's position with Arthur Wood, both making 19 league appearances each. The outbreak of the First World War brought Steventon's football career to a premature end, although he did make some guest appearances for Blackpool in 1917.

== Later career ==
After the war, Steventon returned to his home town, and later became a director of Walsall Football Club.
