= Bill Clarke (footballer, born 1880) =

English footballer (1880–?)

Personal information
- Full name: William Harry Clarke
- Date of birth: 1880
- Place of birth: Kettering, England
- Height: 5 ft 10 in (1.78 m)
- Position: Full back

Youth career
- Kettering

Senior career*
Years	Team	Apps	(Gls)
- Kettering St Mary's
–	Kettering		
1902–1903	Sheffield United	2	(0)
1903–1905	Northampton Town		
1905–1908	Southampton	51	(0)
- * Club domestic league appearances and goals

William Harry Clarke (born 1880) was an English professional footballer who played as a full back for various clubs in the 1900s.

== Football career ==
Clarke was born in Kettering, Northamptonshire and started his football career with his home-town club, Kettering. During his time at Kettering, they were the Midland League champions in 1900, and were elected to the Southern League. In September 1902, he moved to the Football League First Division with Sheffield United.

At Sheffield, Clarke was never a regular first-team player making only two appearances, with England international Harry Thickett being well established at right-back. In the summer of 1903, Clarke returned to Northamptonshire, to join Northampton Town in the Southern League, where he gained a reputation as "the most promising left-back in the Southern League", whose "speed enabled him to overhaul the quickest of forwards".

In April 1905, he was signed by fellow Southern League side, Southampton. The "Saints" were anxious to regain the Southern League title which they had taken six times in the eight years up to 1904, but had finished in a disappointing third place at the end of the 1904–05 season. During the close-season they signed nine players, of which Clarke was considered to be "the best capture".

He made his Southampton debut in the opening match of the 1905–06 season, a 1–0 defeat at home to Brentford, retaining his place for the rest of the season, at the end of which the Saints finished as runners-up, five points behind champions Fulham. He continued to occupy the right-back position for the start of the 1906–07 season until late December, when he fell ill. He returned in mid-February but was only able to show glimpses of his previous form; after another eight matches he suffered a serious knee injury, losing his place to Jack Eastham. Although Clarke spent several months trying to regain his fitness, he eventually retired in October 1908 without returning to the first-team.
