= Bert Fenwick =

English footballer (1900 – 1961)

Personal information
- Full name: Herbert Fenwick
- Date of birth: October qtr. 1900
- Place of birth: Wallsend, England
- Date of death: 1961 (aged 60–61)
- Height: 5 ft 8 in (1.73 m)
- Position: Half back

Senior career*
Years	Team	Apps	(Gls)
- Harland & Wolff
1919–1920	Southampton	11	(0)
- * Club domestic league appearances and goals

Herbert Fenwick (1900 – 1961) was an English professional footballer who played as a half back for Southampton in their final season in the Southern League in 1919–20.

== Football career ==
Fenwick was born in Wallsend and trained as a boilermaker. During World War I, he moved to the south coast to work in the Southampton shipyard of Harland & Wolff, where he played in their works team which won the South Hants War League in 1919.

In May 1919, he joined Southampton as a professional footballer and made his Southern League in the first match of the 1919–20 season, a 1–1 draw with Exeter City. Fenwick retained his place at right half for the first six matches, after which he was in and out of the side, with Percy Prince usually taking his place, until November when fellow former Harland and Wolff employee, Arthur Andrews took over at right half.

Unable to regain his place in the side, even after Andrews broke a leg in January, Fenwick left the area and returned to his native north-east.
