= Frank Wright (footballer) =

English footballer

Personal information
- Date of birth: October qtr, 1898
- Place of birth: Birmingham, England
- Height: 5 ft 10 in (1.78 m)
- Position: Outside right

Youth career
- Hamstead Colliery

Senior career*
Years	Team	Apps	(Gls)
1920–1921	Southampton	1	(0)
- * Club domestic league appearances and goals

Frank Wright (born 1898) was an English footballer who made one Football League appearance at outside-right for Southampton in 1920.

== Football career ==
Wright was born in Birmingham and played for Hamstead Colliery where he was spotted by a scout from Southampton. He joined the "Saints" in October 1920 and after scoring regularly for the reserves, he made his first-team debut on 11 December 1920, when he replaced Joe Barratt in a Third Division match at Grimsby Town. The team was soundly beaten 3–0, and Wright returned to the reserves together with Charlie Brown and Alec Campbell.

His brief taste of first-team football appeared to have dented his confidence, for Wright only managed one further goal in 26 subsequent reserve-team matches before he was released in May 1921.
