= Cecil Christmas =

English footballer (1886–1916)

Personal information
- Full name: Edwin Cecil Russell Christmas
- Date of birth: 13 January 1886
- Place of birth: Southampton, England
- Date of death: 7 October 1916 (aged 30)
- Place of death: Le Transloy, France
- Height: 5 ft 10 in (1.78 m)
- Position: Centre forward

Senior career*
Years	Team	Apps	(Gls)
1912	Southampton	2	(0)
- * Club domestic league appearances and goals

Edwin Cecil Russell Christmas (13 January 1886 – 7 October 1916) was an English amateur footballer who played twice for Southampton in 1912.

== Playing career ==
Born in Southampton in early 1886, he joined Southampton as an amateur in 1908 and made several appearances for the reserve team, but his business career prevented him devoting much time to football. In 1910 he left football to devote himself full-time to his family hotel business, but was persuaded to return to The Dell by reserve team manager George Carter the following year. In March 1912, following the dismissal of first choice centre forward Henry Hamilton for a serious breach of club discipline, Christmas was drafted into the first team. Despite his "pace and dribbling skills" he was not a success and he returned to the reserves.

Following serious injury, at the end of the 1911–12 season he "gave up trying to make the grade" and ended his football career.

== Military service and death ==
During the First World War he enlisted in the 1/28th (County of London) Battalion (Artists Rifles), London Regiment in June 1915, before being commissioned as second lieutenant in the 18th (Service) Battalion (Arts & Crafts) King's Royal Rifle Corps in March 1916, effective from December 1915.

He died in France on 7 October 1916, aged 30, of wounds received in action in an attempt to secure the road between Le Sars and Flers during the Battle of the Somme, and is commemorated on the Thiepval Memorial, and on the Southampton Cenotaph.

== Personal ==
Christmas was the son of Edwin and Margaret Abigail Christmas, of Southampton. He was initiated into the Freemasons' Lodge of Peace and Harmony in January 1915.
