= Martin Dunne (footballer, born 1886) =

English footballer

Personal information
- Date of birth: April 1886
- Place of birth: Padiham, England
- Date of death: 1955 (aged 68–69)
- Place of death: Burnley, England
- Position: Forward

Youth career
- East Lancashire Regiment

Senior career*
Years	Team	Apps	(Gls)
- Oswaldtwistle Rovers
- Accrington Stanley
1910–1911	Southampton	30	(9)
1911–????	Stalybridge Celtic		
- * Club domestic league appearances and goals

Martin Dunne (April 1886 – 1955) was an English footballer who played one season as a forward in the Southern League for Southampton.

== Football career ==
Dunne was born in Padiham, near Burnley and after playing for Oswaldtwistle Rovers and Accrington Stanley in the Lancashire Combination, he moved to the south coast in May 1910 to join Southern League Southampton. At Southampton, heimmediately created a favourable impressi" in pre-season matches and scored on his debut in a 2–3 defeat at Luton Town on 3 September 1910, followed by a goal in a 3–0 victory over Portsmouth on 10 September.

He was "exceptionally quick off the mark" and a superb sprinter, who was able to use his speed "with admirable effect". By the end of the 1910–11 season he had scored nine league goals, making him joint top-scorer with Harry Brown, although his final tally could have been significantly higher had a foot injury not hampered his form towards the end of the season.

In the summer of 1911, he returned to his native Lancashire to join his Southampton teammate, John Johnston at Stalybridge Celtic.
