= Bill Smith (footballer, born 1887) =

English footballer (d. 1929)

Personal information
- Full name: William Smith
- Date of birth: 23 June 1887
- Place of birth: Denaby Main, England
- Date of death: 21 March 1929 (aged 41)
- Place of death: Leeds, England
- Height: 5 ft 10 in (1.78 m)
- Position: Centre-forward

Youth career
- Hickleton Main Colliery

Senior career*
Years	Team	Apps	(Gls)
1912–1913	Brentford	27	(12)
1913–1914	Southampton	20	(4)
1914–1915	Halifax Town		
- * Club domestic league appearances and goals

William Smith (23 June 1887 – 21 March 1929) was an English professional footballer who played as a centre-forward for various clubs in the years immediately prior to the First World War.

== Football career ==
Born in Denaby Main in the West Riding of Yorkshire, Smith played his early football for the nearby Hickleton Main Colliery before joining Brentford of the Southern League in October 1912. At Griffin Park, he soon gained a reputation as a prolific goal-scorer with 12 goals from 27 appearances.

In the 1913 close-season, he moved to the south coast to join Southampton and made his debut for the "Saints" in the opening match of the 1913–14 season. Despite "showing persistence and industry", he struggled to reproduce the form he had at Brentford. After scoring only four goals in his first fourteen appearances, he was replaced by Percy Prince. Smith was recalled for a further five matches in December/January without managing to score and lost his place again, this time to new signing Arthur Hollins.

In the summer of 1914, Smith returned to Yorkshire to join Halifax Town of the Midland League.
