= Fred Mouncher =

English footballer

Personal information
- Full name: Frederick William Mouncher
- Date of birth: 19 November 1883
- Place of birth: Southampton, England
- Date of death: 17 February 1918 (aged 34)
- Place of death: Fulham, England
- Position: Winger

Youth career
- Fitzhugh Rovers
- Southampton Cambridge

Senior career*
Years	Team	Apps	(Gls)
1903–1907	Southampton	99	(14)
1907–1911	Fulham	43	(10)
- * Club domestic league appearances and goals

Frederick William Mouncher (19 November 1883 – 17 February 1918) was an English professional footballer who played as a winger for Southampton and Fulham in the 1900s.

== Playing career ==
Mouncher was born in Southampton and played as an amateur with local sides Fitzhugh Rovers and Southampton Cambridge. He started his professional career in the summer of 1903 at The Dell where he teamed up with his former colleague at Fitzhugh Rovers, Fred Harrison. He made his debut for Southampton on 26 September 1903 at outside left, replacing Joe Turner for one match. In February, he started a longer run as replacement to the injured John Fraser, and played a total of ten games as the "Saints" took the Southern League title for the sixth (and last) time.

He joined Southampton's summer 1904 tour of South America, during which they played teams representing Argentina and Uruguay, winning 8–0 and 8–1 respectively. Mouncher, who was a "fast, direct forward", retained the left wing position for the start of the following season, but his lack of consistency led to him being dropped in favour of the veteran Harry Wood. He was recalled later in the season on the right, making a total of twenty appearances in 1904–05. For 1905–06 he featured more regularly, missing only two matches and contributing six goals, and at the end of the season he nearly joined Dundee who offered him "flattering terms"
