= George O'Brien (footballer, born 1935) =

Scottish footballer (1935–2020)

Personal information
- Full name: George O'Brien
- Date of birth: 22 November 1935
- Place of birth: Dunfermline, Scotland
- Date of death: 18 March 2020 (aged 84)
- Place of death: Southampton, England
- Position: Inside forward

Youth career
- –: Blairhall Colliery

Senior career*
Years	Team	Apps	(Gls)
1952–1957	Dunfermline Athletic	93	(25)
1957–1959	Leeds United	44	(6)
1959–1966	Southampton	244	(154)
1966	Leyton Orient	17	(3)
1966–1968	Aldershot	41	(8)
Total		439	(196)
- * Club domestic league appearances and goals

George O'Brien (22 November 1935 – 18 March 2020) was a Scottish footballer who played as an inside forward.

== Football career ==
He began his career with Blairhall Colliery before becoming a professional with Scottish Football League club Dunfermline Athletic in 1952. He spent five years with Dunfermline, scoring 25 league goals in 93 appearances. In 1957, he moved to England to play for Leeds United in the Football League. He was transferred to Southampton in 1959, having scored six times in 44 appearances during his time at Elland Road.

O'Brien spent six years at The Dell, scoring 154 league goals in 244 matches.he played 18 fa cup ties for the saints scoring 19 times He left Southampton in March 1966, spending a few months with Leyton Orient before moving on to Aldershot in December 1966, where he finished his playing career.

== Personal life ==
O'Brien died in Southampton on 18 March 2020 at the age of 84.
