= George Williams (footballer, born 1897) =

English footballer

Personal information
- Full name: George Henry Williams
- Date of birth: 10 October 1897
- Place of birth: Ventnor, England
- Date of death: 22 February 1957 (aged 59)
- Place of death: Southampton, England
- Height: 5 ft 7 in (1.70 m)
- Position: Inside forward

Youth career
- Peartree Congregational Church
- Hampshire Regiment
- 1919–1920: Southampton

Senior career*
Years	Team	Apps	(Gls)
1920–1921	Southampton	2	(1)
1921–1922	Exeter City	11	(1)
1922–1925	Netley Sports		
1925–1926	Cowes		
1926–19??	Salisbury City		
- * Club domestic league appearances and goals

George Henry William (10 October 1897 – 22 February 1957) was an English professional footballer who played as an inside forward for Southampton and Exeter City in the 1920s.

== Football career ==
Williams was born at Ventnor on the Isle of Wight; during the First World War he had been a member of the Hampshire Regiment, serving in the 2/4th Battalion.

After leaving the army, Williams joined Southampton as an amateur in 1919, signing as a professional in October 1920. He made his debut when he took the place of the injured Arthur Dominy for a Football League Division Three match at Swindon Town on 6 September 1920. Although Williams scored, the match ended in a 3–2 defeat. He retained his place for the next match, a 2–0 victory over local rivals, Portsmouth. Following Dominey's return to fitness, Williams was not given another opportunity in the first team and moved to Exeter City in the summer of 1921.

After one season with Exeter, in which he made eleven league appearances, Williams returned to Hampshire where he played Hampshire League football with Netley Sports and Cowes, before finishing his football career at Salisbury City.

== Later career ==
After retiring from football, Williams found employment as a painter and decorator.
