= George Jones (footballer, born 1889) =

English professional footballer

Personal information
- Full name: George Edwin Jones
- Date of birth: 12 December 1889
- Place of birth: Bolton, Lancashire, England
- Date of death: 1969 (aged 79)
- Place of death: Bury, Lancashire, England
- Height: 5 ft 10 in (1.78 m)
- Position: Centre-forward

Youth career
- Elston Rovers

Senior career*
| Years | Team | Apps | (Gls) |
| 1914–1915 | Crewe Alexandra | | |
| 1918–1919 | Bury | 0 | (0) |
| 1919–1920 | Southampton | 7 | (5) |
| 1920–19?? | Goole Town | | |
- * Club domestic league appearances and goals

George Edwin Jones (12 December 1889 – 1969) was an English professional footballer who played at centre-forward in the period either side of the First World War.

== Football career ==
Jones was born in Earlestown, near St Helens and started his football career at Crewe Alexandra of the Birmingham & District League in 1914. After the war, he spent a season with Bury in the Lancashire War League, before moving to the south coast in May 1919, to join Southern League Southampton.

At The Dell, Jones was an understudy to Bill Rawlings and his first-team opportunities were limited. He played in the opening match of the 1919–20 season, a 1–1 draw with Exeter City before Rawlings took over. After one appearance at inside-right in November 1919, his only run in the side came at the end of March when he replaced Rawlings for five matches at centre-forward. He scored in four of those matches, including two in an 8–1 victory over Merthyr Town on 10 April to bring his tally to a respectable five goals from seven appearances.

During his one season with the "Saints", Jones won representative honours when he scored twice for the South Eastern League XI against the London Combination.

In the 1920 close season, Jones joined Goole Town for their first season in the newly founded Yorkshire Football League.
