= Derek Reeves =

English footballer

Personal information
- Date of birth: 27 August 1934
- Place of birth: Poole, England
- Date of death: 22 May 1995 (aged 60)
- Place of death: Bournemouth, England
- Position: Centre forward

Senior career*
Years	Team	Apps	(Gls)
–	Bournemouth Gasworks Athletic		
1954–1962	Southampton	273	(145)
1962–1965	Bournemouth & Boscombe Athletic	35	(8)
1965–19??	Worcester City		
- * Club domestic league appearances and goals

Derek Reeves (27 August 1934 – 22 May 1995) was an English footballer, born in Poole, Dorset, who played as a centre forward for Southampton and Bournemouth & Boscombe Athletic in the Football League.

== Football career ==
Derek Reeves joined Southampton FC in December 1954 having been demobbed from National Service. He scored on his debut against his hometown club, Bournemouth & Boscombe Athletic. Reeves soon became the scourge of Third Division services. A quick, bustling player with explosive finishing he was able to capitalise on any half-chances inside the penalty area and his lack of height did not interfere with his heading capabilities. He was the first of a succession of Saints forwards to benefit from the services of those wing wonders, Paine and Sydenham.

Reeves finished as Saints' top scorer for four consecutive seasons, culminating in 1959-60 when his 39 League goals created not only a Saints' but Division Three record which remains to this day.

There are a couple of standout matches that highlighted Reeves' career. In January 1960, Saints took on top-flight Manchester City in the FA Cup third round and came away with an incredible 5–1 win – this regarded as Saints finest hour in the competition until 1976! Over 2,000 Saints fans travelled to Maine Road and Reeves, whose four goals underpinned the incredible scoreline dedicated his feat to those fans. He said, "I was determined to run myself into the ground just to thank them for their wonderful support."

In December of that year, Saints drew Leeds in the League Cup at The Dell. Due to two lengthy floodlight failures the match lasted an incredible 2 hours and 40 minutes. Injuries meant that the match became effectively nine against ten (Huxford in goal and no subs in those days). Saints led the match 4–0 with all four scored by Reeves. In the second half, Leeds threw everything at the home defence and with 10 minutes remaining drew level. But with virtually the last kick of the game, Reeves slotted the winner and for the fifth time in the game, Paine provided the assist!

Finding Second Division defences less generous; he struggled to maintain his prodigious scoring and in 1962 he moved to Bournemouth for a fee of £8,000. Surprisingly, he only managed eight goals in 35 games before moving on to non-league Worcester.

He was the cousin of former Norwich City and Manchester City striker Kevin Reeves.

Having moved back to his home town, Reeves died at the age of just 60 in 1995.
