= Arthur Andrews (footballer, born 1891) =

English footballer (1891-1964)

Personal information
- Full name: Alfred Andrews
- Date of birth: 1 April 1891
- Place of birth: Sunderland, England
- Date of death: 24 September 1964 (aged 73)
- Place of death: Southampton, England
- Position: Half back

Youth career
- Sunderland Rovers

Senior career*
Years	Team	Apps	(Gls)
1913–1914	Blackpool	0	(0)
1919–1920	Southampton	10	(0)
1920–1921	Harland & Wolff		
1921–1922	General Post Office		
1922–19??	Cowes		
- Lymington
- * Club domestic league appearances and goals

Alfred "Arthur" Andrews (1 April 1891 – 24 September 1964) was an English professional footballer who played as a half back for Southampton in their final season in the Southern League in 1919–20.

== Football career ==
Andrews was born in Sunderland where he worked in the local shipyard before joining Blackpool in November 1913. He failed to break into Blackpool's first-team before League football was interrupted by the First World War.

During the war, he moved to the south coast to work in the Southampton shipyard of Harland & Wolff, where he played in their works team in the South Hants War League. In 1918–19, Andrews played for Southampton in the South Hants War League and in the Victory Cup.

After the war, he joined Southampton as a professional player in August 1919, and made his first-team debut when he took the place of another former Harland & Wolff employee Bert Fenwick at right half for the home game against Southend United on 8 November 1919. The match ended in a 4–0 victory, with Bill Rawlings scoring a hat-trick. Andrews retained his place at right-half until the FA Cup replay at West Ham United on 15 January 1920, when he was attempting a rash challenge after 12 minutes, resulting in a broken leg. 20-year-old Bert Shelley replaced him for the next match and became a Saints' stalwart, making nearly 450 appearances over the next 12 years before becoming first-team trainer.

== Later career ==
Andrews was released by Southampton in May 1920 and returned to work in the shipyards. He played part-time football in the Hampshire League with Cowes and Lymington.
