= George Moorhead =

Northern Irish footballer (1895-1975)

Personal information
- Full name: George Henry Moorhead
- Date of birth: 27 May 1895
- Place of birth: Christchurch, New Zealand
- Date of death: 20 June 1975 (aged 80)
- Place of death: Lurgan, Northern Ireland
- Height: 5 ft 11 in (1.80 m)
- Position: Half back

Senior career*
Years	Team	Apps	(Gls)
1918–1920	Glenavon		
1920–1921	Southampton	9	(0)
1922	Brighton & Hove Albion	1	(0)
1922–1924	Linfield		
1924–1925	Glenavon		
1925–1930	Linfield		
1930–1931	Heart of Midlothian	0	(0)

International career
1923–1929	Ireland	3	(0)
1924–1928	Irish League	9	(0)
- * Club domestic league appearances and goals

George Henry Moorhead (27 May 1895 – 20 June 1975) was a Northern Irish international footballer who played as a centre half in the 1920s. Although born in New Zealand, Moorhead made three international appearances for Ireland. He played his club football with Southampton in England and with Linfield and Glenavon in Northern Ireland.

== Club career ==
Moorhead was born in Christchurch, New Zealand but moved to Ireland as a child. During the First World War, he enlisted in the Royal Irish Rifles, and played football for the regimental team. On the cessation of his military service, he played for Glenavon.

Moorhead joined Southampton in August 1920, at the start of their first season in Division Three of the Football League. He made his debut on 18 December 1920, when manager Jimmy McIntyre dropped Alec Campbell after two defeats against Grimsby Town. The match at Reading ended in a 4–0 victory and Moorhead retained his place for 13 matches, including four in the FA Cup. With his "talent for giving precise passes", Moorland seemed to be heading for a long career with the Saints, when he had his registration cancelled by the Football Association and was suspended for twelve months because of an "irregularity covering amateurs".

After serving his suspension, he joined Brighton & Hove Albion in August 1922, where he made one league appearance before moving back to Northern Ireland in December.

He then joined Linfield where he remained for nine years, interrupted by a spell back at Glenavon. At Linfield, he became "one of their all-time greats" and helped them win the Irish League and defeat Glentoran in the final of the Irish Cup in his first season. He was also on the losing side in the 1926 cup final but was left out, at his own request, of the side that defeated Ballymena United in 1930. In the 1926 final, he was closely marking Belfast Celtic's centre-forward Sammy Curran, thus preventing him from getting much time with the ball, when he was hit with a "fearful kick" from Curran's colleague, Jimmy Ferris. Moorhead spent much of the rest of the match trying to gain retribution against Ferris, allowing Curran to score three goals.

Described as "an extremely consistent performer", Moorhead rarely missed a match for Linfield and on match days he used to walk from his home at Lurgan to Windsor Park in Belfast (21 miles) – he referred to this as his "morning dander".

Moorhead wound up his career in Scotland with Heart of Midlothian for the 1930–31 season.

== International career ==
Moorhead made his international debut for Ireland on 3 March 1923, in a 1–0 British Home Championship defeat to Scotland. He then had to wait five years before his next international appearance, in an unofficial friendly against France on 21 February 1928, followed four days later by a British Home Championship match against Scotland, this time ending 1–0 to the Irish. In this match, Moorhead was described as being "most conspicuous for cleverness and consistency".

Moorhead's fourth and final cap came a year later, also against Scotland; Scotland won comfortably 7–3, with four goals from Hughie Gallacher.

Moorhead also made nine appearances for the Irish League between 1924 and 1928.

=== International appearances ===
Moorhead made three appearances for Ireland in official international matches, as follows:

Date	Venue	Opponent	Result	Goals	Competition
3 March 1923	Windsor Park, Belfast	Scotland	0–1	0	British Home Championship
25 February 1928	Firhill Park, Glasgow	Scotland	1–0	0	British Home Championship
23 February 1929	Windsor Park, Belfast	Scotland	3–7	0	British Home Championship

Win	Draw	Loss

== Honours ==
Linfield

- Irish League champions: 1922–23, 1929–30
- Irish Cup winners: 1923
- Irish Cup finalists: 1926
