= Dan Gordon (Scottish footballer) =

Scottish footballer (1881–1958)

Personal information
- Full name: Daniel Gordon
- Date of birth: 7 January 1881
- Place of birth: West Calder, Scotland
- Date of death: 1958 (aged 77)
- Height: 5 ft 10 in (1.78 m)
- Position: Full-back

Senior career*
Years	Team	Apps	(Gls)
19??–1903	Broxburn		
1903–1904	Everton	0	(0)
1904–1905	Southampton	6	(0)
1905–1907	Falkirk	56	(0)
1907–1908	St Mirren	25	(0)
1908	Middlesbrough	1	(0)
1908–1910	Bradford (Park Avenue)	50	(0)
1910–1911	Hull City	11	(0)
1911–1912	Southampton	12	(0)
- * Club domestic league appearances and goals

Daniel Gordon (7 January 1881 – 1958) was a Scottish professional footballer who played as a full-back for various clubs in the early years of the 20th century.

== Football career ==
Gordon was born in West Calder (then in Midlothian) and started his professional career with local side Broxburn before moving to England in April 1903 to join Everton.

Gordon was unable to break into Everton's first-team and, after a year of reserve team football, he moved to the south coast in the 1904 close season to join Southern League champions, Southampton.

At The Dell, Gordon was understudy to England international George Molyneux. Described as "a capable fullback with the physique of a blacksmith", he had a "deceptive burst of speed" which helped the Saints reserves win the Hampshire Senior Cup in 1905. In the first team, Gordon made only six Southern League appearances, each time as replacement for Molyneux at left-back.

In the summer of 1905, Gordon returned to his native Scotland to join Falkirk for two seasons, then St Mirren where he remained for a further year (playing in the 1908 Scottish Cup Final) before signing for Middlesbrough of the English Football League Second Division in May 1908. After six months and one appearance for Middlesbrough, he then joined fellow Second Division club, Bradford (Park Avenue) where he remained for two years making 50 league appearances. By the end of the 1909–10 season, he had joined another Second Division club, Hull City, for whom he made only eleven appearances before returning to Southampton in the summer of 1911.

Back at The Dell, Gordon added some valuable experience to a struggling side, generally acting as cover for Jack Eastham. After a further twelve League appearances, Gordon retired in 1912, returning to Scotland to live.
