= Bill Buckenham =

English footballer

Personal information
- Full name: William Elijah Buckenham
- Date of birth: 3 February 1888
- Place of birth: Exeter, England
- Date of death: 9 June 1954 (aged 66)
- Place of death: Plumstead, England
- Height: 6 ft 0 in (1.83 m)
- Position: Centre forward

Youth career
- Plumstead Park Villa
- Plumstead Melrose
- Farnham
- 86th Battalion Royal Artillery, Aldershot

Senior career*
Years	Team	Apps	(Gls)
1909–1910	Woolwich Arsenal	21	(5)
1909–1910	Southampton	6	(2)
1910–????	12th Royal Field Artillery		
- * Club domestic league appearances and goals

William Elijah Buckenham (3 February 1888 – 9 June 1954) was an English amateur footballer who played for both Woolwich Arsenal and Southampton in 1909–10.

== Football career ==
Buckenham was born in Exeter but was brought up in the Plumstead area of London where he played for local clubs, before joining the Royal Artillery based at Aldershot in Hampshire, where he gained Hampshire county honours. He joined Woolwich Arsenal of the Football League First Division in November 1909 and made 21 league appearances, scoring five goals.

Shortly after joining Arsenal, he also signed for Southampton of the Southern League, and thus was registered for both clubs at the same time. He made his debut for the "Saints" taking the place of Bob Carter on 30 April 1910 in the final match of the season, when he scored in a 3–1 victory against Reading. He started the following season, playing at outside right, scoring again in the opening match of the season. After four more appearances, he was replaced by Frank Jefferis; shortly afterwards, he decided to abandon football and concentrate on a career in the army.
