= Andrew Gibson (footballer) =

Scottish footballer (1890-1962)

Personal information
- Full name: Andrew Gibson
- Date of birth: 1 July 1890
- Place of birth: Camlachie, Glasgow, Scotland
- Date of death: 20 June 1962 (aged 71)
- Place of death: Stratford, Ontario, Canada
- Position: Inside forward

Youth career
- Kelvinhaugh

Senior career*
Years	Team	Apps	(Gls)
- Strathclyde
1911–1912	Southampton	18	(4)
1912	Celtic	2	(1)
1912–1913	Leeds City	5	(0)
- * Club domestic league appearances and goals

Andrew Gibson (1 July 1890 – 20 June 1962) was a Scottish professional footballer who played as an inside forward in the 1910s.

== Playing career ==
Born in Glasgow he was playing for Strathclyde and was attracting the attention of both Celtic and Rangers when he was signed in May 1911 by Southern League Southampton, along with teammate Jim McAlpine. Southampton's new manager George Swift claimed that Gibson was "the best forward he had seen and would be a thousand pounds man". Swift was Southampton's first appointment as manager and promptly embarked on a spending spree, signing eleven players in six weeks.

He made his debut on 2 September 1911 at home to Millwall. Despite scoring twice in a 3–2 victory over Leyton on 28 October he failed to live up to Swift's high expectations. In March 1912 Gibson was suspended (along with Henry Hamilton) for a serious breach of club discipline, as a result of which he was placed on the transfer list. He never appeared for the first team again and, after two trial matches for Celtic, he joined Leeds City in September 1912.

At Leeds he made a handful of appearances in the Second Division before retiring.
