= George Wilcock =

Scottish footballer (1890–1962)

Personal information
- Full name: George Harrie Wilcock
- Date of birth: 24 January 1890
- Place of birth: Edinburgh, Scotland
- Date of death: 1962 (aged 71–72)
- Place of death: Sheffield, England
- Height: 5 ft 9 in (1.75 m)
- Position: Goalkeeper

Senior career*
Years	Team	Apps	(Gls)
1909–1910	Bradford Park Avenue		
1910–1912	Barnsley	4	(0)
1912–1913	Goole Town		
1913–1919	Brighton & Hove Albion	11	(0)
1919–1920	Southampton	20	(0)
1920–1921	Preston North End	7	(0)
1921–19??	Caerphilly		
- * Club domestic league appearances and goals

George Harrie Wilcock (24 January 1890 – 1962) was a Scottish footballer who played as a goalkeeper for various clubs either side of the First World War.

== Football career ==
Wilcock was born in Edinburgh, Scotland and from school he joined the Royal Field Artillery. He left the Army in 1909 to start his footballing career, initially with Bradford Park Avenue before joining Barnsley of the Football League Second Division in January 1910.

Wilcock remained with Barnsley for two years, but made only four first-team appearances, as cover for regular goalkeeper, Jack Cooper. In 1912, he moved to Goole Town of the Midland League for a season, followed by a move to the south coast to join Brighton & Hove Albion of the Southern League in 1913.

Following the outbreak of World War I, Wilcock rejoined his original military unit, the Royal Field Artillery and was seriously injured at the Battle of Loos in September 1915. As a result of his injuries, he was invalided back to England, becoming a trainer with the Army. Once he returned to fitness, he represented the Army at football and was playing in a match against the Royal Navy at Plymouth which was being watched by directors of Southampton Football Club.

He was signed by Southampton in readiness for the resumption of professional football in 1919 and made his debut at Bristol Rovers on 13 December 1919, replacing Arthur Wood, retaining his place in goal for the remainder of the season. He soon "proved to be a very able custodian" and the "Saints" were approached by several of the country's top teams – although Southampton were reluctant to release him, Wilcock was sold to Preston North End of the First Division in May 1920.

At Deepdale, Wilcock was used as cover for regular goalkeeper, Arthur Causer, and made only seven appearances before dropping out of professional football.

After a spell with Caerphilly, he returned to Southampton to take up employment in the docks.

Wilcock died in Sheffield in 1962.
