= Cliff Huxford =

English footballer (1937–2018)

Personal information
- Full name: Clifford George Huxford
- Date of birth: 8 June 1937
- Place of birth: Stroud, Gloucestershire, England
- Date of death: 3 August 2018 (aged 81)
- Position: Wing half

Youth career
- 1953–1955: Chelsea

Senior career*
Years	Team	Apps	(Gls)
1955–1959	Chelsea	6	(0)
1959–1967	Southampton	278	(4)
1967–1968	Exeter City	41	(1)
–	Worcester City		

Managerial career
- 1972: Aldershot (caretaker manager)
- ?–2001: Brockenhurst
- * Club domestic league appearances and goals

Clifford George Huxford (8 June 1937 – 3 August 2018) was an English footballer who played as a wing half in the Football League for Chelsea, Southampton and Exeter City.

== Football career ==
Huxford began his career as a junior with Chelsea, and made his Football League debut for the club in the 1958–59 season, before moving to Southampton in part-exchange for Charlie Livesey. He spent eight seasons with Southampton, during which he played 320 games in all competitions, scoring 4 goals. In 1967, he moved on to Exeter City for a season, playing a further 41 games and scoring once. He went on to play for clubs including Worcester City of the Southern League, after which he had a long career as coach or manager with numerous clubs in non-League football.
