= Henry Hamilton (footballer) =

English footballer (1887–1938)

Personal information
- Full name: Henry Gilhespy Hamilton
- Date of birth: 1887
- Place of birth: South Shields, England
- Date of death: 1938 (aged 50–51)
- Position: Centre forward

Youth career
- Craghead United

Senior career*
Years	Team	Apps	(Gls)
1908–1910	Sheffield Wednesday	7	(0)
1910–1911	Huddersfield Town	16	(10)
1911–1912	Southampton	23	(9)
1912–1913	Belfast Celtic		
1913–1914	South Shields		
- * Club domestic league appearances and goals

Henry Gilhespy Hamilton (1887–1938) was an English professional footballer who played as a centre forward for various clubs in the 1900s and 1910s.

== Playing career ==
He was born in South Shields and started his professional career in December 1908 with Sheffield Wednesday before moving to Huddersfield Town in April 1910. At Huddersfield he scored ten goals in sixteen league games, plus three in four FA Cup matches; this prolific form attracted the attention of Southern League Southampton's new manager George Swift. Swift was Southampton's first appointment as manager and promptly embarked on a spending spree, signing eleven players in six weeks.

Hamilton was immediately drafted into the first team as centre-forward, making his debut on 2 September 1911 at home to Millwall. He found the net fairly regularly during his one season at The Dell, scoring nine goals in 23 league appearances, thus becoming top-scorer for the 1911–12 season. He had problems settling in the south, however, and in March 1912 was suspended (along with Andrew Gibson) for a ꞌserious breach of club disciplineꞌ, as a result of which he was placed on the transfer list. Following his departure Saints tried several players at centre forward including Cecil Christmas and Leonard Dawe before finally settling on Percy Prince.

He moved to Belfast to join Belfast Celtic where he spent a year before returning to his native north east where he played out his career with South Shields. After World War I he played no more professional football.
