= Jim McAlpine =

Scottish footballer (1887-1948)

Personal information
- Full name: James Montgomery McAlpine
- Date of birth: 28 June 1887
- Place of birth: Dalziel, Lanarkshire, Scotland
- Date of death: October qtr. 1948 (aged 61)
- Place of death: Southampton, England
- Height: 5 ft 7 in (1.70 m)
- Position: Left half

Youth career
- Strathclyde

Senior career*
Years	Team	Apps	(Gls)
1907–1908	Craigneuk Heatherbell		
1908–1909	Dalziel Rovers		
1909–1910	Vale of Clyde		
1910–1911	Strathclyde		
1911–1919	Southampton	132	(2)
1915	→ Kilmarnock (guest)	3	(0)
1916	→ Wishaw Thistle (guest)		
1919–1921	Millwall	17	(0)
1921–1923	Gillingham	50	(0)
- * Club domestic league appearances and goals

James Montgomery McAlpine (28 June 1887 – October qtr. 1948) was a Scottish footballer, who played as a half back for Southampton in the Southern League before playing for Football League clubs Millwall and Gillingham.

== Football career ==
Born in Dalziel, (Motherwell, Lanarkshire), McAlpine played for various local clubs, including Strathclyde where he was spotted by scouts from Southampton. Along with teammate Andrew Gibson, he signed for the Saints in May 1911 and was considered to be one of new manager George Swift's better signings. Swift was Southampton's first appointment as manager and promptly embarked on a spending spree, signing eleven players in six weeks.

Playing alongside the ever-dependable Bert Lee, he became a virtual ever-present up to the suspension of football in 1915. According to Holley & Chalk's "The Alphabet of the Saints", McAlpine was "rather small for a left half, (but) made up for his lack of stature with a determined and forceful temperament that made him a firm favourite with the Saints crowd."

During World War I he remained on Saints' books, but joined local shipbuilders Harland & Wolff and turned out for their works football team, often against the Saints. He briefly returned to his native Scotland, playing for Kilmarnock and Wishaw Thistle.

After the war he moved to Millwall where he was part of their first ever Football League side in 1920–21. In July 1921 he moved on to Gillingham for a couple of seasons before retiring.
