= Arthur Wood (footballer, born 1894) =

English footballer

Personal information
- Full name: Arthur Wood
- Date of birth: 14 January 1894
- Place of birth: Walsall, England
- Date of death: 8 April 1941 (aged 47)
- Place of death: Portsmouth, England
- Height: 5 ft 10 in (1.78 m)
- Position: Goalkeeper

Youth career
- 1914: Southampton

Senior career*
Years	Team	Apps	(Gls)
1914–1921	Southampton	43	(0)
1921–1931	Clapton Orient	373	(0)
1931–19??	Ryde Sports		
- Newport (IOW)
- * Club domestic league appearances and goals

Arthur Wood (14 January 1894 – 8 April 1941) was an English goalkeeper who played for Southampton and Clapton Orient. He was the son of the England international forward, Harry Wood.

== Career ==
Wood was born at Walsall, where his father was living whilst playing for Wolverhampton Wanderers. His father's career took him to Southampton in 1898 where he remained until he retired. According to "The Alphabet of the Saints", "he had been taken to the Dell to watch his father but had been inspired by the exploits of two great Southampton 'keepers, Clawley and Robinson". Arthur Wood was given a trial in April 1913 and was taken on to the staff at The Dell.

=== Southampton ===
He made his first-team debut in the Southern League on 9 September 1914 in a 3–2 defeat at Luton, replacing Ernie Steventon. He retained his place for six matches before Steventon returned in October, followed by a longer spell from December to March. By the end of the 1914–15 season he had made 19 appearances, exactly half the league matches played, as well as playing in all four matches in the FA Cup.

During the First World War, Wood enlisted in the Royal Engineers, but his military duties allowed him to turn out for Southampton in the various War Leagues. On the resumption of League football in 1919, Wood started as the first-choice keeper, and played in the opening 18 matches, before he was replaced by George Wilcock. Wilcock left Southampton at the end of the season and was replaced as first-choice 'keeper for Southampton's first season in the Football League by Tommy Allen. Wood only made two Football League appearances for the "Saints" before moving to Clapton Orient in May 1921.

== Clapton Orient ==
At Clapton, playing in the Football League Second Division, Wood soon became first-choice goalkeeper and missed only a handful of matches in the next eight seasons, being ever-present for each of the seasons from 1922–23 to 1925–26. From 1925–26 onwards, Clapton struggled in the league, finishing one place above the relegation zone for three consecutive seasons, before they were relegated to the Third Division South in 1929.

By now, age was catching up with Wood and his appearances over the next two years were less regular until he retired in the summer of 1931. In his ten years at Clapton Orient, he "became something of an institution" with nearly 400 appearances in all competitions.

== Later career ==
Wood then returned to the south coast and made occasional appearances for Isle of Wight teams, Ryde Sports and Newport (IOW). He died at Portsmouth in April 1941, aged 47.
