= Arthur Hollins (footballer) =

English footballer

Personal information
- Place of birth: Wolverhampton, England
- Height: 5 ft 10 in (1.78 m)
- Position: Centre-forward

Youth career
- Wolverhampton Early Closers

Senior career*
Years	Team	Apps	(Gls)
	Walsall	0	(0)
19??–1914	Wellington Town		
1914–1915	Southampton	18	(10)
- * Club domestic league appearances and goals

Arthur Hollins was an English professional footballer who played at centre-forward for Southampton between 1914 and 1915.

== Football career ==
Hollins was born in Wolverhampton and started his professional career at Walsall, without breaking into the first-team.

He then joined Wellington Town of the Birmingham & District League; by 1914 he was attracting the attention of bigger clubs, including Wolverhampton Wanderers of the Football League Second Division but instead chose to move to the south coast to join Southampton of the Southern League.

He joined the "Saints" in February 1914 and went straight into the first-team, taking the place of Bill Smith against Queens Park Rangers on 28 February. He retained the No. 9 shirt for the remaining eleven matches of the season, scoring seven times including both goals in a 2–0 victory over Norwich City on 4 April, followed by a hat-trick at Millwall six days later on Good Friday.

He continued at centre-forward for the first three matches of the 1914–15 season, scoring twice, before injuries caused him to miss most of the rest of the season, making only four further appearances.

His football career was ended by the start of the First World War and he is believed to have joined the Royal Navy.
