= Hamstead Colliery =

Coordinates: 52.53188°N 1.93336°W

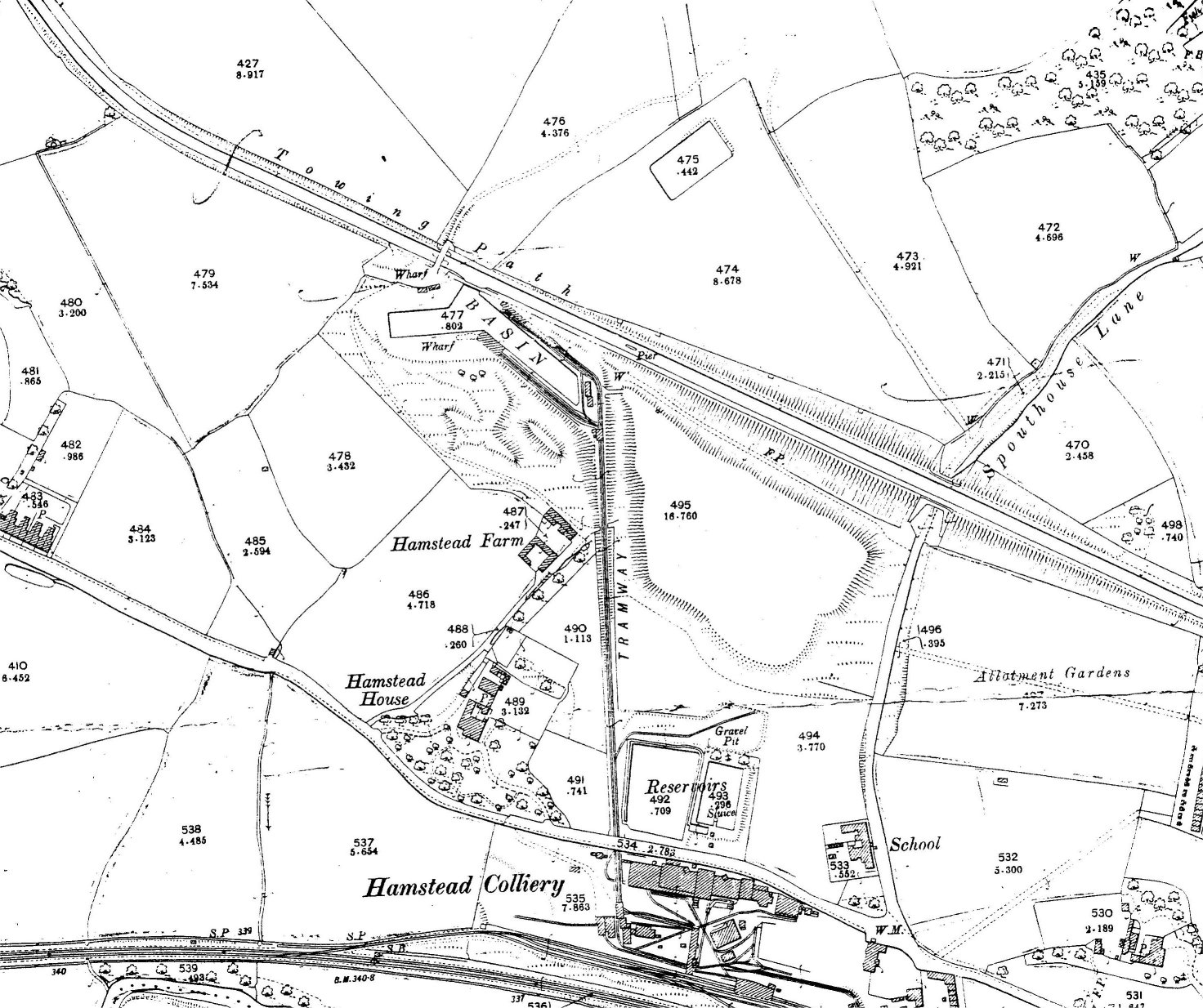
1901 Ordnance Survey map of the pithead area

Hamstead Colliery in Hamstead (then Staffordshire, now West Midlands), England, produced coal between 1878 and 1965, by mining the South Staffordshire 'Thick' coal seam. It suffered a major fire in 1908 in which 26 men died. It underwent modernisation following nationalisation in 1947, and again in the early 1960s.

== History ==
The Hamstead Colliery Company was formed in April 1875. It acquired land in an area of Perry Barr, Staffordshire, on what is now the north west border of Birmingham, from G.C. Calthorpe of nearby Perry Hall, and in 1876 sank shafts.

The first coal was not extracted until after 1878 due to unexpected geological problems and water ingress.

When opened, the mine was the deepest in the world. The coal was at a very deep level of almost 2000 feet. The experience gained by the mining engineers was put to good use in the English mining industry and their expertise was so world renown that the American Government requested assistance from the engineers that had solved many of Hamstead's problems, to establish deep coal mining there.

In 1894, the area became part of Perry Barr Urban District.

In 1923, the mine's annual output was stated by the Colliery Year Book and Coal Trades Directory as being 165,000 tons. In 1933, it was given by the same source as 260,000 tons.

In 1928, due to boundary changes, the mine head area became part of West Bromwich. Shortly afterwards, the mine was acquired by the Hamstead Colliery (1930) Ltd.

=== 1898 Fire ===
The mine closed in 1898 due to a fire in the workings, throwing 800 men out of work. With the Midlands facing an acute coal shortage it reopened on 8 January 1900.

=== 1905 Collapse ===
A collapse of coal late on 25 October 1905 trapped two miners. They were released without injury by a rescue party the following day.

=== 1908 Disaster ===
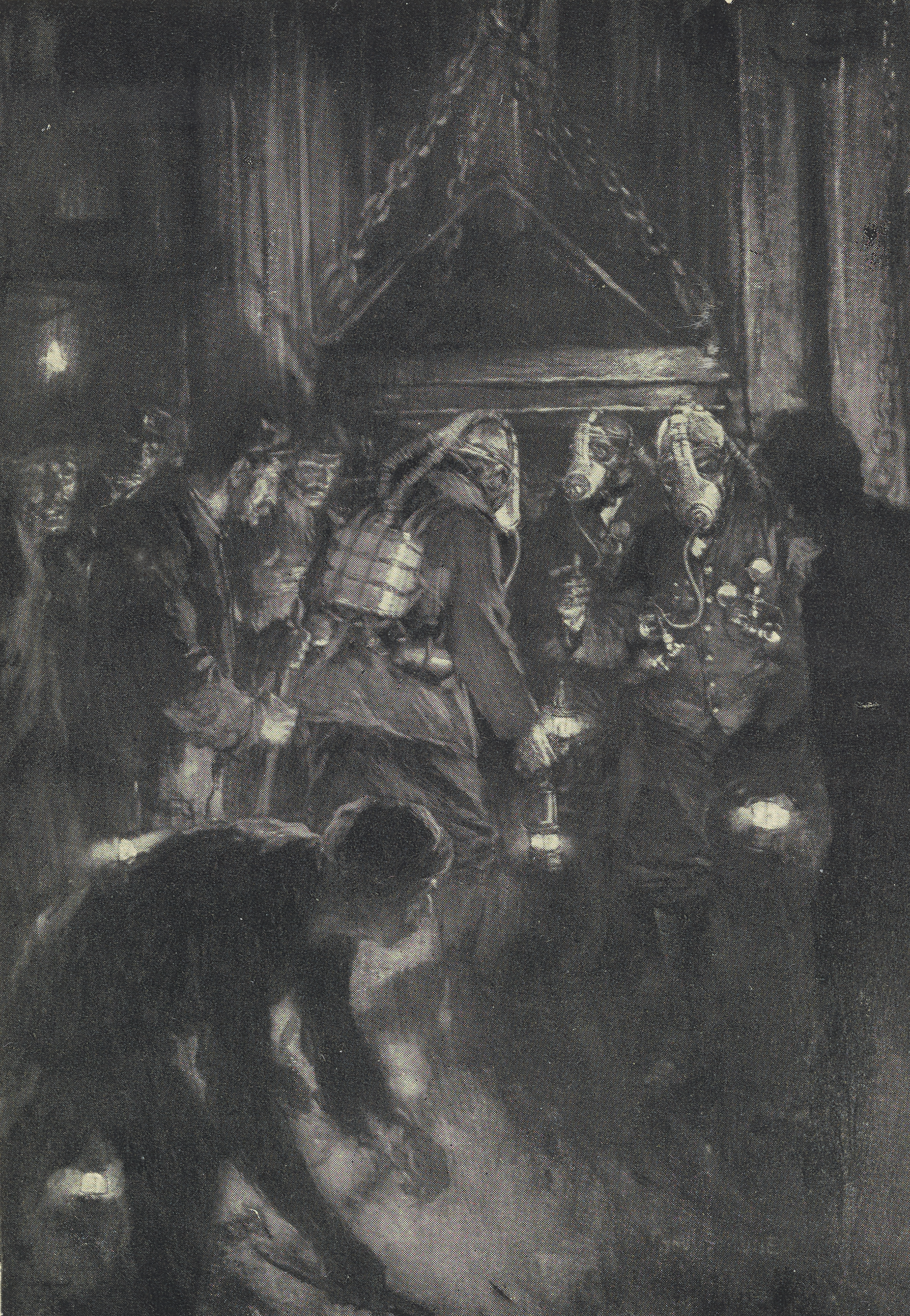
Rescue party with artificial respirating apparatus preparing to descend at Hamstead Colliery

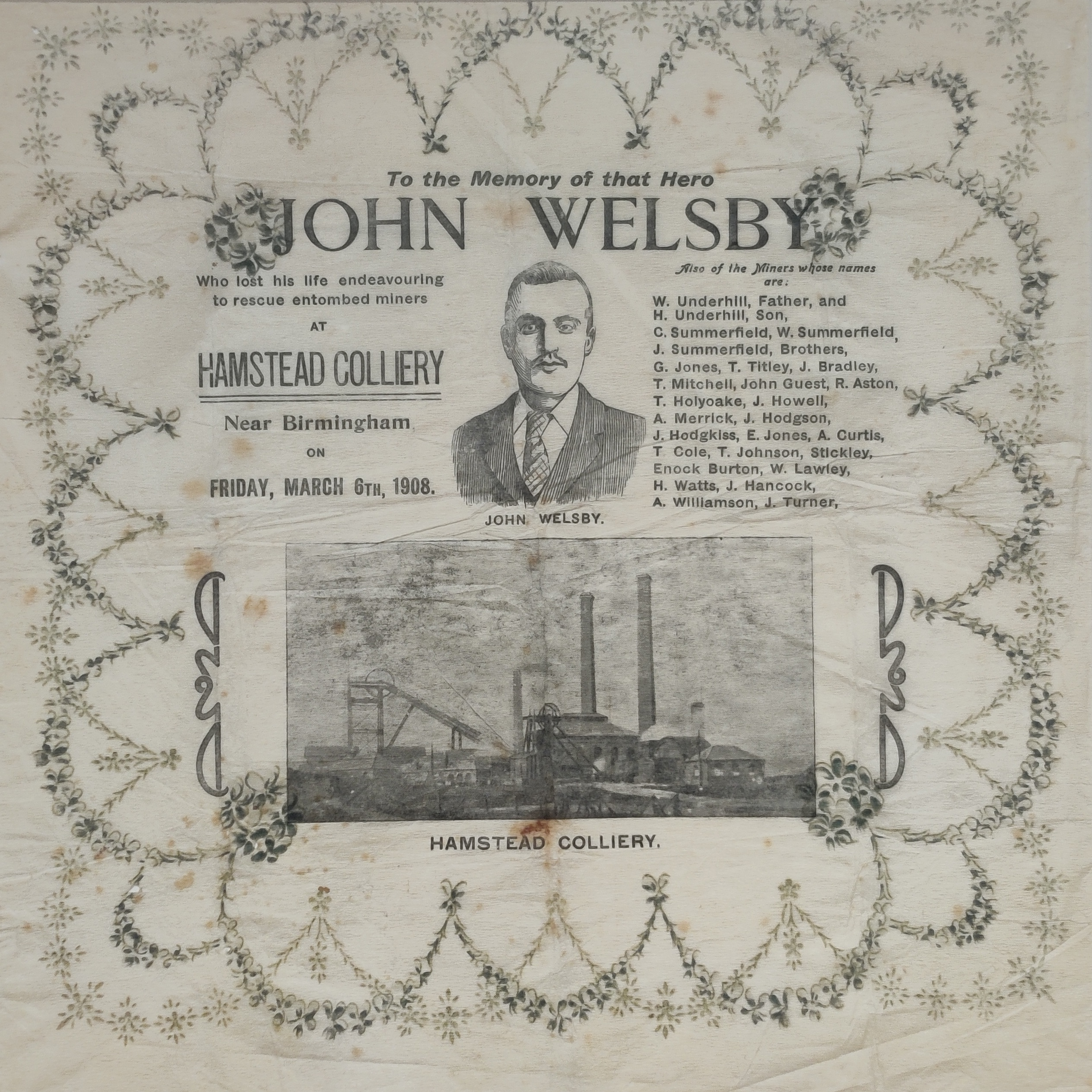
Handkerchief or napkin commemorating John Welsby and the other victims.

The disaster of 4 March 1908 was a national tragedy with 26 men—including a father and son—killed in one day. When the fire broke out there were 31 miners in the pit, 6 escaped before poisonous fumes built up in the roadways. Rescue teams from Hamstead, as well as from Tankersley and Altofts, both in Yorkshire, made many attempts to reach the entombed men. It took a week after the fire for the mine to clear of the fumes. On 11 March, 14 bodies were recovered, and 6 more were recovered the following day. A further victim was a member of the rescue team from Altofts, John Welsby, who died the next day after being overcome by heat. Welsby was posthumously awarded the Edward Medal (second class) and five other rescuer workers were awarded the Edward Medal (first class), while another received the second class medal. Welsby's grave at St Mary Magdalene, Altofts, is marked with large monument paid for by his fellow miners at Pope and Perasons Colliery.

A memorial was created at Hamstead village in 2008 and there is a small museum display at the local library in the Tanhouse Centre, Great Barr.

=== 1947 Nationalisation ===
The colliery, like all those in the UK, was nationalised on 1 January 1947, placing the colliery under the management of the National Coal Board. The known coal was by then mostly worked out, and the following year, five boreholes were sunk north of the pithead, identifying the location of further parts of the coal seam, bring the known reserves back up to 20 million long tons (20 million tonnes).

=== 1960s Modernisation ===
From around 1960, the colliery was modernised. Steam winding engines were replaced by electric engines, and five Lancashire boilers were scrapped. The pithead baths were expanded, and a medical centre added. Average weekly output rose from 3,000 long tons to 4,000 (approx 208,000 tons annually), with peaks of 5,000. 700 men were employed, with a target of an additional 300, to allow annual output of 360,000 tons. The use of explosives to break up the seam was largely superseded by compressed air at up to 12,000 pounds per square inch (83,000 kPa).

The main underground road between the coalface and the bottom of the mine shaft was widened and had its height raised from 4 feet (1.2 m) to as much as 10 feet (3.0 m), supported by steel girders and allowing miners to walk upright. There were then 4 miles (6.4 km) of roads underground. Cable-hauled coal tubs, holding 11 long cwt (1,200 lb or 600 kg), were replaced by a continuous conveyor belt, up to 36 inches (0.91 m) wide. Storage for up to 50 tons of coal was provided near the foot of the shaft, so that mining did not have to stop when the winding engines were not working.

At the time, the colliery was expected to be worked into the next century.

=== 1965 Closure ===
Hamstead continued to produce coal until 1965 when the mine closed as "uneconomic". 664 miners were put out of work.

== Features ==
=== Railways ===
The colliery had its own network of railway sidings, connected to the former Grand Junction Railway just north of Hamstead station.

A tramway connected the pithead to a basin (since filled in) on the nearby Tame Valley Canal, and to Hamstead Hill Wharf, on the hill above the colliery.

=== Brickworks ===
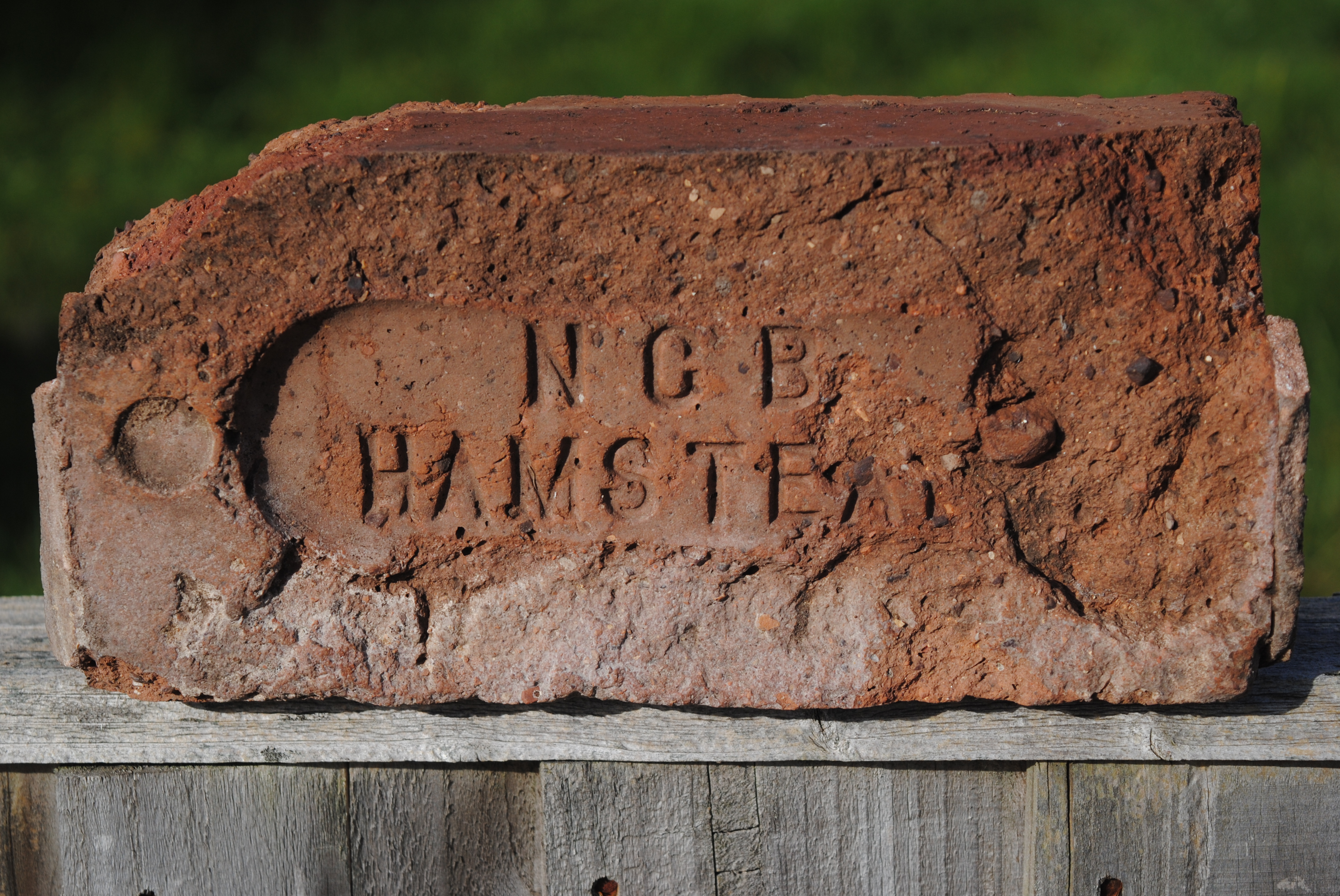
Brick stamped "NCB Hamstead"

A brickworks was operated next to the colliery, on the opposite side of Old Walsall Road and so (from 1929) just inside Birmingham, making bricks using clay dug out in the process of making new mine tunnels.

== Legacy ==
Housing was subsequently built on the site of the pithead. The pithead baths building, which had opened in 1937, was redeveloped as a nightclub, Kings. It has since been demolished, and as of 2025, its site is occupied by a petrol station.

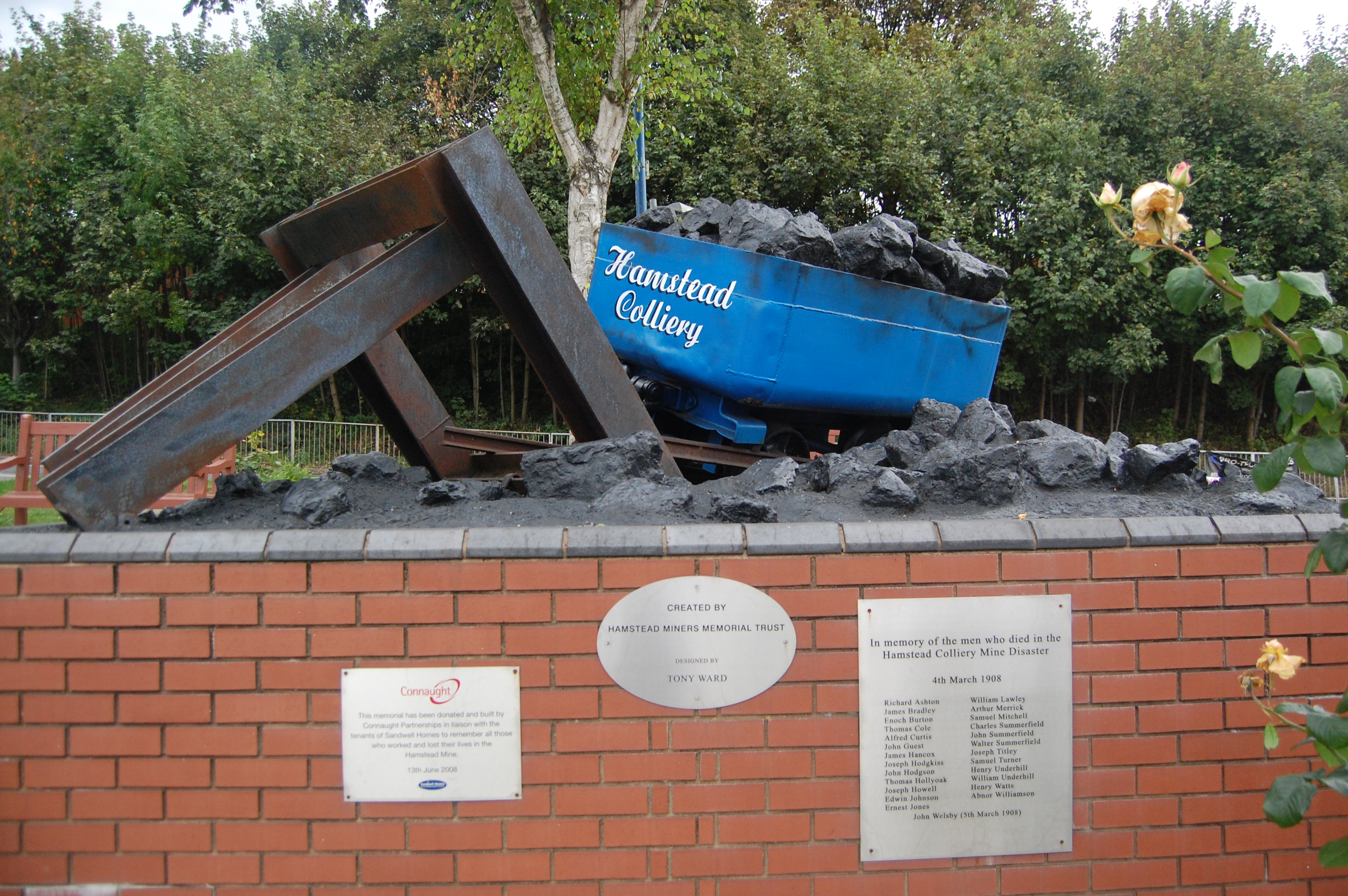
The memorial in September 2014

The Hamstead Miners Memorial Trust, a registered charity (number 1098711) exists to record and commemorate the mine and those who worked there. The trust erected, and maintains, a memorial on the junction of Hamstead Road and Old Walsall Road, near the former pithead. Erected in 2008, on the centenary of the disaster, it comprises a derailed tramway wagon full of coal, with a buffer-stop, and commemorative plaques.
