= Fred Harrison (footballer, born 1880) =

English footballer (1880-1969)

Personal information
- Full name: Frederick Harrison
- Date of birth: 2 July 1880
- Place of birth: Winchester, England
- Date of death: 21 November 1969 (aged 89)
- Place of death: Swaythling, Southampton, England
- Height: 5 ft 10 in (1.78 m)
- Position: Centre forward

Youth career
- Fitzhugh Rovers
- Bitterne Guild

Senior career*
| Years | Team | Apps | (Gls) |
| 1900–1907 | Southampton | 153 | (83) |
| 1907–1911 | Fulham | 120 | (47) |
| 1911–1913 | West Ham United | 54 | (19) |
| 1913–1914 | Bristol City | 15 | (5) |
- * Club domestic league appearances and goals

Frederick Harrison (2 July 1880 – 21 November 1969) was an English professional footballer who played as a forward for various clubs in the 1900s and 1910s.

== Playing career ==
=== Southampton ===
Born in Winchester, he started his career with local sides Fitzhugh Rovers and Bitterne Guild in Southampton often playing in matches on Southampton Common where he was spotted by Joe Turner who recommended him to the Southampton directors as a "fast goal-getter with a deadly shot".

He made his debut for the "Saints" in the penultimate match of the 1900–01 Southern League championship season and during the summer he accompanied the team on their first foreign tour of Belgium, Austria and Hungary which was a great success with 44 goals scored (for 3 against) in six matches. During the following season, Harrison gradually established himself in the team on the left wing, making 15 league appearances with five goals, generally replacing Joe Turner.

Injury prevented him starting the following season and he only became a fixture in the side in mid-January. Moving to centre-forward he quickly found his form scoring five goals in consecutive home matches against Wellingborough Town on 7 March 1903 (5–0) and Northampton Town on 21 March (7–0). Despite making only thirteen appearances he finished the season as top scorer with 17 goals, as Southampton again claimed the Southern League championship.

He now became the first choice centre-forward and in the 1903–04 season he was again top scorer with 27 goals from 32 league appearances with Southampton taking the championship title for the sixth (and final) time in eight seasons . He scored hat-tricks in a 5–1 victory over Northampton Town on 7 December and in a 6–1 defeat of Bristol Rovers on 12 March 1904. As a result of his goal-scoring prowess in the Southern League he was given an international trial by England (which was unsuccessful as he was played in an unfamiliar position) and was by now being chased by several leading clubs in the north.

In the following season Harrison suffered from illness and as a result struggled to find the form which had made him such a success in the previous season. He regained some of his form in the following two seasons in both of which he was again top scorer with twelve goals.

By now Southampton were beginning to struggle both on the pitch and financially and in November 1907, along with Fred Mouncher, he was sold to Fulham for a combined fee of £1,000. In his seven years with Southampton he made 166 appearances, scoring 88 goals, and was the club's top goal-scorer in 1902–03 (17 goals), 1903–04 (27 goals), 1905–06 (14 goals, jointly with Harry Brown) and 1906–07 (12 goals).

=== Fulham ===
He was never able to quite repeat his scoring feats at his later clubs although he did score five goals in one match for Fulham. In 1908 he helped Fulham reach the FA Cup Semi-finals, with six goals in six cup appearances, including both Fulham goals in a 2–1 in quarter final victory over League leaders Manchester United. However, in the semi-final against Newcastle United at Anfield Fulham were overwhelmed 6–0.

He was Fulham's top scorer in both the 1908–09 and 1909–10 seasons with 13 and 14 league goals respectively. In his four seasons with Fulham he made a total of 132 appearances with 54 goals. Despite this his efforts were not sufficient to earn Fulham promotion to Division One.

=== West Ham United ===
In April 1911 he moved back to the Southern League with West Ham United, making his debut on Good Friday, 14 April 1911, scoring in a 4–1 victory over his former club, Southampton. He also scored the only goal in the return match three days later.

In the 1911–12 season, he scored 13 goals, partly making up for the loss of George Webb in December for the rest of the season. He formed a great partnership with Danny Shea and together they scored 40 goals in that season. In the FA Cup, Harrison was part of the West Ham team that defeated Middlesbrough of the First Division in the Second Round in February 1912. Harrison scored West Ham's goal in the first match (drawn 1–1) and, despite carrying an injury from the first match, he scored the winner in the replay.

George Hilsdon replaced him in the front-line and in the 1912–13 season, Harrison was switched to play at centre half where he played several games, including a notable FA Cup tie against Aston Villa in February 1913. In his two years with the "Hammers" he made 62 appearances, scoring 23 goals.

== Honours ==
Southampton

- Southern League championship: 1902–03, 1903–04
