= List of Southampton F.C. players =

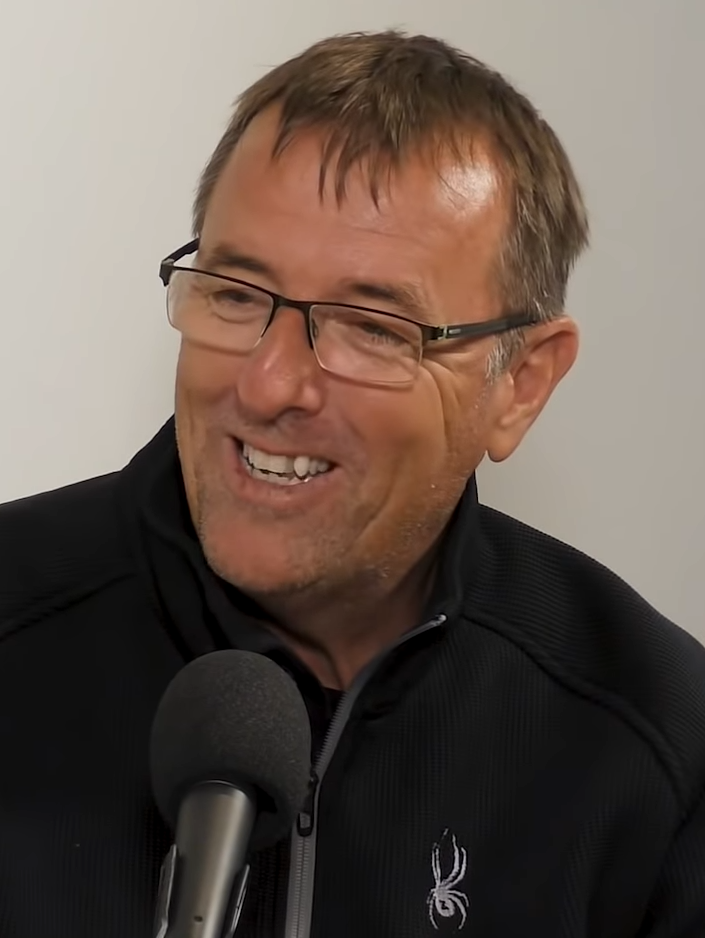
Matt Le Tissier is the second-highest all-time goalscorer and fourth-highest appearance-maker for Southampton.

Southampton Football Club is an English association football club based in Southampton, Hampshire. Founded in 1885 as St Mary's YMA, they became a professional club in 1891 and co-founded the Southern Football League in 1894. Southampton won the Southern League Premier Division championship six times between 1896 and 1904, and were later elected to the Football League Third Division in 1920. The Saints finished as runners-up in their first Football League season, and the following year received promotion to the Second Division as Third Division South champions. The club first entered the First Division in 1966, and currently play in its modern-day counterpart, the Premier League. Southampton won the FA Cup in 1976, reached the final of the League Cup in 1979 and 2017, and won the League Trophy in 2010.

Since the club's formation, a total of 224 players have made 100 or more appearances for Southampton. Winger Terry Paine holds the record for the highest number of appearances for the Saints, having played 816 times for the club between 1957 and 1974, while eleven other players have made more than 400 appearances for Southampton. The club's top goalscorer is Mick Channon, who scored 228 goals in all competitions in two spells with the club, between 1966 and 1977, and from 1979 to 1982. Matt Le Tissier is the only player to have won the Southampton F.C. Player of the Season award three times, while six other players (Peter Shilton, Tim Flowers, James Beattie, Rickie Lambert, José Fonte and James Ward-Prowse) have received the accolade twice. Le Tissier is also the only player besides Channon to have scored over 200 goals for Southampton.

== Key ==
- The list is ordered first by date of debut, and then if necessary in alphabetical order by surname.
- Appearances as a substitute are included. This feature of the game was introduced in the Football League at the start of the 1965–66 season.
- Statistics are correct up to and including the match played on 21 November 2026. Where a player left the club permanently after this date, his statistics are updated to his date of leaving.

Positions key
| Pre-1960s | | 1960s– | |
|---|---|---|---|
| GK | Goalkeeper | | |
| FB | Full back | DF | Defender |
| HB | Half back | MF | Midfielder |
| FW | Forward | | |

Nationality
Unless otherwise noted, the nationality of a player is determined by the country for which he has played, or if he has not played international football, his country of birth.
Position
Playing positions are listed according to the tactical formations that were employed at the time. The change in the names of defensive and midfield positions reflects the tactical evolution that occurred from the 1960s onwards.
Club career
Club career is defined as the first and last calendar years in which the player appeared for the club in any of the competitions listed below.
Total appearances and Total goals
Total appearances and goals comprise those in the Southern League, Wessex League, Football League, Premier League, Southern Alliance, Southern District Combination, United League, FA Cup, League/EFL Cup, FA Charity/Community Shield, League/EFL Trophy, Inter-Cities Fairs Cup, UEFA Europa League/UEFA Cup, UEFA Cup Winners' Cup, Southern Floodlit Cup, Southern Charity Cup, Texaco Cup, Full Members Cup, Hampshire Senior Cup, Hampshire Junior Cup, Hampshire Benevolent Cup, Hampshire County Cricket Club Charity Cup, Portsmouth Cup, Rowland Hospital Cup and Victory Cup. Wartime competitions are excluded.

== Players ==
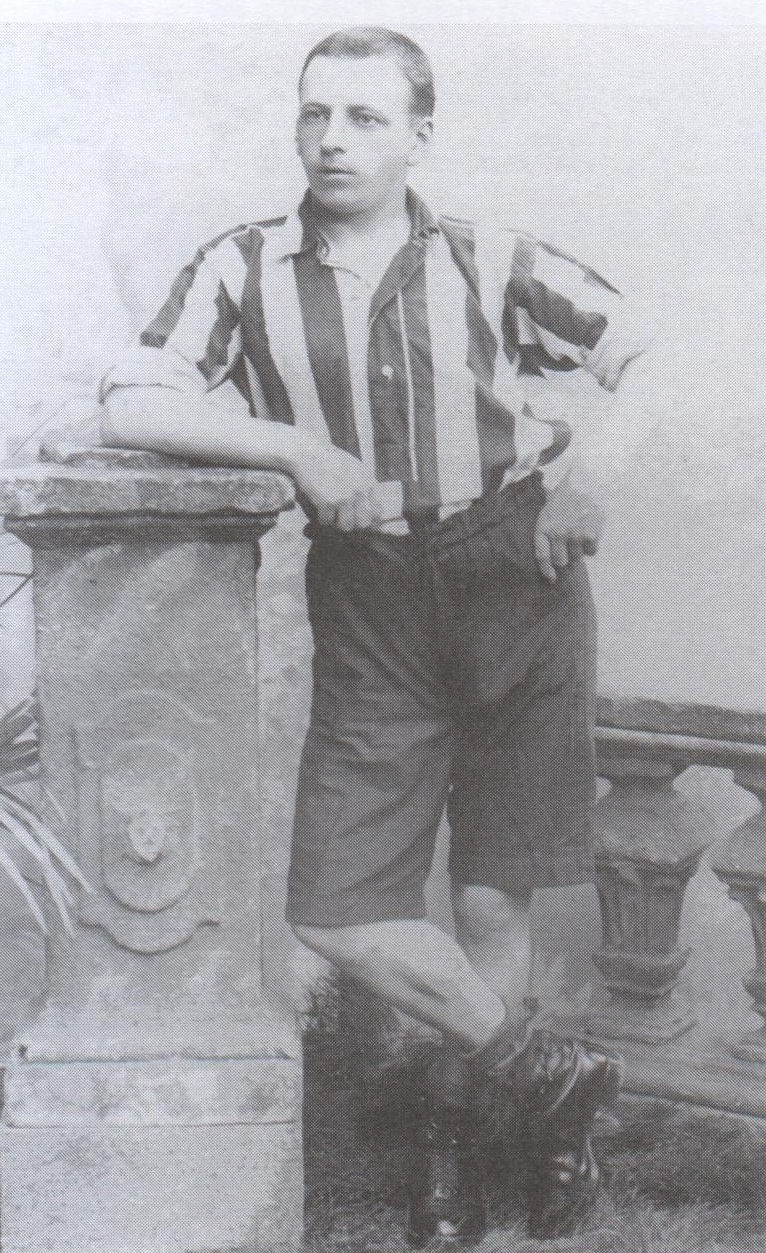
Watty Keay scored 34 goals for Southampton, including the first at The Dell, in 1898.

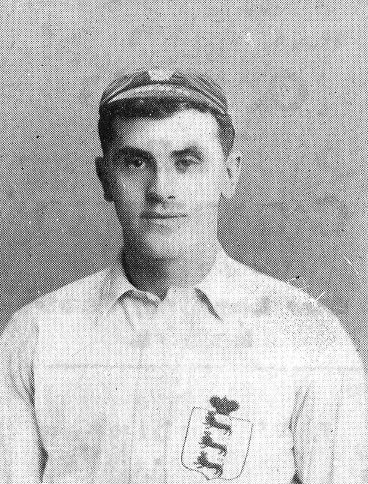
Jack Robinson played 201 times for Southampton, including in the 1900 FA Cup Final.

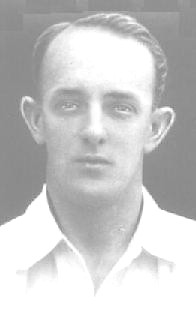
Frank Jefferis made over 220 appearances for the Saints.

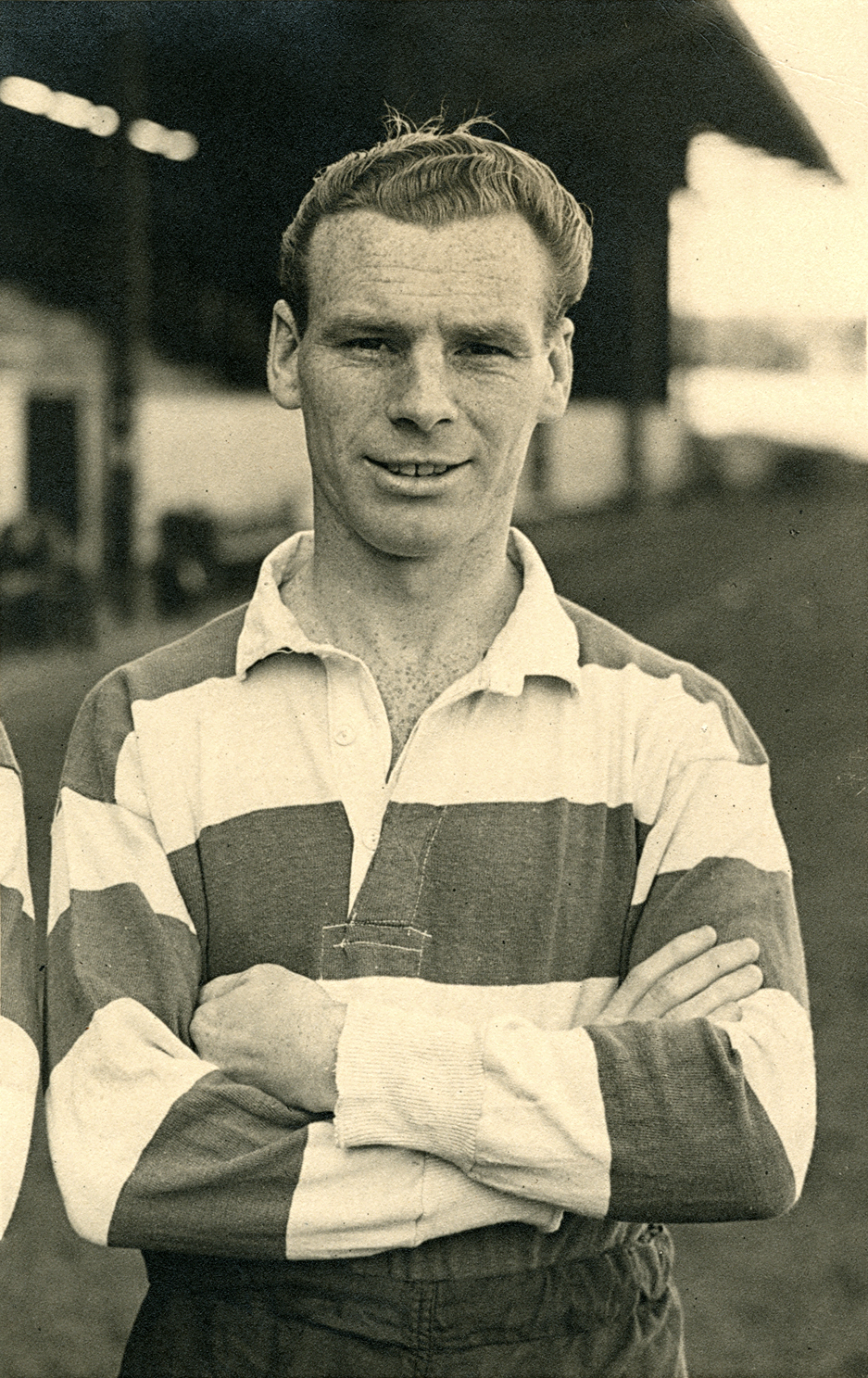
Joe Mallett played for the club 223 times.

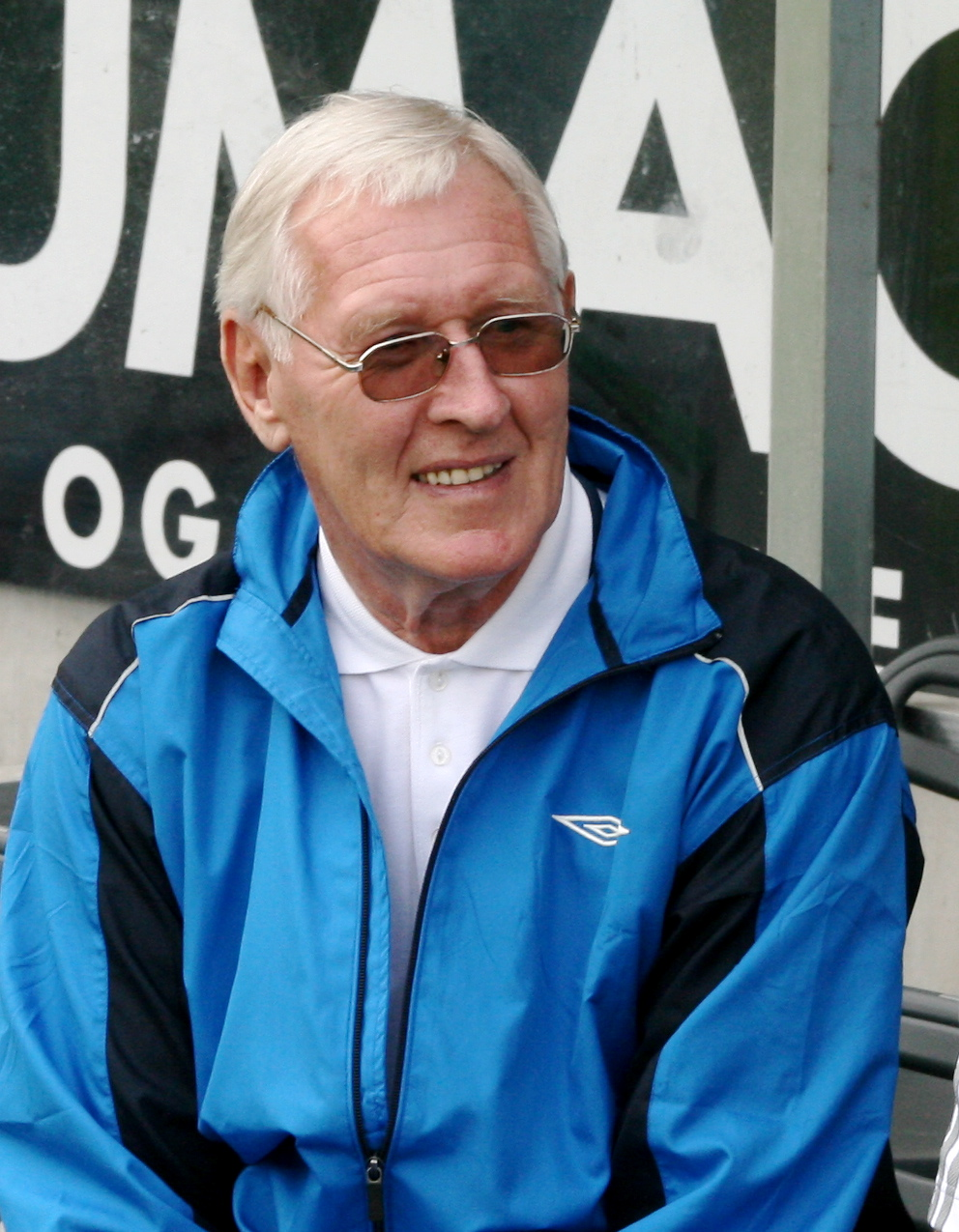
Tony Knapp played 260 games for Southampton.

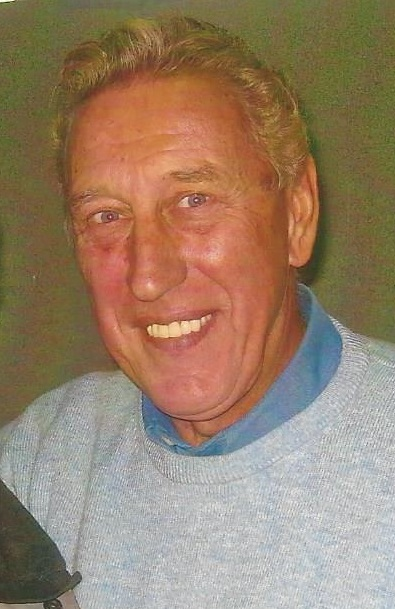
Martin Chivers scored over 100 goals for the club.

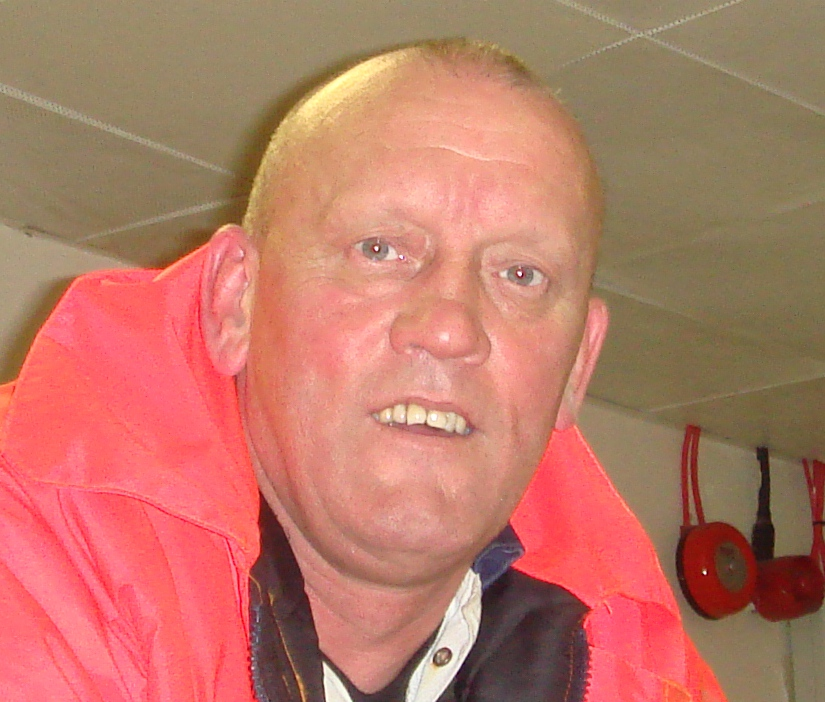
Ian Turner played in the 1976 FA Cup Final for Southampton.

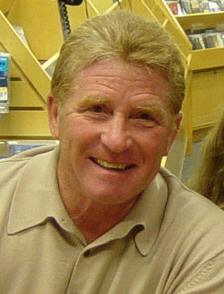
Alan Ball managed the club after two spells as a player.

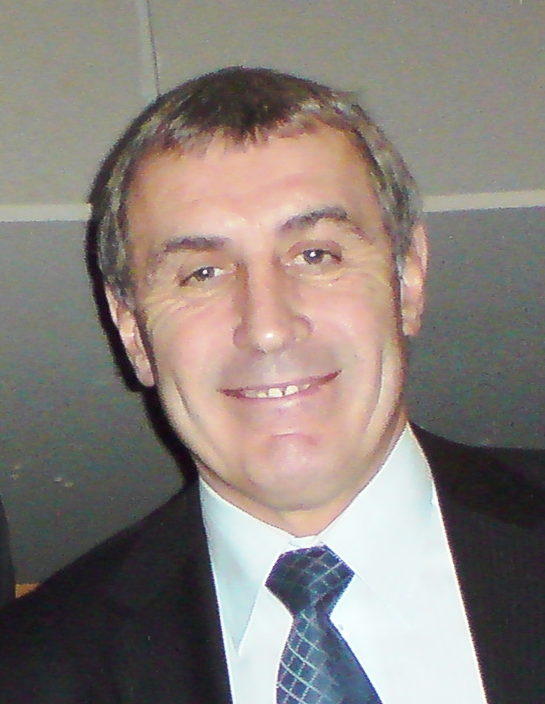
Goalkeeper Peter Shilton was the first player to win the Southampton F.C. Player of the Season award twice.

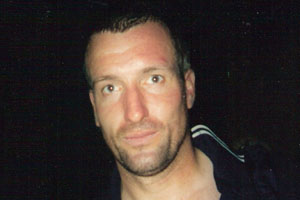
Tim Flowers was named Southampton F.C. Player of the Season in 1992 and 1993.

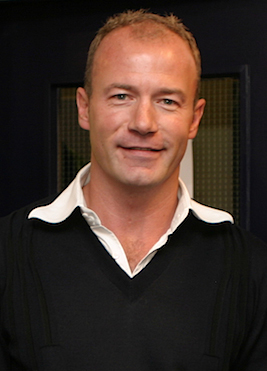
Alan Shearer made over 150 appearances for Southampton.

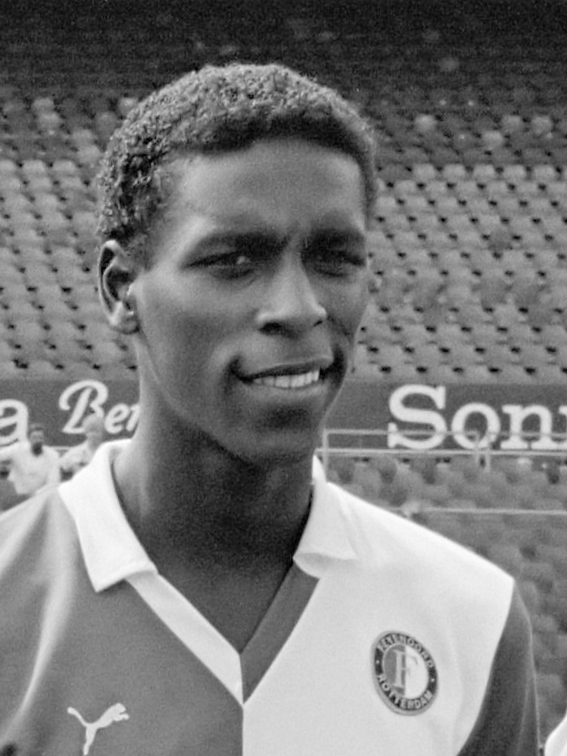
Ken Monkou played 233 games for the club.

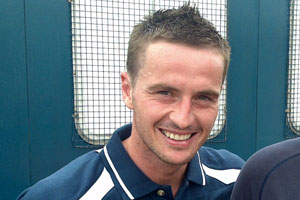
Matt Oakley played over 300 times for Southampton.

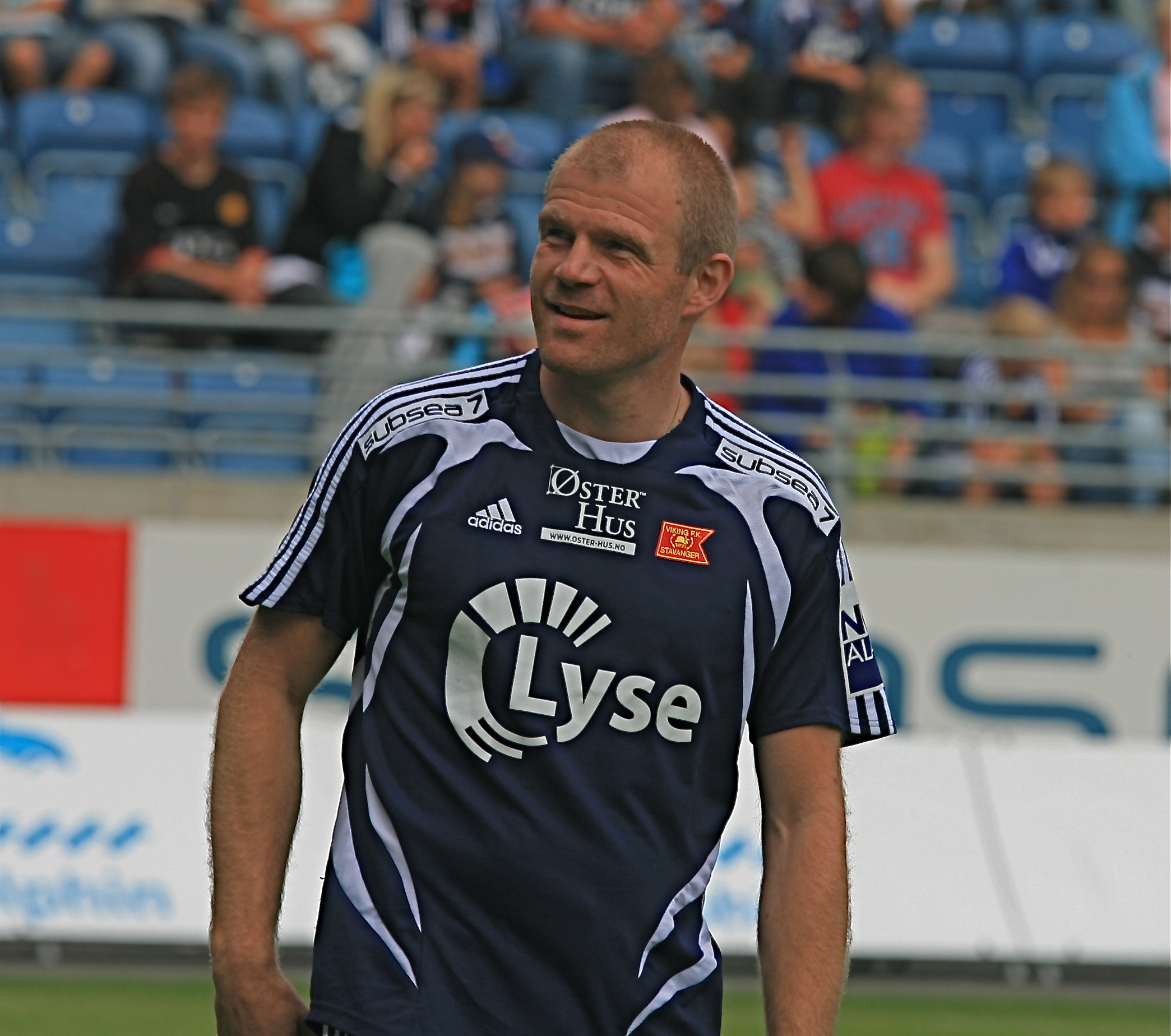
Egil Østenstad scored 33 goals in 109 appearances.

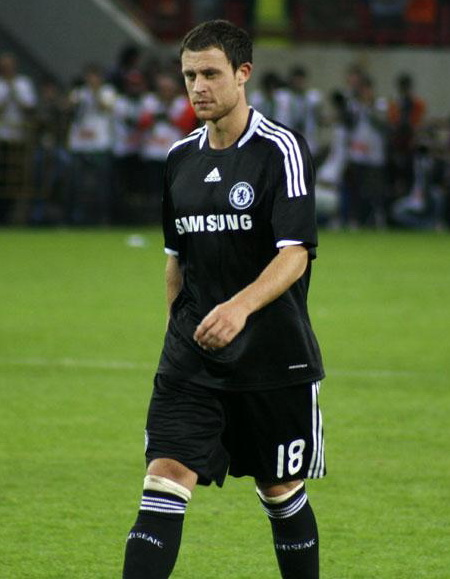
Wayne Bridge won the Southampton Player of the Season award in 2001.

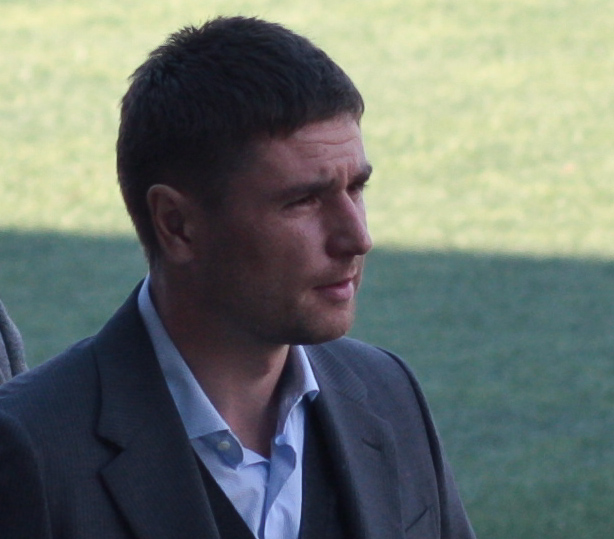
Marians Pahars scored 45 goals for the Saints.

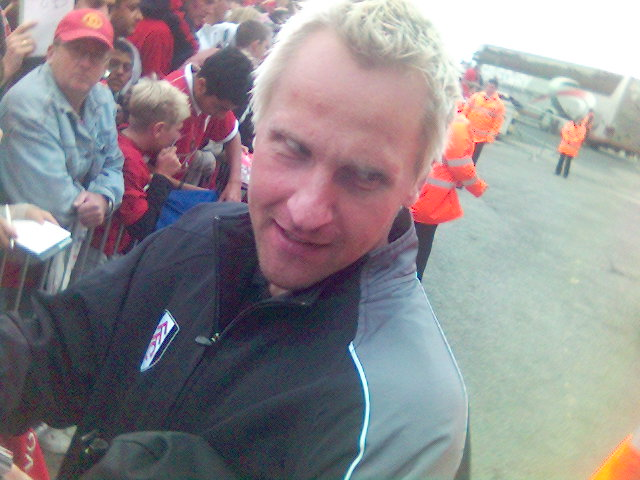
Antti Niemi made 123 appearances for the club.

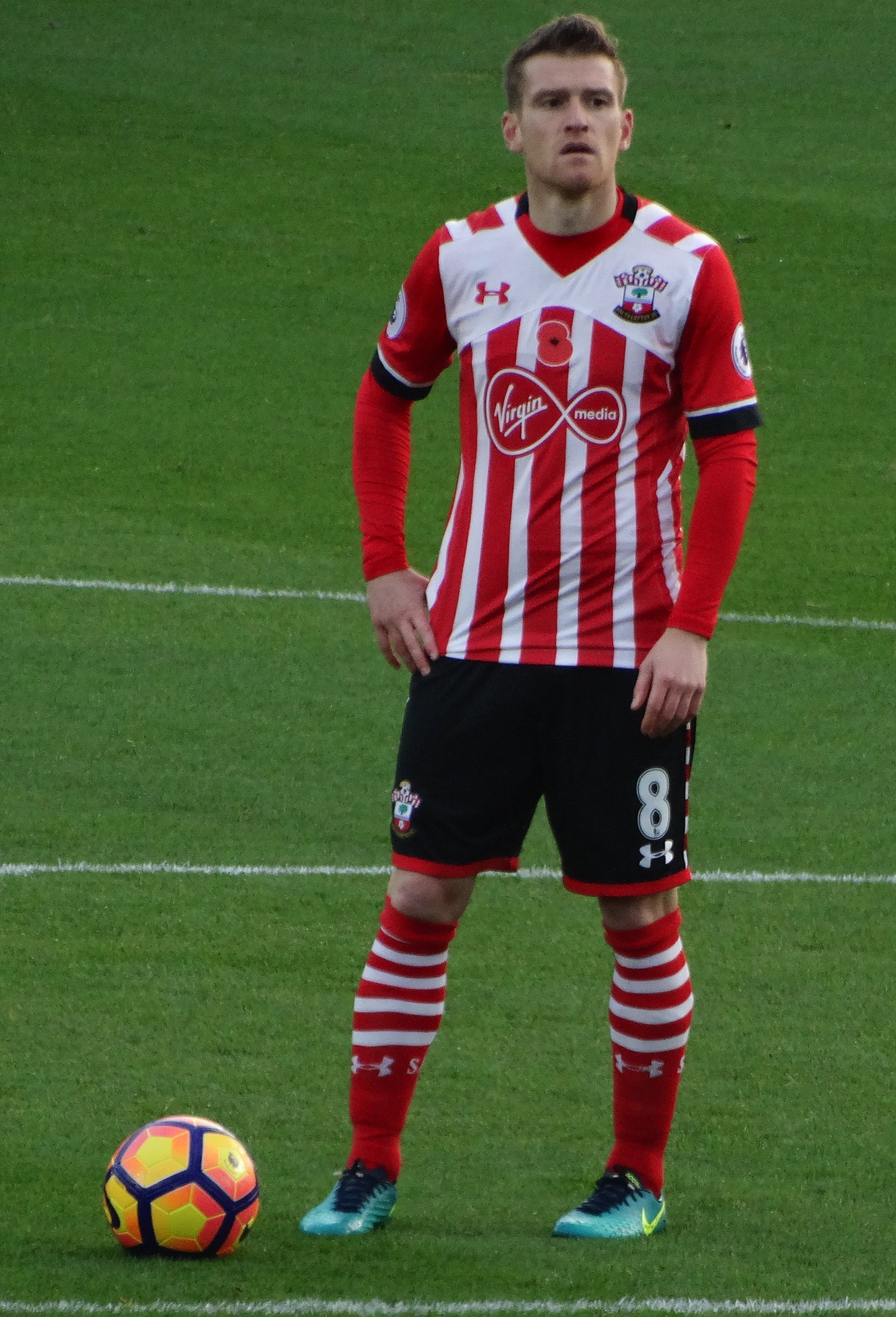
Steven Davis was a former club captain of the Saints.

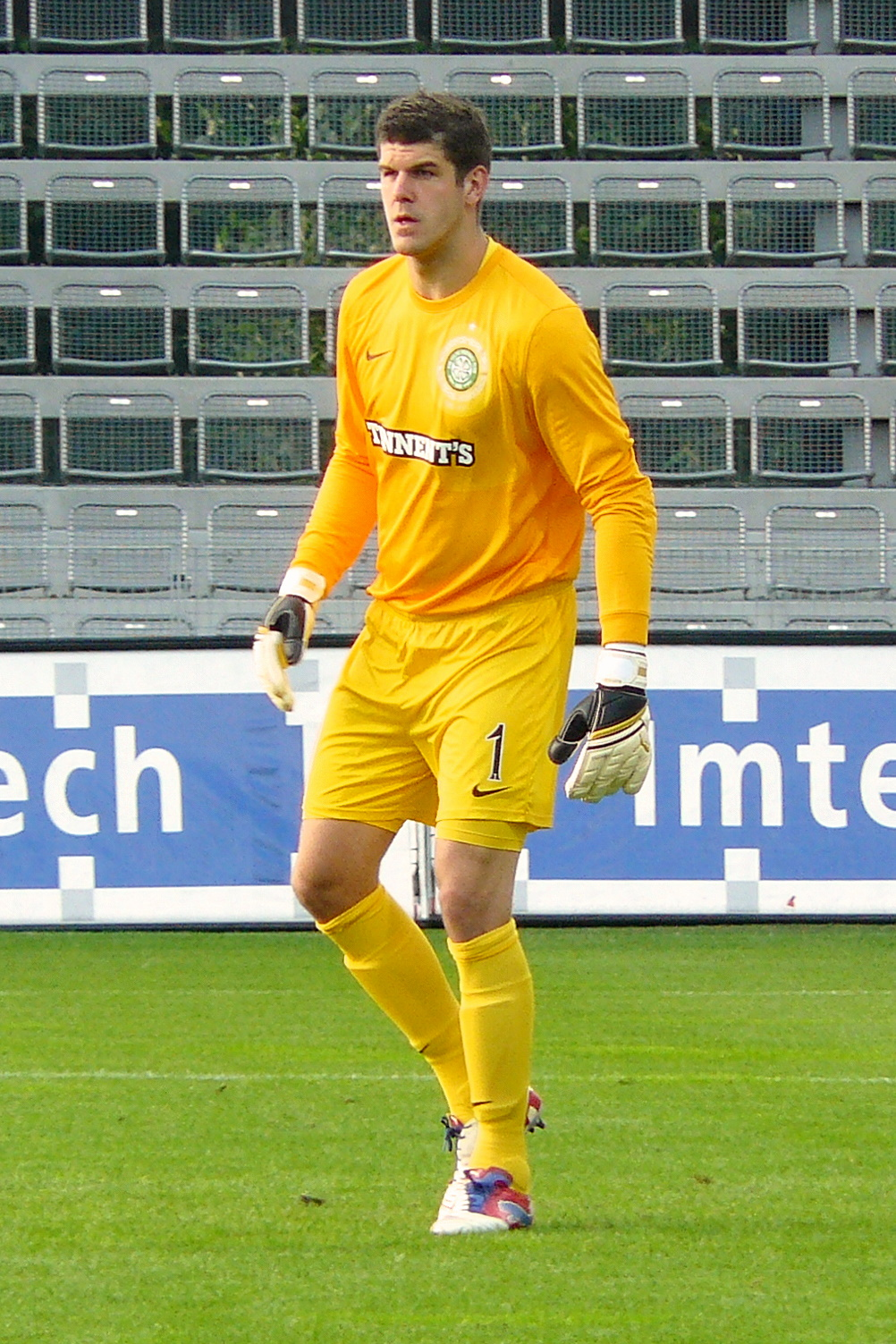
Fraser Forster attended the 2014 Fifa World Cup with England.

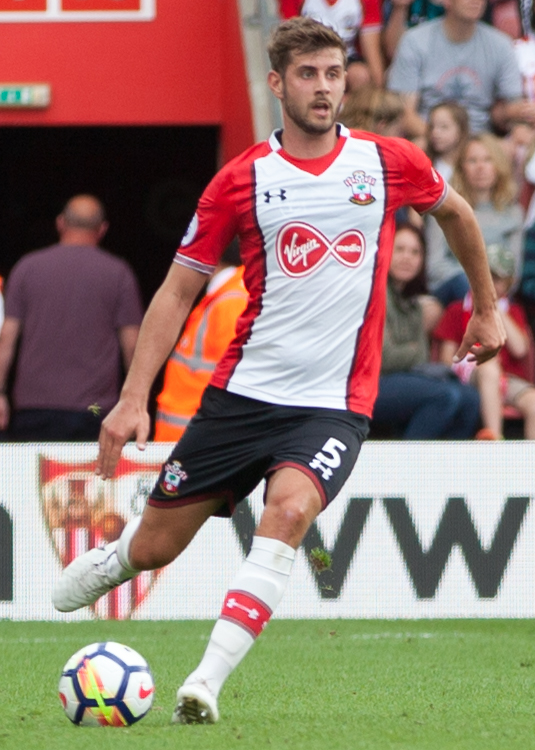
Jack Stephens joined Southampton from Plymouth Argyle in 2011.

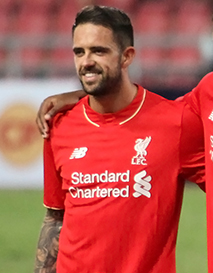
Danny Ings made exactly 100 appearances for Southampton, scoring 46 goals.

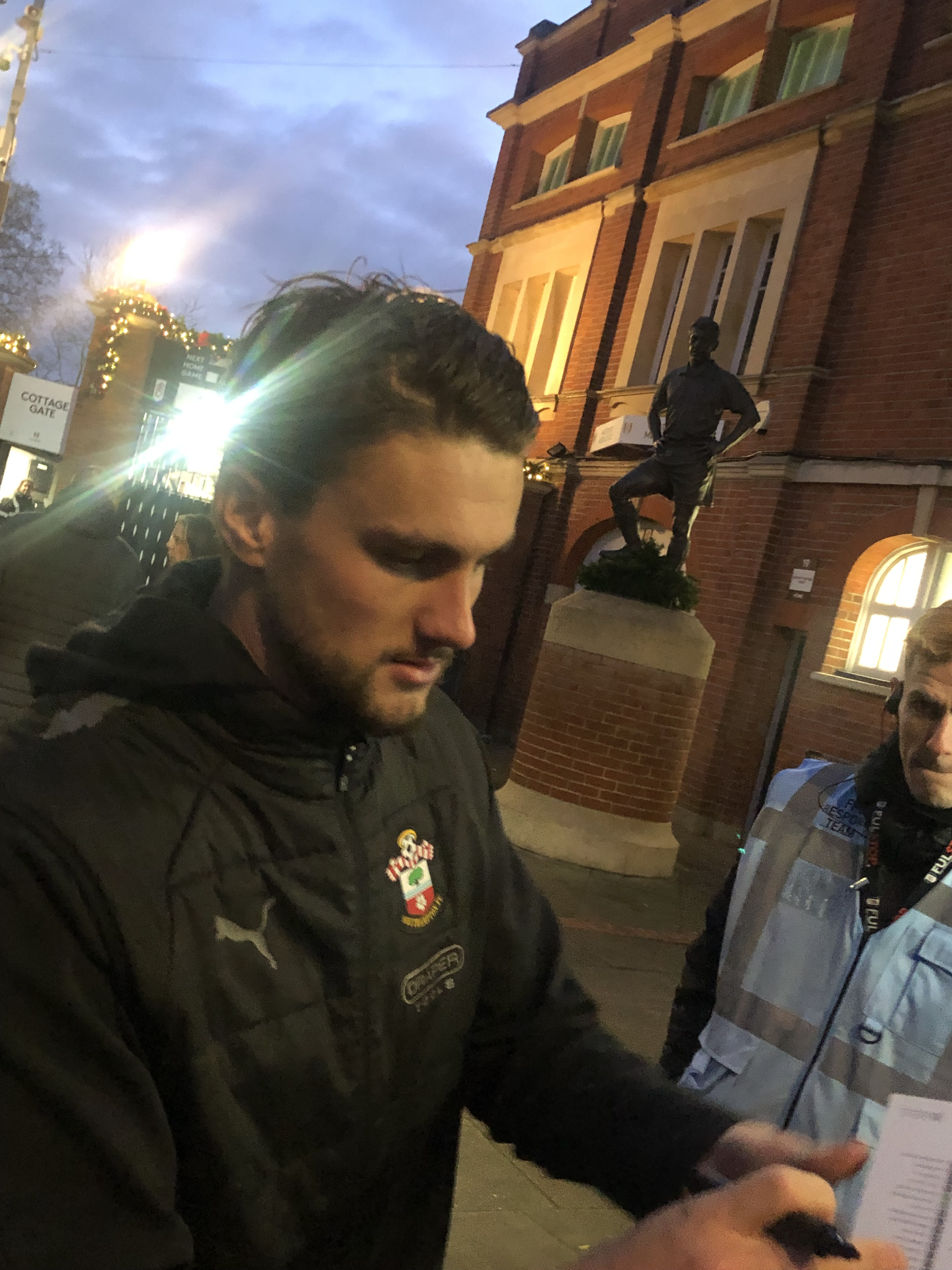
Taylor Harwood-Bellis made his hundreth appearance for the club during the 2025–26 season.

List of Southampton F.C. players with 100 or more appearances
| Player | Nationality | Pos | Club career | Starts | Subs | Total | Goals |
| Player | Nationality | Pos | Club career | Appearances | | | Goals |
|---|---|---|---|---|---|---|---|
| Jack Farrell | England | FW | 1895–1898; 1899–1900 | 116 | —N/a | 116 | 57 |
| Watty Keay | Scotland | FW | 1895–1900 | 113 | —N/a | 113 | 34 |
| Samuel Meston | Scotland | HB | 1895–1906 | 413 | —N/a | 413 | 27 |
| Joe Turner | Scotland | FW | 1895–1898; 1901–1904 | 200 | —N/a | 200 | 86 |
| George Clawley | England | GK | 1896–1898; 1903–1907 | 267 | —N/a | 267 | 0 |
| Harry Haynes | England | FB | 1896–1900 | 110 | —N/a | 110 | 6 |
| Jimmy Yates | England | FW | 1897–1898; 1898–1901; 1904–1905 | 106 | —N/a | 106 | 29 |
| Arthur Chadwick | England | HB | 1897–1901 | 141 | —N/a | 141 | 10 |
| Jack Robinson | England | GK | 1898–1903 | 201 | —N/a | 201 | 10 |
| Harry Wood | England | FW | 1898–1905 | 271 | —N/a | 271 | 84 |
| Archie Turner | England | FW | 1899–1902; 1904–1905 | 133 | —N/a | 133 | 43 |
| Bert Lee | England | HB | 1900–1906; 1911–1915 | 369 | —N/a | 369 | 18 |
| George Molyneux | England | FB | 1900–1905 | 229 | —N/a | 229 | 0 |
| Fred Harrison | England | FW | 1901–1908 | 249 | —N/a | 249 | 156 |
| Tommy Bowman | Scotland | HB | 1901–1904 | 148 | —N/a | 148 | 7 |
| John Fraser | Scotland | FW | 1902–1905 | 112 | —N/a | 112 | 33 |
| George Hedley | England | FW | 1903–1906 | 113 | —N/a | 113 | 54 |
| Fred Mouncher | England | FW | 1903–1907 | 162 | —N/a | 162 | 23 |
| Tom Burrows | England | GK | 1904–1911 | 111 | —N/a | 111 | 0 |
| Harry Brown | England | FW | 1905–1906; 1910–1913 | 100 | —N/a | 100 | 43 |
| Frank Jefferis | England | FW | 1905–1911 | 226 | —N/a | 226 | 61 |
| Horace Glover | England | FB | 1906–1911 | 209 | —N/a | 209 | 7 |
| John Robertson | Scotland | HB | 1906–1912 | 194 | —N/a | 194 | 2 |
| Jack Eastham | England | FB | 1906–1912 | 208 | —N/a | 208 | 4 |
| Joe Blake | England | FW | 1906–1920 | 183 | —N/a | 183 | 14 |
| John Bainbridge | England | FW | 1907–1910 | 113 | —N/a | 113 | 26 |
| John Johnston | Scotland | HB | 1907–1911 | 139 | —N/a | 139 | 1 |
| Herbert Lock | England | GK | 1907–1909; 1922–1923 | 101 | —N/a | 101 | 0 |
| Bert Trueman | England | HB | 1908–1911 | 106 | —N/a | 106 | 5 |
| Percy Prince | England | FW | 1908–1914; 1919 | 103 | —N/a | 103 | 29 |
| Alec Campbell | England | HB | 1908–1909; 1913–1914; 1915–1926 | 208 | —N/a | 208 | 15 |
| Sid Kimpton | England | FW | 1910–1920 | 176 | —N/a | 176 | 36 |
| James Denby | England | HB | 1911–1915 | 162 | —N/a | 162 | 12 |
| Jim McAlpine | Scotland | HB | 1911–1915 | 172 | —N/a | 172 | 3 |
| Sid Ireland | England | HB | 1911–1915 | 156 | —N/a | 156 | 2 |
| Len Andrews | England | FW | 1912–1919 | 215 | —N/a | 215 | 53 |
| Arthur Dominy | England | FW | 1913–1926 | 392 | —N/a | 392 | 155 |
| Joe Barratt | England | FW | 1919–1922 | 102 | —N/a | 102 | 8 |
| Fred Foxall | England | FW | 1919–1922 | 115 | —N/a | 115 | 13 |
| Tom Parker | England | FB | 1919–1926 | 280 | —N/a | 280 | 13 |
| Fred Titmuss | England | FB | 1919–1926 | 246 | —N/a | 246 | 0 |
| Bill Rawlings | England | FW | 1919–1931 | 377 | —N/a | 377 | 198 |
| Bill Turner | England | HB | 1919–1924 | 200 | —N/a | 200 | 1 |
| Bert Shelley | England | HB | 1920–1932 | 465 | —N/a | 465 | 9 |
| Tommy Allen | England | GK | 1920–1928 | 327 | —N/a | 327 | 0 |
| Ted Hough | England | FB | 1922–1930 | 195 | —N/a | 195 | 0 |
| Bill Henderson | England | FW | 1923–1928 | 177 | —N/a | 177 | 10 |
| George Harkus | England | HB | 1924–1936 | 334 | —N/a | 334 | 8 |
| Arthur Bradford | England | HB | 1924–1930; 1931–1932 | 248 | —N/a | 248 | 5 |
| Stan Woodhouse | England | HB | 1924–1936 | 383 | —N/a | 383 | 5 |
| Michael Keeping | England | HB | 1924–1933 | 286 | —N/a | 286 | 13 |
| Dick Rowley | Ireland | FW | 1926–1930 | 117 | —N/a | 117 | 62 |
| Bill Adams | England | FB | 1927–1936 | 219 | —N/a | 219 | 3 |
| Bill Luckett | England | HB | 1928–1936 | 229 | —N/a | 229 | 10 |
| Willie White | Scotland | GK | 1928–1932 | 107 | —N/a | 107 | 0 |
| Herbert Coates | England | FW | 1928–1934 | 111 | —N/a | 111 | 27 |
| Johnny Arnold | England | FW | 1929–1933 | 110 | —N/a | 110 | 46 |
| Johnny McIlwaine | Scotland | HB | 1930–1932; 1933–1936 | 123 | —N/a | 123 | 20 |
| Bert Scriven | England | GK | 1930–1937 | 241 | —N/a | 241 | 0 |
| Arthur Roberts | England | FB | 1931–1938 | 167 | —N/a | 167 | 0 |
| Charlie Sillett | England | FB | 1932–1938 | 191 | —N/a | 191 | 10 |
| Dick Neal | England | FW | 1932–1937 | 186 | —N/a | 186 | 19 |
| Tom Brewis | England | FW | 1932–1937 | 123 | —N/a | 123 | 18 |
| Arthur Holt | England | FW | 1933–1939 | 222 | —N/a | 222 | 50 |
| Fred Tully | England | FW | 1933–1937 | 107 | —N/a | 107 | 10 |
| Ted Bates | England | FW | 1937–1953 | 217 | —N/a | 217 | 64 |
| George Smith | England | FB | 1939–1948 | 102 | —N/a | 102 | 1 |
| Eric Webber | England | HB | 1939–1951 | 192 | —N/a | 192 | 0 |
| Don Roper | England | FW | 1946–1947; 1956–1959 | 133 | —N/a | 133 | 42 |
| Bill Ellerington | England | FB | 1946–1956 | 237 | —N/a | 237 | 11 |
| Bill Rochford | England | DF | 1946–1950 | 134 | —N/a | 134 | 0 |
| Eric Day | England | FW | 1946–1957 | 422 | —N/a | 422 | 158 |
| Joe Mallett | England | HB | 1947–1953 | 223 | —N/a | 223 | 3 |
| Stan Clements | England | HB | 1947–1954 | 120 | —N/a | 120 | 1 |
| George Curtis | England | FW | 1947–1951 | 183 | —N/a | 183 | 12 |
| Charlie Wayman | England | FW | 1947–1950 | 107 | —N/a | 107 | 77 |
| Ian Black | Scotland | GK | 1948–1950 | 104 | —N/a | 104 | 0 |
| Len Wilkins | England | HB | 1948–1958 | 275 | —N/a | 275 | 0 |
| Bryn Elliott | England | HB | 1950–1958 | 251 | —N/a | 251 | 2 |
| John Christie | Scotland | GK | 1951–1959 | 217 | —N/a | 217 | 0 |
| Pat Parker | England | HB | 1951–1959 | 145 | —N/a | 145 | 0 |
| Fred Kiernan | Ireland | GK | 1951–1956 | 136 | —N/a | 136 | 0 |
| Johnny Walker | Scotland | FW | 1952–1957 | 186 | —N/a | 186 | 52 |
| Tommy Traynor | Republic of Ireland | FB | 1952–1965 | 487 | 0 | 487 | 8 |
| John Page | England | HB | 1952–1961 | 216 | —N/a | 216 | 25 |
| John Hoskins | England | FW | 1952–1959 | 238 | —N/a | 238 | 67 |
| John Flood | Scotland | FW | 1953–1958 | 129 | —N/a | 129 | 29 |
| Bobby McLaughlin | England | HB | 1953–1959 | 178 | —N/a | 178 | 5 |
| Tommy Mulgrew | Scotland | FW | 1954–1962 | 330 | —N/a | 330 | 100 |
| Derek Reeves | England | FW | 1955–1962 | 311 | —N/a | 311 | 173 |
| Terry Paine | England | FW | 1957–1974 | 812 | 4 | 816 | 187 |
| John Sydenham | England | MF | 1957–1970 | 401 | 1 | 402 | 40 |
| Brian Clifton | England | FW | 1957–1962 | 123 | —N/a | 123 | 36 |
| Ron Davies | Wales | FB | 1958–1964 | 192 | —N/a | 192 | 0 |
| Tony Godfrey | England | GK | 1958–1965 | 149 | 0 | 149 | 0 |
| Cliff Huxford | England | MF | 1959–1967 | 317 | 3 | 320 | 4 |
| George O'Brien | Scotland | FW | 1959–1965 | 281 | —N/a | 281 | 180 |
| Ron Reynolds | England | GK | 1960–1963 | 111 | —N/a | 111 | 0 |
| Tony Knapp | England | DF | 1961–1967 | 260 | 0 | 260 | 2 |
| Ken Wimshurst | England | MF | 1961–1967 | 167 | 4 | 171 | 12 |
| Martin Chivers | England | FW | 1962–1968 | 189 | 1 | 190 | 106 |
| Stuart Williams | Wales | DF | 1962–1966 | 165 | 2 | 167 | 3 |
| Denis Hollywood | England | DF | 1962–1972 | 266 | 1 | 267 | 4 |
| Jimmy Melia | England | MF | 1964–1968 | 152 | 3 | 155 | 12 |
| Tony Byrne | Republic of Ireland | DF | 1965–1974 | 101 | 13 | 114 | 3 |
| Dave Walker | England | DF | 1965–1973 | 223 | 8 | 241 | 1 |
| Mick Channon | England | FW | 1966–1977; 1979–1982 | 602 | 5 | 607 | 228 |
| Ron Davies | Wales | FW | 1966–1973 | 277 | 4 | 281 | 153 |
| Hugh Fisher | Scotland | MF | 1967–1976 | 188 | 47 | 235 | 76 |
| Eric Martin | Scotland | GK | 1967–1975 | 289 | 1 | 290 | 0 |
| Jimmy Gabriel | Scotland | MF | 1967–1972 | 223 | 1 | 224 | 27 |
| Bob McCarthy | England | DF | 1967–1975 | 137 | 0 | 137 | 2 |
| Joe Kirkup | England | DF | 1968–1973 | 192 | 1 | 193 | 4 |
| John McGrath | England | DF | 1968–1973 | 194 | 1 | 195 | 2 |
| Bobby Stokes | England | FW | 1969–1977 | 238 | 26 | 264 | 55 |
| Brian O'Neil | England | MF | 1970–1974 | 171 | 2 | 173 | 19 |
| Jim Steele | Scotland | DF | 1972–1977 | 200 | 1 | 201 | 2 |
| Paul Gilchrist | England | FW | 1972–1976 | 120 | 13 | 133 | 22 |
| Paul Bennett | England | DF | 1972–1976 | 137 | 0 | 137 | 2 |
| David Peach | England | DF | 1974–1980 | 278 | 4 | 282 | 44 |
| Nick Holmes | England | MF | 1974–1987 | 535 | 8 | 542 | 64 |
| Peter Osgood | England | FW | 1974–1977 | 157 | 4 | 161 | 36 |
| Ian Turner | England | GK | 1974–1978 | 107 | 0 | 107 | 0 |
| Mel Blyth | England | DF | 1974–1977 | 135 | 0 | 135 | 7 |
| Manny Andruszewski | England | DF | 1975–1980 | 98 | 2 | 100 | 3 |
| Malcolm Waldron | England | DF | 1975–1983 | 217 | 1 | 218 | 11 |
| Steve Williams | England | MF | 1976–1984 | 346 | 3 | 349 | 27 |
| Ted MacDougall | Scotland | FW | 1976–1978 | 105 | 0 | 105 | 48 |
| Peter Wells | England | GK | 1976–1982 | 160 | 0 | 160 | 0 |
| Alan Ball | England | MF | 1976–1980; 1981–1982 | 234 | 0 | 234 | 13 |
| Trevor Hebberd | England | MF | 1977–1982 | 82 | 31 | 113 | 11 |
| Phil Boyer | England | FW | 1977–1980 | 162 | 0 | 162 | 61 |
| Chris Nicholl | Northern Ireland | DF | 1977–1983 | 268 | 0 | 268 | 9 |
| Graham Baker | England | MF | 1977–1982; 1987–1989 | 191 | 8 | 199 | 36 |
| Ivan Golac | Yugoslavia | DF | 1978–1982; 1983–1985 | 196 | 1 | 197 | 4 |
| Steve Moran | England | FW | 1980–1986 | 217 | 12 | 229 | 99 |
| Reuben Agboola | Nigeria | DF | 1980–1985 | 111 | 1 | 112 | 0 |
| Danny Wallace | England | FW | 1980–1989 | 299 | 18 | 317 | 79 |
| David Puckett | England | FW | 1981–1986 | 59 | 52 | 111 | 16 |
| Steve Baker | England | DF | 1981–1988 | 89 | 13 | 102 | 0 |
| David Armstrong | England | MF | 1981–1987 | 272 | 0 | 272 | 71 |
| George Lawrence | England | MF | 1981–1987 | 83 | 21 | 104 | 15 |
| Mark Wright | England | DF | 1982–1987 | 222 | 0 | 222 | 11 |
| Peter Shilton | England | GK | 1982–1987 | 242 | 0 | 242 | 0 |
| Mick Mills | England | DF | 1982–1985 | 123 | 0 | 123 | 3 |
| Mark Dennis | England | DF | 1983–1987 | 129 | 0 | 129 | 2 |
| Kevin Bond | England | DF | 1984–1988 | 173 | 1 | 174 | 6 |
| Jimmy Case | England | MF | 1985–1991 | 269 | 3 | 272 | 14 |
| Andy Townsend | England | MF | 1985–1988 | 89 | 12 | 101 | 5 |
| Glenn Cockerill | England | MF | 1985–1993 | 340 | 18 | 358 | 39 |
| Gerry Forrest | England | DF | 1985–1989 | 131 | 3 | 134 | 1 |
| Matt Le Tissier | England | MF | 1986–2002 | 462 | 78 | 540 | 209 |
| Tim Flowers | England | GK | 1986–1993 | 251 | 0 | 251 | 0 |
| Kevin Moore | England | DF | 1987–1994 | 180 | 5 | 185 | 13 |
| Rod Wallace | England | FW | 1987–1991 | 132 | 19 | 151 | 56 |
| Alan Shearer | England | FW | 1988–1992 | 140 | 18 | 158 | 43 |
| Russell Osman | England | DF | 1988–1991 | 120 | 4 | 124 | 6 |
| Francis Benali | England | DF | 1988–2003 | 321 | 48 | 359 | 1 |
| Neil Maddison | England | MF | 1988–1997 | 167 | 30 | 197 | 19 |
| Neil Ruddock | England | DF | 1989–1992 | 130 | 8 | 138 | 13 |
| Micky Adams | England | DF | 1989–1994 | 171 | 3 | 174 | 7 |
| Barry Horne | Wales | MF | 1989–1992 | 148 | 3 | 151 | 13 |
| Jason Dodd | England | DF | 1989–2004 | 453 | 30 | 483 | 13 |
| Jeff Kenna | Republic of Ireland | DF | 1991–1995 | 126 | 5 | 131 | 4 |
| Richard Hall | England | DF | 1991–1996 | 148 | 8 | 156 | 14 |
| Iain Dowie | Northern Ireland | FW | 1991–1995 | 133 | 10 | 143 | 32 |
| Ken Monkou | Netherlands | DF | 1992–1999 | 224 | 9 | 233 | 13 |
| Simon Charlton | England | DF | 1993–1997 | 121 | 15 | 136 | 3 |
| Dave Beasant | England | GK | 1993–1996 | 103 | 2 | 105 | 0 |
| Jim Magilton | Northern Ireland | MF | 1994–1997 | 148 | 8 | 156 | 18 |
| Matt Oakley | England | MF | 1995–2006 | 282 | 28 | 310 | 20 |
| Claus Lundekvam | Norway | DF | 1996–2007 | 403 | 10 | 413 | 2 |
| Egil Østenstad | Norway | FW | 1996–1999 | 92 | 17 | 109 | 33 |
| Kevin Davies | England | FW | 1997–1998; 1999–2003 | 89 | 36 | 125 | 25 |
| Paul Jones | Wales | GK | 1997–2003 | 220 | 3 | 223 | 0 |
| James Beattie | England | FW | 1998–2004 | 188 | 47 | 235 | 76 |
| Wayne Bridge | England | DF | 1998–2003 | 161 | 13 | 174 | 2 |
| Chris Marsden | England | MF | 1999–2003 | 137 | 15 | 152 | 8 |
| Marians Pahars | Latvia | FW | 1999–2006 | 127 | 29 | 156 | 45 |
| Jo Tessem | Norway | MF | 1999–2004 | 78 | 51 | 129 | 16 |
| Rory Delap | Republic of Ireland | MF | 2001–2006 | 135 | 17 | 152 | 5 |
| Anders Svensson | Sweden | MF | 2001–2005 | 116 | 31 | 147 | 13 |
| Paul Telfer | Scotland | DF | 2001–2005 | 129 | 19 | 148 | 1 |
| Brett Ormerod | England | FW | 2001–2006 | 74 | 42 | 116 | 19 |
| Fabrice Fernandes | France | MF | 2001–2005 | 88 | 18 | 106 | 6 |
| Antti Niemi | Finland | GK | 2002–2006 | 123 | 0 | 123 | 0 |
| Danny Higginbotham | Gibraltar | DF | 2003–2006 | 96 | 10 | 106 | 4 |
| Andrew Surman | England | MF | 2006–2009 | 128 | 18 | 146 | 18 |
| Jermaine Wright | England | MF | 2006–2008 | 95 | 5 | 100 | 1 |
| Kelvin Davis | England | GK | 2006–2016 | 299 | 2 | 301 | 0 |
| Bradley Wright-Phillips | England | FW | 2006–2009 | 66 | 55 | 121 | 25 |
| Adam Lallana | England | MF | 2006–2014; 2024–2025 | 245 | 38 | 283 | 60 |
| Morgan Schneiderlin | France | MF | 2008–2015 | 228 | 33 | 261 | 15 |
| Jack Cork | England | MF | 2008; 2011–2015 | 129 | 24 | 153 | 3 |
| Dan Harding | England | DF | 2009–2012 | 110 | 11 | 121 | 5 |
| Rickie Lambert | England | FW | 2009–2014 | 219 | 16 | 235 | 117 |
| Dean Hammond | England | MF | 2009–2013 | 130 | 15 | 145 | 11 |
| José Fonte | Portugal | DF | 2010–2017 | 283 | 5 | 288 | 15 |
| Guly do Prado | Brazil | FW | 2010–2014 | 80 | 38 | 118 | 23 |
| James Ward-Prowse | England | MF | 2011–2023; 2026– | 335 | 89 | 424 | 56 |
| Jack Stephens | England | DF | 2012– | 220 | 26 | 246 | 9 |
| Nathaniel Clyne | England | DF | 2012–2015 | 99 | 5 | 104 | 5 |
| Steven Davis | Northern Ireland | MF | 2012–2018 | 185 | 41 | 226 | 14 |
| Jay Rodriguez | England | FW | 2012–2017 | 81 | 45 | 126 | 35 |
| Maya Yoshida | Japan | DF | 2012–2020 | 172 | 22 | 194 | 9 |
| Ryan Bertrand | England | DF | 2014–2021 | 237 | 3 | 240 | 8 |
| Fraser Forster | England | GK | 2014–2022 | 162 | 0 | 162 | 0 |
| Shane Long | Republic of Ireland | FW | 2014–2022 | 124 | 121 | 245 | 36 |
| Dušan Tadić | Serbia | MF | 2014–2018 | 134 | 28 | 162 | 23 |
| Cédric Soares | Portugal | DF | 2015–2020 | 133 | 5 | 138 | 3 |
| Oriol Romeu | Spain | MF | 2015–2022; 2025–2026 | 217 | 46 | 263 | 9 |
| Pierre-Emile Højbjerg | Denmark | MF | 2016–2020 | 114 | 20 | 134 | 5 |
| Nathan Redmond | England | MF | 2016–2022 | 181 | 51 | 232 | 30 |
| Alex McCarthy | England | GK | 2016–2025 | 165 | 0 | 165 | 0 |
| Jan Bednarek | Poland | DF | 2017–2025 | 247 | 7 | 254 | 11 |
| Stuart Armstrong | Scotland | MF | 2018–2024 | 143 | 71 | 214 | 25 |
| Danny Ings | England | FW | 2018–2021 | 89 | 11 | 100 | 46 |
| Ché Adams | Scotland | FW | 2019–2024 | 126 | 65 | 191 | 49 |
| Kyle Walker-Peters | England | DF | 2020–2025 | 191 | 11 | 202 | 6 |
| Adam Armstrong | England | FW | 2021–2026 | 131 | 43 | 174 | 43 |
| Joe Aribo | Nigeria | MF | 2022–2025 | 62 | 49 | 111 | 9 |
| Ryan Manning | Republic of Ireland | DF | 2023– | 109 | 27 | 136 | 9 |
| Flynn Downes | England | MF | 2023– | 112 | 13 | 125 | 6 |
| Taylor Harwood-Bellis | England | DF | 2023–2026 | 131 | 3 | 134 | 12 |
