= Campbell Forsyth =

Scottish footballer (1934–2020)

Personal information
- Full name: Robert Campbell Forsyth
- Date of birth: 5 May 1934
- Place of birth: Plean, Stirlingshire, Scotland
- Date of death: 15 November 2020 (aged 86)
- Height: 6 ft 1 in (1.85 m)
- Position: Goalkeeper

Youth career
- Falkirk
- Shettleston

Senior career*
Years	Team	Apps	(Gls)
1955–1960	St Mirren	104	(0)
1960–1965	Kilmarnock	75	(0)
1965–1968	Southampton	48	(0)
Total		227	(0)

International career
1957	Scotland U23	1	(0)
1964	SFA trial v SFL	1	(0)
1964	Scotland	4	(0)
- * Club domestic league appearances and goals

Robert Campbell Forsyth (5 May 1934 – 15 November 2020) was a Scottish footballer, who played as a goalkeeper for St Mirren, Kilmarnock and Southampton. He also made four international appearances for Scotland, all in 1964.

== Football career ==
=== Early career ===
Born in Plean, then in Stirlingshire, Forsyth was briefly a trainee at nearby Falkirk before joining Junior Football club Shettleston from the east end of Glasgow. He joined St Mirren in April 1955, shortly before his 16th birthday, where he stayed for five years, making over 100 first-team appearances. In 1957 he played his one and only game for the Scotland national under-23 football team, a 1–1 draw with England.

=== Kilmarnock ===
In November 1960, he joined Kilmarnock; at the end of his first season with "Killie", the club gained the runners-up position in the Scottish League Division One. After finishing fifth in 1962, Kilmarnock were again runners-up in both 1963 and 1964, but in 1965 they finally claimed the title. Although Campbell had been the first-choice keeper throughout most of the championship-winning season, an ankle injury during the run-in put him out of the last few weeks of the season, with Bobby Ferguson replacing him for the last-day triumph.

Earlier in the championship-winning season, Forsyth had been involved in Kilmarnock's first-ever European tie, against Eintracht Frankfurt in the Inter-Cities Fairs Cup. Having lost the first leg 3–0, Kilmarnock pulled off a 5–1 victory in the second leg, with Forsyth making a "great save from Schämer's boot".

Campbell made his international debut for Scotland in a 1–0 win over England on 11 April 1964, in front of over 133,000 fans at Hampden Park. England had arrived at Hampden after a run of six consecutive wins, in which they had scored 28 goals, yet Campbell and the Scottish defence kept a clean sheet with Alan Gilzean scoring the only goal of the match after 72 minutes.

Campbell missed a game on 12 May, as his daughter was born the day before, but returned for three games later that year. Campbell suffered an injury and veteran keeper Bill Brown was brought back; Campbell never played again for the national side.

=== Southampton ===
In December 1965, he moved to England when he was signed by Southampton, then in the Football League Second Division, for a fee of £10,000. The deal had been arranged by manager Ted Bates some weeks earlier, but had been "put on ice" while Kilmarnock remained in the European Cup. Their defeat by Real Madrid in the first round proper enabled the deal to be finalised. Campbell immediately replaced Tony Godfrey and settled in quickly at The Dell, with his fine displays between the posts playing a prominent part in "The Saints" successful push for promotion.

He made his Southampton debut within days of his signing, in a 4–1 victory over Plymouth Argyle on 11 December. At the time of his debut, Southampton were seventh in the table, having lost seven of their first twenty games, but with only three further defeats, they ended the season as runners-up, one point ahead of Coventry City, thus securing promotion to the First Division for the first time in the club's history.

Forsyth retained the No. 1 shirt for the start of the Saints' debut season in the top flight but in the eighth game of the season, on 17 September 1966, he broke a leg in a collision with Denis Hollywood and Liverpool's Ian Callaghan, being replaced in goal by David Webb. With the only other professional 'keeper available being 19-year-old Gerry Gurr who was not considered ready for the First Division, manager Ted Bates signed Dave MacLaren from Wolverhampton Wanderers for a fee of £5,000, despite his having conceded nine goals to the Saints almost exactly 12 months previously.

By the start of the following season, Forsyth had fought his way back to fitness and was preferred to Eric Martin (who had been signed in March to strengthen the side). Forsyth was unable to re-discover his old form however, and was dropped in October after conceding a goal to Leicester City's 18-year-old goalkeeper, Peter Shilton. Forsyth misjudged Shilton's long punt upfield, which, instead of splashing harmlessly in the mud, spun off The Dell pitch and flew over Forsyth's head into the goal. "The Saints" lost the game 5–1.

Martin played the next five games, but after three straight defeats, Forsyth was recalled although he was unable to halt the club's slide down the table. Forsyth made his final Southampton appearance in a 5–3 defeat at home to Chelsea on 6 January 1968, in which he was blamed for two of Chelsea's goals. After a spell in the reserves, Forsyth decided to retire in May 1968.

== International appearances ==
Forsyth made four appearances for Scotland as follows:

Date	Venue	Opponent	Result	Goals	Competition
11 April 1964	Hampden Park, Glasgow	England	1–0	0	British Home Championship
3 October 1964	Ninian Park, Cardiff	Wales	2–3	0	British Home Championship
21 October 1964	Hampden Park, Glasgow	Finland	3–1	0	World Cup qualification
25 November 1964	Hampden Park, Glasgow	Northern Ireland	3–2	0	British Home Championship

== Later career ==
After retiring from football, Forsyth was employed by the pub and brewery chain Watney, as a representative for 28 years. He then became a corporate host for the Marriott hotel and country club at Dalmahoy near Edinburgh.

He also continued to serve Southampton as a scout; amongst the players that he recommended to the club were Jim Steele and Gerry O'Brien.

Forsyth died on 15 November 2020 at the age of 86.

== Honours ==
Kilmarnock

- Scottish Football League champions: 1964–65
  - Runners-up: 1960–61, 1962–63, 1963–64

Southampton

- Football League Second Division runners-up: 1965–66
