= Paul Bennett (footballer, born 1952) =

English footballer (born 1952)

Personal information
- Full name: Paul Reginald Bennett
- Date of birth: 4 February 1952 (age 74)
- Place of birth: Southampton, England
- Height: 6 ft 0 in (1.83 m)
- Position: Centre-back

Youth career
- 1968–1969: Southampton

Senior career*
Years	Team	Apps	(Gls)
1969–1976	Southampton	116	(1)
1976–1979	Reading	105	(3)
1979–1982	Aldershot	113	(2)
- Road-Sea Southampton
1987-88	Salisbury City		(0)
- Eastleigh
Total		334	(6)
- * Club domestic league appearances and goals

Paul Reginald Bennett (born 4 February 1952) is an English former footballer who played as a centre-back during the FA Cup run of Southampton in 1976, and also had spells at Reading and Aldershot.

== Early days ==
Born in Southampton, Bennett attended Taunton's Grammar School in Southampton, before joining the ground staff at The Dell.

== Playing career ==
=== Southampton ===
Bennett signed amateur papers in July 1968, before moving up to become a professional in November 1969.

He made his debut at home to Tottenham Hotspur on 22 April 1972, and was charged with marking Martin Chivers, who was a former Saints player and had coincidentally also attended Taunton's Grammar School.

Bennett was a rugged no-nonsense sort of centre-half in the same mould as John McGrath, the man he followed into the senior side. At 6 ft Bennett was not the tallest of centre-halves but he read the game well and was a fearless tackler.

In the 1972–73 season, partnering Jim Steele, he firmly established himself as one of the two central defenders with a run of 31 consecutive appearances during which he scored his only league goal for the club, away to Birmingham City on 21 October 1972.

In 1973–74 Bennett missed only six league games and scored a memorable winner - a 30-yard drive with his right foot - to eliminate Blackpool in the Third Round of the FA Cup at the Dell. The club were relegated that same year and when Saints subsequently bought Mel Blyth from Crystal Palace the following September, plus the emergence of the youngsters, Malcolm Waldron and Manny Andruszewski, Bennett found first team opportunities increasingly more elusive.

In 1975–76 Bennett was still very much part of the squad, making 20 outings in the League and playing in the 6th Round FA Cup win at Bradford City's Valley Parade, as Southampton moved on to the final on 1 May 1976, when they beat Manchester United to win the F.A. Cup.

After the F.A. Cup was won, Lawrie McMenemy started to build a team to win promotion back to Division 1 and Bennett was no longer part of his plans and after 137 games for the team, he left the Saints.

=== Reading ===
Reading signed Bennett in the summer of 1976 for a fee of £8000.

His first season at Elm Park was disappointing, as Reading were relegated to Division 4. The following season, with Maurice Evans as manager, things improved and in 1978–79, with Bennett featuring strongly, Reading won promotion. During this season Reading set a club record for clean sheets with 26 in the season including the last 11 games. Between March and August 1979, Bennett was one of the Reading back five that kept a clean sheet for 1,103 minutes - a record that stood until broken by Manchester Utd.

Paul was not offered a pay increase after promotion, so, after 195 league games, he transferred to Aldershot.

=== Aldershot ===
Aldershot signed Bennett in August 1979, for a then club record fee of £25,000.

He made over 100 appearances in three seasons at Aldershot playing in Division 4.

== After football ==
After leaving Aldershot, he played for various non-league teams, including Road-Sea Southampton, Salisbury City and Eastleigh, while starting a full-time career in community work.

He worked for four years at Oaklands School in Southampton, before moving on to the Eastpoint Centre in Thornhill, Southampton where he is now a director.

In 1998, he helped organise the celebrations for Ted Bates first 60 seasons at The Dell, with a testimonial including several former Saints players such as Terry Paine, Ron Davies, John Sydenham and Tony Knapp.

Bennett has also lectured Business at Southampton Solent University.

== Bibliography ==
- Jeremy Wilson (2006). Southampton's Cult Heroes. Know The Score Books. ISBN 1-905449-01-1.
- Duncan Holley & Gary Chalk (2003). In That Number - A post-war chronicle of Southampton FC. Hagiology Publishing. ISBN 0-9534474-3-X.
- Tim Manns (2006). Tie a Yellow Ribbon: How the Saints Won the Cup. Hagiology Publishing. ISBN 0-9534474-6-4.
