= David MacLaren =

David MacLaren may refer to:

- David Laurence MacLaren (1893–1960), Canadian politician
- Dave MacLaren (1934–2016), footballer

== See also ==
- David McLaren (disambiguation)
