= Steven Davis =

Northern Irish association football player (born 1985)

Steven Davis MBE
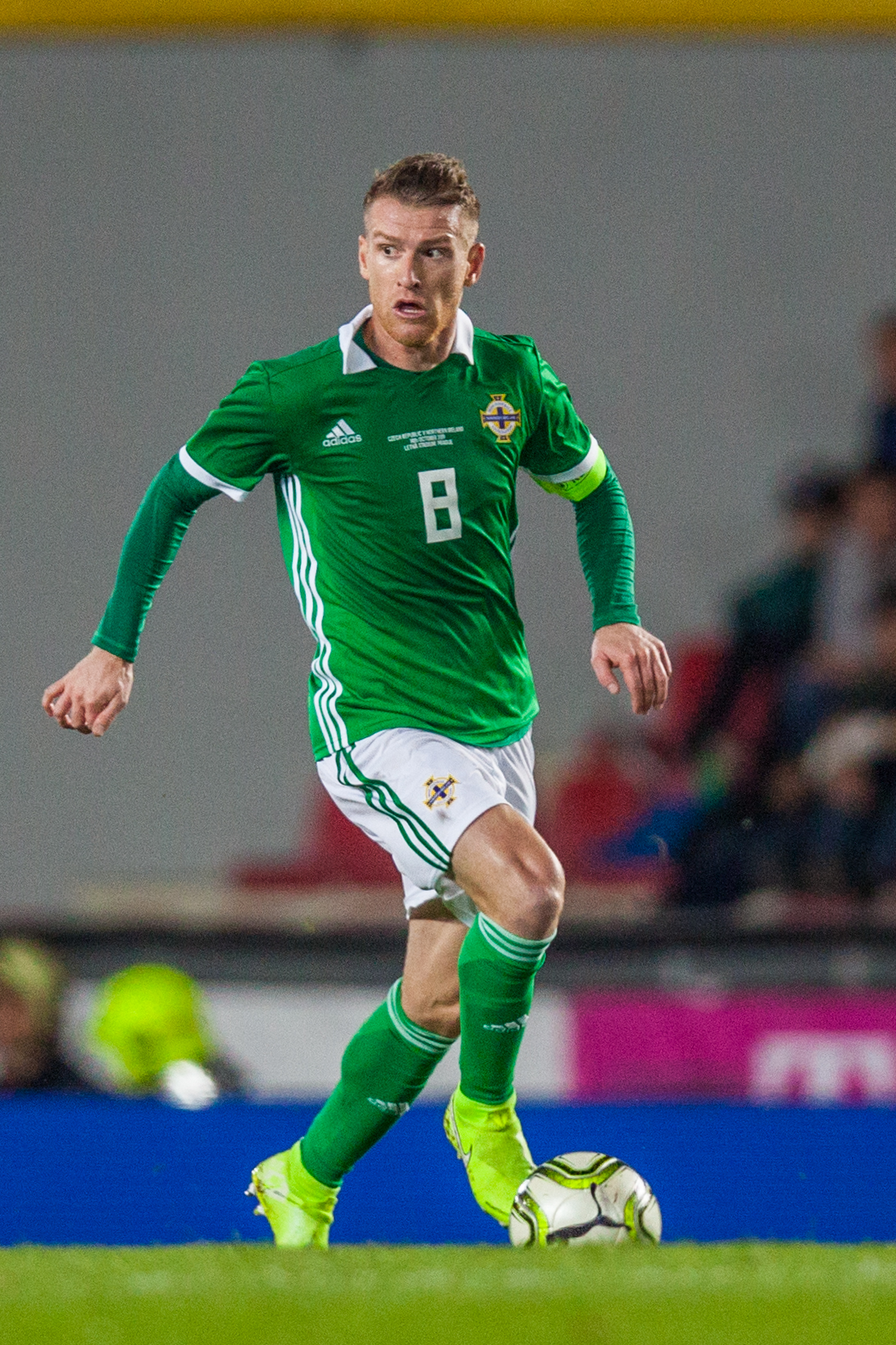
- Davis with Northern Ireland in 2019

Personal information
- Full name: Steven Davis
- Date of birth: 1 January 1985 (age 41)
- Place of birth: Ballymena, Northern Ireland
- Height: 5 ft 8 in (1.73 m)
- Position: Midfielder

Team information
- Current team: Blackburn Rovers (1st Team Coach)

Youth career
- St Andrews Boys Club
- 2002–2004: Aston Villa

Senior career*
Years	Team	Apps	(Gls)
2004–2007	Aston Villa	91	(5)
2007–2008	Fulham	22	(0)
2008	→ Rangers (loan)	12	(0)
2008–2012	Rangers	140	(18)
2012–2019	Southampton	193	(12)
2019	→ Rangers (loan)	14	(0)
2019–2024	Rangers	85	(1)
Total		557	(36)

International career
	Northern Ireland U15	8	(1)
	Northern Ireland U16	3	(0)
	Northern Ireland U17	8	(0)
	Northern Ireland U19	8	(0)
2003–2004	Northern Ireland U21	3	(0)
2004	Northern Ireland U23	1	(1)
2005–2022	Northern Ireland	140	(13)

Managerial career
- 2023: Rangers (caretaker)
- * Club domestic league appearances and goals

Steven Davis (born 1 January 1985) is a Northern Irish former professional footballer who played as a midfielder. He made his full international debut in 2005 and made 140 appearances at senior level, scoring 13 goals, to become the most capped Northern Ireland player, also a record for any man from the British home nations. He captained his country at UEFA Euro 2016 where they reached the last 16.

Davis began his club career with English Premier League club Aston Villa in 2004. He was named "Young Player of the Year", "The Fans Player of the Year" and "Player of the Year" for the 2005–06 season after making 42 appearances during the season. He was sold to Fulham for £4 million in the summer of 2007, but moved on loan to Scottish club Rangers in January 2008 for an initial six months. He was part of the team that reached the 2008 UEFA Cup final and won the 2007–08 Scottish League Cup and 2007–08 Scottish Cup. At the end of the season, he moved to Rangers permanently for £3 million. He won three consecutive Scottish Premier League titles with the Glasgow club in 2009, 2010 and 2011, as well as one further Scottish Cup in 2009 and two more League Cups (2010 and 2011).

Following Rangers’ parent company liquidation in 2012, Davis exercised his rights under TUPE regulations to rescind his contract and become a free agent, returning to the Premier League with Southampton where he made over 200 appearances across six full seasons and captained the side for much of that time, which included twice qualifying for the Europa League from league position and reaching the 2017 EFL Cup final.

Davis returned to Rangers under manager Steven Gerrard in 2019. He won another Scottish league title in 2021 and another Scottish Cup in 2022, as well as reaching the 2022 UEFA Europa League final. He announced his retirement from playing in January 2024, having been absent through injury for over a year (during which he was briefly the interim manager of Rangers, taking charge of two matches). He made 371 appearances, with 28 goals, across his two spells at Ibrox. In February 2026, Davis joined Blackburn Rovers as a first team coach.

== Club career ==
=== Aston Villa ===
Davis, who was born in Ballymena, County Antrim, started his career at St Andrews Boys Club in the DAWFL, before transferring to Aston Villa in 2002. He was a member of the 2002 FA Youth Cup winning team that beat Everton 4–2 in the final. His first professional appearance was on 18 September 2004, he was a 57th-minute replacement for Nolberto Solano in a goalless Premier League match against Norwich City at Carrow Road. Davis made 28 league appearances across the season, scoring the winner in a 3–2 comeback victory at Southampton on 16 April 2005.

On 13 August 2005, in Villa's first game of the new campaign, Davis volleyed past Jussi Jääskeläinen to secure a 2–2 home draw against Bolton Wanderers, albeit after nine minutes. He scored twice on 20 September in the third round of the Football League Cup, as Villa won 8–3 at Wycombe Wanderers. By October 2005, he was a regular for the club and missed only one game for Villa in the 2005–06 season. Davis was named Villa's "Young Player of the Year", "The Fans Player of the Year" and "Player of the Year" for the 2005–06 season. His form prompted the Northern Ireland manager Lawrie Sanchez, to state that Davis could be "another Frank Lampard". Davis made 102 appearances for Villa and scored nine times. On 2 January 2006, he headed the first goal of a 2–1 win at rivals West Bromwich Albion.

=== Fulham ===
In the summer of 2007, Davis followed teammate Aaron Hughes to Fulham on 5 July 2007 to team up with international manager Sanchez, for a fee of around £4 million. He made his Fulham debut against Arsenal on 12 August 2007 and made 22 appearances for Fulham before moving to Rangers.

=== Rangers ===
On 31 January 2008, Davis was signed on a six-month loan by Rangers, the club he supported as a boy. He made his Rangers debut against Panathinaikos in the UEFA Cup on 13 February. He scored his first goal, again in European competition, against German team Werder Bremen. Davis scored in the penalty shootout against Dundee United that won Rangers the League Cup. He also helped the team reach the 2008 UEFA Cup Final, and won the Scottish Cup in May.

Davis made his move from Fulham permanent on 21 August 2008 in a transfer worth £3 million, signing a four-year contract. He made his first appearance of the season a day later against Aberdeen, a 1–1 draw. He scored his first goal since his move became permanent against Motherwell. He scored the only goal in the final Old Firm derby of the season on 9 May 2009 to take Rangers to the top of the SPL by two points. Davis won the SPL title and Scottish Cup with Rangers in the 2008–09 season.

Davis scored his first goal of the 2009–10 season against St. Mirren on 27 January. He continued his goalscoring form against Falkirk in the next game, curling a free kick into Bobby Olejnik's top right hand corner. Davis's performances in January 2010 earned him the SPL Player of the Month award. He was also named PFA Scotland Players' Player of the Year on 2 May 2010, and won the SPL and Scottish League Cup for the second time each.

Davis scored his first goal of the 2010–11 season against Motherwell at Ibrox in October 2010, when he collected the ball 30 yards from goal before striking it into the top corner; the goal drew comparisons to former Rangers favourite Ian Durrant. Davis followed this up by scoring the winner in the match against Inverness at Ibrox in January 2011. In the 2011 Scottish League Cup Final against Celtic, Davis opened the scoring in a match which Rangers won 2–1 after extra time. This was the third time he had won the Scottish League Cup. Davis scored in back-to-back games in the 2011 title run-in against Motherwell and Hearts, before playing his 54th and final game of the season in a 5–1 win over Kilmarnock, as Rangers won their 3rd consecutive SPL championship.

On 19 July 2011, Davis signed a new five-year contract with Rangers. He was made temporary captain, with the absence of formal club captain David Weir for the first part of the 2011–12 season. Davis scored his first goal of the 2011–12 season in a 2–0 win over Aberdeen at Ibrox in August. In the first Old Firm match of the 2011–12 season, he provided two assists as Rangers beat Celtic 4–2. After Rangers beat Dunfermline 4–0 at East End Park, Rangers manager Ally McCoist praised Davis's performance by saying "It was a captain's performance from the best player on the park." For his performances during September 2011, he received the SPL Player of the Month award.

Following the insolvency of Rangers in 2012, Davis exercised his rights under TUPE regulations to rescind his contract and become a free agent. PFA Scotland had previously commented that players were entitled to become free agents if they objected to the transfer to the new company formed by Charles Green.

=== Southampton ===
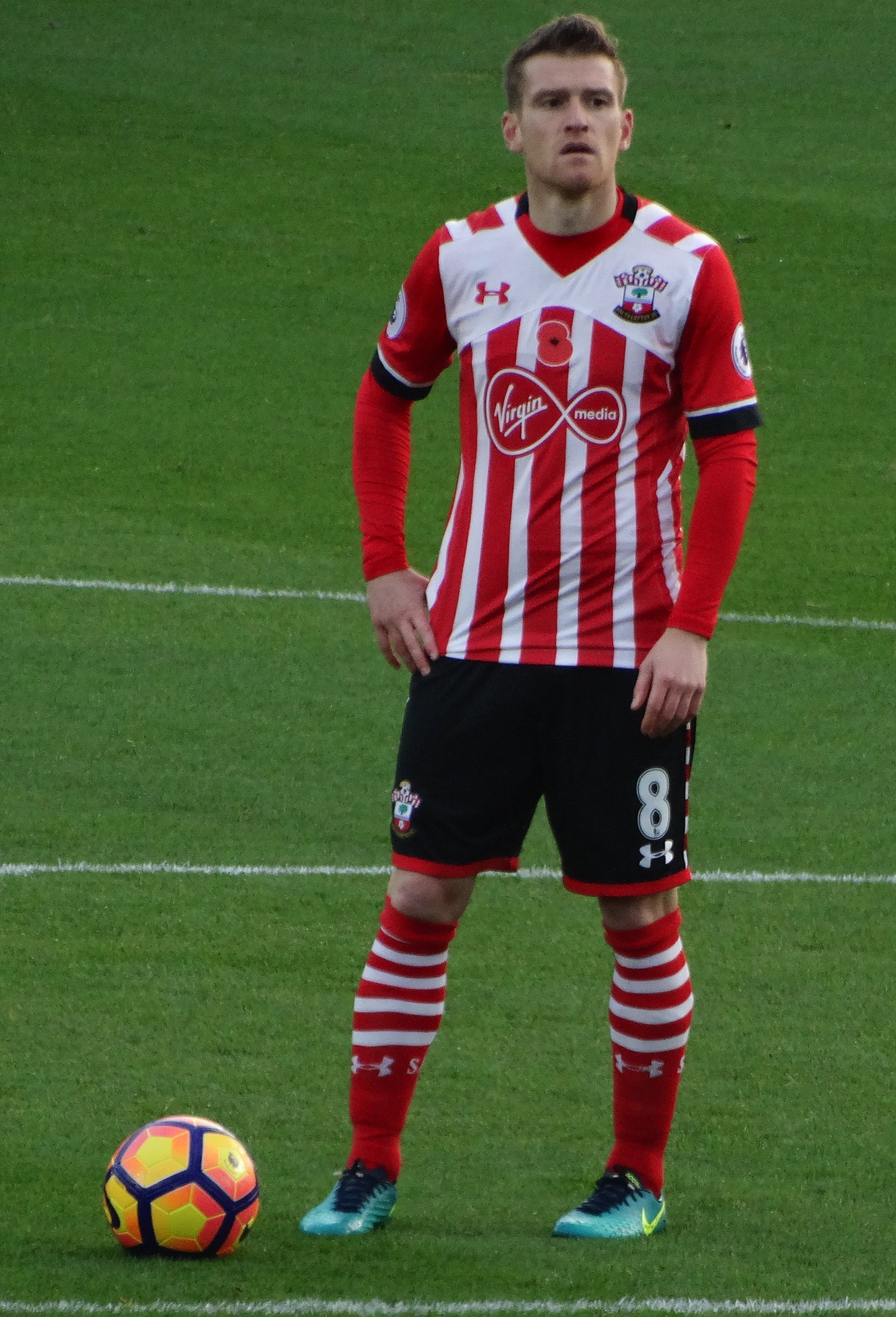
Davis playing for Southampton in 2016

Davis rejected the chance to stay with Rangers and instead signed a three-year contract with Premier League club Southampton on 6 July 2012. The deal was subsequently extended to 2016 as part of the agreement with Rangers to complete the transfer without the need for the international transfer clearance to be agreed by FIFA, with the two clubs agreeing a fee. After joining Southampton, Davis pleaded the Rangers fans to agree with his decision to leave but accepted that a minority of fans would take a different view and explained that he left Rangers in order to revive his football career.

He made his debut on 19 August 2012, and scored to put the team ahead at holders Manchester City only three minutes after coming on as a substitute, but Southampton eventually lost 3–2. His only other goal of the season came against the same opposition, in a 3–1 home win on 13 February 2013.

His first two goals of the 2013–14 season came in a 5–1 victory at Barnsley in the League Cup second round on 27 August, the latter being a penalty.

On 17 October 2014, Davis signed a new contract to keep him at Southampton until 2018.

On 8 May 2016, Davis scored his first ever league brace for Southampton in a 2–1 win over Tottenham Hotspur at White Hart Lane. He followed this up with a goal in a 4–1 victory over Crystal Palace on the final day of the season.

On 18 June 2016, he signed a new three-year contract, extending his stay with the club until 2019.

He made his 200th Southampton appearance on 16 September 2017 against Crystal Palace, scoring the only goal in a 1–0 victory.

=== Return to Rangers ===
On 6 January 2019, Davis returned to Rangers on a six-month loan. On 2 May, Davis agreed to join Rangers permanently once the loan deal had finished, signing a 12-month contract. Davis helped Rangers win the 2020–21 Scottish Premiership, their first Scottish league championship since 2011, and he won the SFWA Footballer of the Year award.

Davis tore his anterior cruciate ligament in December 2022, an injury which required surgery and a long rehabilitation process.

On 25 January 2024, Davis (aged 39) announced his retirement from football as a result of the injury.

== International career ==
Davis made his full international debut on 9 February 2005 in a 1–0 loss to Canada, and made the assist for David Healy in Northern Ireland's famous 1–0 victory over England in a 2006 World Cup qualification match on 7 September. Davis' first goal came against Wales in a 3–2 home defeat in another qualifier on 8 October. He was also part of the team who beat Spain 3–2 at Windsor Park in September 2006.

On 21 May 2006, he became Northern Ireland's youngest modern day captain against Uruguay in the United States, a 1–0 loss.

On 8 October 2015, Davis scored twice in a 3–1 victory over Greece to help Northern Ireland qualify for the final tournament of Euro 2016, their first European Championship.

In November 2019, he won his 116th cap against the Netherlands and became the most capped British midfielder, passing David Beckham. On 7 September 2020, he equalled Pat Jennings's Northern Ireland record of 119 caps. On 8 October 2020, he played his 120th match for Northern Ireland against Bosnia and Herzegovina in the UEFA Euro 2020 qualifying play-offs to become the most-capped player in their history. As of February 2023 he had 140 caps, making him the most capped British or Irish men's player of all time.

== Coaching career ==
Following the dismissal of Michael Beale on 1 October 2023, Davis was announced as the manager of Rangers on an interim basis. He reported that this "came out of the blue" and that it "was too good an opportunity to turn down". He took charge of two games, a Europa League defeat by Aris Limassol and a league win against St Mirren, before Philippe Clement was appointed manager on 15 October.

On 13 February 2026, Davis joined Blackburn Rovers as a first team coach.

== Personal life ==
Davis was appointed Member of the Order of the British Empire (MBE) in the 2017 Birthday Honours for services to football.

== Career statistics ==
=== Club ===
Appearances and goals by club, season and competition
Club	Season	League			National cup (Note: Includes FA Cup, Scottish Cup)		League cup (Note: Includes Football League Cup, Scottish League Cup)		Europe		Total	
Club	Season	Division	Apps	Goals	Apps	Goals	Apps	Goals	Apps	Goals	Apps	Goals
Aston Villa	2004–05	Premier League	28	1	1	0	0	0	—		29	1
Aston Villa	2005–06	Premier League	35	4	4	2	3	2	—		42	8
Aston Villa	2006–07	Premier League	28	0	0	0	3	0	—		31	0
Aston Villa	Total		91	5	5	2	6	2	0	0	102	9
Fulham	2007–08	Premier League	22	0	1	0	2	0	—		25	0
Rangers (loan)	2007–08	Scottish Premier League	12	0	4	0	1	0	9 (Note: Appearances in UEFA Cup)	1	26	1
Rangers	2008–09	Scottish Premier League	34	6	5	1	4	0	0	0	43	7
Rangers	2009–10	Scottish Premier League	36	3	5	0	3	1	6 (Note: Appearances in UEFA Champions League)	0	50	4
Rangers	2010–11	Scottish Premier League	37	4	3	0	3	1	10 (Note: Six appearances in UEFA Champions League, four appearances in UEFA Europa League)	0	53	5
Rangers	2011–12	Scottish Premier League	33	5	1	0	1	0	4 (Note: Two appearances in UEFA Champions League, two appearances in UEFA Europa League) (Note: Soccerbase does not list a home UEFA Champions League match appearance v Maribor)	0	39	5
Rangers	Total		152	18	18	1	12	2	29	1	211	22
Southampton	2012–13	Premier League	32	2	1	0	0	0	—		33	2
Southampton	2013–14	Premier League	34	2	3	0	3	2	—		40	4
Southampton	2014–15	Premier League	35	0	3	0	3	0	—		41	0
Southampton	2015–16	Premier League	34	5	1	0	3	0	3 (Note: Appearances in UEFA Europa League)	0	41	5
Southampton	2016–17	Premier League	32	0	0	0	4	0	4	0	40	0
Southampton	2017–18	Premier League	23	3	2	0	0	0	—		25	3
Southampton	2018–19	Premier League	3	0	0	0	3	0	—		6	0
Southampton	Total		193	12	10	0	16	2	7	0	226	14
Rangers (loan)	2018–19	Scottish Premiership	14	0	4	0	—		—		18	0
Rangers	2019–20	Scottish Premiership	24	0	3	0	2	0	14	1	43	1
Rangers	2020–21	Scottish Premiership	35	0	3	1	1	1	10	0	49	2
Rangers	2021–22	Scottish Premiership	18	0	3	0	1	0	11 (Note: Two appearances in UEFA Champions League, eight appearances in UEFA Europa League)	1	33	1
Rangers	2022–23	Scottish Premiership	8	1	0	0	2	1	6 (Note: Appearances in UEFA Champions League)	0	16	2
Rangers	Total		99	1	13	1	6	2	41	2	159	6
Career total			557	36	47	4	42	8	77	3	723	51

=== International ===
Appearances and goals by national team and year
National team	Year	Apps	Goals
Northern Ireland	2005	10	1
Northern Ireland	2006	7	0
Northern Ireland	2007	9	0
Northern Ireland	2008	6	1
Northern Ireland	2009	7	0
Northern Ireland	2010	5	0
Northern Ireland	2011	7	2
Northern Ireland	2012	6	0
Northern Ireland	2013	8	1
Northern Ireland	2014	6	0
Northern Ireland	2015	8	3
Northern Ireland	2016	13	1
Northern Ireland	2017	9	1
Northern Ireland	2018	6	1
Northern Ireland	2019	10	1
Northern Ireland	2020	7	0
Northern Ireland	2021	8	0
Northern Ireland	2022	8	1
Total		140	13

Northern Ireland score listed first, score column indicates score after each Davis goal.

International goals by date, venue, cap, opponent, score, result and competition
No.	Date	Venue	Cap	Opponent	Score	Result	Competition
1	8 October 2005	Windsor Park, Belfast, Northern Ireland	8	Wales	2–2	2–3	2006 FIFA World Cup qualification
2	15 October 2008	Windsor Park, Belfast, Northern Ireland	32	San Marino	4–0	4–0	2010 FIFA World Cup qualification
3	10 August 2011	Windsor Park, Belfast, Northern Ireland	47	Faroe Islands	2–0	4–0	UEFA Euro 2012 qualification
4	7 October 2011	Windsor Park, Belfast, Northern Ireland	50	Estonia	1–0	1–2	UEFA Euro 2012 qualification
5	15 October 2013	Ramat Gan Stadium, Ramat Gan, Israel	64	Israel	1–1	1–1	2014 FIFA World Cup qualification
6	8 October 2015	Windsor Park, Belfast, Northern Ireland	77	Greece	1–0	3–1	UEFA Euro 2016 qualification
7	8 October 2015	Windsor Park, Belfast, Northern Ireland	77	Greece	3–0	3–1	UEFA Euro 2016 qualification
8	13 November 2015	Windsor Park, Belfast, Northern Ireland	79	Latvia	1–0	1–0	Friendly
9	8 October 2016	Windsor Park, Belfast, Northern Ireland	89	San Marino	1–0	4–0	2018 FIFA World Cup qualification
10	1 September 2017	San Marino Stadium, Serravalle, San Marino	96	San Marino	3–0	3–0	2018 FIFA World Cup qualification
11	11 September 2018	Windsor Park, Belfast, Northern Ireland	103	Israel	1–0	3–0	Friendly
12	21 March 2019	Windsor Park, Belfast, Northern Ireland	108	Estonia	2–0	2–0	UEFA Euro 2020 qualification
13	25 March 2022	Stade de Luxembourg, Luxembourg City, Luxembourg	133	Luxembourg	2–0	3–0	Friendly

=== Managerial statistics ===
As of match played 8 October 2023

Managerial record by team and tenure
Team	Nat	From	To	Record				
Team	Nat	From	To	G	W	D	L	Win %
Rangers (interim)	(Scotland)	1 October 2023	15 October 2023	2	1	0	1	50.00
Career Total				2	1	0	1	50.0

== Honours ==
Aston Villa U18

- FA Youth Cup: 2001–02

Rangers

- Scottish Premier League / Scottish Premiership: 2008–09, 2009–10, 2010–11, 2020–21
- Scottish Cup: 2007–08, 2008–09, 2021–22
- Scottish League Cup: 2007–08, 2009–10, 2010–11
- UEFA Cup / UEFA Europa League runner-up: 2007–08, 2021–22

Southampton

- EFL Cup runner-up: 2016–17

Individual

- PFA Scotland Players' Player of the Year: 2009–10
- PFA Scotland Team of the Year: 2008–09 SPL, 2009–10 SPL, 2011–12 SPL, 2020–21 Scottish Premiership
- SFWA Footballer of the Year: 2020–21
- Scottish Premier League Player of the Month: January 2010, September 2011
- Irish Football Association International Player of the Year: 2015, 2016
- NIFWA International Personality of the Year: 2006, 2010, 2014
- Aston Villa Supporters' Player of the Year: 2005–06
- Aston Villa Players' Player of the Year: 2005–06
- Aston Villa Young Player of the Year: 2005–06
- Rangers Hall of Fame: 2023
- Premier League Milestone Award (300 appearances)

== See also ==
- List of men's footballers with 100 or more international caps
- List of Rangers F.C. players
- List of Southampton F.C. players
