= Hundvåg FK =

Norwegian football club

- Full name: Hundvåg Fotballklubb
- Founded: 1971
- League: 3. divisjon
- 2012: Fourth Division, Rogaland 3, 1st (promoted)
Home colours

Hundvåg Fotballklubb is an association football club from the suburban island of Hundvåg in Stavanger, Norway.

In August 2005 the football club became independent from Hundvåg IL. This meant that the organising of members became easier, and the finances of the club were more manageable. Having played five consecutive seasons in the Norwegian Division Three, the side were relegated following the 2005 season. Tony Knapp managed the side at the time.. In 2012, the team won promotion back to 3. divisjon.
