= David McLaren =

David McLaren may refer to:

- David McLaren (colonial manager) (1785–1850), colonial manager (CEO) of the colony of South Australia (1837–1841)
- David McLaren (politician) (1872–1939), mayor of Wellington and member of the New Zealand Parliament

== See also ==
- David MacLaren (disambiguation)
