= Gerry Gurr =

English footballer

Personal information
- Full name: Gerald Gurr
- Date of birth: 20 October 1946 (age 80)
- Place of birth: Brighton, England
- Height: 6 ft 1 in (1.85 m)
- Position: Goalkeeper

Youth career
- 1962–1963: Arsenal
- 1963: Queens Park Rangers

Senior career*
Years	Team	Apps	(Gls)
1963–1964	Guildford City	?	(0)
1964–1970	Southampton	42	(0)
1970–1972	Aldershot	55	(0)
Total		97	(0)
- * Club domestic league appearances and goals

Gerald Gurr (born 20 October 1946 in Brighton) is an English former footballer who played as a goalkeeper.

== Playing career ==
Gurr began his career at Arsenal as a young player, initially as a forward player, in 1962 before moving to join Queens Park Rangers's academy in 1963. While at QPR, Gurr had trials at other league clubs including Leicester City and Northampton Town. After leaving QPR he joined Guildford City in late 1963. While playing for Guildford he was spotted by Southampton and handed a trial in January 1964. This trial proved successful, and he joined Southampton as a professional later that year. However, it was to be another three years before Gurr made his debut for Southampton against Leicester City at The Dell on 14 January 1967 in a 4–4 draw. In this game the then 20-year-old Gurr saved a penalty. His performance in this game despite conceding four times was good with manager Ted Bates promising the young keeper that he would keep his place. However, an injury meant he missed out and on his return in a reserve friendly against local rivals Portsmouth he again performed well, but not well enough to stop manager Bates signing Eric Martin from Dunfermline Athletic. It would be 20 months before Gurr got a chance in the First Division again.

Gurr's performances over the 1968–69 season and at the beginning of the 1969–70 season were significant enough for some suggestions that he should receive a call-up to the England side; however, injury would again provide a cruel blow with a shoulder injury effectively ending his Southampton career and international hopes. Gurr made 49 appearances in all competitions for Southampton, with 42 of those in the league.

After Southampton, Gurr was persuaded to move to Fourth Division Aldershot, then managed by former Southampton teammate Jimmy Melia. He played 55 league games in the Fourth Division under Melia before ending his football career in 1972.

== After football ==
Gurr had always been an accomplished musician, having played the guitar since the age of eight, and while at Southampton had assembled a band called "The Sunsets" with teammates Mick Judd and Dave Paton.

He now lives with his wife, Lee Ann, and daughter, and is now writing and recording his own material after being on the road with his wife for many years in many musical guises.
