= Geoff Barnard =

English footballer

Personal information
- Full name: Geoffrey Barnard
- Date of birth: 23 March 1946 (age 80)
- Place of birth: Southend, England
- Position: Goalkeeper

Youth career
- Norwich City

Senior career*
Years	Team	Apps	(Gls)
1963–1968	Norwich City	6	(0)
1968–1975	Scunthorpe United	265	(0)
1975–1976	Scarborough		
1976–1977	Scunthorpe United	6	(0)
Total		277	(0)
- * Club domestic league appearances and goals

Geoffrey Barnard (born 23 March 1946) is an English former professional footballer who played as a goalkeeper.

== Career ==
Born in Southend, Barnard played for Norwich City, Scunthorpe United and Scarborough.
