= Dave MacLaren =

Scottish footballer and manager

Personal information
- Full name: David MacLaren
- Date of birth: 12 June 1934
- Place of birth: Auchterarder, Scotland
- Date of death: 6 December 2016 (aged 82)
- Place of death: Castlemaine, Victoria, Australia
- Height: 1.88 m (6 ft 2 in)
- Position: Goalkeeper

Senior career*
Years	Team	Apps	(Gls)
1953	Hong Kong FC		(0)
1954–1955	Penang		(0)
1956–1957	Dundee	1	(0)
1957–1960	Leicester City	85	(0)
1960–1965	Plymouth Argyle	131	(0)
1965–1966	Wolverhampton Wanderers	44	(0)
1966–1967	Southampton	22	(0)
Total		283	(0)

International career
1954	Malaya	1	(0)
1954–1955	Malaya XI	2	(0)

Managerial career
- 1970–1971: Malaysia
- 1972–1976: Sydney City
- 1977–1979: South Melbourne Hellas
- * Club domestic league appearances and goals

David MacLaren (12 June 1934 – 6 December 2016) was a footballer who played as a goalkeeper. Although born in Scotland, he spent most of his playing career in England, before turning to management in Malaysia and Australia.

== Playing career ==
While completing his National Service as a radar technician in the RAAF, MacLaren represented Hong Kong FC and helped Penang win the Malaya Cup in 1954. He also attracted the attention of Chelsea manager, Ted Drake to signing him for Chelsea before he returned to Scotland and joined Dundee. He managed only one first team appearance for the team though, before heading to England in January 1957, where he would spend the rest of his playing career.

He joined Leicester City and immediately won promotion to the First Division as he became first choice, but he lost his place to the emerging Gordon Banks during the 1959–60 season. McLaren took this as his cue to depart and joined Second Division Plymouth Argyle at the end of the season.

The goalkeeper made more appearances for Plymouth than any of his other league clubs (131 league games) over five seasons in the second tier, before being signed by Wolves in early 1965. He spent only one full season at Molineux as the club attempted to regain their top flight status at the first attempt in 1965–66, but fell short.

MacLaren got a chance to return to the First Division though when newly promoted Southampton signed him soon into the following season, despite McLaren having been in goal for Wolves when Southampton had scored nine against them in the previous season (in a 9–3 victory).

He lasted just a single season at The Dell, making 22 league appearances, before losing his place to Eric Martin. After leaving Southampton he joined non-league Worcester City.

MacLaren died in Castlemaine, Victoria, Australia on 6 December 2016 after a long illness.

== International career ==
While in Penang, he was selected in a Malaya national football team and played in exhibition matches. On 18 September 1954, he played for Malaya against Singapore in a 3–0 defeat. He then played for Malaya against Kalmar FF in a 1–1 draw on 20 November 1954.

The following year, on 11 February 1955, he played against Admira in a 1–1 draw.

== Coaching career ==
After retiring from playing, he took on a new challenge in Malaysia as manager of Malaysia national team between 1970 and 1971. As national manager, MacLaren guided Malaysia to qualify for the 1972 Munich Olympic Games as group leaders.

After that, he returned to Australia to manage Sydney City. In 1977, he became South Melbourne Hellas manager for two years.

== Personal life ==
MacLaren's brothers, Jimmy and Roy, were also professional footballers. All three MacLaren brothers were goalkeepers.

== Honours ==
=== Player ===
Penang

- Malaysia Cup: 1954

Leicester City

- Second Division: 1956–57

Individual

- Malaya Sportsman of the Year: 1954

=== Manager ===
Sydney City

- NSW NPL Grand Final: Finalists 1973, 1974
- NSW NPL Minor Premiership: 1973, 1974
- Ampol Cup: 1973
- Waratah Cup: 1976
