= Malcolm Waldron =

English footballer

Personal information
- Full name: Malcolm Waldron
- Date of birth: 6 September 1956 (age 70)
- Place of birth: Emsworth, England
- Height: 6 ft 0 in (1.83 m)
- Position: Centre back

Youth career
- 1973–1974: Southampton

Senior career*
Years	Team	Apps	(Gls)
1974–1983	Southampton	178	(10)
1981	→ Washington Diplomats (loan)		
1983–1984	Burnley	16	(0)
1984–1986	Portsmouth	23	(1)
1986–1987	Road-Sea Southampton		
Total		217	(11)

International career
1979	England B	1	(0)
- * Club domestic league appearances and goals

Malcolm Waldron (born 6 September 1956) is an English former professional footballer who played as a centre back. He spent the majority of his playing career at Southampton. In the summer of 1981, Waldron was sent on loan to Washington Diplomats. In 1983, he moved to Burnley before joining Portsmouth a year later where he ended his professional career.

== Club career ==
=== Southampton ===
Born in Emsworth, Hampshire, Waldron was initially spotted playing for Havant and Hampshire school teams and was snapped up by Southampton, joining them as an apprentice in July 1973 before signing professional papers on reaching 18 in September 1974.

He made his debut on 12 April 1975 in a 0–0 draw away to Nottingham Forest. However, he only made a couple of appearances that season and hardly featured the following before establishing himself as a regular member of the Saints' defence in 1976–77. That season, he scored in a 4–0 victory against Marseille in the first leg of the European Cup first round.

During Southampton's promotion season in 1977–78, he wore six different numbers as he played in several different positions to accommodate Chris Nicholl and Mike Pickering as a pairing in the centre of defence.

He really came to the fore in Saints' first season back in Division 1, playing in all 56 matches including the final of the League Cup in 1979 which Southampton lost to Nottingham Forest. He was voted Saints' "Player of the Season" for 1978–79 and in the following season he was called up for the England B team against New Zealand.

Waldron suffered a career-threatening achilles tendon injury which was overcome by surgery and was sent for rehabilitation in the summer of 1981 to the United States for Washington Diplomats. After they failed to sign him permanently, he returned to Southampton.

In April 1982, Waldron underwent an operation for a routine removal of a cyst on his knee, but the surgery was botched – he made only three appearances over the next 18 months.

Waldron made a total of 218 appearances for Southampton over eight years, scoring 11 goals. Waldron is described in Holley & Chalk's The Alphabet of the Saints as being "extememly agile and lithe for a big man, he also packed a thunderbolt of a shot and scored some memorable goals for the club".

=== Later career ===
He joined Burnley in 1983, and was surprised to pass the medical. However, he was unhappy during his spell at Burnley, and the following May he moved to his home-town club, Portsmouth. At Fratton Park, Waldron continued to suffer from the knee injury and he eventually retired from professional football in December 1986. He turned out for non-league club Road-Sea Southampton in their final 1986–87 season.

== Personal life ==
After football, he worked for Abbey Life and latterly as health care adviser for BUPA in Poole. Following his work as a divisional manager for Norwich Union, Waldron started his own business brokering private medical insurance.

== Honours ==
Southampton

- Football League Cup runner-up: 1978–79
