= Mel Blyth =

English footballer (1944–2024)

Personal information
- Full name: Melvin Bernard Blyth
- Date of birth: 28 July 1944
- Place of birth: Norwich, England
- Date of death: 11 January 2024 (aged 79)
- Height: 6 ft 1 in (1.85 m)
- Position: Centre back

Youth career
- Norwich City

Senior career*
Years	Team	Apps	(Gls)
1967–1968	Scunthorpe United	27	(3)
1968–1974	Crystal Palace	216	(9)
1974–1978	Southampton	105	(6)
1977–1978	→ Crystal Palace (loan)	6	(0)
1978	Cape Town City		
1978	Margate		
1978–1981	Millwall	75	(0)
1980	Houston Hurricane (summer)		
1981	Bulova SA		
1982	Andover		
Total		429	(18)
- * Club domestic league appearances and goals

Melvin Bernard Blyth (28 July 1944 – 11 January 2024) was an English professional footballer who played as a centre back.

During his playing career, he joined Scunthorpe United in 1967. One year later, he signed for Crystal Palace before joining Southampton, with which club he won the FA Cup in 1976. He also spent time with Cape Town City, Margate, Millwall, Houston Hurricane, Bulova SA and Andover.

== Club career ==
=== Norwich City and Scunthorpe United ===
Blyth began his football career with non-league Great Yarmouth Town. He then joined Norwich City, although he never made an appearance in the first team. In October 1967, former Norwich manager Ron Ashman took up the reins at Scunthorpe United, at the time struggling at the foot of the Third Division. He returned to his old club to sign several players, including Blyth, Steve Deere and Geoff Barnard, to shore up the inadequate defence, but Scunthorpe was relegated at the end of the 1967–68 season.

=== Crystal Palace ===
Blyth joined Crystal Palace in the summer of 1968 as an old-style wing-half, but he developed into a centre-back and immediately became a regular member of Palace's 1968–69 Second Division promotion-winning side. In their first ever match in the top-flight First Division, he scored Palace's first goal with a looping header against Manchester United. He scored another goal the following Saturday, against Everton.

As Palace struggled in the First Division, regularly finishing just above the relegation zone, Blyth became a permanent fixture in the defence alongside John McCormick. He was replaced as centre-back for a while by Roger Hynd, but after playing in midfield for much of the 1969–70 season he won his place back when Hynd was temporarily switched to the forward line – the contrasting styles of Blyth and McCormick made for a good mix, and the two of them stayed together until McCormick moved to Wealdstone in 1973.

On 2 September 1972, Blyth made a tackle on Newcastle United's Tony Green which ultimately ended Green's career, although Green later said that he felt any contact was accidental.

Palace eventually lost its fight to avoid relegation at the end of the 1972–73 season, under manager Malcolm Allison. The following season, Palace was relegated to Division 3.

=== Southampton ===
Southampton paid £60,000 for Mel Blyth in September 1974 – he was one of Lawrie McMenemy's first "over-30 signings". Blyth's impact in his first season at The Dell was such that he was voted the supporters' player of the year.

His effective partnership with Jim Steele was the mainstay of Saints' victorious FA Cup run of 1976, including beating his former club, Crystal Palace, in the semi-final. On 14 August 1976, Blyth was forced off with a hamstring injury during a 1–0 defeat to Liverpool in the FA Charity Shield.

By the end of the 1976–77 season, six of the twelve players from Southampton's Cup-winning side had left the club; Blyth was the seventh after he had argued with McMenemy about breaking up the team too quickly. The arrival of Chris Nicholl in 1977 signalled the end of Blyth's time on the south coast. In total, he made 135 appearances for Southampton, scoring seven goals.

==== Crystal Palace (loan) ====
Blyth re-appeared in Palace's colours in November 1977 when Terry Venables signed him on loan, after Ian Evans, who had replaced him in 1974, had broken his leg.

=== Cape Town City and Margate ===
In the 1978 close season he played for Cape Town City, then managed by former Palace coach, Frank Lord. At Cape Town, he played alongside Mick Channon and Kevin Keegan. In the summer of 1978, he returned to England and joined non-league Margate.

=== Millwall ===
In November 1978, he returned to the Football League and signed for Millwall, where he made a further 75 appearances. During his spell at the club, they were relegated from the Second Division. On one occasion whilst at Millwall Blyth was cautioned on the pitch by an Essex police officer for swearing at his own goalkeeper whilst playing away at Colchester United, the officer in question believed the language could incite violence from the crowd.

=== Later career ===
He later played for Houston Hurricane, before a spell in 1981 in Hong Kong with Bulova alongside Charlie George and Barry Daines. After falling out with the manager, Ron Wylie, Mel returned to England, ending his career at non-league Andover.

== After football ==
Although he was an electrician by trade, Blyth later became a driving instructor but, by November 1990, he was running his own building firm in south London. In 2003, he was a director of a building company and also a part-time coach in Crystal Palace's schoolboy academy. He later acquired a match-day role with the PFA.

On 13 January 2024, it was announced Blyth had died at the age of 79.

== Honours ==
Southampton

- FA Cup: 1975–76
