= Tony Knapp =

English footballer (1936–2023)

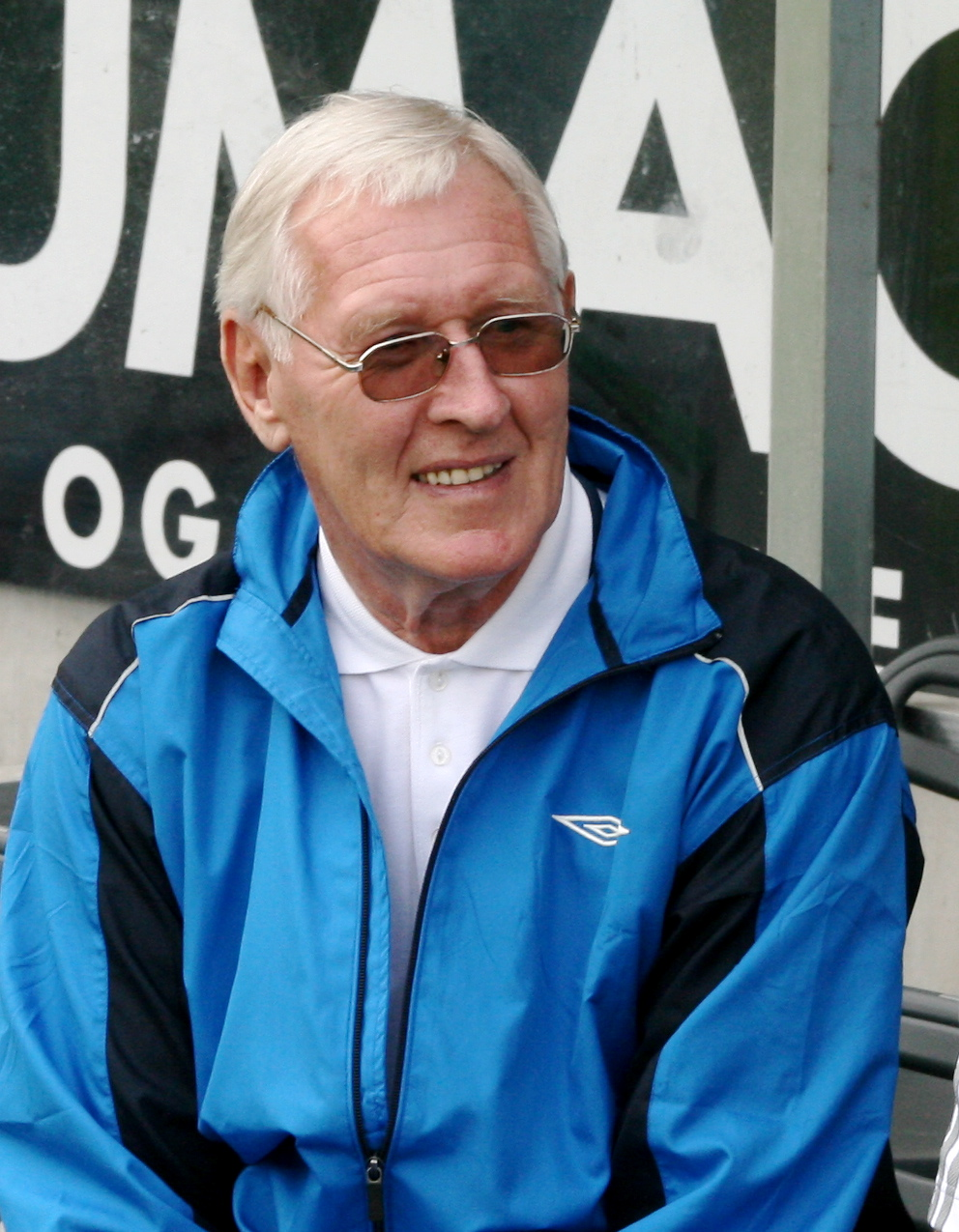
- Knapp at Viking Stadion in 2008

Personal information
- Full name: Anthony Knapp
- Date of birth: 13 October 1936
- Place of birth: Newstead, England
- Date of death: 22 March 2023 (aged 86)
- Place of death: Jørpeland, Norway
- Position: Defender

Youth career
- Nottingham Forest

Senior career*
Years	Team	Apps	(Gls)
1955–1961	Leicester City	86	(0)
1961–1967	Southampton	233	(2)
1967–1968	Coventry City	11	(0)
1968	Los Angeles Wolves	30	(1)
1969–1971	Tranmere Rovers	36	(1)
1971–1972	Poole Town		

Managerial career
- 1971–1972: Poole Town
- 1974–1975: Knattspyrnufélag Reykjavíkur
- 1974–1977: Iceland
- 1978–1981: Viking FK
- 1982–1983: Fredrikstad FK
- 1984–1985: Iceland
- 1986–1987: SK Brann
- FK Vidar
- Djerv 1919
- Sandnes Ulf
- 2003: Staal Jørpeland
- Stavanger IF
- 2004–2005: Hundvåg FK
- 2007–2008: Lillesand IL
- * Club domestic league appearances and goals

Anthony Knapp (13 October 1936 – 22 March 2023) was an English football player and manager, who played as a defender in the English football league in the 1960s.

== Career ==
Knapp was born in Newstead, Nottinghamshire. He trained with Nottingham Forest before becoming professional, as a player for Leicester City (1955–61, 86 matches), Southampton (1961–67, 260 matches, 2 goals), Coventry City (1967–68, 11 matches), Los Angeles Wolves (1968) and Tranmere Rovers (1969–71, 36 matches, 1 goal).

His career as a manager started in Poole Town (1971–72, also player) and as an assistant coach to Norwich City. He then had success with the amateurs Iceland national team (1974–77, A, U18, U21) as in their beating East Germany 2–1 (1975). In Norway, he had success with Viking FK (1978–81, winning the double 1979), Fredrikstad FK (1982–83), again Iceland (1984–85), and SK Brann (1986–87, cupfinalist). Since then Knapp had coached several lower division clubs in Rogaland, such as FK Vidar, Djerv 1919, Sandnes Ulf, Staal Jørpeland (2003), Stavanger IF and Hundvåg FK (2004–05), as well as Lillesand IL (2007–08) in Aust-Agder, before he retired due to illness.

== Personal life and death ==
As of February 2020, Knapp was residing in Jørpeland in Norway with his wife and children.

Knapp died on 22 March 2023, at the age of 86.

== Honours ==
Southampton

- Football League Second Division runners-up: 1965–66
