= John Sydenham =

English footballer (born 1939)

Personal information
- Full name: John Sydenham
- Date of birth: 15 September 1939 (age 87)
- Place of birth: Southampton, England
- Height: 5 ft 6 in (1.68 m)
- Position: Striker

Youth career
- 1955–1957: CPC Sports

Senior career*
Years	Team	Apps	(Gls)
1957–1969	Southampton	342	(37)
1969–1971	Aldershot	59	(4)
1972–1974	Bath City	69	(9)
1974–????	Inglewood Kiev		
????–1981	Floreat Athena		

International career
- England youth
	England U23	2	(0)
- * Club domestic league appearances and goals

John Sydenham (born 15 September 1939) is an English former footballer who played as a striker, spending most of his career with Southampton.

== Early career ==
Born in Southampton, John was educated at St. Mary's College, Southampton and, at 13, he became their first pupil to play for the Southampton Schools XI. By playing his part in the side that reached the final of the 1954 English Schools trophy, only to lose out to Liverpool, he came to the notice of Saints. In August 1955 he joined CPC Sports which doubled as a Saints' nursery side.

In due course John became part of the successful 1956–57 Southampton Youth side which did so well in the FA Youth Cup. Saints lost out 7–5 to Manchester United on aggregate but Sydenham's lasting memory of the cup adventure was of Manchester United manager Matt Busby going into the Old Trafford dressing room and congratulating them on their performance. The young Saints' side had just won 3–2, becoming the first side to beat United in the Youth Cup, but the damage had already been done in front of a 20,000 crowd at The Dell where the Busby Babes had won the first leg 5–2.

== Southampton ==
Having been selected for England Youth five times, Sydenham joined Southampton as a professional in April 1957. He made his debut for the Southampton first team on 4 May 1957 at home to Newport County. At this time Sydenham first joined forces with another young winger, Terry Paine, and before long both players were regulars in Saints' first team, tearing Third Division defences to pieces.

He first received International honours in the 1959–60 season being twice selected for the England Under-23 team including against Scotland, which match ended 4–4. A young Denis Law netted all four goals for the Scots while Jimmy Greaves converted a hat-trick for the English.

Like most players at this time, his progress was interrupted by National Service in July 1960.

On his return to the club, he soon regained his place on the left-wing and played an important part in helping Southampton reach the First Division in 1966. By the time of Saints' arrival in the top flight wingers were dropping out of favour, and Sydenham was often not selected for away games in preference for an extra defender. He remained loyal to the club and on 16 August 1969, he enjoyed a spectacular afternoon at Old Trafford, when he laid on all four of Ron Davies' goals to set up a memorable 4–1 victory against Manchester United.

Terry Paine and John Sydenham are regarded by supporters as the club's finest pair of wingers during the 1960s.

Sydenham made 401 League and Cup appearances for the Saints, scoring 40 goals.

== Later career ==
Eventually, he was slowed by age and lost much of his effectiveness and, after a testimonial match against Portsmouth, in March 1970 he moved to Aldershot (under old team-mate Jimmy Melia), for whom he made 59 appearances before moving on to Bath City, managed by another ex-Saint David Burnside, for whom he played 77 games from July 1972.

He first went to Perth, Western Australia in 1974. He stayed just for the one year, but in that time faced Chelsea with the State side in May and won a Top-Four medal with Floreat Athena before jetting back to England. He was lured back to Western Australia in 1980 to take on a player-coaching role at the Greek-backed club Athena, where both Alan Ball and Ted MacDougall played for him, and succeeded in returning the side back into the State League as Second Division champions. Then in the mid-eighties, he coached Wanneroo City Soccer Club.

Today, with his wife Jean, he lives in Melbourne.

Since the demise of their academy in Australia, Sydenham is Saints' representative there, keeping a close eye on any talent coming through.
