= Denis Hollywood =

Scottish footballer

Personal information
- Full name: Denis Fallon Hollywood
- Date of birth: 3 November 1944 (age 81)
- Place of birth: Govan, Scotland
- Position: Left back

Senior career*
Years	Team	Apps	(Gls)
1962–1972	Southampton	234	(4)
- Bath City
- Basingstoke Town

International career
1965	Scotland U23	1	(0)
- * Club domestic league appearances and goals

Denis Fallen Hollywood (born 3 November 1944) is a Scottish former football full-back, who played most of his career for Southampton between 1961 and 1972, making a total of 267 appearances for the club.

One of 18 children, he had lived with his grandmother and migrated South to Essex with her aged 12, as a youngster he had trials at both Spurs and West Ham, however it was Saints who offered him an apprenticeship, the then new fangled way of signing youngsters.

He made his debut still a month short of his 18th birthday against Scunthorpe in the League Cup in October 1962 playing as a midfielder playing two further games in that position before the end of the season. In 1963–64 he was converted to full back and finished the season with 11 straight games. By 1966–67, Southampton's first season in the top flight, Hollywood was a regular first team player.

Denis was released by Southampton at the age of 27, and decided to hang up his boots after some part-time football with Bath City and Basingstoke Town. He went to work at the local docks and continued to live in his adopted home city.
