= Eric Martin (footballer, born 1946) =

Scottish footballer (born 1946)

Personal information
- Full name: Eric Martin
- Date of birth: 31 March 1946 (age 80)
- Place of birth: Perth, Scotland
- Height: 5 ft 11 in (1.80 m)
- Position: Goalkeeper

Youth career
- Blairhall Colliery

Senior career*
Years	Team	Apps	(Gls)
1963–1964	Cowdenbeath	1	(0)
1964–1967	Dunfermline Athletic	51	(0)
1967–1975	Southampton	248	(0)
1975–1979	Washington Diplomats	58	(0)
1975–1979	Washington Diplomats (indoor)		
Total		358+	(0)
- * Club domestic league appearances and goals

Eric Martin (born 31 March 1946) is a Scottish former professional footballer who played as a goalkeeper. He made 248 Football League appearances for Southampton between 1967 and 1975.

He also played both outdoor and indoors in the North American Soccer League for the Washington Diplomats from 1975 to 1979.
