= 1927–28 Southampton F.C. season =

English football club season

Southampton F.C.
1927–28 season
- Chairman: Wyndham Portal
- Manager: Arthur Chadwick
- Stadium: The Dell
- Second Division: 17th
- FA Cup: Third round
- Top goalscorer: League: Bill Rawlings (20); All: Bill Rawlings (21)
- Highest home attendance: 15,763 v West Bromwich Albion (9 April 1928)
- Lowest home attendance: 4,619 v Fulham (19 November 1927)
- Average home league attendance: 10,309
- Biggest win: 5–0 v Grimsby Town (4 February 1928); 6–1 v Barnsley (24 March 1928)
- Biggest defeat: 1–6 v Manchester City (28 April 1928)
Home colours

The 1927–28 season was the 33rd season of competitive football by Southampton, and the club's sixth in the Second Division of the Football League. The season was the club's worst in the division to date, as they finished in 17th place just two points above Fulham in the first relegation spot. After a poor start in which they lost their first four games of the campaign, the Saints continued to drop points against teams throughout the Second Division, remaining in the bottom six positions for most of the year. A number of wins in the second half of the season over fellow mid-table sides helped to offset notable losses against those aiming for promotion, ensuring that the club avoided returning down to the Third Division South. Southampton finished the season in 17th place with 14 wins, seven draws and 21 losses.

In the 1927–28 FA Cup, Southampton entered at the third round away to First Division side Cardiff City, who had beaten Arsenal to win the tournament the previous season. The game ended 2–1 to the Welsh side, with Bill Rawlings scoring a consolation goal for visitors as they were eliminated in their first fixture in the cup for the second time in three seasons. The club ended the season at Fratton Park for the Hampshire Benevolent Cup match against local rivals Portsmouth, who had just completed their first year as a top-flight side. Pompey thrashed the Saints 6–1, with Charlie Petrie scoring the sole goal for the visitors. Southampton also played five friendly matches during the season, losing to Bournemouth & Boscombe Athletic, Corinthian and Millwall, and drawing with Guildford City and Wimborne Town.

Southampton used 27 different players during the 1927–28 season and had twelve different goalscorers. Their top-scorer was centre-forward Bill Rawlings, in his final season with the club, who scored 20 goals in the Second Division and one in the FA Cup. Sam Taylor scored ten goals in the league, followed by Jimmy Bullock with eight league goals. Jerry Mackie, who joined the club in March 1928 after Rawlings left for Manchester United, scored six goals in his seven league appearances. Eight players were signed by the club during the campaign, with four released and sold to other clubs. The average attendance at The Dell during the 1927–28 season was 10,309. The highest attendance was 15,763 against West Bromwich Albion on 9 April 1928; the lowest was 4,619 against Fulham on 19 November 1927.

== Background and transfers ==
Southampton manager Arthur Chadwick signed several new players after the end of the 1926–27 season. The first addition was right-back James Ellison, who joined on amateur terms in May from Welsh club Rhyl United, before signing a professional contract in October. The following month the club signed half-back Jack Mitton from Wolverhampton Wanderers for £150, and inside-forward Charlie Petrie from Swindon Town. Five more players arrived at The Dell in August: wing-half Bill Luckett from Liverpool County Combination side Skelmersdale United, full-back Ted Robinson from Lancashire Combination side Chorley, inside-forward Tommy Taylor from Manchester City, goalkeeper George Thompson from Midland League club York City, and half-back Arthur Wilson from Scotswood.

During the summer, goalkeeper James Thitchener left the club for Peterborough-based side Celta Mills. Also departing the club were right-half Ernie King, who signed for Southern League side Guildford City, and inside-left Frank Matthews, who joined Third Division North club Chesterfield. Shortly before the end of the season, in March 1928, centre-forward Bill Rawlings left the club to join First Division side Manchester United for a new club record fee of £3,860. In a nine-year career at Southampton, Rawlings made a total of 377 appearances and scored 198 goals in all competitions, making him the club's top scorer at the time. To replace their top scorer, the Saints signed Jerry Mackie from local First Division rivals Portsmouth, who introduced himself by scoring a hat-trick on his debut.

Players transferred in

Name	Nationality	Pos.	Club	Date	Fee	Ref.
James Ellison	England	FB	(Wales) Rhyl United	May 1927	Free (Note: James Ellison initially joined on amateur terms in May 1927, before turning professional that October.)	
Jack Mitton	England	HB	(England) Wolverhampton Wanderers	June 1927	£150	
Charlie Petrie	England	FW	(England) Swindon Town	June 1927	Unknown	
Bill Luckett	England	HB	(England) Skelmersdale United	August 1927	Unknown	
Ted Robinson	England	FB	(England) Chorley	August 1927	Unknown	
Tommy Taylor	England	FW	(England) Manchester City	August 1927	Unknown	
George Thompson	England	GK	(England) York City	August 1927	Unknown	
Arthur Wilson	England	HB	(England) Scotswood	August 1927	Unknown	
Jerry Mackie	Scotland	FW	(England) Portsmouth	March 1928	Unknown	

Players transferred out

Name	Nationality	Pos.	Club	Date	Fee	Ref.
James Thitchener	England	GK	(England) Celta Mills	May 1927	Unknown	
Ernie King	England	HB	(England) Guildford City	June 1927	Unknown	
Frank Matthews	England	FW	(England) Chesterfield	June 1927	Unknown	
Bill Rawlings	England	FW	(England) Manchester United	March 1928	£3,860	

== Second Division ==
Southampton's campaign in the 1927–28 Football League Second Division started with four straight losses, combining with the defeat on the last day of the previous season to mark their joint longest run of losses in league football. The first game of the season was a 6–3 loss at home to Stoke City on 27 August 1927, who had been recently promoted to the Second Division as Third Division North champions. Bill Rawlings (twice) and Sam Taylor scored for the home side in the club's highest-scoring draw to date. The next three matches saw the Saints lose 2–0 away to Clapton Orient and Leeds United, and 3–1 in the return fixture against Orient at The Dell, leaving the team in 20th place in the Second Division table. A 5–2 win over Oldham Athletic and three draws saw Southampton move up three places in the standings to 17th by October, although by the next month they were back in close proximity to the relegation zone following defeats against Blackpool, Chelsea, Port Vale and South Shields.

The club continued to struggle throughout November and December, when they remained in the bottom six of the table facing the prospect of a battle against relegation. Fortunes began to turn in late January when the Saints beat Notts County 5–1 (in which debutant Bill Luckett scored twice), followed by a 5–0 defeat of Grimsby Town and 2–0 victories over Blackpool and Chelsea in February, all of which combined to help the side escape the bottom six for the first time during the campaign. The remaining fixtures of the season saw Southampton pick up enough wins to remain out of the relegation zone and therefore safe in the second flight. Notable games included a 6–1 victory over Barnsley in which new signing Jerry Mackie scored a hat-trick on his debut, and a 2–1 away win over promotion hopefuls Preston North End. The Saints finished the season in 17th place in the Second Division league table – their lowest position in their six seasons in the division to date – with 14 wins, seven draws and 21 losses.

=== List of match results ===
27 August 1927 1	Southampton	3–6	Stoke City	Southampton
	Rawlings; S. Taylor			Stadium: The Dell; Attendance: 12,000

29 August 1927 2	Clapton Orient	2–0	Southampton	London
				Stadium: Clapton Stadium; Attendance: 13,711

3 September 1927 3	Leeds United	2–0	Southampton	Leeds
				Stadium: Elland Road; Attendance: 20,000

5 September 1927 4	Southampton	1–3	Clapton Orient	Southampton
	Petrie			Stadium: The Dell; Attendance: 7,982

10 September 1927 5	Notts County	0–0	Southampton	Nottingham
				Stadium: Meadow Lane; Attendance: 10,000

17 September 1927 6	Southampton	5–2	Oldham Athletic	Southampton
	Rawlings; S. Taylor; Murphy			Stadium: The Dell; Attendance: 10,000

24 September 1927 7	Grimsby Town	2–2	Southampton	Cleethorpes
			S. Taylor	Stadium: Blundell Park; Attendance: 10,000

1 October 1927 8	Southampton	0–0	Reading	Southampton
				Stadium: The Dell; Attendance: 10,000

8 October 1927 9	Blackpool	1–0	Southampton	Blackpool
				Stadium: Bloomfield Road; Attendance: 12,000

15 October 1927 10	Southampton	2–4	Chelsea	Southampton
	Petrie			Stadium: The Dell; Attendance: 14,000

22 October 1927 11	Southampton	4–1	Wolverhampton Wanderers	Southampton
	Rowley; Rawlings			Stadium: The Dell; Attendance: 8,000

29 October 1927 12	Port Vale	4–0	Southampton	Hanley
				Stadium: Old Recreation Ground; Attendance: 9,000

5 November 1927 13	Southampton	3–5	South Shields	Southampton
	Rawlings; S. Taylor			Stadium: The Dell; Attendance: 8,000

12 November 1927 14	Barnsley	0–1	Southampton	Barnsley
			Rowley	Stadium: Oakwell; Attendance: 8,000

19 November 1927 15	Southampton	5–2	Fulham	Southampton
	Rawlings; Bradford; Rowley; Murphy			Stadium: The Dell; Attendance: 4,619

26 November 1927 16	Hull City	1–0	Southampton	Kingston upon Hull
				Stadium: Anlaby Road; Attendance: 10,000

3 December 1927 17	Southampton	0–0	Preston North End	Southampton
				Stadium: The Dell; Attendance: 10,000

10 December 1927 18	Swansea Town	2–0	Southampton	Swansea
				Stadium: Vetch Field; Attendance: 13,000

17 December 1927 19	Southampton	1–1	Manchester City	Southampton
	S. Taylor			Stadium: The Dell; Attendance: 12,000

24 December 1927 20	Nottingham Forest	1–1	Southampton	West Bridgford
			Rawlings	Stadium: City Ground; Attendance: 4,000

26 December 1927 21	Bristol City	3–0	Southampton	Bristol
				Stadium: Ashton Gate Stadium; Attendance: 17,072

27 December 1927 22	Southampton	3–2	Bristol City	Southampton
	Rawlings; Bullock			Stadium: The Dell; Attendance: 10,132

31 December 1927 23	Stoke City	2–1	Southampton	Stoke-on-Trent
			Own goal	Stadium: Victoria Ground; Attendance: 6,000

7 January 1928 24	Southampton	1–4	Leeds United	Southampton
	Murphy			Stadium: The Dell; Attendance: 14,000

21 January 1928 25	Southampton	5–1	Notts County	Southampton
	Luckett; Rawlings			Stadium: The Dell; Attendance: 10,000

31 January 1928 26	Oldham Athletic	3–1	Southampton	Oldham
			Bullock	Stadium: Boundary Park; Attendance: 6,365

4 February 1928 27	Southampton	5–0	Grimsby Town	Southampton
	S. Taylor; Rawlings; Bullock; Murphy			Stadium: The Dell; Attendance: 8,000

11 February 1928 28	Reading	0–0	Southampton	Reading
				Stadium: Elm Park; Attendance: 8,000

18 February 1928 29	Southampton	2–0	Blackpool	Southampton
	Rawlings; Bullock			Stadium: The Dell; Attendance: 12,000

25 February 1928 30	Chelsea	0–2	Southampton	London
			Rawlings	Stadium: Stamford Bridge; Attendance: 40,000

3 March 1928 31	Wolverhampton Wanderers	2–1	Southampton	Wolverhampton
			Rawlings	Stadium: Molineux Stadium; Attendance: 13,000

10 March 1928 32	Southampton	1–3	Port Vale	Southampton
	S. Taylor			Stadium: The Dell; Attendance: 10,000

17 March 1928 33	South Shields	2–1	Southampton	South Shields
			Bullock	Stadium: Horsley Hill; Attendance: 3,000

24 March 1928 34	Southampton	6–1	Barnsley	Southampton
	Mackie; Woodhouse; Petrie; Cribb			Stadium: The Dell; Attendance: 11,000

31 March 1928 35	Fulham	1–0	Southampton	London
				Stadium: Craven Cottage; Attendance: 7,000

7 April 1928 36	Southampton	2–0	Hull City	Southampton
	Mackie; Cribb			Stadium: The Dell; Attendance: 11,000

9 April 1928 37	Southampton	3–2	West Bromwich Albion	Southampton
	Mackie; Bullock; Cribb			Stadium: The Dell; Attendance: 15,763

10 April 1928 38	West Bromwich Albion	2–1	Southampton	West Bromwich
			Bullock	Stadium: The Hawthorns; Attendance: 10,000

14 April 1928 39	Preston North End	1–2	Southampton	Preston
			Mackie; Petrie	Stadium: Deepdale; Attendance: 10,000

21 April 1928 40	Southampton	0–2	Swansea Town	Southampton
				Stadium: The Dell; Attendance: 8,000

28 April 1928 41	Manchester City	6–1	Southampton	Manchester
			T. Taylor	Stadium: Maine Road; Attendance: 40,000

5 May 1928 42	Southampton	2–1	Nottingham Forest	Southampton
	Rowley; T. Taylor			Stadium: The Dell; Attendance: 10,000

=== Final league table ===
Pos	Team	Pld	W	D	L	GF	GA	GAv	Pts
15	Notts County	42	13	12	17	68	74	0.919	38
16	Wolverhampton Wanderers	42	13	10	19	63	91	0.692	36
17	Southampton	42	14	7	21	68	77	0.883	35
18	Reading	42	11	13	18	53	75	0.707	35
19	Blackpool	42	13	8	21	83	101	0.822	34

=== Results by matchday ===
Round	1	2	3	4	5	6	7	8	9	10	11	12	13	14	15	16	17	18	19	20	21	22	23	24	25	26	27	28	29	30	31	32	33	34	35	36	37	38	39	40	41	42
Ground	H	A	A	H	A	H	A	H	A	H	H	A	H	A	H	A	H	A	H	A	A	H	A	H	H	A	H	A	H	A	A	H	A	H	A	H	H	A	A	H	A	H
Result	L	L	L	L	D	W	D	D	L	L	W	L	L	W	W	L	D	L	D	D	L	W	L	L	W	L	W	D	W	W	L	L	L	W	L	W	W	L	W	L	L	W
Position	18	20	20	20	19	17	18	17	18	19	18	19	20	19	18	19	17	18	18	19	20	18	18	20	18	19	17	18	16	16	17	18	18	17	19	18	16	17	15	18	18	17

Source: 11v11.com
A = Away; H = Home; W = Win; D = Draw; L = Loss

== FA Cup ==
Southampton entered the 1927–28 FA Cup in the third round against defending champions Cardiff City, who had beaten Southampton's semi-final opponents Arsenal in the final the previous year. The meeting took place on 14 January 1928 at Ninian Park, marking the first time the Saints had been drawn into the tournament away from home since the 1923–24 season. The Second Division side put up "a good show", but lost 2–1 to the top-flight Bluebirds. Bill Rawlings scored the only goal for the visitors, which marked his final cup goal for the club before leaving in March.

14 January 1928 Round 3	Cardiff City	2–1	Southampton	Cardiff
			Rawlings	Stadium: Ninian Park; Attendance: 20,000

== Other matches ==
Outside of the league and the FA Cup, Southampton played six additional first-team matches during the 1927–28 season. The first was a friendly match against local side Bournemouth & Boscombe Athletic on 28 September 1927, which they lost 3–1. In January the Saints travelled to face amateur club Corinthian, who thrashed them 5–0. Two away friendlies in April ended in draws: Arthur Wilson scored twice alongside Bert Shelley in a 3–3 draw against Southern League side Guildford City, and a week later a 2–2 draw with Dorset League side Wimborne Town included goals from Fred Lohse and Shelley. A final friendly took place against Millwall at The Dell on 2 May. A benefit for Michael Keeping and Ted Hough, it ended in a 2–1 win for the visitors, with Southampton's consolation scored by Jim Swinden.

Five days after the loss to Millwall, Southampton ended their season at Fratton Park with the annual Hampshire Benevolent Cup fixture against local rivals Portsmouth. The home side took the lead in the first minute through a header from Jack Weddle, with a Bobby Irvine volley doubling their advantage and Dave Watson adding a third before half-time. After Weddle scored a second and third goal after the break, Charlie Petrie pulled one back for the travelling Saints, although the Pompey forward later scored his fourth and his side's sixth to secure a 6–1 victory. For the first time since its introduction in the 1922–23 season, the Rowland Hospital Cup was not contested between the sides in 1927–28, with a local newspaper explaining that "Southampton could not find it convenient to field a team" for the fixture.

28 September 1927 Friendly	Bournemouth & Boscombe Athletic	3–1	Southampton	Bournemouth
			Rawlings	Stadium: Dean Court

28 January 1928 Friendly	Corinthian	5–0	Southampton	London
				Stadium: The Crystal Palace

23 April 1928 Friendly	Guildford City	3–3	Southampton	Guildford
	Wilson; Shelley			Stadium: Joseph's Road

30 April 1928 Friendly	Wimborne Town	2–2	Southampton	Wimborne Minster
	Lohse; Shelley			Stadium: The Cuthbury

2 May 1928 Friendly	Southampton	1–2	Millwall	Southampton
	Swinden			Stadium: The Dell

7 May 1928 Hampshire BC	Portsmouth	6–1	Southampton	Portsmouth
	Weddle; Irvine; Watson		Petrie	Stadium: Fratton Park; Attendance: 3,000; Referee: W. E. Stone

== Player details ==
Southampton used 27 different players during the 1927–28 season, twelve of whom scored during the campaign. The team played in a 2–3–5 formation throughout the campaign, using two full-backs, three half-backs, two outside forwards, two inside forwards and a centre-forward. Half-back and captain George Harkus made the most appearances during the season, playing in all but one league match. Arthur Bradford and Stan Woodhouse appeared in all but six games in the league. Centre-forward Bill Rawlings finished as the season's top scorer with 20 goals in the Second Division and one in the FA Cup. Jimmy Bullock was the second-highest scorer of the season, with eight goals in 17 league appearances. The highest-scoring half-back of the season was new signing Bill Luckett, who scored twice in the league.

=== Squad statistics ===
Name	Pos.	Nat.	League		FA Cup		Hampshire BC		Total	
Name	Pos.	Nat.	Apps.	Gls.	Apps.	Gls.	Apps.	Gls.	Apps.	Gls.
Bill Adams	HB	(England)	1	0	0	0	0	0	1	0
Tommy Allen	GK	(England)	32	0	1	0	0	0	33	0
Arthur Bradford	HB	(England)	36	1	1	0	1	0	38	1
Jimmy Bullock	FW	(England)	17	8	1	0	0	0	18	8
Cuthbert Coundon	FW	(England)	15	0	0	0	0	0	15	0
Stan Cribb	FW	(England)	10	3	0	0	0	0	10	3
James Ellison	HB	(England)	1	0	0	0	0	0	1	0
George Harkus	HB	(England)	41	0	1	0	1	0	43	0
Bill Henderson	FW	(England)	23	0	0	0	0	0	23	0
Ted Hough	FB	(England)	25	0	0	0	0	0	25	0
Michael Keeping	FB	(England)	28	0	1	0	1	0	30	0
Bill Luckett	HB	(England)	6	2	1	0	1	0	8	2
Jerry Mackie	FW	(Scotland)	7	6	0	0	0	0	7	6
Jack Mitton	HB	(England)	8	0	0	0	0	0	8	0
Billy Murphy	FW	(England)	29	4	1	0	0	0	30	4
A. Newman (Note: Players named "A. Newman" and "Prince" are listed in the lineup for the Hampshire Benevolent Cup match, however no first names are given.)	FW	(England)	0	0	0	0	1	0	1	0
Charlie Petrie	FW	(England)	15	5	0	0	1	1	16	6
Prince	FW	(England)	0	0	0	0	1	0	1	0
Ted Robinson	FB	(England)	1	0	0	0	0	0	1	0
Dick Rowley	FW	(Republic of Ireland)	20	5	0	0	0	0	20	5
Bert Shelley	HB	(England)	33	0	0	0	1	0	34	0
Jim Swinden	FW	(England)	2	0	0	0	0	0	2	0
Sam Taylor	FW	(England)	30	10	1	0	0	0	31	10
Tommy Taylor	FW	(England)	4	2	0	0	1	0	5	2
George Thompson	GK	(England)	10	0	0	0	1	0	11	0
Stan Woodhouse	HB	(England)	36	1	1	0	1	0	38	1
Players with appearances who left before the end of the season
Bill Rawlings	FW	(England)	32	20	1	1	0	0	33	21

=== Most appearances ===
Rank	Name	Pos.	League		FA Cup		Other		Total	
Rank	Name	Pos.	Apps.	%	Apps.	%	Apps.	%	Apps.	%
1	George Harkus	HB	41	97.62	1	100.00	1	100.00	43	97.73
2	Arthur Bradford	HB	36	85.71	1	100.00	1	100.00	38	86.36
2	Stan Woodhouse	HB	36	85.71	1	100.00	1	100.00	38	86.36
4	Bert Shelley	HB	33	78.57	0	0.00	1	100.00	34	77.27
5	Tommy Allen	GK	32	76.19	1	100.00	0	0.00	33	75.00
5	Bill Rawlings	FW	32	76.19	1	100.00	0	0.00	33	75.00
7	Sam Taylor	FW	30	71.43	1	100.00	0	0.00	31	70.45
8	Billy Murphy	FW	29	69.05	1	100.00	0	0.00	30	68.18
8	Michael Keeping	FB	28	66.67	1	100.00	1	100.00	30	68.18
10	Ted Hough	FB	25	59.52	0	0.00	0	0.00	25	56.82

=== Top goalscorers ===
Rank	Name	Pos.	League		FA Cup		Other		Total	
Rank	Name	Pos.	Gls.	GPG	Gls.	GPG	Gls.	GPG	Gls.	GPG
1	Bill Rawlings	FW	20	0.62	1	1.00	0	0.00	21	0.63
2	Sam Taylor	FW	10	0.33	0	0.00	0	0.00	10	0.32
3	Jimmy Bullock	FW	8	0.47	0	0.00	0	0.00	8	0.44
4	Jerry Mackie	FW	6	0.85	0	0.00	0	0.00	6	0.85
4	Charlie Petrie	FW	5	0.33	0	0.00	1	1.00	6	0.37
6	Dick Rowley	FW	5	0.25	0	0.00	0	0.00	5	0.25
7	Billy Murphy	FW	4	0.13	0	0.00	0	0.00	4	0.13
8	Stan Cribb	FW	3	0.30	0	0.00	0	0.00	3	0.30
9	Tommy Taylor	FW	2	0.50	0	0.00	0	0.00	2	0.40
9	Bill Luckett	HB	2	0.33	0	0.00	0	0.00	2	0.25

== Bibliography ==
- Chalk, Gary; Holley, Duncan (10 August 1987), A Complete Record of Southampton Football Club: 1885–1987, Derby, England: Breedon Books, ISBN 978-0907969228
- Chalk, Gary; Holley, Duncan; Bull, David (28 November 2013), All the Saints: A Complete Who's Who of Southampton FC, Bristol, England: Hagiology Publishing, ISBN 978-0992686406
- Juson, Dave; Aldworth, Clay; Bendel, Barry; Bull, David; Chalk, Gary (10 November 2004), Saints v Pompey: A History of Unrelenting Rivalry, Bristol, England: Hagiology Publishing, ISBN 978-0953447459
