= 1926–27 Southampton F.C. season =

English football club season

Southampton F.C.
1926–27 season
- Chairman: Wyndham Portal
- Manager: Arthur Chadwick
- Stadium: The Dell
- Second Division: 13th
- FA Cup: Semi-finals
- Top goalscorer: League: Bill Rawlings (23); All: Bill Rawlings (28)
- Highest home attendance: League: 19,120 v Notts County (27 December 1936); Overall: 21,408 v Newcastle United (19 February 1927)
- Lowest home attendance: 5,368 v Chelsea (4 April 1927)
- Average home league attendance: 9,728
- Biggest win: 6–2 v South Shields (12 February 1927)
- Biggest defeat: 1–5 v Barnsley (7 May 1927)
Home colours

The 1926–27 season was the 32nd season of competitive football by Southampton, and the club's fifth in the Second Division of the Football League. After having their worst year in the division the previous season, Southampton began the 1926–27 league campaign in strong fashion and found themselves in amongst the promotion hopefuls by the end of the year, just two points off front-runners Middlesbrough. However, following a lengthy run in the FA Cup the club's form began to deteriorate, ending with a series of 13 games which included just one win. The Saints dropped from as high as the top six of the Second Division table to a mid-table position, ending the season in 13th place with 15 wins, 12 draws and 15 losses – just one position and four points higher than their 14th-place finish the previous season.

In the 1926–27 FA Cup, Southampton beat Third Division South side Norwich City in the third round, First Division clubs Birmingham and Newcastle United in the fourth and fifth rounds, respectively, and Third Division South side Millwall in the quarter-finals. They then faced top-flight side Arsenal in the semi-finals, who beat them 2–1 to advance to the final of the cup (they finished as runners-up). As usual, the club ended the season with the Hampshire Benevolent Cup and Rowland Hospital Cup fixtures against local rivals Portsmouth. Southampton won the former 4–1, while Pompey won the latter 5–1. The Saints also played four friendly matches during the campaign, beating Aldershot Command 4–0 and Bournemouth & Boscombe Athletic 1–0, drawing 1–1 with Exeter City, and losing 3–2 to Guildford United.

Southampton used 22 different players during the 1926–27 season and had eleven different goalscorers. The club's top scorer was centre-forward Bill Rawlings, who scored 23 times in the league, five times in the FA Cup and twice in the Hampshire Benevolent Cup for a total of 30 goals. Irish inside-forward Dick Rowley, in his first season with the club after joining from Swindon Town in the summer, scored 20 goals across the same three competitions. Four new players were signed by the club during the campaign, with ten released and sold to other clubs. The average attendance at The Dell during the 1926–27 season was 9,728. The highest attendance was 21,408 against Newcastle United in the FA Cup fifth round on 19 February 1927; the lowest was 5,368 against Chelsea in the league on 4 April 1927.

== Background and transfers ==
Following the end of the 1925–26 season, Southampton underwent several major changes in playing personnel. The most significant was the departure of inside-right Arthur Dominy to join First Division club Everton, who had reportedly been trying to sign him since as early as 1920. In a 13-year career at The Dell which began before the First World War, Dominy made a total of 392 appearances for the Saints and scored 155 goals, which at the time placed him second on the club's list of all-time appearances and third on the club's list of top goalscorers. He was replaced in the team by Sam Taylor, who joined from Mansfield Town in June 1926 for a club record fee of £950. Taylor soon switched to the left side, with fellow new arrival Dick Rowley taking over for the rest of the season after joining from Swindon Town. Alf Bishop and Billy Murphy signed in August, from St Albans City and Manchester City, respectively. Bishop remained only until January, when his contract was cancelled and he left to join Wellington Town.

In addition to Dominy, eight more players left Southampton in the summer of 1926. Half-back Alec Campbell left the club for the third and final time in his career to join Southern League club Poole, Scottish winger Jimmy Carr signed for fellow Second Division side Swansea Town in May, centre-forward Les Bruton joined Peterborough & Fletton United of the Southern League in June, goalkeeper Len Hill left for Third Division North side Rochdale after just one season at The Dell, out-of-favour inside-forward Cliff Price remained in the Second Division with Nottingham Forest, and winger Sammy Meston joined Third Division South side Gillingham in August. At the end of the 1925–26 season, inside-forward Ernest Turner temporarily retired from football and relocated to Canada, before returning to sign for Luton Town at the end of the year. Goalkeeper Harry Yeomans also left the club and retired from football altogether, joining the Southampton police force after less than four years as a professional player.

Players transferred in

Name	Nationality	Pos.	Club	Date	Fee	Ref.
Dick Rowley	Ireland	FW	(England) Swindon Town	May 1926	Free (Note: Dick Rowley initially joined on amateur terms in May 1926, before turning professional that November.)	
Sam Taylor	England	FW	(England) Mansfield Town	June 1926	£950	
Alf Bishop	England	FW	(England) St Albans City	August 1926	Free	
Billy Murphy	England	FW	(England) Manchester City	August 1926	Unknown	

Players transferred out

Name	Nationality	Pos.	Club	Date	Fee	Ref.
Jimmy Carr	Scotland	FW	(Wales) Swansea Town	May 1926	Unknown	
Arthur Dominy	England	FW	(England) Everton	May 1926	Free	
Les Bruton	England	FW	(England) Peterborough & Fletton United	June 1926	Unknown	
Len Hill	England	GK	(England) Rochdale	June 1926	Unknown	
Cliff Price	England	FW	(England) Nottingham Forest	June 1926	Unknown	
Alec Campbell	England	HB	(England) Poole	July 1926	Unknown	
Sammy Meston	England	FW	(England) Gillingham	August 1926	Unknown	

Players released

Name	Nationality	Pos.	Date	Subsequent club	Ref.
Ernest Turner	Wales	FW	May 1926	(England) Luton Town	
Alf Bishop	England	FW	January 1927	(England) Wellington Town	

Players retired

Name	Nationality	Pos.	Date	Reason	Ref.
Harry Yeomans	England	GK	May 1926	Joined the Southampton police force	

== Second Division ==
Southampton began their 1926–27 league campaign at Fratton Park against local rivals Portsmouth, who had finished two places above the Saints in the Second Division table the previous season. The home side took the lead after 21 minutes through Willie Haines, who scored again in the second half after Sam Taylor had equalised with a goal on his debut before the break. New signing Murdoch McKenzie also scored a debut goal late on to secure a 3–1 win for Pompey, sending them to the top of the league table. Southampton's season picked up quickly after this opening loss, as they embarked on a short run of six games without a loss, including wins over mid-table sides Middlesbrough and Gateshead, and promotion hopefuls Chelsea, the latter of which included Bill Rawlings scoring his first hat-trick since the penultimate game of the 1923–24 season. After the first seven games of the season the club were eighth in the table, the highest position they had held in the division since finishing seventh in 1924–25.

Two more losses followed at the hands of Port Vale and Hull City, before the Saints went on another unbeaten run of seven games starting with a 2–2 draw at Wolverhampton Wanderers. During this period, the club beat recently relegated Manchester City 4–3 at Maine Road, as well as picking up home victories over mid-table Fulham 4–1 and promotion hopefuls Blackpool 5–3; in the latter two games, Rawlings scored his second and third hat-tricks of the campaign to bring his running total up to 15 goals. The three goals scored against Blackpool on 20 November marked the last time Rawlings would score a hat-trick for the club. By late November, the team had reached sixth place in the Second Division league table – the highest they had been since finishing fifth in 1923–24. Two losses and a draw were followed by three more wins in December (one over Barnsley and two over Notts County, recently relegated from the First Division), ensuring that the club remained in the top six moving into the new year.

1927 started off extremely poorly for Southampton in the Second Division. Despite their ongoing success in the FA Cup, the club lost four league games in a row between 1 January and 5 February, failing to score a single goal in defeats against Reading (1–0), Portsmouth (2–0), Bradford City (2–0) and Preston North End (1–0). Still occupying a place in the top ten of the league table, the Saints bounced back to beat South Shields 6–2 in their next fixture, with two goals each for Rawlings and Dick Rowley, and one each for Bill Henderson and Sam Taylor. This was followed by two 1–0 wins over Wolverhampton Wanderers and Darlington, both of whom were struggling in the bottom six of the table. After this, Southampton went on a run of eleven games without a win, including losses at the hands of clubs like Clapton Orient and Fulham who were fighting relegation. Following one more win and a 5–1 defeat at Barnsley, Southampton finished the season in 13th place with 15 wins, 12 draws and 15 losses.

=== List of match results ===
28 August 1926 1	Portsmouth	3–1	Southampton	Portsmouth
	Haines 21', 64'; McKenzie 75'		Taylor 40'	Stadium: Fratton Park; Attendance: 29,896

30 August 1926 2	Southampton	2–1	Middlesbrough	Southampton
	Henderson			Stadium: The Dell; Attendance: 10,000

4 September 1926 3	Southampton	0–0	Bradford City	Southampton
				Stadium: The Dell; Attendance: 10,000

11 September 1926 4	Chelsea	2–3	Southampton	London
			Rawlings	Stadium: Stamford Bridge; Attendance: 30,000

13 September 1926 5	Southampton	2–2	Port Vale	Southampton
	Keeping; Shelley			Stadium: The Dell; Attendance: 9,000

18 September 1926 6	Southampton	1–1	Preston North End	Southampton
	Rawlings			Stadium: The Dell; Attendance: 9,000

25 September 1926 7	South Shields	1–2	Southampton	South Shields
			Matthews; Murphy	Stadium: Horsley Hill; Attendance: 4,000

27 September 1926 8	Port Vale	3–1	Southampton	Hanley
			Rawlings	Stadium: Old Recreation Ground; Attendance: 9,594

2 October 1926 9	Southampton	0–1	Hull City	Southampton
				Stadium: The Dell; Attendance: 9,000

9 October 1926 10	Wolverhampton Wanderers	2–2	Southampton	Wolverhampton
			Henderson; Taylor	Stadium: Molineux Stadium; Attendance: 11,705

16 October 1926 11	Manchester City	3–4	Southampton	Manchester
			Rawlings; Rowley; Taylor	Stadium: Maine Road; Attendance: 30,000

23 October 1926 12	Southampton	3–1	Darlington	Southampton
	Rowley; Rawlings; Taylor			Stadium: The Dell; Attendance: 9,000

30 October 1926 13	Oldham Athletic	1–1	Southampton	Oldham
			Harkus	Stadium: Boundary Park; Attendance: 18,000

6 November 1926 14	Southampton	4–1	Fulham	Southampton
	Rawlings; Rowley			Stadium: The Dell; Attendance: 7,000

13 November 1926 15	Grimsby Town	0–1	Southampton	Cleethorpes
			Rawlings	Stadium: Blundell Park; Attendance: 8,000

20 November 1926 16	Southampton	5–3	Blackpool	Southampton
	Rawlings; Murphy			Stadium: The Dell; Attendance: 10,000

27 November 1926 17	Middlesbrough	3–1	Southampton	Middlesbrough
			Rowley	Stadium: Ayresome Park; Attendance: 15,000

4 December 1926 18	Southampton	1–1	Swansea Town	Southampton
	Rawlings			Stadium: The Dell; Attendance: 16,759

11 December 1926 19	Nottingham Forest	3–1	Southampton	West Bridgford
			Murphy	Stadium: City Ground; Attendance: 10,000

18 December 1926 20	Southampton	3–1	Barnsley	Southampton
	Henderson; Rowley; Own goal			Stadium: The Dell; Attendance: 6,000

25 December 1926 21	Notts County	0–1	Southampton	Nottingham
			Rawlings	Stadium: Meadow Lane; Attendance: 12,000

27 December 1926 22	Southampton	2–0	Notts County	Southampton
	Shelley; Rawlings			Stadium: The Dell; Attendance: 19,120

1 January 1927 23	Reading	1–0	Southampton	Reading
				Stadium: Elm Park; Attendance: 20,000

15 January 1927 24	Southampton	0–2	Portsmouth	Southampton
				Stadium: The Dell; Attendance: 19,058

22 January 1927 25	Bradford City	2–0	Southampton	Bradford
				Stadium: Valley Parade; Attendance: 10,000

5 February 1927 26	Preston North End	1–0	Southampton	Preston
				Stadium: Deepdale; Attendance: 14,000

12 February 1927 27	Southampton	6–2	South Shields	Southampton
	Rowley; Rawlings; Henderson; Taylor			Stadium: The Dell; Attendance: 8,000

26 February 1927 28	Southampton	1–0	Wolverhampton Wanderers	Southampton
	Rowley			Stadium: The Dell; Attendance: 6,000

12 March 1927 29	Darlington	1–2	Southampton	Darlington
			Rowley; Taylor	Stadium: Feethams; Attendance: 9,000

14 March 1927 30	Hull City	0–0	Southampton	Kingston upon Hull
				Stadium: Anlaby Road; Attendance: 6,000

19 March 1927 31	Southampton	0–1	Oldham Athletic	Southampton
				Stadium: The Dell; Attendance: 10,000

28 March 1927 32	Fulham	3–0	Southampton	London
				Stadium: Craven Cottage; Attendance: 7,792

2 April 1927 33	Southampton	0–0	Grimsby Town	Southampton
				Stadium: The Dell; Attendance: 6,000

4 April 1927 34	Southampton	1–1	Chelsea	Southampton
	Rowley			Stadium: The Dell; Attendance: 5,368

9 April 1927 35	Blackpool	3–2	Southampton	Blackpool
			Rowley; Rawlings	Stadium: Bloomfield Road; Attendance: 7,000

15 April 1927 36	Clapton Orient	1–0	Southampton	London
				Stadium: Clapton Stadium; Attendance: 13,848

16 April 1927 37	Southampton	1–1	Reading	Southampton
	Bullock			Stadium: The Dell; Attendance: 12,000

18 April 1927 38	Southampton	1–2	Clapton Orient	Southampton
	Rowley			Stadium: The Dell; Attendance: 8,000

23 April 1927 39	Swansea Town	2–2	Southampton	Swansea
			Henderson; Taylor	Stadium: Vetch Field; Attendance: 6,000

25 April 1927 40	Southampton	1–1	Manchester City	Southampton
	Rawlings			Stadium: The Dell; Attendance: 8,000

30 April 1927 41	Southampton	1–0	Nottingham Forest	Southampton
	Rowley			Stadium: The Dell; Attendance: 7,000

7 May 1927 42	Barnsley	5–1	Southampton	Barnsley
			Rawlings	Stadium: Oakwell; Attendance: 8,000

=== Final league table ===
Pos	Team	Pld	W	D	L	GF	GA	GAv	Pts
11	Barnsley	42	17	9	16	88	87	1.011	43
12	Swansea Town	42	16	11	15	68	72	0.944	43
13	Southampton	42	15	12	15	60	62	0.968	42
14	Reading	42	16	8	18	64	72	0.889	40
15	Wolverhampton Wanderers	42	14	7	21	73	75	0.973	35

=== Results by matchday ===
Round	1	2	3	4	5	6	7	8	9	10	11	12	13	14	15	16	17	18	19	20	21	22	23	24	25	26	27	28	29	30	31	32	33	34	35	36	37	38	39	40	41	42
Ground	A	H	H	A	H	H	A	A	H	A	A	H	A	H	A	H	A	H	A	H	A	H	A	H	A	A	H	H	A	A	H	A	H	H	A	A	H	H	A	H	H	A
Result	L	W	D	W	D	D	W	L	L	D	W	W	D	W	W	W	L	D	L	W	W	W	L	L	L	L	W	W	W	D	L	L	D	D	L	L	D	L	D	D	W	L
Position	16	15	11	9	8	10	8	8	12	11	10	8	9	7	6	6	8	8	9	8	7	6	7	8	9	9	9	9	9	8	8	9	10	9	10	11	11	11	13	11	11	13

Source: 11v11.com
A = Away; H = Home; W = Win; D = Draw; L = Loss

== FA Cup ==
Southampton entered the 1926–27 FA Cup in the third round against Third Division South club Norwich City, who they beat 3–0 at The Dell thanks to a brace from Dick Rowley and a penalty from Michael Keeping. The fourth round was another home tie for the Saints, this time against First Division side Birmingham. The lower league team beat the Blues comfortably, winning 4–1 thanks to goals from Rowley, Bill Rawlings (two) and George Harkus; Birmingham's England international centre-forward Joe Bradford saw a penalty during the match saved by Tommy Allen. A tenth consecutive home fixture in the competition for the fifth round saw Southampton host another First Division side, Newcastle United, who were then top of the league table. The Magpies initially took the lead through a Tommy McDonald penalty following a handball by Keeping, but a second brace in three cup games for Rowley, as well as some "resolute defending", saw off the soon-to-be English Football League champions.

In the quarter-finals, Southampton travelled to The Den to face Third Division South club Millwall on 5 March. The game ended in a goalless draw, forcing a replay at The Dell four days later which the Saints won, thanks to Rawlings' second brace in the competition. Wilf Phillips missed a penalty during the game for the hosts. In their second FA Cup semi-final in three years, the club faced First Division side Arsenal at Stamford Bridge, the home of Chelsea. The Gunners took the lead following an own goal by Saints right-back Ted Hough, and doubled their lead later through Charlie Buchan. Rawlings pulled one back for the Second Division side late on, before the game was shrouded in controversy. According to Southampton director A. A. Wood, the team were denied three penalties in the final minutes of the game. In the words of one London-based newspaper, there was at least one "palpable" penalty ignored by the referee which "robbed" Southampton of their first place in an FA Cup final in 25 years.

8 January 1927 Round 3	Southampton	3–0	Norwich City	Southampton
	Rowley; Keeping (pen.)			Stadium: The Dell; Attendance: 15,587

29 January 1927 Round 4	Southampton	4–1	Birmingham	Southampton
	Rowley; Rawlings; Harkus			Stadium: The Dell; Attendance: 15,804

19 February 1927 Round 5	Southampton	2–1	Newcastle United	Southampton
	Rowley		McDonald (pen.)	Stadium: The Dell; Attendance: 21,408

5 March 1927 Round 6	Millwall	0–0	Southampton	London
				Stadium: The Den; Attendance: 40,000

9 March 1927 Round 6 Replay	Southampton	2–0	Millwall	Southampton
	Rawlings			Stadium: The Dell; Attendance: 21,315

26 March 1927 Semi-Final	Arsenal	2–1	Southampton	London
	Hough (o.g.); Buchan		Rawlings	Stadium: Stamford Bridge; Attendance: 52,133

== Other matches ==
Outside of the league and the FA Cup, Southampton played six additional first-team matches during the 1926–27 season. The first was a friendly match against Southern League side Guildford United on 22 September 1926. Guildford won the match at home 3–2, with Billy Murphy and Bill Rawlings scoring for the visitors. A second friendly against Aldershot Command followed on 4 November, which the Saints won convincingly 4–0. On 25 April 1927, Southampton travelled to the nearby Dean Court to face Third Division South club Bournemouth & Boscombe Athletic. The Saints won 1–0, thanks to a sole goal from Rawlings. A final friendly against Exeter City, also of the Third Division South, on 4 May ended in a 1–1 draw, Rawlings again scoring to make it four goals in the season's four friendlies.

Five days after the Exeter City draw, Southampton hosted local rivals Portsmouth in the annual Hampshire Benevolent Cup. Despite having secured promotion to the First Division two days earlier, Pompey were outclassed in a 4–1 win for the Saints. Rowley opened the scoring after 13 minutes and scored a second 20 minutes later, before Rawlings made it three before the half-time break. In the second half, Willie Haines scored a penalty before Rawlings responded with his second and Southampton's fourth. In the Rowland Hospital Cup two days later, Pompey picked up a similarly dominant win when they beat the Saints 5–1 at Fratton Park. Goals for the home side came from Haines (two), Frederick Cook, Jerry Mackie and Goodwin, while recent signing Fred Lohse scored the consolation for the visitors.

22 September 1926 Friendly	Guildford United	3–2	Southampton	Guildford
			Murphy; Rawlings	Stadium: Joseph's Road

4 November 1926 Friendly	Aldershot Command	0–4	Southampton	Aldershot
			Rowley; Rawlings

25 April 1927 Friendly	Bournemouth & Boscombe Athletic	0–1	Southampton	Bournemouth
			Rawlings	Stadium: Dean Court

4 May 1927 Friendly	Exeter City	1–1	Southampton	Exeter
			Rawlings	Stadium: St James Park

9 May 1927 Hampshire BC	Southampton	4–1	Portsmouth	Southampton
	Rowley 13', 33'; Rawlings		Haines (pen.)	Stadium: The Dell; Attendance: 3,000; Referee: W. J. Parker

11 May 1927 Rowland Hospital Cup	Portsmouth	5–1	Southampton	Portsmouth
	Haines; Cook; Mackie; Goodwin		Lohse	Stadium: Fratton Park; Attendance: 7,000; Referee: R. J. Welch

== Player details ==
Southampton used 22 different players during the 1926–27 season, eleven of whom scored during the campaign. The team played in a 2–3–5 formation throughout the campaign, using two full-backs, three half-backs, two outside forwards, two inside forwards and a centre-forward. Michael Keeping, first choice at left-back since the departure of Fred Titmuss at the end of the previous campaign, played in every league and FA Cup game of the season, missing only the Hampshire Benevolent Cup. Similarly, right-back Ted Hough (first choice following the sale of Tom Parker) appeared in all but one league match during the campaign. Goalkeeper Tommy Allen also featured in all league and FA Cup matches, missing only the two season-end fixtures against Portsmouth. Centre-forward Bill Rawlings finished as the season's top scorer with 23 goals in the league, five in the FA Cup and two in the Hampshire Benevolent Cup. New signing Dick Rowley scored 13 times in the league, five times in the FA Cup and twice in the Hampshire Benevolent Cup. George Harkus and Keeping were the club's highest-scoring half-back and full-back, respectively, each with a goal each in the Second Division and the FA Cup.

=== Squad statistics ===
Name	Pos.	Nat.	League		FA Cup		Other (Note: "Other" includes the Rowland Hospital Cup and Hampshire Benevolent Cup matches.)		Total	
Name	Pos.	Nat.	Apps.	Gls.	Apps.	Gls.	Apps.	Gls.	Apps.	Gls.
Bill Adams	HB	(England)	0	0	0	0	1	0	1	0
Tommy Allen	GK	(England)	42	0	6	0	0	0	48	0
Arthur Bradford	HB	(England)	7	0	0	0	0	0	7	0
Jimmy Bullock	FW	(England)	4	1	0	0	0	0	4	1
Cuthbert Coundon	FW	(England)	3	0	1	0	0	0	4	0
Stan Cribb	FW	(England)	3	0	0	0	0	0	3	0
George Harkus	HB	(England)	40	1	6	1	2	0	48	2
Bill Henderson	FW	(England)	38	6	5	0	2	0	45	6
Ted Hough	FB	(England)	41	0	6	0	2	0	49	0
Michael Keeping	FB	(England)	42	1	6	1	1	0	49	2
Ernie King	HB	(England)	1	0	0	0	0	0	1	0
Fred Lohse	FW	(England)	0	0	0	0	2	1	2	1
Frank Matthews	FW	(England)	3	1	0	0	0	0	3	1
Billy Murphy	FW	(England)	39	4	6	0	2	0	47	4
Bill Rawlings	FW	(England)	38	23	6	5	2	2	46	30
Dick Rowley	FW	(Republic of Ireland)	35	13	6	5	2	2	43	20
Bert Shelley	HB	(England)	39	1	6	0	2	0	47	1
Jim Swinden	FW	(England)	1	0	0	0	0	0	1	0
Sam Taylor	FW	(England)	39	7	6	0	0	0	45	7
George Thompson	GK	(England)	0	0	0	0	2	0	2	0
Stan Woodhouse	HB	(England)	40	0	6	0	2	0	48	0
Players with appearances who left before the end of the season
Alf Bishop	FW	(England)	7	0	0	0	0	0	7	0

=== Most appearances ===
Rank	Name	Pos.	League		FA Cup		Other		Total	
Rank	Name	Pos.	Apps.	%	Apps.	%	Apps.	%	Apps.	%
1	Michael Keeping	FB	42	100.00	6	100.00	1	50.00	49	98.00
1	Ted Hough	FB	41	97.62	6	100.00	2	100.00	49	98.00
3	Tommy Allen	GK	42	100.00	6	100.00	0	0.00	48	96.00
3	George Harkus	HB	40	95.24	6	100.00	2	100.00	48	96.00
3	Stan Woodhouse	HB	40	95.24	6	100.00	2	100.00	48	96.00
6	Billy Murphy	FW	39	92.86	6	100.00	2	100.00	47	94.00
6	Bert Shelley	HB	39	92.86	6	100.00	2	100.00	47	94.00
8	Bill Rawlings	FW	38	90.48	6	100.00	2	100.00	46	92.00
9	Sam Taylor	FW	39	92.86	6	100.00	0	0.00	45	90.00
9	Bill Henderson	FW	38	90.48	5	83.33	2	100.00	45	90.00

=== Top goalscorers ===
Rank	Name	Pos.	League		FA Cup		Other		Total	
Rank	Name	Pos.	Gls.	GPG	Gls.	GPG	Gls.	GPG	Gls.	GPG
1	Bill Rawlings	FW	23	0.60	5	0.83	2	1.00	30	0.65
2	Dick Rowley	FW	13	0.37	5	0.83	2	1.00	20	0.46
3	Sam Taylor	FW	7	0.17	0	0.00	0	0.00	7	0.15
4	Bill Henderson	FW	6	0.15	0	0.00	0	0.00	6	0.13
5	Billy Murphy	FW	4	0.10	0	0.00	0	0.00	4	0.08
6	George Harkus	HB	1	0.02	1	0.16	0	0.00	2	0.04
6	Michael Keeping	FB	1	0.02	1	0.16	0	0.00	2	0.04
8	Fred Lohse	FW	0	0.00	0	0.00	1	0.50	1	0.50
8	Frank Matthews	FW	1	0.33	0	0.00	0	0.00	1	0.33
8	Jimmy Bullock	FW	1	0.25	0	0.00	0	0.00	1	0.25
8	Bert Shelley	HB	1	0.02	0	0.00	0	0.00	1	0.02

== Bibliography ==
- Chalk, Gary; Holley, Duncan (10 August 1987), A Complete Record of Southampton Football Club: 1885–1987, Derby, England: Breedon Books, ISBN 978-0907969228
- Chalk, Gary; Holley, Duncan; Bull, David (28 November 2013), All the Saints: A Complete Who's Who of Southampton FC, Bristol, England: Hagiology Publishing, ISBN 978-0992686406
- Juson, Dave; Aldworth, Clay; Bendel, Barry; Bull, David; Chalk, Gary (10 November 2004), Saints v Pompey: A History of Unrelenting Rivalry, Bristol, England: Hagiology Publishing, ISBN 978-0953447459
