= 1925–26 Southampton F.C. season =

English football club season

Southampton F.C.
1925–26 season
- Chairman: Wyndham Portal
- Manager: George Goss (until October 1925); Arthur Chadwick (from October 1925)
- Stadium: The Dell
- Second Division: 14th
- FA Cup: Third round
- Top goalscorer: League: Bill Rawlings (20); All: Bill Rawlings (20)
- Highest home attendance: League: 18,000 v Portsmouth (5 September 1925); Overall: 18,391 v Liverpool (9 January 1926)
- Lowest home attendance: 5,000 v Oldham Athletic (27 March 1926)
- Average home league attendance: 9,806
- Biggest win: 5–0 v Bradford City (6 February 1926)
- Biggest defeat: 0–4 v Hull City (7 September 1925)
Home colours

The 1925–26 season was the 31st season of competitive football by Southampton, and the club's fourth in the Second Division of the Football League. After finishing in the top half of the league table in their first three seasons in the division, Southampton had their worst year to date in the second flight when they finished in 14th place, ending just six points above the first relegation position. The club suffered a string of losses at the beginning of the campaign, leaving them with points to make up in later months. Former player Arthur Chadwick was brought in as Southampton's new manager in October, and the club subsequently secured their position in the Second Division with a run of wins over the Christmas period, despite continuing to lose points. The club finished in 14th place with 15 wins, eight draws and 19 losses.

In the 1925–26 FA Cup (the first in which all First and Second Division clubs entered at the third round), Southampton faced top-flight side Liverpool at The Dell for the third year running in the tournament. The game finished goalless, and the Saints were eliminated in the replay by a single goal. As usual, the club ended the season with two games against local rivals Portsmouth, for the Rowland Hospital Cup and the Hampshire Benevolent Cup, respectively. Pompey won both games, beating the Saints 4–2 at The Dell in the former and 5–1 at Fratton Park in the latter. The club also played five additional friendly games during the campaign, beating Portsmouth in September and Leicester City in March, drawing with Corinthian in January and Guildford United in April, and losing to Bournemouth & Boscombe Athletic in April.

Southampton used 29 different players during the 1925–26 season and had 14 different goalscorers. The club's top scorer was centre-forward Bill Rawlings, who scored 20 goals in the Second Division and one in the Hampshire Benevolent Cup. Six new players were signed by the club during the campaign, with eight released and sold to other clubs. The average attendance at The Dell during the 1925–26 season was 9,806. The highest attendance was 18,391 for the FA Cup third round tie against Liverpool on 9 January 1926; the lowest was around 5,000 against Oldham Athletic in the league on 27 March 1926. The season was the club's last to feature long-time forward Arthur Dominy, who left on a free transfer to join First Division side Everton in the summer of 1926, having made almost 400 appearances for the Saints.

== Background and transfers ==
At the end of the 1924–25 season, several players left Southampton. Amongst the departures were a number of players who had spent only a season with the club: outside-left Fred Price joined Wolverhampton Wanderers, Scottish centre-half John Callagher signed for Third Division North side Wigan Borough, right-half Dennis Jones left for Midland League champions Mansfield Town, and outside-right Tommy Broad was sold to Weymouth in the Southern League. Albert Barrett, a wing-half who had only joined from West Ham United in February, left in June to join Fulham. Scottish forward Willie McCall joined Queen of the South on a permanent basis in September, having spent the previous season on loan at the club. The club also added several players in the summer, signing outside-right Cuthbert Coundon from North Eastern League club Jarrow, inside-left Frank Matthews from Second Division rivals Barnsley, and Welsh forward Ernest Turner from Third Division South side Merthyr Town.

One of the later signings of the summer was goalkeeper Len Hill, who joined from Queens Park Rangers in June 1925. Regular keeper Tommy Allen had turned down a new contract at the club, leading to the signing of Hill as his replacement. Allen later agreed to new terms in October and returned to his place as first-choice Southampton goalkeeper, with Hill making sporadic appearances later in the season. Transfer activity continued throughout the season. In December 1925 the club signed inside-forward Jim Swinden from Salisbury City, following a trial in which he scored two goals on his debut for the reserve side against Folkestone. In March 1926, right-half Bill Adams joined from Southern League side Guildford United. Needing money to purchase the freehold of The Dell, Southampton sold mainstay full-backs Fred Titmuss and Tom Parker in early 1926 – the former in February to Plymouth Argyle for £1,750; the latter in March to Arsenal for £3,250 – which "caused uproar amongst supporters".

Players transferred in

| Name | Nationality | Pos. | Club | Date | Fee | Ref. |
|---|---|---|---|---|---|---|
| Cuthbert Coundon | England | FW | (England) Jarrow | April 1925 | Unknown | |
| Frank Matthews | England | FW | (England) Barnsley | May 1925 | Unknown | |
| Ernest Turner | Wales | FW | (Wales) Merthyr Town | May 1925 | Unknown | |
| Len Hill | England | GK | (England) Queens Park Rangers | June 1925 | Unknown | |
| Jim Swinden | England | FW | (England) Salisbury City | December 1925 | Unknown | |
| Bill Adams | England | HB | (England) Guildford United | March 1926 | Unknown | |

Players transferred out

| Name | Nationality | Pos. | Club | Date | Fee | Ref. |
|---|---|---|---|---|---|---|
| Fred Price | England | FW | (England) Wolverhampton Wanderers | May 1925 | Unknown | |
| Albert Barrett | England | HB | (England) Fulham | June 1925 | Unknown | |
| John Callagher | Scotland | HB | (England) Wigan Borough | June 1925 | £400 | |
| Dennis Jones | England | HB | (England) Mansfield Town | June 1925 | Unknown | |
| Tommy Broad | England | FW | (England) Weymouth | September 1925 | £100 | |
| Willie McCall | Scotland | FW | (Scotland) Queen of the South | September 1925 | £250 | |
| Fred Titmuss | England | FB | (England) Plymouth Argyle | February 1926 | £1,750 | |
| Tom Parker | England | FB | (England) Arsenal | March 1926 | £3,250 | |

== Second Division ==
The 1925–26 season started off poorly for Southampton, who lost their first four matches of the campaign and scored only two goals to find themselves at the bottom of the Second Division league table. The run included a 3–1 home defeat to local rivals Portsmouth described by club historians as a "particularly bitter blow", and a 4–0 loss at fellow mid-table side Hull City. After picking up their first points with a win over Nottingham Forest and a draw at Derby County, Southampton appointed former half-back Arthur Chadwick as the club's new manager, after secretary George Goss and the board of directors had been temporarily managing the club following Jimmy McIntyre's departure the previous December. The team's position in the league slowly began to improve as they picked up a few more points, including 4–1 wins over Darlington and Swansea Town, before another run of four losses leading up to Christmas left them 19th in the table, one point above the relegation zone with more games played than teams below.

After being eliminated from the FA Cup at the first hurdle, Southampton's fortunes in the league began to change. The club won four out of four games between 16 January and 10 February 1926, including a 2–1 win over Portsmouth at Fratton Park and a 5–0 thrashing of fellow strugglers Bradford City at Valley Parade – their biggest win in the Second Division. The Saints continued to pick up important wins throughout the final months of the season, allowing them to secure a mid-table finish with games remaining. Highlights included a 4–2 victory over promotion hopefuls Wolverhampton Wanderers and a 3–1 defeat of Oldham Athletic, who would finish seventh in the league. The side remained in 14th place for the last five games of the season, where they finished with 15 wins, eight draws and 19 losses. Club historians described Southampton's 1925–26 campaign as "a disappointing season", noting that it ended with "rumblings off the field" following the controversial transfers of Tom Parker and Fred Titmuss.

=== List of match results ===
| 29 August 1925 1 | Blackpool | 2–1 | Southampton | Blackpool |
| | | | Dominy | Stadium: Bloomfield Road; Attendance: 18,000 |

| 31 August 1925 2 | Southampton | 0–2 | Hull City | Southampton |
| | | | | Stadium: The Dell; Attendance: 9,433 |

| 5 September 1925 3 | Southampton | 1–3 | Portsmouth | Southampton |
| | Price | | Parker 27' (o.g.); Beedie 30'; Meerie | Stadium: The Dell; Attendance: 18,000; Referee: W. Musther |

| 7 September 1925 4 | Hull City | 4–0 | Southampton | Kingston upon Hull |
| | | | | Stadium: Anlaby Road; Attendance: 10,000 |

| 12 September 1925 5 | Southampton | 2–0 | Nottingham Forest | Southampton |
| | Price | | | Stadium: The Dell; Attendance: 9,304 |

| 19 September 1925 6 | Derby County | 2–2 | Southampton | Derby |
| | | | Rawlings | Stadium: Baseball Ground; Attendance: 4,000 |

| 26 September 1925 7 | Southampton | 1–2 | Bradford City | Southampton |
| | Price | | | Stadium: The Dell; Attendance: 9,000 |

| 30 September 1925 8 | Darlington | 3–1 | Southampton | Darlington |
| | | | Rawlings | Stadium: Feethams; Attendance: 4,838 |

| 3 October 1925 9 | Port Vale | 1–1 | Southampton | Hanley |
| | | | Rawlings | Stadium: Old Recreation Ground; Attendance: 10,000 |

| 5 October 1925 10 | Southampton | 4–1 | Darlington | Southampton |
| | Campbell; Turner; Rawlings; Price | | | Stadium: The Dell; Attendance: 8,205 |

| 10 October 1925 11 | Southampton | 0–0 | Barnsley | Southampton |
| | | | | Stadium: The Dell; Attendance: 12,000 |

| 17 October 1925 12 | Wolverhampton Wanderers | 4–1 | Southampton | Wolverhampton |
| | | | Own goal | Stadium: Molineux Stadium; Attendance: 20,000 |

| 24 October 1925 13 | Southampton | 4–1 | Swansea Town | Southampton |
| | Rawlings; Coundon; Price | | | Stadium: The Dell; Attendance: 13,000 |

| 31 October 1925 14 | Preston North End | 2–2 | Southampton | Preston |
| | | | Turner; Price | Stadium: Deepdale; Attendance: 12,000 |

| 7 November 1925 15 | Southampton | 3–1 | Middlesbrough | Southampton |
| | Coundon; Dominy; Carr | | | Stadium: The Dell; Attendance: 10,000 |

| 14 November 1925 16 | Oldham Athletic | 1–0 | Southampton | Oldham |
| | | | | Stadium: Boundary Park; Attendance: 12,000 |

| 21 November 1925 17 | Southampton | 3–0 | Stockport County | Southampton |
| | Coundon; Dominy; Rawlings | | | Stadium: The Dell; Attendance: 9,000 |

| 28 November 1925 18 | Fulham | 1–1 | Southampton | London |
| | | | Rawlings | Stadium: Craven Cottage; Attendance: 25,000 |

| 5 December 1925 19 | Southampton | 0–1 | South Shields | Southampton |
| | | | | Stadium: The Dell; Attendance: 9,000 |

| 12 December 1925 20 | The Wednesday | 2–1 | Southampton | Sheffield |
| | | | Rawlings | Stadium: Hillsborough Stadium; Attendance: 20,000 |

| 19 December 1925 21 | Southampton | 1–2 | Stoke City | Southampton |
| | Matthews | | | Stadium: The Dell; Attendance: 8,000 |

| 25 December 1925 22 | Clapton Orient | 2–1 | Southampton | London |
| | | | Turner | Stadium: Clapton Stadium; Attendance: 14,000 |

| 26 December 1925 23 | Southampton | 2–0 | Clapton Orient | Southampton |
| | Dominy; Rawlings | | | Stadium: The Dell; Attendance: 16,000 |

| 2 January 1926 24 | Southampton | 2–2 | Blackpool | Southampton |
| | Woodhouse; Rawlings | | | Stadium: The Dell; Attendance: 6,000 |

| 16 January 1926 25 | Portsmouth | 1–2 | Southampton | Portsmouth |
| | Haines 20' | | Matthews 5'; Rawlings 60' | Stadium: Fratton Park; Attendance: 12,000; Referee: W. Musther |

| 23 January 1926 26 | Nottingham Forest | 1–2 | Southampton | West Bridgford |
| | | | Dominy; Matthews | Stadium: City Ground; Attendance: 8,000 |

| 6 February 1926 27 | Bradford City | 0–5 | Southampton | Bradford |
| | | | Rawlings; Henderson; Bullock; Carr | Stadium: Valley Parade; Attendance: 14,000 |

| 10 February 1926 28 | Southampton | 2–1 | Derby County | Southampton |
| | Bullock | | | Stadium: The Dell; Attendance: 6,000 |

| 13 February 1926 29 | Southampton | 2–3 | Port Vale | Southampton |
| | Rawlings | | | Stadium: The Dell; Attendance: 11,000 |

| 20 February 1926 30 | Barnsley | 2–0 | Southampton | Barnsley |
| | | | | Stadium: Oakwell; Attendance: 8,000 |

| 27 February 1926 31 | Southampton | 4–2 | Wolverhampton Wanderers | Southampton |
| | Parker; Henderson; Rawlings; Matthews | | | Stadium: The Dell; Attendance: 8,000 |

| 6 March 1926 32 | South Shields | 2–0 | Southampton | South Shields |
| | | | | Stadium: Horsley Hill; Attendance: 4,000 |

| 13 March 1926 33 | Southampton | 2–0 | Preston North End | Southampton |
| | Rawlings; Matthews | | | Stadium: The Dell; Attendance: 6,000 |

| 20 March 1926 34 | Middlesbrough | 3–0 | Southampton | Middlesbrough |
| | | | | Stadium: Ayresome Park; Attendance: 10,000 |

| 27 March 1926 35 | Southampton | 3–1 | Oldham Athletic | Southampton |
| | Keeping; Dominy; Carr | | | Stadium: The Dell; Attendance: 5,000 |

| 29 March 1926 36 | Swansea Town | 3–1 | Southampton | Swansea |
| | | | Bullock | Stadium: Vetch Field; Attendance: 10,581 |

| 2 April 1926 37 | Chelsea | 0–0 | Southampton | London |
| | | | | Stadium: Stamford Bridge; Attendance: 40,000 |

| 3 April 1926 38 | Stockport County | 1–2 | Southampton | Stockport |
| | | | Woodhouse; Henderson | Stadium: Edgeley Park; Attendance: 7,000 |

| 5 April 1926 39 | Southampton | 0–1 | Chelsea | Southampton |
| | | | | Stadium: The Dell; Attendance: 17,000 |

| 10 April 1926 40 | Southampton | 2–0 | Fulham | Southampton |
| | Bradford; Rawlings | | | Stadium: The Dell; Attendance: 8,000 |

| 24 April 1926 41 | Southampton | 1–2 | The Wednesday | Southampton |
| | Keeping | | | Stadium: The Dell; Attendance: 8,000 |

| 1 May 1926 42 | Stoke City | 1–1 | Southampton | Stoke-on-Trent |
| | | | Carr | Stadium: Victoria Ground; Attendance: 8,000 |

=== Final league table ===
| Pos | Team | Pld | W | D | L | GF | GA | GAv | Pts |
|---|---|---|---|---|---|---|---|---|---|
| 12 | Preston North End | 42 | 18 | 7 | 17 | 71 | 84 | 0.845 | 43 |
| 13 | Hull City | 42 | 16 | 9 | 17 | 63 | 61 | 1.033 | 41 |
| 14 | Southampton | 42 | 15 | 8 | 19 | 63 | 63 | 1.000 | 38 |
| 15 | Darlington | 42 | 14 | 10 | 18 | 72 | 77 | 0.935 | 38 |
| 16 | Bradford City | 42 | 13 | 10 | 19 | 47 | 66 | 0.712 | 36 |

=== Results by matchday ===
| Round | 1 | 2 | 3 | 4 | 5 | 6 | 7 | 8 | 9 | 10 | 11 | 12 | 13 | 14 | 15 | 16 | 17 | 18 | 19 | 20 | 21 | 22 | 23 | 24 | 25 | 26 | 27 | 28 | 29 | 30 | 31 | 32 | 33 | 34 | 35 | 36 | 37 | 38 | 39 | 40 | 41 | 42 |
|---|---|---|---|---|---|---|---|---|---|---|---|---|---|---|---|---|---|---|---|---|---|---|---|---|---|---|---|---|---|---|---|---|---|---|---|---|---|---|---|---|---|---|
| Ground | A | H | H | A | H | A | H | A | A | H | H | A | H | A | H | A | H | A | H | A | H | A | H | H | A | A | A | H | H | A | H | A | H | A | H | A | A | A | H | H | H | A |
| Result | L | L | L | L | W | D | L | L | D | W | D | L | W | D | W | L | W | D | L | L | L | L | W | D | W | W | W | W | L | L | W | L | W | L | W | L | D | W | L | W | L | D |
| Position | 16 | 20 | 21 | 22 | 20 | 18 | 19 | 19 | 19 | 17 | 17 | 18 | 17 | 17 | 16 | 17 | 16 | 16 | 17 | 18 | 19 | 19 | 19 | 19 | 18 | 14 | 13 | 12 | 14 | 15 | 14 | 15 | 13 | 15 | 14 | 15 | 15 | 14 | 14 | 14 | 14 | 14 |

Source: 11v11.com
A = Away; H = Home; W = Win; D = Draw; L = Loss

== FA Cup ==
The 1925–26 FA Cup was the first edition of the competition in which all First Division and Second Division clubs entered at the third round. Southampton entered the tournament at home to Liverpool, who they were facing for the third consecutive year – they had lost in 1923–24, and had won in 1924–25. The hosts entered the game with regular starters Bert Shelley and Cliff Price unavailable due to injury, and during the match goalkeeper Tommy Allen suffered bruised ribs in a collision with defender Michael Keeping, forcing him to leave the field. Half-back Arthur Bradford took over in goal, and the Saints held on for a goalless draw. In the replay at Anfield four days later, Southampton succumbed to a 1–0 defeat by the top-flight side, with Dick Forshaw scoring the only goal of the game after 65 minutes.

| 9 January 1926 Round 3 | Southampton | 0–0 | Liverpool | Southampton |
| | | | | Stadium: The Dell; Attendance: 18,391 |

| 13 January 1926 Round 3 Replay | Liverpool | 1–0 | Southampton | Liverpool |
| | Forshaw 65' | | | Stadium: Anfield; Attendance: 41,902 |

== Other matches ==
Outside of the league and the FA Cup, Southampton played seven additional first-team matches during the 1925–26 season. The first was a friendly against local rivals Portsmouth at Fratton Park on 23 September 1925, a testimonial for former Pompey (and briefly Saints) full-back Jack Warner. The visitors won the game 3–0, with Jimmy Bullock at centre-forward scoring all three goals – the first a "glorious shot" in the 36th minute, and the other two in the Southampton-dominated second half. On 28 January 1926 the club faced amateur side Corinthian at The Dell, drawing 3–3 with goals from Bill Rawlings (two) and Bill Henderson. On 15 March they hosted Leicester City in a benefit match for Tommy Allen and Bert Shelley, beating the recently promoted First Division club 2–0 thanks to a brace from Frank Matthews. In April the club played two more friendly matches, drawing 1–1 with Guildford United at Joseph's Road and losing 1–0 to Bournemouth & Boscombe Athletic at Dean Court.

As in previous years, Southampton ended the 1925–26 season with two more matches against Portsmouth, competing for the Rowland Hospital Cup and the Hampshire Benevolent Cup. The first meeting, on 3 May 1926 for the former trophy, was a high-scoring affair ending in a 4–2 win for the visiting Pompey side. A George Harkus own goal opened the scoring, after he passed back to goalkeeper James Thitchener, who controlled the ball but was already over the goal line. Michael Keeping equalised with a penalty after a handball by John McColgan, but by half-time it was 3–1 against the Saints following another own goal and a McColgan penalty. In the second half, Jerry Mackie added a fourth for Pompey before Jimmy Bullock scored a second consolation goal for the hosts. Two days later, the sides met again at Fratton Park for the Hampshire Benevolent Cup. The hosts were victorious again, in a similarly high-scoring game, as they thrashed Southampton 5–1. The club were 3–0 up at half-time through goals from Goodwin and a Willie Haines brace, before Haines completed his hat-trick in the second half and Haywood scored a fifth. Bill Rawlings scored the consolation goal for the travelling Southampton side.

| 23 September 1925 Friendly | Portsmouth | 0–3 | Southampton | Portsmouth |
| | | | Bullock | Stadium: Fratton Park; Attendance: 6,000–7,000 |

| 28 January 1926 Friendly | Southampton | 3–3 | Corinthian | Southampton |
| | Rawlings; Henderson | | Toppin; Ashton; Hartley | Stadium: The Dell; Attendance: 3,000 |

| 15 March 1926 Friendly | Southampton | 2–0 | Leicester City | Southampton |
| | Frank Matthews | | | Stadium: The Dell |

| 14 April 1926 Friendly | Guildford United | 1–1 | Southampton | Guildford |
| | | | Dominy | Stadium: Joseph's Road |

| 28 April 1926 Friendly | Bournemouth & Boscombe Athletic | 1–0 | Southampton | Bournemouth |
| | | | | Stadium: Dean Court |

| 3 May 1926 Rowland Hospital Cup | Southampton | 2–4 | Portsmouth | Southampton |
| | Keeping (pen.); Bullock | | Harkus (o.g.); Thitchener (o.g.); McColgan (pen.); Mackie | Stadium: The Dell |

| 5 May 1926 Hampshire BC | Portsmouth | 5–1 | Southampton | Portsmouth |
| | Goodwin 5'; Haines; Haywood | | Rawlings | Stadium: Fratton Park; Attendance: 3,000 |

== Player details ==
Southampton used 29 different players during the 1925–26 season, 14 of whom scored during the campaign. The team played in a 2–3–5 formation throughout the campaign, using two full-backs, three half-backs, two outside forwards, two inside forwards and a centre-forward. Left-half Stan Woodhouse made the most appearances during the season, playing in 37 of 42 league matches, both FA Cup matches and the Rowland Hospital Cup. Centre-forward Bill Rawlings missed seven league games, while outside-right Bill Henderson appeared in all but eight league games and the Rowland Hospital Cup. Rawlings finished the season as the club's top scorer, with 20 goals in the league and one in the Hampshire Benevolent Cup. Inside-left Cliff Price scored seven goals in his 16 league appearances. Woodhouse was the top-scoring half-back of the season with two league goals, and Michael Keeping was the top-scoring full-back with two goals in the Second Division and one in the Rowland Hospital Cup.

=== Squad statistics ===
| Name | Pos. | Nat. | League | | FA Cup | | Other (Note: Includes the Rowland Hospital Cup and Hampshire Benevolent Cup matches.) | | Total | |
| Name | Pos. | Nat. | Apps. | Gls. | Apps. | Gls. | Apps. | Gls. | Apps. | Gls. |
|---|---|---|---|---|---|---|---|---|---|---|
| Bill Adams | HB | (England) | 0 | 0 | 0 | 0 | 1 | 0 | 1 | 0 |
| Tommy Allen | GK | (England) | 24 | 0 | 1 | 0 | 1 | 0 | 26 | 0 |
| Arthur Bradford | HB | (England) | 22 | 1 | 2 | 0 | 0 | 0 | 24 | 1 |
| Les Bruton | FW | (England) | 2 | 0 | 0 | 0 | 0 | 0 | 2 | 0 |
| Jimmy Bullock | FW | (England) | 10 | 4 | 0 | 0 | 2 | 1 | 12 | 5 |
| Alec Campbell | HB | (England) | 19 | 1 | 2 | 0 | 0 | 0 | 21 | 1 |
| Jimmy Carr | FW | (Scotland) | 34 | 4 | 2 | 0 | 0 | 0 | 36 | 4 |
| Cuthbert Coundon | FW | (England) | 8 | 3 | 0 | 0 | 0 | 0 | 8 | 3 |
| Stan Cribb | FW | (England) | 9 | 0 | 0 | 0 | 2 | 0 | 11 | 0 |
| Arthur Dominy | FW | (England) | 27 | 6 | 2 | 0 | 0 | 0 | 29 | 6 |
| George Harkus | HB | (England) | 28 | 0 | 2 | 0 | 2 | 0 | 32 | 0 |
| Harris (Note: Players named "Harris" and "Smith" are listed in the lineup for the Rowland Hospital Cup match, however no first names are given.) | FW | (England) | 0 | 0 | 0 | 0 | 2 | 0 | 2 | 0 |
| Bill Henderson | FW | (England) | 34 | 3 | 2 | 0 | 1 | 0 | 37 | 3 |
| Len Hill | GK | (England) | 10 | 0 | 1 | 0 | 0 | 0 | 11 | 0 |
| Ted Hough | FB | (England) | 13 | 0 | 0 | 0 | 2 | 0 | 15 | 0 |
| Michael Keeping | FB | (England) | 31 | 2 | 2 | 0 | 2 | 1 | 35 | 3 |
| Ernie King | HB | (England) | 1 | 0 | 0 | 0 | 0 | 0 | 1 | 0 |
| Frank Matthews | FW | (England) | 16 | 5 | 0 | 0 | 0 | 0 | 16 | 5 |
| Sammy Meston | FW | (England) | 1 | 0 | 0 | 0 | 0 | 0 | 1 | 0 |
| Cliff Price | FW | (England) | 16 | 7 | 0 | 0 | 0 | 0 | 16 | 7 |
| Bill Rawlings | FW | (England) | 35 | 20 | 2 | 0 | 2 | 1 | 39 | 21 |
| Bert Shelley | HB | (England) | 21 | 0 | 0 | 0 | 2 | 0 | 23 | 0 |
| Smith | FW | (England) | 0 | 0 | 0 | 0 | 1 | 0 | 1 | 0 |
| James Thitchener | GK | (England) | 0 | 0 | 0 | 0 | 1 | 0 | 1 | 0 |
| Ernest Turner | FW | (Wales) | 16 | 3 | 0 | 0 | 0 | 0 | 16 | 3 |
| Stan Woodhouse | HB | (England) | 37 | 2 | 2 | 0 | 1 | 0 | 40 | 2 |
| Harry Yeomans | GK | (England) | 8 | 0 | 0 | 0 | 0 | 0 | 8 | 0 |
Players with appearances who left before the end of the season
| Tom Parker | FB | (England) | 29 | 1 | 2 | 0 | 0 | 0 | 31 | 1 |
| Fred Titmuss | FB | (England) | 11 | 0 | 0 | 0 | 0 | 0 | 11 | 0 |

=== Most appearances ===
| Rank | Name | Pos. | League | | FA Cup | | Other | | Total | |
| Rank | Name | Pos. | Apps. | % | Apps. | % | Apps. | % | Apps. | % |
|---|---|---|---|---|---|---|---|---|---|---|
| 1 | Stan Woodhouse | HB | 37 | 88.10 | 2 | 100.00 | 1 | 50.00 | 40 | 86.96 |
| 2 | Bill Rawlings | FW | 35 | 83.33 | 2 | 100.00 | 2 | 100.00 | 39 | 84.78 |
| 3 | Bill Henderson | FW | 34 | 80.95 | 2 | 100.00 | 1 | 50.00 | 37 | 80.43 |
| 4 | Jimmy Carr | FW | 34 | 80.95 | 2 | 100.00 | 0 | 0 | 36 | 78.26 |
| 5 | Michael Keeping | FB | 31 | 73.81 | 2 | 100.00 | 2 | 100.00 | 35 | 76.09 |
| 6 | George Harkus | HB | 28 | 66.67 | 2 | 100.00 | 2 | 100.00 | 32 | 69.57 |
| 7 | Tom Parker | FB | 29 | 69.05 | 2 | 100.00 | 0 | 0.00 | 31 | 67.39 |
| 8 | Arthur Dominy | FW | 27 | 64.29 | 2 | 100.00 | 0 | 0.00 | 29 | 63.04 |
| 9 | Tommy Allen | GK | 24 | 57.14 | 1 | 50.00 | 1 | 50.00 | 26 | 56.52 |
| 10 | Arthur Bradford | HB | 22 | 52.38 | 2 | 100.00 | 0 | 0.00 | 24 | 52.17 |

=== Top goalscorers ===
| Rank | Name | Pos. | League | | FA Cup | | Other | | Total | |
| Rank | Name | Pos. | Gls. | GPG | Gls. | GPG | Gls. | GPG | Gls. | GPG |
|---|---|---|---|---|---|---|---|---|---|---|
| 1 | Bill Rawlings | FW | 20 | 0.57 | 0 | 0.00 | 1 | 0.50 | 21 | 0.53 |
| 2 | Cliff Price | FW | 7 | 0.43 | 0 | 0.00 | 0 | 0.00 | 7 | 0.43 |
| 3 | Arthur Dominy | FW | 6 | 0.22 | 0 | 0.00 | 0 | 0.00 | 6 | 0.20 |
| 4 | Jimmy Bullock | FW | 4 | 0.40 | 0 | 0.00 | 1 | 0.50 | 5 | 0.41 |
| 4 | Frank Matthews | FW | 5 | 0.31 | 0 | 0.00 | 0 | 0.00 | 5 | 0.31 |
| 6 | Jimmy Carr | FW | 4 | 0.11 | 0 | 0.00 | 0 | 0.00 | 4 | 0.11 |
| 7 | Cuthbert Coundon | FW | 3 | 0.37 | 0 | 0.00 | 0 | 0.00 | 3 | 0.37 |
| 7 | Ernest Turner | FW | 3 | 0.18 | 0 | 0.00 | 0 | 0.00 | 3 | 0.18 |
| 7 | Michael Keeping | FB | 2 | 0.06 | 0 | 0.00 | 1 | 0.50 | 3 | 0.08 |
| 7 | Bill Henderson | FW | 3 | 0.08 | 0 | 0.00 | 0 | 0.00 | 3 | 0.08 |

== Bibliography ==
- Cavallini, Rob (2007), Play Up Corinth: A History of the Corinthian Football Club, Stroud: Stadia, ISBN 978-0752444796
- Chalk, Gary; Holley, Duncan (10 August 1987), A Complete Record of Southampton Football Club: 1885–1987, Derby, England: Breedon Books, ISBN 978-0907969228
- Chalk, Gary; Holley, Duncan; Bull, David (28 November 2013), All the Saints: A Complete Who's Who of Southampton FC, Bristol, England: Hagiology Publishing, ISBN 978-0992686406
- Juson, Dave; Aldworth, Clay; Bendel, Barry; Bull, David; Chalk, Gary (10 November 2004), Saints v Pompey: A History of Unrelenting Rivalry, Bristol, England: Hagiology Publishing, ISBN 978-0953447459
