= Jimmy Bullock =

English footballer

Personal information
- Full name: James Bullock
- Date of birth: 25 March 1902
- Place of birth: Gorton, England
- Date of death: 9 March 1977 (aged 74)
- Place of death: Stockport, England
- Height: 5 ft 8 in (1.73 m)
- Positions: Inside left; centre-forward

Youth career
- Gorton

Senior career*
Years	Team	Apps	(Gls)
1922–1924	Manchester City	0	(0)
1924	Crewe Alexandra	4	(1)
1924–1929	Southampton	33	(13)
1929–1930	Chesterfield	45	(32)
1930–1931	Manchester United	10	(3)
1931–1932	Dundalk		
1932–1933	Llanelli		
1933–19??	Hyde United		
- * Club domestic league appearances and goals

James Bullock (25 March 1902 – 9 March 1977) was an English professional footballer, who played as a forward who played for various clubs in the 1920s and 1930s.

== Playing career ==
Bullock was born in Gorton and after spending his early days playing with Gorton he joined Manchester City in March 1922. He failed to break into City's first team and in February 1924 he moved to Crewe Alexandra in Division Three North. After half a season with Crewe he was signed by Division Two Southampton in August 1924.

He remained at Southampton for five years during which he was usually only called upon to play in the first team when either Bill Rawlings or Arthur Dominy were unavailable. In his first three seasons at The Dell he only made fifteen appearances including a spell of ten games in the latter half of the 1925–26 season when first Dominy and then Rawlings were unavailable in which Bullock scored four goals, including a brace against Derby County on 10 February 1926. In the following season, although Dominy had now moved on to Everton, Bullock was again unable to secure a regular place as Saints had signed Dick Rowley who became the first choice at inside left. Rowley was injured in early December 1927, and after briefly trying Charlie Petrie at inside left, manager Arthur Chadwick moved Rawlings across and played Bullock at centre-forward. Bullock retained the No. 9 shirt for the rest of the season, scoring eight times from seventeen appearances.

Despite this relative success he then sat out the whole of the following season in the reserves, with new signings Jerry Mackie and Willie Haines being preferred in the first team. In his five seasons with the Saints, Bullock made only 33 league appearances scoring 13 goals, although he notched up a "staggering" 166 goals in 208 games for the reserves.

In June 1929, he was recommended by former Southampton player Alec Campbell to his successor as manager at Chesterfield, Teddy Davison. Bullock soon became a fixture in the Chesterfield line-up making 39 appearances at centre-forward in his first season scoring 31 goals as his new club finished fourth in the table. During this season, he scored four hat-tricks, including twice against Darlington. This run of form attracted him to several First Division clubs and he was signed by Manchester United in September 1930 for a fee of £1,250.

He made ten first team appearances for United but was only able to find the net in one match, although this was a hat-trick on 8 November 1930 at Leicester City (United lost the match 4–5). United finished the 1930–31 season at the foot of the table and were relegated to the Second Division.

Bullock then moved to Republic of Ireland for a season with Dundalk on a free transfer, followed by a season in Wales with Llanelli. He then returned to Manchester to his final club, Hyde United.

He died in Stockport on 9 March 1977.
