= Jim Swinden =

English footballer (1905–1971)

Personal information
- Full name: James Frederick Swinden
- Date of birth: 30 January 1905
- Place of birth: Fulham, England
- Date of death: March 1971 (aged 66)
- Place of death: Eastleigh, England
- Height: 5 ft 5 in (1.65 m)
- Position: Inside forward

Youth career
- 1922–1923: Eastleigh Athletic
- 1923–1924: Winchester City

Senior career*
Years	Team	Apps	(Gls)
1924–1925	Salisbury City		
1925–1929	Southampton	3	(0)
1929–19??	Newport (IOW)		
- Pirelli General
- * Club domestic league appearances and goals

James Frederick Swinden (30 January 1905 – March 1971) was an English professional footballer who played as an inside forward for Southampton in the 1920s.

== Football career ==
Although born in Fulham, Swinden was employed as a fitter at the Eastleigh Locomotive Works of the Southern Railway. He had played football in the Hampshire League with Eastleigh Athletic, Winchester City and Salisbury City when he was invited to The Dell for a trial in a reserve match against Folkestone in November 1925. After scoring twice in the trial match, he was signed on a professional contract.

Described as "small for a forward" he had "tremendous speed and no little skill". His first-team debut came when he took the place of Dick Rowley at inside-right for the Football League Second Division match at Swindon Town on 23 April 1927, with Rowley moving to centre-forward in the absence of Bill Rawlings. The match was drawn 2–2 and Rawlings returned for the next match thus preventing Swinden from appearing again that season.

His next appearances came a year later when he replaced new signing Jerry Mackie for the last two matches of the 1927–28 season, a 6–1 defeat at champions Manchester City and a 2–1 victory over Nottingham Forest.

Although Swinden remained with the Saints for another season, he made no further first-team appearances and in the summer of 1929 he returned to his employment with Southern Railway. He also returned to Hampshire League football with Newport on the Isle of Wight before playing in the Southampton League with Pirelli General.

Swinden later turned to coaching and worked with the Hampshire county representative sides.
