= Tommy Taylor (footballer, born 1903) =

English footballer (1903–1978)

Personal information
- Full name: Thomas Taylor
- Date of birth: 9 April 1903
- Place of birth: Wavertree, England
- Date of death: 14 November 1978 (aged 75)
- Place of death: St Helens, Lancashire, England
- Height: 5 ft 7 in (1.70 m)
- Position: Inside forward

Senior career*
Years	Team	Apps	(Gls)
1925–1926	Rhos		
1926–1927	Manchester City	0	(0)
1927–1929	Southampton	8	(4)
- * Club domestic league appearances and goals

Thomas Taylor (9 April 1903 – 14 November 1978) was an English professional footballer who played as an inside-forward for Southampton in the 1920s.

== Football career ==
Taylor was born in Wavertree and played as an amateur for Rhos in the Welsh National League, where he made an appearance for the Welsh League against Cheshire at Chester. In 1926, he joined Manchester City but failed to break through into the first team.

In August 1927, he moved to the south coast to join Southampton of the Football League Second Division. He made his debut when he took the place of Dick Rowley at inside-right for the match at Grimsby Town on 24 September 1927. The match finished 2–2, with his namesake Sammy Taylor scoring both the Saints' goals. He retained his place for the next match, before Rowley's return and was not called back into the first team until the penultimate match of the season, this time at inside-left, when he scored the consolation goal in a 6–1 defeat at champions Manchester City. In the next match, Taylor scored again in a 2–1 victory over Nottingham Forest.

At the start of the next season, Taylor played twice at inside-left in place of Charlie Petrie and scored in both matches, away to Port Vale and at home to Tottenham Hotspur. Despite this, he only made two further first-team appearances, both without scoring, and in November 1929 his contract was terminated.
