= Alf Bishop (footballer, born 1902) =

English footballer

Personal information
- Full name: Alfred Bishop
- Date of birth: 17 July 1902
- Place of birth: Aston, England
- Date of death: 5 March 1944 (aged 41)
- Place of death: Birmingham, England
- Height: 5 ft 10 in (1.78 m)
- Position: Inside forward

Youth career
- Royal Air Force

Senior career*
Years	Team	Apps	(Gls)
1925–1926	St Albans City	21	(10)
1926–1927	Southampton	7	(0)
1927	Wellington Town		
1927–1928	Cradley Heath St Luke's		
1928	Barrow	11	(2)
1928–1929	Cradley Heath		
1929–1930	Wellington Town		
1930–1931	Leamington Town		
1931	Stafford Rangers		
1931–1932	Bromsgrove Rovers		
- * Club domestic league appearances and goals

Alfred Bishop (17 July 1902 – 5 March 1944) was an English footballer who played as an inside-forward in the 1920s and 1930s.

== Football career ==
Bishop joined the Royal Air Force as a 16-year-old cadet in 1919. He was originally spotted by scouts from Southampton in 1923 while playing representative football for the RAF and was given a trial, although he was not then offered a contract because of his RAF service commitments. After spending a year with St Albans City of the Isthmian League, he left the RAF and signed for Southampton in August 1926.

In the summer of 1926, the "Saints" manager Arthur Chadwick had signed several new players, including Dick Rowley and Sammy Taylor, both of whom could play in either of the inside-forward positions. After trying first Rowley and then Bishop at inside-left (for four games), Chadwick recalled Frank Matthews for three games in September, moving Bishop over to the right for a further three games, before Rowley returned at inside-right. The form of Rowley and Taylor prevented Bishop regaining his place in the first-team, and he spent the remainder of his Saints' career in the reserves, where he made 23 appearances before his contract was cancelled in January 1927.

After a period in non-league football, he briefly resurrected his League career with a season in the Third Division North with Barrow. He then returned to the lower leagues with Cradley Heath of the semi-professional Birmingham & District League, before spells with Wellington Town, where he scored 36 goals in the 1929–30 season, Leamington Town, Stafford Rangers and Bromsgrove Rovers in 1931. He ended his playing career as an amateur for BSA (Birmingham) in 1932 and Billesley Estates in 1936.

== Later career ==
Bishop later worked at the Birmingham Small Arms (BSA) factories in Birmingham and Stoke-on-Trent. He rejoined the RAF at the outbreak of World War II, serving as an aircraft gunner in France before the Dunkirk evacuations. He was compassionately discharged from the service in May 1940 because of the terminal illness of his wife. He survived her until he died of tuberculosis in 1944, aged 41.
