= James Ellison (footballer, born 1901) =

English footballer (1901–1958)

Personal information
- Date of birth: 17 March 1901
- Place of birth: St Helens, Lancashire, England
- Date of death: 5 January 1958 (aged 56)
- Place of death: St Helens, Lancashire, England
- Height: 5 ft 11 in (1.80 m)
- Position: Full-back

Youth career
- St Helens YMCA

Senior career*
Years	Team	Apps	(Gls)
1921–1923	Tranmere Rovers	0	(0)
1923–1924	Rotherham County	0	(0)
1924–1927	Rhyl United		
1927–1928	Southampton	1	(0)
1928–1929	Rochdale	16	(0)
1929–1930	Connah's Quay & Shotton		
- * Club domestic league appearances and goals

James Ellison (17 March 1901 – 5 January 1958) was an English professional footballer who played as a full-back for various clubs, including Southampton and Rochdale, in the 1920s.

== Football career ==
Ellison was born in St Helens, Lancashire and played his early football as an amateur with St Helens YMCA, Tranmere Rovers, Rotherham County and Rhyl United before he moved to the south coast to join Southampton in May 1927.

After a satisfactory trial period, Ellison signed a professional contract in October 1927. He spent most of his time with the Saints in the reserves, making 59 appearances in his year at The Dell. His only first-team appearance came on 10 March 1928, when he took the place of Arthur Bradford at right-back for the game against Port Vale; the match was lost 2–1.

In the summer of 1928, Ellison returned to Lancashire to join Rochdale for whom he made 16 appearances in the Football League Third Division North, before winding up his career back in Wales with Connah's Quay.

== Later career ==
After retiring from football, he returned to St Helens, where he worked for Forster's Glass Company, playing occasionally for the works team.
