= Arthur Bradford (footballer) =

English footballer

Personal information
- Full name: James Arthur Bradford
- Date of birth: 3 July 1902
- Place of birth: Walsall, England
- Date of death: 13 April 1944 (aged 41)
- Place of death: Southampton, England
- Height: 5 ft 11 in (1.80 m)
- Position: Half back

Youth career
- Bloxwich All Saints
- Talbot Stead Tubeworks

Senior career*
Years	Team	Apps	(Gls)
1922–1936	Southampton	306	(6)
1936–1937	Cowes Sports		
- * Club domestic league appearances and goals

James Arthur Bradford (3 July 1902 – 13 April 1944) was an English footballer who played his entire professional career (from 1922 to 1936) as a half back with Southampton. He was one of the "Saints"' most loyal players ever.

== Playing career ==
Bradford was born in Walsall and played his youth football with Bloxwich All Saints, before joining the Talbot Stead Tube works team (from which Ted Hough was signed in October 1921) where he was spotted by scouts from Southampton and offered a trial. After a successful trial he signed a professional contract in September 1922 but didn't make his first team debut until 18 April 1924 in a Second Division match at Crystal Palace, replacing Bill Turner at centre half.

He spent the first half of the following season in the reserves until mid-February when he was called into the team at left half (with George Harkus moving forward), and retained his place for the rest of the season. For the 1925–26 season he played approximately half of the league games and scored his first goal for the club in a 2–0 victory over Fulham on 10 April 1925. He missed most of the following season, unable to break into the established half-back line of Bert Shelley, George Harkus and Stan Woodhouse.

From 1927–28 onwards he was more regularly selected by manager Arthur Chadwick, often filling in at full back in place of Michael Keeping or Ted Hough. According to Holley & Chalk, he was "ideally built for a centre-back role (his) versatility was put to good use and in emergencies he would even play in goal". Midway through the 1929–30 season he was moved to right-back taking over from Hough for the rest of the season, retaining his place at right back for the following season, in which he missed only three matches.

Following the departure of manager Chadwick in April 1931, his replacement George Kay signed Frank Campbell from Scotland who was generally preferred to Bradford, who played in only about half the matches in 1931–32. By the following season, with Johnny McIlwaine taking a year out to play in the Welsh League, Bradford was team captain, missing only four matches as Saints again finished in Second Division mid-table obscurity. He continued to appear regularly over the next few seasons, and could be selected for any of the two full back and three centre back positions.

After 14 seasons at The Dell, Bradford eventually retired at the end of the 1935–36 season. During this period he played under four managers and made a total of 319 appearances (with 7 goals); all his league matches were in the Second Division in a period during which the Saints struggled financially and were generally forced to sell their better players to survive. Bradford's loyalty and longevity earned him two benefit matches.

After leaving the Saints, he became the licensee at the Plume of Feathers public house in St Mary's Street. He also played one season with Cowes Sports helping them to win the Hampshire Senior Cup.

He died in Southampton on 13 April 1944 aged only 41 years.
