= Ted Robinson (footballer) =

English footballer

Personal information
- Full name: Edward Robinson
- Date of birth: 27 September 1903
- Place of birth: Hindley, England
- Date of death: 28 July 1972 (aged 68)
- Place of death: Hindley, England
- Height: 5 ft 8 in (1.73 m)
- Position: Full-back

Youth career
- 1916–1919: Hindley St. Benedict's
- 1919–1922: Castle Hill
- 1922–1923: Hindley Rovers
- 1923–1924: Hindley St. Benedict's
- 1924–1925: Hindley Green Athletic

Senior career*
Years	Team	Apps	(Gls)
1925–1927	Chorley		
1927–1928	Southampton	1	(0)
1928–1933	Southport	108	(6)
1933–1947	Wigan Athletic	237	(3)
- * Club domestic league appearances and goals

Edward Robinson (27 September 1903 – 28 July 1972) was an English professional footballer who played as a full-back for Southampton, Southport and Wigan Athletic.

== Football career ==
Robinson was born in Hindley, near Wigan and in his youth played football for several clubs in the area before joining Chorley of the Lancashire Combination in 1925.

In August 1927, he moved to the south coast to join Southampton of the Football League Second Division. He spent most of his time with the Saints in the reserves, making 67 appearances in his year at The Dell. His only first-team appearance came on 31 December 1927, when he took the place of Ted Hough at right-back for the game at Stoke City; the match was lost 2–1.

In the summer of 1928, Robinson was released and returned to Lancashire to join Southport of the Football League Third Division North, where he remained for five years, making 108 league appearances, scoring six goals. At Southport, he was the regular penalty taker.

In June 1933, Robinson moved to Wigan Athletic, then in the Cheshire County League where he remained for 14 years. During his time at Springfield Park, Wigan were Cheshire County League champions for three consecutive seasons, 1933–34, 1934–35 and 1935–36. In 1946, Robinson took up a role as trainer before retiring in the summer of 1947.

== Later career ==
On retiring from football, Robinson joined the local fire brigade and settled in Hindley where he died in 1972, aged 68.

== Honours ==
Wigan Athletic

- Cheshire County League champions: 1933–34, 1934–35, 1935–36
