= Sam Taylor (English footballer) =

English footballer

Personal information
- Full name: Samuel James T. Taylor
- Date of birth: 17 September 1893
- Place of birth: Sheffield, England
- Date of death: 1973 (Aged 80)
- Place of death: Sheffield, England
- Height: 5 ft 8 in (1.73 m)
- Position: Inside forward

Youth career
- Atlas & Norfolk Works
- Silverwood Colliery

Senior career*
Years	Team	Apps	(Gls)
1919–1921	Huddersfield Town	61	(39)
1921–1925	Sheffield Wednesday	120	(36)
1925–1926	Mansfield Town		
1926–1928	Southampton	69	(17)
1928–1929	Halifax Town	13	(3)
1929	Grantham		
1929–1930	Chesterfield	24	(8)
1930–????	Llanelli		
- * Club domestic league appearances and goals

Samuel James T. Taylor (17 September 1893 – 1973) was an English professional footballer, who played at inside forward for various clubs in the 1920s, including Huddersfield Town, Sheffield Wednesday and Southampton.

== Football career ==
Taylor was born in Sheffield and, as a youth, played for various works teams in the area, including Atlas & Norfolk Works and Silverwood Colliery. During the First World War, he played as a guest for Rotherham County and Bradford Park Avenue.

In May 1919, he signed for Huddersfield Town of the Football League Second Division. In his first season, he was ever-present, scoring 35 goals from 42 league appearances as Huddersfield finished as runners-up and was promoted to the First Division for the first time. This made Taylor the top scorer in the Second Division for 1919–20. Taylor also held the record for the highest number of goals scored in one season by a Huddersfield player (later equalled by George Brown) until this was beaten by Jordan Rhodes in April 2012.

Taylor also scored six goals in Huddersfield's run to the 1921 FA Cup final, during which they defeated First Division sides Newcastle United and Liverpool. In the final, they met another First Division side, Aston Villa; Villa's "form and pedigree" were too much for Huddersfield, who despite dogged defending, was beaten in extra time by a header from Billy Kirton.

Taylor was unable to reproduce his form in the First Division, managing only four goals in 1920–21, and he returned to the Second Division when he was transferred to Sheffield Wednesday in January 1921. He made his debut for Wednesday on 15 January 1921 away to Port Vale and remained in Sheffield for four full seasons until May 1925, making a total of 128 appearances, scoring 39 goals.

Taylor spent the 1925–26 season in the Midland League with Mansfield Town before returning to the Second Division with Southampton in June 1926. The Saints paid a fee of £300, which was paid to Sheffield Wednesday, who still retained his registration. He made his debut at inside-right in the opening game of the season, a local derby at Portsmouth, when he scored in a 3–1 defeat. He retained his place for a further five games without scoring and was replaced by Alf Bishop before being recalled, this time at inside-left on 9 October. Taylor then scored in three consecutive matches and retained his place for the rest of the season. Described as "a thoughtful and intelligent inside-forward", Taylor developed a good relationship on the left-wing with Billy "Spud" Murphy and Stan Woodhouse, with "simple, planned moves" allowing Taylor a free run at goal. Alternatively, his "decoy" moves would allow Murphy the room to run down the flank.

In 1927–28, Taylor rarely missed a match, occasionally alongside his namesake Tommy Taylor, until mid-March when he lost his place to his former Sheffield Wednesday colleague, Charlie Petrie. At the end of the season, he was released and moved back to the north of England to join Halifax Town.

He then wound down his career with spells at Grantham, Chesterfield and Llanelli.

== Honours ==
Huddersfield Town

- Football League Second Division runner-up: 1919–20
- FA Cup runner-up: 1919–20
