= William Beedie =

Scottish footballer (1894–1951)

Personal information
- Full name: William Alexander Clark Beedie
- Date of birth: 22 April 1894
- Place of birth: Montrose, Scotland
- Date of death: 1951 (aged 54–55)
- Position: Winger

Senior career*
Years	Team	Apps	(Gls)
1915–1919	Clyde		
1919–1920	Blantyre Celtic		
1920–1926	Portsmouth	202	(30)
1926–1927	Oldham Athletic	0	(0)
Total		202	(30)
- * Club domestic league appearances and goals

William Alexander Clark Beedie (22 April 1894 – 1951) was a Scottish footballer who played in the Football League for Portsmouth.
