= Ted Hough =

English footballer

Personal information
- Full name: Edward Hough
- Date of birth: 4 December 1899
- Place of birth: Walsall, England
- Date of death: 3 September 1978 (aged 78)
- Place of death: Birmingham, England
- Height: 5 ft 10 in (1.78 m)
- Position: Full-back

Youth career
- Talbot Stead Tubeworks

Senior career*
Years	Team	Apps	(Gls)
1921–1931	Southampton	175	(0)
1931–1932	Portsmouth	1	(0)
1932–1933	Bristol Rovers	1	(0)
- * Club domestic league appearances and goals

Edward Hough (4 December 1899 – 3 September 1978) was an English footballer who spent most of his career with Southampton playing as a centre-half and later as a full-back.

== Playing career ==
=== Southampton ===
Hough was born in Walsall and was playing for Talbot Stead Tubeworks when he was spotted by scouts from Southampton. In October 1921, one of the Southampton directors was despatched to the Midlands to secure his services and after a meeting with the Tubeworks board, they agreed to release him if the director stood a round of drinks – eventually, after buying a total of 52 pints of beer, the contract was signed and Hough was released to join "the Saints".

He made his first-team debut on 17 April 1922 playing at centre-half in a 1–0 victory over Aberdare Athletic. Over the next two seasons, Hough made only the occasional appearance, generally standing in for Alec Campbell at centre-half or Fred Titmuss at left-back. At the start of the 1924–25 season, Hough was preferred by manager Jimmy McIntyre to Titmuss for the first seven matches. From late-September onwards, he and Titmuss vied for the No. 3 shirt, until March when Hough took over at right-back from Tom Parker for the rest of the season.

In September 1925, Parker was restored to the side and Hough spent the first six months of the season in the reserves until February 1926, when Parker was sold to Arsenal, with Titmuss also leaving to join Plymouth Argyle. Having made only 40 league appearances in 4 1/2 years, Hough finally became a fixture in the side.

In 1926–27 he missed only one match as manager Arthur Chadwick settled on his favoured line-up with eleven players featuring in at least 35 of the 42 league games; this included a half back line-up of Bert Shelley, George Harkus and Stan Woodhouse, in front of full-backs Michael Keeping and Hough. In the FA Cup, Southampton had an excellent run reaching the semi-final against Arsenal. The semi-final was played at Stamford Bridge on 26 March 1927; after the Saints had an early penalty appeal turned down by the referee, Arsenal mounted a prolonged pressure on the Southampton goal, resulting in the opening score, when a cross-shot from Joe Hulme was deflected by Hough past Tommy Allen into the Saints' goal. Arsenal went on to win the match 2–1 to reach the final, where they lost 1–0 to Cardiff City.

Hough had several periods out with injury during the 1927–28 season, and only managed a total of 25 league appearances. He again started the 1928–29 season as Keeping's regular partner at the back, until injury forced him out at the end of October, to be replaced by Arthur Bradford for nine matches. The following season followed a similar pattern, with Hough missing half the season from December to April. With injuries now taking their toll, and Bradford establishing himself as his replacement, Hough only made three appearances and at the end of the season he was released. In his ten years at The Dell, Hough made 184 appearances in all competitions, never scoring.

=== Later career ===
In May 1931, Hough was sold to Portsmouth for a fee of £200, but only made one appearance at left-back, before moving on to Bristol Rovers in December 1932, where he also made just one appearance before retiring.

After retiring, he returned to the Portsmouth area, where he worked as a fitter's mate in the local power station.
