= Bert Shelley =

English footballer

Personal information
- Full name: Frederick Albert Shelley
- Date of birth: 11 August 1899
- Place of birth: Romsey, England
- Date of death: 29 December 1971 (aged 72)
- Place of death: Anfield, Liverpool, England
- Height: 5 ft 9 in (1.75 m)
- Position: Half back

Youth career
- Romsey Comrades
- 1915–1919: Military football

Senior career*
Years	Team	Apps	(Gls)
1919	Eastleigh Athletic		
1919–1932	Southampton	410	(9)
- * Club domestic league appearances and goals

Frederick Albert "Bert" Shelley (11 August 1899 – 29 December 1971) was an English footballer, who played as a half back for Southampton, for whom he made nearly 450 appearances, before becoming a coach at Southampton. His total of 448 appearances remained a club record until passed by Tommy Traynor in the mid-1960s.

== Military career ==
Shelley was born in Romsey, Hampshire and after starting in local football, had a distinguished career in military football whilst serving in India and Egypt during the First World War. In India, he served with the 2nd/5th Hampshire Territorials and was a member of the Battalion side which reached the semi-finals of the Calcutta Cup tournament in 1915. By 1918, he was in Egypt with the 1st/4th Wiltshires with whom he won the Divisional Cup.

== Football career ==
Following his demobilisation, he signed for Eastleigh Athletic in November 1919, but within weeks had signed for Southampton who were trying to rebuild their side in readiness for their entry into the newly formed Football League Third Division South at the end of the season. After spending a few months in the reserves, Shelley was given his big chance in the first team when Arthur Andrews broke his leg in an FA Cup tie at West Ham in January 1920. In the absence of a recognised right-half, the directors were pondering buying a replacement but they were persuaded by the club trainer, former England right-half Bert Lee, to "give the young Shelley a chance".

Shelley made his debut in the Southern League in a 2–2 home draw with Cardiff City on 17 January 1920. He made the most of his opportunity and kept his place for the last 18 games of the season, playing on the losing side only five times as the team consolidated itself and went on to finish in eighth position in their last season in the Southern League. He rapidly gained considerable repute as a consistent, reliable half-back in the "stopper mould", having the knack of smothering opposing forwards by his ability to anticipate and intercept through-balls.

In 1920, the Saints were elected to the Football League Third Division for its inaugural season, in which Shelley missed only three matches, forming a good relationship with Bill Turner at left-half, with Alec Campbell or George Moorhead at centre-half. Although they finished second in the league, Southampton missed out on the only promotion spot to Crystal Palace. Under manager Jimmy McIntyre, Saints went one better in 1921–22, finishing equal on points with Plymouth Argyle but with a superior goal average, with Shelly and Turner both ever-present.

The half back line of Shelley, Campbell and Turner cemented Saints place in the Second Division over the next few years, until Campbell lost his place to George Harkus in March 1924. By the start of the 1924–25 season, Turner had left the club, and Campbell had regained his place in the centre with Harkus moving to the left. In November 1924, Shelley missed a match for the first time since the end of the 1920–21 season, thus ending a run of 141 consecutive appearances, covering three whole seasons.

In December 1924, Saints' poor league form led to the resignation of manager Jimmy McIntyre. Caretaker manager George Goss led them on a run in the FA Cup, defeating Liverpool in round 4, to reach the semi-final at Stamford Bridge, where they were defeated 2–0 by Sheffield United on 28 March 1925, with Shelley playing in all five cup matches. For the 1925–26 season, Saints appointed Arthur Chadwick as manager, but his arrival made only a moderate impact on the team's fortunes, finishing 14th in the table. Having hardly missed a game since his debut in January 1920, Shelley lost his place in December 1925, with Harkus taking over at right-half alongside Arthur Bradford and Stan Woodhouse, before Shelley was recalled for the last two matches of the season.

In the 1926–27 season, Chadwick settled on his favoured line-up with eleven players featuring in at least 35 of the 42 league games; this included a half back line-up of Shelley, Harkus (in the centre) and Woodhouse on the left, in front of full-backs Michael Keeping and Ted Hough. Despite the settled look of the side, the Saints struggled in the league, but had a great run to the semi-final of the 1927 FA Cup, defeating Newcastle United on the way. In the semi-final, played at Stamford Bridge on 26 March 1927, Saints were eliminated 2–1 by Arsenal with Saints' goal coming from Bill Rawlings. In this match, Saints came up against their former star full-back Tom Parker who had had a nightmare in Saints' previous semi-final appearance two years earlier. This time Parker was on the winning side as Arsenal moved on to Wembley, losing to Cardiff City in the final.

With occasional spells on the sidelines, Shelley retained his place at right-half for the next two seasons, but for 1929–30 his appearances were more irregular with, first, Bradford and then Arthur Wilson taking over. In the following season, Shelley had a long run at centre-half, with Harkus having left the club, before handing over to Johnny McIlwaine. Shelley's final season was 1931–32 when he was used as cover for McIlwaine in the centre or Frank Campbell on the right, with his final appearance being away to Plymouth Argyle on 16 April 1932.

Shelley was not selected for full international honours, but was a member of an F.A. XI which toured South Africa in 1929.

In his long playing career for Southampton, he made 410 league and 38 FA Cup appearances, scoring nine goals.

== Coaching career ==
Following his retirement from playing, he remained at The Dell as coach to the club's first "nursery" team which competed in the Hampshire League. His success with the youngsters led to him being asked by manager George Kay to take over as first-team trainer following the retirement of his mentor, Bert Lee in 1935.

Saints started the 1935–36 season (their fiftieth season since the club's foundation in 1885) with four wins and two draws from their first six matches, but were unable to sustain this form and in the period to the New Year they won only three more matches. After another poor season, in which the Saints finished in seventeenth place, nine members of the board resigned and George Kay left to take over at Liverpool, taking Shelley with him.

At Anfield, Shelley was a part of George Kay's coaching staff, helping the Reds take the English Football League championship in 1946–47. After Kay's retirement in 1951, Shelley remained a member of the coaching staff under Don Welsh until 1956.

Shelley remained in Liverpool for the rest of his life, dying there in December 1971, aged 72.

== Honours ==
Southampton

- Football League Third Division South champions: 1921–22
