= Cuthbert Coundon =

English footballer

Personal information
- Date of birth: 4 April 1905
- Place of birth: Sunderland, England
- Date of death: 18 December 1978 (aged 73)
- Place of death: Sutton, London, England
- Height: 5 ft 7 in (1.70 m)
- Position: Outside right

Youth career
- Mercantile Dock XI
- 1923–1925: Jarrow

Senior career*
Years	Team	Apps	(Gls)
1925–1928	Southampton	26	(3)
1928–1929	Wolverhampton Wanderers	13	(1)
1929–1930	Southend United	0	(0)
1930–1935	Guildford City		
- * Club domestic league appearances and goals

Cuthbert Coundon (4 April 1905 – 18 December 1978) was an English footballer who played at outside-right in the 1920s, for Southampton and Wolverhampton Wanderers.

== Football career ==
Coundon was born in Sunderland and represented Sunderland Schools. On leaving school, he took up an apprenticeship as a joiner, playing part-time for Jarrow in the North Eastern League, where he was spotted by scouts from Southampton of the Football League Second Division.

He moved to the south coast in April 1925 for a fee of £300. At The Dell, Coundon was dubbed "The Kid" by Saints' supporters because of his youthful appearance. His appearance was misleading, however, as he was sturdily built and brimful with enthusiasm. He made his debut for Southampton on 24 October 1925, when he scored in a 4–0 victory over Swansea Town. He went on to score twice more in the next four games and was forming an understanding with Arthur Dominy on his inside, but his run in the side came to an end on the return of Bill Henderson in December.

Over the next season, Coundon only made a handful of appearances, before a run of 14 games in the 1927–28 season after Henderson had broken his arm. The return of Henderson in December brought Coundon's career at Southampton to a close and in June 1928 he was transferred to Wolverhampton Wanderers for a fee of £150.

Coundon spent one season with Wolves, before joining Southend United in May 1929. He then dropped down to non-league football in 1930, spending several years with Guildford City before becoming a coach with Sutton United in September 1935.
