= George Harkus =

English footballer (1898–1950)

Personal information
- Full name: George Cecil Harkus
- Date of birth: 25 September 1898
- Place of birth: Newcastle upon Tyne, England
- Date of death: 28 September 1950 (aged 52)
- Place of death: Southampton, England
- Height: 5 ft 9 in (1.75 m)
- Position: Half back

Youth career
- Nuns Moor
- Edinburgh Emmett
- Scotswood

Senior career*
Years	Team	Apps	(Gls)
1921–1923	Aston Villa	4	(0)
1923–1930	Southampton	218	(3)
1930	Lyon OU		
1931–1932	New Milton Town		
1932	Southampton	2	(0)
1932–1933	Southport	0	(0)
1933–1934	Boston United	16	(2)
- * Club domestic league appearances and goals

George Cecil Harkus (25 September 1898 – 28 September 1950) was an English professional footballer who played as a half back for Southampton in the 1920s before serving with distinction in the Royal Air Force during the Second World War.

Harkus was awarded the M.B.E. in the 1949 birthday honours list.

== Playing career ==
=== Early days ===
Harkus was born in Newcastle upon Tyne and played his youth football with Nuns Moor in Newcastle, before moving to Edinburgh where he played for Edinburgh Emmett. He then returned to Tyneside to join Scotswood. In May 1921 he joined Aston Villa as an amateur, signing as a professional in February 1922. He made four First Division appearances for Villa before being sold to Southampton for £250 in May 1923.

=== Southampton ===
He made his first team debut for the "Saints" at The Dell on 19 January 1924 replacing Alec Campbell at left-half in a 6–0 victory over Barnsley. By the end of his first season on the south coast he had played 14 games and had appeared on either side of the half-backs line. In the following season he only missed two league matches as Saints' poor league form led to the resignation of manager Jimmy McIntyre. Caretaker manager George Goss led them on a run in the FA Cup, defeating Liverpool in round 4, to reach the semi-final at Stamford Bridge, where they were defeated 2–0 by Sheffield United on 28 March 1925.

After a run of four defeats at the start of the 1925–26 season, Harkus was dropped in favour of Stan Woodhouse. In October, Saints appointed Arthur Chadwick as manager, who re-instated Harkus in the team at the expense of Campbell in November; he retained the left-back place for the rest of the season. In the 1926–27 season, Chadwick settled on his favoured line-up with eleven players featuring in at least 35 of the 42 league games; this included a half back line-up of Bert Shelley, Harkus (in the centre) and Woodhouse on the left, in front of full-backs Michael Keeping and Ted Hough. Described by Holley & Chalk as "a man of dynamic personality" and "tremendously energetic and enthusiastic, he was a natural captain who put so much into a game that, when the 90 minutes were up, he was often all in." Harkus featured strongly in Saints' run to their second FA Cup semi-final in two years, this time losing 2–1 to Arsenal at Stamford Bridge on 26 March 1927.

Although Harkus never received full international honours he came close, joining an F.A. tour of Canada in 1926, along with teammates Michael Keeping and Bill Rawlings.

In the 1927–28 season, Harkus continued as team captain and missed only one match as Saints again finished in the lower half of the table. For the next two seasons his appearances were more irregular as age and injuries caught up with him. In the summer of 1930 he decided to quit; Southampton were reluctant to release him from his registration and placed a transfer fee of £750 on his head. In his initial seven-year period with Southampton he made 233 appearances (with five goals); all his league matches were in the Second Division in a period during which the Saints struggled financially and were generally forced to sell their better players to survive.

=== Sojourn abroad ===
Harkus spent the rest of 1930 in France with Lyon OU, before returning to England. After an unsuccessful trial with Oldham Athletic, he settled in New Milton where he ran the Wheatsheaf Public House, and turned out for the Hampshire League team New Milton Town.

=== Return to Southampton ===
In February 1932, Southampton were facing an injury crisis with Alec Campbell, Johnny McIlwaine and Bert Jepson amongst the injured. Manager George Kay called on Harkus's services for two matches, against Wolverhampton Wanderers and Bradford both of which resulted in defeats.

=== Later career ===
He then moved to Lancashire to join Southport as a player-coach, but was seriously injured in a reserve team match against Barrow, preventing him making any first-team appearances. He did, however, join Boston United for the 1933–34 season making 16 appearances in the Midland League.

== Military career ==
After retiring from football, Harkus took up employment with the Ministry of Labour in London. On the outbreak of the Second World War, he joined the Royal Air Force and, serving in the Middle East, he attained the rank of flight lieutenant. In the birthday honours list for 1949, Harkus was awarded the M.B.E. for "keeping up the morale in the forces whilst stationed in the Middle East".

He remained in the R.A.F. after the war and continued his links with football. He had recently been appointed to their selection committee before his death at Southampton on 28 September 1950, shortly after his 52nd birthday, following an illness.
