= Michael Keeping =

English footballer and manager (1902–1984)

Personal information
- Full name: Alexander Edwin Michael Keeping
- Date of birth: 22 August 1902
- Place of birth: Milford on Sea, England
- Date of death: 28 March 1984 (aged 81)
- Place of death: Milford on Sea, England
- Height: 6 ft 0 in (1.83 m)
- Position: Full-back

Youth career
- Milford on Sea
- 1919–1920: Southampton

Senior career*
Years	Team	Apps	(Gls)
1920–1933	Southampton	265	(10)
1933–1939	Fulham	205	(7)
Total		470	(17)

Managerial career
- 1948–1950: Real Madrid
- H.B.S. (Netherlands)
- Ermelo (Netherlands)
- 1959–19??: Poole Town
- 1960–1961: Heracles Almelo
- * Club domestic league appearances and goals

Alexander Edwin Michael Keeping (22 August 1902 – 28 March 1984) was an English footballer and manager. He coached Real Madrid CF from January 1948 to October 1950.

== Family ==
His father was the Olympic medal winning cyclist Frederick Keeping.

== Playing career ==
=== Southampton ===
Keeping was born in Milford on Sea where he was spotted playing for his home-town club, Milford on Sea F.C., and was signed by Southampton, then still in the Southern League, in the summer of 1919 for a bargain fee of £25. Still only 16, Keeping was registered as an amateur but paid 10 shillings (50p) a week for travelling expenses.

He signed as a professional in December 1920 but only made his first-team debut on 25 October 1924, in a Football League Division 2 match at Hull City as a replacement for the long-serving Fred Titmuss who was injured. In his first season he made only seven league appearances. In the following season, he again started as an understudy to Titmuss but in October he took over at left-back and retained his position, with Titmuss leaving the club in February 1926. He soon blossomed into an outstanding left-back who "oozed class and being fleet of foot could turn on the run to sweep the ball straight up the touchline to the waiting winger".

He was selected for an international trial in February 1926 and joined an F.A. party on a tour of Canada in the summer.

He continued to display his skills in the Second Division and was an ever-present for the Saints in 1926–27 both in the league and in their run to the F.A. Cup semifinal at Stamford Bridge on 26 March 1927, which Southampton lost 1–2 to Arsenal. During this season manager Arthur Chadwick soon settled on his favoured line-up with eleven players featuring in at least 35 of the 42 league games; Keeping lined up in defence with Ted Hough behind the three centre-backs – Bert Shelley, George Harkus and Stan Woodhouse.

He missed the start of the 1927–28 season due to illness, but was otherwise a regular starter throughout the next four seasons as Saints regularly finished in mid-table. He played for the "Professionals" in the 1929 FA Charity Shield. He made a good start to the 1931–32 season and won his only representative honours when he played for the Football League against the Irish League in September 1931. He was then struck down with appendicitis in January and was out for the rest of the season.

In February 1933 Southampton needed to raise cash and they sold Keeping and Johnny Arnold to Fulham for a combined fee of £5,000, with Arthur Tilford temporarily joining the Saints. Jimmy McIntyre, the former Saints manager now in charge at Fulham boasted that this was "the best deal I ever brought off". In his playing career at The Dell, Keeping made a total of 281 appearances for the Saints, scoring twelve goals.

In Holley and Chalk's "Alphabet of the Saints", Keeping is described as "a debonair man, contemporaries recall him as being equally stylish off the pitch and, much to the amusement of his team-mates, he would take hours over his appearance".

In 1938 it was noted that he was the game's only air pilot and flew his own aeroplane. He also owned a couple of garages.

=== Fulham ===
Keeping joined Fulham in February 1933 and served them well until the outbreak of World War II in 1939. He continued to turn out occasionally for Fulham until 1941 when he returned to Milford to join the family motor business.

== Management career ==
From February 1948 to October 1950 he was coach at Real Madrid CF with which he won the Copa Eva Duarte, precursor of the Spanish Supercup, winning the final as cup winner of 1947 against the champions of 1947 Valencia CF in June 1948. In his first match his team allowed four goals in a 1–4 defeat to Celta de Vigo, a feat only repeated in August 2018 when Julen Lopetegui lost his first match 2–4 to Atlético de Madrid in the UEFA Super Cup final. Best league placings were the third and fourth ranks in 1949 and 1950. He was sacked in October 1950, after the eighth matchday for unsuitable remarks. Preceding there were also some hefty defeats in the league against Real Sociedad, FC Barcelona and Deportivo la Coruña with results of 2–6, 2–7 and 0–5.

After having had an administrative position with a Dutch side, in January 1959 he became successor of Stan Rickaby at Southern League club Poole Town.

Between September 1960 and January 1961, when he unexpectedly resigned for family reasons, he returned to England to get married, he was manager of the Dutch second division side Heracles Almelo.

He is also reported to have held positions in Denmark, France and North Africa.
