= Jerry Mackie (footballer) =

Scottish footballer

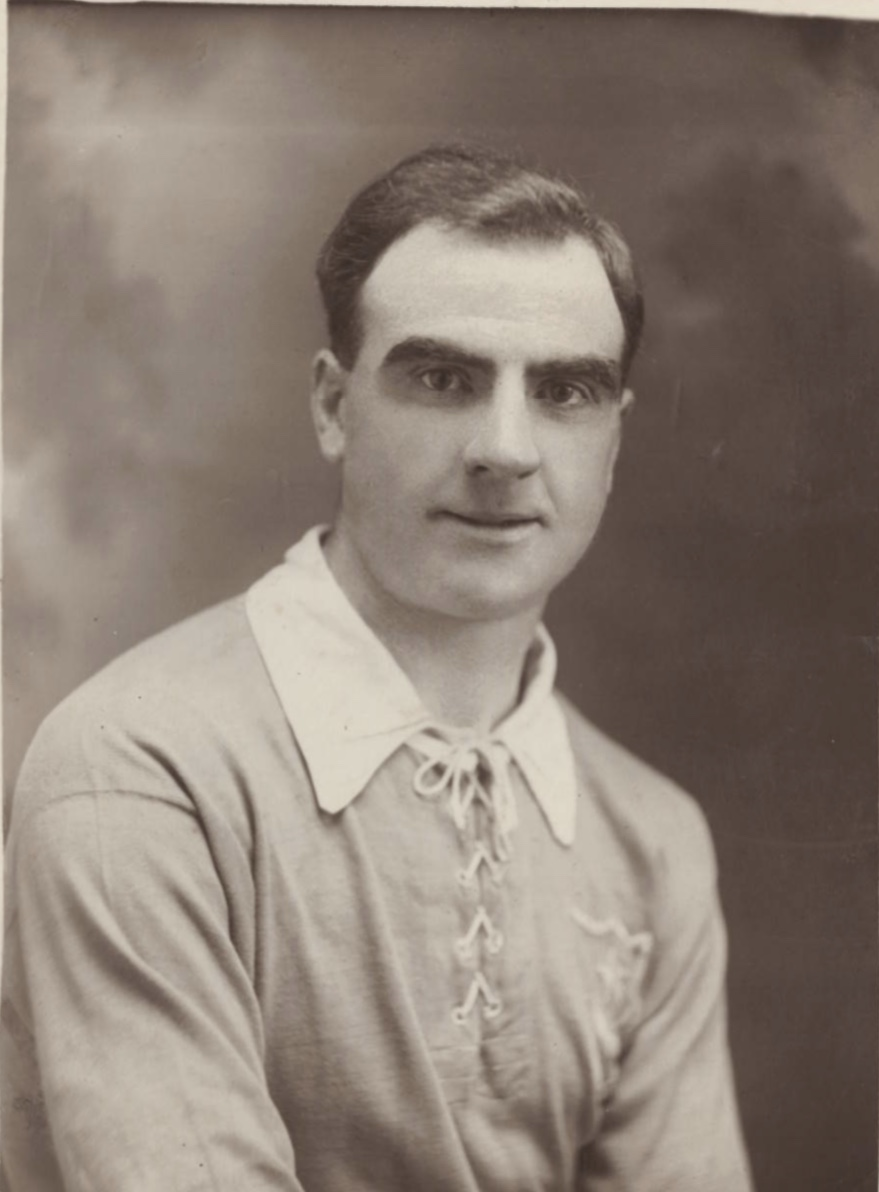

Personal information
- Full name: James Mackie
- Date of birth: 1 January 1894
- Place of birth: Motherwell, Scotland
- Date of death: 5 January 1959 (aged 65)
- Place of death: Bognor Regis, England
- Position: Inside right

Youth career
- Bo'ness

Senior career*
Years	Team	Apps	(Gls)
1913–1915	Motherwell	0	(0)
- Blantyre Celtic
1920–1928	Portsmouth	247	(78)
1928–1931	Southampton	81	(24)
- * Club domestic league appearances and goals

James"Jerry'" Mackie (1 January 1894 – 5 January 1959) was a Scottish footballer who played at inside forward for English south coast rivals, Portsmouth and then Southampton in the 1920s and 1930s.

== Football career ==
Mackie was born in Motherwell and, after playing in Scotland with Motherwell F.C. and junior club Blantyre Celtic, moved to the south coast of England to join Portsmouth in May 1920.

=== Portsmouth ===
Portsmouth became one of the founder members of the Football League Third Division for the 1920–21 season and Mackie was one of new manager, John McCartney's first signings. McCartney had boldly predicted that promotion to the Second Division would be secured in three years. Mackie soon became a regular in Portsmouth's team, taking over the inside-right position from Frank Stringfellow.

In the 1922–23 season, Mackie was a virtual ever-present missing only three games and his ten league goals made him Portsmouth's top-scorer for the season, as the club finished seventh in the table. For the next season, Mackie was part of a settled forward line containing Willie Haines up front with Mackie and Angus Meikle on the right and David Watson and William Beedie on the left. Portsmouth finished the season as champions of the Football League Third Division South with a four-point advantage over Plymouth Argyle.

In Portsmouth's first season in the Second Division, Haines shared the goal-scoring with Willie Haines with both players scoring 17 goals as Pompey finished in a creditable fourth place in the table. Mackie continued to score regularly in the next two seasons with 19 goals in 1925–26 when Portsmouth finished in mid-table, and 12 in 1926–27 as Pompey gained promotion to the First Division as runners-up, squeezing out Manchester City on goal average, by a margin of just 0.006. Mackie's goal tally included a pair scored in a 9–1 victory over Notts County on 9 April 1927 – this remains Portsmouth's record margin of victory.

For Portsmouth's first season in the top flight, Haines was out of favour with new manager Jack Tinn who was building a team for the future, with Welsh international Fred Cook taking over the position of inside-right. In March 1928, Mackie moved up the Solent to join local rivals Southampton for a fee of £1000. In his eight seasons at Fratton Park, Mackie scored 82 goals from 263 appearances in all competitions.

=== Southampton ===
At Southampton, Mackie was seen as the replacement for Bill Rawlings who had just moved to join Manchester United. Mackie made his debut for the "Saints" in a 2–1 defeat at South Shields on 17 March 1928, with his home debut coming a week later, when he scored a hat-trick in a 6–1 victory over Barnsley. By the end of the season, he had scored six goals from seven appearances, before he was injured bringing his season to a premature end.

For the 1928–29 season, Mackie was re-united with his former strike partner, Willie Haines and the pair scored 26 goals between as the Saints finished fourth in the Second Division table. Mackie continued to create chances for Haines and his fellow forward, Dick Rowley, but injury kept him out of the team for long periods in the first half of next season and it was not until March 1930 that he had a sustained run of games. Mackie had been sent off in the opening match of the season, a 3–1 defeat away to Barnsley and he was the first Saints player to be dismissed since Jimmy Moore in December 1920.

A similar pattern followed in 1930–31, only appearing in the opening game (a 5–0 defeat at Preston), until, after several players had been tried at inside-right, including Laurie Cumming and Bill Fraser, he was recalled to the side in January 1931. On 14 March 1931, he scored his 100th league goal against Bristol City at The Dell.

At the end of the season he retired after making 84 appearances for the Saints, scoring 24 goals.

== Later life ==
After his retirement from football, he became the licensee of the Regents Park Hotel in Shirley, remaining a publican for 24 years. He later settled in Bognor Regis, where he died in 1959, a few days after his 65th birthday.

== Honours ==
Portsmouth

- Football League Third Division South championship: 1923–24
- Football League Second Division runners-up: 1926–27
