= Stan Woodhouse =

English footballer

Personal information
- Full name: Stanley Woodhouse
- Date of birth: 10 February 1899
- Place of birth: Warrington, England
- Date of death: 18 March 1977 (aged 78)
- Place of death: Southampton, England
- Height: 5 ft 9 in (1.75 m)
- Positions: Inside forward; half back

Youth career
- Monk's Hall

Senior career*
Years	Team	Apps	(Gls)
1921–1924	Bury	23	(5)
1924–1936	Southampton	351	(5)
1936–1937	Basingstoke Town		
- * Club domestic league appearances and goals

Stanley Woodhouse (10 February 1899 – 18 March 1977) was an English footballer who played initially as an inside forward and later as a half back with Bury and Southampton in the 1920s and 1930s.

== Playing career ==
Woodhouse was born in Warrington and played as a teenager for Monk's Hall in the Cheshire County League, before joining Bury in May 1921. At Bury he played at inside right making six appearances in each of the 1921–22 and 1922–23 seasons. In 1923–24 he made eleven appearances, contributing three goals as Bury gained second place in the Second Division table thus gaining promotion to the top flight.

In a bid to strengthen the team for their return to the First Division, Bury signed Southampton's experienced left half Bill Turner with Woodhouse and John Callagher moving to the south coast as part of the deal. Woodhouse made his debut for Southampton on 30 August 1924 in the opening match of the season playing at inside left, before losing his place to Cliff Price after six games. He made a few spasmodic appearances at inside left, before switching to left half for a few matches near the end of the season.

The following season he began to make the left half spot his own, lining up with either George Harkus or Bert Shelley on the right and Alec Campbell or Arthur Bradford in the centre. He soon established himself as "a half-back of some standing" and rarely missed a match over the next five seasons. In 1926–27 he only missed two league matches and appeared in all six FA Cup matches in Saints' run to the FA Cup Semi-final at Stamford Bridge on 26 March 1927, which Southampton lost 1–2 to Arsenal. During this season manager Arthur Chadwick settled on his favoured line-up with eleven players featuring in at least 35 of the 42 league games; Woodhouse lined up in midfield alongside Bert Shelley and George Harkus in front of full-backs Michael Keeping and Ted Hough.

Woodhouse was "an unsung player (who) was nevertheless a vital cog in the team – his probing passes were a special feature of his game". He continued to appear regularly although injury restricted his appearances in 1930–31 and 1931–32. For the start of the 1932–33 season he switched across to the right, with Bill Luckett on the left (and Arthur Bradford in the centre) until February when Luckett was pushed forward and Alec Campbell came in on the right of the half-backs, with Woodhouse reverting to the left.

He continued to feature regularly on either flank for the next few seasons until age and injury caught up with him and, like his long-serving partner Arthur Bradford, he retired at the end of the 1935–36 season. Woodhouse spent twelve seasons at The Dell, during which he made a total of 366 appearances (with 5 goals); all his league matches were in the Second Division in a period during which the Saints struggled financially and were generally forced to sell their better players to survive. At the time of his retirement, his total of 351 league appearances was only exceeded by Bert Shelley.

== Later career ==
After retiring from professional football, Woodhouse had a brief spell with Basingstoke Town before returning to Southampton where he became the licensee of the Bricklayers Arms in Warren Avenue, Shirley.

In 1951 he spent a few months as trainer to Southampton's youth teams. He died in Southampton on 18 March 1977, aged 78.

== Honours ==
Bury

- Football League Second Division: Runners-up 1923–24
