= Charlie Petrie =

English footballer (1898-1972)

Personal information
- Date of birth: 8 August 1898
- Place of birth: West Gorton, Manchester, England
- Date of death: 8 March 1972 (aged 73)
- Place of death: West Gorton, Manchester, England
- Height: 5 ft 8 in (1.73 m)
- Position: Inside left

Youth career
- Openshaw

Senior career*
| Years | Team | Apps | (Gls) |
| 1918–1919 | Manchester City | 0 | (0) |
| 1919–1922 | Stalybridge Celtic | 22 | (14) |
| 1922–1925 | Sheffield Wednesday | 57 | (22) |
| 1925–1927 | Swindon Town | 32 | (11) |
| 1927–1929 | Southampton | 24 | (7) |
| 1929–1930 | York City | 0 | (0) |
| Total | | 135 | (54) |
- * Club domestic league appearances and goals

Charles Petrie (8 August 1895 – 8 March 1972) was an English professional footballer who played at inside-left for various clubs in the 1920s.

== Football career ==
Petrie was born in West Gorton, Manchester and played as a youth for the nearby Openshaw F.C. At the end of the First World War he joined Manchester City as an apprentice, before moving in the summer of 1919 to Stalybridge Celtic, then playing in the Central League. In 1921, Celtic became one of the founder members of the Football League's Third Division (North). In February 1922, Petrie left Celtic and moved to Sheffield Wednesday of the Second Division.

At Wednesday, he made his debut in a 2–0 defeat at Nottingham Forest on 11 February 1922, replacing Johnny McIntyre who had left for Blackburn Rovers. Petrie retained his place for the remainder of the season, but in October 1922 was in turn replaced by the newly signed Andy Smailes. After Smailes moved on to Bristol City early in the 1923–24 season, Petrie was recalled to the first team. Petrie linked up well with Sid Binks at centre-forward and Sammy Taylor at inside-right, scoring 44 goals between them, of which Petrie contributed 16. Although Petrie started the next season, he soon lost out to Arthur Prince, making only three appearances.

In the summer of 1925, Petrie dropped down to the Third Division South with Swindon Town where he was used as cover for the well-established Jack Johnson. After two seasons at the County Ground in which he made 32 appearances, scoring 11 goals, Petrie was placed on the transfer list in the summer of 1927.

Although now 32 and past his prime, he was signed by Southampton of the Second Division for a fee of £150. At The Dell, Petrie provided extra competition for first team places and made his debut, replacing his former Sheffield Wednesday colleague Sam Taylor, away to Leeds United on 3 September 1927. For the duration of his time with the Saints, Petrie was in and out of the side, with his longest run of games being eight matches in September/October 1928, before Herbert Coates was signed in October. In two seasons, Petrie made 24 appearances, scoring some vital goals, before being released on a free transfer.

In July 1929, Petrie joined York City but failed to make any appearances for the first team before retiring the following summer.
