= Fred Titmuss =

English footballer

Personal information
- Full name: Frederick Titmuss
- Date of birth: 15 February 1898
- Place of birth: Pirton, Hertfordshire, England
- Date of death: 2 October 1966 (aged 68)
- Place of death: Plymouth, England
- Position: Full-back

Youth career
- Pirton United
- Hitchin Town

Senior career*
Years	Team	Apps	(Gls)
1919–1926	Southampton	210	(0)
1926–1932	Plymouth Argyle	166	(0)
????	St Austell		

International career
1922–1923	England	2	(0)
- * Club domestic league appearances and goals

Frederick Titmuss (15 February 1898 – 2 October 1966) was an English footballer who played as a full-back for Southampton, Plymouth Argyle and St Austell, and also made two appearances for England.

== Career ==
He joined Southampton as soon as hostilities were over and made a handful of appearances in friendly matches before the resumption of league football. Although Titmuss considered himself to be a left-winger, he was soon converted into an outstanding left-back. He played his first competitive match on the opening day of the 1919–20 Southern League season and quickly formed a partnership with Tom Parker, who were described as "the best pair of backs in the South".

Southampton were champions of Division Three (South) in 1922 conceding only 21 goals, with Titmuss an ever-present. According to Holley & Chalk's "Alphabet of the Saints", "his speciality was the slide tackle although his perfect positional play often meant that such 'last ditch' defending was hardly ever needed."

== Honours ==
Southampton

- Football League Third Division South champions: 1921–22
