= 1927–28 in English football =

Football in England
- Season: 1927–28

Men's football
- Football League: Everton
- Football League Second Division: Manchester City
- FA Cup: Blackburn Rovers

The 1927–28 season was the 53rd season of competitive football in England.

== Events ==
This was the season in which Dixie Dean scored 60 goals in 39 league appearances for Everton – more than half of their total for the season (102).

== Honours ==
Competition	Winner	Runner-up
First Division	Everton (3)	Huddersfield Town
Second Division	Manchester City	Leeds United
Third Division North	Bradford Park Avenue	Lincoln City
Third Division South	Millwall	Northampton Town
FA Cup	Blackburn Rovers (6*)	Huddersfield Town
Charity Shield	Cardiff City	Corinthian
Home Championship	Wales	Ireland

Notes = Number in parentheses is the times that club has won that honour. * indicates new record for competition

== Football League ==
=== First Division ===
Pos	Team	Pld	W	D	L	GF	GA	GAv	Pts	Relegation
1	Everton (C)	42	20	13	9	102	66	1.545	53	
2	Huddersfield Town	42	22	7	13	91	68	1.338	51	
3	Leicester City	42	18	12	12	96	72	1.333	48	
4	Derby County	42	17	10	15	96	83	1.157	44	
5	Bury	42	20	4	18	80	80	1.000	44	
6	Cardiff City	42	17	10	15	70	80	0.875	44	
7	Bolton Wanderers	42	16	11	15	81	66	1.227	43	
8	Aston Villa	42	17	9	16	78	73	1.068	43	
9	Newcastle United	42	15	13	14	79	81	0.975	43	
10	Arsenal	42	13	15	14	82	86	0.953	41	
11	Birmingham	42	13	15	14	70	75	0.933	41	
12	Blackburn Rovers	42	16	9	17	66	78	0.846	41	
13	Sheffield United	42	15	10	17	79	86	0.919	40	
14	The Wednesday	42	13	13	16	81	78	1.038	39	
15	Sunderland	42	15	9	18	74	76	0.974	39	
16	Liverpool	42	13	13	16	84	87	0.966	39	
17	West Ham United	42	14	11	17	81	88	0.920	39	
18	Manchester United	42	16	7	19	72	80	0.900	39	
19	Burnley	42	16	7	19	82	98	0.837	39	
20	Portsmouth	42	16	7	19	66	90	0.733	39	
21	Tottenham Hotspur (R)	42	15	8	19	74	86	0.860	38	Relegation to the Second Division
22	Middlesbrough (R)	42	11	15	16	81	88	0.920	37	Relegation to the Second Division

Source: World Football
Rules for classification: 1) Points; 2) Goal average; 3) Goals scored
(C) Champions; (R) Relegated

=== Second Division ===
Pos	Team	Pld	W	D	L	GF	GA	GAv	Pts	Promotion or relegation
1	Manchester City (C, P)	42	25	9	8	100	59	1.695	59	Promotion to the First Division
2	Leeds United (P)	42	25	7	10	98	49	2.000	57	Promotion to the First Division
3	Chelsea	42	23	8	11	75	45	1.667	54	
4	Preston North End	42	22	9	11	100	66	1.515	53	
5	Stoke City	42	22	8	12	78	59	1.322	52	
6	Swansea Town	42	18	12	12	75	63	1.190	48	
7	Oldham Athletic	42	19	8	15	75	51	1.471	46	
8	West Bromwich Albion	42	17	12	13	90	70	1.286	46	
9	Port Vale	42	18	8	16	68	57	1.193	44	
10	Nottingham Forest	42	15	10	17	83	84	0.988	40	
11	Grimsby Town	42	14	12	16	69	83	0.831	40	
12	Bristol City	42	15	9	18	76	79	0.962	39	
13	Barnsley	42	14	11	17	65	85	0.765	39	
14	Hull City	42	12	15	15	41	54	0.759	39	
15	Notts County	42	13	12	17	68	74	0.919	38	
16	Wolverhampton Wanderers	42	13	10	19	63	91	0.692	36	
17	Southampton	42	14	7	21	68	77	0.883	35	
18	Reading	42	11	13	18	53	75	0.707	35	
19	Blackpool	42	13	8	21	83	101	0.822	34	
20	Clapton Orient	42	11	12	19	55	85	0.647	34	
21	Fulham (R)	42	13	7	22	68	89	0.764	33	Relegation to the Third Division South
22	South Shields (R)	42	7	9	26	56	111	0.505	23	Relegation to the Third Division North

(C) Champions; (P) Promoted; (R) Relegated

=== Third Division North ===
Pos	Team	Pld	W	D	L	GF	GA	GAv	Pts	Promotion or relegation
1	Bradford (Park Avenue) (C, P)	42	27	9	6	101	45	2.244	63	Promotion to the Second Division
2	Lincoln City	42	24	7	11	91	64	1.422	55	
3	Stockport County	42	23	8	11	89	51	1.745	54	
4	Doncaster Rovers	42	23	7	12	80	44	1.818	53	
5	Tranmere Rovers	42	22	9	11	105	72	1.458	53	
6	Bradford City	42	18	12	12	85	60	1.417	48	
7	Darlington	42	21	5	16	89	74	1.203	47	
8	Southport	42	20	5	17	79	70	1.129	45	
9	Accrington Stanley	42	18	8	16	76	67	1.134	44	
10	New Brighton	42	14	14	14	72	62	1.161	42	
11	Wrexham	42	18	6	18	64	67	0.955	42	
12	Halifax Town	42	13	15	14	73	71	1.028	41	
13	Rochdale	42	17	7	18	74	77	0.961	41	
14	Rotherham United	42	14	11	17	65	69	0.942	39	
15	Hartlepools United	42	16	6	20	69	81	0.852	38	
16	Chesterfield	42	13	10	19	71	78	0.910	36	
17	Crewe Alexandra	42	12	10	20	77	86	0.895	34	
18	Ashington	42	11	11	20	77	103	0.748	33	
19	Barrow	42	10	11	21	54	102	0.529	31	
20	Wigan Borough	42	10	10	22	56	97	0.577	30	
21	Durham City (R)	42	11	7	24	53	100	0.530	29	Failed re-election and demoted
22	Nelson	42	10	6	26	76	136	0.559	26	Re-elected

Source: rsssf.com
(C) Champions; (P) Promoted; (R) Relegated

=== Third Division South ===
Pos	Team	Pld	W	D	L	GF	GA	GAv	Pts	Promotion
1	Millwall (C, P)	42	30	5	7	127	50	2.540	65	Promotion to the Second Division
2	Northampton Town	42	23	9	10	102	64	1.594	55	
3	Plymouth Argyle	42	23	7	12	85	54	1.574	53	
4	Brighton & Hove Albion	42	19	10	13	81	69	1.174	48	
5	Crystal Palace	42	18	12	12	79	72	1.097	48	
6	Swindon Town	42	19	9	14	90	69	1.304	47	
7	Southend United	42	20	6	16	80	64	1.250	46	
8	Exeter City	42	17	12	13	70	60	1.167	46	
9	Newport County	42	18	9	15	81	84	0.964	45	
10	Queens Park Rangers	42	17	9	16	72	71	1.014	43	
11	Charlton Athletic	42	15	13	14	60	70	0.857	43	
12	Brentford	42	16	8	18	76	74	1.027	40	
13	Luton Town	42	16	7	19	94	87	1.080	39	
14	Bournemouth & Boscombe Athletic	42	13	12	17	72	79	0.911	38	
15	Watford	42	14	10	18	68	78	0.872	38	
16	Gillingham	42	13	11	18	62	81	0.765	37	
17	Norwich City	42	10	16	16	66	70	0.943	36	
18	Walsall	42	12	9	21	75	101	0.743	33	
19	Bristol Rovers	42	14	4	24	67	93	0.720	32	
20	Coventry City	42	11	9	22	67	96	0.698	31	
21	Merthyr Town	42	9	13	20	53	91	0.582	31	Re-elected
22	Torquay United	42	8	14	20	53	103	0.515	30	Re-elected

(C) Champions; (P) Promoted

=== Top goalscorers ===
First Division

- Dixie Dean (Everton) – 60 goals

Second Division

- Jimmy Cookson (West Bromwich Albion) – 38 goals

Third Division North

- Joe Smith (Stockport County) – 38 goals

Third Division South

- Harry Morris (Swindon Town) – 38 goals
