= Arthur Chadwick =

English footballer (1875–1936)

Personal information
- Date of birth: 31 July 1875
- Place of birth: Church, Lancashire, England
- Date of death: 21 March 1936 (aged 60)
- Place of death: Exeter, England
- Position: Centre-half

Youth career
- Church
- Accrington

Senior career*
Years	Team	Apps	(Gls)
1895–1897	Burton Swifts	55	(7)
1897–1901	Southampton	81	(6)
1901–1904	Portsmouth	70	(12)
1904–1906	Northampton Town		
1906–1908	Accrington Stanley		
1908–1910	Exeter City		

International career
1900	England	2	(0)

Managerial career
- 1908–1922: Exeter City
- 1923–1925: Reading
- 1925–1931: Southampton
- * Club domestic league appearances and goals

Arthur Chadwick (July 1875 – 21 March 1936) was a professional footballer whose playing career as a centre-half included spells at Portsmouth and Southampton, before going on to be manager at Exeter City, Reading and Southampton. He also made two appearances for England in 1900.

== Playing career ==
Chadwick was born in Church, Lancashire and started his career playing in his native county for Accrington and Burton Swifts. When he signed for Southampton in May 1897, little was known about him. He travelled to Southampton for a trial accompanied by Bob Brown of Burton Wanderers.

=== Southampton ===
Chadwick initially played at right-half, but was not a great success until he was converted to a centre-half in which position his career took off. Described in Holley & Chalk's The Alphabet of the Saints as "a powerful and efficient defender, Arthur reached his peak at the turn of the century". He helped Saints to win the Southern League title in 1897–98 and again in 1898–99 and to the FA Cup final in 1900, defeating three top flight clubs along the way, by when he had been rewarded with two England caps, against Scotland and Wales. Southampton again won the Southern League title in 1900–01 before Chadwick decided to move on.

In January 1899, in a match at Sheppey United, Chadwick became the first Saints player to be sent off in a League match.

In his four seasons with Southampton, he made a total of 96 appearances, scoring six goals.

=== Portsmouth ===
In May 1901 Chadwick moved to local rivals, Portsmouth, and was part of their side who won the Southern League title in 1901–02.

=== Later career ===
In 1904 Chadwick moved on to Northampton Town, and then returned to Accrington Stanley before joining Exeter City, where he finished his playing career in 1910, although by now he was acting as manager.

== Managerial career ==
=== Exeter City ===
In 1910, Chadwick became the first manager of Exeter City, a post he held for 12 years until December 1922.

When he first joined Exeter, they had recently joined the Southern League, and in 1920 Exeter City were invited by the Football League to become founder members of the Third Division.

=== Reading ===
In January 1923, Chadwick was at the helm of Reading, where he guided the club through two seasons in the Third Division. He is credited with signing most of the players that won promotion to Division 2 in 1926.

=== Southampton ===
When the manager's job at Second Division Southampton became vacant in October 1925, Chadwick resigned his post at Reading to take charge at The Dell, thus becoming the first ex-player to become manager.

He found immediate success by guiding the Saints to the semi-final of the 1927 FA Cup, defeating Newcastle United on the way. In the semi-final, played at Stamford Bridge on 26 March 1927, Saints were eliminated 2–1 by Arsenal with Saints' goal coming from Bill Rawlings. In this match, Saints came up against their former star full-back Tom Parker who had had a nightmare in Saints' previous semi-final appearance two years earlier. This time Parker was on the winning side as Arsenal moved on to Wembley, losing to Cardiff City in the final.

Shrewdly Chadwick bought several new players, including forward Willie Haines from Portsmouth and by the end of the 1928–29 season, he had taken Southampton to fourth place, their then best ever position in Division 2. Soon after, Saints embarked on a policy of selling their best players to survive financially, and Chadwick grew disillusioned with both the club in particular and the game of football in general and he resigned on 16 April 1931, thereby ending a long association with the game.

== After football ==
Chadwick left Hampshire and settled in Exeter, where in 1936 he collapsed and died whilst watching a match at Exeter's ground.

== Family ==
His cousin, Edgar Chadwick also played for England as well as for Everton and Southampton. He also had a brother, Albert who was an apprentice with Everton, making five appearances between 1888 and 1892.

== Honours ==
Southampton

- FA Cup finalist: 1900
- Southern League championships: 1897–98, 1898–99, 1900–01

Portsmouth

- Southern League championships: 1901–02
