= 1934–35 Southampton F.C. season =

English football club season

Southampton F.C.
1934–35 season
- Chairman: Sloane Stanley
- Manager: George Kay
- Stadium: The Dell
- Second Division: 19th
- FA Cup: Fourth round
- Top goalscorer: League: Laurie Fishlock (7); All: Laurie Fishlock (9)
- Highest home attendance: 18,351 v Swansea Town (26 December 1934)
- Lowest home attendance: 4,800 v Notts County (22 September 1934)
- Average home league attendance: 9,118
- Biggest win: 3–0 v Hull City (15 September 1934); 4–1 v Bradford Park Avenue (10 November 1934)
- Biggest defeat: 1–6 v Sheffield United (16 February 1935)
Home colours

The 1934–35 season was the 40th season of competitive football by Southampton, and the club's 13th in the Second Division of the Football League. The season was the Saints' worst league campaign since they were promoted to the second flight in 1923, as they finished in 19th place just two places and eight points above the relegation spots. With a lack of high-scoring forwards and injuries to players across the squad, the side struggled to pick up wins throughout the season; in the first half of the campaign, they continued their run without an away win that had encompassed the whole of the previous season, finally ending it after 33 winless fixtures with victory over Swansea Town on Christmas Day 1934. Southampton finished the season with 11 wins, 12 draws and 19 losses – their lowest win rate since the 1911–12 season.

In the 1934–35 FA Cup, Southampton entered the third round with an away fixture against Third Division North side Walsall, who they beat 2–1 thanks to a brace from Laurie Fishlock. In their first fourth round fixture since 1926–27, the Saints lost 0–3 to First Division strugglers Birmingham, in front of a new club record attendance of 28,291. As in previous seasons, the club ended the season with two local tournaments: the Hampshire Combination Cup and the combined Benevolent and Rowland Hospital Cups. In the former, the Saints lost 2–4 at Bournemouth & Boscombe Athletic in the semi-final. In the latter, they also lost to top-flight rivals Portsmouth, who scored the only goal of the game. Southampton's only friendly match during the 1934–35 campaign saw them drawing 2–2 with French side Le Havre AC in March.

Southampton used 23 different players during the 1934–35 season and had 13 different goalscorers. Their top scorer was left winger Laurie Fishlock, who scored seven goals in the Second Division and two in the FA Cup. Centre-forward Norman Cole scored eight times in the league, followed by centre-half Johnny McIlwaine on seven league goals during the campaign. Nine players were signed by the club during the season, with six released and sold to other clubs. The average attendance at The Dell during the 1934–35 season was 9,118. The highest attendance of the season was 28,291 in the FA Cup against Birmingham; the highest attendance in the league was significantly lower – 18,351 against Swansea Town on Boxing Day. The lowest attendance of the season was 4,800 against Notts County on 22 September.

== Background and transfers ==
With mounting financial problems, transfer activity was limited for Southampton ahead of the 1934–35 season. At the end of the previous campaign, two amateur players – inside-left Herbert Coates and inside-right Vivian Gibbins – left to join Athenian League side Leyton. Outside-left Ben Burley, who had made his first-team debut in the last two games of the previous season, also left in June for Grimsby Town, who had recently been promoted to the First Division. Another inside-left out of contention, Tom Ruddy, left for Spennymoor United in the North Eastern League the next month. Both left-sided forward positions were targeted as part of the club's only two signings prior to the start of the season – Alf Wheeler joined from Northampton Town in July and Doug Rowe moved to The Dell from Lincoln City in August.

Southampton's headline signing came just after the start of the league campaign, however, as Laurie Fishlock was brought in from Millwall (who had been relegated from the Second Division last season) as first choice outside-left in September. James Horton also joined from Millwall around the same time, although only made one appearance during the season at centre-forward in the FA Cup fourth round against Birmingham the following January. Also in September, Joe Cummins – who had joined less than a year earlier but made just one appearance during the campaign before succumbing to injury – left to join French club CA Paris-Charenton. In October, after just two months at the club, Rowe also left for France when he joined US Tourquennoise, having lost in place in the starting lineup upon Fishlock's arrival. With the club struggling to score goals in the league, in December they signed Walter Pollard from Fulham, for whom he had failed to make an appearance; he played regularly in both inside-forward roles in the second half of the season, but only scored one goal. Bob Reid also joined on amateur terms from Southwick in Sussex, turning professional the next month and making one appearance in the FA Cup fourth round fixture.

Players transferred in

Name	Nationality	Pos.	Club	Date	Fee	Ref.
Alf Wheeler	England	FW	(England) Northampton Town	July 1934	Unknown	
Donovan Browning	England	FB	(England) Crystal Palace	August 1934	Free (Note: Donovan Browning initially joined on amateur terms in August 1934, before turning professional the following May.)	
Doug Rowe	England	FW	(England) Lincoln City	August 1934	Unknown	
Lionel Bowen	England	FB	(England) Crystal Palace	September 1934	Free (Note: Lionel Bowen initially joined on amateur terms in September 1934, before turning professional the following month.)	
Laurie Fishlock	England	FW	(England) Millwall	September 1934	Unknown	
Doug Henderson	England	FB	(England) Park Avenue	September 1934	Free (Note: Doug Henderson initially joined on amateur terms.)	
James Horton	England	FW	(England) Millwall	September 1934	Unknown	
Walter Pollard	England	FW	(England) Fulham	December 1934	Unknown	
Bob Reid	England	FW	(England) Southwick	December 1934	Free (Note: Bob Reid initially joined on amateur terms in December 1934, before turning professional in January 1935.)	

Players transferred out

Name	Nationality	Pos.	Club	Date	Fee	Ref.
Herbert Coates	England	FW	(England) Leyton	Summer 1934	Free	
Vivian Gibbins	England	FW	(England) Leyton	Summer 1934	Free	
Ben Burley	England	FW	(England) Grimsby Town	June 1934	Unknown	
Tom Ruddy	England	FW	(England) Spennymoor United	July 1934	Unknown	
Joe Cummins	England	FW	(France) CA Paris-Charenton	September 1934	Unknown	
Doug Rowe	England	FW	(France) US Tourquennoise	October 1934	Unknown	

== Second Division ==
Southampton begun the 1934–35 league campaign as poorly as they had ended the previous, picking up just two points from their first five games in home draws with fellow mid-table sides Port Vale and Oldham Athletic, to find themselves at the bottom end of the table. In the return leg against Port Vale at the Old Recreation Ground, debutant winger Laurie Fishlock scored the only Saints goal in a 1–4 loss, which was followed a few days later by a 0–4 thrashing at the hands of Bolton Wanderers. The club's sole win in their first ten games came against Hull City, who they beat 3–0 thanks to goals from Bill Adams, Tom Brewis and Fishlock. A surprise 1–0 win over eventual league champions Brentford in October and a convincing 4–1 victory over Bradford Park Avenue a couple of weeks later (in which recent arrival Alf Wheeler scored a hat-trick) saw the team move away from the relegation spots, but by mid-December they were back just one point above the drop zone after picking up a solitary point from their next five fixtures.

In the Christmas week, Southampton beat Bury 2–1 at home, then ended their 33-game streak without an away win on Christmas Day, when they scored the only goal of the game against Swansea Town (a feat which they repeated at home the next day). After moving up to 12th in the league after a 2–0 win at Oldham Athletic on 5 January, Southampton began to plummet back down the league table with a winless run extending into late-March, including a 1–3 loss at bottom-ranked Notts County, a season-record 1–6 defeat at the hands of mid-table Sheffield United, and home losses against Barnsley and Nottingham Forest. By the time they won their next game, 1–0 against Plymouth Argyle at The Dell on 30 March 1935, Southampton were struggling in 20th place in the league table, just six points above the first relegation spot. The club won their last three home fixtures of the season, against Newcastle United, Manchester United and Blackpool, to ensure their safety in the Second Division with a 19th-place finish.

=== List of match results ===
25 August 1934 1	Burnley	3–0	Southampton	Burnley
				Stadium: Turf Moor; Attendance: 12,000

27 August 1934 2	Southampton	0–0	Port Vale	Southampton
				Stadium: The Dell; Attendance: 7,000

1 September 1934 3	Southampton	2–2	Oldham Athletic	Southampton
	Rowe; Cole			Stadium: The Dell; Attendance: 7,042

3 September 1934 4	Port Vale	4–1	Southampton	Stoke-on-Trent
			Fishlock	Stadium: Old Recreation Ground; Attendance: 7,746

8 September 1934 5	Bolton Wanderers	4–0	Southampton	Bolton
				Stadium: Burnden Park; Attendance: 17,000

15 September 1934 6	Southampton	3–0	Hull City	Southampton
	Adams; Brewis; Fishlock			Stadium: The Dell; Attendance: 6,500

22 September 1934 7	Southampton	1–1	Notts County	Southampton
	Brewis			Stadium: The Dell; Attendance: 4,800

29 September 1934 8	Bradford City	1–1	Southampton	Bradford
			Wheeler	Stadium: Valley Parade; Attendance: 9,000

6 October 1934 9	Southampton	1–1	Sheffield United	Southampton
	Tully			Stadium: The Dell; Attendance: 9,913

13 October 1934 10	Barnsley	1–1	Southampton	Barnsley
			Cole	Stadium: Oakwell; Attendance: 8,000

20 October 1934 11	Nottingham Forest	3–1	Southampton	Nottingham
			Cole	Stadium: City Ground; Attendance: 10,000

27 October 1934 12	Southampton	1–0	Brentford	Southampton
	Tully			Stadium: The Dell; Attendance: 10,415

3 November 1934 13	Fulham	3–3	Southampton	London
			McIlwaine; Luckett; Horton	Stadium: Craven Cottage; Attendance: 20,000

10 November 1934 14	Southampton	4–1	Bradford Park Avenue	Southampton
	Wheeler; Fishlock			Stadium: The Dell; Attendance: 10,000

17 November 1934 15	Plymouth Argyle	4–0	Southampton	Plymouth
				Stadium: Home Park; Attendance: 17,501

24 November 1934 16	Southampton	1–4	Norwich City	Southampton
	Wheeler			Stadium: The Dell; Attendance: 11,400

1 December 1934 17	Newcastle United	1–0	Southampton	Newcastle-upon-Tyne
				Stadium: St James' Park; Attendance: 13,000

8 December 1934 18	Southampton	2–2	West Ham United	Southampton
	Cole; Fishlock			Stadium: The Dell; Attendance: 8,500

15 December 1934 19	Blackpool	4–1	Southampton	Blackpool
			Fishlock	Stadium: Bloomfield Road; Attendance: 10,000

22 December 1934 20	Southampton	2–1	Bury	Southampton
	Cole			Stadium: The Dell; Attendance: 7,300

25 December 1934 21	Swansea Town	0–1	Southampton	Swansea
			Fishlock	Stadium: Vetch Field; Attendance: 2,000

26 December 1934 22	Southampton	1–0	Swansea Town	Southampton
	Wheeler			Stadium: The Dell; Attendance: 18,351

29 December 1934 23	Southampton	0–0	Burnley	Southampton
				Stadium: The Dell; Attendance: 11,257

1 January 1935 24	Manchester United	3–0	Southampton	Manchester
				Stadium: Old Trafford; Attendance: 15,174

5 January 1935 25	Oldham Athletic	0–2	Southampton	Oldham
			Cole	Stadium: Boundary Park; Attendance: 7,000

19 January 1935 26	Southampton	1–2	Bolton Wanderers	Southampton
	Neal			Stadium: The Dell; Attendance: 16,575

31 January 1935 27	Hull City	0–0	Southampton	Kingston upon Hull
				Stadium: Boothferry Park; Attendance: 5,130

2 February 1935 28	Notts County	3–1	Southampton	Nottingham
			Tully	Stadium: Meadow Lane; Attendance: 11,000

9 February 1935 29	Southampton	1–1	Bradford City	Southampton
	Holt			Stadium: The Dell; Attendance: 6,472

16 February 1935 30	Sheffield United	6–1	Southampton	Sheffield
			Pollard	Stadium: Bramall Lane; Attendance: 5,000

23 February 1935 31	Southampton	0–1	Barnsley	Southampton
				Stadium: The Dell; Attendance: 5,625

2 March 1935 32	Southampton	1–2	Nottingham Forest	Southampton
	McIlwaine			Stadium: The Dell; Attendance: 5,790

9 March 1935 33	Brentford	3–2	Southampton	London
			Neal; Brewis	Stadium: Griffin Park; Attendance: 13,111

16 March 1935 34	Southampton	1–1	Fulham	Southampton
	McIlwaine			Stadium: The Dell; Attendance: 8,946

23 March 1935 35	Bradford Park Avenue	3–1	Southampton	Bradford
			Neal	Stadium: Horsfall Stadium; Attendance: 5,000

30 March 1935 36	Southampton	1–0	Plymouth Argyle	Southampton
	McIlwaine			Stadium: The Dell; Attendance: 7,271

6 April 1935 37	Norwich City	4–0	Southampton	Norwich
				Stadium: The Nest (football ground); Attendance: 8,000

13 April 1935 38	Southampton	2–0	Newcastle United	Southampton
	Tully; McIlwaine			Stadium: The Dell; Attendance: 9,125

20 April 1935 39	West Ham United	2–1	Southampton	London
			Fishlock	Stadium: Boleyn Ground; Attendance: 31,000

22 April 1935 40	Southampton	1–0	Manchester United	Southampton
	McIlwaine			Stadium: The Dell; Attendance: 12,458

27 April 1935 41	Southampton	2–0	Blackpool	Southampton
	Woodhouse; McIlwaine			Stadium: The Dell; Attendance: 6,758

4 May 1935 42	Bury	4–1	Southampton	Bury
			Holt	Stadium: Gigg Lane; Attendance: 5,000

=== Final league table ===
Pos	Team	Pld	W	D	L	GF	GA	GAv	Pts	Promotion or relegation
17	Swansea Town	42	14	8	20	56	67	0.836	36	
18	Port Vale	42	11	12	19	55	74	0.743	34	
19	Southampton	42	11	12	19	46	75	0.613	34	
20	Bradford City	42	12	8	22	50	68	0.735	32	
21	Oldham Athletic (R)	42	10	6	26	56	95	0.589	26	Relegation to the Third Division North

Source: RSSSF
Rules for classification: 1) Points; 2) Goal average; 3) Goals scored
(R) Relegated

=== Results by matchday ===
Round	1	2	3	4	5	6	7	8	9	10	11	12	13	14	15	16	17	18	19	20	21	22	23	24	25	26	27	28	29	30	31	32	33	34	35	36	37	38	39	40	41	42
Ground	A	H	H	A	A	H	H	A	H	A	A	H	A	H	A	H	A	H	A	H	A	H	H	A	A	H	A	A	H	A	H	H	A	H	A	H	A	H	A	H	H	A
Result	L	D	D	L	L	W	D	D	D	D	L	W	D	W	L	L	L	D	L	W	W	W	D	L	W	L	D	L	D	L	L	L	L	D	L	W	L	W	L	W	W	L
Position	20	15	18	19	20	18	19	18	18	17	17	18	18	15	17	19	19	20	20	17	14	12	13	14	12	14	14	15	15	16	17	18	19	19	20	20	20	19	19	19	18	19

Source: 11v11.com
A = Away; H = Home; W = Win; D = Draw; L = Loss

== FA Cup ==
Southampton were drawn in the third round of the 1934–35 FA Cup against Third Division North side Walsall. The hosts went ahead through Gilbert Alsop, but the Saints responded through a Laurie Fishlock brace to win for the first time in the tournament since 1927. In the fourth round, the Saints hosted First Division side Birmingham, attracting a new club record attendance of 28,291. With their top goalscorer Fishlock injured, however, the side lacked firepower as he was replaced by young amateur Bob Reid, who was described by club historians as "overawed by the experience". Birmingham won the game 3–0, scoring two goals in the first half and the third in the second, as Southampton were knocked out of the fourth round, to which they didn't return until after the Second World War.

12 January 1935 Round 3	Walsall	1–2	Southampton	Walsall
	Alsop		Fishlock	Stadium: Fellows Park; Attendance: 14,475

26 January 1935 Round 4	Southampton	0–3	Birmingham	Southampton
				Stadium: The Dell; Attendance: 28,291

== Other matches ==
Outside of the league and the FA Cup, Southampton played three additional first-team matches during the 1934–35 season. The first was a friendly against French club Le Havre AC on 5 March 1935, which ended in a 2–2 draw including goals from Arthur Holt and Fred Tully. The next month, the team played the semi-final of the third annual Hampshire Combination Cup against Bournemouth & Boscombe Athletic at Dean Court. Despite struggling towards the bottom of the division below the Saints, the Third Division South hosts won the game 4–2 to advance to the final of the competition, with Johnny McIlwaine scoring both consolations for the visitors. In the final game of the season, four days after the league had concluded, the Saints lost 0–1 at Portsmouth for the 1935 combined Hampshire Benevolent Cup and Rowland Hospital Cup. Septimus Rutherford scored the only goal of the game in front of a lacklustre crowd of 2,215, extending Southampton's winless run in the competition to six years.

5 March 1935 Friendly	Le Havre AC	2–2	Southampton	Le Havre, France
			Holt; Tully	Stadium: Stade Jules Deschaseaux

3 April 1935 Hampshire CC Semi-Final	Bournemouth & Boscombe Athletic	4–2	Southampton	Bournemouth
			McIlwaine	Stadium: Dean Court

8 May 1935 Hampshire BC/Rowland HC	Portsmouth	1–0	Southampton	Portsmouth
				Stadium: Fratton Park; Attendance: 2,215

== Player details ==
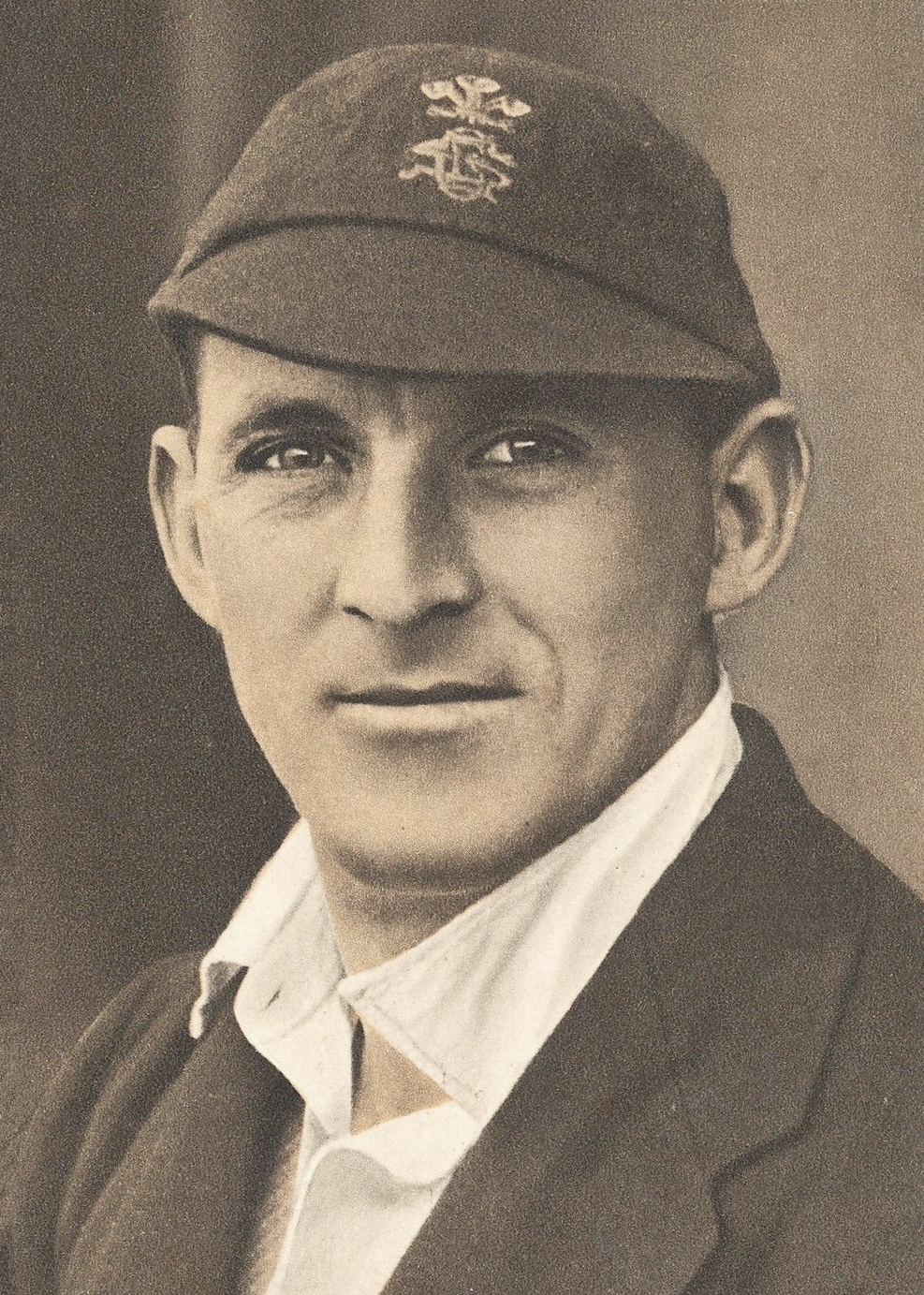
Laurie Fishlock was Southampton's top scorer in 1934–35, with seven goals in the league and two in the FA Cup.

Southampton used 23 different players during the 1934–35 season, thirteen of whom scored during the campaign. The team played in a 2–3–5 formation throughout, using two full-backs, three half-backs, two outside forwards, two inside forwards and a centre-forward. Outside-right Fred Tully appeared in all but two of the club's league games during the campaign, followed by right-back Charlie Sillett who played in 39 league and both FA Cup games. Outside-left Laurie Fishlock finished as the season's top scorer with seven goals in the Second Division and two in the FA Cup, followed by centre-forward Norman Cole on eight goals, then centre-half Johnny McIlwaine on seven.

=== Squad statistics ===
Name	Pos.	Nat.	League		FA Cup		Total	
Name	Pos.	Nat.	Apps.	Gls.	Apps.	Gls.	Apps.	Gls.
Bill Adams	HB	(England)	25	1	2	0	27	1
Arthur Bradford	HB	(England)	20	0	0	0	20	0
Tom Brewis	FW	(England)	27	3	0	0	27	3
Frank Campbell	HB	(Scotland)	1	0	0	0	1	0
Norman Cole	FW	(England)	24	8	1	0	25	8
Laurie Fishlock	FW	(England)	28	7	1	2	29	9
James Horton	FW	(England)	0	0	1	0	1	0
Arthur Holt	FW	(England)	27	2	2	0	29	2
Cyril King	HB	(England)	13	0	2	0	15	0
Billy Light	GK	(England)	9	0	0	0	9	0
Bill Luckett	HB	(England)	38	1	2	0	40	1
Johnny McIlwaine	HB	(Scotland)	24	7	2	0	26	7
Dick Neal	FW	(England)	22	3	2	0	24	3
Walter Pollard	FW	(England)	10	1	0	0	10	1
Bob Reid	FW	(England)	0	0	1	0	1	0
Arthur Roberts	FB	(England)	16	0	0	0	16	0
Bert Scriven	GK	(England)	33	0	2	0	35	0
Charlie Sillett	FB	(England)	39	0	2	0	41	0
Fred Tully	FW	(England)	40	4	2	0	42	4
Frank Ward	FB	(England)	17	0	0	0	17	0
Alf Wheeler	FW	(England)	11	6	0	0	11	6
Stan Woodhouse	HB	(England)	22	1	0	0	22	1
Players with appearances who left before the end of the season
Doug Rowe	FW	(England)	2	1	0	0	2	1

=== Most appearances ===
Rank	Name	Pos.	League		FA Cup		Total	
Rank	Name	Pos.	Apps.	%	Apps.	%	Apps.	%
1	Fred Tully	FW	40	95.24	2	100.00	42	97.67
2	Charlie Sillett	FB	39	92.86	2	100.00	41	95.35
3	Bill Luckett	HB	38	90.48	2	100.00	40	93.02
4	Bert Scriven	GK	33	78.57	2	100.00	35	81.40
5	Laurie Fishlock	FW	28	66.67	1	50.00	29	67.44
5	Arthur Holt	FW	27	64.29	2	100.00	29	67.44
7	Tom Brewis	FW	27	64.29	0	0.00	27	62.79
7	Bill Adams	HB	25	59.52	2	100.00	27	62.79
9	Johnny McIlwaine	HB	24	57.14	2	100.00	26	60.47
10	Norman Cole	FW	24	57.14	1	50.00	25	58.14

=== Top goalscorers ===
Rank	Name	Pos.	League		FA Cup		Total	
Rank	Name	Pos.	Gls.	GPG	Gls.	GPG	Gls.	GPG
1	Laurie Fishlock	FW	7	0.25	2	2.00	9	0.31
2	Norman Cole	FW	8	0.33	0	0.00	8	0.32
3	Johnny McIlwaine	HB	7	0.29	0	0.00	7	0.27
4	Alf Wheeler	FW	6	0.55	0	0.00	6	0.55
5	Fred Tully	FW	4	0.10	0	0.00	4	0.10
6	Dick Neal	FW	3	0.14	0	0.00	3	0.13
6	Tom Brewis	FW	3	0.11	0	0.00	3	0.11
8	Arthur Holt	FW	2	0.07	0	0.00	2	0.07
9	Doug Rowe	FW	1	0.50	0	0.00	1	0.50
9	Walter Pollard	FW	1	0.10	0	0.00	1	0.10
9	Stan Woodhouse	HB	1	0.05	0	0.00	1	0.05
9	Bill Adams	HB	1	0.04	0	0.00	1	0.04
9	Bill Luckett	HB	1	0.03	0	0.00	1	0.03

== Bibliography ==
- Chalk, Gary; Holley, Duncan (10 August 1987), A Complete Record of Southampton Football Club: 1885–1987, Derby, England: Breedon Books, ISBN 978-0907969228
- Chalk, Gary; Holley, Duncan; Bull, David (28 November 2013), All the Saints: A Complete Who's Who of Southampton FC, Bristol, England: Hagiology Publishing, ISBN 978-0992686406
- Juson, Dave; Aldworth, Clay; Bendel, Barry; Bull, David; Chalk, Gary (10 November 2004), Saints v Pompey: A History of Unrelenting Rivalry, Bristol, England: Hagiology Publishing, ISBN 978-0953447459
