= 1935–36 Southampton F.C. season =

English football club season

Southampton F.C.
1935–36 season
- Chairman: Sloane Stanley
- Manager: George Kay
- Stadium: The Dell
- Second Division: 17th
- FA Cup: Third round
- Top goalscorer: League: Vic Watson (14); All: Vic Watson (14)
- Highest home attendance: 21,333 v Tottenham Hotspur (23 November 1935)
- Lowest home attendance: 1,875 v Port Vale (30 March 1936)
- Average home league attendance: 10,600
- Biggest win: 7–2 v Nottingham Forest (15 February 1936)
- Biggest defeat: 0–8 v Tottenham Hotspur (28 March 1936)
Home colours

The 1935–36 season was the 41st season of competitive football by Southampton, the club's 14th in the Second Division of the Football League, and the 50th season overall since the club's formation. Despite a strong start, the season was another lacklustre performance by the side, as they finished 17th in the league table just five points above the first relegation spot. After signing West Ham United centre-forward Vic Watson in the summer of 1935, the team won four of their first six games and briefly occupied the top spot in the league; however, a poor run of form running from October to December saw them drop back to the bottom half of the table, where they stayed for the rest of the campaign. Southampton finished the season with 14 wins, nine draws and 19 losses, equal on points with the clubs in 15th, 16th and 18th places.

In the 1935–36 FA Cup, Southampton entered the third round with an away fixture against First Division side Middlesbrough, against whom they lost 0–1 to exit the tournament at the first hurdle as they had done in so many recent seasons. Aside from the league and the FA Cup, the club played in two local tournaments, the Hampshire Combination Cup and the Hampshire Benevolent Cup. In the former, the Saints were knocked out of the semi-finals by Third Division South side Aldershot, who beat the second-flight side 4–0. In the latter, the club hosted top-flight local rivals Portsmouth but lost 1–2, extending their winless run in the tournament to seven years. Southampton's only friendly game of the campaign saw them hosting First Division side Wolverhampton Wanderers in January, with the higher division side beating the Saints 3–2.

Southampton used 20 different players during the 1935–36 season and had ten different goalscorers. Their top scorer was new centre-forward Vic Watson, who scored 14 goals in the Second Division campaign. Inside-forward Arthur Holt followed Watson with 13 goals in the league, ahead of 1934–35 top scorer Laurie Fishlock on seven goals. The club signed only two new players in time for the start of the season, while six players left the club during the year. The average attendance at The Dell during 1935–36 was 10,600. The highest attendance of the season was 21,333 in the club's official jubilee match against Tottenham Hotspur on 23 November 1935. The lowest attendance of the season was a record-low 1,875 against Port Vale on 30 March 1936, two days after the club's new heaviest league defeat, 0–8 against Tottenham.

== Background and transfers ==
Ahead of the 1935–36 season starting, Southampton signed only two new players. In June 1935, they signed Vic Watson from West Ham United, who had missed out on promotion the previous season on goal average only, as their new first-choice centre-forward. He took the place of last season's primary centre-forward Norman Cole, who had moved to Norwich City. The club's second signing, in July, was half-back/forward Jack Gurry from recently relegated Leicester City. Also leaving Southampton in the summer were wing-half Frank Campbell, who had suffered a knee injury that developed into chronic arthritis which prevented him from continuing to play professionally (he subsequently joined Isle of Wight club Newport); wing-half Frank Ward, who left on a free transfer to Southern League side Folkestone; and out-of-favour inside-forward Alf Wheeler, who remained in the Second Division with Barnsley. In October, the club also sold forward James Horton to Aldershot, after just one season in which he only made a handful of appearances.

Towards the end of the season, Southampton surprisingly sold third first-choice goalkeeper Billy Light – who had played in every single match of the season so far – to West Bromwich Albion, who were struggling in the First Division. To bring Light to the club, West Brom paid Southampton a transfer fee of £2,000 – a new English record fee for a goalkeeper. The decision to sell Light was unpopular amongst Saints fans, who had seen several high-profile players sold in recent seasons – club historians have reflected that the sale "naturally displeased fans", and claimed that it led to a "storm of protest".

Players transferred in

Name	Nationality	Pos.	Club	Date	Fee	Ref.
Vic Watson	England	FW	(England) West Ham United	June 1935	Unknown	
Jack Gurry	England	HB	(England) Leicester City	July 1935	Unknown	

Players transferred out

Name	Nationality	Pos.	Club	Date	Fee	Ref.
Frank Campbell	England	HB	(England) Newport (Isle of Wight)	Summer 1935	Unknown	
Norman Cole	England	FW	(England) Norwich City	May 1935	Unknown	
Frank Ward	England	HB	(England) Folkestone	August 1935	Free	
Alf Wheeler	England	FW	(England) Barnsley	August 1935	Unknown	
James Horton	England	FW	(England) Aldershot	October 1935	Unknown	
Billy Light	England	GK	(England) West Bromwich Albion	March 1936	£2,000 (Note: Billy Light's £2,000 transfer fee was an English record for a goalkeeper at the time.)	

== Second Division ==
Southampton's strong run at the end of the 1934–35 season continued at the beginning of 1935–36, as they went unbeaten for the first six fixtures and picked up four wins to start off at the top of the league table. Early victories included a hard-fought 4–3 against Swansea Town on the opening day (in which Vic Watson scored on his Saints debut), a 1–0 double over recently-promoted Doncaster Rovers, and a 3–0 defeat of Bradford Park Avenue. The run of form was short-lived, however, and the Saints dropped into the mid-table region with just one win from their next eight games, five of which were defeats. Most of the losses were against fellow mid-table sides (namely, Sheffield United, Nottingham Forest, Fulham and Burnley), but ended with a surprising 2–5 loss at home to Charlton Athletic, who had just been promoted after winning the Third Division South. On 23 November, 50 years and two days after the club's very first match, Southampton picked up a 2–0 win over Tottenham Hotspur to mark their jubilee.

The win against Tottenham was the last for Southampton in 1935, however, as they went on a winless run extending into the new year which saw them drop from 8th to 14th in the Second Division standings. The eight-match run between 30 November and 1 January saw the Saints fall victim to a goal drought, as they scored just three times across the fixtures which included five 0–0 draws, a 2–4 defeat at Newcastle United, and home losses against Barnsley and West Ham United. A 1–0 win over promotion hopefuls Leicester City on 4 January kept the side in the fight for a top-half finish, however this was followed by four straight defeats which saw them dropping all the way to 17th in the table. Despite this poor run, the Saints picked up their biggest win of the season when they beat Nottingham Forest 7–2 at The Dell, with Watson scoring a hat-trick. The team's form continued to be inconsistent, as they hovered around the bottom third of the table, with a few narrow wins keeping them out of the relegation zone.

On 28 March 1936, Southampton suffered their heaviest league defeat to date when they lost 0–8 against Tottenham Hotspur at White Hart Lane. Joe Meek and George Hunt scored hat-tricks for Spurs, with the other two goals registered by Willie Evans. This would remain the club's biggest league defeat – equalled at the hands of Everton in the 1971–72 season – until they lost 0–9 to Leicester City in the Premier League in 2019. The next home game, a 0–1 loss against Port Vale two days later, saw the attendance at The Dell drop to a record-low 1,875 people. Despite this thrashing, the club responded in the final run-in with three wins from their last six fixtures, beating top-third sides Plymouth Argyle, Fulham and Blackpool to ensure their safety in the division. Ultimately, the Saints finished the season 17th in the Second Division table with just three more points than the previous season, and only seven points above the first relegation place. Manager George Kay left after the season ended to join Liverpool.

=== List of match results ===
31 August 1935 1	Southampton	4–3	Swansea Town	Southampton
	McIlwaine; Pollard; Watson; Fishlock			Stadium: The Dell; Attendance: 12,528

2 September 1935 2	Doncaster Rovers	0–1	Southampton	Doncaster
			Fishlock	Stadium: Belle Vue; Attendance: 14,227

7 September 1935 3	Leicester City	1–1	Southampton	Leicester
			Neal	Stadium: Filbert Street; Attendance: 18,000

9 September 1935 4	Southampton	1–0	Doncaster Rovers	Southampton
	Watson			Stadium: The Dell; Attendance: 10,126

14 September 1935 5	Southampton	3–0	Bradford	Southampton
	Brewis; Pollard; Fishlock			Stadium: The Dell; Attendance: 15,315

16 September 1935 6	Southampton	0–0	Bury	Southampton
				Stadium: The Dell; Attendance: 10,320

21 September 1935 7	Sheffield United	2–1	Southampton	Sheffield
			Watson	Stadium: Bramall Lane; Attendance: 13,000

28 September 1935 8	Southampton	2–1	Manchester United	Southampton
	Holt; Fishlock			Stadium: The Dell; Attendance: 17,678

5 October 1935 9	Southampton	1–1	Norwich City	Southampton
	Watson			Stadium: The Dell; Attendance: 15,073

12 October 1935 10	Nottingham Forest	2–0	Southampton	Nottingham
				Stadium: City Ground; Attendance: 10,000

19 October 1935 11	Port Vale	0–2	Southampton	Stoke-on-Trent
			Watson	Stadium: Old Recreation Ground; Attendance: 5,000

26 October 1935 12	Southampton	1–2	Fulham	Southampton
	Holt			Stadium: The Dell; Attendance: 14,999

2 November 1935 13	Burnley	2–0	Southampton	Burnley
				Stadium: Turf Moor; Attendance: 8,524

9 November 1935 14	Southampton	2–5	Charlton Athletic	Southampton
	Sillett; Watson			Stadium: The Dell; Attendance: 11,050

16 November 1935 15	Hull City	2–2	Southampton	Kingston upon Hull
			Holt; Watson	Stadium: Anlaby Road; Attendance: 8,000

23 November 1935 16	Southampton	2–0	Tottenham Hotspur	Southampton
	Tully; Holt			Stadium: The Dell; Attendance: 21,333

30 November 1935 17	Plymouth Argyle	0–0	Southampton	Plymouth
				Stadium: Home Park; Attendance: 14,356

7 December 1935 18	Southampton	0–0	Bradford City	Southampton
				Stadium: The Dell; Attendance: 9,525

14 December 1935 19	Newcastle United	4–1	Southampton	Newcastle upon Tyne
			Brewis	Stadium: St James' Park; Attendance: 15,000

21 December 1935 20	Southampton	0–1	Barnsley	Southampton
				Stadium: The Dell; Attendance: 6,622

25 December 1935 21	West Ham United	0–0	Southampton	London
				Stadium: Boleyn Ground; Attendance: 27,609

26 December 1935 22	Southampton	2–4	West Ham United	Southampton
	Holt; Watson			Stadium: The Dell; Attendance: 18,967

28 December 1935 23	Swansea Town	0–0	Southampton	Swansea
				Stadium: Vetch Field; Attendance: 8,076

1 January 1936 24	Bury	0–0	Southampton	Bury
				Stadium: Gigg Lane; Attendance: 3,000

4 January 1936 25	Southampton	1–0	Leicester City	Southampton
	Neal			Stadium: The Dell; Attendance: 11,848

18 January 1936 26	Bradford	2–1	Southampton	Bradford
			Fishlock	Stadium: Park Avenue; Attendance: 8,548

1 February 1936 27	Manchester United	4–0	Southampton	Manchester
				Stadium: Old Trafford; Attendance: 20,000

5 February 1936 28	Southampton	0–1	Sheffield United	Southampton
				Stadium: The Dell; Attendance: 5,053

8 February 1936 29	Norwich City	5–1	Southampton	Norwich
			Holt	Stadium: The Nest; Attendance: 12,000

15 February 1936 30	Southampton	7–2	Nottingham Forest	Southampton
	Watson; Holt; Neal			Stadium: The Dell; Attendance: 5,253

29 February 1936 31	Bradford City	2–1	Southampton	Bradford
			Neal	Stadium: Valley Parade; Attendance: 5,000

7 March 1936 32	Southampton	1–0	Hull City	Southampton
	Fishlock			Stadium: The Dell; Attendance: 5,476

14 March 1936 33	Charlton Athletic	2–0	Southampton	London
				Stadium: The Valley; Attendance: 25,000

21 March 1936 34	Southampton	1–0	Burnley	Southampton
	Holt			Stadium: The Dell; Attendance: 5,095

28 March 1936 35	Tottenham Hotspur	8–0	Southampton	London
	Meek; Hunt; Evans			Stadium: White Hart Lane; Attendance: 28,907

30 March 1936 36	Southampton	0–1	Port Vale	Southampton
				Stadium: The Dell; Attendance: 1,875

4 April 1936 37	Southampton	2–0	Plymouth Argyle	Southampton
	Sillett; Holt			Stadium: The Dell; Attendance: 5,882

10 April 1936 38	Blackpool	2–1	Southampton	Blackpool
			King	Stadium: Bloomfield Road; Attendance: 18,447

11 April 1936 39	Fulham	0–2	Southampton	London
			Watson; Fishlock	Stadium: Craven Cottage; Attendance: 15,000

13 April 1936 40	Southampton	0–1	Blackpool	Southampton
	Holt			Stadium: The Dell; Attendance: 11,911

18 April 1936 41	Southampton	1–3	Newcastle United	Southampton
	Holt			Stadium: The Dell; Attendance: 6,670

25 April 1936 42	Barnsley	3–1	Southampton	Barnsley
			Watson	Stadium: Oakwell; Attendance: 5,202

=== Final league table ===
Pos	Team	Pld	W	D	L	GF	GA	GAv	Pts
15	Burnley	42	12	13	17	50	59	0.847	37
16	Bradford (Park Avenue)	42	14	9	19	62	84	0.738	37
17	Southampton	42	14	9	19	47	65	0.723	37
18	Doncaster Rovers	42	14	9	19	51	71	0.718	37
19	Nottingham Forest	42	12	11	19	69	76	0.908	35

Source: RSSSF
Rules for classification: 1) Points; 2) Goal average; 3) Goals scored

=== Results by matchday ===
Round	1	2	3	4	5	6	7	8	9	10	11	12	13	14	15	16	17	18	19	20	21	22	23	24	25	26	27	28	29	30	31	32	33	34	35	36	37	38	39	40	41	42
Ground	H	A	A	H	H	H	A	H	H	A	A	H	A	H	A	H	A	H	A	H	A	H	A	A	H	A	A	H	A	H	A	H	A	H	A	H	H	A	A	H	H	A
Result	W	W	D	W	W	D	L	W	D	L	W	L	L	L	D	W	D	D	L	L	D	L	D	D	W	L	L	L	L	W	L	W	L	W	L	L	W	L	W	W	L	L
Position	6	2	3	1	2	1	3	2	2	4	3	4	7	8	9	8	9	8	9	12	12	14	13	14	12	13	14	14	17	13	17	16	16	15	17	17	16	18	15	14	16	17

Source: 11v11.com
A = Away; H = Home; W = Win; D = Draw; L = Loss

== FA Cup ==
Southampton entered the 1935–36 FA Cup in the third round, travelling north to face First Division mid-table side Middlesbrough. In front of a crowd just shy of 30,000 at Ayresome Park, the Saints succumbed to a 0–1 defeat, with the only goal scored by winger Arthur Cunliffe while the visitors were "reorganising" following an injury to Johnny McIlwaine.

11 January 1936 Round 3	Middlesbrough	1–0	Southampton	Middlesbrough
	Cunliffe			Stadium: Ayresome Park; Attendance: 29,950

== Other matches ==
Outside of the league and the FA Cup, Southampton played three additional first-team matches during the 1935–36 season. The first was the semi-final of the annual Hampshire Combination Cup, for which they travelled to face nearby Third Division South club Aldershot, who thrashed the Second Division side 4–0. During a break in between league games in January, the club hosted a friendly match against top-flight Wolverhampton Wanderers, which they lost 2–3 despite goals from Laurie Fishlock and Vic Watson. Two days after the last game of the season, The Dell played host to the Hampshire Benevolent Cup charity match between the Saints and local rivals Portsmouth, having recently returned to its original single-branded format following three seasons combined with the Rowland Hospital Cup.

16 October 1935 Hampshire CC Semi-Final	Aldershot	4–0	Southampton	Aldershot
				Stadium: Recreation Ground

25 January 1936 Friendly	Southampton	2–3	Wolverhampton Wanderers	Southampton
	Fishlock; Watson			Stadium: The Dell

27 April 1936 Hampshire Benevolent Cup	Southampton	1–2	Portsmouth	Southampton
	Watson			Stadium: The Dell

== Player details ==
Southampton used 20 different players during the 1935–36 season, ten of whom scored during the campaign. The team played in a 2–3–5 formation throughout, using two full-backs, three half-backs, two outside forwards, two inside forwards and a centre-forward. Right-back Charlie Sillett featured in more games than any other player, being ever present with 43 appearances, followed by left-winger Laurie Fishlock who appeared in all but one league game. New centre-forward Vic Watson finished as the season's top scorer with 14 goals in the league, followed shortly by inside-forward Arthur Holt on 13 goals, then Fishlock (top scorer the previous season) on seven.

=== Squad statistics ===
Name	Pos.	Nat.	League		FA Cup		Total	
Name	Pos.	Nat.	Apps.	Gls.	Apps.	Gls.	Apps.	Gls.
Bill Adams	HB	(England)	17	0	1	0	18	0
Arthur Bradford	HB	(England)	12	0	0	0	12	0
Tom Brewis	FW	(England)	19	2	1	0	20	2
Norman Catlin	FW	(England)	5	0	0	0	5	0
Laurie Fishlock	FW	(England)	41	7	1	0	42	7
Jack Gurry	HB	(England)	9	0	0	0	9	0
Doug Henderson	FB	(England)	8	0	0	0	8	0
Arthur Holt	FW	(England)	37	13	1	0	38	13
Cyril King	HB	(England)	21	1	0	0	21	1
Bill Luckett	HB	(England)	19	0	0	0	19	0
Johnny McIlwaine	HB	(Scotland)	33	1	1	0	34	1
Dick Neal	FW	(England)	32	4	1	0	33	4
Walter Pollard	FW	(England)	13	2	0	0	13	2
Arthur Roberts	FB	(England)	32	0	1	0	33	0
Bert Scriven	GK	(England)	10	0	0	0	10	0
Charlie Sillett	FB	(England)	42	2	1	0	43	2
Fred Tully	FW	(England)	28	1	1	0	29	1
Vic Watson	FW	(England)	36	14	1	0	37	14
Stan Woodhouse	HB	(England)	16	0	0	0	16	0
Players with appearances who left before the end of the season
Billy Light	GK	(England)	32	0	1	0	33	0

=== Most appearances ===
Rank	Name	Pos.	League		FA Cup		Total	
Rank	Name	Pos.	Apps.	%	Apps.	%	Apps.	%
1	Charlie Sillett	FB	42	100.00	1	100.00	43	100.00
2	Laurie Fishlock	FW	41	97.62	1	100.00	42	97.67
3	Arthur Holt	FW	37	88.10	1	100.00	38	88.37
4	Vic Watson	FW	36	85.71	1	100.00	37	86.05
5	Johnny McIlwaine	HB	33	78.57	1	100.00	34	79.07
6	Billy Light	GK	32	76.19	1	100.00	33	76.74
6	Dick Neal	FW	32	76.19	1	100.00	33	76.74
6	Arthur Roberts	FB	32	76.19	1	100.00	33	76.74
9	Fred Tully	FW	28	66.67	1	100.00	29	67.44
10	Cyril King	HB	21	50.00	0	0.00	21	48.84

=== Top goalscorers ===
Rank	Name	Pos.	League		FA Cup		Total	
Rank	Name	Pos.	Gls.	GPG	Gls.	GPG	Gls.	GPG
1	Vic Watson	FW	14	0.39	0	0.00	14	0.38
2	Arthur Holt	FW	13	0.35	0	0.00	13	0.34
3	Laurie Fishlock	FW	7	0.17	0	0.00	7	0.17
4	Dick Neal	FW	4	0.13	0	0.00	4	0.12
5	Walter Pollard	FW	2	0.15	0	0.00	2	0.15
5	Tom Brewis	FW	2	0.11	0	0.00	2	0.10
5	Charlie Sillett	FB	2	0.05	0	0.00	2	0.05
8	Cyril King	HB	1	0.05	0	0.00	1	0.05
8	Fred Tully	FW	1	0.04	0	0.00	1	0.03
8	Johnny McIlwaine	HB	1	0.03	0	0.00	1	0.03

== Bibliography ==
- Chalk, Gary; Holley, Duncan (10 August 1987), A Complete Record of Southampton Football Club: 1885–1987, Derby, England: Breedon Books, ISBN 978-0907969228
- Chalk, Gary; Holley, Duncan; Bull, David (28 November 2013), All the Saints: A Complete Who's Who of Southampton FC, Bristol, England: Hagiology Publishing, ISBN 978-0992686406
- Juson, Dave; Aldworth, Clay; Bendel, Barry; Bull, David; Chalk, Gary (10 November 2004), Saints v Pompey: A History of Unrelenting Rivalry, Bristol, England: Hagiology Publishing, ISBN 978-0953447459
