= 1933–34 Southampton F.C. season =

English football club season

Southampton F.C.
1933–34 season
- Chairman: Sloane Stanley
- Manager: George Kay
- Stadium: The Dell
- Second Division: 14th
- FA Cup: Third round
- Top goalscorer: League: Ted Drake (22); All: Ted Drake (23)
- Highest home attendance: 24,797 v Fulham (26 December 1933)
- Lowest home attendance: 3,396 v Swansea Town (5 February 1934)
- Average home league attendance: 10,008
- Biggest win: 5–0 v Bradford Park Avenue (16 December 1933)
- Biggest defeat: 1–4 v Port Vale (6 January 1934); 1–4 v Nottingham Forest (14 April 1934)
Home colours

The 1933–34 season was the 39th season of competitive football by Southampton, and the club's 12th in the Second Division of the Football League. The season was another mediocre campaign for the Saints, who finished in the bottom half of the Second Division table for the fifth time since joining the league. The club equalled their Football League record of 15 home wins from 21 games, but failed to win a single away fixture all season, continuing a club record run of 33 games without an away which started late the last season and continued until December 1934. Despite starting the season strongly and spending months in the top half of the table, Southampton finished the 1933–34 season in 14th place with 15 wins, eight draws and 19 losses, just five points above Millwall in the first relegation spot.

In the 1933–34 FA Cup, Southampton entered the third round with a home fixture against Third Division South side Northampton Town. After a 1–1 draw at The Dell, the Saints lost by a single goal in the replay at the County Ground, exiting the tournament without a win for a club record seventh season running. As in the previous year, the club ended the season against local First Division rivals Portsmouth in a single game for the Hampshire Benevolent Cup and Rowland Hospital Cup, which they lost 4–1 at home. In the semi-final of the third annual Hampshire Combination Cup, they also lost 1–0 to Pompey, who had thrashed them 6–0 at the same stage the previous season. Southampton played just one additional friendly match during the 1933–34 campaign, beating divisional rivals Fulham 2–1 at home in January.

Southampton used 22 different players during the 1933–34 season and had thirteen different goalscorers. Their top scorer was centre-forward Ted Drake, who scored 22 goals in the Second Division and one in the FA Cup before he left the club to join Arsenal in March. Inside-forward Arthur Holt scored six times in the league, followed by Norman Cole – who took Drake's place in the regular lineup after his transfer – on five league goals in just ten appearances. Ten players were signed by the club during the campaign, with seven released and sold to other clubs. The average attendance at The Dell during the 1933–34 season was 10,008. The highest attendance of the season was 24,797 against Fulham on 26 December 1933. The lowest attendance was 3,396 against Swansea Town on 5 February 1934.

== Background and transfers ==
After the end of the 1932–33 season, Southampton manager George Kay sold several players. In May, amateur forward Bill Charlton joined divisional rivals Fulham, while former Cottagers left-back Arthur Tilford returned to the club after three months at the South Coast side. Frank Osborne also left the Saints after a season playing for the reserve side, retiring from football until returning as a director at Fulham a few years later. Backup goalkeeper Bob Foster joined Third Division North side Wrexham in June, while outside-left Jimmy Harris was sold to Aylesford Paper Mills. The club also signed several new players. In June, versatile forward Fred Tully joined from top-flight side Aston Villa, and in August half-back Johnny McIlwaine returned after a year at Welsh side Llanelli. During the summer, the club also signed winger Norman Catlin from Arsenal, full-back Frank Ward from Preston North End, and inside-forward Ted Withers from Clark's College, all on amateur terms initially.

Shortly after the start of the season, Southampton signed outside-left Ben Burley from First Division side Sheffield United, centre-forward Vivian Gibbins from Third Division South club Bristol Rovers, and wing-half Henry Long from Hampshire League side Ryde Sports. In October, outside-right Fred Dunmore was sold to Blyth Spartans, and the following month inside-right Joe Cummins and amateur goalkeeper Eugene Bernard were signed. The most notable transfer of the season, however, took place late in the campaign when Ted Drake was sold to First Division title challengers Arsenal. Drake had previously rejected an approach from the Gunners, but moved to the club after a second offer in March 1934, breaking Southampton's transfer record with his fee of £6,000. At the time, Drake was the top scorer in the Second Division with 22 goals; in the ten games he played for Arsenal before the end of the season, he scored seven league goals to help them win the championship.

Players transferred in

Name	Nationality	Pos.	Club	Date	Fee	Ref.
Norman Catlin	England	FW	(England) Arsenal	June 1933	Free (Note: Norman Catlin initially joined on amateur terms in June 1933, before turning professional in January 1935.)	
Fred Tully	England	FW	(England) Aston Villa	June 1933	Unknown	
Frank Ward	England	FB	(England) Preston North End	July 1933	Unknown	
Johnny McIlwaine	Scotland	HB	(Wales) Llanelli	August 1933	Free (Note: Johnny McIlwaine returned to Southampton in August 1933 after a temporary transfer to Llanelli.)	
Ted Withers	England	FW	(England) Clark's College	August 1933	Free (Note: Ted Withers initially joined on amateur terms in August 1933, before turning professional in October 1934.)	
Ben Burley	England	FW	(England) Sheffield United	September 1933	Unknown	
Vivian Gibbins	England	FW	(England) Bristol Rovers	September 1933	Unknown	
Henry Long	England	HB	(England) Ryde Sports	September 1933	Free (Note: Henry Long initially joined on amateur terms in September 1933, before turning professional in October 1934.)	
Eugene Bernard	England	GK	(England) Taunton's School	November 1933	Free (Note: Eugene Bernard initially joined on amateur terms.)	
Joe Cummins	England	FW	(England) Jersey Wanderers	November 1933	Unknown	

Players transferred out

Name	Nationality	Pos.	Club	Date	Fee	Ref.
Bill Charlton	England	FW	(England) Fulham	May 1933	Free	
Arthur Tilford	England	FB	(England) Fulham	May 1933	Free (Note: Arthur Tilford returned to Fulham in May 1933 after a temporary transfer to Southampton.)	
Bob Foster	England	GK	(Wales) Wrexham	June 1933	Unknown	
Fred Dunmore	England	FW	(England) Blyth Spartans	October 1933	Unknown	
Ted Drake	England	FW	(England) Arsenal	March 1934	£6,000	

Players released

Name	Nationality	Pos.	Date	Subsequent club	Ref.
Jimmy Harris	England	FW	May 1933	(England) Aylesford Paper Mills	

Players retired

Name	Nationality	Pos.	Date	Reason	Ref.
Frank Osborne	England	FW	May 1933	Retired due to age	

== Second Division ==
Southampton started the 1933–34 season strongly, picking up three wins in their first five games to secure a place in the top three of the Second Division league table. Centre-forward Ted Drake quickly established himself as the division's top scorer with eight goals in the opening five games, including a hat-trick on the opening day 4–1 win over Bradford City. The club's poor form away from home continued throughout the season, with only their strong home record keeping them safe from relegation. The Saints quickly slipped into the bottom half of the table, and by the end of 1933 were struggling in 13th place. Drake was sent off in a 3–1 loss at Grimsby Town on 9 December, becoming the first Southampton player to be dismissed in the league since Jerry Mackie on the opening day of the 1929–30 season.

The club failed to win a single game away from home during the 1933–34 league campaign, combining with the last two away fixtures of the previous season and the first ten of the next in the club's longest league sequence without an away win (33 matches in total). After top scorer Ted Drake was sold to First Division side Arsenal for a new Southampton club record fee of £6,000 in March 1934, the Saints continued to struggle in the bottom six places of the table, dropping as low as 17th after a run of seven games with just one win. Three more home wins in April – against Blackpool, West Ham United and Grimsby Town – ensured that the club survived relegation to the Third Division South; Southampton finished 14th in the league table with 15 wins (all at home, equalling the club record), eight draws and 19 losses.

=== List of match results ===
26 August 1933 1	Southampton	4–1	Bradford City	Southampton
	Drake; Brewis			Stadium: The Dell; Attendance: 10,474

28 August 1933 2	Oldham Athletic	1–1	Southampton	Oldham
			Drake	Stadium: Boundary Park; Attendance: 7,000

2 September 1933 3	Port Vale	2–1	Southampton	Hanley
			Drake	Stadium: Old Recreation Ground; Attendance: 10,000

4 September 1933 4	Southampton	1–0	Oldham Athletic	Southampton
	Drake			Stadium: The Dell; Attendance: 8,280

9 September 1933 5	Southampton	3–2	Notts County	Southampton
	Drake; Ruddy			Stadium: The Dell; Attendance: 12,237

16 September 1933 6	Swansea Town	1–0	Southampton	Swansea
				Stadium: Vetch Field; Attendance: 10,000

23 September 1933 7	Southampton	2–3	Millwall	Southampton
	Neal			Stadium: The Dell; Attendance: 8,314

30 September 1933 8	Lincoln City	1–1	Southampton	Lincoln
			Drake	Stadium: Sincil Bank; Attendance: 9,000

7 October 1933 9	Southampton	1–0	Bury	Southampton
	Campbell			Stadium: The Dell; Attendance: 11,961

14 October 1933 10	Hull City	1–0	Southampton	Kingston upon Hull
				Stadium: Anlaby Road; Attendance: 12,000

21 October 1933 11	Southampton	2–1	Burnley	Southampton
	Drake			Stadium: The Dell; Attendance: 10,160

28 October 1933 12	Brentford	2–0	Southampton	Brentford
				Stadium: Griffin Park; Attendance: 16,000

4 November 1933 13	Southampton	1–0	Bolton Wanderers	Southampton
	Drake			Stadium: The Dell; Attendance: 15,084

11 November 1933 14	Manchester United	1–0	Southampton	Manchester
				Stadium: Old Trafford; Attendance: 15,000

18 November 1933 15	Southampton	0–1	Plymouth Argyle	Southampton
				Stadium: The Dell; Attendance: 12,333

25 November 1933 16	West Ham United	0–0	Southampton	London
				Stadium: Boleyn Ground; Attendance: 23,000

2 December 1933 17	Southampton	2–0	Nottingham Forest	Southampton
	Holt; Luckett			Stadium: The Dell; Attendance: 8,247

9 December 1933 18	Grimsby Town	3–1	Southampton	Cleethorpes
			Bradford	Stadium: Blundell Park; Attendance: 12,000

16 December 1933 19	Southampton	5–0	Bradford Park Avenue	Southampton
	Sillett; Drake; Holt			Stadium: The Dell; Attendance: 8,482

23 December 1933 20	Preston North End	3–1	Southampton	Preston
			Drake	Stadium: Deepdale; Attendance: 7,000

25 December 1933 21	Fulham	1–0	Southampton	London
				Stadium: Craven Cottage; Attendance: 21,788

26 December 1933 22	Southampton	2–0	Fulham	Southampton
	Drake			Stadium: The Dell; Attendance: 24,797

30 December 1933 23	Bradford City	2–2	Southampton	Bradford
			Campbell; Holt	Stadium: Valley Parade; Attendance: 10,000

6 January 1934 24	Southampton	1–4	Port Vale	Southampton
	Campbell			Stadium: The Dell; Attendance: 9,800

20 January 1934 25	Notts County	2–2	Southampton	Nottingham
			Neal; Drake	Stadium: Meadow Lane; Attendance: 8,000

5 February 1934 26	Southampton	1–0	Swansea Town	Southampton
	Holt			Stadium: The Dell; Attendance: 3,396

10 February 1934 27	Southampton	3–1	Lincoln City	Southampton
	Drake; Tully			Stadium: The Dell; Attendance: 8,044

17 February 1934 28	Bury	1–0	Southampton	Bury
				Stadium: Gigg Lane; Attendance: 9,263

24 February 1934 29	Southampton	1–1	Hull City	Southampton
	Drake			Stadium: The Dell; Attendance: 8,000

3 March 1934 30	Burnley	2–1	Southampton	Burnley
			Drake	Stadium: Turf Moor; Attendance: 7,000

10 March 1934 31	Southampton	0–0	Brentford	Southampton
				Stadium: The Dell; Attendance: 10,439

17 March 1934 32	Bolton Wanderers	2–0	Southampton	Bolton
				Stadium: Burnden Park; Attendance: 10,000

24 March 1934 33	Southampton	1–0	Manchester United	Southampton
	Cole			Stadium: The Dell; Attendance: 4,900

30 March 1934 34	Blackpool	4–2	Southampton	Blackpool
			Holt; Tully	Stadium: Bloomfield Road; Attendance: 20,966

31 March 1934 35	Plymouth Argyle	0–0	Southampton	Plymouth
				Stadium: Home Park; Attendance: 10,000

2 April 1934 36	Southampton	3–2	Blackpool	Southampton
	Adams; Brewis; Cole			Stadium: The Dell; Attendance: 10,221

7 April 1934 37	Southampton	3–2	West Ham United	Southampton
	Cole			Stadium: The Dell; Attendance: 7,000

9 April 1934 38	Millwall	1–0	Southampton	London
				Stadium: The Den; Attendance: 8,000

14 April 1934 39	Nottingham Forest	4–1	Southampton	West Bridgford
			Tully	Stadium: City Ground; Attendance: 8,000

21 April 1934 40	Southampton	4–2	Grimsby Town	Southampton
	Adams; Brewis; McIlwaine; Holt			Stadium: The Dell; Attendance: 9,000

28 April 1934 41	Bradford Park Avenue	3–1	Southampton	Bradford
			Tully	Stadium: Park Avenue; Attendance: 6,000

5 May 1934 42	Southampton	0–1	Preston North End	Southampton
				Stadium: The Dell; Attendance: 9,000

=== Final league table ===
Pos	Team	Pld	W	D	L	GF	GA	GAv	Pts
12	Bury	42	17	9	16	70	73	0.959	43
13	Burnley	42	18	6	18	60	72	0.833	42
14	Southampton	42	15	8	19	54	58	0.931	38
15	Hull City	42	13	12	17	52	68	0.765	38
16	Fulham	42	15	7	20	48	67	0.716	37

Rules for classification: 1) Points; 2) Goal average; 3) Goals scored

=== Results by matchday ===
Round	1	2	3	4	5	6	7	8	9	10	11	12	13	14	15	16	17	18	19	20	21	22	23	24	25	26	27	28	29	30	31	32	33	34	35	36	37	38	39	40	41	42
Ground	H	A	A	H	H	A	H	A	H	A	H	A	H	A	H	A	H	A	H	A	A	H	A	H	A	H	H	A	H	A	H	A	H	A	A	H	H	A	A	H	A	H
Result	W	D	L	W	W	L	L	D	W	L	W	L	W	L	L	D	W	L	W	L	L	W	D	L	D	W	W	L	D	L	D	L	W	L	D	W	W	L	L	W	L	L
Position	2	4	9	5	3	8	10	10	8	12	9	11	8	11	15	13	11	13	10	13	15	14	13	15	16	12	12	13	14	16	16	17	16	17	16	16	16	16	16	14	14	14

Source: 11v11.com
A = Away; H = Home; W = Win; D = Draw; L = Loss

== FA Cup ==
Southampton were drawn in the third round of the 1933–34 FA Cup against Third Division South side Northampton Town at The Dell. The Cobblers opened the scoring after 25 minutes and held onto their lead until half-time, before Ted Drake equalised four minutes after the break to force a replay at the County Ground four days later. Northampton, described by Southampton club historians as "much the better team on the day", defeated the visiting Saints by a single goal, eliminating them in the third round for the sixth season in a row, extending the club's worst run in the tournament.

13 January 1934 Round 3	Southampton	1–1	Northampton Town	Southampton
	Drake 49'		25'	Stadium: The Dell; Attendance: 21,847

17 January 1934 Round 3 Replay	Northampton Town	1–0	Southampton	Northampton
				Stadium: County Ground; Attendance: 16,161

== Other matches ==
Outside of the league and the FA Cup, Southampton played three additional first-team matches during the 1933–34 season. The first was the semi-final of the third annual Hampshire Combination Cup against local rivals Portsmouth on 22 November at Fratton Park. The First Division hosts eliminated the visiting Saints for a second season, with John Wallbanks scoring the only goal after 20 minutes. The club's only friendly match of the season took place on 27 January 1934, with Southampton beating divisional rivals Fulham 2–1 thanks to goals from Ted Drake and Arthur Holt. At the end of the season, Southampton and Portsmouth met again for the combined Hampshire Benevolent Cup and Rowland Hospital Cup. Pompey, having just finished as runners-up in the FA Cup, beat the Second Division hosts 4–1 thanks to goals from Septimus Rutherford, Jack Weddle, Jack Smith and Fred Worrall. Fred Tully scored the only goal for Southampton, "scarcely a minute" after Rutherford's opener.

22 November 1933 Hampshire CC; Semi-Final	Portsmouth	1–0	Southampton	Portsmouth
	Wallbanks 20'			Stadium: Fratton Park; Attendance: 2,215; Referee: G. H. Allen

27 January 1934 Friendly	Southampton	2–1	Fulham	Southampton
	Drake; Holt			Stadium: The Dell

7 May 1934 Hampshire BC/Rowland HC	Southampton	1–4	Portsmouth	Southampton
	Tully		Rutherford 15'; Weddle; Smith; Worrall	Stadium: The Dell; Referee: W. B. Rainey

== Player details ==
Southampton used 22 different players during the 1933–34 season, thirteen of whom scored during the campaign. The team played in a 2–3–5 formation throughout, using two full-backs, three half-backs, two outside forwards, two inside forwards and a centre-forward. Outside-right Dick Neal appeared in all but one of the club's league games during the campaign, while Arthur Roberts, Bill Adams and Stan Woodhouse all played in 39 of the 42 games in the Second Division. Centre-forward Ted Drake finished as the season's top scorer with 20 goals in the Second Division, followed by inside-forward Arthur Holt on six goals, then Norman Cole and Fred Tully on five each. Frank Campbell was the highest-scoring half-back of the season, with three goals during the league campaign.

=== Squad statistics ===
Name	Pos.	Nat.	League		FA Cup		Other (Note: "Other" includes the Hampshire Combination Cup and Hampshire Benevolent/Rowland Hospital Cup matches.)		Total	
Name	Pos.	Nat.	Apps.	Gls.	Apps.	Gls.	Apps.	Gls.	Apps.	Gls.
Bill Adams	HB	(England)	39	2	2	0	1	0	42	2
Arthur Bradford	HB	(England)	30	1	2	0	2	0	34	1
Tom Brewis	FW	(England)	32	3	0	0	2	0	34	3
Ben Burley	FW	(England)	2	0	0	0	0	0	2	0
Frank Campbell	HB	(Scotland)	32	3	2	0	1	0	35	3
Herbert Coates	FW	(England)	4	0	0	0	0	0	4	0
Norman Cole	FW	(England)	10	5	0	0	1	0	11	5
Joe Cummins	FW	(England)	1	0	0	0	0	0	1	0
Vivian Gibbins	FW	(England)	2	0	0	0	0	0	2	0
Arthur Holt	FW	(England)	32	6	2	0	1	0	35	6
Billy Light	GK	(England)	4	0	0	0	0	0	4	0
Bill Luckett	HB	(England)	29	1	1	0	2	0	32	1
Johnny McIlwaine	HB	(Scotland)	11	1	0	0	0	0	11	1
Dick Neal	FW	(England)	41	3	2	0	2	0	45	3
Arthur Roberts	FB	(England)	39	0	2	0	2	0	43	0
Tom Ruddy	FW	(England)	9	1	1	0	1	0	11	1
Bert Scriven	GK	(England)	38	0	2	0	2	0	42	0
Charlie Sillett	FB	(England)	5	2	1	0	1	0	7	2
Fred Tully	FW	(England)	26	4	1	0	2	1	29	5
Frank Ward	FB	(England)	10	0	0	0	1	0	11	0
Stan Woodhouse	HB	(England)	39	0	2	0	1	0	42	0
Players with appearances who left before the end of the season
Ted Drake	FW	(England)	27	22	2	1	0	0	29	23

=== Most appearances ===
Rank	Name	Pos.	League		FA Cup		Other		Total	
Rank	Name	Pos.	Apps.	%	Apps.	%	Apps.	%	Apps.	%
1	Dick Neal	FW	41	97.62	2	100.00	2	100.00	45	97.83
2	Arthur Roberts	FB	39	92.86	2	100.00	2	100.00	43	93.48
3	Bill Adams	HB	39	92.86	2	100.00	1	50.00	42	91.30
3	Stan Woodhouse	HB	39	92.86	2	100.00	1	50.00	42	91.30
3	Bert Scriven	GK	38	90.48	2	100.00	2	100.00	42	91.30
6	Frank Campbell	HB	32	76.20	2	100.00	1	50.00	35	76.09
6	Arthur Holt	FW	32	76.20	2	100.00	1	50.00	35	76.09
8	Tom Brewis	FW	32	76.19	0	0.00	2	100.00	34	73.91
8	Arthur Bradford	HB	30	71.43	2	100.00	2	100.00	34	73.91
10	Bill Luckett	HB	29	69.05	1	50.00	2	100.00	32	69.57

=== Top goalscorers ===
Rank	Name	Pos.	League		FA Cup		Other		Total	
Rank	Name	Pos.	Gls.	GPG	Gls.	GPG	Gls.	GPG	Gls.	GPG
1	Ted Drake	FW	22	0.81	1	0.50	0	0.00	23	0.79
2	Arthur Holt	FW	6	0.18	0	0.00	0	0.00	6	0.17
3	Norman Cole	FW	5	0.50	0	0.00	0	0.00	5	0.45
3	Fred Tully	FW	4	0.15	0	0.00	1	0.50	5	0.17
5	Tom Brewis	FW	3	0.09	0	0.00	2	0.00	3	0.08
5	Frank Campbell	HB	3	0.09	0	0.00	2	0.00	3	0.08
5	Dick Neal	FW	3	0.07	0	0.00	2	0.00	3	0.06
8	Charlie Sillett	FW	2	0.40	0	0.00	2	0.00	2	0.28
8	Bill Adams	HB	2	0.05	0	0.00	2	0.00	2	0.04
10	Johnny McIlwaine	HB	1	0.11	0	0.00	2	0.00	1	0.11
10	Tom Ruddy	FW	1	0.11	0	0.00	2	0.00	1	0.11
10	Bill Luckett	HB	1	0.03	0	0.00	2	0.00	1	0.03
10	Arthur Bradford	HB	1	0.03	0	0.00	2	0.00	1	0.02

== Bibliography ==
- Chalk, Gary; Holley, Duncan (10 August 1987), A Complete Record of Southampton Football Club: 1885–1987, Derby, England: Breedon Books, ISBN 978-0907969228
- Chalk, Gary; Holley, Duncan; Bull, David (28 November 2013), All the Saints: A Complete Who's Who of Southampton FC, Bristol, England: Hagiology Publishing, ISBN 978-0992686406
- Juson, Dave; Aldworth, Clay; Bendel, Barry; Bull, David; Chalk, Gary (10 November 2004), Saints v Pompey: A History of Unrelenting Rivalry, Bristol, England: Hagiology Publishing, ISBN 978-0953447459
