= SS Corvus =

Corvus was the name of several steamships

- SS Corvus (1919), a World War I era United States cargo ship transferred to the USSR and wrecked in 1945
- SS Corvus (1920), a Norwegian cargo ship torpedoed and sunk by U-1018 on 27 February 1945

== See also ==
- USS Corvus, a U.S. Navy attack cargo ship in service from 1944 to 1946
