= Doug Rowe =

Doug Rowe may refer to:

- Doug Rowe (footballer) (1909–1978), English footballer
- Doug Rowe (rugby union) (born 1976), American rugby union player
