= Bob Foster (footballer) =

English footballer (1911–1983)

Personal information
- Full name: Robert Foster
- Date of birth: 7 April 1911
- Place of birth: Deane, England
- Date of death: c. October 1983 (aged 72)
- Place of death: Manchester, England
- Height: 5 ft 10 in (1.78 m)
- Position: Goalkeeper

Youth career
- Farnworth Standard
- 1930–1931: Burnley

Senior career*
Years	Team	Apps	(Gls)
1931–1932	Accrington Stanley	11	(0)
1932–1933	Southampton	1	(0)
1933–1935	Wrexham	29	(0)
1935–1936	Bury	0	(0)
1936–1937	Oldham Athletic	11	(0)
1937–1940	Mossley	93	(0)
- * Club domestic league appearances and goals

Robert Foster (7 April 1911 – c. October 1983) was an English professional footballer who played as a goalkeeper for several clubs in the 1930s.

== Career ==
Foster was born in the Deane district of Bolton on 7 April 1911. He started his football career with local side Farnworth Standard before joining Accrington Stanley in the Football League Third Division North.

After one season, he joined Southampton of the Second Division, where he was signed as cover for Bert Scriven. In his year at The Dell, he made 36 appearances for the reserves, but only managed one appearance in the first team, in a 2–2 draw against Port Vale on 29 August 1932.

In the summer of 1933, Foster moved on to Wrexham and then to Bury. By the summer of 1936, his football career seemed to be over, never having made a first-team appearance for Bury, and he was running a newsagency. In September 1936, he was signed by Oldham Athletic of the Third Division North for whom he made 11 first-team appearances, finishing on the losing side just once.

He finished his career at Mossley of the Cheshire County League, for whom he made a total of 93 appearances.
