= Alf Wheeler (footballer, born 1910) =

English footballer

Personal information
- Full name: Alfred James Wheeler
- Date of birth: 4 April 1910
- Place of birth: Bilston, England
- Date of death: 1978 (aged 67–68)
- Place of death: Wolverhampton, England
- Positions: Inside forward; centre forward

Youth career
- Thompson Brothers
- 1929–1931: Wolverhampton Wanderers

Senior career*
Years	Team	Apps	(Gls)
1931–1932	Walsall	11	(3)
1932	Mossley	1	(0)
1932–1933	Brentford	1	(0)
1933–1934	Northampton Town	5	(1)
1934–1935	Southampton	11	(6)
1935	Barnsley	0	(0)
1935–1936	Norwich City	0	(0)
1936–1937	Gillingham	8	(3)
1937	Dudley		
- * Club domestic league appearances and goals

Alfred James Wheeler (4 April 1910 – 1978) was an English professional footballer who played as a forward for various clubs in the Football League in the 1930s.

== Football career ==
Wheeler was born in Bilston, near Wolverhampton and started his professional career with Walsall in the Football League Third Division North, for whom he scored three goals in eleven league appearances. After a spell in the Cheshire County League with Mossley, Wheeler joined Brentford, before joining Northampton Town for the 1933–34 season, in which he made five appearances, scoring once.

In July 1934, he joined Southampton of the Second Division, making his debut playing at inside-left at home to Port Vale on 27 August. He was in and out of the side for most of the season, with Arthur Holt the preferred inside-left. In November 1934, Wheeler played three matches at centre-forward in place of Norman Cole, scoring an "outstanding" hat-trick in the first 27 minutes of a 4–1 victory over Bradford City. A lack of consistency led to him being dropped in favour of new signing, Walter Pollard, and Wheeler was transfer listed at the end of the season.

In August 1935, he joined Barnsley for a fee of £100, and in October he moved on to Norwich City, but he never played first-team football for either club. In the summer of 1936, he joined his final league club, Gillingham, making a further eight league appearances, scoring three goals.
