= German submarine U-1018 =

German World War II submarine

History

Nazi Germany
- Name: U-1018
- Ordered: 23 March 1942
- Builder: Blohm & Voss, Hamburg
- Yard number: 218
- Laid down: 16 April 1943
- Launched: 1 March 1944
- Commissioned: 24 April 1944
- Fate: Sunk on 27 February 1945

General characteristics
- Class & type: Type VIIC/41 submarine
- Displacement: 759 tonnes (747 long tons) surfaced; 860 t (846 long tons) submerged
- Length: 67.10 m (220 ft 2 in) o/a; 50.50 m (165 ft 8 in) pressure hull
- Beam: 6.20 m (20 ft 4 in) o/a; 4.70 m (15 ft 5 in) pressure hull
- Height: 9.60 m (31 ft 6 in)
- Draught: 4.74 m (15 ft 7 in)
- Installed power: 2,800–3,200 PS (2,100–2,400 kW; 2,800–3,200 bhp) (diesels); 750 PS (550 kW; 740 shp) (electric)
- Propulsion: 2 shafts; 2 × diesel engines; 2 × electric motors
- Speed: 17.7 knots (32.8 km/h; 20.4 mph) surfaced; 7.6 knots (14.1 km/h; 8.7 mph) submerged
- Range: 8,500 nmi (15,700 km; 9,800 mi) at 10 knots (19 km/h; 12 mph) surfaced; 80 nmi (150 km; 92 mi) at 4 knots (7.4 km/h; 4.6 mph) submerged
- Test depth: 230 m (750 ft); Calculated crush depth: 250–295 m (820–968 ft)
- Complement: 44-52 officers & ratings
- Armament: 5 × 53.3 cm (21 in) torpedo tubes (4 bow, 1 stern); 14 × torpedoes; 1 × 8.8 cm (3.46 in) deck gun (220 rounds); 1 × 3.7 cm (1.5 in) Flak M42 AA gun; 2 × 2 cm (0.79 in) C/30 AA guns

Service record
- Part of: 31st U-boat Flotilla; 24 April – 30 November 1944; 11th U-boat Flotilla; 1 December 1944 – 27 February 1945
- Identification codes: M 22 623
- Commanders: Kptlt. Ulrich Faber; 24 April – 1 June 1944; Kptlt. Walter Burmeister; 2 June 1944 – 27 February 1945
- Operations: 1 patrol: 21 January – 27 February 1945
- Victories: 1 merchant ship sunk (1,317 GRT)

German submarine U-1018 was a German Type VIIC/41 U-boat, built during World War II for service in the Battle of the Atlantic. The U-boat was fitted with the Schnorchel underwater-breathing apparatus which enabled her to stay under-water for extended periods thus avoiding detection by enemy warships.

== Design ==
German Type VIIC/41 submarines were preceded by the heavier Type VIIC submarines. U-1018 had a displacement of 759 tonnes (747 long tons) when at the surface and 860 tonnes (850 long tons) while submerged. She had a total length of 67.10 m (220 ft 2 in), a pressure hull length of 50.50 m (165 ft 8 in), a beam of 6.20 m (20 ft 4 in), a height of 9.60 m (31 ft 6 in), and a draught of 4.74 m (15 ft 7 in). The submarine was powered by two Germaniawerft F46 four-stroke, six-cylinder supercharged diesel engines producing a total of 2,800 to 3,200 metric horsepower (2,060 to 2,350 kW; 2,760 to 3,160 shp) for use while surfaced, two Brown, Boveri & Cie GG UB 720/8 double-acting electric motors producing a total of 750 metric horsepower (550 kW; 740 shp) for use while submerged. She had two shafts and two 1.23 m (4 ft) propellers. The boat was capable of operating at depths of up to 230 metres (750 ft).

The submarine had a maximum surface speed of 17.7 knots (32.8 km/h; 20.4 mph) and a maximum submerged speed of 7.6 knots (14.1 km/h; 8.7 mph). When submerged, the boat could operate for 80 nautical miles (150 km; 92 mi) at 4 knots (7.4 km/h; 4.6 mph); when surfaced, she could travel 8,500 nautical miles (15,700 km; 9,800 mi) at 10 knots (19 km/h; 12 mph). U-1018 was fitted with five 53.3 cm (21 in) torpedo tubes (four fitted at the bow and one at the stern), fourteen torpedoes, one 8.8 cm (3.46 in) SK C/35 naval gun, (220 rounds), one 3.7 cm (1.5 in) Flak M42 and two 2 cm (0.79 in) C/30 anti-aircraft guns. The boat had a complement of between forty-four and sixty.

== Service history ==
She was completed in Hamburg in April 1944, and spent the rest of 1944 training with the 31st U-boat Flotilla. An accident took place during U-1018's work-up period in the Baltic on 17 June which killed one crew member (Obersteuermann Walter Nellsen) and wounded two. In December 1944, she was moved from Kiel to Horten Naval Base in Norway to join 11th U-boat Flotilla, before departing on 21 January 1945 to patrol the Western Approaches of the English Channel under the command of Kapitänleutnant Walter Burmeister.

== Combat role ==
On 27 February 1945 she attacked convoy BTC 81 about seven miles from Lizard Point, Cornwall (at 49°55′N 05°22′W). U-1018 launched a torpedo which hit the Norwegian freighter Corvus which sank within a few minutes, resulting in the death of five of the freighter's Norwegian crew, a 16-year-old British cabin boy, Thomas Boniface, and two British Royal Navy gunners, (part of the DEMS gun crew) including former professional footballer Charlie Sillett.

The convoy escort ships immediately launched heavy counter-attacks. Less than two hours later, U-1018 was sunk by depth charges dropped by HMS Loch Fada under the command of Cdr. Benjamin Andrew Rogers, RD, RNR. Only two members of the crew of 53 survived.

== Summary of raiding history ==
Date	Ship Name	Nationality	Tonnage (GRT)	Fate
27 February 1945	Corvus	Norway	1,317	Sunk

== See also ==
- Battle of the Atlantic (1939-1945)

== Bibliography ==
- Busch, Rainer; Röll, Hans-Joachim (1999). German U-boat commanders of World War II : a biographical dictionary. Translated by Brooks, Geoffrey. London, Annapolis, Md: Greenhill Books, Naval Institute Press. ISBN 1-55750-186-6.
- Busch, Rainer; Röll, Hans-Joachim (1999). Deutsche U-Boot-Verluste von September 1939 bis Mai 1945 [German U-boat losses from September 1939 to May 1945]. Der U-Boot-Krieg (in German). Vol. IV. Hamburg, Berlin, Bonn: Mittler. ISBN 3-8132-0514-2.
- Gröner, Erich; Jung, Dieter; Maass, Martin (1991). German Warships 1815–1945, U-boats and Mine Warfare Vessels. Vol. 2. Translated by Thomas, Keith; Magowan, Rachel. London: Conway Maritime Press. ISBN 0-85177-593-4.
