= Donovan Browning =

English footballer

Personal information
- Full name: Donovan Albert Browning
- Date of birth: 9 May 1916
- Place of birth: Ashley, Hampshire, England
- Date of death: 1997 (aged 80–81)
- Place of death: Dorset, England
- Height: 5 ft 9 in (1.75 m)
- Position: Right-back

Youth career
- New Milton

Senior career*
Years	Team	Apps	(Gls)
1935–1939	Southampton	26	(0)
- * Club domestic league appearances and goals

Donovan Albert Browning (9 May 1916 – 1997) was an English professional footballer who played at right-back in the Football League for Southampton in the 1930s.

== Football career ==
Browning was born into a farming family at Ashley, near New Milton and represented New Forest Schools before joining New Milton of the Hampshire League in 1934.

In May 1935, Browning moved across the New Forest to join Southampton of the Football League Second Division. He spent his first year at The Dell in the reserves and his first-team debut came on 28 December 1936, when he replaced Charlie Sillett at right-back, with Sillett moving to the left in the absence of Arthur Roberts for the match against Coventry City, which ended in a 1–1 draw. Although Browning lost his place for the next match, he was recalled in February and played most of the remaining matches until the end of the season.

He started the next season as first-choice right-back before a serious knee injury in early October put him out of the game for several months. On his return in February, he had lost his consistency and only played another four matches before being transfer-listed for a fee of £500 in May 1938. No other club came in for him, so he remained at The Dell for another year, making only six reserve-team appearances before he was released in May 1939.

== Later career ==
Browning was also a talented cricketer and was on the ground-staff at Hampshire County Cricket Club's County Ground.

He later became a farmer in Dorset with 5,000 acres and was still a season ticket holder at the Dell in 1992.
