= Lionel Bowen (footballer) =

English footballer

Personal information
- Full name: Lionel Francis William Bowen
- Date of birth: 31 December 1915
- Place of birth: Southampton, England
- Date of death: July 1996 (age 80)
- Place of death: Marlborough, England
- Height: 5 ft 10 in (1.78 m)
- Position: Left-back

Youth career
- Crystal Palace

Senior career*
Years	Team	Apps	(Gls)
1934–1937	Southampton	2	(0)
- Winchester City
- * Club domestic league appearances and goals

Lionel Francis William Bowen QPM (31 December 1915 – July 1996) was an English professional footballer who played at left-back for Southampton in 1937, before a long career in the police.

== Football career ==
Bowen was born in Sholing, Southampton and educated at Sholing School. After playing for the school and Sholing St. Mary's, he spent a short spell as a trainee at Crystal Palace before returning to his home-town club in September 1934.

He spent the first two seasons with the "Saints" in the reserves, making over 90 appearances, before replacing Donovan Browning for the last two matches of the 1936–37 season, away to Barnsley (lost 2–1) and at home to Nottingham Forest (lost 3–0).

== Police career ==
During the summer of 1937, Bowen obtained a place at the Metropolitan Police training college at Hendon. He later joined the Hampshire Constabulary, reaching the rank of Chief Superintendent, and was awarded the Queen's Police Medal in the 1977 New Year's Honours.

During World War II, Bowen was on duty in Southampton when he came upon a group of drunken revellers; amongst the men he admonished was a former Saints teammate, Billy Boyd.
