= Doug Rowe (footballer) =

English footballer

Personal information
- Full name: Douglas Heath Rowe
- Date of birth: 9 July 1909
- Place of birth: Nottingham, England
- Date of death: 6 May 1978 (aged 68)
- Place of death: Grimsby, England
- Height: 5 ft 9 in (1.75 m)
- Position: Outside left

Youth career
- Sneinton

Senior career*
Years	Team	Apps	(Gls)
1932–1933	Luton Town	23	(8)
1933–1934	Lincoln City	11	(5)
1934	Southampton	2	(1)
1934–1935	US Tourcoing		
- * Club domestic league appearances and goals

Douglas Heath Rowe (6 July 1909 – 6 May 1978) was an English professional footballer who played as an outside forward for Luton Town, Lincoln City and Southampton in the 1930s.

== Football career ==
Rowe was born in Nottingham and played his early football with the local Sneinton village side before joining Luton Town in March 1932. After a season with Luton in the Football League Third Division South, in which he made 23 appearances with eight goals, Rowe moved to Lincoln City of the Second Division.

After a year with the "Imps", when he was used as understudy to Jack Wilkinson, Rowe had made eleven appearances at outside left scoring five goals.

In August 1934, he moved to the south coast to join Southampton. He played in two of the first three matches of the season, scoring in his second match, a 2–2 draw with Oldham Athletic, before he lost his place to Laurie Fishlock. Before long, Rowe requested a transfer and he moved to France to join US Tourcoing.

His time in France was brief, and by the following summer he had returned to England.

== Family and career outside football ==
His brother, Bernard was a wrestler, who competed in the 1924 and 1928 Summer Olympics and won a silver medal at the 1934 Empire Games.

Doug himself was a top-class wrestler, winning the England Amateur Welterweight Championship, and also won prizes as a weight-lifter.
