= Jack Gurry =

English footballer

Personal information
- Full name: John William Gurry
- Date of birth: 17 July 1907
- Place of birth: Barking, England
- Date of death: 1 October 1983 (aged 76)
- Place of death: Leicester, England
- Height: 5 ft 9 in (1.75 m)
- Positions: Half back; inside forward

Senior career*
Years	Team	Apps	(Gls)
1929–1930	West Ham United	0	(0)
1930	Barking		
1930–1935	Leicester City	23	(0)
1935–1936	Southampton	9	(0)
1936–1937	Chester	6	(3)
- * Club domestic league appearances and goals

John William Gurry (17 July 1907 – 1 October 1983) was an English professional footballer who played as either a half back or inside forward for various clubs in the 1920s and 1930s.

== Football career ==
Gurry was born in Barking, Essex and started his football career when he joined West Ham United as an amateur in December 1929, as well as playing for Barking in the Athenian League.

In 1930, his employment in the hosiery trade took him to Leicester where he was offered a professional contract by Leicester City of the First Division. Gurry spent most of his career at Filbert Street in the reserves; a broken leg in a reserve match delayed his breakthrough into the first team, which eventually came in a 1–1 draw at Leeds United on 12 November 1932. He retained his place in the side until February and again at the start of the 1933–34 season, but was then in and out of the side, being used as cover. Although he failed to score for the first team, he was a regular scorer in the reserves, where he netted 15 times in one season.

In July 1935, he moved to the south coast to join Second Division Southampton. In his one season at The Dell, Gurry made 31 appearances for the reserves and nine for the first team, in four different positions, either as a half back or in the forward line.

In the summer of 1936, he was placed on the transfer list for a fee of £250, but eventually joined Chester (of the Third Division North) on a free transfer. He made six league appearances with his only league goals all coming in one match, when he scored a hat-trick in a 7–3 victory against Lincoln City on 14 November 1936.

== Later career ==
He retired from football in 1937 and returned to Leicester, where he once again found employment in the hosiery trade.
