= Doug Henderson (footballer) =

English professional footballer (1913–2002)

Personal information
- Full name: Douglas Henderson
- Date of birth: 6 March 1913
- Place of birth: Southampton, England
- Date of death: 2002 (aged 88–89)
- Height: 5 ft 9 in (1.75 m)
- Positions: Half-back; right-back

Youth career
- Park Avenue

Senior career*
Years	Team	Apps	(Gls)
1934–1939	Southampton	22	(0)
1939–1940	Bristol City	0	(0)
- * Club domestic league appearances and goals

Douglas Henderson (6 March 1913 – 2002) was an English professional footballer who played as a half-back or right-back for Southampton in the 1930s.

== Football career ==
Henderson was born in Southampton and was educated at St Denys School. He played youth football for Park Avenue and was spotted playing in a match on Southampton Common by Southampton's trainer, Bert Shelley.

He joined Southampton as an amateur in September 1934, and signed professional papers shortly afterwards, making his first-team debut at right-back away to Bury on 1 January 1936. With Bill Adams well-established at right-back, Henderson was never a regular selection, although he did play the last six matches of the 1935–36 season as a half-back as cover for the ageing Arthur Bradford and Stan Woodhouse.

Henderson only made one appearance in the following season, on the final day, but in February 1938 managed a run of nine games taking over from Charlie Sillett at right-back. After a handful of appearances the following year, he was given a free transfer to Bristol City in June 1939, but the outbreak of the Second World War brought his career to a close.

== Later career ==
Following the outbreak of war, Henderson returned to Southampton to become a policeman. He remained in the police force until his retirement.
