= SS Corvus (1920) =

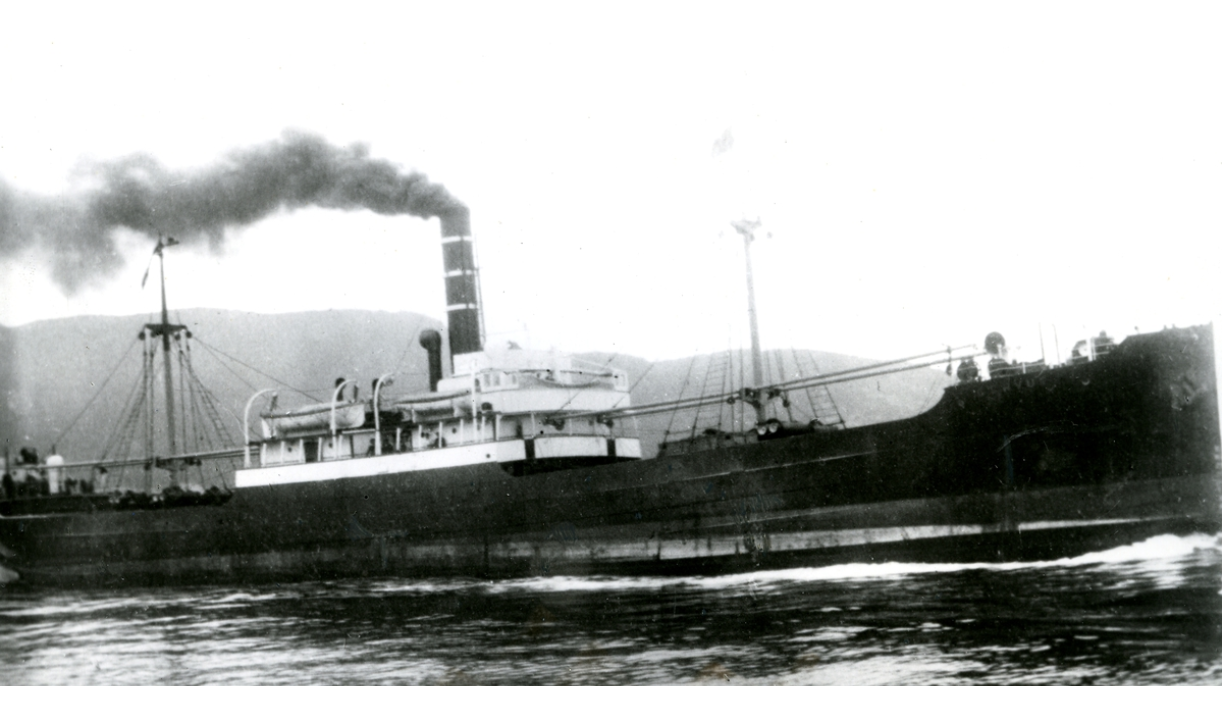

History

Norway
- Name: Corvus
- Namesake: Corvus
- Operator: Det Bergenske Dampskibsselskab
- Port of registry: Bergen
- Ordered: 1916
- Builder: Kjøbenhavns Flydedok & Skibsværft A/S, Copenhagen
- Yard number: 141
- Launched: 23 December 1920
- Completed: January 1921
- Identification: Code Letters LDFH
- Fate: Sunk, 27 February 1945

General characteristics
- Type: Steam merchant ship
- Tonnage: 1,317 GRT; 763 NRT; 2,180 DWT
- Length: 241 ft 4 in (73.56 m)
- Beam: 36 ft 2 in (11.02 m)
- Depth: 16 ft 2 in (4.93 m)
- Propulsion: 525 hp triple expansion steam engine (Kjøbenhavns Flydedok & Skibsværft A/S)
- Speed: 9 knots (17 km/h)
- Crew: 25
- Notes: All the above information, unless otherwise noted, was acquired from

SS Corvus was a 1,317 GRT Norwegian steamship built in Copenhagen in 1920/21 by Kjøbenhavns Flydedok & Skibsværft A/S for the Norwegian passenger ship company Det Bergenske Dampskibsselskab of Bergen, which was attacked and sunk by two German U-boats in the Western Approaches of the English Channel on 27 February 1945.

== World War II ==
She spent the early part of 1940 plying between Norway and the United Kingdom. She joined Convoy HN 25, which left Bergen on 7 April 1940, thus managing to get out of Norway just before the German invasion which was initiated on 9 April. She spent the rest of 1940 in the coastal waters around the UK, with occasional passages across the Atlantic Ocean to Canada. In 1941 she made one voyage to West Africa visiting Lagos and Port Harcourt as well as crossing the Atlantic twice, visiting Halifax, Nova Scotia and New York City. During these voyages she carried various general cargoes, as well as palm kernels from Nigeria and lumber from North America.

During 1942 and early 1943 she sailed in the areas around the British Isles, before a voyage to Gibraltar and North Africa as part of Convoy KMS16 commencing in June. She remained in the Mediterranean until her return to Liverpool in February 1944. After spending four months undergoing repairs, she returned to service around the British Isles in July, continuing until her final voyage.

=== Final voyage ===
On 23 February 1945, Corvus departed Garston near Liverpool bound for Plymouth with a cargo of 1,800 tons of coal, with Alexander Wallace as captain, carrying a crew of 22 plus a DEMS gun crew of three British Royal Navy gunners. She changed convoy at Mumbles, and left Mumbles Head on the morning of 26 February to join Convoy BTC 81 near Scarwater Lightship.

At 10:15 BST on 27 February, the convoy was attacked by two German U-boats, U-327 and U-1018 about seven miles from Lizard Point, Cornwall (at 49°55′N 05°22′W). She was hit by a torpedo launched by U-1018 which ripped her starboard side open, causing her to develop a heavy list and sink within minutes, resulting in the death of four of the freighter's Norwegian crew, the Latvian stoker, a 16-year-old British cabin boy, Thomas Boniface, and two of the Royal Navy gunners, Dennis Baker and former professional footballer Charlie Sillett.

Some of the crew had been able to launch a raft, while others had to jump overboard. Most of the survivors were picked up by the British steam merchant ship Baronscourt, one survivor by the Swedish steam ship Wallonia and landed in Falmouth for medical treatment of four injured survivors.

The convoy escort ships immediately launched heavy counter-attacks. Less than two hours later, both U-1018 and U-327 were sunk by depth charges dropped by HMS Loch Fada under the command of Cdr. Benjamin Andrew Rogers, RD, RNR.
