= Joe Cummins =

English footballer

Personal information
- Full name: Joseph Henry Cummins
- Date of birth: 8 April 1910
- Place of birth: Plympton, England
- Date of death: 1992 (aged 81–82)
- Position: Inside right

Senior career*
Years	Team	Apps	(Gls)
- Jersey Wanderers
1933–1934	Southampton	1	(0)
1934–1935	US Tourcoing		
1935–19??	Newport (IOW)		
- * Club domestic league appearances and goals

Joseph Henry Cummins (8 April 1910 – 1992) was an English professional footballer who made one Football League appearance for Southampton in 1934.

== Football career ==
Cummins was born in Plympton, Devon but started his football career on the Channel Islands with Jersey Wanderers. In November 1933, he was signed by Southampton, of the Football League Second Division as a full back.

He spent most of his time at the Saints playing for the reserves, but on 9 April 1934 (the day after his 24th birthday) he was called into the first team to play at inside right in place of Tom Brewis away to Millwall., Cummins was injured early in the game and had to play as a "passenger" for the remainder of the match, which ended in a 1–0 defeat.

In the summer of 1934, he moved to Roubaix in northern France to play for US Tourcoing, although he soon returned to England.

== Later career ==
He later settled in Hampshire to work for the Ordnance Survey, although he played non-league football on the Isle of Wight for Newport.
