= Harry Foxall =

English footballer (1901–1976)

Personal information
- Full name: Harry Foxall
- Date of birth: 9 November 1901
- Place of birth: Birmingham, England
- Date of death: 1976 (aged 74–75)
- Position: Half-back

Senior career*
Years	Team	Apps	(Gls)
1919	Cradley Heath		
1919–1922	Pontypridd		
1922–1924	Merthyr Town	64	(3)
1924–1928	Portsmouth	155	(10)
1928–1930	Cradley Heath		
1930-1931	Stourbridge	12	(2)
Total		231	(15)
- * Club domestic league appearances and goals

Harry Foxall (9 November 1901 – 1976) was an English footballer who played in the Football League for Merthyr Town and Portsmouth.
