= James Horton (footballer, born 1907) =

English footballer

Personal information
- Full name: James William George Horton
- Date of birth: 6 January 1907
- Place of birth: Aldershot, England
- Date of death: July 1972 (aged 65)
- Place of death: Aldershot, England
- Height: 5 ft 10 in (1.78 m)
- Position: Forward

Youth career
- Royal Engineers
- Wellington Works
- Aldershot & District Traction

Senior career*
Years	Team	Apps	(Gls)
1928	Woking		
1928–1930	Aldershot Town		
1930–1934	Millwall	49	(8)
1934–1935	Southampton	4	(1)
1935	Aldershot	0	(0)
- * Club domestic league appearances and goals

James William George Horton (6 January 1907 – July 1972) was an English professional footballer who played as a forward for Aldershot, Millwall and Southampton in the 1920s and 1930s.

== Football career ==
Horton was born in Aldershot and qualified as an electrician. After playing for various works teams, he started his football career when he joined Woking of the Isthmian League in October 1928. After scoring five goals on his debut and three in his next match, he was soon offered a contract with Aldershot Town of the Southern League, who he joined in November.

At Aldershot, he scored 27 goals in 26 appearances in 1928–29, following this with 31 league goals in only 21 games in the next season, before joining Millwall, of the Football League Second Division for a fee of £1,000 in January 1930.

At Millwall, Horton was in and out of the side over the next four and a half years, managing only 49 league appearances with eight goals before transferring to fellow Second Division club, Southampton, for a £500 fee in September 1934.

At The Dell, Horton was used as cover and made only four first-team appearances, in three different forward positions, in the 1934–35 season. Horton was considered "a bit of a character" and would change into his playing kit, but only remove his bowler hat at the moment of leaving the dressing room.

After a season with the Saints, Horton returned to Aldershot, but a leg injury forced him to retire from professional football without making a Football League appearance for the club.

== Later career ==
After the Second World War, Horton found employment as the groundsman at Aldershot's Recreation Ground stadium.

== Family ==
Horton's son, Billy, played for Aldershot in the 1960s; James' grandson, Jamie, was on the books of Farnborough Town in the 1990s.
