= Charlie Sillett =

English footballer (1906-1945)

Personal information
- Full name: Charles Thomas Sillett
- Date of birth: 29 October 1906
- Place of birth: Plumstead, England
- Date of death: 27 February 1945 (aged 38)
- Place of death: SS Corvus, off Lizard Point, England
- Height: 5 ft 8 in (1.73 m)
- Position: Full back

Youth career
- 1931: Barking Town

Senior career*
Years	Team	Apps	(Gls)
1931–1938	Southampton	175	(9)
1938	Guildford City		
Military career
Allegiance	United Kingdom
Branch	Royal Navy
Service years	1942–1945
Rank	Leading Seaman
Units	HMS Registan; SS Corvus
Conflicts	Second World War: Atlantic War; Atlantic convoys; Convoy BTC 81; Sinking of SS Corvus †
- * Club domestic league appearances and goals

Charles Thomas Sillett (29 October 1906 – 27 February 1945) was an English professional footballer who played as a full back for Southampton in the 1930s. He was the father of John Sillett and Peter Sillett, both of whom became professional footballers.

Charlie Sillett was killed in a U-boat attack on an allied convoy while serving with the Royal Navy in 1945. He had already survived the torpedoing of HMS Registan in 1942.

== Football career ==
=== Army ===
Sillett was born in Plumstead in the Royal Borough of Greenwich, the son of Sidney and Mary Sillett. He joined the Army in 1926 and was enlisted in the 60th King's Royal Rifle Corps, based at Tidworth Camp on Salisbury Plain, where he rose to the rank of Sergeant, becoming a physical training instructor. His skills on the football field won him a variety of Army representative honours.

In 1931, his Army career came to an end, and after a short period playing with Barking Town in the Athenian League he joined Second Division Southampton in October 1931.

=== Southampton ===
He played two matches with Southampton's reserves, before being drafted into the first team as an emergency centre forward, where the "Saints" were suffering with an injury crisis with Bill Fraser, Arthur Haddleton and Johnny McIlwaine all unavailable. Sillett scored twice on his debut, in a 3–1 victory at Burnley on 2 January 1932, and retained his place in the first team, playing up front until Ted Drake was promoted from the reserves in March. Sillett was recalled, this time at left-back, replacing Reg Thomas for the final three matches of the season.

During the following season, manager George Kay settled on a defensive line-up of Bill Adams and Michael Keeping at fullbacks, with Stan Woodhouse, Frank Campbell, Arthur Bradford or Bill Luckett as the three half backs – as a result, Sillett managed only six games all season. In 1933–34, he was again kept out of his favoured role as full back, this time by Arthur Roberts, but had a run of four games taking over from Tommy Brewis at inside right, during which he scored twice in a 5–0 victory over Bradford at The Dell on 16 December.

In August 1934, after three seasons with the Saints, Sillett became an established member of the first team and in 1934–35 he only missed three games, playing at either left- or right-back. He soon became "very popular with fans and colleagues alike" and his versatility meant that he was equally at home on either side of the pitch. In the following season, he was ever-present often playing further forward in midfield and occasionally standing in as centre forward when Vic Watson was unavailable. During this season, he was a member of the team that suffered an 8–0 defeat against Tottenham Hotspur at White Hart Lane on 28 March 1936; two days later, he played at The Dell against Port Vale in front of only 1,875 spectators (losing 1–0). This was the lowest-ever crowd for a first-team match at The Dell.

He only missed one league match in 1936–37 as the Saints struggled to avoid relegation, finishing in 19th place, four points above the relegation zone. In January, the Saints played Football League champions Sunderland in a Third Round FA Cup match in front of a record crowd of 30,380. Sunderland won 3–2 and went on to take the cup in the final the following May.

In his final season at The Dell, Sillett was appointed team captain, "leading the side with distinction", but began to suffer regularly from injuries causing him to miss a third of the season, at the end of which he decided to retire. During his seven years with Southampton, Sillett made a total of 183 appearances in League and Cup matches for the first team, scoring 10 goals. Throughout his entire Southampton career, the club was struggling both financially and on the pitch, regularly finishing in the lower half of the table.

== Later career and death ==
He had a brief career in non-League football with Guildford City, before becoming a publican at "The Lamb" at Nomansland in the New Forest.

During World War II, he enlisted in the Royal Navy, serving as a DEMS gunner. On 29 September 1942, Sillett was serving on HMS Registan with the rank of Able Seaman when it was torpedoed by German submarine U-332 140 miles east of Barbados, with the loss of 11 crew members and 5 DEMS gunners. Sillett survived the sinking and was picked up on 30 September by an Argentinian merchant boat. On 27 February 1945, he was a member of a DEMS gun crew on the Norwegian freighter SS Corvus, which was part of convoy BTC 81, when the convoy was attacked by two German U-boats about seven miles from Lizard Point, Cornwall. Corvus was hit by a torpedo launched by U-1018 and sank within a few minutes, resulting in the death of five of the freighter's Norwegian crew, a 16-year-old British cabin boy, Thomas Boniface, and two of the three British gunners, Leading Seaman Sillett and Able Seaman Dennis Baker. Both U-boats were sunk two hours later with depth charges from HMS Loch Fada.

He is commemorated on the Chatham Naval Memorial.

== Family ==
Sillett was married to Anne and their children included Peter (born in Southampton on 1 February 1933) and John (born in Southampton on 20 July 1936). The two sons were trainees at Southampton after the war, both subsequently joining Chelsea.

Peter played 64 games for Southampton, before moving to Chelsea in 1953, where he had a long career playing 260 league matches and going on to make three appearances for England in 1955. He was also a (non-playing) member of England's squad for the 1958 FIFA World Cup.

John never appeared in Southampton's first team, but joined his brother at Chelsea in 1954, making 93 appearances in the league. He subsequently played for Coventry City and Plymouth Argyle, before becoming a manager at Hereford United and then at Coventry City, where he won the 1987 FA Cup final.

== See also ==
- List of footballers killed during World War II
