= Vic Watson =

English footballer

Personal information
- Full name: Victor Martin Watson
- Date of birth: 10 November 1897
- Place of birth: Girton, England
- Date of death: 3 August 1988 (aged 90)
- Place of death: Girton, England
- Height: 5 ft 10 in (1.78 m)
- Position: Centre forward

Senior career*
Years	Team	Apps	(Gls)
1912–1913	Girton		
1913–1914	Cambridge Town		
- Peterborough & Fletton United
- Brotherhood Engineering Works
1919–1920	Wellingborough Town		
1920–1935	West Ham United	462	(298)
1935–1936	Southampton	36	(14)
- Cambridge Town
Total		498	(312)

International career
1923–1930	England	5	(4)
- * Club domestic league appearances and goals

Victor Martin Watson (10 November 1897 – 3 August 1988) was an English professional footballer who played most of his club football for West Ham United.

== Club career ==
=== Early career ===
Watson began his career in his native Cambridgeshire, starting his career playing football for hometown club Girton in 1912. After a year, Watson joined Cambridge Town, before moving onto Peterborough & Fletton United in 1914. Watson also represented his works team, Brotherhood Engineering Works.

On 2 November 1914, following the outbreak of World War I a few months prior, Watson joined the British Army. During the war, Watson fought in both the Cambridgeshire Regiment and the Northamptonshire Regiment. During the war, Watson began a sergeant.

Following the culmination of World War I, Watson signed for Wellingborough Town in 1919.

=== West Ham United ===
In March 1920, Watson signed for West Ham United for a fee of £50, bringing him in to provide cover for Syd Puddefoot. On 25 September 1920, Watson made his debut for West Ham, starting in a 0–0 draw away to Cardiff City. In his third game for the club, on 4 October 1920, Watson scored his first goal for the Hammers, scoring the only goal in a 1–0 away at Coventry City. Owing to Puddefoot's form, Watson only made nine appearances for West Ham in his first season at the club, mainly playing at outside-left. In February 1922, Puddefoot signed for Falkirk for a world record fee of £5,000, allowing Watson to establish himself as a centre forward for the club. On 30 December 1922, Watson scored his first West Ham hat-trick, scoring all three West Ham goals in a 3–1 win against Coventry at Highfield Road. Watson also recorded his first four goal haul for the club for the first time on 31 March 1923, in a 5–1 win away to Crystal Palace. At the end of the 1922–23 season, Watson was part of the West Ham side that reached the 1923 FA Cup final, losing 2–0 to Bolton Wanderers. Despite the cup final loss, West Ham won the Second Division two days later, beating Sheffield Wednesday 2–0 away, to gain promotion to the First Division for the first time in their history. Watson scored 27 goals in all competitions for West Ham across the 1922–23 season, with five coming en route to the FA Cup final.

During the early months of the 1923–24 season, Watson suffered a broken toe. Billy Moore deputised for Watson, scoring nine league goals. The following season, Watson scored 22 goals in 41 league games. During the 1925–26 season, Watson scored 20 goals in 38 league games. Watson netted 34 goals in 42 First Division games during the 1926–27 season, as West Ham finished sixth. After 16 goals in 1927–28, Watson scored 29 goals in 34 league games during the 1928–29 campaign, including six goals in an 8–2 home win against Leeds on 9 February 1929.

Watson's best season for West Ham came in the 1929–30 season, as he scored 50 goals in 44 appearances in all competitions as West Ham finished seventh in the First Division. With 41 First Division goals, Watson was the division's top scorer, scoring hat-tricks at home and away against Aston Villa and another against Leeds in March 1930. Watson also scored four against the same opposition in an FA Cup fourth round tie in the January.

Watson's impressive form continued into the 1930–31 campaign, scoring four goals at home against Liverpool in a 7–0 win on 1 September 1930. The 7–0 rout resulted in the Hammers sitting top of the First Division. West Ham eventually finished 18th, with Watson scoring 14 goals in 18 games. Despite scoring 23 First Division goals in the 1931–32 season, West Ham finished bottom of the table, being relegated back to the second tier. Back in the Second Division, West Ham narrowly missed out on a second consecutive relegation in 1933, finishing one place above the relegation zone in 20th place, as Watson scored 24 goals in the league. West Ham's fortunes improved the 1933–34 season, finishing seventh, with Watson scoring 29 times in all competitions. Watson struggled for game time in his final season at West Ham, making 15 appearances, scoring nine times. Watson's last goal for the club came on 26 December 1934, in a 3–0 win against Bury, with his final game for the club being a 0–0 draw against Manchester United on 9 March 1935.

Watson is the club's record goalscorer with 326 goals: 298 in the League and 28 in the FA Cup. 203 of his league goals were from 295 top flight appearances. Watson scored six goals on one occasion for the club, scoring four goals on three occasions and managing 13 hat-tricks whilst at West Ham.

=== Southampton ===
In June 1935, Watson linked up with former West Ham captain George Kay, now manager of Southampton. Whilst at Southampton, Watson managed one hat-trick for the Saints, coming in a 7–2 win against Nottingham Forest on 15 February 1936. Upon scoring the trio of goals, at the age of 38, Watson became the oldest player to score three in one game for the club - a record that still stands to this day. Watson scored in his final professional game, scoring Southampton's only goal in a 3–1 loss away at Barnsley on 25 April 1936.

Watson spent one season with Southampton before retiring from professional football and he was the club's top scorer with 14 goals in 36 league appearances.

=== Cambridge Town ===
Following his professional career, Watson returned to Cambridge Town as a trainer-coach, who he had played for in his youth. In 1936, Watson also made sporadic appearances for the club. Watson was part of the Cambridge coaching staff as the side won the East Anglian Cup in 1946.

== International career ==
Following his goalscoring exploits in the Second Division for West Ham, Watson was rewarded with an England call-up in March 1923. On 5 March 1923, Watson scored on his England debut, scoring England's second, in a 2–2 draw against Wales. A month later, Watson made his second appearance for England, scoring again in another 2–2 draw against Scotland.

Due to his exploits for West Ham during the 1929–30 season, Watson returned to the England side just under seven years after his last appearance, scoring the opening two goals in a 5–2 win against Scotland on 5 April 1930. Watson would go onto make two final appearances for England in May 1930, playing against Germany and Austria.

== Personal life ==
Watson and his wife Kathleen had five children together, one of whom, John, died at four days old. Watson played hours after his death in an FA Cup tie against West Bromwich Albion, scoring the opening goal in a 2–0 win on 28 January 1933.

Watson's nephew, Harry Cranfield, was also a professional footballer, playing in the Football League for Fulham and Bristol Rovers.

== Death and legacy ==
Upon retiring from professional football, he returned to Cambridgeshire. He became a market gardener in Girton.

Watson died on 3 August 1988 at the age of 90.

In June 2010, a plaque honouring Watson was unveiled in Girton.

== Honours ==
West Ham United

- Football League Second Division runner-up: 1922–23
- FA Cup runner-up: 1922–23

England

- British Home Championship: 1930
