= Bert Scriven =

English footballer

Personal information
- Full name: Herbert Richard Scriven
- Date of birth: 2 February 1908
- Place of birth: Winsor, Hampshire, England
- Date of death: 2001 (aged 92–93)
- Height: 5 ft 10 in (1.78 m)
- Position: Goalkeeper

Senior career*
Years	Team	Apps	(Gls)
- Andover
- Totton
1929–1937	Southampton	225	(0)
1938–1939	Salisbury City		
- * Club domestic league appearances and goals

Herbert Richard Scriven (2 February 1908 – 2001) was an English professional footballer who played as a goalkeeper for Southampton in the 1930s.

== Football career ==
Scriven was born in Winsor on the edge of the New Forest and started his football career with local non-league sides Andover and Totton before he joined Southampton in December 1929.

He made his first-team debut when he took over from the veteran Willie White for the fourth match of the 1930–31 Second Division season on 8 September 1930, a 2–1 defeat at Oldham Athletic. Scriven soon became established as first-choice goalkeeper although he lost his place to White for the last eight matches of the season. White retained the No. 1 shirt for the first seven matches of the following season, before Scriven claimed it back in September 1931. From then on, Scriven rarely missed a match over the next two and a half years until February 1934 when manager George Kay replaced him with the 20-year-old Billy Light. Scriven was recalled when Light displaced his left knee cap in a collision after only four matches, and retained the goalkeeper's shirt until March 1935 when, after a run of eight matches without a victory, Kay once again replaced him with Light.

In March 1936, Light was sold to West Bromwich Albion for a fee of £2,000 to help reduce the club's debts, and Scriven was once again recalled to the side. He retained his place as first-choice custodian until he retired in the summer of 1937. In his seven seasons with the Saints, Scriven made a total of 233 first-team appearances.

== Later life ==
Following his retirement, Scriven became the licensee at the Bear and Ragged Staff pub at Michelmersh, near Romsey. During this time, he made a few appearances for Salisbury City.

After World War II, he moved to a farm near Marlow where he was still living in 1992.
