= Walter Pollard =

English footballer

- Pollard with West Ham United

Personal information
- Full name: Walter Pollard
- Date of birth: 26 September 1906
- Place of birth: Burnley, England
- Date of death: 26 July 1945 (aged 38)
- Height: 5 ft 9 in (1.75 m)
- Position: Inside forward

Senior career*
Years	Team	Apps	(Gls)
1925–1929	Burnley	20	(4)
1929–1933	West Ham United	37	(3)
1933–1934	Sochaux	?	(?)
1934	Fulham	0	(0)
1934–1936	Southampton	23	(3)
1936–1937	Brighton & Hove Albion	0	(0)
1936–1937	Tunbridge Wells Rangers	?	(?)
- * Club domestic league appearances and goals

Walter Pollard (26 September 1906 – 26 July 1945) was an English professional footballer who played as an inside forward. Pollard died from a heart attack, aged 38, in 1945.

== Early years ==
Pollard was born 26 September 1906 in Burnley Lancashire to Robert Pollard and Margaret Ellen Atkinson. He was the youngest of three sons. The family lived at 55 Nairne Street in Burnley. Walter's father was a moulder of sanitary wares. By 1921, aged fourteen, Walter worked as a cotton weaver for the Wood Top Manufacturing Company in Burnley. By this time, the family had moved a few doors down to 68 Nairne Street.

Pollard married Gladys May Harrison in the September quarter of 1935 in West Ham.

== Death ==
Pollard died from a heart attack 26 July 1945 in Ilford, Essex. He was just 38 years old.
