= Johnny McIlwaine =

Scottish footballer

Personal information
- Full name: John Arkison McIlwaine
- Date of birth: 12 June 1904
- Place of birth: Irvine, Scotland
- Date of death: 24 April 1980 (aged 75)
- Place of death: Grimsby, England
- Height: 5 ft 9 in (1.75 m)
- Positions: Centre half; centre forward

Youth career
- Springside Juvenile

Senior career*
Years	Team	Apps	(Gls)
- Benwhat Heatherbell
- Irvine Victoria
1925–1928	Falkirk	62	(8)
1928–1930	Portsmouth	56	(5)
1930–1932	Southampton	46	(9)
1932–1933	Llanelly		
1933–1937	Southampton	81	(9)

International career
1927	Scottish League XI	1	(0)

Managerial career
- 1936–1937: Southampton (assistant manager)
- 1937–1948: Grimsby Town (assistant manager)
- * Club domestic league appearances and goals

John Arkison McIlwaine (12 June 1904 – 24 April 1980) was a Scottish footballer who played as a centre half for Portsmouth, where he captained the team in the 1929 FA Cup Final, before moving to south coast rivals Southampton. He also played for Falkirk and Llanelly, whom he helped win the Welsh Football League championship in 1932–33.

== Football career ==
=== Falkirk ===
McIlwaine was born at Irvine, North Ayrshire and after a spell with Irvine Victoria he joined Falkirk. At Falkirk, he became one of the outstanding centre-halves in Scottish football and was selected to represent the Scottish League against the Irish League in October 1927 (the SFL won 2–1). He soon became a target for several top English clubs, and in February 1928 it "caused a sensation in the football world" when he chose to join Portsmouth who were struggling to avoid relegation in their first season in the First Division.

=== Portsmouth ===
McIlwaine joined Portsmouth for a record transfer fee of £5000 (including a friendly match at Fratton Park), replacing Harry Foxall who retired shortly afterwards. He made his debut at home to Sunderland on 18 February 1928 in a 5–3 defeat (four of Sunderland's goals came from Dave Halliday), but retained his place for the remaining games that season as Pompey avoided relegation by one point.

In the 1928–29 season, McIlwaine captained the team and led them to their first Cup Final, beating fellow First Division clubs, West Ham United and Aston Villa en route. In the final itself, despite dogged defending, Portsmouth were defeated by Bolton Wanderers with two late goals.

The following year, McIlwaine lost his place at centre-half to Bob Kearney, who had been recently recruited from Dundee. At the end of the season, he was transferred to Southampton for a fee of £2650; in his two and a half seasons at Fratton Park, McIlwaine played 62 games scoring 5 goals.

=== Southampton ===
McIlwaine was recruited to Southampton by manager Arthur Chadwick as a replacement for the ageing Bert Shelley, and made his debut on 30 August 1930, behind his former Portsmouth colleagues Willie Haines and Jerry Mackie, in a 5–0 defeat at Preston. Two games later, McIlwaine was injured and was unable to return until 29 November, when he was played at centre forward replacing Bill Fraser (who had taken over from Haines who was also injured). He scored twice in his first match at No.9 but after six matches (in which he scored five goals) Haines returned and McIlwaine reverted to centre half, replacing Shelley. McIlwaine retained the No.5 shirt for the rest of the season with the "Saints" finishing in mid-table.

Chadwick resigned at the end of the season and was replaced by George Kay. After seven matches of the 1931–32 season, Kay dropped McIlwaine and recalled Shelley. For the remainder of the season, McIlwaine was in and out of the side, occasionally playing at centre forward. At the end of the season, an unhappy McIlwaine refused to sign a new contract and was placed on the transfer list at a fee of £2500. No Football League clubs were interested, but Southampton refused to release his registration. Prevented from moving to another Football League club, McIlwaine moved to Wales in the 1932 close season, joining Llanelly of the Welsh League.

McIlwaine spent the 1932–33 season at Llanelly, helping the team to win the Welsh League, before returning to Southampton in August 1933. On his return to The Dell, he found that his time in the lower league had not sharpened his game and he spent most of the 1933–34 season in the reserves.

By the start of the following season, his confidence had returned and he reclaimed the centre half shirt from Arthur Bradford in mid-September. He missed only one match from September until the beginning of March, when he was once again used as a makeshift centre forward, replacing Norman Cole. In his eight appearances in the No.9 shirt he scored six goals, only two fewer than Cole had managed all season.

Saints started the 1935–36 season (their fiftieth season since the club's foundation in 1885) with four wins and two draws from their first six matches, but were unable to sustain this form and in the period to the New Year they won only three more matches. One of these was the "golden jubilee" match against Tottenham Hotspur on 23 November 1935, when McIlwaine was captain in a 2–0 victory. In June 1936, after another poor season, in which the Saints finished in seventeenth place, nine members of the board resigned and manager George Kay left to take over at Liverpool, taking trainer Bert Shelley with him. Kay's position as manager was filled by the promotion of George Goss, the company secretary, who took charge of the team, with McIlwaine taking on the role of assistant manager.

As well as his duties as assistant manager, McIlwaine continued as team captain and became first-team coach. In the first edition of the Southampton Football Echo of the 1936–37 season, the sports editor commented on the expansion of McIlwaines's "job description":

"It seems to me to be asking a tremendous lot of one man to be player, captain and assistant manager. That looks to me to be an outsized man's job. He will need all the good wishes possible, and he has mine."

After a year, in which he only made three further appearances, these new duties proved too much and in the summer of 1937, with Goss having handed over to Tom Parker in March, McIlwaine decided to leave.

In his two periods with Southampton, McIlwaine made a total of 121 appearances, scoring 18 goals.

== Assistant manager at Grimsby Town ==
In July 1937, McIlwaine became assistant manager at Grimsby Town under their newly appointed manager, the former England international defender, Charlie Spencer. Grimsby were then playing in the First Division and narrowly avoided relegation at the end of the 1937–38 season.

The following season, Spencer had assembled a fine squad, including former Liverpool centre forward Fred Howe, Jimmy Boyd (who had won the FA Cup with Newcastle United in 1932) and Tommy Jones from Blackpool. Grimsby performed far better in the league, finishing in tenth place in the table, whilst in the FA Cup, they reached the semi-final against Wolverhampton Wanderers, having defeated fellow First Division team Chelsea in the previous round. The semi-final was played at Old Trafford on 25 March 1939 in front of a crowd of 76,962 spectators; this remains the record attendance at Old Trafford. In the semi-final, Grimsby were no match for Wolves and were "simply swept aside", going down 5–0, although their cause was not helped by having goal-keeper George Moulson injured early on in the match and having to play with only ten men and an outfield player in goal.

McIlwaine remained at Blundell Park until 1948, when he left the club and opened a masseur practice in Grimsby. He remained in Grimsby for the rest of his life, dying there in April 1980, aged 75.

== Honours ==
Portsmouth

- FA Cup runner-up: 1928–29

Llanelly

- Welsh League: 1932–33
