= Tom Brewis =

English footballer

Personal information
- Full name: John Thomas Brewis
- Date of birth: 21 April 1907
- Place of birth: Tynemouth, England
- Date of death: 5 April 1975 (aged 67)
- Place of death: Portsmouth, England
- Height: 5 ft 8 in (1.73 m)
- Position: Inside forward

Youth career
- Preston Colliery

Senior career*
Years	Team	Apps	(Gls)
1928–1929	West Stanley		
1929–1930	Newark Town		
1930–1932	York City	26	(11)
1932–1937	Southampton	118	(18)
1937–1939	Newport (IOW)		
- * Club domestic league appearances and goals

John Thomas Brewis (21 April 1907 – 5 April 1975) was an English footballer who played as an inside-forward in the 1930s, spending most of his career with Southampton.

== Football career ==
=== Early career ===
Brewis was born in Tynemouth and played his early football with various colliery clubs, including West Stanley (in the North Eastern League, from where he joined Newark Town of the Midland League in 1929.

After a year at Newark, now aged 23, Brewis moved into the Football League when he was signed by York City of the Third Division North in July 1930. He spent two seasons at York, mostly used as cover for Tom Fenoughty, making 26 league and two FA Cup appearances.

=== Southampton ===
In March 1932, Brewis was signed for Southampton of the Second Division by recently appointed manager George Kay as cover for Bill Fraser and Arthur Wilson. Brewis made his debut on 19 March 1932, replacing Charlie Sillett who had been drafted in at inside-left whilst Wilson was injured, before losing his place on Wilson's return for the following match, although Brewis made a further five appearances in the 1931–32 season.

During the summer of 1932, the Saints' worsening financial position resulted in the sales of both Fraser (to Fulham) and Wilson (to West Ham United) leaving Brewis as the only recognised inside-right, with Herbert Coates being recalled at inside-left. Despite the sales in the summer, the Saints' side had a settled look in 1932–33, with ten players making 30 or more appearances. Brewis and Coates became established as the inside-forwards, with Ted Drake in the centre, and Dick Neal and Johnny Arnold on the wings. Brewis scored ten goals from 31 League appearances, including a hat-trick in a 4–1 victory over Manchester United on 3 September 1932. Described as "not a tall man", Brewis "had the knack of hanging in the air to head improbable goals".

Brewis retained his place for the next two seasons, although he missed a substantial part of the 1934–35 season, when he was replaced by Fred Tully. For the following season, Tully became the settled No.8, and Brewis played less than half the matches, mostly as a half-back. Although Brewis remained at The Dell for a further year, he only appeared three timers in 1936–37, before he was released in the 1937 close season.

Brewis then spent two seasons on the Isle of Wight with Newport before joining the Royal Navy in 1939.

== Later career ==
After the war, Brewis became a publican, running the Durham Hotel in Northam, Southampton.
