= George Kay (footballer) =

English football player and manager (1891–1954)

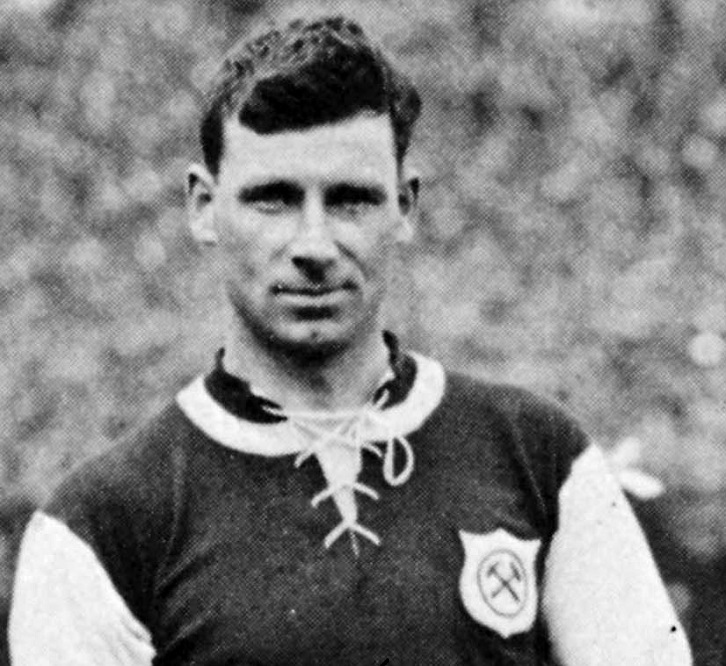

Personal information
- Date of birth: 21 September 1891
- Place of birth: Manchester, England
- Date of death: 18 April 1954 (aged 62)
- Place of death: Liverpool, England
- Height: 5 ft 10 in (1.78 m)
- Position: Centre-half

Youth career
- Eccles

Senior career*
Years	Team	Apps	(Gls)
1911	Bolton Wanderers	3	(0)
1911–1915	Distillery	91	(14)
1919–1926	West Ham United	237	(15)
1927	Stockport County	2	(0)
Total		333	(29)

Managerial career
- 1929–1931: Luton Town
- 1931–1936: Southampton
- 1936–1951: Liverpool
- * Club domestic league appearances and goals

George Kay (21 September 1891 – 18 April 1954) was an English football player and manager of Luton Town, Southampton and Liverpool.

The highlight of his playing career was when he captained West Ham United in the first FA Cup final to be played at Wembley, the White Horse Final.

He was manager of Liverpool FC for 14 years and 5 months, August 1936 to January 1951, and led them to the Football League title in 1947, the first post-war football season, as well as taking them to the 1950 FA Cup Final (the club's first in thirty-six years).

== Playing career ==
Kay was born in Manchester and joined Bolton Wanderers in 1911. After failing to agree re-signing terms, he joined Belfast club Distillery at the start of the 1911–12 season, helping to win the Gold Cup and the CAS despite a long-term injury interrupting his playing career, and becoming the first Englishman to captain an Irish Football League representative team.

He served with the Royal Garrison Artillery during the First World War and, following the war, he moved back to England to join West Ham United in July 1919, where he spent the next seven seasons. He made his debut at home against Barnsley in September 1919 and, having taken over the captaincy from Billy Cope for the 1922–23 season, led the West Ham side that gained promotion to the First Division and reached the FA Cup Final against his former club, Bolton Wanderers, in 1923. This was the first FA Cup final to be played at Wembley, the so-called White Horse Final. He was one of the few members of the Cup Final side never to win an international cap but became the first West Ham player to play over 200 league games for the club.

Even at this age, Kay's health was never good and on a tour of Spain in 1926 he fell ill and he remained in Spain for three weeks before he was fit enough to return to England. As a result, he retired from active playing, although he did turn out twice for Stockport County in 1927.

=== Appearances for West Ham United ===
Season	League		FA Cup		Total	
Season	Apps	Goals	Apps	Goals	Apps	Goals
1919–20	27	3	4	0	31	3
1920–21	36	1	1	0	37	1
1921–22	39	5	3	0	42	5
1922–23	36	0	5	0	42	5
1923–24	40	3	3	1	43	4
1924–25	41	2	6	1	47	3
1925–26	18	1	0	0	18	1
Total	237	15	22	2	259	17

== Management career ==
=== Luton Town ===
In 1927, he became coach at Luton Town, before moving up to manager in 1929. In his two seasons as manager, the Hatters languished in mid-table in the Third Division South, finishing 13th and 7th, before Kay accepted the challenge to run Southampton in May 1931.

=== Southampton ===
He joined Southampton in May 1931, following the resignation of Arthur Chadwick, who had stood down after Saints had embarked on a policy of selling their best players to survive financially.

In an effort to rebuild the club's fortunes and help them survive during these difficult times financially, Kay created Saints' first nursery side, and before long a new generation of young players came into the first team having come through the nursery ranks, including Ted Drake (who later joined Arsenal and played for England) and Charlie Sillett (father of John and Peter), thus ushering in a new era for the club.

Kay "was tremendously enthusiastic and he worked hard throughout his stay at The Dell, using up a considerable amount of nervous energy at every match. He 'played' every kick and his body would visibly vibrate to the stresses and strains on the playing field".

During Kay's five seasons at The Dell, Southampton languished in Division 2, finishing each season in the lower half of the table and being eliminated from the FA Cup each year in the early stages. He started his Southampton career brightly with an opening day victory over Burnley on 29 August 1931 and by mid-September they topped the division. Such form could not last, however, and injuries soon resulted in the club sliding down the table. Kay was unable to field a settled side and used 30 different players during the season, including six different centre forwards. Other than the emergence of youngsters such as Drake and Sillett, the bright spots of this first season in charge were Johnny Arnold, who was top scorer with 20 goals, and Arthur Haddleton, who scored in eight consecutive games at the start of the season.

During the 1932 close season, in order to balance the books several players left the club including Bill Fraser, Bert Jepson and Haddleton (who all joined Fulham), Johnny McIlwaine (who joined Llanelli after failure to agree terms) and Willie Haines, who retired to join Weymouth. Despite the large number of departures the team had a more settled look about it and during the 1932–33 season Kay had a squad of 15 players of whom twelve were the mainstay of the side. Led by Ted Drake, the team improved slightly on the previous season, winning a club record 15 out of 21 home matches, but only registering three away victories. Once again the directors needed to raise cash and in February 1933 they sold Arnold and Mike Keeping to Fulham for a combined fee of £5,000. Jimmy McIntyre, the former Saints manager now in charge at Fulham boasted that this was "the best deal I ever brought off". The fans were now disillusioned with the club and attendances dropped to record lows, with only 2,949 turning out for the match against Bradford City on 25 February, well below the break-even target of 14,000. Despite the financial difficulties faced by the club, the team were not badly affected and ended the season in mid-table.

In the 1933–34 season, Saints equalled the record of 15 home victories, but their away form was abysmal failing to win even once and picking up only six draws. The most significant events of the season involved Ted Drake, who scored a hat trick in the opening day's match against Bradford City, was sent off against Grimsby Town in December and, inevitably, was sold for a record fee of £6,000 to Arsenal in March. Despite finishing his Saints season two months early, Drake was comfortably the side's top scorer with 22 league goals, with no other player managing more than six. As a result of their poor away form, Saints ended the season well down the table in 14th place.

The departure of Drake, although balancing the club's finances, left a large gap in the Saints forward line which Kay was not able to fill satisfactorily. In the summer of 1934, Kay signed Laurie Fishlock from Millwall as a winger and promoted Norman Cole from the reserves, but the side lacked any real firepower. McIlwaine returned from his "exile" at Llanelli in an effort to bolster the defence. The season started badly with only two points from the first five games. The depressing form continued until Christmas, when the team won three consecutive matches, including their first away victory (against Swansea Town) ending a run of 33 away games without a win. They managed only one further away victory and were serious candidates for relegation, finishing the season in 19th place. Cole was top scorer with eight league goals as Saints managed a miserly total of only 46 goals. The club's finances were now so dire that the supporters club had to make a loan of £200 to help finance the summer wage bill.

1935–36 was Southampton's fiftieth season since their original formation in 1885, but the club approached their jubilee season in a gloomy state with little to celebrate. They did, however, venture into the transfer market signing centre-forward Vic Watson from Kay's former club West Ham United. The team made a superb start to the season with four wins and two draws in the first six games and by the end of September Saints were top of the table. Once again, this form could not be sustained, and only three further games were won before the new year. The slump continued into 1936 being partly relieved by a 7–2 victory over Nottingham Forest on 15 February. On 28 March Saints suffered their heaviest-ever league defeat, going down 8–0 away to Tottenham Hotspur and two days later had their lowest ever home attendance for a league match, when only 1,875 turned out on a Monday night to witness a 1–0 defeat against Port Vale. Predictably, the directors responded by selling their better players, with goalkeeper Billy Light (another product of the nursery side) being sold to West Bromwich Albion for £2,000. Once again Saints finished the season in a disappointing 17th position, with Watson top-scorer on 14 goals.

In June 1936, the entire board of directors resigned, to be replaced with a new board. In order to reduce the company's wage bill, the new board asked Kay to resign. In August, Kay accepted an offer from Liverpool along with long-serving trainer Bert Shelley. Kay's position as manager at Southampton was filled by the promotion of George Goss, the company secretary, who took charge of the team, with captain Johnny McIlwaine taking on the role of assistant manager.

=== Liverpool ===
At Southampton, severe financial problems and the continual sale of the club's best players, prevented Kay from realising his full potential as a manager. He was, however, experienced, well respected and knowledgeable and not afraid to try out new ideas, and the combination of these qualities brought him to Liverpool's attention when it was clear that George Patterson would be unable to continue the managerial side of his role.

Kay's career as Liverpool manager started poorly, with only three wins and four draws from the first twelve matches. This run included a 2–6 defeat at Portsmouth's Fratton Park on 2 September and a 2–5 defeat at Brentford; the only bright spot in this spell was a 7–1 victory over Grimsby Town on 12 September, with two goals from Fred Howe. Results improved slightly as the season progressed and Liverpool finished Kay's first season in charge in 18th place in Division 1.

Despite the set-back of an opening day 1–6 defeat at Chelsea's Stamford Bridge, Liverpool finished the 1937–38 season comfortably in mid-table, with Alf Hanson top scorer on 14 league goals. In the following season, Liverpool again finished in 11th position in the table, with Berry Nieuwenhuys, Willie Fagan and Phil Taylor joint top scorers in the league with 14 goals each.

In readiness for the next season, Kay snapped up young defender Bob Paisley on a free transfer from Bishop Auckland, as well as another future Liverpool legend Billy Liddell, but all their careers were then interrupted by the outbreak of World War II.

After the war, the club took the unusual decision to tour the United States and Canada. It was Kay's theory that the climate and diet in North America would be extremely beneficial to the players. The punishing schedule of 10 matches in less than a month meant that the Liverpool squad started the first post-war season in far better physical shape than many of their competitors.

The season started slowly, with four victories and three defeats in the first seven games. The victories included a 7–4 match against Chelsea on 7 September, in which Bob Paisley made his league debut for the club and Billy Liddell scored his first league goal. There was also a 5–0 defeat away to Manchester United (played at Maine Road). Things began to improve and a run of seven consecutive victories in February and March set the club on the way to the championship.

Liverpool had a long run in the F.A. Cup, eventually going out to Burnley in the semi-final, after a replay. The club did, however, pick up the Lancashire Senior Cup, Lancashire County Combination Championship Cup and Liverpool Senior Cup along the way.

As the season reached its climax, several clubs were still in contention and on 31 May 1947 Liverpool went to Molineux to meet the leaders, Wolverhampton Wanderers needing to win to take the championship, as well as other results going in their favour. Liverpool won the match 2–1, other results went their way and the Reds were champions of the Football League for a fifth time. It was George Kay's finest moment as a football manager.

Top scorers in the Championship season were Jack Balmer and Albert Stubbins with 24 league goals each. They continued to be prolific scorers during Kay's period in charge but the club was unable to come close to another championship, finishing each of the next three seasons in the lower part of the top half of the table. In 1950, they reached the FA Cup Final for the first time in 36 years, but the match at Wembley ended in a 2–0 victory for Arsenal.

By now, Kay was clearly not a well man and he retired in January 1951 and he died in Liverpool three years later on 18 April 1954.

== Honours ==
=== As a player ===
Lisburn Distillery

- Gold Cup: 1914
- County Antrim Shield: 1915
- City Cup: 1913

West Ham United

- Football League Second Division runner-up: 1922–23
- FA Cup runner-up: 1922–23

=== As a manager ===
Liverpool

- Football League First Division: 1946–47
- FA Cup runner-up: 1949–50

== See also ==
- List of English football championship winning managers
