= Laurie Fishlock =

English cricketer

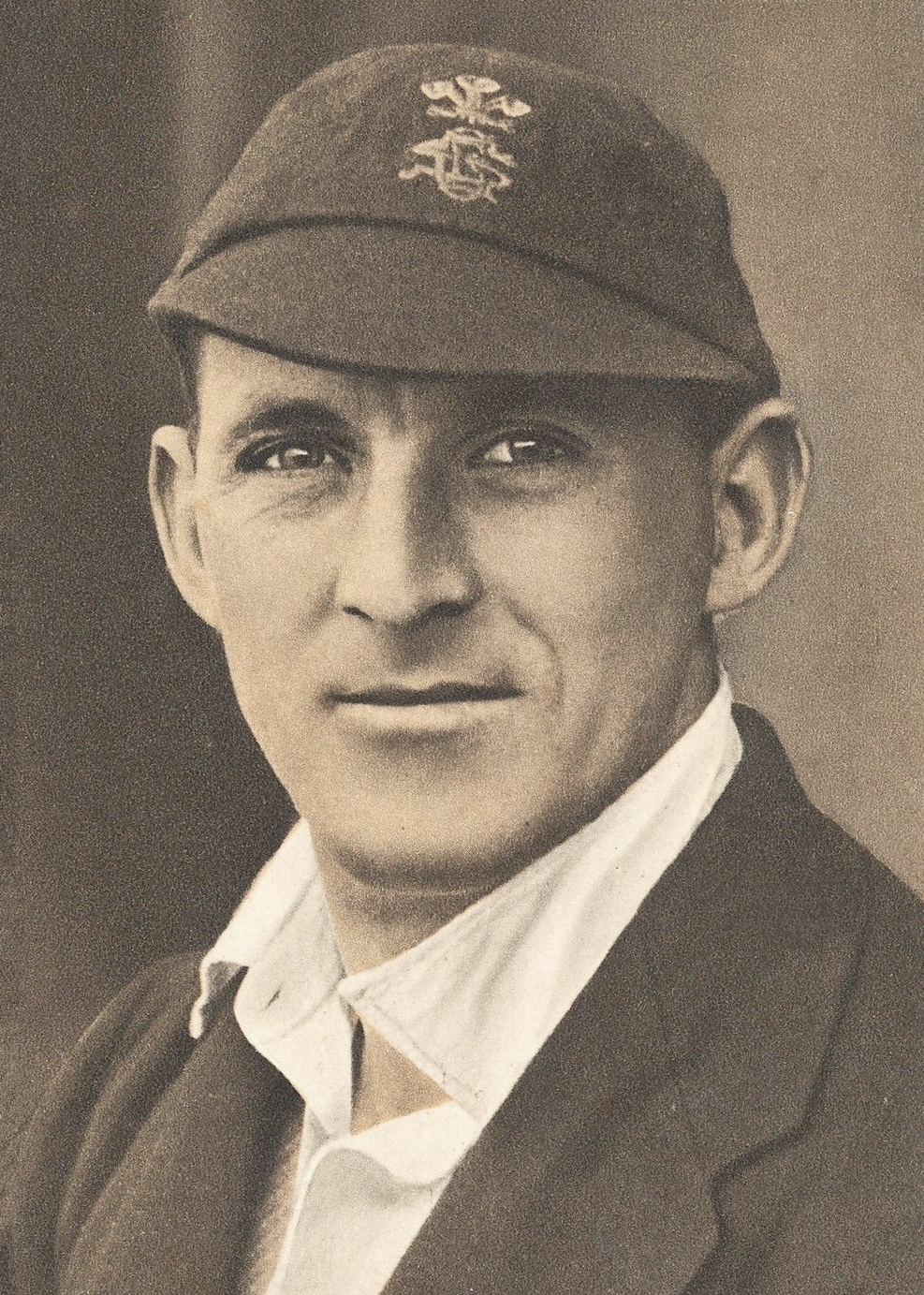
- Fishlock in about 1935

Personal information
- Full name: Laurence Barnard Fishlock
- Born: 2 January 1907; Battersea, London, England
- Died: 25 June 1986 (aged 79); Sutton, London, England
- Batting: Left-handed
- Bowling: Slow left-arm orthodox

International information
- National side: England
- Test debut: 25 July 1936 v India
- Last Test: 28 February 1947 v Australia

Career statistics
Competition	Test	First-class
Matches	4	417
Runs scored	47	25,376
Batting average	11.75	39.34
100s/50s	0/0	56/135
Top score	19*	253
Balls bowled	–	859
Wickets	–	11
Bowling average	–	45.81
5 wickets in innings	–	0
10 wickets in match	–	0
Best bowling	–	4/62
Catches/stumpings	1/–	216/–
- Source: CricInfo, 10 September 2022

Laurence Barnard Fishlock (2 January 1907 – 25 June 1986) was an English cricketer, who played in four Test matches from 1936 to 1947. A specialist batsman, he achieved little in those four matches, but might have had a much more substantial Test career had he not lost six of what should have been his best years to World War II.

Colin Bateman, a cricket writer, noted that "Fishlock, a good county performer, was astonishingly unlucky when his Test chance did come along... A forcing left-hander, he went on two Ashes tours (1936–37) and (1946–47) and suffered hand injuries both times, restricting him to one Test overseas".

== Cricket career ==
He joined the staff of Surrey in 1930, and made his first-class debut the following season. However, he did not play in a substantial number of matches until 1934, when he made 598 runs with an average of 31.47. In 1935 he was a regular member of the side and passed 1,000 runs for the first time, and scored his first three hundreds. The following year he came right to the fore. He made 2,129 runs at an average of 53.22. He was selected for the Players at Lord's, played in two Test trials and was selected for two Tests against India. He was selected for the following winter's tour of Australia, but missed six weeks through a broken bone in his right hand, and thus missed his chance to press for a Test place. During the 1937 season, he switched to opening the batting for Surrey, and occupied that batting position for most of the remainder of his career. He continued to score heavily, and was selected for a Test trial in 1938, in which he made a hundred, but even so could not force his way into the Test team.

He had trained as an engineer, and during World War II he made aircraft parts for the RAF. After the war, he had a fine season in 1946, with 2,241 runs at an average of 50.47. As a result, he played in one Test against India and was selected as a Wisden Cricketer of the Year in the 1947 edition. He went on the 1946-7 tour of Australia and played in his fourth and final Test. In 1948 he made his highest score, 253 against Leicestershire at Grace Road, Leicester. In his final season of 1952, when he was 45 years old, he still made his 1,000 runs and helped Surrey to win the Championship, the first of their record sequence of seven victories. Later he was a coach at Trinity School of John Whitgift, Croydon and St Dunstan's College.

== Football career ==
Fishlock also played professional football as a winger, including three seasons (1929–1932) with Crystal Palace (19 senior appearances, two goals), one season (1933–34) with Millwall (36 senior appearances, seven goals) and two with Southampton (1934–1936). Prior to turning professional, he had played for Dulwich Hamlet and in amateur international fixtures for England. He played professionally for Aldershot and Gillingham.

== Death ==
Fishlock died in hospital following an operation, in Sutton, London, in June 1986, aged 79.
