= Norman Cole (footballer) =

English footballer

Personal information
- Full name: Norman Philip Cole
- Date of birth: 7 November 1913
- Place of birth: Woolston, Southampton, England
- Date of death: 29 November 1976 (aged 63)
- Place of death: Southampton, England
- Height: 5 ft 10 in (1.78 m)
- Position: Centre-forward

Youth career
- Itchen Sports
- Thornycrofts
- Newport (IOW)

Senior career*
Years	Team	Apps	(Gls)
1932–1935	Southampton	34	(13)
1935–1936	Norwich City	1	(0)
- * Club domestic league appearances and goals

Norman Philip Cole (7 November 1913 – 29 November 1976) was an English footballer who played in the 1930s at centre-forward, spending most of his career with Southampton.

== Football career ==
Cole was born in Woolston, Southampton and was educated firstly at Sholing School and then at Taunton's School in Shirley, Southampton. He played football for both schools as well as the local Itchen Sports, before joining the works team from the Thornycroft shipbuilding works at Woolston. From there he joined the Isle of Wight side, Newport, before signing as an amateur for Southampton, then playing in the Football League Second Division, in August 1932, aged 18.

His professional contract came a few months later and after starring in the reserves, he made his first-team debut on 30 December 1933, when he took Ted Drake's place at centre-forward in a 2–2 draw at Bradford City. When top-scorer Drake was sold to Arsenal in March 1934, the "Saints" forward line was rather depleted – despite receiving a record fee of £6,000 for Drake, Southampton's finances were such that manager George Kay was not able to purchase a replacement an, as a result, Cole was promoted from the reserves. The local press described Cole as "big, strong and ruddy of hair" and "vigorous and fast" and at first it seemed that Cole was going to be an adequate replacement for Drake, scoring twice in his first five matches followed by a hat-trick in a 3–2 victory over West Ham United on 7 April 1934.

In the 1934–35 season, both Cole and the whole Saints' team struggled in front of goal, with the team totalling only 46 goals from 42 league games, with Cole ending the season as top scorer in the league with only eight goals from 24 appearances. At the end of February, Cole was dropped by manager Kay, who completely re-shuffled his side in an effort to avoid relegation, with Johnny McIlwaine being moved forward. Kay's plan was successful, with Saints winning four of the last eleven matches and avoiding relegation by eight points.

In the summer of 1935, Cole was transferred to Norwich City where he made only one appearance before retiring from professional football.

== Later career ==
In 1936, Cole returned to Southampton and took up employment with the Southern Railway in Southampton Docks as an engineer. He later worked for Follands at Hamble.

== Family ==
He was first married to Kathleen and had four children. Later he married Grace, and had a further four children.
