= Billy Light =

English footballer

Personal information
- Full name: William Henry Light
- Date of birth: 11 June 1913
- Place of birth: Woolston, Southampton, England
- Date of death: 15 February 1979 (aged 65)
- Height: 5 ft 11 in (1.80 m)
- Position: Goalkeeper

Youth career
- Thornycrofts (Woolston)
- 1931–1932: Harland & Wolff

Senior career*
Years	Team	Apps	(Gls)
1932–1936	Southampton	45	(0)
1936–1938	West Bromwich Albion	28	(0)
1938–1946	Colchester United	30	(0)
Total		103	(0)
- * Club domestic league appearances and goals

William Henry Light (11 June 1913 – 15 February 1979) was an English footballer who played for Southampton and West Bromwich Albion as a goalkeeper in the 1930s.

== Football career ==
=== Southampton ===
Light was born in Woolston, Southampton and played his youth football for the works teams from the local shipyards, John I. Thornycroft & Company and Harland & Wolff. In May 1932, he joined Southampton as an amateur, signing his first professional contract in September 1933.

He made his first-team debut, replacing long-serving 'keeper Bert Scriven, in a 1–0 victory over Swansea Town on 5 February 1934. In only his fourth match, against Hull City at The Dell on 24 February, he displaced his left knee cap in a collision, putting him out of the game for several months.

He eventually returned to the team in March 1935 and retained his place for the rest of the 1934–35 season. He continued as the first choice custodian for the start of the "Saints" golden jubilee season. By now, he had gained a reputation as one of the country's leading goalkeepers and in March 1936, with the club in financial difficulties, he was sold to First Division West Bromwich Albion for a fee of £2,000, causing "a storm of protest" among the club's fans.

=== West Bromwich Albion ===
At The Hawthorns, Light was understudy to England international Harold Pearson and in his three years with the "Baggies", he only made 30 appearances in all. In a league match at Stoke City on 4 February 1937, he conceded 10 goals in Albion's heaviest defeat in the Football League.

=== Colchester United – player and coach ===
Light joined newly formed Colchester United, then in the Southern League, as a player-coach in 1938, helping the new club claim the Southern League title at the end of his first season. After the Second World War, he continued his association with the club, as a trainer, until his eventual retirement in 1968.

== Honours ==
=== Club ===
Colchester United

- Southern Football League champions: 1938–39
