= Frank Campbell (footballer, born 1907) =

Scottish footballer

Personal information
- Full name: Francis Stephen Campbell
- Date of birth: 3 March 1907
- Place of birth: Camlachie, Scotland
- Date of death: 25 January 1985 (aged 77)
- Place of death: Irvine, Scotland
- Height: 5 ft 10 in (1.78 m)
- Position: Half-back

Youth career
- Irvine Meadow

Senior career*
Years	Team	Apps	(Gls)
19??–1931	Irvine Meadow		
1931–1935	Southampton	86	(5)
1935	Newport (IOW)		
1938–1939	Dumbarton	2	(0)
- * Club domestic league appearances and goals

Francis Stephen Campbell (3 March 1907 – 25 January 1985) was a Scottish professional footballer who played as half-back for Southampton in the 1930s.

== Football career ==
Campbell was born in the Camlachie area of Glasgow and played his youth football with Irvine Meadow in the Scottish Intermediate League. Aged 24, he was spotted by scouts from Southampton and he moved to The Dell club in July 1931. His first-team debut came when he took the place of Bill Adams at right-half in a 2–1 debut against Tottenham Hotspur on 7 September 1931. He was in and out of the side for the remainder of the 1931–32 season, sharing the No. 4 shirt with Bert Shelley and Stan Woodhouse, although a fractured thigh put him out for several months mid-season.

He soon developed into a "strong, forceful half-back" and "quickly adapted to life in the English Second Division". In 1932–33, he took over at centre-half at the start of the season, with occasional appearances in the forward line, before reverting to right-half, as the "Saints" continued in relative obscurity in the middle of the Second Division.

He was a virtual ever-present in 1933–34 until March when a knee injury again put him out. His injuries developed into chronic arthritis, which forced him to retire at the start of the 1934–35 season after making a total of 89 appearances for Southampton, with five goals.

== Later career ==
On retirement from league football, Campbell worked for the Folland Aircraft company on the Isle of Wight, playing occasional matches for Newport, before moving to Hatfield, Hertfordshire, where he continued to work in the aircraft industry.
