= Arthur Roberts (footballer, born 1907) =

English footballer (1907–1957)

Personal information
- Full name: Albert Arthur Roberts
- Date of birth: 27 January 1907
- Place of birth: Goldthorpe, England
- Date of death: 27 January 1957 (aged 50)
- Place of death: Elsecar, England
- Height: 5 ft 9 in (1.75 m)
- Position: Full back

Youth career
- Goldthorpe United
- Ardsley Athletic

Senior career*
Years	Team	Apps	(Gls)
1929–1938	Southampton	156	(0)
1938–1939	Swansea Town	16	(0)
1946–1947	York City	1	(0)
- * Club domestic league appearances and goals

Albert Arthur Roberts (27 January 1907 – 27 January 1957) was an English footballer who played as a full back for Southampton in the 1930s.

== Career ==
=== Early life ===
Roberts was born in Goldthorpe, South Yorkshire and played his youth football with Goldthorpe United and Ardsley Athletic, where he was spotted by scouts from Southampton.

=== Southampton ===
He joined Southampton in August 1929 as an understudy to Mike Keeping. It was not until 28 February 1931, 18 months after joining the "Saints", that he made his debut (at right-back in a 2–1 defeat against Swansea Town), with Arthur Bradford moving to the left as a replacement for Keeping. After two matches, he swapped places with Arnold and played on the left for another two matches before Keeping's return.

In each of the next two seasons, Roberts made only a handful of appearances. When Keeping moved to Fulham in February 1933, Arthur Tilford moved to The Dell from Craven Cottage on a short-term contract and stepped into Keeping's position. It was only in August 1933, with Tilford having returned to Fulham, that Roberts was finally able to make the No. 3 shirt his own.

In the 1933–34 season, Roberts made 39 appearances at left-back alongside Bill Adams. He soon established a reputation as a consistent, reliable full-back as Saints ended the season in 14th position in the Second Division. For the start of the following season he lost his place to Charlie Sillett and it was not until February that he once again became a regular member of the team. Once he regained his place in the side, Roberts became the preferred left-back, although he missed substantial parts of each of the seasons from 1935 to 1938 through injury.

In May 1938, he and the club were unable to agree terms for a new contract and he was transfer-listed at a fee of £500. He spent a total of nine years with the Saints, making 161 appearances in all competitions.

=== Later career ===
After leaving the Saints, Roberts spent one season with Swansea Town, but was unable to displace Len Emanuel at left-back. Emanuel's brother, Tom, moved to Southampton in September 1938 as Roberts' replacement.

After World War II, Roberts made one appearance for York City in 1946, before settling in South Yorkshire where he died in 1957, on his fiftieth birthday.
