= 1932–33 Southampton F.C. season =

English football club season

Southampton F.C.
1932–33 season
- Chairman: Sloane Stanley
- Manager: George Kay
- Stadium: The Dell
- Second Division: 12th
- FA Cup: Third round
- Top goalscorer: League: Ted Drake (20); All: Ted Drake (20)
- Highest home attendance: 11,862 v Stoke City (12 November 1932)
- Lowest home attendance: 2,949 v Bradford City (25 February 1933)
- Average home league attendance: 8,779
- Biggest win: 4–0 v Lincoln City (28 January 1933); 6–2 v Notts County (14 April 1933)
- Biggest defeat: 0–5 v Tottenham Hotspur (22 October 1932)
Home colours

The 1932–33 season was the 38th season of competitive football by Southampton, and the club's 11th in the Second Division of the Football League. It was another disappointing campaign for the Saints, who finished mid-table and rarely competed for promotion to the First Division. After a slow start to the season, the club had established themselves in the top half of the table by October with a string of victories. By the end of the calendar year, Southampton had dropped as low as 14th in the Second Division table – the position in which they finished the previous season – after a period of poor form in December. Wins were hard to come by in the second half of the season, but a strong run of results in April meant that the side finished 12th with 18 wins, five draws and 19 losses, seven points above the first relegation place.

In the 1932–33 FA Cup, Southampton were drawn away to fellow Second Division side Stoke City. The Potters, who were challenging for the league championship at the time (and eventually won it), edged the game 1–0 to send the Saints out of the third round of the tournament for the sixth consecutive season, marking their worst run to date. The club ended the season against local rivals Portsmouth in a single game for the Hampshire Benevolent Cup and Rowland Hospital Cup, which they lost 5–0 at Fratton Park. They also competed in the second annual Hampshire Combination Cup, losing 6–0 to Pompey in the semi-final. Southampton played another two friendly matches during the campaign, losing to Third Division South side Gillingham in February and beating a side representing the Tidworth Garrison in March.

Southampton used 21 different players during the 1932–33 season and had twelve different goalscorers. Their top scorer was centre-forward Ted Drake, who scored 20 goals in the Second Division. Outside-left Johnny Arnold, top scorer in the previous season, scored eleven times, followed by inside-right Tom Brewis on ten goals. Eight players were signed by the club during the campaign, with 17 released and sold to other clubs. The average attendance at The Dell during the 1932–33 season was 8,779, their lowest in the Football League to date. The highest attendance of the season was 11,862 against Stoke City on 12 November 1932. The lowest attendance was a record low 2,949 against Bradford City on 25 February 1933, the first home game after the controversial sale of Arnold and left-back Michael Keeping.

== Background and transfers ==
Due to mounting financial problems, Southampton were forced to sell numerous players after the end of the 1931–32 season. Amongst those transferred were centre-forward Arthur Haddleton, outside-right Bert Jepson and inside-right Bill Fraser, all of whom joined Fulham, who had recently been promoted to the Second Division from the Third Division South. Half-back Arthur Wilson was sold to recently relegated West Ham United for £500, goalkeeper Willie White joined Third Division South side Aldershot, inside-left Peter Dougall was transferred to French side Sète, centre-half Johnny McIlwaine joined Welsh club Llanelli for a season, and inside-forward Henry O'Grady signed for Leeds United in the First Division. The club also sold reserve players Fred Allan and Chris Crossley, while Frank Matson was forced to retire due to problems with his eyesight. The end of the season also marked the end of the playing career of right-half Bert Shelley, who had made a then-club record 465 appearances in all competitions since he joined in 1919 (the record remained until 1964, when it was surpassed by left-back Tommy Traynor). Shelley remained at Southampton as a trainer for the youth team.

Alongside the host of departures, Southampton made a number of low-key signings in the summer of 1932. The first arrival was goalkeeper Billy Light, who joined from Harland and Wolff on amateur terms and did not turn professional until more than a year later. Outside-right Fred Dunmore was signed for the reserve team from Derby County in June, when Accrington Stanley goalkeeper Bob Foster was also signed. Winger Jimmy Harris joined from West Ham United in July, followed by centre-forward Norman Cole from Newport (Isle of Wight) in August. After the season had started, inside-left Tom Ruddy was signed from Chesterfield. Also in September, Willie Haines was sold to Weymouth, George Harkus joined Southport as reserve player-coach, and Sid Grover signed for Bournemouth Gasworks Athletic. Half-back Cyril King signed from Plymouth United on amateur terms in November. In February, with the club still suffering financial problems, Fulham bought outside-left Johnny Arnold and left-back Michael Keeping for a combined fee of £5,100. After the arrival of Keeping, Fulham sent regular left-back Arthur Tilford in return to Southampton on a temporary basis.

Players transferred in

Name	Nationality	Pos.	Club	Date	Fee	Ref.
Billy Light	England	GK	(England) Harland and Wolff	May 1932	Free (Note: Billy Light initially joined on amateur terms in May 1932, before turning professional in September 1933.)	
Fred Dunmore	England	FW	(England) Derby County	June 1932	Unknown	
Bob Foster	England	GK	(England) Accrington Stanley	June 1932	Unknown	
Jimmy Harris	England	FW	(England) West Ham United	July 1932	Unknown	
Norman Cole	England	FW	(England) Newport (Isle of Wight)	August 1932	Free (Note: Norman Cole initially joined on amateur terms in August 1932, before turning professional that October.)	
Tom Ruddy	England	FW	(England) Chesterfield	September 1932	Unknown	
Cyril King	England	HB	(England) Plymouth United	November 1932	Free (Note: Cyril King initially joined on amateur terms in November 1932, before turning professional in April 1933.)	
Arthur Tilford	England	FB	(England) Fulham	February 1933	Free (Note: Arthur Tilford joined on a temporary basis from February until May 1933 as an offer of "compassionate leave".)	

Players transferred out

Name	Nationality	Pos.	Club	Date	Fee	Ref.
Fred Allan	England	FW	Unknown	May 1932	Unknown	
Chris Crossley	England	FW	(England) Totton	May 1932	Unknown	
Arthur Haddleton	England	FW	(England) Fulham	June 1932	Unknown	
Bert Jepson	England	FW	(England) Fulham	June 1932	Free	
Arthur Wilson	England	HB	(England) West Ham United	June 1932	£500	
Bill Fraser	England	FW	(England) Fulham	July 1932	£500	
Willie White	Scotland	GK	(England) Aldershot	July 1932	Unknown	
Peter Dougall	Scotland	FW	(France) Sète	August 1932	£500	
Johnny McIlwaine	Scotland	HB	(Wales) Llanelli	August 1932	Free (Note: Johnny McIlwaine was temporarily transferred out to Llanelli, before returning to Southampton in August 1933.)	
Henry O'Grady	England	FW	(England) Leeds United	August 1932	Unknown	
Sid Grover	England	FW	(England) Bournemouth Gasworks Athletic	September 1932	Unknown	
Willie Haines	England	FW	(England) Weymouth	September 1932	Unknown	
George Harkus	England	HB	(England) Southport	September 1932	Unknown	
Johnny Arnold	England	FW	(England) Fulham	February 1933	£5,100	
Michael Keeping	England	FB	(England) Fulham	February 1933	£5,100	

Players retired

Name	Nationality	Pos.	Date	Reason	Ref.
Frank Matson	Wales	FW	May 1932	Retired due to eyesight problems	
Bert Shelley	England	HB	May 1932	Retired due to age; joined coaching staff	

== Second Division ==
Southampton began the 1932–33 season at the bottom of the Second Division table following a 3–0 opening day loss against promotion hopefuls Millwall. A 2–2 home draw with Port Vale was followed by high-profile wins over Manchester United and Bury (as well as a return win over Port Vale), which helped the side move up to seventh in the table. During the opening few months of the campaign, three different players scored their first hat-tricks for the club – Tom Brewis in the 4–2 win against Manchester United, Johnny Arnold in a 4–3 victory over West Ham United and Ted Drake in a 3–0 defeat of Grimsby Town. By the end of the calendar year, the club had dropped to the middle of the table after three straight defeats in December against Burnley, Nottingham Forest and Charlton Athletic. Strong home form – including a club record 15 out of 21 home wins – helped the club secure their Second Division safety relatively comfortably, and they finished in 12th place on 18 wins, five draws and 19 losses.

With the club's financial difficulties continuing to pose problems for the directors, Southampton were forced to sell Johnny Arnold and left-back Michael Keeping in February, both of whom had played in all but two games in the league campaign to date. They joined recently departed players Arthur Haddleton, Bert Jepson, Bill Fraser and former Saints boss Jimmy McIntyre at Fulham, who later described the purchase as "the best deal he had ever made". The sale proved unpopular with fans, who responded with a club record low Football League attendance of 2,949 in the next home match against Bradford City, after the directors had warned that an average crowd of 14,000 was required for the rest of the season in order to break even. In an attempt to increase crowd sizes at The Dell, the Southampton Supporters Club offered to pay admission for unemployed supporters; however, with the exception of the following week's fixture against Tottenham Hotspur, attendance exceeded 8,000 just once more during the season.

=== List of match results ===
27 August 1932 1	Millwall	3–0	Southampton	London
				Stadium: The Den; Attendance: 20,000

29 August 1932 2	Southampton	2–2	Port Vale	Southampton
	Drake			Stadium: The Dell; Attendance: 8,151

3 September 1932 3	Southampton	4–2	Manchester United	Southampton
	Brewis; Arnold			Stadium: The Dell; Attendance: 7,997

5 September 1932 4	Port Vale	0–2	Southampton	Hanley
			Drake; Coates	Stadium: Old Recreation Ground; Attendance: 8,843

10 September 1932 5	Southampton	1–0	Bury	Southampton
	Arnold			Stadium: The Dell; Attendance: 11,769

17 September 1932 6	Lincoln City	1–0	Southampton	Lincoln
				Stadium: Sincil Bank; Attendance: 12,000

24 September 1932 7	Southampton	4–3	West Ham United	Southampton
	Arnold; Drake			Stadium: The Dell; Attendance: 11,668

1 October 1932 8	Fulham	4–2	Southampton	London
			Brewis; Coates	Stadium: Craven Cottage; Attendance: 15,000

8 October 1932 9	Southampton	2–1	Chesterfield	Southampton
	Drake			Stadium: The Dell; Attendance: 9,447

15 October 1932 10	Bradford City	1–0	Southampton	Bradford
				Stadium: Valley Parade; Attendance: 17,133

22 October 1932 11	Tottenham Hotspur	5–0	Southampton	London
				Stadium: White Hart Lane; Attendance: 25,704

29 October 1932 12	Southampton	3–0	Grimsby Town	Southampton
	Drake			Stadium: The Dell; Attendance: 10,081

5 November 1932 13	Oldham Athletic	2–0	Southampton	Oldham
				Stadium: Boundary Park; Attendance: 8,000

12 November 1932 14	Southampton	1–0	Stoke City	Southampton
	Campbell			Stadium: The Dell; Attendance: 11,862

19 November 1932 15	Plymouth Argyle	1–1	Southampton	Plymouth
			Arnold	Stadium: Home Park; Attendance: 20,000

26 November 1932 16	Southampton	2–0	Bradford Park Avenue	Southampton
	Arnold			Stadium: The Dell; Attendance: 11,693

3 December 1932 17	Burnley	2–0	Southampton	Burnley
				Stadium: Turf Moor; Attendance: 7,000

10 December 1932 18	Southampton	0–2	Nottingham Forest	Southampton
				Stadium: The Dell; Attendance: 7,753

17 December 1932 19	Charlton Athletic	2–0	Southampton	London
				Stadium: The Valley; Attendance: 12,000

24 December 1932 20	Southampton	1–0	Preston North End	Southampton
	Drake			Stadium: The Dell; Attendance: 9,569

26 December 1932 21	Swansea Town	2–1	Southampton	Swansea
			Drake	Stadium: Vetch Field; Attendance: 17,791

27 December 1932 22	Southampton	2–0	Swansea Town	Southampton
	Neal; Brewis			Stadium: The Dell; Attendance: 11,862

31 December 1932 23	Southampton	2–3	Millwall	Southampton
	Keeping; Drake			Stadium: The Dell; Attendance: 9,071

7 January 1933 24	Manchester United	1–2	Southampton	Manchester
			Brewis; Arnold	Stadium: Old Trafford; Attendance: 22,000

21 January 1933 25	Bury	1–0	Southampton	Bury
				Stadium: Gigg Lane; Attendance: 9,000

28 January 1933 26	Southampton	4–0	Lincoln City	Southampton
	Arnold; Holt; Coates			Stadium: The Dell; Attendance: 7,225

4 February 1933 27	West Ham United	3–1	Southampton	London
			Holt	Stadium: Boleyn Ground; Attendance: 20,000

11 February 1933 28	Southampton	2–2	Fulham	Southampton
	Keeping; Brewis			Stadium: The Dell; Attendance: 8,586

22 February 1933 29	Chesterfield	1–0	Southampton	Chesterfield
				Stadium: Saltergate; Attendance: 5,134

25 February 1933 30	Southampton	3–1	Bradford City	Southampton
	Drake; Luckett			Stadium: The Dell; Attendance: 2,949

4 March 1933 31	Southampton	1–1	Tottenham Hotspur	Southampton
	Adams			Stadium: The Dell; Attendance: 11,806

11 March 1933 32	Grimsby Town	2–2	Southampton	Cleethorpes
			Drake; Luckett	Stadium: Blundell Park; Attendance: 5,000

18 March 1933 33	Southampton	0–2	Oldham Athletic	Southampton
				Stadium: The Dell; Attendance: 6,815

25 March 1933 34	Stoke City	3–1	Southampton	Stoke-on-Trent
			Drake	Stadium: Victoria Ground; Attendance: 18,900

1 April 1933 35	Southampton	2–0	Plymouth Argyle	Southampton
	Neal; Coates			Stadium: The Dell; Attendance: 6,649

8 April 1933 36	Bradford Park Avenue	2–1	Southampton	Bradford
			Own goal	Stadium: Park Avenue; Attendance: 8,000

14 April 1933 37	Southampton	6–2	Notts County	Southampton
	Brewis; Neal; Ruddy; Bradford; Luckett			Stadium: The Dell; Attendance: 8,108

15 April 1933 38	Southampton	3–1	Burnley	Southampton
	Luckett; Drake			Stadium: The Dell; Attendance: 7,302

17 April 1933 39	Notts County	1–2	Southampton	Nottingham
			Drake	Stadium: Meadow Lane; Attendance: 8,000

22 April 1933 40	Nottingham Forest	4–2	Southampton	West Bridgford
			Brewis; Holt	Stadium: City Ground; Attendance: 7,000

29 April 1933 41	Southampton	3–0	Charlton Athletic	Southampton
	Neal; Drake; Bradford			Stadium: The Dell; Attendance: 4,000

6 May 1933 42	Preston North End	3–1	Southampton	Preston
			Ruddy	Stadium: Deepdale; Attendance: 5,199

=== Final league table ===
Pos	Team	Pld	W	D	L	GF	GA	GAv	Pts
10	Swansea Town	42	19	4	19	50	54	0.926	42
11	Bradford City	42	14	13	15	65	61	1.066	41
12	Southampton	42	18	5	19	66	66	1.000	41
13	Grimsby Town	42	14	13	15	79	84	0.940	41
14	Plymouth Argyle	42	16	9	17	63	67	0.940	41

Rules for classification: 1) Points; 2) Goal average; 3) Goals scored

=== Results by matchday ===
Round	1	2	3	4	5	6	7	8	9	10	11	12	13	14	15	16	17	18	19	20	21	22	23	24	25	26	27	28	29	30	31	32	33	34	35	36	37	38	39	40	41	42
Ground	A	H	H	A	H	A	H	A	H	A	A	H	A	H	A	H	A	H	A	H	A	H	H	A	A	H	A	H	A	H	H	A	H	A	H	A	H	H	A	A	H	A
Result	L	D	W	W	W	L	W	L	W	L	L	W	L	W	D	W	L	L	L	W	L	W	L	W	L	W	L	D	L	W	D	D	L	L	W	L	W	W	W	L	W	L
Position	22	17	10	6	7	7	5	7	6	8	13	10	13	9	9	9	9	10	12	11	14	11	12	11	12	11	13	13	13	12	12	12	13	14	13	14	13	11	10	11	9	12

Source: 11v11.com
A = Away; H = Home; W = Win; D = Draw; L = Loss

== FA Cup ==
Southampton entered the 1932–33 FA Cup in the third round against Stoke City, who at the time were third in the Second Division league table. The visiting Saints put up a "spirited performance" against the soon-to-be league champions at the Victoria Ground, and saw a header from Ted Drake cleared off the goal line in the first half, but were defeated by a single goal three minutes into the second half. Southampton were unable to find an equaliser, and as a result were eliminated in the third round of the tournament for the fifth consecutive season – their worst run in the competition to date.

14 January 1933 Round 3	Stoke City	1–0	Southampton	Stoke-on-Trent
				Stadium: Victoria Ground; Attendance: 18,526

== Other matches ==
Outside of the league and the FA Cup, Southampton played four additional first-team matches during the 1932–33 season. The first was the semi-final of the second annual Hampshire Combination Cup against local rivals Portsmouth on 5 October, which the First Division side won 6–0 at Fratton Park. Pompey were three up by half-time thanks to a brace for Fred Worrall and a goal by centre-forward McCarthy, before Jimmy Nichol scored twice and Worrall completed his hat-trick after the break. The performance of Septimus Rutherford was praised by reporters, who described him as "a very dangerous winger". The club's first non-competitive fixture of the season was a friendly match against Third Division South side Gillingham in February, which they lost 3–1 (Arthur Holt scored for the Saints).

A second friendly followed in March, against a team representing the Tidworth Garrison, which Southampton won 3–1. The club ended their season with another match against Portsmouth on 3 May, which served as a combined fixture for the Hampshire Benevolent Cup and Rowland Hospital Cup, with both charities sharing the proceeds from the game. The Saints were on the end of another thrashing at the hands of the top-flight hosts, who won 5–0 thanks to another hat-trick from Worrall, as well as a first-half goal from Jack Weddle and a second-half own-goal by right-half Charlie Sillett.

5 October 1932 Hampshire CC Semi-Final	Portsmouth	6–0	Southampton	Portsmouth
	Worrall; McCarthy; Nichol			Stadium: Fratton Park; Attendance: 3,997

18 February 1933 Friendly	Gillingham	3–1	Southampton	Gillingham
			Holt	Stadium: Priestfield Stadium

15 March 1933 Friendly	Tidworth Garrison	1–3	Southampton	Tidworth
			Hunt; Clarke	Stadium: Tidworth Camp

3 May 1933 Hampshire BC/Rowland HC	Portsmouth	5–0	Southampton	Portsmouth
	Worrall; Weddle; Sillett (o.g.)			Stadium: Fratton Park; Attendance: 2,716

== Player details ==
Southampton used 21 different players during the 1932–33 season, twelve of whom scored during the campaign. The team played in a 2–3–5 formation throughout, using two full-backs, three half-backs, two outside forwards, two inside forwards and a centre-forward. Left-half Bill Luckett played in all 45 of the club's games during the campaign. Outside-right Dick Neal and goalkeeper Bert Scriven each appeared in all but one of the season's league games and the match for the Hampshire Benevolent and Rowland Hospital Cups. Centre-forward Ted Drake finished as the season's top scorer with 20 goals in the Second Division, followed by outside-left Johnny Arnold on eleven goals and inside-forward Tom Brewis on ten. Luckett was the highest-scoring half-back of the season on five goals, and Michael Keeping was the highest-scoring full-back on two.

=== Squad statistics ===
Name	Pos.	Nat.	League		FA Cup		Other (Note: "Other" includes the Hampshire Combination Cup and Hampshire Benevolent/Rowland Hospital Cup matches.)		Total	
Name	Pos.	Nat.	Apps.	Gls.	Apps.	Gls.	Apps.	Gls.	Apps.	Gls.
Bill Adams	HB	(England)	35	1	1	0	2	0	38	1
Arthur Bradford	HB	(England)	38	2	1	0	2	0	41	2
Tom Brewis	FW	(England)	31	10	0	0	2	0	33	10
Frank Campbell	HB	(Scotland)	30	1	1	0	1	0	32	1
Herbert Coates	FW	(England)	30	4	1	0	0	0	31	4
Ted Drake	FW	(England)	33	20	1	0	2	0	36	20
Fred Dunmore	FW	(England)	1	0	0	0	0	0	1	0
Bob Foster	GK	(England)	1	0	0	0	1	0	2	0
Jimmy Harris	FW	(England)	2	0	0	0	0	0	2	0
Arthur Holt	FW	(England)	8	3	0	0	1	0	9	3
Bill Luckett	HB	(England)	42	5	1	0	2	0	45	5
Dick Neal	FW	(England)	41	4	1	0	1	0	43	4
Frank Osborne	FW	(England)	5	0	1	0	0	0	6	0
Arthur Roberts	FB	(England)	4	0	0	0	2	0	6	0
Tom Ruddy	FW	(England)	15	2	0	0	2	0	17	2
Bert Scriven	GK	(England)	41	0	1	0	1	0	43	0
Charlie Sillett	FB	(England)	6	0	0	0	1	0	7	0
Arthur Tilford	FB	(England)	10	0	0	0	0	0	10	0
Stan Woodhouse	HB	(England)	37	0	0	0	1	0	38	0
Players with appearances who left before the end of the season
Johnny Arnold	FW	(England)	26	11	1	0	1	0	28	11
Michael Keeping	FB	(England)	26	2	1	0	0	0	27	2

=== Most appearances ===
Rank	Name	Pos.	League		FA Cup		Other		Total	
Rank	Name	Pos.	Apps.	%	Apps.	%	Apps.	%	Apps.	%
1	Bill Luckett	HB	42	100.00	1	100.00	2	100.00	45	100.00
2	Dick Neal	FW	41	97.62	1	100.00	1	50.00	43	95.56
2	Bert Scriven	GK	41	97.62	1	100.00	1	50.00	43	95.56
4	Arthur Bradford	HB	38	90.48	1	100.00	2	100.00	41	91.11
5	Stan Woodhouse	HB	37	88.10	0	0.00	1	50.00	38	84.44
5	Bill Adams	HB	35	83.33	1	100.00	2	100.00	38	84.44
7	Ted Drake	FW	33	78.57	1	100.00	2	100.00	36	80.00
8	Tom Brewis	FW	31	73.81	0	0.00	2	100.00	33	73.33
9	Frank Campbell	HB	30	71.43	1	50.00	1	50.00	32	71.11
10	Herbert Coates	FW	30	71.43	1	50.00	0	0.00	31	68.89

=== Top goalscorers ===
Rank	Name	Pos.	League		FA Cup		Other		Total	
Rank	Name	Pos.	Gls.	GPG	Gls.	GPG	Gls.	GPG	Gls.	GPG
1	Ted Drake	FW	20	0.60	0	0.00	0	0.00	20	0.55
2	Johnny Arnold	FW	11	0.42	0	0.00	0	0.00	11	0.39
3	Tom Brewis	FW	10	0.32	0	0.00	0	0.00	10	0.30
4	Bill Luckett	HB	5	0.11	0	0.00	0	0.00	5	0.11
5	Herbert Coates	FW	4	30	0	0.00	0	0.00	4	0.12
5	Dick Neal	FW	4	0.09	0	0.00	0	0.00	4	0.09
7	Arthur Holt	FW	3	0.37	0	0.00	0	0.00	3	0.33
8	Tom Ruddy	FW	2	0.13	0	0.00	0	0.00	2	0.11
8	Michael Keeping	FB	2	0.07	0	0.00	0	0.00	2	0.07
8	Arthur Bradford	HB	2	0.05	0	0.00	0	0.00	2	0.04

== Bibliography ==
- Chalk, Gary; Holley, Duncan (10 August 1987), A Complete Record of Southampton Football Club: 1885–1987, Derby, England: Breedon Books, ISBN 978-0907969228
- Chalk, Gary; Holley, Duncan; Bull, David (28 November 2013), All the Saints: A Complete Who's Who of Southampton FC, Bristol, England: Hagiology Publishing, ISBN 978-0992686406
- Juson, Dave; Aldworth, Clay; Bendel, Barry; Bull, David; Chalk, Gary (10 November 2004), Saints v Pompey: A History of Unrelenting Rivalry, Bristol, England: Hagiology Publishing, ISBN 978-0953447459
