= 1931–32 Southampton F.C. season =

English football club season

Southampton F.C.
1931–32 season
- Chairman: Sloane Stanley
- Manager: George Kay
- Stadium: The Dell
- Second Division: 14th
- FA Cup: Third round
- Top goalscorer: League: Johnny Arnold (20); All: Johnny Arnold (21)
- Highest home attendance: League: 22,353 v Chesterfield (26 December 1931); Overall: 22,927 v Sunderland (13 January 1932)
- Lowest home attendance: 6,128 v Manchester; United (7 May 1932)
- Average home league attendance: 11,003
- Biggest win: 5–1 v Port Vale (27 February 1932); 4–0 v Nottingham Forest (28 March 1932)
- Biggest defeat: 0–6 v Plymouth Argyle (5 December 1931)
Home colours

The 1931–32 season was the 37th season of competitive football by Southampton, and the club's tenth in the Second Division of the Football League. After finishing in the top half of the Second Division league table for the past three seasons, the Saints struggled to challenge in 1931–32 and ended up finishing in 14th place, closer to relegation than promotion. Southampton's first season with manager George Kay started strongly, as the team picked up four wins in their first five matches and reached the top of the Second Division league table for the first time in the club's history. Form quickly deteriorated, however, and the club was briefly involved in a fight for survival in the new year. After picking up a few more wins, Southampton secured their safety and finished in 14th place with 14 wins, 14 draws and 14 losses.

In the 1931–32 FA Cup, Southampton again travelled to Roker Park to face First Division side Sunderland in the third round. This time the Saints forced a replay at The Dell after a goalless draw, but lost 4–2 to face elimination at the first hurdle for the fifth season running. The club ended the season with the annual Rowland Hospital Cup and Hampshire Benevolent Cup matches against local rivals Portsmouth, which they drew and lost, respectively. The Saints also competed in the inaugural Hampshire Combination Cup in April, beating Portsmouth in the semi-final and losing to Bournemouth & Boscombe Athletic in the final. Southampton played another four friendly matches during the campaign, beating sides from the Royal Air Force and the Southern Command, and losing to Exeter City and a side representing the Dutch FA.

Southampton used 34 different players during the 1931–32 season and had sixteen different goalscorers. Their top scorer was outside-left Johnny Arnold, who scored 20 goals in the Second Division and one in the Hampshire Combination Cup. Arthur Haddleton scored ten goals in the competition, followed by Arthur Wilson with seven league goals. Eleven players were signed by the club during the campaign, with eight released and sold to other clubs. The average attendance at The Dell during the 1931–32 season was 11,003. The highest attendance was 22,927 against Sunderland in the FA Cup third round replay. The highest league attendance was 22,353 against Chesterfield on 26 December 1931. The lowest attendance was 6,128 against Manchester United on 7 May 1931, in the final game of the Second Division season.

== Background and transfers ==
At the end of the 1930–31 season, several players left Southampton. Scottish inside-right Jerry Mackie retired from football, having scored 24 times in 84 appearances during a three-year career with the Saints. Inside-left Laurie Cumming, who had fallen out of favour after "his temperament became suspect", joined Scottish club Alloa Athletic. Left-back Ted Hough, who had been at the club for almost ten years, signed for Southampton's local rivals Portsmouth in the First Division, who paid £200 for the player. Inside-left Ernie Warren also left the Saints for a second time, signing for Southern League side Peterborough & Fletton United. Centre-half Bill Stoddart joined Third Division South club Bristol Rovers in July, and inside-right Billy Stage left to join Great Harwood in the Lancashire Combination in August.

New Saints manager George Kay also signed three players during the summer. First was inside-right Frank Osborne from Tottenham Hotspur in June, who cost the club £450. Also brought in was amateur centre-forward Ted Drake from Winchester City, who signed a professional contract in November. In August, inside-forward Henry O'Grady joined from Port Vale in August. Later, in September, Welsh winger Frank Matson signed from Cardiff City, having previously made a guest appearance for the Saints in the 1931 Hampshire Benevolent Cup. Arthur Holt also signed from Hampshire League side Totton on amateur terms the same month, although would not turn professional until the following October. Also in September, outside-left Reg Watson was transferred to Rochdale. In October, the club signed Charlie Sillett from Barking Town, who initially filled in at centre-forward and later played in several other positions. Amateur forward Bill Charlton joined from Middlesex Wanderers in December.

During a period described by club historians as an "injury crisis", former centre-half George Harkus rejoined the club in February, alongside new Saints Supporters Club-funded outside-right Dick Neal from Derby County. With relegation to the Third Division South still a possibility, Southampton added another forward in March when they signed Tom Brewis from York City, after securing a loan from a club director due to financial difficulties. Outside-right Peter Cowper left around the same time to join Southport, having submitted a transfer request more than a year earlier. The final transfer was a trial for Witton Albion right-half Henry Belcher in April.

Players transferred in

Name	Nationality	Pos.	Club	Date	Fee	Ref.
Ted Drake	England	FW	(England) Winchester City	June 1931	Free (Note: Ted Drake initially joined on amateur terms in June 1931, before turning professional that November.)	
Frank Osborne	England	FW	(England) Tottenham Hotspur	June 1931	£450	
Henry O'Grady	England	FW	(England) Port Vale	August 1931	Unknown	
Arthur Holt	England	FW	(England) Totton	September 1931	Free (Note: Arthur Holt initially joined on amateur terms in September 1931, before turning professional in October 1932.)	
Frank Matson	Wales	FW	(Wales) Cardiff City	September 1931	Unknown	
Charlie Sillett	England	FB	(England) Barking Town	October 1931	Free (Note: Charlie Sillett initially joined on amateur terms in October 1931, before turning professional that November.)	
Bill Charlton	England	FW	(England) Middlesex Wanderers	December 1931	Free (Note: Bill Charlton joined on amateur terms.)	
George Harkus	England	HB	(England) New Milton Town	February 1932	Free (Note: George Harkus returned to Southampton in February 1932 after a temporary transfer to Olympique Lyonnais.)	
Dick Neal	England	FW	(England) Derby County	February 1932	£500	
Tom Brewis	England	FW	(England) York City	March 1932	Unknown	

Players transferred out

Name	Nationality	Pos.	Club	Date	Fee	Ref.
Laurie Cumming	Ireland	FW	(Scotland) Alloa Athletic	May 1931	Free	
Ted Hough	England	FB	(England) Portsmouth	May 1931	£200	
Ernie Warren	England	FW	(England) Peterborough & Fletton United	May 1931	Unknown	
Bill Stoddart	England	HB	(England) Bristol Rovers	July 1931	Unknown	
Billy Stage	England	FW	(England) Great Harwood	August 1931	Unknown	
Reg Watson	England	FW	(England) Rochdale	September 1931	Free	
Peter Cowper	England	FW	(England) Southport	March 1932	Unknown	

Players given trials

Name	Nationality	Pos.	Club	Start date	End date	Ref.
Henry Belcher	England	HB	(England) Witton Albion	April 1932	April 1932	

Players retired

Name	Nationality	Pos.	Date	Reason	Ref.
Jerry Mackie	Scotland	FW	May 1931	Retired due to age	

== Second Division ==
Southampton started the 1931–32 Second Division season with their strongest beginning to a campaign in the Football League to date, picking up four wins in their opening five games and reaching the top of the table for the first time in the club's history. The run started on 29 August 1931 with a 3–0 victory at home to promotion hopefuls Burnley; continued with a 3–2 win over Manchester United at Old Trafford, who had just been relegated from the First Division; included a 2–1 home defeat of Tottenham Hotspur, who had finished just three points shy of promotion the previous year; and ended in a 2–1 home win over mid-table side Bury. The stint at the top of the table was short, however, and after five more games the Saints were just hanging onto a top-ten position following defeats at the hands of promotion hopefuls Spurs, Stoke City, Wolverhampton Wanderers and Bradford Park Avenue. During the first ten games of the season, Arthur Haddleton set a new club record when he scored in eight consecutive games, which lasted until it was surpassed by Ron Davies in 1966, who scored ten consecutive matches in the club's first season in the top flight, on the way to finishing as the division's top scorer that year.

The Saints were never able to keep up a good run of results due to ongoing illness and injury problems – according to club historians, manager George Kay used a total of 30 players during the league campaign, including two goalkeepers, three right-backs, five left-backs, five right-halves, five centre-halves, two left-halves, nine outside-rights, nine inside-rights, six centre-forwards, seven inside-lefts and four outside-lefts. On 28 November the team lost 5–0 at Notts County, who had been recently promoted from the Third Division South, before suffering their biggest home league defeat the next week when they were thrashed 6–0 by Plymouth Argyle, who were fifth in the table at the time. By March the Saints were facing a battle against relegation, sitting 18th in the table just five points above the drop. However, a strong finish to the campaign saw the side pick up wins over Swansea Town, Nottingham Forest, Notts County and Plymouth Argyle, losing just once in their last eight fixtures and securing their Second Division status for another year. Southampton finished the season in 14th place with 14 wins, 14 draws and 14 losses – the same record as they had managed in 1922–23, their first season in the division.

=== List of match results ===
29 August 1931 1	Southampton	3–0	Burnley	Southampton
	Jepson; O'Grady; Haines			Stadium: The Dell; Attendance: 14,516

2 September 1931 2	Manchester United	2–3	Southampton	Manchester
			Fraser; Haddleton; Arnold	Stadium: Old Trafford; Attendance: 30,000

5 September 1931 3	Preston North End	2–1	Southampton	Preston
			Haddleton	Stadium: Deepdale; Attendance: 16,000

7 September 1931 4	Southampton	2–1	Tottenham Hotspur	Southampton
	Keeping; Haddleton			Stadium: The Dell; Attendance: 13,800

12 September 1931 5	Southampton	2–1	Bury	Southampton
	Haddleton; Arnold			Stadium: The Dell; Attendance: 15,011

14 September 1931 6	Tottenham Hotspur	5–2	Southampton	London
			Haddleton }	Stadium: White Hart Lane; Attendance: 25,000

19 September 1931 7	Southampton	1–2	Stoke City	Southampton
	Haddleton			Stadium: The Dell; Attendance: 14,671

26 September 1931 8	Charlton Athletic	2–3	Southampton	London
			Fraser; Haddleton; Arnold	Stadium: The Valley; Attendance: 12,000

3 October 1931 9	Southampton	1–3	Wolverhampton Wanderers	Southampton
	Haddleton			Stadium: The Dell; Attendance: 16,622

10 October 1931 10	Bradford Park Avenue	2–1	Southampton	Bradford
			Arnold	Stadium: Park Avenue; Attendance: 14,000

17 October 1931 11	Port Vale	0–0	Southampton	Hanley
				Stadium: Old Recreation Ground; Attendance: 5,000

24 October 1931 12	Southampton	0–3	Millwall	Southampton
	Arnold; Jepson			Stadium: The Dell; Attendance: 11,141

31 October 1931 13	Bradford City	5–2	Southampton	Bradford
			Haddleton; Arnold	Stadium: Valley Parade; Attendance: 15,000

7 November 1931 14	Southampton	1–1	Oldham Athletic	Southampton
	Arnold			Stadium: The Dell; Attendance: 10,784

14 November 1931 15	Swansea Town	3–4	Southampton	Swansea
			Wilson; Fraser; Arnold	Stadium: Vetch Field; Attendance: 3,000

21 November 1931 16	Southampton	2–0	Barnsley	Southampton
	Campbell; Arnold			Stadium: The Dell; Attendance: 11,991

28 November 1931 17	Notts County	5–0	Southampton	Nottingham
				Stadium: Meadow Lane; Attendance: 11,000

5 December 1931 18	Southampton	6–0	Plymouth Argyle	Southampton
				Stadium: The Dell; Attendance: 12,723

12 December 1931 19	Bristol City	0–1	Southampton	Bristol
			Wilson	Stadium: Ashton Gate Stadium; Attendance: 5,000

19 December 1931 20	Southampton	2–1	Leeds United	Southampton
	Keeping; Luckett			Stadium: The Dell; Attendance: 11,923

25 December 1931 21	Chesterfield	1–0	Southampton	Chesterfield
				Stadium: Saltergate; Attendance: 14,508

26 December 1931 22	Southampton	1–2	Chesterfield	Southampton
	Arnold			Stadium: The Dell; Attendance: 22,353

2 January 1932 23	Burnley	1–3	Southampton	Burnley
			Sillett; Arnold	Stadium: Turf Moor; Attendance: 2,000

16 January 1932 24	Southampton	3–3	Preston North End	Southampton
	Jepson; O'Grady; Arnold			Stadium: The Dell; Attendance: 8,050

30 January 1932 25	Stoke City	2–0	Southampton	Stoke-on-Trent
				Stadium: Victoria Ground; Attendance: 11,000

3 February 1932 26	Bury	3–0	Southampton	Bury
				Stadium: Gigg Lane; Attendance: 4,000

6 February 1932 27	Southampton	1–1	Charlton Athletic	Southampton
	Fraser			Stadium: The Dell; Attendance: 6,439

13 February 1932 28	Wolverhampton Wanderers	5–1	Southampton	Wolverhampton
			Charlton	Stadium: Molineux Stadium; Attendance: 15,000

20 February 1932 29	Southampton	0–3	Bradford Park Avenue	Southampton
				Stadium: The Dell; Attendance: 8,013

27 February 1932 30	Southampton	5–1	Port Vale	Southampton
	McIlwaine; Arnold; Sillett			Stadium: The Dell; Attendance: 7,113

5 March 1932 31	Millwall	0–1	Southampton	London
			Sillett	Stadium: The Den; Attendance: 18,000

12 March 1932 32	Southampton	0–1	Bradford City	Southampton
				Stadium: The Dell; Attendance: 8,361

19 March 1932 33	Oldham Athletic	2–0	Southampton	Oldham
				Stadium: Boundary Park; Attendance: 5,000

25 March 1932 34	Nottingham Forest	2–0	Southampton	West Bridgford
				Stadium: City Ground; Attendance: 11,639

26 March 1932 35	Southampton	3–0	Swansea Town	Southampton
	Wilson; Arnold			Stadium: The Dell; Attendance: 6,375

28 March 1932 36	Southampton	4–0	Nottingham Forest	Southampton
	Wilson; Drake; Arnold			Stadium: The Dell; Attendance: 11,409

2 April 1932 37	Barnsley	3–3	Southampton	Barnsley
			Neal; Drake; Arnold	Stadium: Oakwell; Attendance: 5,000

9 April 1932 38	Southampton	3–1	Notts County	Southampton
	Drake; Arnold			Stadium: The Dell; Attendance: 7,332

16 April 1932 39	Plymouth Argyle	1–2	Southampton	Plymouth
			Neal; Arnold	Stadium: Home Park; Attendance: 12,000

23 April 1932 40	Southampton	1–1	Bristol City	Southampton
	Drake			Stadium: The Dell; Attendance: 6,322

30 April 1932 41	Leeds United	1–0	Southampton	Leeds
				Stadium: Elland Road; Attendance: 15,000

7 May 1932 42	Southampton	1–1	Manchester United	Southampton
	Neal			Stadium: The Dell; Attendance: 6,128

=== Final league table ===
Pos	Team	Pld	W	D	L	GF	GA	GAv	Pts
12	Manchester United	42	17	8	17	71	72	0.986	42
13	Preston North End	42	16	10	16	75	77	0.974	42
14	Southampton	42	17	7	18	66	77	0.857	41
15	Swansea Town	42	16	7	19	73	75	0.973	39
16	Notts County	42	13	12	17	75	75	1.000	38

Rules for classification: 1) Points; 2) Goal average; 3) Goals scored

=== Results by matchday ===
Round	1	2	3	4	5	6	7	8	9	10	11	12	13	14	15	16	17	18	19	20	21	22	23	24	25	26	27	28	29	30	31	32	33	34	35	36	37	38	39	40	41	42
Ground	H	A	A	H	H	A	H	A	H	A	A	H	A	H	A	H	A	H	A	H	A	H	A	H	A	A	H	A	H	H	A	H	A	A	H	H	A	H	A	H	A	H
Result	W	W	L	W	W	L	L	W	L	L	D	W	L	D	W	W	L	L	W	W	L	L	W	D	L	L	D	L	L	W	W	L	L	L	W	W	D	W	W	D	L	D
Position	1	2	5	2	1	3	8	7	7	10	10	9	11	12	10	7	9	10	8	8	9	9	9	8	12	12	12	14	14	13	11	15	16	18	16	13	13	12	11	12	14	14

Source: 11v11.com
A = Away; H = Home; W = Win; D = Draw; L = Loss

== FA Cup ==
Southampton entered the 1931–32 FA Cup in the third round against First Division side Sunderland, who had knocked them out at the same stage the previous season. The match took place at Roker Park on 9 January and ended as a goalless draw, with club historians highlighting the defensive performances of goalkeeper Bert Scriven, right-back Bill Adams and centre-half Arthur Bradford, while suggesting that "Had Charlie Sillett made the most of his opportunities then there would have been no need for a replay". In the replay at The Dell four days later, the top-flight visitors quickly asserted their dominance in the first half with three goals against the "sluggish" hosts. The Saints reacted in the second half, with goals from Sillett and Michael Keeping giving the Second Division side a chance of a comeback, however a "glorious opportunity" missed by Johnny Arnold and a penalty for Sunderland later on sent Southampton out of the tournament in the third round for the fifth consecutive season.

9 January 1932 Round 3	Sunderland	0–0	Southampton	Sunderland
				Stadium: Roker Park; Attendance: 28,931

13 January 1932 Round 3 Replay	Southampton	2–4	Sunderland	Southampton
	Sillett; Keeping			Stadium: The Dell; Attendance: 22,927

== Other matches ==
Outside of the league and the FA Cup, Southampton played eight additional first-team matches during the 1931–32 season. The first was a friendly match against a Royal Air Force side at The Dell in November, which the Saints won 4–0 thanks to a brace from Frank Matson and goals from Peter Dougall and Arthur Holt. A second friendly in January against Third Division South club Exeter City ended in a 2–0 loss, which was followed in March by a 6–1 thrashing at the hands of a team representing the Dutch FA in Rotterdam (the only goal for the visitors scored by Arthur Wilson). A final friendly, at a side representing the Southern Command, took place in April and ended in a 3–1 win for Southampton, thanks to goals from Johnny Arnold, Tom Brewis and Ted Drake.

Five days after the final friendly, Southampton hosted local rivals Portsmouth in the inaugural Hampshire Combination Cup, which also featured Third Division South sides Aldershot and Bournemouth & Boscombe Athletic. The Second Division hosts beat their top-flight visitors by a single goal, which was scored by Arnold in the 67th minute after Pompey goalkeeper Jock Gilfillan saved a shot from Matson. Portsmouth's Alec Mackie was involved in two incidents during the game, first committing a foul on Arnold in the first-half which led to the referee introducing a police officer on standby, and later being sent off following an "unfortunate incident". In the final at The Dell, the Saints lost 3–2 to Bournemouth & Boscombe Athletic despite a strike from Drake and an own goal.

Southampton and Portsmouth met again on 9 May in the Rowland Hospital Cup, the first of their annual end-of-season charity cup matches. Saints regulars Drake, Arnold and Frank Campbell were injured, leading manager George Kay to give official debuts to Holt at centre-forward and Henry Belcher at right-half. Dick Neal gave the hosts the lead before Jimmy Easson equalised for the visitors, and later Holt's first official goal was cancelled out by another leveller from Fred Worrall. Two days later, the sides met for the third time in a month at Fratton Park for the Hampshire Benevolent Cup. The hosts thrashed the Saints 5–1, with the visitors once again playing with alumni George Harkus and Bill Rawlings in the absence of a full squad. Southampton went ahead after just four minutes, when Neal headed in a cross from Bill Luckett after a move started by Rawlings, but were quickly dominated by Pompey who scored through Frederick Cook, Jack Weddle, Worrall and Easson (twice).

18 November 1931 Friendly	Southampton	4–0	Royal Air Force	Southampton
	Matson; Dougall; Holt			Stadium: The Dell

23 January 1932 Friendly	Exeter City	2–0	Southampton	Exeter
				Stadium: St James Park

9 March 1932 Friendly	Dutch FA	6–1	Southampton	Rotterdam
			Wilson

13 April 1932 Friendly	Southern Command	1–3	Southampton	Tidworth
			Arnold; Brewis; Drake	Stadium: Tidworth Camp

18 April 1932 Hampshire CC Semi-Final	Southampton	1–0	Portsmouth	Southampton
	Arnold 67'			Stadium: The Dell; Attendance: 2,337

27 April 1932 Hampshire CC Final	Southampton	2–3	Bournemouth & Boscombe Athletic	Southampton
	Drake; Own goal			Stadium: The Dell

9 May 1932 Rowland Hospital Cup	Southampton	2–2	Portsmouth	Southampton
	Neal; Holt		Easson 30'; Worrall	Stadium: The Dell; Attendance: 612; Referee: R. Rudd

11 May 1932 Hampshire BC	Portsmouth	5–1	Southampton	Portsmouth
	Cook 20'; Weddle 23'; Worrall; Easson		Neal 4'	Stadium: Fratton Park; Referee: SQMS Gouge

== Player details ==
Southampton used 34 different players during the 1931–32 season, 16 of whom scored during the campaign. The team played in a 2–3–5 formation throughout, using two full-backs, three half-backs, two outside forwards, two inside forwards and a centre-forward. Club captain Bill Adams made the most appearances for the club during the campaign, playing in every match of the season except the Hampshire Benevolent Cup. Left-half Bill Luckett appeared in all but four league games, and outside-left Johnny Arnold featured in all but five league fixtures, the Hampshire Benevolent Cup and the Rowland Hospital Cup. Arnold finished as the season's top scorer with 20 goals in the Second Division and one in the Hampshire Combination Cup, followed by Arthur Haddleton on ten league goals and Arthur Wilson, who scored seven in the competition. Johnny McIlwaine was the highest-scoring half-back of the season with two goals, while full-backs Charlie Sillett and Michael Keeping scored five and three goals, respectively.

=== Squad statistics ===
Name	Pos.	Nat.	League		FA Cup		Other (Note: "Other" includes the Hampshire Combination Cup, Rowland Hospital Cup and Hampshire Benevolent Cup matches.)		Total	
Name	Pos.	Nat.	Apps.	Gls.	Apps.	Gls.	Apps.	Gls.	Apps.	Gls.
Bill Adams	HB	(England)	42	0	2	0	3	0	47	0
Johnny Arnold	FW	(England)	37	20	2	0	2	1	41	21
Henry Belcher	HB	(England)	0	0	0	0	2	0	2	0
Arthur Bradford	HB	(England)	25	0	2	0	2	0	29	0
Tom Brewis	FW	(England)	6	0	0	0	4	0	10	0
Frank Campbell	HB	(Scotland)	23	1	0	0	2	0	25	1
Bill Charlton	FW	(England)	2	1	0	0	0	0	2	1
Herbert Coates	FW	(England)	10	0	0	0	2	0	12	0
Peter Dougall	FW	(Scotland)	3	0	0	0	0	0	3	0
Ted Drake	FW	(England)	11	5	0	0	2	1	13	6
Bill Fraser	FW	(England)	24	4	0	0	0	0	24	4
Arthur Haddleton	FW	(England)	16	10	0	0	0	0	16	10
Willie Haines	FW	(England)	3	1	0	0	0	0	3	1
George Harkus	HB	(England)	2	0	0	0	0	0	2	0
Arthur Holt	FW	(England)	0	0	0	0	1	1	1	1
Bert Jepson	FW	(England)	21	3	2	0	0	0	23	3
Michael Keeping	FB	(England)	17	2	2	1	0	0	19	3
Bill Luckett	HB	(England)	38	1	2	0	4	0	44	1
Frank Matson	FW	(Wales)	2	0	0	0	2	0	4	0
Johnny McIlwaine	HB	(Scotland)	20	2	0	0	0	0	20	2
Dick Neal	FW	(England)	14	3	0	0	2	2	16	5
Henry O'Grady	FW	(England)	7	2	0	0	0	0	7	2
Frank Osborne	FW	(England)	12	0	2	0	0	0	14	0
Arthur Roberts	FB	(England)	5	0	0	0	0	0	5	0
Bert Scriven	GK	(England)	34	0	2	0	4	0	40	0
Bert Shelley	HB	(England)	18	0	2	0	0	0	20	0
Charlie Sillett	FB	(England)	14	4	2	1	4	0	20	5
Reg Thomas	FB	(England)	8	0	0	0	1	0	9	0
Willie White	GK	(Scotland)	8	0	0	0	0	0	8	0
Arthur Wilson	HB	(England)	25	7	2	0	2	0	29	7
Stan Woodhouse	HB	(England)	14	0	0	0	3	0	17	0
Players with appearances who left before the end of the season
Peter Cowper	FW	(England)	1	0	0	0	0	0	1	0
Players who appeared for the club as guests
George Harkus	HB	(England)	0	0	0	0	1	0	1	0
Bill Rawlings	FW	(England)	0	0	0	0	1	0	1	0

=== Most appearances ===
Rank	Name	Pos.	League		FA Cup		Other		Total	
Rank	Name	Pos.	Apps.	%	Apps.	%	Apps.	%	Apps.	%
1	Bill Adams	HB	42	100.00	2	100.00	3	75.00	47	97.92
2	Bill Luckett	HB	38	90.48	2	100.00	4	100.00	44	91.67
3	Johnny Arnold	FW	37	88.10	2	100.00	2	50.00	41	85.42
4	Bert Scriven	GK	34	80.95	2	100.00	4	100.00	40	83.33
5	Arthur Bradford	HB	25	59.52	2	100.00	2	50.00	29	60.42
5	Arthur Wilson	HB	25	59.52	2	100.00	2	50.00	29	60.42
7	Frank Campbell	HB	23	54.76	0	0.00	2	50.00	25	52.08
8	Bill Fraser	FW	24	57.14	0	0.00	0	0.00	24	50.00
9	Bert Jepson	FW	21	50.00	2	100.00	0	0.00	23	47.92
10	Johnny McIlwaine	HB	20	47.62	0	0.00	0	0.00	20	41.67
10	Bert Shelley	HB	18	42.86	2	100.00	0	0.00	20	41.67
10	Charlie Sillett	FB	14	33.33	2	100.00	4	100.00	20	41.67

=== Top goalscorers ===
Rank	Name	Pos.	League		FA Cup		Other		Total	
Rank	Name	Pos.	Gls.	GPG	Gls.	GPG	Gls.	GPG	Gls.	GPG
1	Johnny Arnold	FW	20	0.54	0	0.00	1	0.50	21	0.51
2	Arthur Haddleton	FW	10	0.62	0	0.00	0	0.00	10	0.62
3	Arthur Wilson	HB	7	0.28	0	0.00	0	0.00	7	0.24
4	Ted Drake	FW	5	0.45	0	0.00	1	0.50	6	0.46
5	Dick Neal	FW	3	0.21	0	0.00	2	1.00	5	0.31
5	Charlie Sillett	FB	4	0.28	1	0.50	0	0.00	5	0.25
7	Bill Fraser	FW	4	0.16	0	0.00	0	0.00	4	0.16
8	Michael Keeping	FB	2	0.11	1	0.50	0	0.00	3	0.15
8	Bert Jepson	FW	3	0.14	0	0.00	0	0.00	3	0.13
10	Henry O'Grady	FW	2	0.28	0	0.00	0	0.00	2	0.28
10	Johnny McIlwaine	HB	2	0.10	0	0.00	0	0.00	2	0.10

== Bibliography ==
- Chalk, Gary; Holley, Duncan (10 August 1987), A Complete Record of Southampton Football Club: 1885–1987, Derby, England: Breedon Books, ISBN 978-0907969228
- Chalk, Gary; Holley, Duncan; Bull, David (28 November 2013), All the Saints: A Complete Who's Who of Southampton FC, Bristol, England: Hagiology Publishing, ISBN 978-0992686406
- Juson, Dave; Aldworth, Clay; Bendel, Barry; Bull, David; Chalk, Gary (10 November 2004), Saints v Pompey: A History of Unrelenting Rivalry, Bristol, England: Hagiology Publishing, ISBN 978-0953447459
