= 1930–31 Southampton F.C. season =

English football club season

Southampton F.C.
1930–31 season
- Chairman: Sloane Stanley
- Manager: Arthur Chadwick (until 16 April 1931)
- Stadium: The Dell
- Second Division: 9th
- FA Cup: Third round
- Top goalscorer: League: Willie Haines (15); All: Willie Haines (15)
- Highest home attendance: 23,156 v Tottenham Hotspur (26 December 1930)
- Lowest home attendance: 8,785 v Charlton Athletic (28 March 1931)
- Average home league attendance: 12,371
- Biggest win: 5–0 v Bury (13 December 1930)
- Biggest defeat: 0–5 v Preston North End (30 August 1930)
Home colours

The 1930–31 season was the 36th season of competitive football by Southampton, and the club's ninth in the Second Division of the Football League. After securing their place as a top-half side in the Second Division over the past two seasons, the Saints began to lose their footing on the league and dropped to ninth in the division. The club failed to win any of their first four games of the campaign, briefly struggling to stay above the two relegation places, but had soon made their way to the top half of the division where they remained for the rest of the season. The Saints were unable to challenge for promotion to the First Division, however, briefly reaching the top five but remaining a long way off the top two sides. Southampton finished the season in ninth place in the table with 19 wins, six draws and 17 losses.

In the 1930–31 FA Cup, Southampton travelled to face First Division side Sunderland in the third round in January. The top-flight hosts beat the Saints convincingly 2–0, with the Second Division side dropping out of the tournament after just one game for the fourth season in a row (the second time in their history they had done so). Prior to the start of the campaign, Southampton completed a pre-season tour of Denmark from May to June which included games against Odense BK, AGF Aarhus, Aalborg BK (all of which they won) and Horsens fS (which they lost). They played just one more friendly match during the season, a 3–3 draw with Bournemouth & Boscombe Athletic in March 1931. The club ended the season with two games against Portsmouth, for the Rowland Hospital Cup and the Hampshire Benevolent Cup.

Southampton used 36 different players during the 1930–31 season and had fifteen different goalscorers. Their top-scorer was centre-forward Willie Haines, who scored 15 goals in 21 appearances in the Second Division, all in the second half of the season. Johnny Arnold scored eight goals in the league, followed by Herbert Coates, Bill Fraser, Bert Jepson and Johnny McIlwaine, all on seven goals. Ten players were signed by the club during the campaign, with six released and sold to other clubs. The average attendance at The Dell during the 1930–31 season was 12,371. The highest attendance was 23,156 against Tottenham Hotspur on 26 December 1930. The lowest was 8,785 against Charlton Athletic on 28 March 1931. The season was the club's last to feature manager Arthur Chadwick, who left in April.

== Background and transfers ==
After the conclusion of the 1929–30 season, outside-left Stan Cribb joined First Division side West Ham United, having lost his place in the team to Johnny Arnold. Recently signed Scottish centre-half Alex Sharp also left the club, returning to his native country with Tranent Juniors. George Harkus left later in the summer, briefly joining French side Olympique Lyonnais. Southampton manager Arthur Chadwick brought in several players during the pre-season period. Most significant of the additions was Portsmouth captain Johnny McIlwaine, who signed in June for a club record fee of £2,650. Around the same time, the club also signed outside-forward Peter Cowper from Third Division North side New Brighton and inside-forward Laurie Cumming from divisional rivals Oldham Athletic. Billy Stage joined from Burnley in July. Just before the season started, goalkeeper George Thompson and forward Bobby Weale also left the club – the former joined Dinnington Miners' Welfare, while the latter signed for Cardiff City.

Transfer activity continued throughout the 1930–31 season. In September, the club signed full-back Reg Thomas on amateur terms from Western League side Weymouth (he turned professional in December). Horden Colliery Welfare centre-forward Arthur Haddleton signed the following month, when Thomas Groves left after his contract was cancelled. In November, amateur forward Sid Grover was signed from local Hampshire League side Romsey Town. In the new year, several more players were signed by Southampton. Romsey Town inside-forward Fred Allan and Cowes Sports winger Chris Crossley signed on amateur terms in March, and the following month goalkeeper Bill Soffe was brought in from Totton, another Hampshire League club. Grover, Allan, Crossley and Soffe were all rushed into the first-team for the penultimate game of the season against Portsmouth in May, having only made appearances for the reserves thus far, after 15 Southampton players refused to sign new contracts.

Players transferred in

Name	Nationality	Pos.	Club	Date	Fee	Ref.
Peter Cowper	England	FW	(England) New Brighton	June 1930	Unknown	
Laurie Cumming	Ireland	FW	(England) Oldham Athletic	June 1930	£500	
Johnny McIlwaine	Scotland	HB	(England) Portsmouth	June 1930	£2,650	
Billy Stage	England	FW	(England) Burnley	July 1930	Unknown	
Reg Thomas	England	FB	(England) Weymouth	September 1930	Free (Note: Reg Thomas initially joined on amateur terms in September 1930, before turning professional that December.)	
Arthur Haddleton	England	FW	(England) Horden Colliery Welfare	October 1930	Unknown	
Sid Grover	England	FW	(England) Romsey Town	November 1930	Free (Note: Sid Grover initially joined on amateur terms in November 1930, before turning professional in May 1931.)	
Fred Allan	England	FW	(England) Romsey Town	March 1931	Free (Note: Fred Allan initially joined on amateur terms.)	
Chris Crossley	England	FW	(England) Cowes	March 1931	Free (Note: Chris Crossley initially joined on amateur terms.)	
Bill Soffe	England	GK	(England) Totton	April 1931	Unknown	

Players transferred out

Name	Nationality	Pos.	Club	Date	Fee	Ref.
Stan Cribb	England	FW	(England) West Ham United	May 1930	Unknown	
Alex Sharp	Scotland	HB	(Scotland) Tranent Juniors	May 1930	Unknown	
George Harkus	England	HB	(France) Olympique Lyonnais	June 1930	Free (Note: George Harkus was temporarily transferred out to Olympique Lyonnais, before returning to Southampton in February 1932.)	
Bobby Weale	Wales	FW	(Wales) Cardiff City	August 1930	Unknown	

Players released

Name	Nationality	Pos.	Date	Subsequent club	Ref.
George Thompson	England	GK	August 1930	(England) Dinnington Miners' Welfare	

Players retired

Name	Nationality	Pos.	Date	Reason	Ref.
Thomas Groves	England	FW	October 1930	Unknown	

== Second Division ==
Southampton began the 1930–31 Second Division season on 30 August 1930 with a 5–0 loss at Preston North End, which sent the club straight to the bottom of the league table. Draws at home to Nottingham Forest and Burnley were followed by another away defeat against Oldham Athletic, leaving the Saints firmly in the battle against relegation. The club's fortunes quickly turned around, however, as they embarked on an eight-match unbeaten run which included five wins to help them move up to the top seven of the table. Much of the rest of the calendar year was spent alternating between winning and losing, during which time the team remained in the middle of the table. In November and December the club picked up wins over promotion hopefuls such as Tottenham Hotspur and Preston North End, while dropping points to strugglers like Cardiff City and Bristol City. They remained in the top eight of the Second Division table by the end of December, still in with a chance of reaching promotion.

The pattern of Southampton's season continued throughout the early months of 1931, as the team won against a host of lower-placed sides and lost against those in the higher level of the table. After drawing 3–3 with Plymouth Argyle on 17 January, the Saints did not draw again for the rest of the season, contributing to a club record 27 games without sharing points which extended into the early stages of the following season. After returning to the side in late December, centre-forward Willie Haines took over from Herbert Coates as the season's top scorer when he scored 15 goals in the last 20 games of the league, including three consecutive matches in which he scored twice in January. With Southampton safe in the top half of the table, manager Arthur Chadwick departed from the club on 16 April 1931 and retired from management, following a 23-year career. The club finished in seventh place with 19 wins, six draws and 17 losses, ten points behind West Bromwich Albion in the first promotion place.

=== List of match results ===
30 August 1930 1	Preston North End	5–0	Southampton	Preston
				Stadium: Deepdale; Attendance: 10,000

1 September 1930 2	Southampton	0–0	Nottingham Forest	Southampton
				Stadium: The Dell; Attendance: 12,000

6 September 1930 3	Southampton	1–1	Burnley	Southampton
	Jepson			Stadium: The Dell; Attendance: 13,485

8 September 1930 4	Oldham Athletic	2–1	Southampton	Oldham
			Cumming	Stadium: Boundary Park; Attendance: 13,689

13 September 1930 5	Plymouth Argyle	2–3	Southampton	Plymouth
			Cumming; Wilson	Stadium: Home Park; Attendance: 25,000

15 September 1930 6	Southampton	1–0	Oldham Athletic	Southampton
	Wilson			Stadium: The Dell; Attendance: 9,858

20 September 1930 7	Reading	1–1	Southampton	Reading
			Jepson	Stadium: Elm Park; Attendance: 8,000

27 September 1930 8	Southampton	2–0	Wolverhampton Wanderers	Southampton
	Fraser			Stadium: The Dell; Attendance: 13,552

4 October 1930 9	Bradford Park Avenue	1–1	Southampton	Bradford
			Coates	Stadium: Park Avenue; Attendance: 10,000

11 October 1930 10	Southampton	2–1	Stoke City	Southampton
	Cumming; Coates			Stadium: The Dell; Attendance: 14,772

18 October 1930 11	Southampton	1–1	West Bromwich Albion	Southampton
	Fraser			Stadium: The Dell; Attendance: 16,931

25 October 1930 12	Swansea Town	0–1	Southampton	Swansea
			Fraser	Stadium: Vetch Field; Attendance: 10,000

1 November 1930 13	Southampton	0–1	Cardiff City	Southampton
				Stadium: The Dell; Attendance: 12,202

8 November 1930 14	Bristol City	2–1	Southampton	Bristol
			Jepson	Stadium: Ashton Gate Stadium; Attendance: 15,000

15 November 1930 15	Southampton	4–1	Bradford City	Southampton
	Fraser; Arnold			Stadium: The Dell; Attendance: 10,356

22 November 1930 16	Charlton Athletic	3–1	Southampton	London
			Stage	Stadium: The Valley; Attendance: 5,000

29 November 1930 17	Southampton	4–0	Barnsley	Southampton
	McIlwaine; Jepson; Coates			Stadium: The Dell; Attendance: 11,751

6 December 1930 18	Port Vale	1–0	Southampton	Hanley
				Stadium: Old Recreation Ground; Attendance: 8,000

13 December 1930 19	Southampton	5–0	Bury	Southampton
	Coates; Arnold; McIlwaine			Stadium: The Dell; Attendance: 12,889

20 December 1930 20	Everton	2–1	Southampton	Liverpool
			Wilson	Stadium: Goodison Park; Attendance: 20,000

25 December 1930 21	Tottenham Hotspur	1–3	Southampton	London
			McIlwaine; Coates	Stadium: White Hart Lane; Attendance: 37,000

26 December 1930 22	Southampton	0–3	Tottenham Hotspur	Southampton
				Stadium: The Dell; Attendance: 23,156

27 December 1930 23	Southampton	2–1	Preston North End	Southampton
	McIlwaine; Haines			Stadium: The Dell; Attendance: 11,707

3 January 1931 24	Burnley	3–2	Southampton	Burnley
			Haines	Stadium: Turf Moor; Attendance: 10,000

17 January 1931 25	Southampton	3–3	Plymouth Argyle	Southampton
	Haines; Coates			Stadium: The Dell; Attendance: 14,013

24 January 1931 26	Southampton	3–2	Reading	Southampton
	Haines; Arnold			Stadium: The Dell; Attendance: 10,446

31 January 1931 27	Wolverhampton Wanderers	3–2	Southampton	Wolverhampton
			Mackie; Arnold	Stadium: Molineux Stadium; Attendance: 9,000

7 February 1931 28	Southampton	2–3	Bradford Park Avenue	Southampton
	Mackie; Haines			Stadium: The Dell; Attendance: 11,212

14 February 1931 29	Stoke City	1–3	Southampton	Stoke-on-Trent
			Haines; Mackie	Stadium: Victoria Ground; Attendance: 10,000

21 February 1931 30	West Bromwich Albion	1–2	Southampton	West Bromwich
			Dougall; Own goal	Stadium: The Hawthorns; Attendance: 18,000

28 February 1931 31	Southampton	1–2	Swansea Town	Southampton
	Arnold			Stadium: The Dell; Attendance: 11,041

7 March 1931 32	Cardiff City	0–1	Southampton	Cardiff
			Jepson	Stadium: Ninian Park; Attendance: 5,000

14 March 1931 33	Southampton	5–1	Bristol City	Southampton
	Mackie; Haines; Jepson			Stadium: The Dell; Attendance: 10,473

21 March 1931 34	Bradford City	4–3	Southampton	Bradford
			Dougall; Arnold	Stadium: Valley Parade; Attendance: 12,000

28 March 1931 35	Southampton	3–0	Charlton Athletic	Southampton
	Haines; Jepson; Own goal			Stadium: The Dell; Attendance: 8,785

3 April 1931 36	Millwall	1–0	Southampton	London
				Stadium: The Den; Attendance: 18,000

4 April 1931 37	Barnsley	3–1	Southampton	Barnsley
			Jepson	Stadium: Oakwell; Attendance: 7,000

6 April 1931 38	Southampton	3–1	Millwall	Southampton
	Keeping; McIlwaine; Fraser			Stadium: The Dell; Attendance: 12,137

11 April 1931 39	Southampton	2–0	Port Vale	Southampton
	Haines; Dougall			Stadium: The Dell; Attendance: 9,487

18 April 1931 40	Bury	1–0	Southampton	Bury
				Stadium: Gigg Lane; Attendance: 15,000

25 April 1931 41	Southampton	2–1	Everton	Southampton
	Wilson		Dean	Stadium: The Dell; Attendance: 9,553

2 May 1931 42	Nottingham Forest	3–1	Southampton	West Bridgford
			Haines	Stadium: City Ground; Attendance: 6,000

=== Final league table ===
Pos	Team	Pld	W	D	L	GF	GA	GAv	Pts
7	Preston North End	42	17	11	14	83	64	1.297	45
8	Burnley	42	17	11	14	81	77	1.052	45
9	Southampton	42	19	6	17	74	62	1.194	44
10	Bradford City	42	17	10	15	61	63	0.968	44
11	Stoke City	42	17	10	15	64	71	0.901	44

Rules for classification: 1) Points; 2) Goal average; 3) Goals scored

=== Results by matchday ===
Round	1	2	3	4	5	6	7	8	9	10	11	12	13	14	15	16	17	18	19	20	21	22	23	24	25	26	27	28	29	30	31	32	33	34	35	36	37	38	39	40	41	42
Ground	A	H	H	A	A	H	A	H	A	H	H	A	H	A	H	A	H	A	H	A	A	H	H	A	H	H	A	H	A	A	H	A	H	A	H	A	A	H	H	A	H	A
Result	L	D	D	L	W	W	D	W	D	W	D	W	L	L	W	L	W	L	W	L	W	L	W	L	D	W	L	L	W	W	L	W	W	L	W	L	L	W	W	L	W	L
Position	22	15	16	18	16	9	12	10	9	8	8	7	8	10	10	10	10	11	10	11	8	10	8	10	10	9	10	11	9	8	9	8	7	7	5	7	9	7	7	10	7	9

Source: 11v11.com
A = Away; H = Home; W = Win; D = Draw; L = Loss

== FA Cup ==
Southampton entered the 1930–31 FA Cup in the third round, travelling north to face First Division side Sunderland on 10 January 1931 in the first competitive meeting between the two clubs. Club historians described the hosts as "by far the better side", with the Saints going a goal down within ten minutes of the start of the game before being eliminated with a second goal later on. The team were weak in both defence and attack, with the performances of Bert Shelley and Johnny McIlwaine (playing at centre-forward in place of Willie Haines, who was absent due to illness) singled out by club historians as particularly poor.

10 January 1931 Round 3	Sunderland	2–0	Southampton	Sunderland
				Stadium: Roker Park; Attendance: 28,931

== Other matches ==
Outside of the league and the FA Cup, Southampton played seven additional first-team matches during the 1930–31 season. Shortly after the previous season's Hampshire Benevolent Cup and Rowland Hospital Cup games against Portsmouth, the club conducted a close season tour of Denmark in which they played four matches against local Danish league teams. The Saints won three of these games, beating Odense BK 3–0 on 25 May, AGF Aarhus 4–0 on 29 May and Aalborg BK 3–1 on 1 June, before losing 4–3 to Horsens fS on 5 June. The only other friendly match the club played during the season was against local Third Division South side Bournemouth & Boscombe Athletic on 25 March 1931 at Dean Court. The game ended in a 3–3 draw, with Willie Haines scoring a hat-trick for the visiting Saints.

Prior to the club's penultimate game of the season, at home to Portsmouth in the Hampshire Benevolent Cup, 15 Southampton players had turned down new contracts from the club and refused to play again. As a result, the club had to field a team including a number of reserves and former players who had agreed to step in as guests, including wing-half Len Butt, centre-forward Bill Rawlings and inside-forward Arthur Dominy. Organised by Hampshire FA secretary G. J. Eden, the makeshift side lost 4–0 to Portsmouth at The Dell, with goals scored by Jack Weddle, Jimmy Easson and Septimus Rutherford (two). The Rowland Hospital Cup game two days later featured a team consisting mainly of reserve players, with Fred Allan and Arthur Haddleton scoring for the Saints in the 2–2 draw at Fratton Park.

25 May 1930 Friendly	Odense BK	0–3	Southampton	Odense

29 May 1930 Friendly	AGF Aarhus	0–4	Southampton	Aarhus
				Stadium: Aarhus Idrætspark

1 June 1930 Friendly	Aalborg BK	1–3	Southampton	Aalborg
				Stadium: Aalborg Stadium

5 June 1930 Friendly	Horsens fS	4–3	Southampton	Horsens
			Fraser; Dougall; Jepson	Stadium: Forum Horsens Arena

25 March 1931 Friendly	Bournemouth & Boscombe Athletic	3–3	Southampton	Bournemouth
			Haines	Stadium: Dean Court

4 May 1931 Hampshire BC	Southampton	0–4	Portsmouth	Southampton
			Weddle; Easson; Rutherford	Stadium: The Dell

6 May 1931 Rowland Hospital Cup	Portsmouth	2–2	Southampton	Portsmouth
	Easson; Weddle		Allan; Haddleton	Stadium: Fratton Park; Attendance: 2,098; Referee: Arthur Kingscott

== Player details ==
Southampton used 36 different players during the 1930–31 season, 15 of whom scored during the campaign. The team played in a 2–3–5 formation throughout, using two full-backs, three half-backs, two outside forwards, two inside forwards and a centre-forward. Arthur Bradford, Bert Jepson and Bill Adams made the most appearances for the club during the campaign, all playing in 40 games across all competitions. Left-back Michael Keeping played in 39 games, missing four league matches and the two end-of-season cup games. Centre-forward Willie Haines finished as the season's top scorer with 15 goals in the Second Division, followed by Johnny Arnold on eight goals. Four players – Herbert Coates, Bill Fraser, Bert Jepson and Johnny McIlwaine – scored seven goals in the league.

At the end of the season, 15 players offered new contracts by the club refused to sign the terms or play in the final games of the season against Portsmouth. For the Hampshire Benevolent Cup match, Hampshire FA secretary G. J. Eden arranged a "Hampshire County Team" to play against Pompey at The Dell, which included just three players with first-team appearances during the season. Alongside Bill Adams, Arthur Haddleton and Coates were reserve team players Bill Soffe, Reg Thomas and Ernie Warren, as well as returning former players Len Butt, George Harkus, Bill Rawlings and Arthur Dominy, plus Cardiff City striker Frank Matson. Soffe, Thomas and Warren also played in the Rowland Hospital Cup, alongside fellow reserves Fred Allan, Chris Crossley and Sid Grover.

=== Squad statistics ===
Name	Pos.	Nat.	League		FA Cup		Other (Note: "Other" includes the Rowland Hospital Cup and Hampshire Benevolent Cup matches.)		Total	
Name	Pos.	Nat.	Apps.	Gls.	Apps.	Gls.	Apps.	Gls.	Apps.	Gls.
Bill Adams	HB	(England)	37	0	1	0	2	0	40	0
Fred Allan	FW	(England)	0	0	0	0	1	1	1	1
Johnny Arnold	FW	(England)	30	8	1	0	0	0	31	8
Arthur Bradford	HB	(England)	39	0	1	0	0	0	40	0
Herbert Coates	FW	(England)	16	7	1	0	2	0	19	7
Peter Cowper	FW	(England)	4	0	0	0	0	0	4	0
Chris Crossley	FW	(England)	0	0	0	0	1	0	1	0
Laurie Cumming	FW	(Republic of Ireland)	20	4	1	0	0	0	21	4
Peter Dougall	FW	(Scotland)	14	4	0	0	0	0	14	4
Bill Fraser	FW	(England)	22	7	0	0	0	0	22	7
Sid Grover	FW	(England)	0	0	0	0	1	0	1	0
Arthur Haddleton	FW	(England)	1	0	0	0	2	1	3	1
Willie Haines	FW	(England)	21	15	0	0	0	0	21	15
Ted Hough	FB	(England)	3	0	0	0	0	0	3	0
Bert Jepson	FW	(England)	39	7	1	0	0	0	40	7
Michael Keeping	FB	(England)	38	1	1	0	0	0	39	1
Bill Luckett	HB	(England)	21	0	0	0	0	0	21	0
Jerry Mackie	FW	(Scotland)	14	5	0	0	0	0	14	5
Johnny McIlwaine	HB	(Scotland)	26	7	1	0	0	0	27	7
Arthur Roberts	FB	(England)	4	0	0	0	0	0	4	0
Bert Scriven	GK	(England)	29	0	0	0	0	0	29	0
Bert Shelley	HB	(England)	23	0	1	0	1	0	25	0
Bill Soffe	GK	(England)	0	0	0	0	2	0	2	0
Billy Stage	FW	(England)	4	1	0	0	0	0	4	1
Bill Stoddart	HB	(England)	0	0	0	0	1	0	1	0
Reg Thomas	FB	(England)	0	0	0	0	2	0	2	0
Ernie Warren	FW	(England)	0	0	0	0	2	0	2	0
Reg Watson	FW	(England)	5	1	0	0	0	0	5	1
Willie White	GK	(Scotland)	13	0	1	0	0	0	14	0
Arthur Wilson	HB	(England)	13	5	0	0	0	0	13	5
Stan Woodhouse	HB	(England)	26	0	1	0	0	0	27	0
Players who appeared for the club as guests
Len Butt	HB	(England)	0	0	0	0	1	0	1	0
Arthur Dominy	FW	(England)	0	0	0	0	1	0	1	0
George Harkus	HB	(England)	0	0	0	0	1	0	1	0
Frank Matson	FW	(Wales)	0	0	0	0	1	0	1	0
Bill Rawlings	FW	(England)	0	0	0	0	1	0	1	0

=== Most appearances ===
Rank	Name	Pos.	League		FA Cup		Other		Total	
Rank	Name	Pos.	Apps.	%	Apps.	%	Apps.	%	Apps.	%
1	Arthur Bradford	HB	39	92.86	1	100.00	0	0.00	40	88.89
1	Bert Jepson	FW	39	92.86	1	100.00	0	0.00	40	88.89
1	Bill Adams	HB	37	88.10	1	100.00	2	100.00	40	88.89
4	Michael Keeping	FB	38	90.48	1	100.00	0	0.00	39	86.67
5	Johnny Arnold	FW	30	71.43	1	100.00	0	0.00	31	68.89
6	Bert Scriven	GK	29	69.05	0	0.00	0	0.00	29	64.44
7	Johnny McIlwaine	HB	26	61.90	1	100.00	0	0.00	27	60.00
7	Stan Woodhouse	HB	26	61.90	1	100.00	0	0.00	27	60.00
9	Bert Shelley	HB	23	54.76	1	100.00	1	50.00	25	55.56
10	Bill Fraser	FW	22	52.38	0	0.00	0	0.00	22	48.89

=== Top goalscorers ===
Rank	Name	Pos.	League		FA Cup		Other		Total	
Rank	Name	Pos.	Gls.	GPG	Gls.	GPG	Gls.	GPG	Gls.	GPG
1	Willie Haines	FW	15	0.71	0	0.00	0	0.00	15	0.71
2	Johnny Arnold	FW	8	0.26	0	0.00	0	0.00	8	0.25
3	Herbert Coates	FW	7	0.43	0	0.00	0	0.00	7	0.36
3	Bill Fraser	FW	7	0.31	0	0.00	0	0.00	7	0.31
3	Johnny McIlwaine	HB	7	0.26	0	0.00	0	0.00	7	0.25
3	Bert Jepson	FW	7	0.17	0	0.00	0	0.00	7	0.17
7	Arthur Wilson	HB	5	0.38	0	0.00	0	0.00	5	0.38
7	Jerry Mackie	FW	5	0.35	0	0.00	0	0.00	5	0.35
9	Peter Dougall	FW	4	0.28	0	0.00	0	0.00	4	0.28
9	Laurie Cumming	FW	4	0.20	0	0.00	0	0.00	4	0.19

== Bibliographty ==
- Chalk, Gary; Holley, Duncan (10 August 1987), A Complete Record of Southampton Football Club: 1885–1987, Derby, England: Breedon Books, ISBN 978-0907969228
- Chalk, Gary; Holley, Duncan; Bull, David (28 November 2013), All the Saints: A Complete Who's Who of Southampton FC, Bristol, England: Hagiology Publishing, ISBN 978-0992686406
- Juson, Dave; Aldworth, Clay; Bendel, Barry; Bull, David; Chalk, Gary (10 November 2004), Saints v Pompey: A History of Unrelenting Rivalry, Bristol, England: Hagiology Publishing, ISBN 978-0953447459
