= 1934 FA Cup final =

- Event: 1933–34 FA Cup
Manchester City	Portsmouth
2	1
- Date: 28 April 1934
- Venue: Wembley Stadium, London
- Referee: Stanley Rous
- Attendance: 93,258

The 1934 FA Cup final was won by Manchester City in a 2–1 win over Portsmouth. The match is most remembered for a young Frank Swift's heroics in goal and the predictions of City forward Fred Tilson. The match was also refereed by future FIFA president Stanley Rous, in his penultimate game as an official.

== Route to the final ==
Both Manchester City and Portsmouth entered the competition in the third round, the entry point for First Division clubs. The third round draw saw an unusual number of contests between First Division clubs; twelve top-flight teams faced a fellow First Division club. Manchester City were among this number, with a home tie against six-time cup winners Blackburn Rovers. Manchester City won 3–1 in front of the largest crowd of the round. The Manchester Guardian described City's win as "notable... ...for the surprising ease with which it was gained". The wing play of Eric Brook and Ernie Toseland was central to the victory. Brook scored the first goal on a rebound after his shot from a free-kick was blocked. Blackburn then equalized, but Toseland scored either side of half-time to make the score 3–1. City were then drawn away against Second Division Hull City. Two quick goals shortly before half-time gave Manchester City a 2–0 lead, but Hull regrouped in the second half. First Jack Hill headed a goal from a corner, then, under pressure from Bill McNaughton, Bill Dale diverted a Hull cross into his own net for the equalizing goal. Following the 2–2 draw, the Blues resoundingly won the replay 4–1. Sheffield Wednesday were the opponents in the fifth round. Once again a score draw was fought out. However, Manchester City won the replay by two goals to none. The sixth round was a home tie with Stoke City, a match seen by 84,569 fans, which is still the record highest attendance at an English club ground. The Potters were beaten 1–0, setting up an intriguing semi-final against Aston Villa, who had knocked out the three-time champions Arsenal in the previous round. The game was played at Leeds Road in Huddersfield, and produced a big shock. The Blues won 6–1.

Portsmouth started away to Manchester United, who at the time of the match were in the relegation zone of the Second Division. Following a 1–1 draw, Portsmouth won the Fratton Park replay 4–1. Under the guidance of Jack Tinn, Portsmouth managed to only concede five goals in the whole competition, two of those in the first round. After defeating Grimsby Town and Swansea Town 2–0 and 1–0 respectively, they faced Bolton Wanderers in the quarter-finals. Bolton had scored 12 goals in three FA Cup games thus far, however they could not get a goal against Portsmouth, who won emphatically, 3–0. Leicester City were the opponents in the semi-final, held at St Andrew's, Birmingham, in front of a record crowd for the venue. Portsmouth took an early lead, when a Jack Smith free kick was received by Rutherford, who set up the scoring chance for Jack Weddle. 15 minutes later Weddle scored again, from a Fred Worrall cross. After a flurry of chances Leicester got a goal back before half-time, but Portsmouth had the better of the second-half. First Weddle completed his hat-trick, then Rutherford took advantage of poor positioning from the Leicester defense to score a fourth Portsmouth goal, to make the final score 4–1.

== Build-up ==
In the days leading up to the match, Manchester City stayed in a hotel in Southport. The team travelled south on the Friday, and stayed in Chingford the night before the game. Before travelling, Jackie Bray and Jimmy McLuckie had one-hour fitness tests, but both were passed fit. Portsmouth opted not to go to a training retreat, and remained in Portsmouth.

Of the 93,000 tickets available for the final, 53,000 were standing places, and 40,000 were seats. Prices ranged from 21 shillings to 2s 6d. However, in the week of the final tickets changed hands for well in excess of their face value. Standing tickets were priced at 16s, more than six times their original value. Speculators priced 5 shilling tickets at 25s, 7s 6d tickets at 29s, 10s 6d at 34s, 15s at 39s, and 21s at 45s. The issue was raised in Parliament by Westhoughton MP Rhys Davies, who voiced his concern that such resale was an evasion of Entertainments Duty.

Catering arrangements took into account the teams involved. In the words of a Wembley official: "It is curious that when we get two Northern teams in the Final there is always an exceptional demand for meat pies. They are a Northern delicacy, but as there is a Southern team this year there should be a 50-50 demand for meat pies for Northern visitors and sandwiches from the South." 50,000 bottles of beer were also available.

The London, Midland and Scottish Railway put on 65 special trains to London for the match, of which "14 or 15" were scheduled to run from Manchester.

== Final ==
The Manchester City team contained eight players who had started the 1933 final. The superstitious Portsmouth manager Jack Tinn wore white spats over his shoes, as he had done throughout the cup run. The 1934 final was played in wet conditions. On 26 minutes, Jack Weddle aimed a pass over the head of Cowan to Septimus Rutherford. The winger's shot was touched by Swift, but not strongly enough to prevent a goal for Portsmouth. The goalkeeper recounted his disappointment at conceding in his 1949 autobiography: "Rutherford, the Pompey outside-right, came coasting in and fired a ball across the goal to my right hand. I dived and the ball slithered through into the net off my fingers. I was desolate, and as I picked the ball out of the net, thought "Just another Wembley goalkeeper."" Swift blamed the goal on his decision not to wear gloves in the wet conditions; the teenage goalkeeper had opted to imitate the choice of his opposite number, the more experienced Jock Gilfillan.

With seventeen minutes to go, Jimmy Allen, Portsmouth's tall defender, temporarily left the field injured. While Manchester City had the man advantage, Busby took a throw in and played the ball to Brook. Brook played the ball through to Tilson, who put the ball across Gilfillan and into the goal. There was more to come however, as, with three minutes to go, Tilson latched on to a cross from Herd, to rifle the ball home.

At the other end of the pitch, Frank knew that all his team had to do was hold on for another two minutes and they would win. A photographer behind the goal was making him more nervous by counting down the seconds on his watch. When the game ended, Frank fainted in relief. The young goalkeeper went on to captain England in the future, his goalkeeping error forgotten.

It was the latest that a team was losing the final before going on to win since 1877.

The gate receipts for the match were £24,950, a slight increase on the previous year.

=== Aftermath ===
Matt Busby, who later achieved great successes as manager of City's rivals Manchester United, was the last surviving player on the winning side by the time of his death in January 1994, at the age of 84. Jimmy Allen, on the losing side, died a year later at the age of 85 and was believed to be the last surviving player from the game. (The fate of David Thackeray, also from Portsmouth, who retired after 1936, is not known.)

Frank Swift, who moved into football journalism after retiring from playing, was killed in the Munich air disaster in February 1958 along with 22 other people, including eight Manchester United players. Matt Busby was seriously injured in the crash but survived.

== Match details ==
28 April 1934
15:00 BST

Manchester City	2–1	Portsmouth
Tilson 74' 88'	Report	Rutherford 28'

Wembley, London
Attendance: 93,258
Referee: Stanley Rous, Hertfordshire

Manchester City	Portsmouth

GK	(England) Frank Swift
RB	(England) Laurie Barnett
LB	(England) Bill Dale
RH	(Scotland) Matt Busby
CH	(England) Sam Cowan (c)
LH	(England) Jackie Bray
OR	(England) Ernie Toseland
IR	(England) Bobby Marshall
CF	(Scotland) Alec Herd
IL	(England) Eric Brook
OL	(England) Fred Tilson
Manager:
(England) Wilf Wild

GK	(Scotland) Jock Gilfillan
RB	(Northern Ireland) Alec Mackie
LB	(England) Billy Smith
RH	(Scotland) Jimmy Nichol
CH	(England) Jimmy Allen (c)
LH	(Scotland) David Thackeray
OR	(England) Fred Worrall
IR	(England) Jack Smith
CF	(England) Jack Weddle
IL	(Scotland) Jimmy Easson
OL	(England) Septimus Rutherford
Manager:
(England) Jack Tinn

Match rules

- 90 minutes.
- 30 minutes of extra-time if necessary.
- Replay if scores still level.

== Road to Wembley ==
=== Manchester City ===
Round 3: Blackburn Rovers 1–3 Manchester City

Round 4: Hull City 2–2 Manchester City

Replay: Manchester City 4–1 Hull City

Round 5: Sheffield Wednesday 2–2 Manchester City

Replay: Manchester City 2–0 Sheffield Wednesday

Round 6: Manchester City 1–0 Stoke City

Semi-final: Manchester City 6–1 Aston Villa

(at Leeds Road)

=== Portsmouth ===
Round 3: Manchester United 1–1 Portsmouth

Replay: Portsmouth 4–1 Manchester United

Round 4: Portsmouth 2–0 Grimsby Town

Round 5: Swansea Town 0–1 Portsmouth

Round 6: Bolton Wanderers 0–3 Portsmouth

Semi-final: Portsmouth 4–1 Leicester City

(at St Andrew's)

== Bibliography ==
- Creighton, John (1993). Manchester City: Moments to Remember (2nd ed.). Wilmslow: Sigma. ISBN 1-85058-397-8.
- Maddox, John; Saffer, David; Robinson, Peter (1999). Manchester City Cup Kings 1956. Liverpool: Over the Moon. ISBN 1-872568-66-1.
- Pawson, Tony (1972). 100 Years of the FA Cup. London: Heinemann. ISBN 0-330-23274-6.
- Swift, Frank; Peskett, Roy (1949). Football From The Goalmouth. London: Sporting Handbooks.
- Ward, Andrew (1984). The Manchester City Story. Derby: Breedon. ISBN 0-907969-05-4.
