= Fred Dunmore =

English footballer

Personal information
- Full name: Alfred Dunmore
- Date of birth: 1 January 1911
- Place of birth: South Shields, England
- Date of death: 1991 (aged 80)
- Height: 5 ft 8 in (1.73 m)
- Position: Outside right

Youth career
- Stanhope Road School
- 1928–1929: Simonside

Senior career*
Years	Team	Apps	(Gls)
1929	Newcastle United Swifts		
1929–1930	Newcastle United	0	(0)
1930–1932	Derby County	0	(0)
1932–1933	Southampton	1	(0)
1933–1934	Mansfield Town		
- * Club domestic league appearances and goals

Alfred Dunmore (1 January 1911 – 1991) was an English professional footballer who made one Football League appearance for Southampton in 1932.

== Football career ==
Dunmore was born in South Shields and was educated at Stanhope Road School, representing County Durham Schools, before joining local club, Simonside, in 1928. He was soon recruited by Newcastle United, firstly joining their third team, before signing a professional contract for the first team in 1928. He failed to make a first-team appearance for Newcastle and moved on to Derby County in April 1930.

Still not having made a League appearance, he joined Southampton, of the Football League Second Division in June 1932. He made his only first-team appearance when he replaced Dick Neal as outside right for the match against West Ham United on 24 September 1932. The match was won 4–3, with a hat-trick from Johnny Arnold. Dunmore spent the remainder of his time at the Saints in the reserves, scoring nine goals in 47 matches.

At the end of the season, he was released from his contract and he wound up his career at Mansfield Town.
