= Henry O'Grady =

English footballer

Harry O'Grady
Personal information
- Full name: Henry O'Grady
- Date of birth: 16 March 1907
- Place of birth: Tunstall, Staffordshire, England
- Date of death: 12 April 1990 (aged 83)
- Place of death: Bucknall, Staffordshire, England
- Height: 1.80 m (5 ft 11 in)
- Positions: Inside forward; right-half

Youth career
- 1928–1929: Nantwich Victoria

Senior career*
Years	Team	Apps	(Gls)
1929	Nantwich		(7)
1929	Witton Albion		
1929–1931	Port Vale	1	(0)
1931–1932	Southampton	7	(2)
1932–1933	Leeds United	8	(2)
1933–1934	Burnley	13	(8)
1934–1935	Bury	15	(4)
1935–1936	Millwall	4	(0)
1936–1937	Carlisle United	28	(9)
1937–1938	Accrington Stanley	23	(2)
1938–1939	Tunbridge Wells Rangers		
Total		99+	(27+)
- * Club domestic league appearances and goals

Henry O'Grady (16 March 1907 – 12 April 1990) was an English footballer who played at inside forward for Nantwich, Witton Albion, Port Vale, Southampton, Leeds United, Burnley, Bury, Millwall, Carlisle United, Accrington Stanley, and Tunbridge Wells Rangers. Never spending more than two seasons at any club, he made 99 league appearances, playing in every division of the Football League between 1930 and 1938.

== Career ==
O'Grady played for Cheshire County League sides Nantwich and Witton Albion before joining Port Vale in November 1929. He made his debut playing at right-half in a 3–0 win over Wigan Borough at Springfield Park on 25 January 1930; this was his only appearance of the 1929–30 Third Division North winning campaign. He did not feature at the Old Recreation Ground in the 1930–31 season and left the "Valiants" in the summer.

He moved on to Second Division side Southampton in August 1931. He scored on his "Saints" debut in a 3–0 victory over Burnley at Turf Moor on 29 August. Despite this, he spent most of his one season at The Dell in the reserves, making occasional first-team appearances as a replacement for Bill Fraser at inside-right or Arthur Wilson at inside-left. At the end of the 1931–32 season, having made only seven first-team appearances (scoring twice) he was offered the chance to move to Leeds.

He joined Leeds United in August 1932, but with Arthur Hydes established at number eight, he again found first-team opportunities limited. He scored twice in eight First Division games for Leeds in 1932–33. After a year at Elland Road, he drop back down into the Second Division to play for Burnley in 1933–34. Despite a record of eight goals in only 13 league games, he was allowed to switch to league rivals Bury in 1934–35. He hit four goals in 15 appearances for the "Shakers" before leaving Gigg Lane for Millwall. He appeared in just four Third Division South games for the "Lions" in 1935–36. He then scored nine goals in 28 Third Division North appearances for Carlisle United in 1936–37. He switched to league rivals Accrington Stanley in 1937–38, and scored twice in 23 fixtures at Peel Park. He later ended his career in the Southern League with Tunbridge Wells Rangers.

== Career statistics ==
Appearances and goals by club, season and competition
Club	Season	League			FA Cup		N/S Cup		Total	
Club	Season	Division	Apps	Goals	Apps	Goals	Apps	Goals	Apps	Goals
Port Vale	1929–30	Third Division North	1	0	0	0	—		1	0
Southampton	1931–32	Second Division	7	2	0	0	—		7	2
Leeds United	1932–33	First Division	8	2	1	0	—		9	2
Burnley	1933–34	Second Division	13	8	2	0	—		15	8
Bury	1934–35	Second Division	15	4	1	1	—		16	5
Millwall	1935–36	Third Division South	4	0	0	0	0	0	4	0
Carlisle United	1936–37	Third Division North	28	9	1	1	3	1	32	11
Accrington Stanley	1937–38	Third Division North	23	2	4	1	1	0	28	3
Career total			99	27	9	3	4	1	112	31

== Honours ==
Port Vale

- Football League Third Division North: 1929–30
