= Tom Ruddy =

English footballer

Personal information
- Full name: Thomas Ruddy
- Date of birth: 1 March 1902
- Place of birth: Stockton-on-Tees, England
- Date of death: 1 November 1979 (aged 77)
- Place of death: Middlesbrough, England
- Height: 5 ft 8 in (1.73 m)
- Position: Inside forward

Youth career
- Stockton Shamrocks

Senior career*
Years	Team	Apps	(Gls)
1924–1928	Darlington	66	(37)
1928–1931	Derby County	22	(9)
1931–1932	Chesterfield	18	(6)
1932–1934	Southampton	24	(3)
1934–19??	Spennymoor United		
- * Club domestic league appearances and goals

Thomas Ruddy (1 March 1902 – 11 November 1979) was an English professional footballer who played as an inside-forward for Darlington, Derby County, Chesterfield and Southampton in the 1920s and 1930s.

== Football career ==
Ruddy was born in Stockton-on-Tees and played his early football with Stockton Shamrocks. In October 1924 he joined Darlington, then played in the Football League Third Division North, as a trainee. Darlington was promoted at the end of the season as champions and Ruddy became a professional in the summer of 1925.

Described as a "quick forward, with a hard shot", Ruddy spent three seasons playing in the Football League with Darlington making 66 appearances, and scoring 37 goals. On 7 January 1928, he and Harry Lees both scored hat-tricks in a 9–2 victory over Lincoln City; this was Darlington's record victory in a Football League match.

In May 1928, Ruddy moved to Derby County of the First Division where in 3 1/2 years he only made 22 league appearances, scoring nine goals, including two in a 6–1 defeat of Manchester United on 30 March 1929. He then dropped down to the Second Division with Chesterfield in December 1931, before moving to the south coast to join another Second Division club, Southampton in September 1932.

Ruddy had been recommended to the Saints by Dick Neal who had played alongside him briefly at Derby County. Like Neal, his fee was partially met by the Saints' Supporters Club.

Ruddy made his debut on 24 December 1932, when he took the place of Herbert Coates at inside-left against Preston North End. Coates returned for the next match, and it was not until February that Ruddy, now at inside-right was able to become a settled member of the side. In the next season, Ruddy played the first six matches at inside-left, before losing out to Coates. Ruddy was recalled to the side for the last time in November when he made three appearances before being dropped in favor of Arthur Holt.

Ruddy was released from his contract in the 1934 close season and returned to the north-east, playing in the North Eastern League with Spennymoor United.
