= Jimmy Harris (footballer, born 1907) =

English footballer (1907–1974)

Personal information
- Full name: James William Harris
- Date of birth: 9 March 1907
- Place of birth: Tunbridge Wells, England
- Date of death: 1974 (aged 66–67)
- Place of death: Maidstone, Kent, England
- Height: 5 ft 8 in (1.73 m)
- Position: Outside forward

Youth career
- Folkestone

Senior career*
Years	Team	Apps	(Gls)
1929–1932	West Ham United	7	(1)
1932–1933	Southampton	2	(0)
Total		9	(1)
- * Club domestic league appearances and goals

James William Harris (9 March 1907 – 1974) was an English professional footballer who played as an outside-forward in the Football League for West Ham United and Southampton in the 1930s.

== Football career ==
Harris was born in Tunbridge Wells, Kent and played his early football with Folkestone in the Southern League Eastern Section before joining West Ham United of the Football League First Division in December 1929.

He made his debut for the Hammers on Christmas Day 1930, playing at inside-left in the absence of Jimmy Ruffell, in a 4–3 victory over Portsmouth and retained his place for a further three matches, scoring in a 5–5 draw against Aston Villa on 3 January 1931. Following Ruffell's return, he only made one further appearance that season, in April, followed by two in January/February 1932.

In July 1932, he moved to the south coast to join Second Division Southampton. He played in the first two matches of the 1932–33 season at outside-left before Johnny Arnold returned from playing cricket with Hampshire. Harris spent the remainder of his time at The Dell playing in the reserves, scoring eight goals in 44 appearances, but was released from his contract in the summer of 1933.
