= Arthur Neal (footballer) =

English footballer (1903–1982)

Personal information
- Full name: Arthur Marshall Neal
- Date of birth: 20 December 1903
- Place of birth: Rotherham, England
- Date of death: 1982 (aged 78)
- Place of death: Rotherham, England
- Height: 5 ft 11 in (1.80 m)
- Position: Outside right

Senior career*
Years	Team	Apps	(Gls)
	Rotherham County	0	(0)
1925–192?	Gainsborough Trinity		
192?–1927	Anston Athletic		
1927	Frickley Colliery		(0)
1927–1928	Liverpool	0	(0)
1928–192?	Darlington	2	
- Denaby United
1929–	Kettering Town		
1930–193?	Folkestone		
- * Club domestic league appearances and goals

Arthur Marshall Neal (20 December 1903 – 1982) was an English footballer who played as an outside right in the Football League for Darlington. He was on the books of Rotherham County and Liverpool without playing League football for either, and also played non-league football for Gainsborough Trinity, Anston Athletic, Frickley Colliery, Denaby United, Kettering Town and Folkestone.

Neal was born in 1903 in Rotherham, which was then in the West Riding of Yorkshire, and died there in 1982 at the age of 78. His younger brother Dick played as a winger for clubs including Blackpool and Southampton, and Dick's son, also named Dick, played as a wing half for clubs including Birmingham City and Lincoln City in the 1950s and 1960s.
