= Jimmy Easson =

Scottish footballer

Personal information
- Full name: James Ferrier Easson
- Date of birth: 3 January 1906
- Place of birth: Brechin, Scotland
- Date of death: 20 May 1983 (aged 77)
- Place of death: Birmingham, England
- Position: Inside forward

Youth career
- Grange (Arbroath)
- Carnoustie
- East Craigie

Senior career*
Years	Team	Apps	(Gls)
19??–1928	Dundee		
1928–1939	Portsmouth	292	(102)
1939	Fulham	3	(0)

International career
1931–1933	Scotland	3	(1)
- * Club domestic league appearances and goals

James Ferrier Easson (3 January 1906 – 20 May 1983) was a Scottish footballer who played as an inside-forward for Portsmouth in the English Football League, helping them reach the FA Cup Final in 1934. He also made three appearances for the Scotland national team.

== Football career ==
Easson was born in Brechin and played for various Scottish junior clubs, including Carnoustie and East Craigie before joining Dundee. Portsmouth's Scottish scouts recommended him to manager Jack Tinn and he came south in 1928.

He moved to the south coast of England in 1928 to join Portsmouth, then becoming established in the Football League First Division. He made his debut for the first-team in a 0–0 draw against Manchester United at Old Trafford in May 1929, shortly after "Pompey" had been defeated in the 1929 FA Cup Final. This was followed a few days later by a match at The Dell against Southampton in the Hampshire Benevolent Cup. This match was played in torrential rain in front of the burnt out remains of the East Stand, which had been destroyed by fire four days earlier. Despite Easson's two goals, the "Saints" won the match 3–2.

Easson soon became a regular member of the Portsmouth side, replacing the ageing David Watson at inside-left and forming a useful partnership with Jack Weddle. He soon showed his scoring ability, with five goals in his first ten games.

His reputation grew in the 1930–31 season when he scored two hat-tricks within a month of each other, against Manchester United and Liverpool, both at Fratton Park. Shortly afterwards, he was named by the England selectors for their international side for a match against Ireland, but they realised their mistake when the records were checked for Easson's birthplace. He completed the 1930–31 season with 30 league and cup goals to help Pompey finish fourth in the First Division.

In May 1931, he was selected to join the Scotland national team on a tour of Europe. His first cap came in a 5–0 defeat against Austria on 16 May, followed by a match against Switzerland a week later, when Easson scored the opening goal in a 3–2 victory.

Despite his "frail and small appearance", he became one of the most feared inside forwards in the First Division and his partnership with Weddle made the pair feared throughout the league in the early 1930s. In 1931–32, Easson netted another hat-trick, missed only two games and scored 21 league goals, regularly scoring two in a match to establish himself as a firm favourite at Fratton Park.

His third and final Scotland appearance came in a 3–2 defeat by Wales on 4 October 1933.

Easson played in the 1934 FA Cup Final defeat against Manchester City at Wembley and stayed at Fratton Park until March 1939 when he joined Fulham. By now, he had lost his place at inside-left to Bert Barlow; his last game for Portsmouth ended identically to the first, against Manchester United with a 0–0 scoreline in December 1938. In his ten years with Portsmouth, he made a total of 312 first-team appearances, scoring 107 goals.

== Later career ==
His playing career was brought to an end following the outbreak of World War II, during which he returned to Scotland and guested for Carnoustie Panmure.

After the war, he returned to Fratton Park as a trainer, remaining with Portsmouth until July 1950. During his first spell as a trainer, Easson twice helped guide Portsmouth to the Football League championship: in 1948–49 and again the following season.

In 1951, he took up a coaching position at local rivals, Southampton, where he remained until February 1953. In April 1951, Easson was involved in an altercation with Southampton's Irish international goalkeeper, Hugh Kelly after a defeat at Leicester City. After the match, the team stayed in the Midlands to play a friendly match at Boston. Kelly returned to the team hotel with Ken Chisholm of Coventry City and two young ladies. When Easson tried to get the ladies to leave, he and Kelly had an argument which culminated in Kelly giving the trainer a black eye. As a result, Kelly was immediately placed on the transfer-list and never played for the "Saints" again.

Easson returned to Fratton Park for the 1957–58 season.

== Honours ==
Portsmouth

- FA Cup runner-up: 1933–34
