= Peter Cowper =

English footballer

Personal information
- Full name: Peter Poole Cowper
- Date of birth: 1 September 1902
- Place of birth: Tyldesley, England
- Date of death: 26 September 1962 (aged 60)
- Place of death: Clifton, Cumbria, England
- Height: 5 ft 8 in (1.73 m)
- Position: Outside forward

Youth career
- Burns Celtic
- Parkside Rangers
- Atherton Collieries

Senior career*
Years	Team	Apps	(Gls)
1923–1924	Wigan Borough	0	(0)
1924	Rossendale United	31	(11)
1924–1927	West Ham United	2	(0)
1927–1928	Grimsby Town	4	(0)
1928	Lancaster Town		
1928–1930	New Brighton	71	(19)
1930–1932	Southampton	5	(0)
1932	Southport	2	(1)
1932–1933	Carlisle United	12	(1)
1933–1934	Wigan Athletic	37	(13)
1934–1936	Altrincham		
1936–19??	Prescot Cables		
- * Club domestic league appearances and goals

Peter Poole Cowper (1 September 1902 – 26 September 1962) was an English professional footballer who played as an outside-forward in the 1920s and 1930s. Something of a journeyman, he played for ten clubs in his adult career, rarely spending more than two seasons with one club and only making a significant number of appearances for one Football League club, New Brighton, for whom he made 71 appearances from 1928 to 1930.

== Football career ==
Cowper was born at Tyldesley, near Wigan and played for the nearby Atherton Collieries team before he had an unsuccessful trial in 1921 at Bolton Wanderers. He joined Wigan Borough in 1923 before briefly moving on to Rossendale United the following year.

In June 1924, he moved to east London and signed with West Ham United of the Football League First Division, where he made his Football League debut on 11 October 1924 in place of Tommy Yews, playing at outside-right in a 1–1 draw with Bury. Cowper retained his place for the next match before Yews returned. Although Cowper remained with the Hammers for another two years, he made no further first-team appearances.

In June 1927, Cowper moved to Second Division Grimsby Town, where he made four league appearances. After a brief spell at Lancaster Town in the summer of 1928, Cowper moved on to New Brighton in August. Cowper stayed for two years for the Football League Third Division North side in which he made 71 league appearances, scoring 19 goals.

He moved to the south coast in June 1930, to return to the Second Division with Southampton. He made his debut for the Saints when he took the place of Irish international Laurie Cumming at inside-right in a 3–0 home defeat by Tottenham Hotspur on 26 December 1930. Cumming returned for the next match; later in the season, Cowper made three appearances at outside-right in place of Bert Jepson, followed by a single first-team appearance in February 1932. In his two years at The Dell, Cowper only managed five first-team appearances without scoring, although he scored 33 goals in 50 matches for the reserves.

Cowper was transferred to Southport in March 1932 where he only stayed four months before moving on to Carlisle United in July. After a year at Carlisle, he dropped out of the Football League and had spells in non-league football. He spent one season at Wigan Athletic, scoring 13 goals in 37 Cheshire League games, and went on to play for Altrincham and Prescot Cables.
