= Bill Charlton =

English footballer (1912–1998)

Personal information
- Full name: William Charlton
- Date of birth: 4 January 1912
- Place of birth: Eastleigh, England
- Date of death: 18 February 1998 (aged 86)
- Place of death: Epsom, England
- Position: Centre-forward

Youth career
- Oxford University

Senior career*
Years	Team	Apps	(Gls)
1931–1932	Southampton	2	(1)
1933–1936	Corinthian		
1934–1935	Hull City	3	(1)
1935–1936	Wimbledon		
1936–1938	Queens Park Rangers	20	(10)
1938	Barnet		
1938–1939	Leyton		
1939	Fulham	0	(0)

International career
1936–19??	England amateurs	4	(3)
- * Club domestic league appearances and goals

William Charlton (4 January 1912 – 18 February 1998) was an English footballer who played at centre-forward in the Football League for various clubs in the 1930s, including Southampton, Hull City and Queens Park Rangers. He also played for the Corinthians and the England national amateur football team.

== Football career ==
Charlton was born in Eastleigh and was educated at Peter Symonds School, Winchester before going up to St Edmund Hall at the University of Oxford where he represented Oxford University at football and won his blue.

While still at university, he joined Southampton of the Football League Second Division as an amateur, making two appearances at centre-forward; on 16 January 1932 in a 3–3 draw with Preston North End and on 13 February 1932 when he scored a consolation goal in a 5–1 defeat at Wolverhampton Wanderers.

Between 1933 and 1936, Charlton was a member of the Corinthian amateur club, for whom he made 20 appearances, scoring 16 goals, including two against Stade Francais in Paris in April 1934.

In November 1934, he joined Hull City scoring once in three league appearances, before a spell with Wimbledon. In May 1936, he signed his first professional contract with Queens Park Rangers and played 20 matches, scoring ten goals, in the Football League Third Division South.

He earned his first England amateur cap in 1936, making four appearances in total and scoring three goals, a hat-trick against Ireland.

== Later career ==
During the Second World War, William Charlton served in the Royal Navy, rising to rank of Lieutenant-Commander. After the war, Charlton worked for various oil companies including Shell Mex before retiring to Barnes, He died in 1998.
