= Reg Thomas (English footballer) =

English footballer

Personal information
- Full name: Reginald George Thomas
- Date of birth: 2 January 1912
- Place of birth: Weymouth, Dorset, England
- Date of death: 16 March 1983 (aged 71)
- Place of death: Weymouth, Dorset, England
- Height: 5 ft 10 in (1.78 m)
- Position: Full-back

Youth career
- Weymouth Central School
- Weymouth Wolves
- Weymouth

Senior career*
Years	Team	Apps	(Gls)
1930–1934	Southampton	8	(0)
1934–1935	Folkestone		
1935–1936	Bath City		
1936–1937	Guildford City		
1937–1938	Sittingbourne		
1938	Ashford Town		
1938–1939	Dartford		
1939	Margate		
- * Club domestic league appearances and goals

Reginald George Thomas (2 January 1912 – 16 March 1983) was an English professional footballer who played as a full-back in the Football League for Southampton in the 1930s.

== Football career ==
Ellison was born in Weymouth, Dorset and as a youth played for various clubs in his home town. In September 1930, he joined Southampton as an amateur, signing a professional contract in December.

Described as a "hard-tackling full-back", he was used as cover for long-serving Bill Adams. He spent most of his time with the Saints in the reserves, making 83 appearances in his four years at The Dell. His first-team debut came on 12 March 1932, when he took the place of Adams at right-back for the game against Bradford City, with Adams moving to the left in the absence of Arthur Roberts; the match was lost 1–0. Thomas retained his place for the next seven matches, before Charlie Sillett took over at left-back.

Thomas remained with the Saints for another two years, although he never made another first-team appearance, but was confined to the reserves, for whom he made 83 appearances.

In the summer of 1934, Thomas left professional football to join the Metropolitan Police Service, turning out occasionally for various non-league clubs across southern England.
