= Harry Loasby =

English footballer and manager

Personal information
- Full name: Henry Loasby
- Date of birth: 13 October 1911
- Place of birth: Kettering, England
- Date of death: 1990 (aged 78–79)
- Position: Centre forward

Senior career*
| Years | Team | Apps | (Gls) |
- Kettering Town
| 1927–1930 | Northampton Town | 27 | (25) |
| 1930–1931 | Gillingham | 35 | (19) |
| 1931–? | Luton Town | 15 | (14) |
- Kettering Town

Managerial career
- 1932–1935: Kettering Town
- * Club domestic league appearances and goals

Henry Loasby (13 October 1911 – 1990) was an English professional footballer. He made 77 Football League appearances for Northampton Town, Luton Town and Gillingham. He later had a spell as manager of his hometown club, Kettering Town.
