= Frank Matson =

Welsh footballer

Personal information
- Full name: Francis Robert Matson
- Date of birth: 21 November 1905
- Place of birth: Cardiff, Wales
- Date of death: 1985
- Height: 5 ft 8 in (1.73 m)
- Position: Outside right

Youth career
- Cardiff Corinthians

Senior career*
Years	Team	Apps	(Gls)
1925–1926	Reading	0	(0)
1926–1930	Cardiff City	27	(3)
1930	Newport County	1	(0)
1930–1932	Southampton	2	(0)
- * Club domestic league appearances and goals

Francis Robert Matson (21 November 1905 – 1985) was a Welsh professional footballer who played at outside-left for various clubs in the 1920s and 1930s, spending most of his playing career with Cardiff City.

== Football career ==
Matson was born in Cardiff and played his youth football with Cardiff Corinthians before joining Reading as a trainee. He then signed for Cardiff City, of the Football League First Division, in December 1926 but made only 14 appearances over the next three seasons. Following Cardiff's relegation to the Second Division in 1929, Matson was used more regularly, making 13 appearances in the league.

In August 1930, he was transferred to Newport County but made only one appearance before joining Southampton a few weeks later.

Matson spent two years at The Dell, spending most of his time in the reserves. His two first team appearances came in December 1931, when the club were trying to replace the injured Bert Jepson. In Jepson's absence, manager George Kay tried seven different players on the right wing, before Dick Neal was signed in February.

In the summer of 1932, Matson retired from professional football.
