= Jock Gilfillan =

Scottish footballer (1898–1976)

Personal information
- Full name: John E Gilfillan
- Date of birth: 29 September 1898
- Place of birth: Townhill, Fife, Scotland
- Date of death: 2 January 1976 (aged 77)
- Position: Goalkeeper

Senior career*
Years	Team	Apps	(Gls)
1919–1920	Inverkeithing United		
1920–1928	Heart of Midlothian	85	(0)
1920	→ Ayr United (loan)	0	(0)
1924	→ East Fife (loan)	0	(0)
1927	→ East Fife (loan)	0	(0)
1928–1937	Portsmouth	331	(0)
1937–1938	Queens Park Rangers	21	(0)
1937	→ Clapton Orient (loan)	0	(0)
- * Club domestic league appearances and goals

John E Gilfillan (29 September 1898 – 2 January 1976) was a Scottish footballer who played as a goalkeeper in the 1920s and 1930s, notably with Portsmouth.

He joined Heart of Midlothian from his local team Inverkeithing United, and played for Hearts in a 1922–23 Scottish Cup tie against Bo'ness. He was later loaned to East Fife, and played for them in the 1927 Scottish Cup Final against Celtic.

Gilfillan moved to play in England with Portsmouth of the Football League in December 1928. He was to go on to make 359 senior appearances with the south coast club, including playing for them in the 1929 and 1934 FA Cup Finals. In his nine seasons with the club he kept 107 clean sheets in 330 League matches.

In April 2009, he was included in a Times list of the Top 50 Portsmouth players of all time, and was described as being "one of the finest keepers in the club's history with excellent positioning and agility the key to his success."

== Honours ==
East Fife

- Scottish Cup runner-up: 1926–27

Portsmouth

- FA Cup runner-up: 1928–29, 1933–34
