= Arthur Tilford =

English footballer

Personal information
- Full name: Arthur Tilford
- Date of birth: 14 May 1903
- Place of birth: Ilkeston, England
- Date of death: 1993 (aged 89–90)
- Height: 5 ft 10 in (1.78 m)
- Position: Left-back

Youth career
- Trowell St Helens

Senior career*
| Years | Team | Apps | (Gls) |
| 1924–1926 | Nottingham Forest | 8 | (0) |
| 1926–1929 | Blackpool | 54 | (0) |
| 1929–1932 | Coventry City | 57 | (0) |
| 1932–1933 | Fulham | 36 | (0) |
| 1933 | Southampton | 10 | (0) |
| 1933–1934 | Fulham | 5 | (0) |
| 1934–1935 | Walsall | 25 | (0) |
- * Club domestic league appearances and goals

Arthur Tilford (14 May 1903 – 1993) was an English professional footballer who played as a full-back for various clubs in the 1920s and 1930s.

== Football career ==
Tilford was born in Ilkeston, Derbyshire and, after playing for a local village side, he joined First Division Nottingham Forest in May 1924. He made only one First Division appearance for Nottingham Forest as they were relegated at the end of the 1923–24 season. In the following season, he made only seven appearances, generally at left-half, as stand-in for Bob Wallace.

After two seasons at Forest, he was transferred to Blackpool where he was moved to left-back, replacing George Bradshaw. Tilford made a total of 55 appearances for Blackpool before being replaced in turn by Stan Ramsay.

Tilford then dropped down to the Third Division South when he joined Coventry City in May 1929, where he spent three seasons, before joining Fulham in February 1932. At the end of his first season with Fulham, they were promoted as champions to the Second Division.

Tilford had established himself at left-back when the death of his young daughter in late 1932 caused a loss of form. Manager Jimmy McIntyre had just agreed to sign Mike Keeping from Southampton and suggested that Tilford should move to The Dell temporarily to help him recover from his loss. During his short spell with Southampton, Tilford continued to train at Craven Cottage and made only ten appearances for the "Saints".

In the summer of 1933, Tilford re-signed with Fulham but by now Keeping had established himself at left-back and Tilford was unable to force himself back into the side. After only five more appearances, he moved to Walsall where he spent the 1934–35 season before retiring from professional football.
