= Jack Tinn =

English football manager

Personal information
- Date of birth: 20 January 1878
- Date of death: 13 March 1971 (aged 93)

Senior career*
Years	Team	Apps	(Gls)
- South Shields

Managerial career
- 1919–1927: South Shields
- 1927–1947: Portsmouth
- * Club domestic league appearances and goals

John William Tinn (20 January 1878 - 13 March 1971) was an English football manager. He managed South Shields in the early 1920s and Portsmouth from 1927 until 1947.

== Career ==
In 1919, the year South Shields were selected for the Football League Second Division, Tinn was named manager of the team. After several seasons of the club finishing in the top half of the table, he joined Portsmouth in 1927. Under Tinn's stewardship Portsmouth won the FA Cup for the first time in their history when they beat Wolverhampton Wanderers 4-1 at Wembley in 1939. Although Tinn departed in 1947 he is still credited with creating the great Pompey side which went on to win back-to-back league championships in 1949 and 1950. He also guided Pompey to the 1929 and 1934 cup finals.

Tinn famously credited the 1939 cup success to his 'lucky spats' which he wore in every round. He wore spats at all Cup ties and stored them in a safe in between.

Tinn reportedly stored the FA cup under his bed during WWII, along with other unusual storage locations.

In 1955 Tinn, as former chief scout, attended the funeral of F.H. Normansell, chairman of Aston Villa F.C..

== Honours won ==
=== As a manager ===
- Portsmouth
  - FA Cup winner 1939
  - FA Cup runner-up 1929 and 1934
