= Billy Stage =

English footballer (1893–1957)

Personal information
- Full name: William Stage
- Date of birth: 22 March 1893
- Place of birth: Whitby, England
- Date of death: 12 May 1957 (aged 64)
- Place of death: Blackley, England
- Height: 5 ft 7 in (1.70 m)
- Position: Inside forward

Senior career*
Years	Team	Apps	(Gls)
1913–1914	Middlesbrough	3	(0)
1919–1920	Hibernian	42	(4)
1920–1921	St Bernard's		
1921–1928	Bury	202	(33)
1928–1930	Burnley	25	(1)
1930–1931	Southampton	4	(1)
- Darwen
- Rossendale United
- Fleetwood
- * Club domestic league appearances and goals

William Stage (22 March 1893 – 12 May 1957) was an English professional association footballer who played as an inside forward. He spent the largest part of his career with Bury where he became team captain and helped them reach the Football League First Division in 1924.

== Football career ==
Stage was born in Whitby in North Yorkshire and joined nearby Middlesbrough in April 1913 as an amateur, signing a professional contract in December 1913. He only made three appearances for 'Boro before World War I caused league football to be suspended.

After the war, he joined Scottish club Hibernian, making his Scottish League debut at the start of the 1919–20 season. He played in every Hibs match during that season, scoring four league goals, plus one in the cup. Despite having been "ever-present", Stage left Hibernian at the end of the season; he then joined St Bernard's, of the Central League. St Bernard's were re-admitted to the Second Division in 1921.

In October 1921, Stage returned to England to join Bury, then playing in the Football League Second Division. In 1924, Stage was part of the Bury team that gained the runners-up position, thus earning promotion to the First Division. Stage went on to become captain of the club, winning the Lancashire Cup in 1926.

In June 1928, after making over 200 appearances for Bury, Stage joined First Division rivals, Burnley where he remained for two seasons before dropping into the Second Division when he joined Southampton in July 1930.

By now nearing the end of his career, Stage spent a year at The Dell, mostly assisting the reserves. Described as "a fetcher and forager on the field", Stage only made four first-team appearances, twice in September and twice in November. His final professional appearance came on 22 November 1930, when he scored in a 3–1 defeat at Charlton Athletic.

== Later career ==
After retiring from professional football, Stage returned to Lancashire where he settled in Bury, buying the Stanley Arms pub with his savings. He continued to play football at a non-league level, turning out for Darwen, Rossendale United and Fleetwood.

His daughter, Florence, married the professional cyclist Reg Harris in April 1946.

== Honours ==
Bury

- Football League Second Division runners-up: 1923–24
- Lancashire Senior Cup winners: 1926.
