= Fred Worrall =

English footballer

Personal information
- Full name: Frederick J. Worrall
- Date of birth: 8 September 1910
- Place of birth: Warrington, England
- Date of death: 13 April 1979 (aged 68)
- Place of death: Warrington, England
- Height: 5 ft 6 1/2 in (1.69 m)
- Position: Outside right

Youth career
- Witton Albion
- Nantwich

Senior career*
Years	Team	Apps	(Gls)
1928	Bolton Wanderers	0	(0)
1928–1931	Oldham Athletic	105	(21)
1931–1945	Portsmouth	313	(68)
1945	→ Manchester United (wartime)	7	(2)
1946	Crewe Alexandra	6	(1)
1946	Stockport County	0	(0)
Total		431	(92)

International career
1935–1936	England	2	(2)
	The Football League XI	2	(0)
- * Club domestic league appearances and goals

Frederick J. Worrall (8 September 1910 – 13 April 1979) was an English footballer born in Warrington, Lancashire, who played as an outside right in the Football League for Oldham Athletic, Portsmouth and Crewe Alexandra. He was capped twice for England, scoring on his debut against the Netherlands in Amsterdam in May 1935, before following it up with another goal in England's 3–1 win over Ireland in the British Championship in November 1936. He was noted for his superstitious nature: when Portsmouth played in the 1939 FA Cup Final, he took his small horseshoe, put a sprig of white heather in each sock, tied a small white elephant to one of his garters and put a lucky sixpence in his boots, as well as putting on Pompey manager Jack Tinn's lucky spats. He set up the second goal in Portsmouth's 4–1 win, and left the club at the end of the Second World War. He had continued to play for Portsmouth during the war, but also made seven appearances for Manchester United during the 1945–46 War League season, scoring twice.

== Honours ==
Portsmouth

- FA Cup: 1938–39; runner-up: 1933–34
