= Jimmy Nichol =

Scottish footballer

James Baillie Nichol (7 April 1903 – 24 November 1954) was a Scottish footballer. He played professionally for Gillingham and Portsmouth between 1925 and 1938. In total he made over 400 appearances in the Football League.

== Honours ==
Portsmouth

- FA Cup runner-up: 1928–29, 1933–34
