= Bill Fraser (English footballer) =

English footballer

Personal information
- Full name: William Fraser
- Date of birth: 1903
- Place of birth: Cowpen, England
- Height: 5 ft 8 in (1.73 m)
- Position: Inside forward

Youth career
- Blyth Spartans
- New Delaval Temperance
- Cowpen Celtic
- Royal Tank Corps
- East Stirlingshire

Senior career*
Years	Team	Apps	(Gls)
1926–1929	Northampton Town	17	(4)
1929	Aldershot	0	(0)
1929–1932	Southampton	56	(11)
1932–1933	Fulham	0	(0)
1933–1934	Northampton Town	3	(1)
1934	Hartlepools United	0	(0)
1934–????	Salisbury City		

Managerial career
- 1956: Walton & Hersham
- * Club domestic league appearances and goals

William Fraser (born 1903, date of death unknown) was an English professional footballer who played at inside forward for Northampton Town and Southampton in the 1920s and 1930s.

== Football career ==
=== Early career ===
Fraser was born in Cowpen, near Blyth, Northumberland and played for Blyth Spartans as a junior. He then had a spell in the Army, with the Royal Tank Corps before starting his professional career with Northampton Town in November 1926.

He spent two seasons with Northampton Town in the Third Division South, making 17 league appearances generally on the right wing, scoring four goals as well as providing scoring chances for centre forwards Ernie Cockle and Harry Loasby.

He signed for Aldershot, then in the Southern League, in May 1929 but before he made any first team appearances he was transferred to Second Division Southampton in June for a fee of £200.

=== Southampton ===
He made his "Saints" debut on 14 December 1929, replacing Oswald Littler at inside right in a 1–1 draw at Reading. Fraser made nine appearances in the No. 8 shirt, before being replaced by Jerry Mackie in March.

In the 1930–31 season, Fraser took over at centre forward from the injured Willie Haines after the first match of the season and during a run of thirteen games up front scored six goals before Johnny McIlwaine took over. Fraser then reverted to inside right before being replaced by Laurie Cumming for a few matches before Mackie returned in January, although Fraser played the last five games of the season.

By the start of the following season Mackie had retired, and Fraser played at inside forward until Christmas before injury forced him to miss most of the rest of the season. During his absence, manager George Kay tried eight players at No. 8, of which only Frank Osborne played more than four games.

According to Holley & Chalk, Fraser "had considerable ability, (but) suffered acutely from nerves in front of crowds". In July 1932, he was sold to Fulham for a fee of £500 (together with fellow forwards Arthur Haddleton and Bert Jepson) as the Saints were in serious financial difficulties and needed to raise funds.

=== Later career ===
He joined Fulham in July 1932, but was unable to break into the first team with long-serving Jim Hammond hardly missing a match for seven years.

In June 1933, Fraser returned to Northampton Town for one last season, before returning to southern England where he joined Salisbury City in 1934, becoming a player-coach in 1935. In 1956, he joined Walton & Hersham as manager.
