= Arthur Wilson (English footballer) =

English footballer (1908-2000)

Personal information
- Date of birth: 6 October 1908
- Place of birth: Newcastle upon Tyne, England
- Date of death: 31 January 2000 (aged 91)
- Place of death: Newcastle upon Tyne, England
- Height: 6 ft 0 in (1.83 m)
- Positions: Half back; inside forward

Youth career
- Newcastle & Northumberland Schools
- 1926–1927: Newcastle United Swifts

Senior career*
| Years | Team | Apps | (Gls) |
| 1927 | Scotswood | | |
| 1927–1932 | Southampton | 62 | (12) |
| 1932–1934 | West Ham United | 29 | (14) |
| 1934–1937 | Chester | 136 | (6) |
| 1937–1939 | Wolverhampton Wanderers | 0 | (0) |
| 1939–1940 | Torquay United | 10 | (0) |
- * Club domestic league appearances and goals

Arthur Wilson (6 October 1908 – 31 January 2000) was an English professional footballer who played as either a half back or inside forward for various clubs in the 1920s and 1930s.

== Football career ==
Wilson was born in Newcastle upon Tyne and represented Newcastle & Northumberland Schools before joining Newcastle United as a trainee. Never progressing beyond the third team, he was allowed to leave in early 1927 to join Scotswood playing in the North Eastern League.

He was quickly spotted by scouts from Southampton and he joined the south coast club in August 1927. After spending two seasons in the reserves, where he showed "admirable skill", he made his first-team debut when he replaced the veteran Bert Shelley for a Second Division match away to Reading on 14 December 1929. Wilson retained his position at left-half for the remainder of the season and for the start of the 1930–31 season. After three matches, he lost his place to Bill Adams and briefly switched to inside left before being replaced by Herbert Coates. In the following season, Wilson alternated with Coates and Peter Dougall for the inside-left position.

In May 1932, with the club in financial difficulties, Southampton placed Wilson on the transfer list and he was soon signed by West Ham United for a fee of £500. In his first season at Upton Park, Wilson managed 33 appearances at inside-left in league and cup matches, scoring 15 goals, including two against his former club on 4 February 1933. The following season, however, he lost his place to Len Goulden and made only two appearances before joining Chester in March 1934.

At Chester, his signing helped the club win eight of their last ten fixtures, thus avoiding relegation from Division Three North. The following season, Chester finished third in the table, going one better in the next; at this time, only the champions were promoted. Wilson remained with Chester until November 1937, before joining Wolverhampton Wanderers where he failed to make a first-team appearance. He moved on to his last club, Torquay United, in January 1939 where he remained until the start of the Second World War.
