= Bert Jepson =

English footballer (1902–1981)

Personal information
- Full name: Albert Edward Jepson
- Date of birth: 9 November 1902
- Place of birth: Glasshoughton, England
- Date of death: 18 December 1981 (aged 79)
- Place of death: Binfield, England
- Height: 5 ft 8 in (1.73 m)
- Position: Outside right

Youth career
- Castleford Town
- Allerton United

Senior career*
Years	Team	Apps	(Gls)
1926–1927	Frickley Colliery		
1927–1928	Huddersfield Town	0	(0)
1928–1932	Southampton	92	(18)
1932–1933	Fulham	0	(0)
1933–1935	Brighton & Hove Albion	45	(8)
1948	Hove		
- * Club domestic league appearances and goals

Albert Edward Jepson (9 November 1902 – 18 December 1981) was an English footballer who played as an outside right for Southampton and Brighton & Hove Albion in the 1920s and 1930s.

== Career ==
=== Huddersfield Town ===
Jepson was born in Glasshoughton, near Castleford in West Yorkshire and after leaving school worked in the coal mines, playing football with Frickley Colliery in the Midland League. He had previously played for Castleford Town and Allerton United. He was a late-comer to professional football. Just after his 25th birthday, he was taken on by Huddersfield Town in May 1927. At that time, Huddersfield were one of the top English football clubs, having won the Football League for three consecutive seasons in the mid-1920s, finishing as runners-up in 1926–27. With Scottish international Alex Jackson well-established at No. 7, Jepson had to content himself with a year in the reserves as Huddersfield again finished the season as League runners-up, coupled with a trip to Wembley for the 1928 FA Cup final, where they were defeated 3–1 by Blackburn Rovers.

=== Southampton ===
In August 1928, Jepson was one of seven new signings as Southampton's manager Arthur Chadwick started to re-build a side that had finished a disappointing 17th in the Second Division in the previous season. Jepson went straight into the first team, making his debut in the opening match of the 1928–29 season, a 2–2 draw at Hull City. Jepson was injured in that match and had to sit out the next two matches before settling into the outside right position.

In December 1928, he lost his place to Bobby Weale, who had just been signed from Swindon Town for a then club record of £1,000 Jepson regained his place at the end of March, playing in five of the last seven matches of the season, scoring three goals, as the "Saints" improved their league performance with a fourth-place finish.

Weale was back in favour for the start of the 1929–30 season, but by mid-season, his form had become erratic, and Jepson was recalled to the side in March, playing in the last nine matches, scoring three goals which came in three successive matches in April. With Weale leaving The Dell in the summer of 1930, Jepson made the No. 7 shirt his own, missing only two matches during the 1930–31 season, in which the Saints finished in mid-table.

Jepson again started the following season on the right, scoring in the season's opening match. Still, an injury in November put him out for several weeks before returning for another four games in January, when he was again injured. During his absences from the side, manager George Kay tried seven different players on the right wing before Dick Neal was signed in February. Neal's arrival brought Jepson's career with Southampton to an end, and although he was happy to remain with the club, he was put on the transfer list at a fee of £500. With no offers at this fee and the club struggling with increasing levels of debt, he was given a free transfer to Fulham in June 1932 (together with fellow forwards Bill Fraser and Arthur Haddleton) having made 95 appearances for the Saints, scoring 18 goals.

=== Later career ===
At Fulham, he found his favoured place at outside right occupied by another international, Welshman Billy Richards, and spent a frustrating season in the reserves.

In May 1933, he returned to the south coast, joining Brighton & Hove Albion where he played two seasons in the Third Division South before retiring in 1935.

After retiring from football, he became the manager of the Belgravia Dairy in Brighton. During World War II, he guested for Port Vale and Swansea Town, and in 1948, now aged 45, he was granted a special permit to join Sussex League side Hove as their player-coach.

== Personal life ==
He had a daughter by the name of Doreen.

== Career statistics ==
Appearances and goals by club, season and competition
Club	Season	League			Cup		Total	
Club	Season	Division	Apps	Goals	Apps	Goals	Apps	Goals
Huddersfield Town	1927–28	First Division	0	0	0	0	0	0
Southampton	1928–29	Second Division	18	4	0	0	18	4
Southampton	1929–30	Second Division	14	4	0	0	14	4
Southampton	1930–31	Second Division	39	7	1	0	40	7
Southampton	1931–32	Second Division	21	3	2	0	23	3
Southampton	Total		92	18	3	0	95	18
Fulham	1932–33	Second Division	0	0	0	0	0	0
Brighton & Hove Albion	1933–34	Third Division South	15	2	4	0	19	2
Brighton & Hove Albion	1934–35	Third Division South	30	6	5	3	35	9
Brighton & Hove Albion	Total		45	8	9	3	54	11
Career total			137	26	12	3	149	29
