= Arthur Haddleton =

English footballer (1910-1971)

Personal information
- Full name: Arthur Haddleton
- Date of birth: 6 April 1910
- Place of birth: Chester-le-Street, England
- Date of death: 5 January 1971 (aged 60)
- Place of death: Eastleigh, England
- Position: Centre forward

Youth career
- West Hartlepool Belle Vue Congs
- Horden Athletic
- Easington Colliery Welfare
- Horden Colliery Welfare

Senior career*
Years	Team	Apps	(Gls)
1930–1932	Southampton	17	(10)
1932–1933	Fulham	4	(4)
1933–1934	Swindon Town	7	(0)
1934–1935	Walsall	15	(4)
????	Pirelli General		
- * Club domestic league appearances and goals

Arthur Haddleton (6 April 1910 – 5 January 1971) was an English footballer who played as a centre forward for various clubs in the 1930s. Despite showing promise in the early part of his career, he eventually achieved very little, although he did score in eight consecutive matches in 1931.

== Football career ==
=== Early days ===
Haddleton was born in Chester-le-Street in County Durham and worked in the coal-mines, playing football for various colliery sides in the north east including Easington Colliery Welfare and Horden Colliery Welfare. He was spotted by scouts from Southampton and moved to the south coast in October 1930.

=== Southampton ===
He made an immediate impression at The Dell, scoring eleven goals from seventeen games for the reserves. He made his first-team debut in a 1–0 defeat in the Second Division at Bury on 18 April 1931. The following season, he replaced the injured Willie Haines after the first match of the season. He scored in a 3–2 victory over Manchester United on 2 September and then scored at least once in each of the next seven games. This run of nine goals in eight consecutive matches remains a club record. After scoring against Wolverhampton Wanderers on 3 October, he then only scored once more in the next five games. He was initially replaced by Ted Drake, who had also made a name for himself in the reserves, and only made a further three appearances for the "Saints" first-team, spending the rest of the season back in the reserves.

At the end of the season, he was one of three players (together with fellow forwards Bill Fraser and Bert Jepson) who were sold to Fulham as the Saints were in serious financial difficulties and needed to raise funds.

In his brief career at Southampton, Haddleton made 17 first-team appearances, scoring ten goals.

=== Later career ===
At Fulham, Haddleton scored twice on his debut and added two more goals from three matches, but was unable to displace Frank Newton as a regular in the side.

In the summer of 1933, he move to Swindon Town where he was moved to an inside forward role, with either Tommy Armstrong or Fred Fisher in the centre, but failed to score in seven matches.

He moved again in July 1934, this time to the Midlands to join Walsall where he was played at outside right alongside prolific goal-scorer Gilbert Alsop. After 15 appearances in the Third Division North, in which he scored four goals, Haddleton fractured his leg and was eventually forced to retire.

== After football ==
On abandoning his career as a professional footballer, Haddleton returned to Hampshire to live in Eastleigh where he was employed at the Pirelli General cable works, turning out for the works team. He died at Eastleigh in 1971, aged 60.
