= Dick Neal Sr. =

English footballer (1906–1986)

Personal information
- Full name: Richard Marshall Neal
- Date of birth: 14 January 1906
- Place of birth: Fencehouses, England
- Date of death: 26 December 1986 (aged 80)
- Place of death: Fence, England
- Height: 5 ft 8 in (1.73 m)
- Position: Winger

Youth career
- Dinnington Main Colliery Welfare

Senior career*
| Years | Team | Apps | (Gls) |
| 1925–1931 | Blackpool | 85 | (17) |
| 1931–1932 | Derby County | 10 | (1) |
| 1932–1937 | Southampton | 170 | (17) |
| 1937–1938 | Bristol City | 6 | (0) |
| 1938–1939 | Accrington Stanley | 21 | (7) |
| Total | | 292 | (42) |
- * Club domestic league appearances and goals

Richard Marshall Neal (14 January 1906 – 26 December 1986) was an English professional footballer who played as a winger. He spent most of his career at Blackpool and Southampton.

== Playing career ==
Neal was born in Fencehouses and started his playing career at Dinnington Main Colliery Welfare, from where, in 1925, he joined Blackpool, then in the Football League Second Division. He made his debut, in the number 7 shirt, on 1 May 1926, at Sheffield Wednesday in the final league game of the season. Over the next five seasons his appearance and goal totals in the league were: 17/3, 24/6, 32/5, 7/2 and 4/1. He helped Blackpool to the title in 1930, their only championship to date.

He spent the first half of the 1931–32 season at Derby County, and in February 1932, the Southampton Supporters' Club put up the funds to secure his transfer to replace Bert Jepson. Over the next few seasons he was rarely out of the side and was a model of consistency despite the team's failure to achieve anything of merit, finishing regularly in mid-table in Division Two.

In 1937, after 177 appearances for Southampton, he moved on to Bristol City before finishing his career at Accrington Stanley.

== Personal life ==
His son Dick Neal Jr. was a professional footballer who played as a half-back for Lincoln City and Birmingham City in the 1950s and 1960s, whilst his brother, Arthur, played briefly for Liverpool and Darlington. His brother-in-law was Freddie Gibson, who played as a goalkeeper for Hull City and Middlesbrough.

== Honours ==
Blackpool

- Division Two: 1929–30
