= Johnny Arnold =

English cricketer

Personal information
- Full name: John Arnold
- Born: 30 November 1907; Cowley, Oxfordshire, England
- Died: 4 April 1984 (aged 76); Southampton, Hampshire, England
- Height: 5 ft 7 in (1.70 m)
- Batting: Right-handed
- Bowling: Right-arm slow

International information
- National side: England
- Only Test (cap 259): 27 June 1931 v New Zealand

Domestic team information
- Years: Team
- 1929: Oxfordshire
- 1929–1950: Hampshire

Umpiring information
- FC umpired: 274 (1951–1972)
- LA umpired: 68 (1963–1972)

Career statistics
Competition	Test	First-class
Matches	1	402
Runs scored	34	21,831
Batting average	17.00	32.82
100s/50s	–/–	37/117
Top score	34	227
Balls bowled	–	1,489
Wickets	–	17
Bowling average	–	69.52
5 wickets in innings	–	–
10 wickets in match	–	–
Best bowling	–	3/34
Catches/stumpings	–/–	184/–
Source: Johnny Arnold at Cricinfo
10 May 2010
Association football career
- Position: Outside left
Senior career*
Years	Team	Apps	(Gls)
?–1928	Oxford City	?	(?)
1928–1933	Southampton	106	(46)
1933–1939	Fulham	213	(57)
International career
1933	England	1	(0)
- * Club domestic league appearances and goals

John Arnold (30 November 1907 – 4 April 1984) was an English professional cricketer and footballer. He played both sports at international level, earning a single Test cap for the England cricket team in 1931 against New Zealand, whilst also earning a single cap for the England national football team against Scotland in 1933. He is one of only twelve male professional football and cricket players for England. He played both sports extensively at domestic level, making over 400 appearances in first-class cricket, predominantly for Hampshire, where as a mostly opening batsman he made over 21,000 runs. In football, he played as an outside left for Oxford City, Southampton and Fulham, making over 300 professional appearances and scoring over 100 goals. Following the end of his cricket career, he became a first-class umpire between 1961 and 1972.

== Sporting career ==
=== Cricket ===
==== Playing career ====
Born in Cowley in November 1907, Arnold played minor counties cricket for Oxfordshire in 1929, making eight appearances in the Minor Counties Championship. He scored 650 runs for Oxfordshire during the season, at an average of 52.75, helping them to secure their first Minor Counties Championship title with an important innings of 62 not out against Buckinghamshire. In August 1929, he made his debut in first-class cricket for Hampshire against the touring South Africans at Southampton, having been recommended by Oxford-born Hampshire cricketer Alex Bowell. By the following season he had qualified by residency to represent Hampshire in the County Championship. Arnold made 23 appearances in the 1931 County Championship, predominantly as an attacking opening batsman alongside George Brown. He scored a thousand runs in his first full season, ending with 1,186 at an average of 32.05, which included two centuries. He topped the county batting averages that season, slightly ahead of Phil Mead.

Arnold began the 1931 season in good form, and by June he was on the England selectors minds for the first Test against New Zealand at Lord's, with Arnold ultimately being selected to open the batting alongside fellow debutant Fred Bakewell. The selection of both Arnold and Bakewell was necessitated by the retirement of Jack Hobbs the previous season, coupled with an injury to Herbert Sutcliffe. Arnold was dismissed in England's first innings without scoring by Ian Cromb, while in England's second innings he was dismissed for 34 runs by Roger Blunt, having shared in an opening stand of 62 with Bakewell. The experimental opening partnership between Arnold and Bakewell lasted just one match, with Arnold making no further appearances at Test level. Sutcliffe returning to replace him for the second Test. His 28 first-class matches in 1931 saw him pass a thousand runs for the second successive season, with 1,403 at an average of 31.17, which included three centuries.

In 1932, Arnold made 26 first-class appearances for Hampshire. He also played in two Gentlemen v Players matches at The Oval and Folkestone, representing the Players, a team which was made up of professional cricketers. Passing a thousand runs for the third successive season, he scored 1,680 runs at an average of 34.28. He made what would be his highest first-class score during the 1932 season, with 227 runs against Glamorgan at Cardiff. Despite passing a thousand runs in a season for the fourth successive time in 1933, Arnold found his returns diminished that season, with 1,086 runs at an average of 23.57, whilst also failing to score a century all season. His most prolific season came in 1934, when from 30 matches he scored 2,261 runs at an average of 48.10, making seven centuries; amongst the seven was a score of 109 not out against the touring Australians, a performance which saved Hampshire from certain defeat. His continued good form into 1935 led to his consideration for Test selection against South Africa that summer, though Arnold was ultimately overlooked, despite making 1,713 runs at an average of 31.14 across the season.

In 1936, he made thirty first-class appearances in which he scored 1,298 runs at an average of 28.84, whilst his 27 appearances in 1937 yielded him 1,705 runs at an average of 36.27; amongst his three centuries in 1937 was a score of 172, made against Cambridge University at Baskingstoke. He suffered a dramatic reversal of form in 1938, failing to pass a thousand runs in a season for the only time in his career, scoring just 849 runs at an average of 20.70. As a result, Hampshire decided not to re-engage Arnold for the 1939 season. However, the county had second thoughts and he ultimately returned for the 1939 season. Despite him missing Hampshire's opening two fixtures through a foot injury, the decision to re-engage Arnold proved to be a good one. Playing in 27 matches in 1939, he scored 1,467 runs at an average of 34.11, which placed him top of Hampshire's batting averages for the season. It was during the 1939 season that he made his third-highest first-class score, with an unbeaten 179 from the middle order against Worcestershire.

First-class cricket was suspended due to the outbreak of the Second World War in September 1939. He continued to play in friendly matches in Southampton during the war, such as playing for a team called The Rest against Deanery, of the Southampton Cricket League, in 1940. Following the war, he returned to play first-class cricket for Hampshire and showed the same pre-war form. He played in 28 matches in 1946, scoring 1,692 runs at an average of 35.25, whilst in 1947 he 1,783 runs at an average of 41.46; in the latter season, he scored five centuries and narrowly missed out on a second career double-century when he made 195 against Gloucestershire, with Arnold also sharing in a third wicket partnership of 223 with Neil McCorkell (101) whilst compiling his score. In both 1948 and 1949, Arnold passed a thousand runs for the season, but with batting averages of 27.41 in 1948 and 29.51 in 1949. He fell ill during the 1950 season and retired without playing again, having scored 1,119 runs from 18 matches at an average of 41.44, topping the Hampshire batting averages by July.

==== Playing style and statistics ====
Considered by Harry Altham, John Arlott and Desmond Eagar to have been "the county's outstanding player of the 1930s", he was by nature an attacking batsman. Despite having a naturally attacking playing style, Arnold could be versatile in his batting approach. During the middle of his career he adopted a more defensive game, but later in his career he returned to the more aggressive approach with which he had begun his career. Arnold was noted by Wisden to have been a fine off driver and hooker, who was particularly effective with his aggressive batting against off spinners and inswinging bowlers. As befitted a professional footballer, he was known for his speed whilst running between the wickets. In 396 first-class matches for Hampshire, he scored 21,596 runs at an average of 32.92; he made 36 centuries and 116 half centuries. Referred as "a joy to watch in the outfield by Wisden, Arnold took 181 catches for Hampshire. A very occasional right-arm slow bowler, he took 17 wickets in first-class cricket.

==== Umpiring career ====
Following his retirement from playing, Arnold stood as an umpire in a first-class match between Hampshire and Oxford University in 1951. Ten-years later he was added to the first-class umpires list, being joined by former cricketer and footballer Jim Hammond. He stood as an umpire in 273 first-class matches from 1961 to 1972, in addition to standing in 68 List A one-day matches. Following the end of the 1972 season, he retired from the first-class umpires list, leaving the list alongside Freddie Jakeman who was not reappointed.

=== Football career ===
Arnold began playing football as a schoolboy in Oxford. He began his career at Oxford City in the Isthmian League, but signed for Southampton in 1928 as he had to be resident in Hampshire in order to qualify to play cricket for the county. When he was first spotted playing by Southampton manager Arthur Chadwick, he is reputed to have remarked "I have a star here". Playing as an outside left, he made 110 appearances between 1928 and 1933, scoring 46 goals. He created a Southampton record during the 1931–32 season when he scored 21 goals from the left-wing.

In February 1933, he signed for Fulham. His move to Fulham was a double-transfer, with Michael Keeping also moving to Fulham alongside him. The pair cost Fulham £5,000, which helped to keep Southampton financially afloat. A month into his move to Fulham, he won one international cap for England in 1932–33, which came in the British Home Championship game against Scotland at Hampden Park, which England lost 2–1. He was not selected to play for England again following the match. By representing England at international level in football two years after his appearance for England in Test cricket, he became one of twelve Englishmen to have played both international cricket and football. He played for Fulham until the outbreak of the Second World War, having made 213 appearances and scored 62 goals. He played for Fulham in wartime matches, but did not return to play official matches for the club following the war.

== Personal life and death ==
Arnold married Gladys Collins, the niece of the Leeds United footballer Ernie Hart, at Southampton in February 1939. He remained in the Southampton area during the Second World War and was involved with the National Fire Service. Following the war, he ran The Criterion public house in St Mary's Road in Southampton from 1946 to the early 1950s. Arnold died in a Southampton hospital on 3 April 1984.

== See also ==
- One-Test wonder
