= Bill Adams (footballer, born 1902) =

English footballer

Personal information
- Full name: William Adams
- Date of birth: 3 November 1902
- Place of birth: Tynemouth, England
- Date of death: 15 March 1963 (aged 60)
- Place of death: Southampton, England
- Height: 5 ft 9 in (1.75 m)
- Position: Half-back

Youth career
- Sunderland Colliery

Senior career*
Years	Team	Apps	(Gls)
1925–1926	Guildford United	16	(0)
1926–1936	Southampton	196	(3)
1936–1937	West Ham United	3	(1)
1937	Southend United	13	(0)
- * Club domestic league appearances and goals

William Adams (3 November 1902 – 15 March 1963) was an English footballer who played at right-half or right-back in the Football League for Southampton, West Ham United and Southend United in the 1920s and 1930s.

== Football career ==
Born in Tynemouth, Adams began his footballing career with Sunderland Colliery before moving south to join Guildford United. He made his debut for Southampton on 27 August 1927, but waited over three years for his next first team appearance. He went on to become club captain in the 1931–32 season, and totalled 205 league and cup appearances.

Adams joined West Ham in 1936 for a fee of £500, and scored on his debut against his old club in a 2–0 victory at The Dell on 21 November 1936. He did not stay in east London long, however, and after three league appearances transferred to Southend United in January 1937. He retired later that year to run the Half Way Inn at Chandler's Ford, where he remained for 26 years.
