= Jack Weddle =

English footballer (1905–1979)

Personal information
- Full name: John Robson Weddle
- Date of birth: 5 November 1905
- Date of death: 1979 (aged 73–74)
- Position: Centre forward

Senior career*
Years	Team	Apps	(Gls)
1938–?	Blackburn Rovers		
	Portsmouth	396	(184)

Managerial career
- 1950s-1960s: Blackburn Rovers
- * Club domestic league appearances and goals

John Robson Weddle (5 November 1905 – 1979) was an English footballer who played for Portsmouth as a centre forward during the interwar and post war period. He is best remembered for Portsmouth's Cup run in the 1933–34 season, scoring a hat-trick against Birmingham in front of a 66,000-strong crowd to take Portsmouth to the Final.

== Career ==
He signed with Blackburn Rovers in 1938 where they lost the War Cup against West Ham United with a 1–0 defeat.

He later became the coach at Blackburn Rovers, where he remained for many years. He was the coach during the legendary FA Cup final in 1960, when Dave Whelan broke his left shin, it was rumoured that Jack Weddle helped Whelan to receive his compensation money, which he then went on to build up his JJB empire with. Jack Weddle is remembered with fond memories, such as his legendary words to Whelan before that 1960 match, when Whelan was so nervous he inquired as to where his shin pads were, to which Jack Weddle replied, "You've got 'em on, you daft bugger".

He remains to this day one of Portsmouth's most capped played with a total of 396 appearances and 184 goals. He was 'Steamboat Weddle' by Portsmouth fans due to his attacking skills, and when there was a lull in play chants were heard to "Give it to Weddle".

== Personal life ==
Weddle fathered a son, David John Weddle, and later in life had 3 grandchildren: Jane Weddle, Michael Weddle and Peter Weddle. He played Cricket for Whitburn every summer.

== Honours ==
Portsmouth

- FA Cup runner-up: 1928–29, 1933–34
