= 1929–30 Southampton F.C. season =

English football club season

Southampton F.C.
1929–30 season
- Chairman: Sloane Stanley
- Manager: Arthur Chadwick
- Stadium: The Dell
- Second Division: 7th
- FA Cup: Third round
- Top goalscorer: League: Dick Rowley (25); All: Dick Rowley (26)
- Highest home attendance: 25,934 v Tottenham Hotspur (26 December 1929)
- Lowest home attendance: 4,881 v Millwall (3 March 1930)
- Average home league attendance: 12,786
- Biggest win: 5–0 v Nottingham Forest (28 September 1929)
- Biggest defeat: 0–4 v Stoke City (19 October 1929); 1–5 v Blackpool (4 January 1930); 1–5 v West Bromwich Albion (3 May 1930)
Home colours

The 1929–30 season was the 35th season of competitive football by Southampton, and the club's eighth in the Second Division of the Football League. After finishing fourth in the Second Division the previous season – their highest position in the league to date – Southampton continued their efforts towards achieving promotion to the First Division, but finished three places lower in seventh. The club struggled at the beginning of the league campaign, remaining in the bottom half of the table due to a run of poor results. A period of form including six wins in eight games followed between September and November, enabling the Saints to move up as high as third place. The team remained in the top half of the Second Division table for most of the rest of the season, finishing in seventh place with 17 wins, 11 draws and 14 losses.

In the 1929–30 FA Cup, Southampton entered in the third round away to divisional rivals Bradford City, losing 4–1 to face elimination at the first hurdle for the third consecutive season (their worst run in the season since being knocked out of the first round in 1912, 1913 and 1914). The club ended their season as usual with two fixtures against local rivals Portsmouth, for the Hampshire Benevolent Cup and the Rowland Hospital Cup. The former (played at Fratton Park) ended in a goalless draw, while the latter (played at The Dell) ended in a 2–0 win for the travelling Pompey side. The Saints also played five friendly matches during the 1929–30 season, drawing with Aldershot Town in September, beating Corinthian in February, and drawing with a Salisbury District XI, beating Andover and losing to a Royal Air Force side in April.

Southampton used 28 different players during the 1929–30 season and had thirteen different goalscorers. Their top scorer was centre-forward Dick Rowley, who scored 25 goals in 25 appearances in the Second Division, and the club's only goal in the FA Cup. Willie Haines, the club's top scorer the previous season, ranked second with 15 goals in the league, followed by Johnny Arnold on seven league goals. Nine players were signed by the club during the campaign, with eight released and sold to other clubs. The average attendance at The Dell during the 1929–30 season was 12,786. The highest attendance was 25,934 against Tottenham Hotspur on Boxing Day 1929, which surpassed the last season's new league record of 24,247. The lowest attendance of the season was 4,881 against Millwall on 3 March 1930.

== Background and transfers ==
Several players left Southampton at the end of the 1928–29 season. In May, inside-forward Tommy Taylor joined Welsh side Rhyl Athletic, while centre-forward Douglas Vernon – signed as an emergency replacement for Willie Haines in February – was recalled by the Royal Air Force. In June, the club sold outside-left Billy Murphy to fellow Second Division club Oldham Athletic, with fellow winger Reg Watson moving the other way as part of the deal. Also in June, the Saints signed inside-forward Bill Fraser from Aldershot Town in an "unusually complicated deal" including an initial payment of £60, another £200 from a friendly match between the two sides, £50 if he made 20 appearances for the first team during the season (which he did not), and a 5% share of any future transfer fee. The following month, inside-left Charlie Petrie and Scottish centre-forward Archie Waterston both moved to the Third Division North – the former joined York City, while the latter joined Tranmere Rovers. In August, Southampton brought in two more players – inside-right Oswald Littler joined from Rochdale (after a Football Association suspension for the player was lifted upon appeal by the club), and full-back Arthur Roberts signed from Ardsley Athletic.

Transfer activity continued during the course of the season. In September 1929, the Saints Supporters Club raised £400 to sign Scottish inside-left Peter Dougall (as well as teammate William Hood) from Clyde, with an additional £50 to be paid should either player make six appearances for the club. In October, recent amateur signing Ernie Warren left the club to sign another amateur deal with Southwick, although by March 1930 he had returned to sign for the Saints as a professional. The most significant transfer of the season came in February, when the campaign's top scorer Dick Rowley was sold to Tottenham Hotspur for a fee of £3,750, the club's second highest transfer fee to date after the £3,860 received for Bill Rawlings two years earlier. In March the club signed forward Thomas Groves from Blakenall and Scottish half-back Alex Sharp from Ayr United, with Warren also returning on professional terms. Just before the end of the season, Oswald Littler left Southampton to join Southern League side Guildford City.

Players transferred in

Name	Nationality	Pos.	Club	Date	Fee	Ref.
Bill Fraser	England	FW	(England) Aldershot Town	June 1929	£260+	
Reg Watson	England	FW	(England) Oldham Athletic	June 1929	Exchange	
Oswald Littler	England	FW	(England) Rochdale	August 1929	Unknown	
Arthur Roberts	England	FB	(England) Ardsley Athletic	August 1929	Unknown	
Peter Dougall	Scotland	FW	(Scotland) Clyde	September 1929	£450	
William Hood	England	unknown	(Scotland) Clyde	September 1929	£450	
Thomas Groves	England	FW	(England) Blakenall	March 1930	Free (Note: Thomas Groves initially joined on amateur terms in March 1930, before turning professional that May.)	
Alex Sharp	Scotland	HB	(Scotland) Ayr United	March 1930	Free	
Ernie Warren	England	FW	(England) Southwick	March 1930	Unknown	

Players transferred out

Name	Nationality	Pos.	Club	Date	Fee	Ref.
Tommy Taylor	England	FW	(Wales) Rhyl Athletic	May 1929	Unknown	
Douglas Vernon	England	FW	(England) Royal Air Force	May 1929	Unknown	
Billy Murphy	England	FW	(England) Oldham Athletic	June 1929	Exchange	
Charlie Petrie	England	FW	(England) York City	July 1929	Unknown	
Archie Waterston	Scotland	FW	(England) Tranmere Rovers	July 1929	Unknown	
Ernie Warren	England	FW	(England) Southwick	October 1929	Free	
Dick Rowley	Ireland	FW	(England) Tottenham Hotspur	February 1930	£3,750	
Oswald Littler	England	FW	(England) Guildford City	April 1930	Unknown	

== Second Division ==
Southampton began the 1929–30 Second Division campaign against Barnsley, who had finished the previous season just four points above relegation. During the game, Jerry Mackie became the first Southampton player to be sent off since James Moore in December 1920, as the Saints lost 3–1 and started off in the bottom half of the Second Division league table. A 2–2 draw with Hull City was followed by home wins over Blackpool and West Bromwich Albion, which helped the Saints move up to seventh in the league. Dick Rowley quickly established himself as the season's top scorer with consecutive hat-tricks against Chelsea and Nottingham Forest in late September, the latter of which was a 5–0 away win, and later became the first Southampton player to score four goals in an away match when they beat Bradford City 5–2 on 2 November. A week later the club reached third in the Second Division table, their highest position of the season, after having picked up six wins in eight fixtures.

The 5–2 win over Bradford City was Southampton's last away win of the season until April, with their poor form on the road holding back their hopes of promotion to the top flight. Three losses and two draws saw the club drop to tenth in the table by mid-December, although by the end of the year they had returned to the top four following three more wins. The home win over Tottenham Hotspur on 26 December was a new league record attendance at The Dell of 25,934. After Rowley was sold to Spurs in February, the club struggled to continue scoring and ultimately dropped too many points to remain in the fight for promotion. In March the club won just one game, a 2–1 home win over Bradford City, although managed to remain in the top seven of the league. Three wins out of six in April helped them move up to sixth, although a pair of thrashings at the hands of Charlton Athletic and West Bromwich Albion saw them drop back to seventh, where they finished with 17 wins, 11 draws and 14 losses.

=== List of match results ===
31 August 1929 1	Barnsley	3–1	Southampton	Barnsley
			Haines	Stadium: Oakwell; Attendance: 5,000

2 September 1929 2	Southampton	2–2	Hull City	Southampton
	Weale; Haines			Stadium: The Dell; Attendance: 11,419

7 September 1929 3	Southampton	4–2	Blackpool	Southampton
	Watson; Coates; Rowley			Stadium: The Dell; Attendance: 9,838

9 September 1929 4	Southampton	3–2	West Bromwich Albion	Southampton
	Rowley; Weale			Stadium: The Dell; Attendance: 20,035

14 September 1929 5	Bury	4–2	Southampton	Bury
			Rowley; Watson	Stadium: Gigg Lane; Attendance: 14,000

16 September 1929 6	Hull City	2–0	Southampton	Kingston upon Hull
				Stadium: Anlaby Road; Attendance: 7,115

21 September 1929 7	Southampton	4–2	Chelsea	Southampton
	Rowley; Cribb			Stadium: The Dell; Attendance: 16,569

28 September 1929 8	Nottingham Forest	0–5	Southampton	West Bridgford
			Rowley; Littler	Stadium: City Ground; Attendance: 7,000

5 October 1929 9	Southampton	2–0	Oldham Athletic	Southampton
	Rowley; Coates			Stadium: The Dell; Attendance: 17,600

12 October 1929 10	Millwall	1–1	Southampton	London
			Harkus	Stadium: The Den; Attendance: 20,000

19 October 1929 11	Stoke City	4–0	Southampton	Stoke-on-Trent
				Stadium: Victoria Ground; Attendance: 12,000

26 October 1929 12	Southampton	3–1	Wolverhampton Wanderers	Southampton
	Rowley; Arnold			Stadium: The Dell; Attendance: 13,308

2 November 1929 13	Bradford City	2–5	Southampton	Bradford
			Rowley; Coates	Stadium: Valley Parade; Attendance: 14,000

9 November 1929 14	Southampton	2–1	Swansea Town	Southampton
	Rowley; Arnold			Stadium: The Dell; Attendance: 16,600

16 November 1929 15	Cardiff City	5–2	Southampton	Cardiff
			Rowley; Littler	Stadium: Ninian Park; Attendance: 12,000

23 November 1929 16	Southampton	1–2	Preston North End	Southampton
	Rowley			Stadium: The Dell; Attendance: 10,110

30 November 1929 17	Bristol City	3–1	Southampton	Bristol
			Watson	Stadium: Ashton Gate Stadium; Attendance: 9,000

7 December 1929 18	Southampton	2–2	Notts County	Southampton
	Rowley; Coates			Stadium: The Dell; Attendance: 9,235

14 December 1929 19	Reading	1–1	Southampton	Reading
			Cribb	Stadium: Elm Park; Attendance: 10,000

21 December 1929 20	Southampton	2–0	Charlton Athletic	Southampton
	Jepson; Cribb			Stadium: The Dell; Attendance: 10,161

25 December 1929 21	Tottenham Hotspur	3–2	Southampton	London
			Cribb	Stadium: White Hart Lane; Attendance: 26,564

26 December 1929 22	Southampton	1–0	Tottenham Hotspur	Southampton
	Rowley			Stadium: The Dell; Attendance: 25,934

28 December 1929 23	Southampton	4–0	Barnsley	Southampton
	Rowley; Keeping; Weale			Stadium: The Dell; Attendance: 8,168

4 January 1930 24	Blackpool	5–1	Southampton	Blackpool
			Rowley	Stadium: Bloomfield Road; Attendance: 10,000

18 January 1930 25	Southampton	0–0	Bury	Southampton
				Stadium: The Dell; Attendance: 12,293

25 January 1930 26	Chelsea	2–0	Southampton	London
				Stadium: Stamford Bridge; Attendance: 25,000

1 February 1930 27	Southampton	2–0	Nottingham Forest	Southampton
	Weale; Haines			Stadium: The Dell; Attendance: 9,921

8 February 1930 28	Oldham Athletic	3–2	Southampton	Oldham
			Haines	Stadium: Boundary Park; Attendance: 15,000

22 February 1930 29	Southampton	2–1	Stoke City	Southampton
	Haines			Stadium: The Dell; Attendance: 10,924

1 March 1930 30	Wolverhampton Wanderers	2–0	Southampton	Wolverhampton
				Stadium: Molineux Stadium; Attendance: 12,000

3 March 1930 31	Southampton	0–0	Millwall	Southampton
				Stadium: The Dell; Attendance: 4,881

8 March 1930 32	Southampton	2–1	Bradford City	Southampton
	Mackie; Arnold			Stadium: The Dell; Attendance: 11,091

15 March 1930 33	Swansea Town	2–2	Southampton	Swansea
			Mackie; Arnold	Stadium: Vetch Field; Attendance: 7,000

22 March 1930 34	Southampton	1–1	Cardiff City	Southampton
	Haines			Stadium: The Dell; Attendance: 14,000

29 March 1930 35	Preston North End	1–1	Southampton	Preston
			Haines	Stadium: Deepdale; Attendance: 6,000

5 April 1930 36	Southampton	3–0	Bristol City	Southampton
	Jepson; Haines; Dougall			Stadium: The Dell; Attendance: 9,788

12 April 1930 37	Notts County	1–2	Southampton	Nottingham
			Jepson; Haines	Stadium: Meadow Lane; Attendance: 10,500

19 April 1930 38	Southampton	4–2	Reading	Southampton
	Haines; Jepson; Arnold			Stadium: The Dell; Attendance: 11,346

21 April 1930 39	Southampton	2–2	Bradford Park Avenue	Southampton
	Mackie; Arnold			Stadium: The Dell; Attendance: 15,302

22 April 1930 40	Bradford Park Avenue	1–1	Southampton	Bradford
			Haines	Stadium: Park Avenue; Attendance: 10,038

26 April 1930 41	Charlton Athletic	4–1	Southampton	London
			Haines	Stadium: The Valley; Attendance: 8,000

3 May 1930 42	West Bromwich Albion	5–1	Southampton	West Bromwich
			Arnold	Stadium: The Hawthorns; Attendance: 10,000

=== Final league table ===
Pos	Team	Pld	W	D	L	GF	GA	GAv	Pts
5	Bury	42	22	5	15	78	67	1.164	49
6	West Bromwich Albion	42	21	5	16	105	73	1.438	47
7	Southampton	42	17	11	14	77	76	1.013	45
8	Cardiff City	42	18	8	16	61	59	1.034	44
9	Wolverhampton Wanderers	42	16	9	17	77	79	0.975	41

Rules for classification: 1) Points; 2) Goal average; 3) Goals scored

=== Results by matchday ===
Round	1	2	3	4	5	6	7	8	9	10	11	12	13	14	15	16	17	18	19	20	21	22	23	24	25	26	27	28	29	30	31	32	33	34	35	36	37	38	39	40	41	42
Ground	A	H	H	H	A	A	H	A	H	A	A	H	A	H	A	H	A	H	A	H	A	H	H	A	H	A	H	A	H	A	H	H	A	H	A	H	A	H	H	A	A	A
Result	L	D	W	W	L	L	W	W	W	D	L	W	W	W	L	L	L	D	D	W	L	W	W	L	D	L	W	L	W	L	D	W	D	D	D	W	W	W	D	D	L	L
Position	16	15	10	7	12	14	10	9	6	6	11	8	4	3	7	9	9	9	10	8	8	7	4	9	8	8	6	7	7	8	8	8	8	7	7	6	5	6	6	6	7	7

Source: 11v11.com
A = Away; H = Home; W = Win; D = Draw; L = Loss

== FA Cup ==
Southampton entered the 1929–30 FA Cup in the third round against Second Division rivals Bradford City, who they had recently beaten 5–2 in the league. The Saints were described by club historians as being in poor form defensively, with "an awful defensive mix-up" leading to an opening goal for the hosts. Dick Rowley equalised later, but Bradford were able to score three more goals and advance. Southampton's elimination marked the third consecutive season in which they had failed to win a game in the FA Cup – their worst run since the three seasons between 1911–12 and 1913–14.

11 January 1930 Round 3	Bradford City	4–1	Southampton	Bradford
			Rowley	Stadium: Valley Parade; Attendance: 25,000

== Other matches ==
Outside of the league and the FA Cup, Southampton played seven additional first-team matches during the 1929–30 season. The first was a friendly match against Southern League side Aldershot Town on 25 September, which ended in a 3–3 draw. Goals for the Saints were scored by Dick Rowley (two) and Johnny Arnold. The club hosted amateur side Corinthian in February, winning 2–0 thanks to a brace from Willie Haines. Three more friendlies followed in April. The first, against a Salisbury District XI, ended in a 2–2 draw with Bill Fraser and Jerry Mackie scoring for Southampton; the second was a 6–1 thrashing of Hampshire League side Andover, with goals scored by Haines (three), Fraser (two) and Arnold; and the third was a 1–0 loss at a Royal Air Force team.

The club ended the season with two games against local rivals Portsmouth, in the annual Hampshire Benevolent Cup and Rowland Hospital Cup fixtures. The former game took place at Fratton Park on 5 May and ended goalless, with both sides dominating a half each according to the Southern Daily Echo. Two days later, Southampton hosted Pompey in the Rowland Hospital Cup. The First Division visitors won the match 2–0 thanks to a pair of goals from centre-forward Methuen, although the Evening News admitted that Portsmouth were "somewhat lucky to win".

25 September 1925 Friendly	Aldershot Town	3–3	Southampton	Aldershot
			Rowley; Arnold	Stadium: Recreation Ground

15 February 1930 Friendly	Southampton	2–0	Corinthian	Southampton
	Haines			Stadium: The Dell

9 April 1930 Friendly	Salisbury District XI	2–2	Southampton	Salisbury
			Fraser; Mackie

16 April 1930 Friendly	Andover	6–1	Southampton	Andover
			Haines; Fraser; Arnold	Stadium: Walled Meadow

28 April 1930 Friendly	Royal Air Force	1–0	Southampton

5 May 1930 Hampshire BC	Portsmouth	0–0	Southampton	Portsmouth
				Stadium: Fratton Park; Attendance: 4,240; Referee: Gibbs

7 May 1930 Rowland Hospital Cup	Southampton	0–2	Portsmouth	Southampton
			Methuen	Stadium: The Dell; Referee: Gibbs

== Player details ==
Southampton used 28 different players during the 1929–30 season, 13 of whom scored during the campaign. The team played in a 2–3–5 formation throughout, using two full-backs, three half-backs, two outside forwards, two inside forwards and a centre-forward. Goalkeeper Willie White made the most appearances for the club during the campaign, missing only two league games and the FA Cup fixture. Left-back Michael Keeping played in all but three league games and both end-of-season games. Centre-forward Dick Rowley finished as the season's top scorer with 25 goals in the Second Division and one in the cup, despite leaving the club four three months before the end of the season. Willie Haines, who took Rowley's place in the side after his departure, scored 15 goals in the league, while Johnny Arnold scored seven.

=== Squad statistics ===
Name	Pos.	Nat.	League		FA Cup		Other (Note: "Other" includes the Rowland Hospital Cup and Hampshire Benevolent Cup matches.)		Total	
Name	Pos.	Nat.	Apps.	Gls.	Apps.	Gls.	Apps.	Gls.	Apps.	Gls.
Bill Adams	HB	(England)	0	0	0	0	1	0	1	0
Johnny Arnold	FW	(England)	18	7	0	0	1	0	19	7
Arthur Bradford	HB	(England)	33	0	1	0	2	0	36	0
Herbert Coates	FW	(England)	25	4	1	0	2	0	28	4
Stan Cribb	FW	(England)	11	5	1	0	0	0	12	5
Peter Dougall	FW	(Scotland)	12	1	0	0	0	0	12	1
Bill Fraser	FW	(England)	10	0	0	0	2	0	12	0
Thomas Groves	FW	(England)	0	0	0	0	1	0	1	0
Willie Haines	FW	(England)	19	15	0	0	0	0	19	15
George Harkus	HB	(England)	30	1	0	0	0	0	30	1
Ted Hough	FB	(England)	21	0	0	0	2	0	23	0
Bert Jepson	FW	(England)	14	4	0	0	0	0	14	4
Michael Keeping	FB	(England)	39	1	1	0	0	0	40	1
Bill Luckett	HB	(England)	12	0	1	0	0	0	13	0
Jerry Mackie	FW	(Scotland)	20	3	1	0	1	0	22	3
A. Newman (Note: A player named "A. Newman" is listed in the lineups for the Hampshire Benevolent Cup and Rowland Hospital Cup matches, however no first name is given.)	FW	(England)	0	0	0	0	2	0	2	0
Alex Sharp	HB	(Scotland)	1	0	0	0	0	0	1	0
Bert Shelley	HB	(England)	11	0	0	0	1	0	12	0
Bill Stoddart	HB	(England)	8	0	1	0	2	0	11	0
George Thompson	GK	(England)	2	0	1	0	0	0	3	0
Ernie Warren	FW	(England)	1	0	0	0	0	0	1	0
Reg Watson	FW	(England)	14	4	0	0	1	0	15	4
Bobby Weale	FW	(Wales)	27	4	1	0	0	0	28	4
Willie White	GK	(Scotland)	40	0	0	0	2	0	42	0
Arthur Wilson	HB	(England)	24	0	1	0	0	0	25	0
Stan Woodhouse	HB	(England)	33	0	0	0	2	0	35	0
Players with appearances who left before the end of the season
Oswald Littler	FW	(England)	12	3	0	0	0	0	12	3
Dick Rowley	FW	(Republic of Ireland)	25	25	1	1	0	0	26	26

=== Most appearances ===
Rank	Name	Pos.	League		FA Cup		Other		Total	
Rank	Name	Pos.	Apps.	%	Apps.	%	Apps.	%	Apps.	%
1	Willie White	GK	40	95.24	0	0.00	2	100.00	42	93.33
2	Michael Keeping	FB	39	92.86	1	100.00	0	0.00	40	88.89
3	Arthur Bradford	HB	33	78.57	1	100.00	2	100.00	36	80.00
4	Stan Woodhouse	HB	33	78.57	0	0.00	2	100.00	35	77.78
5	George Harkus	HB	30	71.43	0	0.00	0	0.00	30	66.67
6	Bobby Weale	FW	27	64.29	1	100.00	0	0.00	28	62.22
6	Herbert Coates	FW	25	59.52	1	100.00	2	100.00	28	62.22
8	Dick Rowley	FW	25	59.52	1	100.00	0	0.00	26	57.78
9	Arthur Wilson	FW	24	57.14	1	100.00	0	0.00	25	55.56
10	Ted Hough	FB	21	0.50	0	0.00	2	100.00	23	51.11

=== Top goalscorers ===
Rank	Name	Pos.	League		FA Cup		Other		Total	
Rank	Name	Pos.	Gls.	GPG	Gls.	GPG	Gls.	GPG	Gls.	GPG
1	Dick Rowley	FW	25	1.00	1	1.00	0	0.00	26	1.00
2	Willie Haines	FW	15	0.78	0	0.00	0	0.00	15	0.78
3	Johnny Arnold	FW	7	0.38	0	0.00	0	0.00	7	0.36
4	Stan Cribb	FW	5	0.45	0	0.00	0	0.00	5	0.41
5	Bert Jepson	FW	4	0.28	0	0.00	0	0.00	4	0.28
5	Reg Watson	FW	4	0.28	0	0.00	0	0.00	4	0.26
5	Herbert Coates	FW	4	0.16	0	0.00	0	0.00	4	0.14
5	Bobby Weale	FW	4	0.14	0	0.00	0	0.00	4	0.14
9	Oswald Littler	FW	3	0.25	0	0.00	0	0.00	3	0.25
9	Jerry Mackie	FW	3	0.15	0	0.00	0	0.00	3	0.13

== Bibliography ==
- Chalk, Gary; Holley, Duncan (10 August 1987), A Complete Record of Southampton Football Club: 1885–1987, Derby, England: Breedon Books, ISBN 978-0907969228
- Chalk, Gary; Holley, Duncan; Bull, David (28 November 2013), All the Saints: A Complete Who's Who of Southampton FC, Bristol, England: Hagiology Publishing, ISBN 978-0992686406
- Juson, Dave; Aldworth, Clay; Bendel, Barry; Bull, David; Chalk, Gary (10 November 2004), Saints v Pompey: A History of Unrelenting Rivalry, Bristol, England: Hagiology Publishing, ISBN 978-0953447459
