= 1928–29 Southampton F.C. season =

English football club season

Southampton F.C.
1928–29 season
- Chairman: Wyndham Portal
- Manager: Arthur Chadwick
- Stadium: The Dell
- Second Division: 4th
- FA Cup: Third round
- Top goalscorer: League: Willie Haines (16); All: Willie Haines (16)
- Highest home attendance: 24,247 v Chelsea (9 March 1929)
- Lowest home attendance: 6,510 v Swansea Town (4 May 1929)
- Average home league attendance: 15,164
- Biggest win: 8–2 v Blackpool (3 November 1928)
- Biggest defeat: 0–3 and 1–4 (multiple)
Home colours

The 1928–29 season was the 34th season of competitive football by Southampton, and the club's seventh in the Second Division of the Football League. After finishing in the bottom half of the Second Division league table the last three seasons, the club returned to challenging for promotion to the First Division when they finished fourth, their highest position in the league to date. The team were strong throughout the campaign, picking up key wins over teams around them in the table to secure a strong position. They stayed in the top six of the league for most of the campaign from September, reaching third place on two occasions and dropping to seventh just twice. Southampton finished the season in fourth place with 17 wins, 14 draws and 11 losses, five points behind Grimsby Town in the first promotion place.

In the 1928–29 FA Cup, Southampton entered in the third round at home to divisional rivals Clapton Orient. After a goalless draw at The Dell, the sides played a replay at Clapton Stadium which the hosts won 2–1, eliminating the Saints at the first hurdle for the third time in four seasons. The club ended the 1928–29 season with two games against local rivals Portsmouth, for the Rowland Hospital Cup and the Hampshire Benevolent Cup. The Saints won both games, the former 2–1 at Fratton Park and the latter 3–2 at The Dell, marking the first time they had won both tournaments in a season. Southampton also played three friendly matches during the season, all in April 1929, beating Southern League side Guildford City, Wiltshire County League side Warminster Town and Dorset League side Wimborne Town.

Southampton used 25 different players during the 1928–29 season and had 14 different goalscorers. Their top scorer was centre-forward Willie Haines, who scored 16 goals in the Second Division. Outside-left Stan Cribb scored 13 times in the league, followed by inside-right Jerry Mackie with ten goals. Twelve players were signed by the club during the campaign, with seven released and sold to other clubs. The average attendance at The Dell during the 1928–29 season was 15,164. The highest attendance was 24,247 against Chelsea on 9 March 1929, which set a new league record for the stadium. The lowest attendance of the season was 6,510 against Swansea Town on 4 May 1929, in the last league game of the season. After the last game, the East Stand of The Dell burned down and had to be rebuilt.

== Background and transfers ==
Southampton conducted a large amount of transfer activity throughout the 1928–29 season. The club's first signing in the summer was Portsmouth centre-forward Willie Haines, who joined from the First Division side having scored 119 goals in 164 league appearances. In June, Southampton manager Arthur Chadwick brought in centre-half Bill Stoddart from Third Division South side Coventry City, trading mainstay goalkeeper Tommy Allen and outside-right Bill Henderson for his services. Two months later, Scottish goalkeeper Willie White was signed from Heart of Midlothian as Allen's replacement, costing the Saints £800. In June, outside-right Cuthbert Coundon was sold to Wolverhampton Wanderers for £150, and inside-left Sam Taylor joined Halifax Town in the Third Division North. Right-back James Ellison left the Saints for Rochdale in July. In August, the club signed outside-right Bert Jepson from Huddersfield Town, as well as trialist Tom Sloan from Craghead United (he left a month later).

Transfers continued throughout the season for Southampton. In September the club signed outside-left Johnny Arnold from Oxford City, and in October they brought in inside-left Herbert Coates from the Royal Navy. Before the end of the year the club also signed Newport County centre-forward Archie Waterston, and broke their transfer record with the £1,000 signing of outside-right Bobby Weale from Swindon Town. Due to ongoing injury problems for his side's regular centre-forward Haines, in February 1929 Chadwick brought in former Royal Air Force aircraftsman Douglas Vernon to help with the end of season run-in. The final signings of the season were goalkeeper Bert Scriven from Totton and inside-left Ernie Warren from Third Division North side Lincoln City in March 1929. During the season, "big offers" had also been made by various clubs to sign players including Ted Hough, Arthur Bradford, Stan Cribb and Dick Rowley, although the club's directors had "wisely resisted" them.

Players transferred in

| Name | Nationality | Pos. | Club | Date | Fee | Ref. |
|---|---|---|---|---|---|---|
| Willie Haines | England | FW | (England) Portsmouth | May 1928 | Unknown | |
| Bill Stoddart | England | HB | (England) Coventry City | June 1928 | Exchange | |
| Willie White | Scotland | GK | (Scotland) Heart of Midlothian | July 1928 | £800 | |
| Bert Jepson | England | FW | (England) Huddersfield Town | August 1928 | Unknown | |
| Johnny Arnold | England | FW | (England) Oxford City | September 1928 | Unknown | |
| Herbert Coates | England | FW | (England) Royal Navy | October 1928 | Free (Note: Herbert Coates initially joined on amateur terms.) | |
| Archie Waterston | Scotland | FW | (Wales) Newport County | December 1928 | Unknown | |
| Bobby Weale | Wales | FW | (England) Swindon Town | December 1928 | £1,000 | |
| Douglas Vernon | England | FW | (England) Royal Air Force | February 1929 | Unknown | |
| Bert Scriven | England | GK | (England) Totton | March 1929 | Free (Note: Bert Scriven initially joined on amateur terms in March 1929, before turning professional that December.) | |
| Ernie Warren | England | FW | (England) Lincoln City | March 1929 | Free (Note: Ernie Warren initially joined on amateur terms in March 1929, before leaving that October.) | |

Players transferred out

| Name | Nationality | Pos. | Club | Date | Fee | Ref. |
|---|---|---|---|---|---|---|
| Tommy Allen | England | GK | (England) Coventry City | June 1928 | Exchange | |
| Cuthbert Coundon | England | FW | (England) Wolverhampton Wanderers | June 1928 | £150 | |
| Bill Henderson | England | FW | (England) Coventry City | June 1928 | Exchange | |
| Sam Taylor | England | FW | (England) Halifax Town | June 1928 | £300 | |
| James Ellison | England | FB | (England) Rochdale | July 1928 | Unknown | |

Players released

| Name | Nationality | Pos. | Date | Subsequent club | Ref. |
|---|---|---|---|---|---|
| Jack Mitton | England | FW | May 1928 | Amateur clubs | |

Players given trials

| Name | Nationality | Pos. | Club | Start date | End date | Ref. |
|---|---|---|---|---|---|---|
| Tom Sloan | England | FW | (England) Craghead United | August 1928 | September 1928 | |

== Second Division ==
After a slow start to the 1928–29 season in which they picked up just two points in their opening three fixtures, Southampton won five games in a row to secure a top five place in the table by the end of September. The run included a 2–1 defeat of recently relegated side Middlesbrough, home and away wins over Port Vale, and a 4–0 besting of Preston North End, who had finished just four points shy of promotion to the First Division the previous season. A largely winless run followed starting on 6 October, during which time the Saints picked up ten draws in thirteen games. The club's only win during this period was an 8–2 thrashing of Blackpool at The Dell, who had avoided relegation by just one point the previous year. Half of Southampton's goals against the Seasiders were scored by recent signing Willie Haines, who in doing so became the first player for the club to score more than three in a Second Division match. After two more wins, Southampton found themselves in fourth place at the end of the year.

Despite winning just one of their three matches during the month, in January the Saints moved up to third in the table, keeping up with leaders Chelsea and Middlesbrough. 2–1 wins over struggling sides Bristol City and Wolverhampton Wanderers in February helped them to remain in the running, holding off fellow challengers Grimsby Town who were in the middle of a five-game winning run. However, the team began struggling for goals due to Haines being injured, with his replacement Douglas Vernon failing to score in his five league appearances. A string of three consecutive losses in March saw the team as low as seventh in the table, although wins over Nottingham Forest and Millwall at the tail end of the month brought them back into the top four. Southampton continued to pick up wins, but Grimsby's ongoing form saw them pull ahead of the Saints and third-placed Bradford Park Avenue; the club finished in fourth with 17 wins, 14 draws and 11 losses, five points behind the first promotion place.

=== List of match results ===
| 25 August 1928 1 | Hull City | 2–2 | Southampton | Kingston upon Hull |
| | | | Keeping; Petrie | Stadium: Anlaby Road; Attendance: 9,000 |

| 27 August 1928 2 | Southampton | 1–2 | Port Vale | Southampton |
| | Taylor | | | Stadium: The Dell; Attendance: 12,000 |

| 1 September 1928 3 | Southampton | 1–1 | Tottenham Hotspur | Southampton |
| | Taylor | | | Stadium: The Dell; Attendance: 22,961 |

| 8 September 1928 4 | Reading | 0–1 | Southampton | Reading |
| | | | Cribb | Stadium: Elm Park; Attendance: 19,000 |

| 15 September 1928 5 | Southampton | 4–0 | Preston North End | Southampton |
| | Shelley; Haines; Petrie | | | Stadium: The Dell; Attendance: 17,011 |

| 22 September 1928 6 | Middlesbrough | 1–2 | Southampton | Middlesbrough |
| | | | Haines; Cribb | Stadium: Ayresome Park; Attendance: 12,000 |

| 24 September 1928 7 | Port Vale | 1–2 | Southampton | Hanley |
| | | | Mackie | Stadium: Old Recreation Ground; Attendance: 7,344 |

| 29 September 1928 8 | Southampton | 2–1 | Oldham Athletic | Southampton |
| | Cribb | | | Stadium: The Dell; Attendance: 16,945 |

| 6 October 1928 9 | Bristol City | 1–1 | Southampton | Bristol |
| | | | Haines | Stadium: Ashton Gate Stadium; Attendance: 15,000 |

| 13 October 1928 10 | Wolverhampton Wanderers | 1–1 | Southampton | Wolverhampton |
| | | | Haines | Stadium: Molineux Stadium; Attendance: 15,000 |

| 20 October 1928 11 | Southampton | 1–2 | Barnsley | Southampton |
| | Haines | | | Stadium: The Dell; Attendance: 15,847 |

| 27 October 1928 12 | Chelsea | 1–1 | Southampton | London |
| | | | Cribb | Stadium: Stamford Bridge; Attendance: 35,000 |

| 3 November 1928 13 | Southampton | 8–2 | Blackpool | Southampton |
| | Haines; Mackie; Cribb | | | Stadium: The Dell; Attendance: 15,146 |

| 10 November 1928 14 | Nottingham Forest | 1–1 | Southampton | West Bridgford |
| | | | Rowley | Stadium: City Ground; Attendance: 5,000 |

| 17 November 1928 15 | Southampton | 2–2 | Bradford Park Avenue | Southampton |
| | Jepson; Rowley | | | Stadium: The Dell; Attendance: 14,657 |

| 24 November 1928 16 | Grimsby Town | 2–1 | Southampton | Cleethorpes |
| | | | Rowley | Stadium: Blundell Park; Attendance: 7,000 |

| 1 December 1928 17 | Southampton | 0–0 | Stoke City | Southampton |
| | | | | Stadium: The Dell; Attendance: 14,218 |

| 8 December 1928 18 | Clapton Orient | 1–1 | Southampton | London |
| | | | Murphy | Stadium: Clapton Stadium; Attendance: 11,000 |

| 15 December 1928 19 | Southampton | 1–1 | West Bromwich Albion | Southampton |
| | Rowley | | | Stadium: The Dell; Attendance: 13,509 |

| 22 December 1928 20 | Swansea Town | 1–1 | Southampton | Swansea |
| | | | Mackie | Stadium: Vetch Field; Attendance: 5,000 |

| 25 December 1928 21 | Notts County | 1–1 | Southampton | Nottingham |
| | | | Haines | Stadium: Meadow Lane; Attendance: 21,865 |

| 26 December 1928 22 | Southampton | 4–0 | Notts County | Southampton |
| | Weale; Rowley | | | Stadium: The Dell; Attendance: 20,441 |

| 29 December 1928 23 | Southampton | 3–2 | Hull City | Southampton |
| | Weale; Waterston; Rowley | | | Stadium: The Dell; Attendance: 18,765 |

| 5 January 1929 24 | Tottenham Hotspur | 3–2 | Southampton | London |
| | | | Weale; Bradford | Stadium: White Hart Lane; Attendance: 25,000 |

| 19 January 1929 25 | Southampton | 2–2 | Reading | Southampton |
| | Coates; Cribb | | | Stadium: The Dell; Attendance: 15,775 |

| 26 January 1929 26 | Preston North End | 0–1 | Southampton | Preston |
| | | | Cribb | Stadium: Deepdale; Attendance: 11,000 |

| 2 February 1929 27 | Southampton | 1–1 | Middlesbrough | Southampton |
| | Cribb | | | Stadium: The Dell; Attendance: 13,608 |

| 9 February 1929 28 | Oldham Athletic | 3–1 | Southampton | Oldham |
| | | | Weale | Stadium: Boundary Park; Attendance: 14,000 |

| 16 February 1929 29 | Southampton | 2–1 | Bristol City | Southampton |
| | Mackie; Cribb | | | Stadium: The Dell; Attendance: 10,095 |

| 23 February 1929 30 | Southampton | 2–1 | Wolverhampton Wanderers | Southampton |
| | Mackie; Coates | | | Stadium: The Dell; Attendance: 12,478 |

| 2 March 1929 31 | Barnsley | 4–1 | Southampton | Barnsley |
| | | | Rowley | Stadium: Oakwell; Attendance: 4,000 |

| 9 March 1929 32 | Southampton | 1–2 | Chelsea | Southampton |
| | Mackie | | | Stadium: The Dell; Attendance: 24,247 |

| 16 March 1929 33 | Blackpool | 3–0 | Southampton | Blackpool |
| | | | | Stadium: Bloomfield Road; Attendance: 10,000 |

| 23 March 1929 34 | Southampton | 2–1 | Nottingham Forest | Southampton |
| | Mackie; Cribb | | | Stadium: The Dell; Attendance: 10,292 |

| 29 March 1929 35 | Millwall | 2–4 | Southampton | London |
| | | | Rowley; Jepson; Mackie | Stadium: The Den; Attendance: 21,817 |

| 30 March 1929 36 | Bradford Park Avenue | 4–1 | Southampton | Bradford |
| | | | Haines | Stadium: Park Avenue; Attendance: 11,000 |

| 1 April 1929 37 | Southampton | 3–0 | Millwall | Southampton |
| | Jepson; Haines; Coates | | | Stadium: The Dell; Attendance: 17,368 |

| 6 April 1929 38 | Southampton | 3–1 | Grimsby Town | Southampton |
| | Haines; Coates; Cribb | | | Stadium: The Dell; Attendance: 17,700 |

| 13 April 1929 39 | Stoke City | 3–0 | Southampton | Stoke-on-Trent |
| | | | | Stadium: Victoria Ground; Attendance: 11,000 |

| 20 April 1929 40 | Southampton | 2–0 | Clapton Orient | Southampton |
| | Haines; Coates | | | Stadium: The Dell; Attendance: 8,890 |

| 27 April 1929 41 | West Bromwich Albion | 3–1 | Southampton | West Bromwich |
| | | | Coates | Stadium: The Hawthorns; Attendance: 10,024 |

| 4 May 1929 42 | Southampton | 3–0 | Swansea Town | Southampton |
| | Jepson; Haines; Coates | | | Stadium: The Dell; Attendance: 6,510 |

=== Final league table ===
| Pos | Team | Pld | W | D | L | GF | GA | GAv | Pts | Promotion or relegation |
|---|---|---|---|---|---|---|---|---|---|---|
| 2 | Grimsby Town (P) | 42 | 24 | 5 | 13 | 82 | 61 | 1.344 | 53 | Promotion to the First Division |
| 3 | Bradford (Park Avenue) | 42 | 22 | 4 | 16 | 88 | 70 | 1.257 | 48 | |
| 4 | Southampton | 42 | 17 | 14 | 11 | 74 | 60 | 1.233 | 48 | |
| 5 | Notts County | 42 | 19 | 9 | 14 | 78 | 65 | 1.200 | 47 | |
| 6 | Stoke City | 42 | 17 | 12 | 13 | 74 | 51 | 1.451 | 46 | |

(P) Promoted

=== Results by matchday ===
| Round | 1 | 2 | 3 | 4 | 5 | 6 | 7 | 8 | 9 | 10 | 11 | 12 | 13 | 14 | 15 | 16 | 17 | 18 | 19 | 20 | 21 | 22 | 23 | 24 | 25 | 26 | 27 | 28 | 29 | 30 | 31 | 32 | 33 | 34 | 35 | 36 | 37 | 38 | 39 | 40 | 41 | 42 |
|---|---|---|---|---|---|---|---|---|---|---|---|---|---|---|---|---|---|---|---|---|---|---|---|---|---|---|---|---|---|---|---|---|---|---|---|---|---|---|---|---|---|---|
| Ground | A | H | H | A | H | A | A | H | A | A | H | A | H | A | H | A | H | A | H | A | A | H | H | A | H | A | H | A | H | H | A | H | A | H | A | A | H | H | A | H | A | H |
| Result | D | L | D | W | W | W | W | W | D | D | L | D | W | D | D | L | D | D | D | D | D | W | W | L | D | W | D | L | W | W | L | L | L | W | W | L | W | W | L | W | L | W |
| Position | 10 | 15 | 14 | 10 | 8 | 7 | 5 | 5 | 5 | 4 | 5 | 5 | 4 | 4 | 4 | 4 | 5 | 5 | 6 | 7 | 6 | 5 | 4 | 4 | 4 | 3 | 3 | 5 | 3 | 3 | 4 | 5 | 7 | 6 | 4 | 5 | 4 | 4 | 4 | 4 | 5 | 4 |

Source: 11v11.com
A = Away; H = Home; W = Win; D = Draw; L = Loss

== FA Cup ==
Southampton entered the 1928–29 FA Cup in the third round against fellow Second Division side Clapton Orient. Drawn at The Dell, the game ended goalless as Dick Rowley hit the post and top scorer Willie Haines had "a poor game at centre-forward". The replay at Clapton Stadium started well for the Saints, who went ahead through Arthur Bradford and almost doubled their lead courtesy of Stan Cribb. However, the hosts equalised before the end of the first half and continued to pressurise the visitors throughout the second, eventually scoring a second past deputising goalkeeper George Thompson.

| 12 January 1929 Round 3 | Southampton | 0–0 | Clapton Orient | Southampton |
| | | | | Stadium: The Dell; Attendance: 15,000 |

| 17 January 1929 Round 3 Replay | Clapton Orient | 2–1 | Southampton | London |
| | | | Bradford | Stadium: Clapton Stadium; Attendance: 10,000 |

== Other matches ==
Outside of the league and the FA Cup, Southampton played five additional first-team matches during the 1928–29 season. The first was a friendly match against Southern League side Guildford City on 17 April, which ended in a 2–1 win to the visiting Saints thanks to goals from Willie Haines and Johnny Arnold. Five days later the club played another away friendly, this time against Warminster Town of the Wiltshire County League. The Saints won comfortably 6–1, with Haines (three), Arthur Bradford, Stan Cribb and Stan Woodhouse all getting on the scoresheet. A third friendly followed a week later against Dorset League club Wimborne Town. Southampton picked up another convincing win when they beat the Magpies 6–2, Haines and Dick Rowley scoring two each, and Arnold and Bobby Weale scoring the other two.

As usual, the club ended the season with two matches against local rivals Portsmouth. The first, for the Rowland Hospital Cup, saw the Saints edge Pompey 2–1 at Fratton Park, with goals from Rowley and Bert Jepson enough to hold off the hosts despite a controversial headed goal from Jack Smith, which had reportedly failed to cross the line. Southampton also won the Hampshire Benevolent Cup two days later, beating Pompey at The Dell 3–2. Jimmy Easson opened the scoring for the visitors within five minutes, before an Arthur Bradford penalty made it 1–1 going into half-time. After the break, Rowley scored Southampton's second and set up the third for Herbert Coates, giving the hosts enough despite a second late goal from Easson (another controversial goal, as he was claimed to have been offside).

| 17 April 1929 Friendly | Guildford City | 1–3 | Southampton | Guildford |
| | | | Haines; Arnold | Stadium: Joseph's Road |

| 22 April 1929 Friendly | Warminster Town | 1–6 | Southampton | Warminster |
| | | | Haines; Bradford; Cribb; Woodhouse | Stadium: Weymouth Street |

| 29 April 1929 Friendly | Wimborne Town | 2–6 | Southampton | Wimborne Minster |
| | | | Haines; Rowley; Arnold; Weale | Stadium: The Cuthbury |

| 6 May 1929 Rowland Hospital Cup | Portsmouth | 1–2 | Southampton | Portsmouth |
| | J. Smith | | Rowley; Jepson | Stadium: Fratton Park; Referee: W. B. Stone |

| 8 May 1929 Hampshire BC | Southampton | 3–2 | Portsmouth | Southampton |
| | Bradford (pen.); Rowley; Coates | | Easson 5', 90' | Stadium: The Dell; Attendance: 2,154; Referee: W. B. Stone |

== Player details ==
Southampton used 25 different players during the 1928–29 season, 14 of whom scored during the campaign. The team played in a 2–3–5 formation throughout, using two full-backs, three half-backs, two outside forwards, two inside forwards and a centre-forward. Right-half Bert Shelley and goalkeeper Willie White made the most appearances for the club during the campaign, the former appearing in all but one league game and the end-of-season cups, and the latter playing in all but two league games and the FA Cup third round replay. Jerry Mackie and Stan Woodhouse both made 40 appearances in total during the season. Centre-forward Willie Haines finished as the season's top scorer with 16 goals, all in the Second Division. Outside-left Stan Cribb scored 13 league goals, followed by Dick Rowley who scored nine in the league and one each in the Rowland Hospital Cup and Hampshire Benevolent Cup. Arthur Bradford was the season's highest-scoring half-back, with three goals in all competitions.

=== Squad statistics ===
| Name | Pos. | Nat. | League | | FA Cup | | Other (Note: "Other" includes the Rowland Hospital Cup and Hampshire Benevolent Cup matches.) | | Total | |
| Name | Pos. | Nat. | Apps. | Gls. | Apps. | Gls. | Apps. | Gls. | Apps. | Gls. |
|---|---|---|---|---|---|---|---|---|---|---|
| Bill Adams | HB | (England) | 0 | 0 | 0 | 0 | 2 | 0 | 2 | 0 |
| Johnny Arnold | FW | (England) | 5 | 0 | 0 | 0 | 1 | 0 | 6 | 0 |
| Arthur Bradford | HB | (England) | 29 | 1 | 1 | 1 | 2 | 1 | 32 | 3 |
| Herbert Coates | FW | (England) | 14 | 7 | 0 | 0 | 2 | 1 | 16 | 8 |
| Stan Cribb | FW | (England) | 31 | 13 | 2 | 0 | 1 | 0 | 34 | 13 |
| Willie Haines | FW | (England) | 27 | 16 | 1 | 0 | 0 | 0 | 28 | 16 |
| George Harkus | HB | (England) | 25 | 0 | 1 | 0 | 2 | 0 | 28 | 0 |
| Ted Hough | FB | (England) | 33 | 0 | 2 | 0 | 2 | 0 | 37 | 0 |
| Bert Jepson | FW | (England) | 18 | 4 | 0 | 0 | 2 | 1 | 20 | 5 |
| Michael Keeping | FB | (England) | 37 | 1 | 2 | 0 | 0 | 0 | 39 | 1 |
| Bill Luckett | HB | (England) | 5 | 0 | 0 | 0 | 0 | 0 | 5 | 0 |
| Jerry Mackie | FW | (Scotland) | 40 | 10 | 2 | 0 | 0 | 0 | 42 | 10 |
| Billy Murphy | FW | (England) | 6 | 1 | 0 | 0 | 0 | 0 | 6 | 1 |
| Charlie Petrie | FW | (England) | 9 | 2 | 0 | 0 | 0 | 0 | 9 | 2 |
| Dick Rowley | FW | (Republic of Ireland) | 24 | 9 | 2 | 0 | 2 | 2 | 28 | 11 |
| Bert Shelley | HB | (England) | 41 | 1 | 2 | 0 | 0 | 0 | 43 | 1 |
| Bill Stoddart | HB | (England) | 4 | 0 | 0 | 0 | 2 | 0 | 6 | 0 |
| Tommy Taylor | FW | (England) | 4 | 2 | 0 | 0 | 0 | 0 | 4 | 2 |
| George Thompson | GK | (England) | 2 | 0 | 1 | 0 | 0 | 0 | 3 | 0 |
| Douglas Vernon | FW | (England) | 5 | 0 | 0 | 0 | 0 | 0 | 5 | 0 |
| Archie Waterston | FW | (Scotland) | 6 | 1 | 1 | 0 | 0 | 0 | 7 | 1 |
| Bobby Weale | FW | (Wales) | 18 | 6 | 2 | 0 | 0 | 0 | 20 | 6 |
| Willie White | GK | (Scotland) | 40 | 0 | 1 | 0 | 2 | 0 | 43 | 0 |
| Stan Woodhouse | HB | (England) | 38 | 0 | 2 | 0 | 2 | 0 | 42 | 0 |
Players with appearances who left before the end of the season
| Tom Sloan | FW | (England) | 1 | 0 | 0 | 0 | 0 | 0 | 1 | 0 |

=== Most appearances ===
| Rank | Name | Pos. | League | | FA Cup | | Other | | Total | |
| Rank | Name | Pos. | Apps. | % | Apps. | % | Apps. | % | Apps. | % |
|---|---|---|---|---|---|---|---|---|---|---|
| 1 | Bert Shelley | HB | 41 | 97.62 | 2 | 100.00 | 0 | 0.00 | 43 | 93.48 |
| 1 | Willie White | GK | 40 | 95.24 | 1 | 50.00 | 2 | 100.00 | 43 | 93.48 |
| 3 | Jerry Mackie | FW | 40 | 95.24 | 2 | 100.00 | 0 | 0.00 | 42 | 91.30 |
| 3 | Stan Woodhouse | HB | 38 | 90.48 | 2 | 100.00 | 2 | 100.00 | 42 | 91.30 |
| 5 | Michael Keeping | FB | 37 | 88.10 | 2 | 100.00 | 0 | 0.00 | 39 | 84.78 |
| 6 | Ted Hough | FB | 33 | 78.57 | 2 | 100.00 | 2 | 100.00 | 37 | 80.43 |
| 7 | Stan Cribb | FW | 31 | 73.81 | 2 | 100.00 | 1 | 50.00 | 34 | 73.91 |
| 8 | Arthur Bradford | HB | 29 | 69.05 | 1 | 50.00 | 2 | 100.00 | 32 | 69.57 |
| 9 | Willie Haines | FW | 27 | 64.29 | 1 | 50.00 | 0 | 0.00 | 28 | 60.87 |
| 9 | George Harkus | HB | 25 | 59.52 | 1 | 50.00 | 2 | 100.00 | 28 | 60.87 |
| 9 | Dick Rowley | FW | 24 | 57.14 | 2 | 100.00 | 2 | 100.00 | 28 | 60.87 |

=== Top goalscorers ===
| Rank | Name | Pos. | League | | FA Cup | | Other | | Total | |
| Rank | Name | Pos. | Gls. | GPG | Gls. | GPG | Gls. | GPG | Gls. | GPG |
|---|---|---|---|---|---|---|---|---|---|---|
| 1 | Willie Haines | FW | 16 | 0.59 | 0 | 0.00 | 0 | 0.00 | 16 | 0.57 |
| 2 | Stan Cribb | FW | 13 | 0.41 | 0 | 0.00 | 0 | 0.00 | 13 | 0.38 |
| 3 | Dick Rowley | FW | 9 | 0.37 | 0 | 0.00 | 2 | 1.00 | 11 | 0.39 |
| 4 | Jerry Mackie | FW | 10 | 0.25 | 0 | 0.00 | 0 | 0.00 | 10 | 0.23 |
| 5 | Herbert Coates | FW | 7 | 0.50 | 0 | 0.00 | 1 | 0.50 | 8 | 0.50 |
| 6 | Bobby Weale | FW | 6 | 0.33 | 0 | 0.00 | 0 | 0.00 | 6 | 0.30 |
| 7 | Bert Jepson | FW | 4 | 0.22 | 0 | 0.00 | 1 | 0.50 | 5 | 0.25 |
| 8 | Arthur Bradford | HB | 1 | 0.03 | 1 | 1.00 | 1 | 0.50 | 3 | 0.09 |
| 9 | Tommy Taylor | FW | 2 | 0.50 | 0 | 0.00 | 0 | 0.003 | 2 | 0.50 |
| 9 | Charlie Petrie | FW | 2 | 0.22 | 0 | 0.00 | 0 | 0.00 | 2 | 0.22 |

== Bibliography ==
- Chalk, Gary; Holley, Duncan (10 August 1987), A Complete Record of Southampton Football Club: 1885–1987, Derby, England: Breedon Books, ISBN 978-0907969228
- Chalk, Gary; Holley, Duncan; Bull, David (28 November 2013), All the Saints: A Complete Who's Who of Southampton FC, Bristol, England: Hagiology Publishing, ISBN 978-0992686406
- Juson, Dave; Aldworth, Clay; Bendel, Barry; Bull, David; Chalk, Gary (10 November 2004), Saints v Pompey: A History of Unrelenting Rivalry, Bristol, England: Hagiology Publishing, ISBN 978-0953447459
