= Bobby Weale =

Welsh footballer (1905–1952)

Personal information
- Full name: Robert Henry Weale
- Date of birth: 16 December 1905
- Place of birth: Troed-y-rhiw, Wales
- Date of death: 8 December 1952 (aged 46)
- Place of death: Merthyr Tydfil, Wales
- Height: 5 ft 7 in (1.70 m)
- Position: Outside right

Youth career
- Ebbw Vale
- Merthyr Tydfil

Senior career*
Years	Team	Apps	(Gls)
1925–1927	West Ham United	3	(0)
1927–1928	Swindon Town	20	(7)
1928–1930	Southampton	45	(10)
1930–1931	Cardiff City	5	(0)
1931	Boston Town		
1931–1932	Guildford City		
1932–1933	Newport County	26	(7)
1933–1935	Wrexham	23	(4)
1935–1936	Glentoran		
1936	Cheltenham Town		
1936	Bath City		
- * Club domestic league appearances and goals

Robert Henry Weale (16 December 1905 – 8 December 1952) was a Welsh footballer who played as an outside right for various clubs in England and Wales in the 1920s and 1930s.

== Football career ==
=== West Ham United ===
Weale was born in Troed-y-rhiw in Glamorgan and after playing youth football for Merthyr Tydfil he was signed by West Ham United in March 1925. He made his first team debut on 10 October 1925, replacing Tommy Yews in a 1–0 victory over Notts County. He only made three First Division appearances for the "Hammers" in his two years with the club, before being transferred to Swindon Town in June 1927.

=== Swindon Town ===
He made his Swindon Town debut on 17 September 1927 in a Third Division South match against Charlton Athletic (drawn 2–2). Weale was unable to displace the long serving Bertie Denyer on the right wing and it was only in April 1928 that he had a run in the first team when he played five matches, initially on the left (replacing Alec Thom) before switching to his favoured right wing. In the following season, he replaced Denyer for a run of thirteen matches from September, in which he scored seven goals (including twice against both Brighton & Hove Albion and Torquay United in consecutive matches). Once Denyer returned from injury in early December, Weale was transferred to Southampton.

=== Southampton ===
The "Saints" paid a then club record of £1000 to bring Weale to The Dell having been watching him for some time. He immediately replaced Bert Jepson in the No. 7 shirt and made his debut on 8 December 1928 in a 1–1 draw at Clapton Orient. A "fast, clever right winger", he made a promising start to his Southampton career, and scored a hat trick in a 4–0 victory over Notts County on Boxing Day, following this with goals in the next two matches. His crosses helped the centre-forwards, Willie Haines (in 1928–29) and Dick Rowley (in 1929–30) to score 16 and 25 goals respectively.

By the middle of the 1929–30 season, Weale's form had become erratic and he lost his place to Jepson. Despite this, the club offered him a new contract in the summer of 1930, with terms of £5 per week (both winter and summer) rising to £8 per week when in the first team. Weale declined the contract and decided to move back to Wales.

=== Later career ===
Weale spent the 1930–31 season with Cardiff City, for whom he made only five appearances before a spell in non-League football. He subsequently played for Newport County and Wrexham and then travelled to Belfast to join Glentoran, before finishing his career back in the lower leagues in England.

== Family ==
His younger brother, Tom, was also a professional footballer who had an unsuccessful trial with Southampton in 1929, before joining Swindon Town. He subsequently had long spells with Crewe Alexandra and Burnley.
