= Reg Watson (footballer) =

English footballer

Personal information
- Full name: Reginald Herbert Watson
- Date of birth: 26 August 1900
- Place of birth: Thelwall, England
- Date of death: January qtr. 1971 (aged 70)
- Place of death: Thelwall, England
- Height: 5 ft 9 in (1.75 m)
- Position: Outside forward

Youth career
- Thelwall
- Arpley Street
- Grappon Hall
- Fairfield United
- Monks Hall
- Witton Albion

Senior career*
| Years | Team | Apps | (Gls) |
| 1921–1929 | Oldham Athletic | 233 | (64) |
| 1929–1931 | Southampton | 19 | (5) |
| 1931–1932 | Rochdale | 17 | (8) |
| Total | | 269 | (77) |
- * Club domestic league appearances and goals

Reginald Herbert Watson (26 August 1900 – 1971) was an English professional footballer who played as an outside-forward in the 1920s and 1930s, spending most of his career with Oldham Athletic, before playing for Southampton and Rochdale.

== Football career ==
Watson was born in Thelwall, near Warrington and played for various clubs in Warrington before joining Witton Albion of the Cheshire County League. He had an unsuccessful trial with Manchester United before joining Oldham Athletic in December 1921.

Watson remained with the Boundary Park for nearly eight years, during which time he made 233 appearances in the Football League, scoring 64 goals. At the time he joined Oldham, they were a First Division club, but were relegated to the Second Division in 1923. In November 1925, he scored twice in an FA Cup first round match against Lytham; the final score was 10–1 to Oldham with the other goals coming from Horace Barnes (three), Arthur Ormston (two), Albert Pynegar (two) and Jimmy Naylor; this remains Oldham's largest victory in the FA Cup. Watson followed this up with four goals in the next round, in a 6–4 victory at Stockton.

In the summer of 1929, he was the "makeweight" in a deal with Southampton for the transfer of Billy Murphy. Watson struggled to acclimatise to life on the south coast, despite being noted as a "great trier". He made his debut for the Saints playing at outside-left in the opening match of the 1929–30 season, a 3–1 defeat at Barnsley. Watson retained his place for the next five matches, scoring three goals, including a brace against Blackpool before losing his place to Stan Cribb. Watson was only third choice on the left behind Cribb and Johnny Arnold and was in and out of the side for the remainder of the season, making a total of 14 appearances in the Second Division, scoring four goals.

In the following season, he was only able to play when Arnold was playing cricket for Hampshire, and managed only a further five appearances, with one goal. Watson was more successful in the reserves, for whom he scored 36 goals in 63 matches.

In the summer of 1931, he was transfer-listed for a fee of £200 but was eventually allowed to return to Lancashire on a free transfer when he joined Rochdale in September. He only played for Rochdale for a few months, before he retired in February 1932.
