= Des Thompson =

English footballer

Personal information
- Full name: Desmond Thompson
- Date of birth: 4 December 1928
- Place of birth: Southampton, England
- Date of death: July 2010 (age 81)
- Place of death: Rotherham, England
- Position: Goalkeeper

Senior career*
Years	Team	Apps	(Gls)
1950–1952	York City	80	(0)
1952–1955	Burnley	62	(0)
1955–1964	Sheffield United	25	(0)
Total		167	(0)
- * Club domestic league appearances and goals

Desmond Thompson (4 December 1928 – July 2010) was an English professional footballer who played as a goalkeeper for York City, Burnley and Sheffield United. He was born in Southampton, the son of George Thompson, the Southampton goalkeeper.

His brother, George was also a professional goalkeeper, who played for Scunthorpe United, Preston North End, Manchester City and Carlisle United including playing for Preston on the losing side in the 1954 FA Cup Final.
