= Bill Luckett =

English footballer

Personal information
- Full name: William Luckett
- Date of birth: 6 September 1903
- Place of birth: St Helens, Lancashire, England
- Date of death: 5 July 1985 (aged 81)
- Place of death: Shirley, Southampton, England
- Height: 5 ft 9 in (1.75 m)
- Position: Half back

Youth career
- Skelmersdale United

Senior career*
| Years | Team | Apps | (Gls) |
| 1927–1937 | Southampton | 219 | (10) |
| 1937–1939 | Cowes Sports | | |

Managerial career
- 1954–1955: Andover
- * Club domestic league appearances and goals

William Luckett (6 September 1903 – 5 July 1985) was an English professional footballer who played for Southampton as a left-half in the 1920s and 1930s, making over 200 appearances.

== Playing career ==
=== Early days ===
Luckett was born in St Helens, Lancashire and played his early football with Skelmersdale United, from where he had an unsuccessful trial with Liverpool.

=== Southampton ===
In August 1927, shortly before his 24th birthday, he joined Southampton, then in the Second Division. He made a "spectacular" first-team debut came on 21 January 1928, when he scored twice from the right-wing in a 5–1 home victory over Notts County. He retained his place for the next two matches, before Bill Henderson returned from injury. Later in the season, Luckett made three appearances at outside-left, replacing the injured Stan Cribb.

In the next season, Luckett's first-team chances were restricted by the form of Stan Woodhouse at left-half, and his five appearances came in four different positions as the "Saints" had their best season since joining the Second Division in 1922, finishing fourth in the table. In 1929–30, Luckett made 12 appearances, generally standing in for Woodhouse, who was beginning to suffer from injury at frequent intervals.

For the early part of the 1930–31 season, Luckett made only a handful of appearances, before injury to Woodhouse again earned Luckett a recall at left-half. Described as "not a particularly skilful player (who) had a voracious appetite for work", Luckett "would chase around the pitch like a terrier". He now began to make the left-half position his own, eventually forcing manager George Kay to switch Woodhouse to the right.

Luckett was "ever-present" in 1932–33, playing at left-half until mid-February, before being pushed forward to outside-left to replace Johnny Arnold who had been transferred to Fulham along with Michael Keeping. Luckett scored five goals from the left-wing, including two in a 3–1 victory over Burnley on 15 April.

Luckett missed the start of the 1933–34 season and with Woodhouse back at left-half, he replaced Fred Tully (who had been signed to replace John Arnold) at outside-left, before Tully returned in December. Luckett eventually regained his place at left-half in early March. With age now catching up on Woodhouse, Luckett retained the No. 6 shirt for 1934–35 only missing four matches as the Saints struggled both on and off the pitch, finishing only two places above the relegation zone and needing two borrow £200 from the Supporters Club to help finance the summer wage bill.

Luckett made 18 appearances at the start of the 1935–36 season, before an ankle injury put him out for several months, with Woodhouse once again replacing him. After two attempts at a return to first-team action, Luckett retired in the summer of 1937, having made 219 appearances over ten years, scoring 10 goals.

== Coaching career ==
After retiring from playing at the age of 34, Luckett joined Cowes Sports as a player-coach, remaining with the Isle of Wight club up to the start of World War II. During the war, he joined the Royal Air Force where he became a Physical Training instructor at RAF Ford. Whilst at Ford, he spotted the potential of Eric Day and recommended him to the Saints.

After the war, Luckett returned to The Dell, spending seven years as the trainer for the reserve and "A" teams. He then had a brief spell, from September 1954 to January 1955 as manager at Andover.

He was the landlord of the Salisbury Arms at Christchurch before the war, and after the war was the landlord of the Juniper Berry in Southampton. He continued to play Sunday football into his 60s, turning out for the Ordnance Survey in 1964.

In his retirement, Luckett lived in Shirley, Southampton where he died in July 1985.
