= George Thompson (footballer, born 1926) =

English footballer

Personal information
- Full name: George Herbert Thompson
- Date of birth: 15 September 1926
- Place of birth: Maltby, England
- Date of death: 7 March 2004 (aged 77)
- Position: Goalkeeper

Senior career*
Years	Team	Apps	(Gls)
1947–1950	Chesterfield	0	(0)
1950–1952	Scunthorpe & Lindsey United	92	(0)
1952–1956	Preston North End	140	(0)
1956–1957	Manchester City	2	(0)
1957–1962	Carlisle United	203	(0)
1962–19??	Morecambe		
Total		437	(0)

International career
1954	England B	1	(0)
- * Club domestic league appearances and goals

George Herbert Thompson (15 September 1926 – 7 March 2004) was an English footballer who played as a goalkeeper in the 1950s and 1960s for Scunthorpe United, Preston North End, Manchester City and Carlisle United including playing on the losing side in the 1954 FA Cup final.

== Football career ==
Thompson was born in Maltby, West Riding of Yorkshire, the son of George Thompson, the York City (and later Southampton) goalkeeper. His brother, Des, also played as a goalkeeper, for York City, Burnley and Sheffield United.

Thompson's professional career started when he signed for Chesterfield in June 1947. He spent three years at Saltergate without making a first-team appearance. In June 1950, he joined Scunthorpe & Lindsey United for their first season in the Third Division North of the Football League, making his debut on the opening day of the season on 11 August 1950 against Shrewsbury Town, also newly elected to the Football league. Thompson kept a clean sheet as the match finished 0–0. Over the next two seasons, he became a first team fixture, making 92 league appearances for Scunthorpe.

In October 1952, Thompson joined Preston North End, replacing Malcolm Newlands, and made his debut in a 5–2 victory at Portsmouth on 25 October. He made 30 appearances during the 1952–53 season, keeping ten clean sheets, as Preston finished runners-up to Arsenal for the First Division title. On 14 February 1953, Preston North End were playing Sheffield Wednesday at Deepdale; Derek Dooley was chasing a long pass from Albert Quixall when he collided with Thompson just as he made contact with the ball, breaking the centre-forward's leg in two places. Dooley never recovered from his injuries with gangrene setting into his leg, and as a result had to have his right leg amputated just above the knee, thus ending his playing career.

In the 1953–54 season, Thompson made 39 league appearances and was part of the Preston team which reached the final of the FA Cup. In the match against West Bromwich Albion, on 1 May 1954, led 2–1 thanks to goals from Angus Morrison and Charlie Wayman. A penalty conceded by Tommy Docherty and a late goal from Frank Griffin who slipped the ball under Thompson turned the game which ended 3–2.

Thompson played regularly over the next two seasons before losing his place to the younger Fred Else. Thompson's last Preston match came on 24 March 1956 in a 2–1 win at home to Portsmouth. In all he made 155 appearances for Preston in four years. During his time at the Deepdale club, Thompson also won England 'B' honours; his international appearance came on 22 May 1954 when he was a half-time substitute for Ray King in a 2–0 defeat by their Swiss equivalents.

Thompson joined Manchester City in June 1956 as understudy to Bert Trautmann, making only two first-team appearances in his year at Maine Road.

In the summer of 1957, Thompson joined Carlisle United where he stayed for five seasons making 206 appearances before retiring in 1962, dropping down to non-League football with Morecambe.

== Private life ==
Thompson was a "brilliant artist," well known for his caricatures of League footballers.

== Honours ==
Preston North End

- FA Cup runner-up: 1953–54
