= Oswald Littler =

English footballer

Personal information
- Full name: Oswald Littler
- Date of birth: 15 February 1907
- Place of birth: Billinge, England
- Date of death: 21 January 1970 (aged 62)
- Place of death: Billinge, Merseyside, England
- Height: 5 ft 9 in (1.75 m)
- Position: Inside forward

Youth career
- Billinge
- Skelmersdale United
- Northwich Victoria

Senior career*
| Years | Team | Apps | (Gls) |
| 1928–1929 | Rochdale | 4 | (1) |
| 1929–1930 | Southampton | 12 | (3) |
| 1930–1931 | Southport | 15 | (3) |
| 1931–1933 | Barrow | 15 | (3) |
| 1933–19?? | Winsford United | | |
- * Club domestic league appearances and goals

Oswald Littler (15 February 1907 – 21 January 1970) was an English professional footballer who played as an inside-forward for various clubs in the 1920s and 1930s.

== Football career ==
Littler was born in Billinge, near St Helens and played football as an amateur with various clubs including Skelmersdale United of the Liverpool County Football Combination and Northwich Victoria in the Cheshire County League while working as a payroll clerk in a Lancashire colliery.

His first professional contract came when he joined Rochdale of the Football League Third Division North in July 1928. A year later, he moved to the south coast to join Southampton of the Second Division on trial, before being signed in August 1929.

He made his debut for the Saints when he took the place of the injured Jerry Mackie at inside-right for the home match against Chelsea on 21 September 1929. The match was won 4–2, with a hat-trick from Dick Rowley; this was followed by a 5–0 victory at Nottingham Forest where he scored twice, with Rowley claiming a second consecutive hat-trick. Littler retained his place for a further ten matches, scoring once more, until December 1929, when, after a run of four matches without a win, manager Arthur Chadwick made seven changes for the match at Reading, replacing Littler with Bill Fraser.

In the summer of 1930, Littler was given a free transfer and returned to Lancashire to join Southport. A year later, he moved on to Barrow before winding up his career back in the Cheshire County League with Winsford United.
