= Douglas Vernon =

English footballer

Personal information
- Full name: Douglas Sydney Vernon
- Date of birth: 19 May 1905
- Place of birth: Devonport, England
- Date of death: 26 March 1979 (aged 73)
- Place of death: Morden, England
- Height: 5 ft 10 in (1.78 m)
- Position: Centre-forward

Youth career
- Royal Air Force

Senior career*
| Years | Team | Apps | (Gls) |
| 1929 | Southampton | 5 | (0) |
| 1930–1931 | Wycombe Wanderers | | |
| 1931–19?? | Leyton | | |
- * Club domestic league appearances and goals

Douglas Sydney Vernon (19 May 1905 – 26 March 1979) was an English amateur footballer who made five appearances for Southampton in the Football League in 1929. He also played for Wycombe Wanderers, with whom he won an FA Amateur Cup winner's medal in 1931.

== Football career ==
Born in Devonport, Devon, Vernon was a leading aircraftsman with the Royal Air Force and represented them at football. In February 1929, he joined Southampton of the Football League Second Division.

Within days of being signed, he made his first-team debut when he took the place of the injured Willie Haines for the match at Oldham Athletic on 9 February 1929, which ended as a 3–1 defeat. Vernon retained his place for the next four matches without scoring before being replaced by Archie Waterston.

His Southampton career ended shortly afterwards when he was posted by the R.A.F. to the Far East. On his return from active service, he joined Wycombe Wanderers of the Isthmian League, although Southampton retained his Football League registration. During his one season at Wycombe, they finished third in the league but won the FA Amateur Cup, defeating Hayes 1–0 in the final, played at the Arsenal Stadium.

Vernon's club career ended at Leyton in the Athenian League.

== Later career ==
After leaving the R.A.F., Vernon joined the Metropolitan Police, for whom he played football until the start of the Second World War.

== Honours ==
Wycombe Wanderers

- FA Amateur Cup winners: 1931
