= George Ashmore =

English footballer

Personal information
- Full name: George Samuel Austin Ashmore
- Date of birth: 5 May 1898
- Place of birth: Plymouth, England
- Date of death: 12 May 1973 (aged 75)
- Place of death: Handsworth, Birmingham, England
- Height: 5 ft 10 in (1.78 m)
- Position: Goalkeeper

Youth career
- Nineveh Wesley

Senior career*
| Years | Team | Apps | (Gls) |
| 1919–1931 | West Bromwich Albion | 245 | (0) |
| 1931–1933 | Chesterfield | 71 | (0) |

International career
| 1926 | England | 1 | (0) |
- * Club domestic league appearances and goals

George Samuel Austin Ashmore (5 May 1898 – 12 May 1973) was an English footballer who played for West Bromwich Albion and Chesterfield, as well as the England national team.

== Career ==
Ashmore was born in Plymouth and represented South Devon & District Schools. After playing for Nineveh Wesley in Handsworth, he joined West Bromwich Albion in November 1919, and soon replaced Hubert Pearson as the first choice goalkeeper. He made his league debut in October 1920 against Blackburn Rovers at Ewood Park, a match that Albion lost 5–1.

On 24 March 1928 (Easter Monday), Albion played Southampton at The Dell. Ashmore was injured and was replaced in goal by a defender and was switched to the wing. In the second half, with the scores level at 2–2, Ashmore was back helping out in defence. Forgetting that he was now an outfield player, Ashmore caught the ball in the penalty area; Stan Cribb duly scored from the penalty spot to give the "Saints" the victory.

His solitary appearance for England came on 24 May 1926 in a friendly against Belgium. The match finished 5–3 to England with Frank Osborne scoring a hat-trick as England came from 3–2 down to take the match.

After 268 appearances for West Bromwich Albion, he lost his place to Harry Pearson, Hubert's son, and in October 1931, Ashmore joined Chesterfield. At Chesterfield, he was a regular for two seasons and played in 71 league games before announcing his retirement in 1933.

After he retired from football he worked for the MEB. He died on 12 May 1973 at the age of 75.
