= Fred Else =

English footballer and manager (1933–2015)

Personal information
- Full name: Fredrick Else
- Date of birth: 31 March 1933
- Place of birth: Golborne, England
- Date of death: 20 July 2015 (aged 82)
- Place of death: Barrow-in-Furness, England
- Height: 1.78 m (5 ft 10 in)
- Position: Goalkeeper

Youth career
- 1951: Axwell Park Colliery Welfare
- 1951–1953: Preston North End

Senior career*
Years	Team	Apps	(Gls)
1953–1961	Preston North End	215	(0)
1961–1966	Blackburn Rovers	187	(0)
1966–1970	Barrow	148	(0)
Total		550	(0)

International career
1957	England B	1	(0)

Managerial career
- 1970: Barrow
- * Club domestic league appearances and goals

Fredrick Else (31 March 1933 – 20 July 2015) was an English footballer, who played as a goalkeeper. Else gained over 600 professional appearances in his career playing for three clubs, Preston North End, Blackburn Rovers and Barrow.

== Club career ==
Else was born in Golborne near Wigan on 31 March 1933. Whilst on national service in the north-east he played for amateur club Axwell Park Colliery Welfare in the Derwent Valley League. He attracted the attention of Football League teams and signed as a junior for Preston North End in 1951, and as a professional in 1953. He made his debut for Preston against Manchester City in 1954, but was restricted to 14 appearances over his first three seasons. He eventually became first choice, displacing George Thompson, and played 238 times for North End. During this time Preston's most successful season came in 1957–58, when the club finished as runners up in Division One.

The 1960–61 season ended in relegation for Preston and Else was sold to neighbours Blackburn Rovers for £20,000. Else became a first choice for Blackburn straight away and played 221 times for the club. A collarbone injury in 1964–65 resulted in a period out of the game, though Else returned to regain the goalkeeper's jersey at Blackburn. Nonetheless, the team were relegated the following season and Else was released. During the summer of 1966 Else signed with Barrow of the Fourth Division. Else became part of Barrow's most successful team, with the side winning promotion to the Third Division in his first season there. Else was Barrow's first choice keeper for the entire period that they were in the third division, and played 148 league matches for the club. He retired from football after Barrow's relegation in 1970 following a leg infection. His final season included a brief stint as caretaker manager at Barrow.

=== Honours ===
- Football League Division One Runner-up 1957–1958
- Football League Division Four Promotion 1966–1967

== International career ==
Else has been described by fans of the clubs that he played for as one of the best English goalkeepers never to win a full international cap. He did, however, make one appearance for the England B team in 1957 against Scotland B, as well as participating in a Football Association touring side of 1961.

== Personal life and death ==
Else met his wife Marjorie in 1949 in Douglas on the Isle of Man. They married when Else was 22 and Marjorie 20, on 29 October 1955, a Saturday morning. The wedding was held in Marjorie's home town of Blackpool and the date was chosen so that the couple could marry in the morning and Else could then travel either to Deepdale, to play for Preston North End's reserve team, or to Bloomfield Road where Preston's first team was due to be playing Blackpool F.C. In the event Else was selected for the reserves and the couple had to travel by bus to Preston.

After retiring from football, Else remained in Barrow-in-Furness, becoming a geography and maths teacher at a local secondary school. He retired from teaching in 1999 and moved to Cyprus, though still attended some Barrow matches. Else died in Barrow-in-Furness on 20 July 2015, aged 82.
