= Ernie Warren =

English footballer

Personal information
- Full name: Ernest Thorne Warren
- Date of birth: 14 September 1910
- Place of birth: Sunderland, Tyne and Wear, England
- Height: 5 ft 10 in (1.78 m)
- Position: Inside left

Youth career
- Usworth Colliery

Senior career*
Years	Team	Apps	(Gls)
1929–1931	Southampton	1	(0)
1931–1933	Burton Town		
1933–1934	Northampton Town	2	(1)
1934–1935	Hartlepools United	15	(0)
- South Shields
- * Club domestic league appearances and goals

Ernest Thorne Warren (born 14 September 1910) was an English professional footballer who played as an inside-forward for various clubs in the 1930s, including Southampton, Northampton Town and Hartlepools United in the Football League.

== Football career ==
Thorne was born in Sunderland and played football for his colliery side at Usworth when he was spotted by scouts from Southampton and invited to the south coast to join the Second Division side.

He started his career at The Dell in the reserves for whom he scored eight goals in 12 games leading to a place in the first team when he was selected to play at inside-left at West Bromwich Albion in the final game of the 1929–30 season. The game ended in a 5–1 defeat as the Saints finished seventh in the table.

Although Vernon remained with Southampton for another year, he was not selected again for the first team and left the club in the summer of 1931, dropping down to the Birmingham & District League with Burton Town.

In 1933, he returned to the Football League, spending a season each at Northampton Town and Hartlepools United before winding up his career at South Shields in the North Eastern League.
