= Herbert Coates =

English footballer

Personal information
- Full name: Herbert James Leopold Coates
- Date of birth: 29 September 1901
- Place of birth: West Ham, England
- Date of death: 25 October 1965 (aged 64)
- Place of death: Southsea, England
- Height: 5 ft 8 in (1.73 m)
- Position: Inside left

Youth career
- Royal Navy

Senior career*
Years	Team	Apps	(Gls)
1928–1934	Southampton	99	(26)
1934–19??	Leyton		

International career
1928–1931	England amateur	8	
- * Club domestic league appearances and goals

Herbert James Leopold "Rigger" Coates (29 September 1901 – 25 October 1965) was an English amateur footballer who played as an inside forward for Southampton in the 1920s and 1930s.

== Royal Navy ==
Coates was born in West Ham, Essex and joined the Royal Navy, where he served on the Royal Yacht "Victoria and Albert". He represented the Royal Navy at football at an amateur level, but in October 1927 he joined Southampton of the Football League Second Division.

== Southampton ==
He made his Southampton debut away to Chelsea on 27 October 1928, replacing the ageing Charlie Petrie at inside-left. After six matches, in which he failed to score, he was replaced by Dick Rowley. His duties on the Royal Yacht tended to restrict his appearances, but by the end of the season he had made 14 appearances, scoring seven goals (including one in each of his last five appearances), as the Saints finished fourth in the table, their highest League finish to date.

In the following season, he was a regular starter until early March, with Peter Dougall generally filling in when Coates was not available; Coates made a total of 25 appearances during the season, with four goals. He played for the "Amateurs" in the 1929 FA Charity Shield. For the 1930–31 season, he was restricted to sixteen appearances, most of which came in a spell between late September and December in which he scored seven goals, including two in a 5–0 victory over Bury on 13 December.

Coates made a total of eight appearances for the England amateur international side, the last of which came against Scotland in 1931. He was described by one of his teammates as:

"One of the finest inside lefts that ever wore an England Amateur jersey, and his clever dribbling, his brilliant anticipation and his terrific shots more than compensated for the fact that his play may have been a bit on the showy side."

For the 1931–32 season, Arthur Wilson had taken over from Dougall as the regular inside-left, but Coates did manage a run of seven games between September and November, plus three later appearances across the forward line. At the end of the season, both Dougall and Wilson had left the club and Coates hardly missed a match in 1932–33 (making 30 appearances) until April, when Tom Ruddy replaced him. In a league match at Bradford City on 15 October 1932, Coates had to deputise in goal for Bert Scriven when he was injured. The "Football Echo" reported that "Coates was tucking his jersey into his shorts when Bradford scored immediately following the restart and before the amateur was ready" – this was the only goal of the game.

After a further four appearances early in the 1933–34 season, Coates moved to Leyton and was an FA Amateur Cup finalist with them that season. Leyton were then a top amateur side, playing in the Athenian League.

== Later career ==
Coates continued to play for the Royal Navy until 1937. After the Second World War, he settled in the Portsmouth area where he became the manager of a public house in 1945. He later worked for the Southern Electricity Board.
