= George Thompson (footballer, born 1900) =

English footballer

Personal information
- Full name: George Herbert Thompson
- Date of birth: October qtr. 1900
- Place of birth: Treeton, England
- Date of death: 6 June 1968 (aged 67)
- Place of death: Preston, England
- Height: 6 ft 0 in (1.83 m)
- Position: Goalkeeper

Senior career*
Years	Team	Apps	(Gls)
19??–1927	York City		
1927–1930	Southampton	14	(0)
1930–19??	Dinnington Miners' Welfare		
- * Club domestic league appearances and goals

George Herbert Thompson (1900 – 6 June 1968) was an English footballer who played for York City and Southampton as a goalkeeper during the 1920s.

== Career ==
Thompson was born in Treeton, near Rotherham, Yorkshire and trained as a joiner. After playing for his local village team, he started his professional career with York City, then playing in the Midland League.

In August 1927, he moved to the south coast to join Southampton of the Football League Second Division. He made his debut on 10 September, when he replaced the injured Tommy Allen away to Notts County. He kept a clean sheet on his debut (0–0) and retained his place in goal for a further seven matches before Allen's return to fitness in November. After that his appearances were only sporadic, providing cover for Allen or his replacement, Willie White.

In his three years at The Dell, Thompson made only sixteen first-team appearances, including two defeats in the FA Cup. In the 1929–30 Round 3 match at Bradford City, Thompson allowed a shot to crawl under his body after an awful defensive mix-up for Bradford's first goal, with Saints going on to lose the match 4–1. Thompson spent most of his "Saints" career in the reserves, where he made 159 appearances.

In the summer of 1930, with Bert Scriven now promoted to second-choice 'keeper behind White, Thompson was placed on the transfer list for a fee of £250. With no offers being received, Thompson was eventually released, and returned to his native Yorkshire to resume his career as a joiner, in the Dinnington coalmines.

== Family ==
Thompson had two sons, both of whom became professional goalkeepers – George Jnr. who played for Scunthorpe United, Preston North End, Manchester City and Carlisle United including playing on the losing side in the 1954 FA Cup Final, and Des, who played for York City, Burnley and Sheffield United.
