= Billy Murphy (footballer) =

English footballer (1894-1975)

Personal information
- Full name: William Murphy
- Date of birth: 23 May 1894
- Place of birth: St Helens, England
- Date of death: 11 June 1975 (aged 81)
- Place of death: St Helens, England
- Height: 5 ft 6 in (1.68 m)
- Position: Winger

Youth career
- Liverpool
- Alexandra Victoria

Senior career*
Years	Team	Apps	(Gls)
1918–1926	Manchester City	209	(30)
1926–1929	Southampton	74	(9)
1929–1930	Oldham Athletic	2	(1)
1930–1932	Tranmere Rovers	3	(0)
1932–19??	Ellesmere Port Town		
- * Club domestic league appearances and goals

William Murphy (23 May 1894 – 11 June 1975), often known as Spud Murphy, was an English footballer who played as a winger for Manchester City, Southampton, Oldham Athletic and Tranmere Rovers.

A runner in his youth, Murphy became an amateur footballer when the outbreak of the First World War caused his running club to disband. In 1918 he signed amateur terms with First Division Manchester City, turning professional when competitive football resumed after the war. He made 220 appearances for the club, before joining Southampton in 1926. He stayed on the south coast for three seasons, before returning to the north-west where he had spells with Oldham Athletic and Tranmere Rovers.

== Early career ==
Born in St Helens, Lancashire, Murphy's speed gave him local renown in his youth, when he became known among pigeon keepers for the haste with which he reported the arrivals of birds. He was also a talented cross country runner, running for the Peasley Cross Harriers club. The club was disbanded at the start of the First World War, and Murphy turned his attention to football.

== Football career ==
=== Manchester City ===
He signed for Manchester City from Alexandra Victoria on 2 February 1918, as an amateur. He made several appearances for the club in the wartime Lancashire League, including an appearance against Everton in which he scored in the first minutes to consign the Toffeemen to their first defeat of the season. When competitive football returned after the end of the war, Murphy turned professional, making his league debut against Bolton Wanderers on 13 September 1919, and a further 37 appearances that season. In the 1919–20 season, Murphy scored nine goals in 41 appearances as Manchester City finished as runner-up in the league. his performances resulted in interest from the Irish Football Association, who prompted by Murphy's Irish-sounding surname wrote to enquire about his birthplace. In his reply, Manchester City manager Ernest Mangnall wrote "He comes from St Helens, where the pills come from".

Murphy was a regular on the Manchester City left wing for six seasons, but by 1925–26 he was no longer first choice, making only nine appearances, and on 18 August 1926, having scored 31 goals in 220 appearances for Manchester City, he joined Southampton for £350.

=== Southampton ===
Murphy was brought to the south coast by new manager Arthur Chadwick and, by Christmas 1926, prospects looked good as the Saints were only two points behind the Division Two leaders, with Murphy linking up well with centre forward Bill Rawlings. A reporter for the local newspaper described Murphy as "cute, quick and clever". The New Year saw a slump in the team's performances and by the end of the season they had fallen back to 13th place in the table. They did, however, have a good run in the FA Cup, reaching the semi-finals where they went out to Arsenal, with Murphy appearing in all the cup matches. In the 1926–27 season, in which he linked up well with Sam Taylor and Stan Woodhouse on the left, Murphy only missed one league match, scoring four goals.

The following season saw Murphy continuing on the left-wing until early March when he lost his place to Stan Cribb. Although he regained his place for the start of the 1928–29 season, Cribb once again replaced him and Murphy only made the occasional appearance before being released at the end of the season, with Saints having recruited Johnny Arnold to fill the left wing position.

In his time with the Saints, Murphy made a total of 81 appearances, scoring nine goals.

=== Later career ===
After leaving the Dell he joined Oldham Athletic for £100, with Reg Watson going in the opposite direction. He spent one season at Oldham, before joining his final league club Tranmere Rovers, after which he joined non-league Ellesmere Port Town.

He died at St. Helens in June 1975, aged 81.
