= Stan Cribb =

English footballer (1905–1989)

Personal information
- Full name: Stanley Roy Cribb
- Date of birth: 11 May 1905
- Place of birth: Gosport, England
- Date of death: 13 January 1989 (aged 83)
- Place of death: Gosport, England
- Height: 5 ft 8 in (1.73 m)
- Position: Outside left

Youth career
- 1923–1924: Gosport Athletic

Senior career*
Years	Team	Apps	(Gls)
1924–1930	Southampton	70	(22)
1930–1931	West Ham United	0	(0)
1931–1932	Queens Park Rangers	28	(12)
1932–1933	Cardiff City	27	(11)
Total		125	(45)

Managerial career
- 1944–1967: Gosport Borough
- * Club domestic league appearances and goals

Stanley Roy Cribb (11 May 1905 – 13 January 1989) was an English professional footballer who played for Southampton, Queens Park Rangers and Cardiff City as an outside left in the 1920s and 1930s. He later went on to help found and to manage Gosport Borough.

== Playing career ==
=== Early days ===
Cribb was born in Gosport, Hampshire and attended Grove Road School. He won County representative honours at sixteen before joining Gosport Athletic, helping them to win the Hampshire League in 1924. This brought Cribb to the notice of Southampton, who he joined in September 1924.

=== Southampton ===
Cribb made his debut for Southampton on 24 January 1925, in a Second Division match against Crystal Palace, replacing Jimmy Carr on the left-wing. Carr returned after four matches, although Cribb made a further two appearances in April. Although he established a reputation as a quick outside-left, his first-team appearances were rather occasional, making only 28 appearances in his first four seasons at The Dell with firstly Jimmy Carr and then Billy Murphy being preferred on the left. In early March 1928, Cribb finally took over the No. 11 shirt from Murphy, retaining his place for the remainder of the season.

On 24 March 1928 (Easter Monday), the "Saints" played West Bromwich Albion at The Dell. Albion's goalkeeper, George Ashmore was injured and was replaced in goal by a defender and was switched to the wing. In the second half, with the scores level at 2–2, Ashmore was back helping out in defence. Forgetting that he was now an outfield player, Ashmore caught the ball in the penalty area – Cribb duly scored from the penalty spot to give Saints the victory.

Although Cribb missed the opening match of the 1928–29 season, he returned in the second match and retained his place for the rest of the season, making 33 appearances, scoring 13 goals, including two in an 8–2 victory over Blackpool (with Willie Haines scoring four). By the end of the season, however, Cribb had lost his place to new signing Johnny Arnold who retained it for the following season, during which Cribb only made eleven appearances.

=== Later career ===
In the summer of 1930, First Division club West Ham United paid £500 for Cribb's services as cover for Jimmy Ruffell, but he never made the first-team before moving across London to join Queens Park Rangers the following summer. He scored 13 goals in 28 appearances for Rangers, before a further move to Cardiff City in July 1932. After 11 goals from 29 appearances for the Ninian Park club, he retired in the summer of 1933.

== Coaching career ==
Following his retirement from playing, he returned to Gosport and coached with Haslar Sports F.C. before helping to found Gosport Borough. In their first season (1944–45), the football section of the Club won the Portsmouth and District League Division One; the line-up at that time included Jimmy Scoular and Peter Harris who both went on to become full internationals.

Cribb continued to manage the club until 1967. Following his retirement, he retained his connections with football, scouting for Southampton and rarely missing a match at Privett Park.
