= Willie White (footballer, born 1895) =

Scottish footballer

Personal information
- Full name: William Collins White
- Date of birth: 5 March 1895
- Place of birth: Airdrie, Scotland
- Date of death: 28 November 1974 (aged 79)
- Place of death: Glasgow, Scotland
- Height: 5 ft 10 in (1.78 m)
- Position: Goalkeeper

Senior career*
Years	Team	Apps	(Gls)
1919–1923	Hamilton Academical	111	(0)
1923–1928	Heart of Midlothian	160	(0)
1928–1932	Southampton	101	(0)
1932–1933	Aldershot	0	(0)

International career
1923–1926	Scottish Football League XI	4	(0)
- * Club domestic league appearances and goals

William Collins White (5 March 1895 – 28 November 1974) was a Scottish football goalkeeper who played for Heart of Midlothian and Southampton during the 1920s and 1930s.

== Football career ==
=== Scotland ===
White started his football career at Hamilton Academical. In 1923 he joined Heart of Midlothian where his younger brother John was already playing. During his time with "Hearts" he made four appearances for the Scottish League. He became "idolised" at Tynecastle and his departure in July 1928 "infuriated" the Hearts' fans.

=== Southampton ===
White joined Southampton for a transfer fee of £800, of which £375 was contributed by the Southampton Supporters Club, replacing Tommy Allen who had moved on in the summer. White was described as "very much a student of the game", who concentrated for the full 90 minutes of every game. He made his debut away to Hull City on 25 August 1928 and his arrival helped restore confidence in a defence that had leaked 77 goals in the previous season. He only missed two matches in the 1928–29 season at the end of which the "Saints" achieved their highest league finish to date, fourth in the Second Division, with 60 goals conceded.

In the following season, White retained his place but the defence again conceded goals regularly, including four or more in six matches, ending the season with a "goals against" total of 76, and a seventh-place finish. In September 1930, he lost his place to Bert Scriven and although White regained his place in goal for the last eight matches of the season, Scriven claimed the No. 1 shirt on a permanent basis in September 1931.

At the end of the 1931–32, White left Southampton for a brief (non-playing) spell with Aldershot, who had recently been elected to the Third Division South. In his four years at The Dell, White made a total of 103 appearances.

== Career after football ==
On his retirement from football, White returned to Southampton to take over the Greyhound Inn in Cossack Street, before returning to Scotland, where he later worked as a foreman in a tube-steel works in Glasgow. He died in Glasgow on 28 November 1974.

== Family ==
Willie was one of four brothers who played top-class football – John was an inside-forward with Albion Rovers, Heart of Midlothian and Leeds United, Thomas was also with Hearts and Alloa Athletic, and James with Albion Rovers, Motherwell and in the United States. All four brothers played together for Hearts in the Lord Provost's Rent Relief Cup final of 1923 which their side won through two goals from Jock.

== See also ==
- List of Scottish football families
