= Willie Haines =

English footballer (1900–1974)

Personal information
- Full name: Wyndham William Pretoria Haines
- Date of birth: 14 July 1900
- Place of birth: Warminster, England
- Date of death: 5 November 1974 (aged 74)
- Place of death: Frome, Somerset, England
- Height: 5 ft 7 in (1.70 m)
- Position: Centre-forward

Youth career
- Warminster Town

Senior career*
Years	Team	Apps	(Gls)
1920–1922	Frome Town	62	(76)
1922–1928	Portsmouth	164	(119)
1928–1932	Southampton	70	(47)
1932–1937	Weymouth	166	(225)
1937	Frome Town	4	(3)
Total		466	(470)
- * Club domestic league appearances and goals

Wyndham William Pretoria Haines (14 July 1900 – 5 November 1974) was an English footballer who played at centre-forward for south coast rivals, Portsmouth and then Southampton in the 1920s and 1930s.

== Club career ==
Haines was born at Warminster Common in Wiltshire and went to the local school at Sambourne where he was a member of the school football team. As a youth he played for Warminster Town before joining Frome Town in the Western League, from where he joined Portsmouth (then playing in the Football League Third Division South) in December 1922.

=== Portsmouth ===
In his first season at Fratton Park, Haines made only six appearances, scoring three goals. In the following season, however, he displaced Alf Strange and became the first-choice centre-forward, scoring 28 goals from 30 league appearances, making him the division's top scorer as they won the Football League Third Division South championship.

Haines was nicknamed "Farmers Boy" and became something of a legend at Fratton Park, where the Pompey fans would often voice their approval of his forward play with a rendition of the popular refrain "To be a farmer's boy". As a centre-forward he had a style of his own and, rather than dashing around the field, he preferred to play at a more leisurely pace. He seldom tried to strike the ball hard, but preferred to place it with "tantalising precision".

In Portsmouth's first season in the Second Division, Haines shared the goal-scoring with Jerry Mackie with both players scoring 17 goals as Pompey finished in a creditable fourth place in the table. Haines was top-scorer in the next two seasons with 20 goals in 1925–26 when Portsmouth finished in mid-table, and 40 goals from 42 appearances in 1926–27 as Pompey gained promotion to the First Division as runners-up, squeezing out Manchester City on goal average, by a margin of just 0.006. Haines's goal tally included a hat-trick scored in a 9–1 victory over Notts County on 9 April 1927 – this remains Portsmouth's record margin of victory. Going into the final match of the season, Portsmouth and Manchester City were on the same number of points with near identical goal averages. The match between Manchester City and Bradford City had started before Portsmouth's match against Preston North End and finished 8–0. At this time, Portsmouth were also winning 4–1 but needed to score one more goal to take the runners-up spot. Haines managed to score the vital goal in the final minutes of the game, thus sending Portsmouth up by the narrowest of margins.

For Portsmouth's first season in the top flight, Haines shared the goal-scoring with newly recruited Jack Smith, both scoring 11 goals, with fellow forwards David Watson and Welsh international Fred Cook both contributing ten, as they narrowly avoided relegation, finishing in 20th place in the table. By the end of the season, Haines was out of favour with new manager Jack Tinn who was building a team for the future with Jack Weddle taking over the position of centre-forward.

In May 1928, Haines moved up the Solent to join local rivals Southampton. In his six seasons at Fratton Park, Haines scored 129 goals from 179 appearances in all competitions.

=== Southampton ===
At Southampton, Haines joined a club which had been struggling financially and on the pitch. He linked up with his former Portsmouth colleague, Jerry Mackie, and was an immediate success. On 3 November 1928, he scored four goals in an 8–2 victory over Blackpool at The Dell – this was the first four-goal haul since the club had joined the Football League in 1920. Haines' 16 goals were a major factor in the Saints finishing fourth in the Second Division table.

Haines was a "well-built country boy" who soon became as popular at The Dell as he had been at Fratton Park. Despite his build and power, he would often take penalties without a run-up.

In the following season, Haines was injured in September and lost his place at centre-forward to Dick Rowley before returning to the side in February 1930. He marked his return by scoring five goals in the first three matches back and ended the season with 15 goals from 19 appearances. By now, manager Arthur Chadwick was forced to sell players to improve the club's finances, and Rowley had been sold to Tottenham Hotspur in February. At the time of his departure, Rowley had scored 25 goals from 25 league appearances and with him went Saints' last hopes of promotion, and they finished seventh in the table.

Haines missed the first half of the 1930–31 season because of injury, returning to the side on 27 December. Once back in the side, he embarked on a goal-scoring run with seven goals in his first four games and went on to become top scorer for the club with 15 goals from 21 appearances.

In his final season at The Dell, Haines was plagued by injuries and was only able to make three appearances, with various players including Arthur Haddleton and Johnny McIlwaine unsuccessfully trying to replace him at centre-forward before the emergence of Ted Drake from the reserves.

Haines retired in the summer of 1932, having scored a creditable 47 goals from 71 first-team appearances for the Saints.

=== Weymouth ===
In September 1932, he returned to the Western League with Weymouth, for whom he scored 275 goals in 205 appearances. On 16 October 1934, Haines scored his 100th and 101st goals for Weymouth as they beat Newport 2–1, in a replayed FA Cup Tie.

He left Weymouth in 1937 as their all-time top goalscorer.

=== Frome Town ===
Haines ended his career back at Frome Town by scoring three goals in four games for the club in 1937.

== Life after football ==
In 1935, Haines had become the landlord of the Vine Inn, Frome, Somerset which he ran until 1949. He later moved into the dry cleaning business.

In 1960, he became the president of the Portsmouth Supporters Club.

== Career statistics ==
Appearances and goals by club, season, and competition. Only official games are included in this table.
Club	Season	League		FA Cup		Other		Total	
Club	Season	Apps	Goals	Apps	Goals	Apps	Goals	Apps	Goals
Frome	1919–20	13+	14+	0	0	0	0	13+	14+
Frome	1920–21	30+	29+	2	1	0	0	32+	30+
Frome	1921–22	6+	8+	0	0	1	0	7+	8+
Frome	1922–23	13+	25+	0	0	0	0	13+	25+
Frome	Total	62+	76+	2	1	1	0	65+	77+
Portsmouth	1922–23	6	3	0	0	0	0	6	3
Portsmouth	1923–24	30	28	4	4	0	0	34	32
Portsmouth	1924–25	33	17	4	2	0	0	37	19
Portsmouth	1925-26	27	20	3	1	0	0	30	21
Portsmouth	1926–27	42	40	3	3	0	0	45	43
Portsmouth	1927–28	26	11	1	0	0	0	27	11
Portsmouth	Total	164	119	15	10	0	0	179	129
Southampton	1928–29	27	16	1	0	0	0	28	16
Southampton	1929–30	19	15	0	0	0	0	19	15
Southampton	1930–31	21	15	0	0	0	0	21	15
Southampton	1931–32	3	1	0	0	0	0	3	1
Southampton	Total	70	47	1	0	0	0	71	47
Weymouth	1932–33	34	38	1	1	3	1	38	40
Weymouth	1933–34	34	39	2	3	2	1	38	43
Weymouth	1934–35	29	41	6	5	4	4	39	50
Weymouth	1935–36	35	53	2	1	6	7	43	61
Weymouth	1936–37	34	54	1	0	5	7	40	61
Weymouth	Total	166	225	12	9	20	20	198	254
Frome	1937–38	4	3	0	0	0	0	4	3
Total		466	470	37	20	21	20	524	510

== Honours ==
Portsmouth

- Football League Third Division South championship: 1923–24
- Football League Second Division runners-up: 1926–27
