= Dick Rowley =

Irish footballer

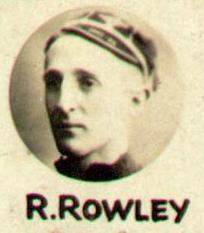

Personal information
- Full name: Richard William Morris Rowley
- Date of birth: 13 January 1904
- Place of birth: Enniskillen, Ireland
- Date of death: 18 April 1984 (aged 80)
- Place of death: Southampton, England
- Height: 6 ft 0 in (1.83 m)
- Positions: Inside forward; centre-forward

Youth career
- Taunton's Grammar School
- Fulwood Barracks

Senior career*
Years	Team	Apps	(Gls)
- Tidworth United
1922–1924	Andover		
1924–1926	Swindon Town	2	(2)
1925	→ Casuals	2	(1)
1926–1930	Southampton	104	(52)
1930–1931	Tottenham Hotspur	24	(10)
1931–1934	Preston North End	51	(14)

International career
1929–1931	Ireland	6	(2)
- * Club domestic league appearances and goals

Richard William Morris Rowley DCM (13 January 1904 – 18 April 1984) was an Irish professional footballer who played as an inside-forward or centre-forward for Southampton, Tottenham Hotspur and Preston North End in the English Football League, as well as representing the Irish national team.

== Early life ==
Rowley was born in Enniskillen, the son of a major in the British army. He moved to Hampshire as a child and was educated at Taunton's Grammar School, Southampton, where he played rugby. During his youth, he excelled at various sports including cricket, golf, tennis, sprinting and hurdling.

Upon joining the armed forces, he served at Fulwood Barracks in Lancashire and Tidworth Camp in Wiltshire, receiving the Distinguished Conduct Medal.

== Club career ==
He played for Andover as an amateur from September 1922, and after scoring a few goals from the wing, he was signed by Swindon Town in November 1924, still retaining his amateur status.

He made his Swindon debut away to Exeter City on 5 April 1926, when he scored twice in a 2–1 victory. His next appearance came a few weeks later, in a 3–2 defeat at Watford. While he was registered with Swindon Town, Rowley also made two appearances in November 1925 for the Casuals amateur team in the Isthmian League, scoring once.

In May 1926, he was signed by Southampton of the Football League Second Division, as a replacement for Arthur Dominy who had joined Everton in the summer. He was initially registered as an amateur, but signed his first professional contract in November 1926.

Described as "a gangly inside-forward", he made his debut at inside left in the opening match of the 1926–27 season. After two matches, he lost his place to Alf Bishop but was recalled, as inside right in October and retained his place for the rest of the season. Rowley soon developed a good relationship with centre-forward Bill Rawlings, as the Saints reached second place in the division by the New Year. After that, the club's fortunes turned and they only managed a further four victories in the league. In the FA Cup, however, five goals each from Rowley and Rawlings helped the Saints reach the semi-finals where they lost 2–1 to Arsenal of the First Division.

Rowley's form attracted interest from several larger clubs, but he remained at The Dell. In 1927–28, he was a regular in the side until December when he lost his place to Charlie Petrie. Rowley was recalled to the side in March, playing at centre-forward, after Rawlings had been sold to Manchester United.

In the following season, with first Petrie and then Herbert Coates being preferred at inside-right, it was not until the end of October that Rowley was once again given a run in the team, this time playing at outside-right. After a few matches at centre-forward, he reverted to inside-right in December, retaining his place for the remainder of the season.

Rowley's best season for the Saints came in 1929–30, when he scored 25 goals from 25 appearances, including hat-tricks in successive matches against Chelsea and Nottingham Forest in September and four goals at Bradford City on 2 November, thus becoming the first Southampton player to score four goals in an away game.

In February 1930, another Second Division club, Tottenham Hotspur made a bid of £3,750 for Rowley which the Southampton board found "irresistible". His spell at Southampton was particularly prolific as he scored 52 goals in his 104 league appearances together with six goals in nine FA Cup matches.

He spent much of his time at White Hart Lane in the reserves and remained at Tottenham until midway through the following season, having scored ten goals in 24 matches.

In December 1931, he was signed by Preston North End (also in the Second Division) for a fee of £5,000, with Ted Harper also making the same move. In Rowley's first full season at Deepdale, Rowley's crosses helped Harper score 37 goals but after Harper was sold to Blackburn Rovers, injuries restricted Rowley's appearances. He was only able to play five times in 1933–34 as Preston gained promotion as runners-up. Rowley retired in the summer of 1934, and was never to play in the First Division.

== International career ==
In the years between 1929 and 1931, he won six caps for Ireland, scoring two goals against Scotland and Wales.

His international debut came in a British Home Championship match against Wales on 2 February 1929 with his first international goal coming three weeks later when he was one of the few Irish players to emerge with any credit from a 7–3 defeat by Scotland. (Some sources credit Ireland's first goal to Rowley, but the match report confirms that this was scored by Joe Bambrick.)

His finest international performance came on 1 February 1930, against Wales at Belfast's Celtic Park, when his passes helped Bambrick score a double hat-trick in a 7–0 victory.

=== International appearances ===
Rowley made six appearances for Ireland in official international matches, as follows:

Date	Venue	Opponent	Result	Goals	Competition
2 February 1929	Racecourse Ground, Wrexham	Wales	2–2	0	British Home Championship
23 February 1929	Windsor Park, Belfast	Scotland	3–7	1	British Home Championship
19 October 1929	Windsor Park, Belfast	England	0–3	0	British Home Championship
1 February 1930	Celtic Park, Belfast	Wales	7–0	0	British Home Championship
22 April 1931	Racecourse Ground, Wrexham	Wales	2–3	1	British Home Championship
19 September 1931	Ibrox Park, Glasgow	Scotland	1–3	0	British Home Championship

Win	Draw	Loss

== Later career ==
In July 1937, Rowley became a coach firstly with Lancashire AFA and later at RAF Uxbridge. In April 1942, he was commissioned as an acting pilot officer, with the rank made permanent in June. In October 1942 he was promoted to flying officer and in January 1946 to flight lieutenant. In May 1955, he was transferred to reserve with the rank of squadron leader.
