= 1929–30 in English football =

Football in England
- Season: 1929–30

Men's football
- Football League: Sheffield Wednesday
- Football League Second Division: Blackpool
- FA Cup: Arsenal

The 1929–30 season was the 55th season of competitive football in England.

== Events ==
The Wednesday officially changed their name to Sheffield Wednesday prior to the start of this season.

Blackpool claimed their only championship to date on the final day of the Division Two season, 3 May, with a goalless draw at Nottingham Forest. Runners-up Chelsea could have won the title themselves the same afternoon if they had won and Blackpool had lost, but the Londoners were defeated at Bury by a single goal. Blackpool forward, Jimmy Hampson, finished the season as the top goal scorer in England, with 46 goals in all competitions.

=== Deaths ===
- 29 September, Joe Schofield—manager of Port Vale and former England international

== Honours ==
Competition	Winner	Runner-up
First Division	Sheffield Wednesday (4)	Derby County
Second Division	Blackpool	Chelsea
Third Division North	Port Vale	Stockport County
Third Division South	Plymouth Argyle	Brentford
FA Cup	Arsenal (1)	Huddersfield Town
Charity Shield	Professionals XI	Amateurs XI
Home Championship	England	Scotland

Notes = Number in parentheses is the times that club has won that honour. * indicates new record for competition

== Football League ==
=== First Division ===
Pos	Team	Pld	W	D	L	GF	GA	GAv	Pts	Relegation
1	Sheffield Wednesday (C)	42	26	8	8	105	57	1.842	60	
2	Derby County	42	21	8	13	90	82	1.098	50	
3	Manchester City	42	19	9	14	91	81	1.123	47	
4	Aston Villa	42	21	5	16	92	83	1.108	47	
5	Leeds United	42	20	6	16	79	63	1.254	46	
6	Blackburn Rovers	42	19	7	16	99	93	1.065	45	
7	West Ham United	42	19	5	18	86	79	1.089	43	
8	Leicester City	42	17	9	16	86	90	0.956	43	
9	Sunderland	42	18	7	17	76	80	0.950	43	
10	Huddersfield Town	42	17	9	16	63	69	0.913	43	
11	Birmingham	42	16	9	17	67	62	1.081	41	
12	Liverpool	42	16	9	17	63	79	0.797	41	
13	Portsmouth	42	15	10	17	66	62	1.065	40	
14	Arsenal	42	14	11	17	78	66	1.182	39	
15	Bolton Wanderers	42	15	9	18	74	74	1.000	39	
16	Middlesbrough	42	16	6	20	82	84	0.976	38	
17	Manchester United	42	15	8	19	67	88	0.761	38	
18	Grimsby Town	42	15	7	20	73	89	0.820	37	
19	Newcastle United	42	15	7	20	71	92	0.772	37	
20	Sheffield United	42	15	6	21	91	96	0.948	36	
21	Burnley (R)	42	14	8	20	79	97	0.814	36	Relegation to the Second Division
22	Everton (R)	42	12	11	19	80	92	0.870	35	Relegation to the Second Division

Rules for classification: 1) Points; 2) Goal average; 3) Goals scored
(C) Champions; (R) Relegated

=== Second Division ===
Pos	Team	Pld	W	D	L	GF	GA	GAv	Pts	Relegation
1	Blackpool (C, P)	42	27	4	11	98	67	1.463	58	Promotion to the First Division
2	Chelsea (P)	42	22	11	9	74	46	1.609	55	Promotion to the First Division
3	Oldham Athletic	42	21	11	10	90	51	1.765	53	
4	Bradford (Park Avenue)	42	19	12	11	91	70	1.300	50	
5	Bury	42	22	5	15	78	67	1.164	49	
6	West Bromwich Albion	42	21	5	16	105	73	1.438	47	
7	Southampton	42	17	11	14	77	76	1.013	45	
8	Cardiff City	42	18	8	16	61	59	1.034	44	
9	Wolverhampton Wanderers	42	16	9	17	77	79	0.975	41	
10	Nottingham Forest	42	13	15	14	55	69	0.797	41	
11	Stoke City	42	16	8	18	74	72	1.028	40	
12	Tottenham Hotspur	42	15	9	18	59	61	0.967	39	
13	Charlton Athletic	42	14	11	17	59	63	0.937	39	
14	Millwall	42	12	15	15	57	73	0.781	39	
15	Swansea Town	42	14	9	19	57	61	0.934	37	
16	Preston North End	42	13	11	18	65	80	0.813	37	
17	Barnsley	42	14	8	20	56	71	0.789	36	
18	Bradford City	42	12	12	18	60	77	0.779	36	
19	Reading	42	12	11	19	54	67	0.806	35	
20	Bristol City	42	13	9	20	61	83	0.735	35	
21	Hull City (R)	42	14	7	21	51	78	0.654	35	Relegation to the Third Division North
22	Notts County (R)	42	9	15	18	54	70	0.771	33	Relegation to the Third Division South

Rules for classification: 1) Points; 2) Goal average; 3) Goals scored
(C) Champions; (P) Promoted; (R) Relegated

=== Third Division North ===
Pos	Team	Pld	W	D	L	GF	GA	GAv	Pts	Promotion
1	Port Vale (C, P)	42	30	7	5	103	37	2.784	67	Promotion to the Second Division
2	Stockport County	42	28	7	7	106	44	2.409	63	
3	Darlington	42	22	6	14	108	73	1.479	50	
4	Chesterfield	42	22	6	14	76	56	1.357	50	
5	Lincoln City	42	17	14	11	83	61	1.361	48	
6	York City	42	15	16	11	77	64	1.203	46	
7	South Shields (Note: After this season, South Shields moved to Gateshead and became Gateshead A.F.C.)	42	18	10	14	77	74	1.041	46	
8	Hartlepools United	42	17	11	14	81	74	1.095	45	
9	Southport	42	15	13	14	81	74	1.095	43	
10	Rochdale	42	18	7	17	89	91	0.978	43	
11	Crewe Alexandra	42	17	8	17	82	71	1.155	42	
12	Tranmere Rovers	42	16	9	17	83	86	0.965	41	
13	New Brighton	42	16	8	18	69	79	0.873	40	
14	Doncaster Rovers	42	15	9	18	62	69	0.899	39	
15	Carlisle United	42	16	7	19	90	101	0.891	39	
16	Accrington Stanley	42	14	9	19	84	81	1.037	37	
17	Wrexham	42	13	8	21	67	88	0.761	34	
18	Wigan Borough	42	13	7	22	60	88	0.682	33	
19	Nelson	42	13	7	22	51	80	0.638	33	
20	Rotherham United	42	11	8	23	67	113	0.593	30	
21	Halifax Town	42	10	8	24	44	79	0.557	28	Re-elected
22	Barrow	42	11	5	26	41	98	0.418	27	Re-elected

Source: rsssf.com
(C) Champions; (P) Promoted

=== Third Division South ===
Pos	Team	Pld	W	D	L	GF	GA	GAv	Pts	Promotion or relegation
1	Plymouth Argyle (C, P)	42	30	8	4	98	38	2.579	68	Promotion to the Second Division
2	Brentford	42	28	5	9	94	44	2.136	61	
3	Queens Park Rangers	42	21	9	12	80	68	1.176	51	
4	Northampton Town	42	21	8	13	82	58	1.414	50	
5	Brighton & Hove Albion	42	21	8	13	87	63	1.381	50	
6	Coventry City	42	19	9	14	88	73	1.205	47	
7	Fulham	42	18	11	13	87	83	1.048	47	
8	Norwich City	42	18	10	14	88	77	1.143	46	
9	Crystal Palace	42	17	12	13	81	74	1.095	46	
10	Bournemouth & Boscombe Athletic	42	15	13	14	72	61	1.180	43	
11	Southend United	42	15	13	14	69	59	1.169	43	
12	Clapton Orient	42	14	13	15	55	62	0.887	41	
13	Luton Town	42	14	12	16	64	78	0.821	40	
14	Swindon Town	42	13	12	17	73	83	0.880	38	
15	Watford	42	15	8	19	60	73	0.822	38	
16	Exeter City	42	12	11	19	67	73	0.918	35	
17	Walsall	42	13	8	21	71	78	0.910	34	
18	Newport County	42	12	10	20	74	85	0.871	34	
19	Torquay United	42	10	11	21	64	94	0.681	31	
20	Bristol Rovers	42	11	8	23	67	93	0.720	30	
21	Gillingham	42	11	8	23	51	80	0.638	30	Re-elected
22	Merthyr Town (R)	42	6	9	27	60	135	0.444	21	Failed re-election and demoted to the Southern League

(C) Champions; (P) Promoted; (R) Relegated

=== Top goalscorers ===
First Division

- Vic Watson (West Ham United) – 41 goals

Second Division

- Jimmy Hampson (Blackpool) – 45 goals

Third Division North

- Frank Newton (Stockport County) – 36 goals

Third Division South

- George Goddard (Queens Park Rangers) – 37 goals
