= List of Bury F.C. players =

For a list of all Bury players with a Wikipedia article, see Category:Bury F.C. players. This is a list of footballers who have played for Bury F.C. who have played 100 or more senior matches for the club.

Appearances and goals are for first-team competitive matches only. Wartime matches are regarded as unofficial and are excluded, as are matches from the abandoned 1939–40 season.

Name	Nationality	Position	Club career	League apps	League goals	Total apps	Total goals	Notes
Billy Barbour	Scotland	DF	1894-1898	101	11	109	11	
Harry Millar	Scotland	FW	1894-1898	109	38	119	47	
Joe Clegg	England	DF	1894-1899	104	6	115	6	
Tommy Davidson	Scotland	DF	1894-1900	116	0	131	0	
George Ross	England	MF	1894-1906	366	10	403	14	
Jack Plant	England	MF	1894-1907	319	57	350	67	
Jack Pray	Scotland	MF	1895-1902	185	8	202	10	
Archie Montgomery	Scotland	GK	1895-1905	210	0	218	0	
Jack Darroch	Scotland	DF	1896-1901	143	1	157	1	
Joe Leeming	England	DF	1897-1908	258	18	280	20	
James McLuckie	Scotland	FW	1898-1901	94	31	106	36	
Charles Sagar	England	FW	1898-1905	186	71	210	90	
Billy Wood	England	FW	1899-1905	189	63	211	70	
Billy Richards	England	MF	1899-1908	233	24	258	27	
Jimmy McEwen	England	DF	1900-1903	102	0	112	0	
Frank Thorpe	England	DF	1901-1906	130	6	143	7	
John Johnston	Scotland	MF	1901-1907	180	2	196	3	
Jimmy Lindsay	England	DF	1901-1910	247	28	272	31	
Jack Dewhurst	England	DF	1905-1911	186	6	196	8	
Tom Kay	England	FW	1905-1914	221	74	231	76	
Billy Humphreys	England	MF	1905-1915	240	1	258	1	
Jimmy Raeside	Scotland	GK	1906-1911	156	3	165	3	
Billy Hibbert	England	FW	1906-1911	178	99	188	105	
Bob Currie	Scotland	FW	1907-1912	116	33	124	35	
Teddy Bullen	England	MF	1907-1915	188	7	199	7	
Tom Millington	England	DF	1908-1914	133	0	143	0	
Chris Duffy	England	MF	1908-1915	145	15	155	17	
Tom McDonald	England	GK	1911-1915	142	0	153	0	
Bob Heap	England	MF	1911-1921	110	3	113	3	
Jock Goldie	Scotland	MF	1912-1920	142	6	153	6	
Billy Peake	England	FW	1912-1922	168	35	181	41	
Bob Perry	Scotland	MF	1912-1923	137	18	148	18	
Jock Allan	Scotland	DF	1913-1922	132	1	141	1	
Fred Heap	England	DF	1919-1929	268	5	281	5	
Ralph Burkinshaw	England	FW	1920-1925	104	19	108	19	
Tommy Adamson	Scotland	DF	1920-1929	271	0	286	0	
Norman Bullock	England	FW	1920-1935	505	125	537	129	
Billy Stage	England	FW	1921-1928	202	33	213	33	
Fred Smith	England	DF	1921-1931	116	4	117	4	
David Robbie	Scotland	MF	1921-1934	420	102	443	109	
Billy Richardson	England	GK	1922-1930	216	0	228	0	
Jimmy Porter	Scotland	MF	1922-1936	396	7	421	8	
Jack Ball	England	FW	1923-1929	203	93	216	99	
Tom Bradshaw	Scotland	DF	1923-1930	208	8	219	8	
Wally Amos	England	MF	1923-1935	455	121	482	131	
Billy Harrison	England	GK	1924-1933	127	0	137	0	
Alick Robinson	England	MF	1927-1933	169	4	181	4	
Les Vernon	England	FW	1927-1934	127	50	137	55	
Tommy Chester	Scotland	DF	1927-1937	249	0	264	0	
George Bradshaw	England	DF	1928-1933	140	1	153	1	
John Smith	Scotland	FW	1928-1933	157	107	169	112	
Arthur Eggleston	England	FW	1931-1935	100	31	107	32	
Billy Whitfield	England	MF	1931-1939	208	13	219	14	
Jimmy Gemmell	England	DF	1931-1939	255	0	272	0	
Willie Chalmers	Scotland	FW	1932-1936	98	23	104	26	
Arthur Buttery	England	FW	1932-1936	104	38	112	39	
George Matthewson	England	DF	1932-1939	213	11	224	11	
Andy Bell	Scotland	DF	1933-1938	111	0	119	0	
Davy Jones	England	MF	1934-1949	257	12	271	15	
Eddie Kilshaw	England	MF	1937-1948	147	17	149	17	
Reg Halton	England	MF	1938-1948	114	19	120	22	
George Bradshaw	England	GK	1938-1950	118	0	122	0	
Les Hart	England	DF	1936-1954	280	2	295	2	
Bill Griffiths	England	DF	1946-1952	193	11	202	12	
George Griffiths	England	DF	1946-1954	239	7	251	7	
Eric Massey	England	DF	1946-1956	201	6	210	6	
Cyril Fairclough	England	DF	1946-1957	191	2	201	2	
Alf Bellis	England	MF	1947-1951	95	18	100	20	
Harry Whitworth	England	MF	1947-1951	112	14	118	16	
Tommy Daniel	England	MF	1947-1958	276	57	290	63	
Les Bardsley	England	MF	1948-1955	200	2	213	3	
George Hazlett	Scotland	MF	1949-1952	100	10	103	11	
Harold Bodle	England	FW	1949-1952	119	40	124	41	
Ken Plant	England	FW	1950-1953	119	54	121	55	
Jimmy Greenhalgh	England	MF	1950-1955	122	1	125	1	
Lewis Goram	Scotland	GK	1950-1957	114	0	115	0	
Walter Kelly	Scotland	FW	1952-1957	159	77	168	79	
Don May	England	MF	1952-1962	134	11	141	11	
Norman Nielson	South Africa	DF	1954-1956	100	5	107	5	
Stan Pearson	England	FW	1954-1957	121	56	128	57	
Johnny Robinson	England	MF	1954-1959	120	21	126	21	
Bobby Conroy	Scotland	DF	1955-1961	217	2	235	2	
Gordon Atherton	England	MF	1955-1964	334	14	368	14	
John McGrath	England	DF	1956-1961	148	2	158	2	
Frank Adams	England	GK	1956-1962	169	0	184	0	
Eddie Robertson	Scotland	DF	1956-1963	196	7	214	7	
Don Watson	England	FW	1957-1961	172	65	184	69	
Harry Bunner	England	DF	1957-1965	105	0	116	0	
Tony Bartley	England	MF	1958-1964	116	24	132	29	
Brian Gallagher	England	DF	1958-1965	130	1	140	1	
Brian Turner	England	MF	1958-1970	455	23	500	25	
Bill Holden	England	FW	1959-1962	100	33	112	36	
Johnny Hubbard	South Africa	MF	1959-1962	109	29	120	32	
Alan Jackson	England	FW	1959-1962	124	43	135	50	
Bill Calder	Scotland	FW	1959-1963	174	67	194	75	
Brian Eastham	England	DF	1959-1967	189	3	213	4	
George Jones	England	FW	1961-1964 1966-1973	319	116	355	131	
Chris Harker	England	GK	1961-1967	178	0	197	0	
Vince Leech	England	DF	1962-1967	111	0	122	0	
Tommy Claxton	England	MF	1963-1969	102	3	111	6	
Alec Lindsay	England	DF	1964-1969	127	13	139	16	
Ray Parry	England	MF	1964-1972	147	17	160	18	
Bobby Owen	England	FW	1965-1968 1977	88	37	100	40	
Jimmy Kerr	Scotland	MF	1965-1970	152	38	168	41	
Roy Parnell	England	MF	1966-1970	97	2	110	2	
Neil Ramsbottom	England	GK	1966-1971	174	0	192	0	
Brian Grundy	England	MF	1967-1971	99	10	107	10	
Hugh Tinney	Scotland	DF	1967-1973	238	3	262	3	
Mike Saile	England	DF	1968-1973	93	0	101	0	
John Forrest	England	GK	1968-1980	430	0	500	0	
David Holt	England	DF	1969-1974	179	9	198	9	
Terry McDermott	England	MF	1970-1973	90	8	101	10	
Jimmy Robson	England	FW	1970-1973	103	3	116	4	
John Connelly	England	MF	1970-1973	129	37	143	38	
Alan Tinsley	England	MF	1970-1974	94	15	107	16	
Billy Rudd	England	MF	1970-1977	189	19	214	20	
John Murray	England	MF	1971-1974	126	37	138	40	
George Hamstead	England	MF	1971-1978	196	29	231	36	
Brian Williams	England	MF	1972-1977	161	18	184	20	
Keith Kennedy	England	DF	1972-1982	405	4	484	6	
Steve Hoolickin	England	DF	1973-1976	140	5	168	5	
Derek Spence	Northern Ireland	FW	1973-1976 1983	153	45	180	56	
John Thomson	England	DF	1973-1978	103	8	122	10	
John Hulme	England	DF	1974-1976	86	5	103	6	
Andy Rowland	England	FW	1974-1978	174	59	204	71	
Tony Bailey	England	DF	1974-1979	131	1	159	1	
Jimmy McIlwraith	Scotland	MF	1975-1980	118	24	143	27	
Wayne Entwistle	England	FW	1976-1977 1983-1985 1988	116	39	132	46	
Billy Tucker	England	DF	1976-1979	96	8	111	8	
Dave Hatton	England	DF	1976-1979	97	2	112	3	
Danny Wilson	England	MF	1977-1980	90	9	108	12	
Alan Whitehead	England	DF	1977-1981	99	13	124	16	
Steve Johnson	England	FW	1977-1983	154	52	184	65	
Paul Hilton	England	DF	1978-1984	148	39	187	46	
Craig Madden	England	FW	1978-1986	297	128	348	153	
Steve Mullen	Scotland	MF	1979-1982	92	5	122	8	
Pat Howard	England	DF	1979-1982	118	5	149	6	
Mick Butler	England	FW	1980-1982	82	15	104	19	
Tommy Gore	England	MF	1980-1983	119	16	137	19	
Joe Jakub	Scotland	MF	1980-1987	265	27	314	34	
David Brown	England	GK	1981-1986	146	0	166	0	
John Bramhall	England	DF	1982-1986	167	17	189	20	
Winston White	England	MF	1983-1987 1992	127	12	147	13	
Terry Pashley	England	DF	1983-1989	217	5	260	5	
Kevin Young	England	MF	1984-1986	88	10	108	13	
Trevor Ross	England	MF	1984-1987	98	11	114	14	
Andy Hill	England	DF	1984-1990	264	10	317	12	
Phil Hughes	Northern Ireland	GK	1985-1987	80	0	103	0	
David Lee	England	MF	1985-1991	208	35	249	40	
Peter Valentine	England	DF	1985-1993	319	16	388	20	
Nigel Greenwood	England	FW	1986-1990	110	25	136	28	
Jamie Hoyland	England	MF	1986-1990	172	35	205	42	
Liam Robinson	England	FW	1986-1993	262	89	315	100	
Sammy McIlroy	Northern Ireland	MF	1987-1989	100	8	122	11	
Simon Farnworth	England	GK	1987-1989	105	0	124	0	
Charlie Bishop	England	DF	1987-1991	114	6	136	7	
Phil Parkinson	England	MF	1988-1992	145	5	169	7	
Alan Knill	Wales	DF	1989-1993	144	9	174	11	
Kevin Hulme	England	MF	1989-1995	139	21	169	26	
Gary Kelly	England	GK	1989-1996	236	0	292	0	
Ronnie Mauge	Trinidad and Tobago	MF	1990-1995	108	10	138	14	
Roger Stanislaus	England	DF	1990-1995	176	5	216	7	
Mark Kearney	England	MF	1991-1993	113	5	129	7	
Ian Stevens	England	FW	1991-1994	110	38	126	42	
Ian Hughes	Wales	DF	1991-1997	160	1	202	2	
Nick Daws	England	MF	1992-2001	369	16	434	23	
Mike Jackson	England	DF	1993-1997	125	9	149	10	
Mark Carter	England	FW	1993-1997	134	62	158	68	
Tony Rigby	England	MF	1993-1999	166	19	198	24	
Lenny Johnrose	England	MF	1993-1999	194	19	232	23	
Chris Lucketti	England	DF	1993-1999	235	8	277	10	Manager of Bury 2017-2018
David Pugh	England	MF	1994-1997	103	28	135	32	
David Johnson	Jamaica	FW	1995-1997	97	18	115	23	
Dean West	England	DF	1995-1999	110	8	132	8	
Andy Woodward	England	DF	1995-1999	115	1	135	1	
Dean Kiely	England	GK	1996-1999	137	0	157	0	
Chris Swailes	England	DF	1997-2001	126	10	146	11	
Adrian Littlejohn	England	FW	1998-2001	99	14	112	16	
Steve Redmond	England	DF	1998-2003	151	6	175	6	
Andy Preece	England	FW	1998-2003	168	27	195	29	Manager of Bury 1999-2003
Chris Billy	England	MF	1998-2003	178	11	198	12	
Danny Swailes	England	DF	1998-2005	164	13	194	14	
Paul Reid	England	MF	1999-2002	110	9	126	10	
Paddy Kenny	Ireland	GK	1999-2002	133	0	150	0	
Martyn Forrest	England	MF	1999-2003	106	2	120	2	
Lee Unsworth	England	DF	2000-2006	151	6	175	6	
Glyn Garner	Wales	GK	2001-2005	126	0	144	0	
Jon Newby	England	FW	2001-2006	155	26	173	29	
David Nugent	England	FW	2002-2005	88	18	102	20	
Colin Woodthorpe	England	DF	2002-2008	181	1	211	2	
Tom Kennedy	England	DF	2003-2007 2014	145	5	161	6	
Dave Flitcroft	England	MF	2004-2006	100	4	108	4	
Dwayne Mattis	Ireland	MF	2004-2006	97	11	109	17	
Dave Challinor	England	DF	2004-2008	173	2	191	4	
Paul Scott	England	DF	2004-2010	213	13	241	16	
Brian Barry-Murphy	Ireland	MF	2004-2010	218	13	245	13	
Nicky Adams	Wales	MF	2005-2008 2014-2015 2018-2019 2024-2025	179	18	209	20	
David Buchanan	Northern Ireland	DF	2005-2010	186	0	215	0	
David Worrall	England	MF	2006 2009-2013	163	11	178	12	
Glynn Hurst	South Africa	FW	2006-2009	114	25	128	28	
Richie Baker	England	MF	2006-2010	107	7	129	8	
Andy Bishop	England	FW	2006-2013	237	69	265	83	
Ben Futcher	England	DF	2007-2011	117	3	136	5	
Stephen Dawson	Ireland	MF	2008-2010 2017-2018	106	6	118	6	
Mike Jones	England	MF	2008-2012	153	20	169	23	
Efe Sodje	Nigeria	DF	2008-2013	196	16	212	18	
Ryan Lowe	England	FW	2009-2011 2014-2018	161	65	180	71	
Steve Schumacher	England	MF	2010-2013	114	23	124	25	
Joe Skarz	England	DF	2010-2013 2017-2018	134	4	152	5	
Tom Soares	England	MF	2012-2017	164	22	187	22	
Craig Jones	Wales	MF	2012-2018	158	8	175	9	
Nathan Cameron	England	DF	2013-2018	126	11	148	14	
Danny Mayor	England	MF	2013-2019	207	30	235	36	
Chris Hussey	England	DF	2014-2016	90	3	103	3	
Andrew Tutte	England	MF	2014-2018	116	9	137	11	
Greg Leigh	Jamaica	DF	2016-2018	86	2	100	3	
Lewis Gilboy	England	FW	2020-2024	86	30	109	37	
Matty Williams	England	DF	2020-2023	93	2	113	2	
Jack Atkinson	Wales	GK	2021-2023	88	0	107	0	
