= 1902–03 FA Cup =

Tournament details
- Country: England; Wales

Final positions
- Champions: Bury (2nd title)
- Runners-up: Derby County

The 1902–03 FA Cup was the 32nd season of the world's oldest association football competition, the Football Association Challenge Cup (more usually known as the FA Cup). Bury won the competition for the second and (as of 2024) final time, beating Derby County 6–0 in the final at Crystal Palace. This scoreline stood as a record victory in an FA Cup final until Manchester City equalled it by beating Watford 6–0 on 18 May 2019.

Matches were scheduled to be played at the stadium of the team named first on the date specified for each round, which was always a Saturday. If scores were level after 90 minutes had been played, a replay would take place at the stadium of the second-named team later the same week. If the replayed match was drawn further replays would be held at neutral venues until a winner was determined. If scores were level after 90 minutes had been played in a replay, a 30-minute period of extra time would be played.

== Calendar ==
The format of the FA Cup for the season had a preliminary round, five qualifying rounds, an intermediate round, three proper rounds, and the semi-finals and final.

Round	Date
Preliminary round	Saturday 20 September 1902
First round qualifying	Saturday 4 October 1902
Second round qualifying	Saturday 18 October 1902
Third round qualifying	Saturday 1 November 1902
Fourth round qualifying	Saturday 15 November 1902
Fifth round qualifying	Saturday 29 November 1902
Intermediate Round	Saturday 13 December 1902
First round proper	Saturday 7 February 1903
Second round proper	Saturday 21 February 1903
Third round proper	Saturday 7 March 1903
Semi-finals	Saturday 21 March 1903
Final	Saturday 18 April 1903

== Intermediate round ==
The Intermediate Round featured ten ties played between the winners from the fifth qualifying round and ten teams given byes. First Division side Middlesbrough was entered into this round, as were Bristol City, Preston North End, Woolwich Arsenal, Burnley and Lincoln City from the Second Division and Reading, Bristol Rovers, West Ham United and Millwall Athletic from the Southern League.

The other Second Division sides had to gain entry to this round through the qualifying rounds. Burton United, Blackpool and Stockport County were entered in the first qualifying round, while Barnsley, Burslem Port Vale, Chesterfield, Doncaster Rovers, Gainsborough Trinity, Glossop, Leicester Fosse and Manchester United were entered in the third qualifying round. Of these, Barnsley, Manchester United, Glossop and Burton United reached the Intermediate Round along with non-league sides Bishop Auckland, Kidderminster Harriers, Luton Town, Brentford, New Brompton and Swindon Town. Brentford qualified for the main competition for the first time, while Swindon Town had not appeared at this stage since losing to Old Brightonians in the first round of the 1887-88 tournament.

The ten matches were played on 13 December 1902. Three matches went to replays, with Millwall Athletic and Bristol Rovers going to a second replay which was held at Villa Park.

Tie no	Home team	Score	Away team	Date
1	Bristol City	3–1	Middlesbrough	13 December 1902
2	Reading	1–0	Burnley	13 December 1902
3	Lincoln City	2–0	West Ham United	13 December 1902
4	Luton Town	3–0	Kidderminster Harriers	13 December 1902
5	Bishop Auckland	1–3	Preston North End	13 December 1902
6	Barnsley	4–0	Swindon Town	13 December 1902
7	Brentford	1–1	Woolwich Arsenal	13 December 1902
Replay	Woolwich Arsenal	5–0	Brentford	17 December 1902
8	Bristol Rovers	2–2	Millwall Athletic	13 December 1902
Replay	Millwall Athletic	0–0	Bristol Rovers	18 December 1902
2nd Replay	Millwall Athletic	2–0	Bristol Rovers	22 December 1902
9	Glossop	2–1	New Brompton	13 December 1902
10	Burton United	1–1	Manchester United	13 December 1902
Replay	Manchester United	3–1	Burton United	17 December 1902

== First round proper ==
The first round proper contained 16 ties between 32 teams. 17 of the 18 First Division sides were given a bye to this round, as were Manchester City and Small Heath from the Second Division, and Southern League teams Southampton, Portsmouth, and Tottenham Hotspur. They joined the ten teams who won in the intermediate round.

The matches were played on Saturday, 7 February 1903. Four matches were drawn, with the replays taking place in the following midweek. One of these, the Notts County v Southampton match, went to a second replay, which Notts County won at Small Heath's St Andrew's ground.

Tie no	Home team	Score	Away team	Date
1	Bury	1–0	Wolverhampton Wanderers	7 February 1903
2	Preston North End	3–1	Manchester City	7 February 1903
3	Notts County	0–0	Southampton	7 February 1903
Replay	Southampton	2–2	Notts County	11 February 1903
2nd Replay	Notts County	2–1	Southampton	16 February 1903
4	Nottingham Forest	0–0	Reading	7 February 1903
Replay	Reading	3–6	Nottingham Forest	12 February 1903
5	Blackburn Rovers	0–0	The Wednesday	7 February 1903
Replay	The Wednesday	0–1	Blackburn Rovers	12 February 1903
6	Aston Villa	4–1	Sunderland	7 February 1903
7	Bolton Wanderers	0–5	Bristol City	7 February 1903
8	Grimsby Town	2–1	Newcastle United	7 February 1903
9	Derby County	2–1	Small Heath	7 February 1903
10	Everton	5–0	Portsmouth	7 February 1903
11	Millwall Athletic	3–0	Luton Town	7 February 1903
12	Woolwich Arsenal	1–3	Sheffield United	7 February 1903
13	Tottenham Hotspur	0–0	West Bromwich Albion	7 February 1903
Replay	West Bromwich Albion	0–2	Tottenham Hotspur	11 February 1903
14	Barnsley	2–0	Lincoln City	7 February 1903
15	Glossop	2–3	Stoke	7 February 1903
16	Manchester United	2–1	Liverpool	7 February 1903

== Second round proper ==
The eight Second Round matches were played on Saturday, 21 February 1903. There was one replay, between Nottingham Forest and Stoke City, played in the following midweek.

Tie no	Home team	Score	Away team	Date
1	Nottingham Forest	0–0	Stoke	21 February 1903
Replay	Stoke	2–0	Nottingham Forest	26 February 1903
2	Aston Villa	4–1	Barnsley	21 February 1903
3	Grimsby Town	0–2	Notts County	21 February 1903
4	Derby County	2–0	Blackburn Rovers	21 February 1903
5	Everton	3–1	Manchester United	21 February 1903
6	Sheffield United	0–1	Bury	21 February 1903
7	Millwall Athletic	4–1	Preston North End	21 February 1903
8	Tottenham Hotspur	1–0	Bristol City	21 February 1903

== Third round proper ==
The four Third Round matches were played on Saturday 7 March 1903. There were no replays.

Tie no	Home team	Score	Away team	Date
1	Bury	1–0	Notts County	7 March 1903
2	Derby County	3–0	Stoke	7 March 1903
3	Millwall Athletic	1–0	Everton	7 March 1903
4	Tottenham Hotspur	2–3	Aston Villa	7 March 1903

== Semi-finals ==
The semi-final matches were played at neutral venues on Saturday 21 March 1903. Bury and Derby County won and went on to meet each other in the final.

21 March 1903
15:00

Bury	3–0	Aston Villa

Goodison Park, Liverpool

21 March 1903
15:00

Derby County	3–0	Millwall Athletic

Villa Park, Birmingham

== Final ==
The Final was contested by Bury and Derby County at Crystal Palace. Bury won 6–0, with goals from George Ross, Charlie Sagar, Joe Leeming (2), William Wood and Jack Plant. The scoreline was a record for the biggest winning margin in the FA Cup final until Manchester City equalled it in 2019.

=== Match details ===
18 April 1903
15:00 GMT

Bury	6–0	Derby County
Ross 20'; Sagar 48'; Leeming 56' 76'; Wood 57'; Plant 59'

Crystal Palace, London
Attendance: 63,102
Referee: J. Adams

Bury	Derby County

== See also ==
- FA Cup Final
