= List of Bury F.C. managers =

English football team managers

Bury Football Club was founded in 1884 and joined the Football League in 1894. In its early years, team management was the responsibility of one or more members of the club committee and the first specialist manager was appointed in 1907. The table below provides a list of all the club's managers to date.

The Bury F.C. website contains a list, drawn from the club's own records, of first team managers from 1890 until David Flitcroft's appointment on 9 December 2013. The page has not been updated since then so all later dates are individually sourced.

Manager	Caretaker manager	From	To	Notes
(England) Tom Hargreaves		1890	1891	Hargreaves was a member of the club committee given matchday charge of the team in 1890–91.
(England) John T. Ingham		1891	1892	Ingham was the club chairman but he acted as team manager in 1891–92, during which Bury won the Lancashire Cup and he originated the club nickname (see above).
(England) Albert Duckworth		1892	1893	Duckworth was a member of the club committee given matchday charge of the team in 1892–93.
unknown		1893	1894	It is possible that more than one member of the club committee was responsible for the team in 1893–94.
(England) Albert Duckworth		1894	1895	For the club's first season in the Football League, sole responsibility reverted to Duckworth. The team won the Second Division championship.
management committee		1895	1907	Management of the team in this period, throughout which Bury were in the First Division, was the responsibility of a three-man committee. According to a Sheffield newspaper report, the committee seems to have included, and may have been headed by, club secretary Harry Spencer Hamer.
(Scotland) Archie Montgomery		1 February 1907	30 April 1915	The committee stepped aside and the first specialist manager was appointed. Montgomery, then aged 34, had been the club's goalkeeper. Like Cameron and Thompson who succeeded him, he was Scottish. Montgomery managed the team in 316 league games, a total beaten only by Dave Russell. The club site says that, technically, Montgomery was the first Bury manager to be sacked but the reason for it was the club's lack of income in wartime so it was effectively a redundancy.
none		1 May 1915	15 May 1919	The position was unfilled for the remainder of World War I.
(Scotland) William S. Cameron		16 May 1919	29 May 1923	Cameron was the club's first player-manager. He was banned from football in 1923 following a match-fixing scandal from three years earlier involving Bury.
(Scotland) James Hunter-Thompson		11 June 1923	10 February 1927	Hunter-Thompson was the first Bury manager to be sacked because of poor results. The team finished nineteenth in 1926–27, narrowly avoiding relegation.
(England) Percy J. Smith		24 May 1927	4 January 1930	Smith left to take over at Tottenham Hotspur.
(England) Arthur Paine		7 January 1930	29 December 1935	Arthur Paine joined Bury in 1923 as club secretary, but then served as team manager for nearly six years before reverting to secretary. Through the Second World War, he took additional employment as a company secretary in industry and decided after the war to remain there permanently. He resigned his job with Bury on 1 July 1946.
(England) Norman Bullock		30 December 1935	21 June 1938	Bullock played for Bury as a forward from 1920 to 1935, representing England three times. He became a coach and then team manager after he retired from playing. He left to take over at Chesterfield.
(England) Charlie Dean		21 June 1938	14 March 1944	The club website does not name a manager in this period and it is possible that Dean was appointed on a temporary or part-time basis. He is listed by Soccerbase as manager from June 1938 to March 1944. The club site confirms the exact dates of Bullock's departure and Porter's appointment.
(Scotland) Jimmy Porter		14 March 1944	14 June 1945	Porter played for Bury as a wing half from 1921 to 1935 and then became a coach. He appears to have been a stand-in as wartime manager because he stepped aside in June 1945 to become assistant manager on Norman Bullock's return. In 1949, Porter became manager at Accrington Stanley for two years.
(England) Norman Bullock		15 June 1945	30 November 1949	Bullock's second term as Bury manager. He was the first Bury manager to be given sole responsibility for team selection. He left to become manager of Leicester City.
(Scotland) Johnny McNeil		30 March 1950	28 November 1953	Formerly manager of Torquay United. McNeil left Bury for health reasons.
(Scotland) Dave Russell		1 December 1953	13 December 1961	Russell managed the team in 352 league games, more than any other manager. Bury were Third Division champions under him in 1960–61. He left to take over at Tranmere Rovers.
(England) Bob Stokoe		13 December 1961	11 August 1965	After Cameron and Bullock, Stokoe was the club's third player-manager. He left to take over at Charlton Athletic.
(England) Bert Head		16 August 1965	10 April 1966	Head left to take over at Crystal Palace.
(England) Les Shannon		11 July 1966	29 May 1969	Shannon managed the club's 1967–68 immediate re-promotion to the Second Division. He left to take over at Blackpool.
(England) Jack Marshall		1 July 1969	16 September 1969	Marshall was in charge for a mere seven games before being sacked and his term was the shortest of any Bury manager.
(England) Les Hart		16 September 1969	17 September 1970	Hart was only the third Bury manager to be sacked for poor results and there have been several more sackings since then.
	(England) Colin McDonald	17 September 1970	10 November 1970	A local man whose career as a goalkeeper was mostly with Burnley. He held an executive post with Bury after he retired from playing and agreed to stand in as temporary team manager after Hart's dismissal, until McAnearney's appointment. He was afterwards the club's general manager for a time.
(Scotland) Tommy McAnearney		10 November 1970	8 May 1972	McAnearney left to take over at Aldershot.
(Scotland) Allan Brown		20 June 1972	19 December 1973	Brown left to take over at Nottingham Forest where, until 3 January 1975, he was Brian Clough's predecessor.
(England) Bobby Smith		19 December 1973	17 November 1977	Won promotion from Fourth Division in 1974. Sacked.
(England) Bob Stokoe		17 November 1977	21 May 1978	Stokoe's second term at Bury. He left to take over at Blackpool.
(England) Dave Hatton		1 June 1978	30 October 1979	Arrived as player-manager. Sacked.
(England) Dave Connor		9 November 1979	13 June 1980	Sacked.
(England) Jim Iley		1 July 1980	14 February 1984	Sacked.
(England) Martin Dobson		14 March 1984	1 April 1989	Arrived as player-manager. Won promotion from Fourth Division in 1985. Sacked.
(England) Sam Ellis		16 May 1989	11 December 1990	Ellis left to take over at Manchester City.
(England) Mike Walsh		11 December 1990	4 September 1995	Sacked.
(England) Stan Ternent		18 September 1995	30 May 1998	Arguably the club's most successful manager as he led the team to successive promotions from fourth tier to third in 1995–96 and, as champions, from third to second in 1996–97. He left to take over at Burnley.
(England) Neil Warnock		16 June 1998	2 December 1999	Warnock left to take over at Sheffield United.
	(England) Andy Preece & (England) Steve Redmond	3 December 1999	1 June 2000	Preece and Redmond shared management duties after Warnock departed until Preece was formally appointed.
(England) Andy Preece		1 June 2000	16 December 2003	Initially player-manager. Sacked.
(England) Graham Barrow		16 December 2003	19 September 2005	Sacked.
(England) Chris Casper		19 September 2005	14 January 2008	Sacked.
	(England) Chris Brass	15 January 2008	4 February 2008	
(England) Alan Knill		4 February 2008	31 March 2011	Knill left to take over at Scunthorpe United.
	(England) Richie Barker	1 April 2011	1 June 2011	Secured the club's 2010–11 promotion in the last month of the season.
(England) Richie Barker		14 June 2011	7 August 2012	Barker left to take over as manager of Crawley Town.
	(England) Peter Shirtliff	7 August 2012	26 September 2012	Shirtliff was the first-team coach and filled the gap between Barker and Blackwell as the 2012–13 season began.
(England) Kevin Blackwell		26 September 2012	14 October 2013	Sacked.
	(England) Ronnie Jepson	14 October 2013	9 December 2013	Jepson was on a short-term caretaker contract which ended early when Flitcroft was appointed.
(England) David Flitcroft		9 December 2013	16 November 2016	Won promotion from League Two in 2015. Sacked.
(England) Chris Brass		15 December 2016	15 February 2017	Brass was on a short-term contract as head coach, not manager as such, and this was terminated early when Lee Clark became available.
(England) Lee Clark		15 February 2017	30 October 2017	Sacked.
	(England) Ryan Lowe	30 October 2017	22 November 2017	
(England) Chris Lucketti		22 November 2017	15 January 2018	Sacked.
	(England) Ryan Lowe	15 January 2018	10 May 2018	
(England) Ryan Lowe		10 May 2018	5 June 2019	Having won promotion to League One, accepted offer to manage Plymouth Argyle.
(England) Paul Wilkinson		2 July 2019	c. November 2019	Formerly caretaker manager at Truro City. It is understood that Wilkinson left several weeks after the club was expelled from the EFL.
(England) Andy Welsh		29 July 2020	17 September 2023	On 5 June 2023, upon the merger of Bury F.C. and Bury A.F.C., the two team's histories were combined — retroactively counting A.F.C's seasons as seasons for Bury F.C. and also retroactively counting Welsh as Bury F.C. manager since 29 July 2020.
(England) Dave McNabb		26 September 2023	2 December 2025	Stepped down as manager to take up a new role as head of football operations
	(England) Tim Lees	2 December 2025	12 December 2025	
(England) Michael Jolley		12 December 2025	14 December 2025	Left by mutual consent after unrest about Jolley's past conviction for a sex offence.
	(England) Tim Lees	14 December 2025	11 February 2026	Returned to his duty as assistant manager at Bury
(England) Anthony Johnson		11 February 2026	Present	
