= 1899–1900 FA Cup =

Tournament details
- Country: England; Wales

Final positions
- Champions: Bury (1st title)
- Runners-up: Southampton

The 1899–1900 FA Cup was the 29th staging of the world's oldest association football competition, the Football Association Challenge Cup (more usually known as the FA Cup), and the last to be held fully in the 19th century. The cup was won by Bury, who defeated Southampton 4–0 in the final of the competition, played at Crystal Palace in London.

Matches were scheduled to be played at the stadium of the team named first on the date specified for each round, which was always a Saturday. If scores were level after 90 minutes had been played, a replay would take place at the stadium of the second-named team later the same week. If the replayed match was drawn further replays would be held at neutral venues until a winner was determined. If scores were level after 90 minutes had been played in a replay, a 30-minute period of extra time would be played.

== Calendar ==
The format of the FA Cup for the season had a preliminary round, five qualifying rounds, three proper rounds, and the semi-finals and final.

Round	Date
Preliminary round	Saturday, 16 September 1899
First Qualifying round	Saturday, 30 September 1899
Second Qualifying round	Saturday, 14 October 1899
Third Qualifying round	Saturday, 28 October 1899
Fourth Qualifying round	Saturday, 18 November 1899
Fifth Qualifying round	Saturday, 9 December 1899
First round proper	Saturday, 27 January 1900
Second round	Saturday, 10 February 1900
Third round	Saturday, 24 February 1900
Semifinals	Saturday, 24 March 1900
Final	Saturday, 21 April 1900

== Qualifying rounds ==
17 of the 18 Football League First Division sides received byes to the first round, as did The Wednesday and Bolton Wanderers from the Second Division and Southampton, Bristol City and Tottenham Hotspur from the Southern League. First Division Glossop and 13 of the other Second Division sides were entered into the third qualifying round while Gainsborough Trinity and Chesterfield were entered into the first qualifying round and New Brighton Tower was entered into the preliminary round.

Of the qualifying League clubs, only Grimsby Town, Walsall and Leicester Fosse progressed to the main competition along with non-league sides Jarrow, Chorley, Stalybridge Rovers, Queens Park Rangers, Reading, Portsmouth and Millwall Athletic. Chorley, Stalybridge Rovers, QPR and future Cup champions Portsmouth were featuring at this stage for the first time.

== First round proper ==
The first round proper contained sixteen ties between 32 teams. The matches were played on Saturday, 27 January 1900. Six matches were drawn, with the replays taking place in the following midweek fixture. The Blackburn/Portsmouth match went to a second replay, which was played the following week at Villa Park.

Tie no	Home team	Score	Away team	Date
1	Jarrow	0–2	Millwall Athletic	27 January 1900
2	Bristol City	2–1	Stalybridge Rovers	27 January 1900
3	Burnley	0–1	Bury	27 January 1900
4	Preston North End	1–0	Tottenham Hotspur	27 January 1900
5	Southampton	3–0	Everton	27 January 1900
6	Stoke	0–0	Liverpool	27 January 1900
Replay	Liverpool	1–0	Stoke	1 February 1900
7	Walsall	1–1	West Bromwich Albion	27 January 1900
Replay	West Bromwich Albion	6–1	Walsall	1 February 1900
8	Notts County	6–0	Chorley	27 January 1900
9	Nottingham Forest	3–0	Grimsby Town	27 January 1900
10	The Wednesday	1–0	Bolton Wanderers	27 January 1900
11	Derby County	2–2	Sunderland	27 January 1900
Replay	Sunderland	3–0	Derby County	31 January 1900
12	Sheffield United	1–0	Leicester Fosse	27 January 1900
13	Newcastle United	2–1	Reading	27 January 1900
14	Manchester City	1–1	Aston Villa	27 January 1900
Replay	Aston Villa	3–0	Manchester City	31 January 1900
15	Queens Park Rangers	1–1	Wolverhampton Wanderers	27 January 1900
Replay	Wolverhampton Wanderers	0–1	Queens Park Rangers	31 January 1900
16	Portsmouth	0–0	Blackburn Rovers	27 January 1900
Replay	Blackburn Rovers	1–1	Portsmouth	1 February 1900
Replay	Blackburn Rovers	5–0	Portsmouth	5 February 1900

== Second round proper ==
The eight second-round matches were scheduled for Saturday, 10 February 1900, although only three games were played on this date. The other five games were played the following Saturday. There were three replays, played in the following midweek fixture.

Tie no	Home team	Score	Away team	Date
1	Liverpool	1–1	West Bromwich Albion	17 February 1900
Replay	West Bromwich Albion	2–1	Liverpool	21 February 1900
2	Preston North End	1–0	Blackburn Rovers	17 February 1900
3	Southampton	4–1	Newcastle United	17 February 1900
4	Notts County	0–0	Bury	10 February 1900
Replay	Bury	2–0	Notts County	14 February 1900
5	Nottingham Forest	3–0	Sunderland	10 February 1900
6	Aston Villa	5–1	Bristol City	10 February 1900
7	Sheffield United	1–1	The Wednesday	17 February 1900
Replay	The Wednesday	0–2	Sheffield United	19 February 1900
8	Queens Park Rangers	0–2	Millwall Athletic	17 February 1900

The Southampton v. Newcastle United match was originally played on 10 February but was abandoned after 55 minutes due to a heavy snowstorm. The Sheffield derby attended by a crowd of 40,000 was also abandoned because of the snow in the second half.

== Third round proper ==
The four quarter final matches were scheduled for Saturday, 24 February 1900. Three of the four matches were replayed in the following midweek fixture, with the Millwall Athletic – Aston Villa match going to a second replay at Elm Park the following week.

Tie no	Home team	Score	Away team	Date
1	Preston North End	0–0	Nottingham Forest	24 February 1900
Replay	Nottingham Forest	1–0	Preston North End	28 February 1900
2	Southampton	2–1	West Bromwich Albion	24 February 1900
3	Sheffield United	2–2	Bury	24 February 1900
Replay	Bury	2–0	Sheffield United	1 March 1900
4	Millwall Athletic	1–1	Aston Villa	24 February 1900
Replay	Aston Villa	0–0	Millwall Athletic	28 February 1900
Replay	Millwall Athletic	2–1	Aston Villa	5 March 1900

== Semifinals ==
The semi-final matches were both played on Saturday, 24 April 1900. Both matches went to replays, played the following Wednesday or Thursday. Bury and Southampton came through the semi-finals to meet in the final at Crystal Palace.

24 March 1900

Bury	1–1	Nottingham Forest

Victoria Ground, Stoke

Replay

29 March 1900

Bury	3–2	Nottingham Forest

Bramall Lane, Sheffield

24 March 1900

Southampton	0–0	Millwall Athletic

Crystal Palace, London

Replay

28 March 1900

Southampton	3–0	Millwall Athletic

Elm Park, Reading

== Final ==
The final took place on Saturday, 21 April 1900 at Crystal Palace. Just under 69,000 supporters attended the match. Jasper McLuckie opened the scoring for Bury after about 9 minutes. Willie Wood doubled the advantage seven minutes later, before McLuckie added a third seven minutes after that. Jack Plant scored the fourth and final goal in the eightieth minute, to cap a good victory for the northern side.

=== Match details ===
21 April 1900
15:00 GMT

Bury	4 – 0	Southampton
McLuckie 9' 23'; Wood 16'; Plant 80'

Crystal Palace, London
Attendance: 68,985
Referee: Arthur Kingscott (Derby)

Bury	Southampton

== See also ==
- FA Cup final results 1872-
