= 1900 FA Cup final =

British association football match

1900 FA Cup Final
- Event: 1899–1900 FA Cup
Bury	Southampton
4	0
- Date: 21 April 1900
- Venue: Crystal Palace, London
- Referee: Arthur Kingscott (Long Eaton, Derbyshire)
- Attendance: 68,945
- Weather: hot and dry

The 1900 FA Cup final was an association football match between Bury and Southampton on Saturday, 21 April 1900 at the Crystal Palace stadium in south London. It was the final match of the 1899–1900 FA Cup, the 29th edition of the world's oldest football knockout competition, and England's primary cup competition, the Football Association Challenge Cup, better known as the FA Cup.

Bury and Southampton were both appearing in their first finals. Both teams joined the competition in the first round proper and progressed through four rounds to the final. As a member of the Football League First Division, Bury were exempt from the competition's qualifying phase. Southampton, as a member of the Southern League would normally have been required to pre-qualify but, as champions of the Southern League for three seasons in succession from 1896–97 to 1898–99, they were given byes through the qualifying phase to the first round.

The final was played in a heat wave and watched by a crowd of 68,945. Bury, leading 3–0 at half-time, dominated the match to win 4–0 with goals by Jasper McLuckie (2), Willie Wood and Jack Plant. When the game ended, the FA Cup trophy was presented to Bury's captain Jack Pray by Lord James of Hereford. Winning the cup proved to be profitable for Bury as the club's debts of £1,230 were converted into a credit balance of £1,329. Bury won the cup again in 1903 but that was their last appearance in the match. Southampton reached the 1902 final but were defeated by Sheffield United; they eventually won the cup in 1976.

== Background ==
The FA Cup, known officially as The Football Association Challenge Cup, is an annual knockout association football competition in men's domestic English football. The competition was first proposed on 20 July 1871 by C. W. Alcock at a meeting of The Football Association committee. The tournament was first played in the 1871–72 season and is the world's oldest association football competition. The 1900 match between Bury and Southampton at Crystal Palace was the 29th final and the last of the 19th century. Both teams were appearing in the final for the first time.

Bury were members of the Football League First Division and, in the 1899–1900 league championship, amassed 32 points to finish in 12th position, only five points clear of the relegation placings. Southampton were members of the Southern League and had been its champions in each of the three previous seasons. In the 1899–1900 Southern League championship, they had slipped to third place below new champions Tottenham Hotspur. Southern League teams normally had to qualify for the first round proper of the FA Cup but, as reigning champions of their league, Southampton were exempted from pre-qualification and were given byes to the first round.

Bury's team between 1895 and 1907 was selected by a three-man committee but with club secretary Harry Spencer Hamer in charge of the team on match days. Southampton's club secretary Ernest Arnfield took charge of their team on match days.

== Route to the final ==
=== Bury ===
Round	Opposition	Score
First	Burnley (a)	1–0
Second	Notts County (a)	0–0
Second (replay)	Notts County (h)	2–0
Third	Sheffield United (a)	2–2
Third (replay)	Sheffield United (h)	2–0
Semi-final	Nottingham Forest (n)	1–1
Semi-final (replay)	Nottingham Forest (n)	3–2
Key: (h) = home venue; (a) = away venue; (n) = neutral venue. Source:

Bury entered the competition in the first round proper and played seven matches, including three replays, en route to the final. All four of their opponents were other teams in the First Division.

==== Early rounds ====
In the first round on Saturday, 27 January, Bury were drawn away to Burnley, who were relegated at the end of the 1899–1900 league season. Bury won the tie 1–0 with a goal by Charlie Sagar before a crowd of 6,020 at Turf Moor.

In the second round on Saturday, 10 February, Bury drew 0–0 away to Notts County at Trent Bridge. Four days later, on the 14th, the replay at Gigg Lane was watched by a crowd estimated as over 4,400. Goals by Sagar and Willie Wood ensured a 2–0 victory.

Bury were drawn away again in the third round to the FA Cup holders Sheffield United at Bramall Lane. On Saturday, 24 February, Bury held United to a 2–2 draw in front of 22,766 people, their goals scored by Jasper McLuckie and Wood. Sheffield's goalscorers were Fred Priest and Ernest Needham with a penalty.

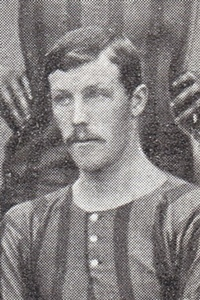
Bury fullback Tommy Davidson, pictured in 1903

The replay took place the following Thursday, 1 March, and local interest soared. A new attendance record was set at Gigg Lane with 20,139 cramming into the ground. It is believed that many more people broke in without paying or managed to watch by climbing the overlooking trees outside. Bury won the match 2–0 with goals by Jack Plant and Billy Richards.

==== Semi-final ====
The semi-finals were staged at neutral venues on Saturday, 24 March, and Bury were drawn to play Nottingham Forest, the only other First Division team left in the competition, at the Victoria Ground in Stoke-on-Trent. The Times report criticised both teams for a poor match in which "hard kicking and rushing marked the play throughout" and said that the 20,000 spectators gained no satisfaction from a game in which there was "no short passing". Team captain Jack Pray scored a fifteenth-minute penalty but the match ended in a 1–1 draw after a second penalty was missed and Arthur Capes scored for Forest. For the third time in this cup run, a replay was required, this time at Bramall Lane.

The crowd in Sheffield on 29 March was 11,200 but it was estimated that only 400 or so Bury supporters were able to make the trip as it was a Thursday evening. They were rewarded by seeing their team recover from a 2–0 deficit to win the match 3–2 after extra time. The Times reported that conditions were poor because of "bad light and slippery turf" but the match was nevertheless "a singularly interesting contest". Bury arrived late and had to rush onto the field. This had an unsettling effect and Forest scored twice through Capes and John Calvey in the first two minutes. It seemed as if Forest's success was assured but Bury worked hard to prevent any more Forest goals before half-time. Forest continued to be the better team in the early part of the second half but the Bury forwards, led by Sagar, began to cause problems and Sagar himself pulled a goal back midway through the half. With less than five minutes remaining, McLuckie scored the equaliser and it was 2–2 at the end of normal time. The rule in this match, being a replay, was that extra time must be played but the Forest players, perhaps not knowing this, made a protest. With less than ten minutes of extra time remaining, Sagar scored his second goal to secure a 3–2 win and take Bury to their first FA Cup final. The Times praised Bury for "their pluck in an uphill game".

=== Southampton ===
Round	Opposition	Score
First	Everton (h)	3–0
Second	Newcastle United (h)	MA
Second (replay)	Newcastle United (h)	4–1
Third	West Bromwich Albion (h)	2–1
Semi-final	Millwall Athletic (n)	0–0
Semi-final (replay)	Millwall Athletic (n)	3–0
Key: (h) = home venue; (a) = away venue; (n) = neutral venue. MA = match abandoned. Source:

Southampton entered the competition in the first round proper and played six matches, including two replays, en route to the final. Three of their opponents were in the First Division and one was in the Southern League. Whereas Bury were drawn away in each of the first three rounds, Southampton were always drawn at home.

==== Early rounds ====
In their first-round match at The Dell on 27 January, they faced First Division Everton and won 3–0 before a 10,000 crowd. Two of their goals were scored by former Everton player Alf Milward, the other by Archie Turner.

In the second round, Southampton hosted First Division Newcastle United whom they had defeated at the same stage two years earlier. This match was played on Saturday, 10 February, in wintry conditions. With the match goalless, Jack Farrell was forced to leave the pitch with a dislocated left collar-bone. Southampton played on with ten men until the 50th minute when referee Arthur Kingscott abandoned the match because of a heavy snowstorm. The sides met again the following Saturday before an 8,000 crowd. Roddy McLeod replaced the injured Farrell and scored twice in a convincing 4–1 victory. The other two goals were scored by Jimmy Yates and Archie Turner. The Newcastle goal was scored by Jack Peddie.

The third-round match was played only a week later, 24 February, against West Bromwich Albion, another First Division side. Turner and McLeod scored in a 2–1 victory. The Albion goalscorer was Chippy Simmons. The crowd was 9,000. The Times briefly reported that Southampton played "very good football" and the result was not unexpected.

==== Semi-final ====
The semi-finals involved two teams in the First Division and two in the Southern League. The draw kept the leagues apart and guaranteed that a side from the Southern League would reach an FA Cup final for the first time. Southampton's opponents were Millwall Athletic, who had just defeated Football League champions Aston Villa in the second replay of their third round tie which Dave Juson and David Bull have described as "three epic confrontations".

To prepare for the semi-final, the Southampton players were sent to Buxton, a spa town, for a week's special training which began with a morning walk followed by a bath. The club secretary, Ernest Arnfield, explained the training routine to Chums magazine:

... in the afternoon, sprinting and ball-kicking are the order. Baths are capital for removing stiffness from the joints. And ... everyone in training should go to bed early. Our fellows usually retire at ten, but the night before a big match they are all in bed by nine. They enjoy a long sleep, and don't appear for breakfast before nine. Our diet is an extremely plain one. The customary fare consists of fish, chops and steaks. Vegetables and sweets are banned when a match is about to be played and so are spirits. Half a pint of beer per meal, however, is allowed, and directly the match is over, the players can eat whatever they please. As regards smoking, we only prohibit it on the morning preceding a big match.

The semi-final was played on Saturday, 24 March at the Crystal Palace stadium, which was also the venue for the final, and a crowd of 34,760 watched a goalless draw. The Times noted that the success thus far of two southern teams had aroused additional interest as the crowd was much larger than expected, but they were disappointed by seeing "cup-tie football of the worst description". There were few scoring chances and too many fouls. The newspaper hoped to see much better football in the replay.

The replay was the following Wednesday, 28 March, at Reading's Elm Park when a crowd of only 10,000 saw Alf Milward score two goals and Jimmy Yates one in a 3–0 victory which put Southampton through to their first appearance in the final. The Times reporter had his wish granted because it was a much better and more sporting game than the first match and Southampton won on "absolute merit".

== Match ==
=== Pre-match ===
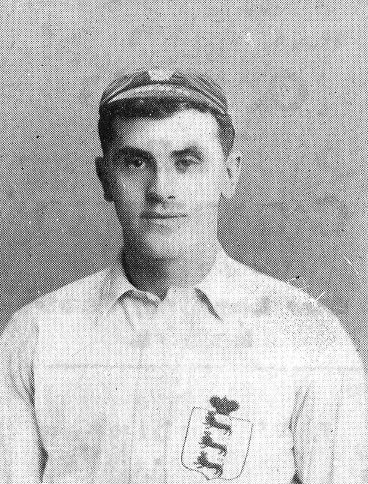
Jack Robinson, Southampton's international goalkeeper

The Bury team and officials travelled to London on Thursday, 19 April, two days before the match. They stayed at the Tavistock Hotel in Covent Garden until the Monday following. Southampton, however, did not travel until the Saturday morning. There had been unusually sunny weather that April and The Manchester Guardian predicted that it would continue through Saturday with the high temperature "sure to have a prejudicial effect on the game". Their forecast was correct as there was a heatwave in London on matchday and conditions were uncomfortable for both the players and the crowd of 68,945.

The Manchester Guardian had predicted a large crowd in view of the "keen interest" taken in a match between teams representing northern and southern football. According to one report, most of the crowd were "rooting" for Southampton, who were the first southern team to reach the final since the Old Etonians in 1883. The referee, Arthur Kingscott from Derbyshire, had officiated Southampton's game against Newcastle in the second round. Bury won the toss and decided to kick off with the sun behind them. The two teams were unchanged from those listed in The Manchester Guardian's pre-match report.

=== First half ===
In its match report next day, The Observer says Bury began attacking immediately and The Times ascribes their eventual success to the method of the half-backs (Pray, Joe Leeming and George Ross) in feeding their own forwards and killing the Southampton game. From the start, the Bury forwards directed high crosses into the goalmouth to test the Southampton goalkeeper, Jack Robinson. Although Southampton kept things even at first, their first mistake was by Peter Durber who allowed Richards to force a corner. This was taken by Plant whose cross was converted by McLuckie into the first goal, scored after nine minutes of play. The Observer says that, although Southampton tried hard to make amends, they failed against "a clever and determined defence".

Bury had most of the play and Robinson was kept busy in the Southampton goal. After 16 minutes, he saved a shot from Plant but deflected the ball to Willie Wood who scored the second goal. The Observer says that Southampton were then a beaten team whose players were holding the ball too long with no certainty in their movement. The Bury backs and halves always broke up the Southampton attacks and the Bury forwards were always dangerous. Robinson made two saves but the match was over as a contest when McLuckie scored his second goal after 23 minutes. This goal was described by The Observer as "a piece of brilliant play". Receiving a pass from Ross, McLuckie steadied himself and aimed a long, low shot into the corner of the net which beat Robinson and his two full backs. Southampton had a fair amount of possession to half-time but The Observer says they never looked like scoring.

=== Second half ===
In the second half, Southampton tried to recover and played better with the sun and breeze behind them but Bury had eased off and the pace of the game slackened. The Times report says there was, at times, some evenness in the play though Bury with a clear lead "played with a certain amount of leisure". Milward and Harry Wood both had attempts on goal for Southampton, but to no avail. Even so, Bury's forwards still seemed the more likely to score and McLuckie was especially prominent. The Observer praised Robinson's performance as he displayed coolness and resource to prevent any more goals until ten minutes from full-time. Bury then scored the fourth and final goal after Robinson had parried a shot from Pray over the crossbar for another corner. This was taken quickly by Richards to Plant, who hit a hard shot along the ground which Robinson could not stop.

There was a misunderstanding near the end when many in the crowd thought the referee had blown his whistle for full-time. They ran onto the pitch and play was delayed for a few minutes while order was restored. According to Philip Gibbons, Bury's 4–0 win was a "football lesson" for the Southampton players. Even so, The Manchester Guardian said in its report on Monday morning that Robinson was "undoubtedly the hero of the match". The report says he made several outstanding saves and, without him, Southampton would have suffered a massive defeat. On the Bury side, the Manchester Guardian reporter praised McLuckie for putting in "some fine play", especially when he scored his second goal. The report says that Sagar and Plant were always dangerous in attack and Tommy Davidson was the best of the Bury defenders.

=== Details ===
21 April 1900
15:00 GMT

Bury	4–0	Southampton
McLuckie 9, 23'; Wood 16'; Plant 80'

Crystal Palace, London
Attendance: 68,945
Referee: Arthur Kingscott (Long Eaton)

Bury	Southampton

GK	(England) Fred Thompson
RB	(Scotland) Johnny Darroch
LB	(Scotland) Tommy Davidson
RH	(Scotland) Jack Pray (c)
CH	(England) Joe Leeming
LH	(England) George Ross
RW	(England) Billy Richards
IR	(England) Willie Wood
CF	(Scotland) Jasper McLuckie
IL	(England) Charlie Sagar
LW	(England) Jack Plant
Club secretary:
(England) Harry Spencer Hamer

GK	(England) Jack Robinson
RB	(Scotland) Peter Meechan
LB	(England) Peter Durber
RH	(Scotland) Samuel Meston
CH	(England) Arthur Chadwick
LH	(Scotland) Bob Petrie
RW	(England) Archie Turner
IR	(England) Jimmy Yates
CF	(England) Jack Farrell (c)
IL	(England) Harry Wood
LW	(England) Alf Milward
Club secretary:
(England) Er Arnfield

Match rules

- 90 minutes duration (two halves of 45 minutes each; teams change ends at half-time). (Note: The duration of a football match has been 90 minutes since an agreement in 1866 for the match between London and Sheffield.)
- No extra time if scores level at end of normal time. (Note: The FA introduced the option of extra time into its rules in 1897.) Result to be settled by replay at a later date. (Note: The 1875 final was the first in which a replay took place; this method of deciding the winners continued until 1999. The 2005 final was the first to be settled by penalty shoot-out.)
- No substitutes allowed. (Note: Although there were isolated instances of substitution in earlier times, it was not until the beginning of the 1965–66 season that substitutes were first allowed in English top-class matches, and then only for replacement of injured players.)

Notes

- Players are listed above according to their positions on the field. There was no shirt numbering in 1900. (Note: The first known instance of shirt numbering in English football was in March 1914. It was not until the 1939–40 season that a numbering system was formally introduced.)

Key to positions

- GK = goalkeeper
- RB = right back; LB = left back
- RH = right half; CH = centre half; LH = left half
- RW = right winger; IR = inside right; CF = centre forward; IL = inside left; LW = left winger

== Post-match ==
Bury's former club president, Lord James of Hereford, presented the trophy to captain Jack Pray at the end of the game. James made a speech recorded in both The Observer and The Times and began by saying it was a great honour to present the cup to the Bury team. Pray responded by asking his players to "give three hearty cheers for (Southampton)". Also present as a guest of honour was Lord Rosebery, the former prime minister, who made a speech in which he commiserated with Southampton goalkeeper Jack Robinson for "a gallant uphill fight against overwhelming odds".

Bury later reported that their cup final earnings amounted to £938 16s 6d with a further £350 1s 6d from their two semi-final games. The club had been struggling financially for the last two years so this was much-needed revenue. As the season ended, the club's debts of £1,230 had become a credit balance of £1,329. Bury's success did not entirely impress the town's local newspaper, the Bury Times, which only mentioned their cup final victory on an inside page. The reporter complained: "Bury's Cup win was only some consolation for their poor League performance this season". Bury had finished twelfth in the First Division.

In its report, The Times praised Bury for playing "splendid football" but expressed disappointment with Southampton who were "outclassed". The reporter twice made the error of referring to a Southampton victory over Aston Villa in the third round but it was Millwall who defeated Villa; Southampton then defeated Millwall in the semi-final.

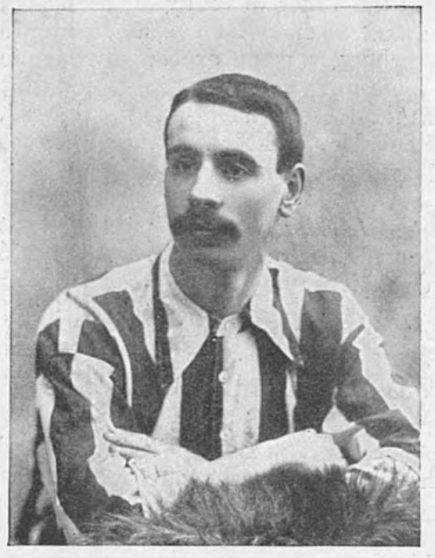
Southampton captain Jack Farrell, pictured in 1897

Reporting on the match, the Southampton correspondent for Athletic News described the team's performance as "a weak, wavering, pitiable and lamentable show" in which not one member of the team "played up to his reputation". The post-match reports agreed that defeat by a Football League side including two current England internationals (Sagar and Plant) was excusable, but the margin of defeat and Southampton's poor standard of performance were not. The Times said that Bury played splendid football to outclass their opponents, but Southampton's "show was the worst seen for many years".

Twelve years later, the correspondent "Recorder" of the Southampton Pictorial claimed that there was an argument before the match between the English and Scottish players at Southampton about who should play as centre-forward. The Scottish players wanted Roddy McLeod but the English, who were a majority, wanted Jack Farrell. The Scottish players had doubts about Farrell's temperament and saw McLeod as a more selfless player. "Recorder" said that the dispute created disharmony in the team and one unnamed player allegedly said later that he gave up on the match because he could see that others were not trying. After the league season ended in May, both players left the club.

Bury made one more appearance in an FA Cup final when they defeated Derby County 6–0 in 1903. Southampton have played in four finals altogether: they lost to Sheffield United in 1902 and to Arsenal in 2003, but they won the cup in 1976 when they defeated Manchester United.

== Bibliography ==
- Bull, David; Brunskell, Bob (2000). Match of the Millennium. Southampton: Hagiology Publishing. ISBN 978-09-53447-41-1.
- Chalk, Gary; Holley, Duncan (1987). Saints – a complete record. Derby: Breedon Books. ISBN 978-09-07969-22-8.
- Collett, Mike (2003). The Complete Record of the FA Cup. Cheltenham: SportsBooks Ltd. ISBN 978-18-99807-19-2.
- Gibbons, Philip (2001). Association Football in Victorian England – A History of the Game from 1863 to 1900. Peterborough: Upfront Publishing. ISBN 978-18-44260-35-5.
- Juson, Dave; Bull, David (2001). Full-Time at The Dell. Southampton: Hagiology Publishing. ISBN 978-09-53447-42-8.
- Lloyd, Guy; Holt, Nick (2005). The FA Cup – the Complete Story. London: Aurum Press. ISBN 978-18-45130-54-1.
