= Henry Bunner =

Henry Bunner may refer to:

- Henry Cuyler Bunner (1855-1896), American novelist, journalist and poet
- Harry Bunner (Henry Francis Bunner 1936-2024), English footballer, see List of Bury F.C. players
