= 1903 FA Cup final =

British association football match

1903 FA Cup Final
- Event: 1902–03 FA Cup
Bury	Derby County
6	0
- Date: 18 April 1903
- Venue: Crystal Palace, London
- Referee: Jack Adams (Birmingham)
- Attendance: 63,102
- Weather: Dry

The 1903 FA Cup final was an association football match between Bury and Derby County on Saturday, 18 April 1903 at the Crystal Palace stadium in south London. It was the final match of the 1902–03 FA Cup, the 32nd edition of the world's oldest football knockout competition, and England's primary cup competition, the Football Association Challenge Cup, better known as the FA Cup.

Bury were appearing in their second final and Derby County in their third – Bury won the cup in 1900 while Derby were runners-up in 1898 and 1899. As members of the Football League First Division, both teams were exempt from the competition's qualifying phase and, having entered in the first round proper, progressed through four rounds to the final.

The final was watched by a crowd of 63,102 and Bury, leading 1–0 at half-time, won a one-sided match 6–0 with goals by Joe Leeming (2), George Ross, Charlie Sagar, Willie Wood and Jack Plant. Bury's six-goal victory remains the record winning margin in FA Cup finals, though it was equalled in the 2019 final when Manchester City defeated Watford by the same score. Bury were the second team to score six in a final, following Blackburn Rovers in the 1890 final; and also the second team to win the cup without conceding a goal in the entire competition, following Preston North End in the 1888–89 tournament.

== 1903 background ==
The FA Cup, known officially as The Football Association Challenge Cup, is an annual knockout association football competition in men's domestic English football. The competition was first proposed on 20 July 1871 by C. W. Alcock at a meeting of The Football Association committee. The tournament was first played in the 1871–72 season and is the world's oldest association football competition. The 1903 match between Bury and Derby County at Crystal Palace was the 32nd final and the third of the 20th century. Bury were appearing in the final for the second time, having defeated Southampton 4–0 in 1900. Derby County were appearing in their third final, having lost the previous two by 3–1 to Nottingham Forest in 1898 and by 4–1 to Sheffield United in 1899.

Bury and Derby County were both members of the Football League First Division. In the 1902–03 league championship, they amassed 35 points each, seven points behind champions The Wednesday. With identical win–loss records, Bury were placed eighth and Derby ninth as Bury had a slightly better goal ratio.

The Derby team was managed by Harry Newbould who in 1900 had become the first person to be formally appointed to the position, having previously had charge of the team as club secretary. Bury's team between 1895 and 1907 was selected by a three-man committee but with club secretary Harry Spencer Hamer in charge of the team on match days.

== Route to the final ==
=== Bury ===
Round	Opposition	Score
First	Wolverhampton Wanderers (h)	1–0
Second	Sheffield United (a)	1–0
Third	Notts County (h)	1–0
Semi-final	Aston Villa (n)	3–0
Key: (h) = home venue; (a) = away venue; (n) = neutral venue. Source:

Bury entered the competition in the first round proper and played four matches en route to the final. All four of their opponents were other teams in the First Division.

==== Early rounds ====
In the first round, Bury were drawn at home against Wolverhampton Wanderers. With a goal after sixty minutes by Billy Richards, Bury won the tie 1–0 at Gigg Lane and progressed to the second round. The crowd was only 5,172.

In the second round, Bury faced a formidable hurdle after they were drawn away to the FA Cup holders and current league title contenders Sheffield United. The tie was decided by a fifth-minute goal scored by Charlie Sagar and Bury won 1–0 at Bramall Lane before a crowd of 24,103.

This victory generated tremendous interest in the town of Bury and, when the team faced Notts County at home in the third round, the crowd was 22,841. Bury again won 1–0, courtesy of a Jimmy Lindsay penalty early in the second half.

==== Semi-final ====
The semi-finals were staged at neutral venues on Saturday, 21 March, and Bury were drawn to play the eventual Division One runners-up Aston Villa at Goodison Park. The crowd was around 50,000 including a sizeable contingent from Bury. Villa were clear favourites to win but it was Bury who dominated the match and they won 3–0 with surprising ease to qualify for their second final in four seasons. The goals at Goodison were scored by Jack Plant after thirty minutes, Sagar (48) and Richards (60). After the semi-final, Bury played four league matches before the final on 18 April and managed to complete these without any of their first-team players sustaining injury.

=== Derby County ===
Round	Opposition	Score
First	Small Heath (h)	2–1
Second	Blackburn Rovers (a)	2–0
Third	Stoke (h)	3–0
Semi-final	Millwall Athletic (n)	3–0
Key: (h) = home venue; (a) = away venue; (n) = neutral venue. Source:

Derby County entered the competition in the first round proper and played four matches en route to the final. Two of their opponents were other teams in the First Division. They also played against one team in the Second Division and one in the Southern League.

==== Early rounds ====
In the first round, Derby were drawn at home against Small Heath, who were successfully chasing promotion from the Second Division. Watched by a crowd of 15,000, Derby won 2–1 at the Baseball Ground with goals by John Boag and Joe Warrington. Small Heath's goal was scored by Jimmy Windridge.

In the second round, Derby were drawn away to relegation-threatened Blackburn Rovers and eased through with a 2–0 win. Their goals were scored by Steve Bloomer and Warrington.

They faced First Division opposition again in the third round and defeated Stoke 3–0 at home before a crowd of 16,000. The goals were scored by George Davis, Warrington and Ben Warren.

==== Semi-final ====
In their semi-final, Derby were drawn against Millwall Athletic, who were then in the Southern League. The match was played at neutral Villa Park and Derby won 3–0 with goals by Boag, Warren and George Richards. The semi-final was played on 21 March and, up to that point, Derby had been in serious contention for the league title. In their next league match on 28 March, they lost to Everton and a slide began with only one more win in their remaining league fixtures.

Derby were hidebound by injuries in this period. Their star forward Steve Bloomer sustained a swollen ankle that kept him out of the final and he was joined on the sidelines by regular halfback Charlie Leckie. Left winger George Davis was temporarily sidelined but was fit for the final. The most significant injury in terms of the final, however, was a groin strain suffered by goalkeeper Jack Fryer when stretching to reach a cross against Middlesbrough at Ayresome Park on Easter Monday, 13 April, just five days before the final.

== Match ==
=== Pre-match ===
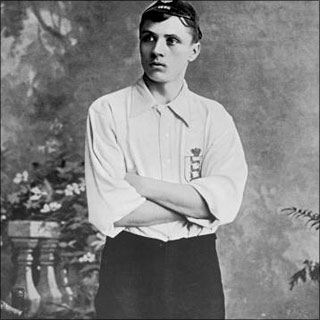
Steve Bloomer missed the final because of injury

As both teams normally wore white shirts and blue shorts, agreement was needed about who should change kit but both clubs claimed priority of choice. The issue was referred to the FA who refused to get involved. Unable to reach agreement, both clubs conceded the argument and neither team wore its normal kit. Bury turned out in Cambridge blue shirts and navy blue shorts, Derby in red shirts and black shorts.

On the Friday afternoon and Saturday morning before the match, seven long special trains left the two Bury stations, Knowsley Street and Bolton Street, for the Crystal Palace. These alone accounted for around 2,000 of a large Bury contingent and thousands travelled from Derby also. An estimated 79 special trains were run to London from various points around England and all the major railway stations in the capital were well-stocked with provisions. At St Pancras, three special rooms were set aside for fans with some 40 barrels of beer, 200 cases of bottled beer, and a plentiful supply of whisky on hand.

Derby arrived at the ground with worries about the fitness of Bloomer and Fryer. Bloomer declared himself unfit but Fryer refused to stand aside for his understudy, Frank Davies, who had never played at senior level. Despite their problems, Derby began the match as favourites given their league form to the end of March, although they were now out of title contention. Bury had no team problems and could field their full first-choice eleven, including six players who had won the cup three years earlier: Joe Leeming, Plant, Richards, George Ross, Sagar and Willie Wood.

The local Bury Times newspaper carried a report which said many photographers were in evidence and a cinematograph was sited on top of one of the stands. The teams came onto the field separately, Derby first, and the Bury newspaper claimed that the roar of the Bury fans "outclassed" that of the Derby fans. The paper commented that, "strangely", the match kicked off at 3:27 pm.

=== First half ===
The weather was dry but the pitch was described as hard and uneven. The pitch seems to have helped Bury take the lead after twenty minutes when their captain George Ross aimed a lofted shot goalwards and the ball bounced awkwardly to deceive Jack Fryer before looping over his head. If Fryer had been fully fit, he would probably have saved the goal.

Bury led by this goal at half-time when, according to the Derby camp, things had gone "better than they had dared hope" – they were a goal down but didn't consider Bury's lead an insurmountable deficit. While Bury had been the better team so far and certainly deserved their lead, it had taken a desperate goal-line clearance by Ross to prevent a Derby goal after goalkeeper Hugh Monteith had been well beaten.

=== Second half ===
Bury began the second half in complete control and Derby's play was so poor that Bury were never fully extended. Monteith had very little to do while, at the other end, it was soon clear that Fryer should not have been playing at all. He aggravated his injury when he tried to prevent Charlie Sagar scoring the second Bury goal three minutes after the interval. The two players had collided and Fryer was forced to leave the field for treatment. With no substitutes allowed, Derby were down to ten men. Left back Charlie Morris deputised for Fryer but, after 56 minutes, Joe Leeming chipped the ball over him as he raced out of his goal and that gave Bury a 3–0 lead.

Fryer returned at this point but, only a minute later, after he had parried a shot by Frank Thorpe, Willie Wood scored the fourth Bury goal. Only two minutes later, it was 5–0 after Jack Plant cut inside from the left and hit a hard shot into the corner of the goal. Bury had scored four goals in an eleven-minute period.

Morris soon had to take over from Fryer again, but no one would have stopped Bury's sixth goal after 75 minutes when Leeming received a pass from Thorpe and sent it crashing into the net. Bury hit the woodwork twice more, and the game descended into near farce when Jimmy Methven went in goal to give Morris a breather. He should have conceded an immediate penalty when he handled the ball before the referee had been told about the change of roles. The Derby history suggests the referee, Jack Adams of Birmingham, must have felt sorry for them because he waved play on.

=== Details ===
18 April 1903
15:27 GMT

Bury	6–0	Derby County
Ross 20'; Sagar 48'; Leeming 56', 75'; Wood 57'; Plant 59'

Crystal Palace, London
Attendance: 63,102
Referee: Jack Adams (Birmingham)
Linesmen: G. W. Simmons & F. Styles

Bury	Derby County

GK	(Scotland) Hugh Monteith
RB	(England) Jimmy Lindsay
LB	(England) James McEwen
RH	(Scotland) John Johnston
CH	(England) Frank Thorpe
LH	(England) George Ross (c)
RW	(England) Billy Richards
IR	(England) Willie Wood
CF	(England) Charlie Sagar
IL	(England) Joe Leeming
LW	(England) Jack Plant
Club secretary:
(England) Harry Spencer Hamer

GK	(England) Jack Fryer
RB	(Scotland) Jimmy Methven
LB	(Wales) Charlie Morris
RH	(England) Ben Warren
CH	(Ireland) Archie Goodall (c)
LH	(Scotland) Johnny May
RW	(England) Joe Warrington
IR	(Scotland) Charlie York
CF	(Scotland) John Boag
IL	(England) George Richards
LW	(England) George Davis
Manager:
(England) Harry Newbould

Match rules

- 90 minutes duration (two halves of 45 minutes each; teams change ends at half-time). (Note: The duration of a football match has been 90 minutes since an agreement in 1866 for the match between London and Sheffield.)
- No extra time if scores level at end of normal time. (Note: The FA introduced the option of extra time into its rules in 1897.) Result to be settled by replay at a later date. (Note: The 1875 final was the first in which a replay took place; this method of deciding the winners continued until 1999. The 2005 final was the first to be settled by penalty shoot-out.)
- No substitutes allowed. (Note: Although there were isolated instances of substitution in earlier times, it was not until the beginning of the 1965–66 season that substitutes were first allowed in English top-class matches, and then only for replacement of injured players.)

Notes

- Players are listed above according to their positions on the field. There was no shirt numbering in 1903. (Note: The first known instance of shirt numbering in English football was in March 1914. It was not until the 1939–40 season that a numbering system was formally introduced.)

== Post-match ==
Afterwards, the trophy was presented to Bury captain George Ross by Lord Kinnaird who was himself a famous footballer, having played in a record nine FA Cup finals from 1873 to 1883. Each of the players was presented with a winner's medal. The club's officials and players spent the weekend celebrating at London's Tavistock Hotel before travelling to Birmingham on the Monday for a league match at The Hawthorns against West Bromwich Albion.

Bury's 6–0 victory created a record for the biggest winning margin in an FA Cup final, beating Blackburn's 6–1 win over The Wednesday in 1890. Manchester City equalled the record when they defeated Watford 6–0 in the 2019 final. Bury equalled Blackburn's record for the most goals scored in a final and also equalled the record first set by Preston North End in 1889 of winning the FA Cup without conceding a goal in any round.

Despite Bury's achievements, the match has been decried as one of the poorest and most one-sided cup finals ever played. The Daily Chronicle reported that the match was a "fiasco" and nothing like it had ever been seen before. The reporter contended that Bury could have scored twenty and did not do so because they "exercised mercy".

The 1903 match was Bury's last final appearance. Derby have reached the final once since 1903, when they defeated Charlton Athletic 4–1 after extra time in 1946.

== Bibliography ==
- Collett, Mike (2003). The Complete Record of the FA Cup. Cheltenham: SportsBooks Ltd. ISBN 978-18-99807-19-2.
