= George Goodchild (footballer) =

English footballer

Personal information
- Date of birth: 1875
- Place of birth: Ryhope, England
- Date of death: 1927 (aged 51–52)
- Position: Winger

Senior career*
Years	Team	Apps	(Gls)
1893–1894	Ryhope Colliery		
1894–1896	Sunderland	1	(0)
1896–1897	Derby County	2	(0)
1897	Nottingham Forest	4	(0)
1897–1899	Burton Swifts	9	(1)
1899–1900	Jarrow		
1900–1901	Whitburn		
1901–1904	South Shields Athletic		
1904–190?	Ashington		
- * Club domestic league appearances and goals

George Goodchild (1875 – 1927) was an English professional footballer who played as a winger for Sunderland.
