= Hugh Monteith =

Scottish footballer

Personal information
- Date of birth: 14 August 1874
- Place of birth: New Cumnock, Scotland
- Date of death: 12 July 1954 (aged 79)
- Place of death: Stirling, Scotland
- Position: Goalkeeper

Youth career
- Wellington Thistle
- Parkhead Juniors

Senior career*
| Years | Team | Apps | (Gls) |
| | Celtic | | (0) |
| 1895–1897 | Loughborough | 58 | (0) |
| 1897–1900 | Bristol City | 70 | (0) |
| 1900–1902 | West Ham United | 53 | (0) |
| 1902–1905 | Bury | 77 | (0) |
| 1905–1907 | Kilmarnock | 10 | (0) |
| 1907–1908 | Beith | | |
- Morton
- Dundee Hibernian
- * Club domestic league appearances and goals

Hugh G. Monteith (14 August 1874 – 12 July 1954) was a Scottish footballer who played as a goalkeeper for various clubs in the 1890s and 1900s, including Bristol City, West Ham United and Bury, with whom he won the FA Cup in 1903.

== Playing career ==
Monteith was born in New Cumnock, Ayrshire and started his football career with Glasgow Junior side Parkhead before signing for Celtic, where he stayed for only one season.

Monteith moved south in 1895 to play for Loughborough Town, making 30 appearances (ever-present) in 1895–96 in the Football League Second Division as Loughborough finished 12th of 16 teams. The following season, 1896–97, he made 28 appearances as Loughborough finished 13th. He was sold in the summer of 1897 when the club needed to reduce their overdraft liabilities.

Sam Hollis signed Monteith for Bristol City in their first professional season playing in the Southern League, along with Billy Jones and Jack Hamilton. He made his debut in goal in a 7–4 win v Wolverton & LNWR on 11 September 1897. Monteith was ever present with 22 appearances as Bristol City were runners-up in the Southern League in 1897–98. He went on to make a further 23 appearances as the club again finished runners-up in 1898–99, then 30 appearances in 1899–1900.

Signed by Arnold Hills, Monteith then moved to West Ham United at the start of the Edwardian era and the beginning of West Ham as a football club. He played 60 games in all competitions for West Ham. The team conceded just 28 goals in their first season; seven during Monteith's five-game absence during the season.

In 1902 he joined Bury, winning the 1903 FA Cup final where Bury defeated Derby County in one of the most one-sided finals ever played; the 6–0 victory still stands as the record win. Bury and Monteith also equalled another record, winning the cup without conceding a goal in any round.

== Honours ==
Bury

- FA Cup: 1903
