= 1905–06 Dundee F.C. season =

Dundee
1905–06 season
- Manager: William Wallace
- Stadium: Dens Park
- Division One: 7th
- Scottish Cup: First round
- Top goalscorer: League: Jasper McLuckie (10); All: Jasper McLuckie (10)
Home colours

The 1905–06 season was the thirteenth season in which Dundee competed at a Scottish national level, playing in Division One, where they would finish in 7th place. Dundee would also compete in the Scottish Cup, where they would lose to Celtic in the first round.

== Scottish Division One ==
Statistics provided by Dee Archive

Match day	Date	Opponent	H/A	Score	Dundee scorer(s)	Attendance
1	19 August	St Mirren	H	1–2	Fraser	9,500
2	26 August	Hibernian	A	1–2	Bell	5,000
3	2 September	Greenock Morton	H	3–1	Dainty, McLuckie, MacFarlane	6,300
4	9 September	Partick Thistle	H	1–1	McLuckie	6,000
5	16 September	Motherwell	A	1–4	Webb	
6	23 September	Queen's Park	H	1–0	Dainty	7,280
7	30 September	Port Glasgow Athletic	A	1–1	Bell	3,800
8	7 October	Kilmarnock	H	2–1	McDiarmid, Webb	4,800
9	14 October	Rangers	A	1–1	MacFarlane	9,500
10	21 October	Heart of Midlothian	H	1–1	Nimmo	14,000
11	28 October	Celtic	A	1–3	Webb	6,000
12	4 November	Third Lanark	H	2–0	McLuckie, Fraser	8,000
13	11 November	Falkirk	A	0–2		
14	18 November	Aberdeen	H	6–0	MacFarlane (2), McLuckie (3), Henderson	13,000
15	25 November	Airdrieonians	H	2–1	MacFarlane, Dainty	
16	2 December	St Mirren	A	1–1	MacFarlane	
17	9 December	Falkirk	H	3–0	MacFarlane, Webb (2)	8,300
18	16 December	Kilmarnock	H	2–2	Fraser (2)	
19	23 December	Hibernian	H	1–1	MacFarlane	8,600
20	25 December	Third Lanark	A	2–0	Webb, McLuckie	2,500
21	30 December	Port Glasgow Athletic	H	1–1	Webb	5,800
22	6 January	Aberdeen	A	2–1	Dainty, Bell	10,000
23	13 January	Heart of Midlothian	A	0–4		8,000
24	20 January	Motherwell	H	2–0	Dainty, McLuckie	
25	3 February	Celtic	H	1–0	McLuckie	10,800
26	17 February	Rangers	H	1–1	McLuckie	10,000
27	24 February	Greenock Morton	A	0–0		
28	3 March	Partick Thistle	A	0–1		
29	10 March	Airdrieonians	H	0–0		5,000
30	31 March	Queen's Park	A	0–0		

=== League table ===
Pos	Team	Pld	W	D	L	GF	GA	GD	Pts
5	Partick Thistle	30	15	6	9	44	40	+4	36
6	Third Lanark	30	16	2	12	62	38	+24	34
7	Dundee	30	11	12	7	40	33	+7	34
8	St Mirren	30	13	5	12	41	37	+4	31
9	Morton	30	10	6	14	35	54	−19	26

Source: "1905-1906 Division 1 - SPFL Archive". SPFL.

== Scottish Cup ==
Statistics provided by Dee Archive

Match day	Date	Opponent	H/A	Score	Dundee scorer(s)	Attendance
1st round	27 January	Celtic	H	1–2	Fraser	26,000

== Player statistics ==
Statistics provided by Dee Archive

No.	Pos	Nat	Player	Total		First Division		Scottish Cup	
No.	Pos	Nat	Player	Apps	Goals	Apps	Goals	Apps	Goals
	FW	(Scotland) SCO	Alan Bell	22	3	22	3	0	0
	DF	(Scotland) SCO	Dickie Boyle	5	0	5	0	0	0
	FW	(Scotland) SCO	Dave Cowie	10	0	10	0	0	0
	DF	(England) ENG	Bert Dainty	31	5	30	5	1	0
	DF	(Scotland) SCO	Johnny Darroch	8	0	8	0	0	0
	FW	(Scotland) SCO	Jack Fraser	29	5	28	4	1	1
	MF	(Scotland) SCO	William Henderson	26	1	25	1	1	0
	MF	(Scotland) SCO	Jimmy Jeffray	27	0	26	0	1	0
	DF	(Scotland) SCO	James Lyon	1	0	1	0	0	0
	FW	(Scotland) SCO	Sandy MacFarlane	25	8	24	8	1	0
	DF	(Scotland) SCO	Tom McAteer	4	0	4	0	0	0
	FW	(Scotland) SCO	Fred McDiarmid	30	1	29	1	1	0
	DF	(Scotland) SCO	John McKenzie	25	0	24	0	1	0
	FW	(Scotland) SCO	Jasper McLuckie	29	10	28	10	1	0
	FW	(Scotland) SCO	Alex Mitchell	5	0	5	0	0	0
	GK	(Scotland) SCO	Willie Muir	31	0	30	0	1	0
	FW	(Scotland) SCO	Allan Nimmo	4	1	4	1	0	0
	FW	(England) ENG	Charlie Webb	28	7	27	7	1	0

== See also ==
- List of Dundee F.C. seasons
