= Cliff Leeming =

English footballer (1920–2014)

Personal information
- Full name: Clifford Leeming
- Date of birth: 2 February 1920
- Place of birth: Edgworth, England
- Date of death: 31 January 2014 (aged 93)
- Place of death: Bolton, England
- Position: Inside forward

Youth career
- Bolton Wanderers

Senior career*
Years	Team	Apps	(Gls)
1946–1947	Bury	1	(0)
1947–1948	Tranmere Rovers	13	(2)
Total		14	(2)
- * Club domestic league appearances and goals

Cliff Leeming (2 February 1920 – 31 January 2014) was an English footballer, who played as an inside forward in the Football League for Tranmere Rovers. He was the son of Joe Leeming, a player for Bury.

Leeming died on 31 January 2014.
