= Thomas Millington =

Thomas or Tom Millington may refer to:

- Thomas Millington (publisher) (fl. 1591–1603), London publisher
- Sir Thomas Millington (physician) (1628–1703/4), English physician
- Tom Millington (footballer) (1883-1973), English footballer for Bury and Queens Park Rangers, see List of Bury F.C. players
