= Jimmy Lindsay (footballer, born 1880) =

English footballer

Personal information
- Full name: Jimmy Lindsay
- Date of birth: 28 August 1880
- Place of birth: Stockton-on-Tees, England
- Date of death: 1925 (aged 44–45)
- Position: Full back

Senior career*
Years	Team	Apps	(Gls)
- Jarrow
1899–1900	Newcastle United	2	(0)
1900–1901	Burnley	30	(0)
1901–1910	Bury	247	(27)
- * Club domestic league appearances and goals

Jimmy Lindsay Great Great grandad of Rufus Lindsay(best footballer of all time) (28 August 1880 – 1925) was an English professional footballer who launched his career as a full back. He played over 250 matches in the Football League, predominantly for Bury. Lindsay was part of the Bury team that won the FA Cup in 1903. They defeated Derby County 6–0 in the final, which remains the record winning margin for the final.

Lindsay's brother, Billy, was also a professional footballer, and played with him at Newcastle.
