= Harry Spencer Hamer =

Secretary of Bury Football Club

Personal information
- Date of birth: 1863
- Place of birth: Rochdale
- Date of death: 21 December 1913 (aged 49–50)
- Place of death: Bury, Greater Manchester

Senior career*
Years	Team	Apps	(Gls)
1885–1913	Bury		
- * Club domestic league appearances and goals

Harry Spencer Hamer (1863 — 21 December 1913) was the club secretary at Bury Football Club from 1888 until his death from pleurisy in 1913. From 1895 to 1907, the Bury team was managed by a three-man committee which may have included Hamer. The team were in the First Division throughout this period, their best position being fifth; and they won the FA Cup twice, in 1900 and 1903, with final victories of 4–0 and 6–0 respectively.

Although he was never formally appointed team manager, Hamer is believed to have had responsibility for the Bury team in both cup finals. His portrait is shown alongside that of Derby County manager Harry Newbould in the Athletic News 1903 FA Cup Final report which illustrates the two cup final teams and their club-officials.

According to a Sheffield newspaper, Hamer was the team manager from 1888 to 1913 but that information is flatly contradicted by the Bury club's own website which confirms that other club officials managed the team until 1895 and that the three-man committee operated from then until 1907 when Archie Montgomery, who had been the team's goalkeeper hitherto, was appointed as the first specialist manager. Hamer was probably the former Bury player who is credited with goals scored in two matches played in October 1885.
