= Charlie York =

Scottish footballer

Personal information
- Full name: Charles Henry York
- Date of birth: 27 March 1883
- Place of birth: Edinburgh, Scotland
- Date of death: 1955
- Place of death: Aldershot, England
- Height: 5 ft 9 in (1.75 m)
- Position: Forward

Senior career*
Years	Team	Apps	(Gls)
1900–1901	Swindon Town		
1901–1902	Reading		
1902–1903	Derby County	24	(6)
1903–1904	Sunderland	2	(0)
1904	Heart of Midlothian		
1904–1905	Southampton	3	(0)
1905–1906	Sheppey United		
1906–190?	South Farnborough Athletic		
- * Club domestic league appearances and goals

Charles Henry York (27 March 1883 – 1955) was a Scottish professional footballer who played as a forward for various clubs in Scotland and England, including Derby County, with whom he was on the losing side in the 1903 FA Cup Final, Sunderland and Southampton.
