= George Richards (footballer, born 1880) =

English footballer

Personal information
- Full name: George Henry Richards
- Date of birth: 10 May 1880
- Place of birth: Castle Donington, Leicestershire, England
- Date of death: 1 November 1959 (aged 79)
- Position: Wing half

Senior career*
Years	Team	Apps	(Gls)
- Castle Donington Juniors
- Whitwick White Cross
1901–1914	Derby County	284	(33)

International career
1909	England	1	(0)
- * Club domestic league appearances and goals

George Richards (10 May 1880 – 1 November 1959) was an English footballer who played as a wing half (and sometimes inside left) in the Football League with Derby County in the 1900s and 1910s. His final game for Derby came on 7 February 1914.

He was born in Castle Donington, Leicestershire and played for local teams before signing for First Division side Derby County in the 1901-02 season. He went on to make 284 Football League appearances for Derby, scoring 33 times. He was a member of the Derby team that were runners-up in the 1903 FA Cup Final.

On 1 June 1909, Richards made his only appearance for England against Austria, having been a reserve for the match against Scotland earlier that year. He also toured with the FA party in South Africa in 1910.

== Honours ==
Derby County

- Football League Second Division champions: 1911–12
- FA Cup finalists: 1903
