= Billy Richardson (footballer, born 1896) =

English footballer

Personal information
- Full name: William Richardson
- Date of birth: 3 June 1896
- Place of birth: Scotswood, England
- Date of death: 1959 (aged 62–63)
- Position: Goalkeeper

Senior career*
| Years | Team | Apps | (Gls) |
| 1919–1920 | Scotswood | | |
| 1920–1922 | Blackpool | 32 | (0) |
| 1922–1929 | Bury | 216 | (0) |
| 1929–1931 | Stockport County | 41 | (0) |
| 1932 | Rossendale United | | |
| Total | | 289 | (0) |
- * Club domestic league appearances and goals

William Richardson (3 June 1896 – 1959) was an English footballer who played in the Football League for Blackpool, Bury and Stockport County.
