= Billy Harrison (footballer, born 1901) =

English footballer

Personal information
- Full name: William Harrison
- Date of birth: 26 September 1901
- Place of birth: Lancaster, Lancashire, England
- Date of death: 1984 (aged 82–83)
- Position: Goalkeeper

Senior career*
Years	Team	Apps	(Gls)
1921–1922	Scotforth		
1922–1923	Marsh Wesleyans		
1923–1924	Lancaster Town		
1924–1933	Bury	127	(0)
1933–193?	Lancaster Town		
- * Club domestic league appearances and goals

William Harrison (26 September 1901 – 1984) was an English professional footballer who played as a goalkeeper in the English Football League for Bury, and also played non-league football for Scotforth, Marsh Wesleyans and Lancaster Town.
