= Jimmy McIlwraith =

Scottish footballer (1954–

Personal information
- Full name: James McLean McIlwraith
- Date of birth: 17 April 1954 (age 72)
- Place of birth: Troon, Scotland
- Height: 5 ft 8 in (1.73 m)
- Position: Midfielder

Senior career*
Years	Team	Apps	(Gls)
–1973	Kilwinning Rangers		
1973–1975	Motherwell	28	(6)
1975–1978	Bury	89	(21)
1978–1979	Portsmouth	19	(0)
1978–1979	→ Ayr United (loan)	2	(0)
1979–1980	Bury	29	(3)
1980–1982	Halifax Town	36	(6)
1982–1985	Highlands Park		
1989-1990	Castleton Gabriels		
1989-1990	Radcliffe Borough	17	(6)
1990-1991	Droylsden		
Total		203	(36)
- * Club domestic league appearances and goals

James McLean McIlwraith (born 17 April 1954 in Troon, Scotland) is a retired professional footballer who played as a midfielder for Kilwinning Rangers, Motherwell, Bury, Portsmouth, Ayr United, Halifax Town, Highlands Park, Castleton Gabriels, Radcliffe Borough and Droylsden.

== Career ==
McIlwraith started his career at Kilwinning Rangers, for whom he scored over 60 goals. He signed for Motherwell in 1973 following a trial spell with the club.

McIlwraith made 33 appearances for Motherwell from 1973 to 1975 and scored seven goals. He signed for Bury in the summer of 1975 and played in 118 matches for them, scoring 24 goals. He had two spells at Gigg Lane from September 1975 to July 1978, and from July 1979 to October 1980. In the 1978–79 season, he played for Portsmouth, making 19 appearances. He also had a month-long loan spell at Ayr United in the 1978–79 season. In October 1980, he moved to Halifax Town and made 36 appearances with six goals. He left Halifax after the 1981–82 season, and had a three-year spell in South Africa with Highlands Park, plus time at Castleton Gabriels, Radcliffe Borough and Droylsden.
