= Billy Richards (footballer, born 1878) =

English footballer

Personal information
- Full name: William Richards
- Date of birth: 11 March 1878
- Place of birth: Heaton Park, England
- Date of death: 1947 (aged 68–69)
- Position: Winger

Senior career*
| Years | Team | Apps | (Gls) |
| 1896–1897 | Tonge | | |
| 1897–1898 | Middleton | | |
| 1898–1908 | Bury | 233 | (24) |
| 1908 | Heywood United | | |
| Total | | 233 | (24) |
- * Club domestic league appearances and goals

William Richards (11 March 1878 – 1947) was an English footballer who played in the Football League for Bury. Richards played in both the 1900 and 1903 FA Cup Finals.
