= Jimmy Porter (football manager) =

Scottish footballer and manager

Personal information
- Full name: W. James Porter
- Date of birth: 31 July 1901
- Place of birth: Hamilton, Scotland
- Date of death: 1967 (aged 65–66)
- Height: 5 ft 11 in (1.80 m)
- Position: Right-half

Senior career*
Years	Team	Apps	(Gls)
- Wishaw YMCA
1921–1935	Bury	396	(7)

Managerial career
- 1944–1945: Bury
- 1949–1951: Accrington Stanley
- * Club domestic league appearances and goals

W. James Porter (31 July 1901 – 1967) was a Scottish football player and manager who played as a right-half.

Born in Hamilton, Lanarkshire, he began his career with nearby Wishaw YMCA before moving to England to join Bury in 1921. He played for Bury for 15 seasons, making 396 league appearances and scoring seven goals (421 appearances, 8 goals in all competitions).

In November 1937, he was hired by Manchester United to serve as one of the club's scouting network. By that December, his responsibilities had extended to coaching (the League Managers Association website lists him as the club's manager for most of the Second World War period, but it is generally considered that he was assistant to Walter Crickmer, and there is no mention of him in club records beyond the end of the 1938–39 season).

Porter took over as manager of Bury in March 1944, but stepped down in June 1945 to become the assistant to his successor, Norman Bullock. In 1949, he was appointed as manager of Accrington Stanley, a position he held until March 1951.

== Managerial statistics ==
Team	Nat	From	To	Record				
Team	Nat	From	To	G	W	D	L	Win %
Bury	(England)	14 March 1944	14 June 1945					
Accrington Stanley	(England)	June 1949	March 1951					

== See also ==
- List of one-club men in association football
