= Jack Ball (footballer, born 1900) =

English footballer

Personal information
- Full name: John Ball
- Date of birth: 29 September 1900
- Place of birth: Stockport, England
- Date of death: December 1989 (aged 89)
- Place of death: Coventry, England
- Height: 5 ft 9 in (1.75 m)
- Position: Inside left

Senior career*
Years	Team	Apps	(Gls)
- Silverwood Colliery
1919–1921	Sheffield United		
1921–1922	Bristol Rovers		
1922–1923	Wath Athletic		
1923–1929	Bury		
1929–1930	West Ham United	15	(9)
1930–1931	Coventry City		
- Stourbridge
- Hinckley United
- Atherstone Town
- Coventry Gas

International career
1927	England	1	(0)
- * Club domestic league appearances and goals

John Ball (29 September 1900 – December 1989) was an English international footballer who played as an inside left.

== Early life ==
Ball was born in Stockport with nine older siblings; his father was Welsh and a railway labourer.

== Career ==
Ball played for Silverwood Colliery, Sheffield United, Bristol Rovers, Wath Athletic, Bury, West Ham United, Coventry City, Stourbridge, Hinckley United, Atherstone Town, and Coventry Gas. In the Football League he scored 108 goals in 269 appearances. With West Ham he scored 9 goals in 15 league games.

He earned one cap for England, in 1927.

== later life ==
By 1939 he was married and working as an aero department inspector. He died in Coventry in December 1989, aged 89.
