= Jimmy Kerr (footballer, born 1949) =

Scottish footballer

Personal information
- Full name: James Peter Kerr
- Date of birth: 2 September 1949 (age 77)
- Place of birth: Glasgow, Scotland
- Position: Midfielder

Senior career*
| Years | Team | Apps | (Gls) |
| 1965–1970 | Bury | 152 | (38) |
| 1970–1971 | Blackburn Rovers | 11 | (0) |
| 1971 | Highlands Park | | |
| 1972 | Coventry City | 0 | (0) |
- * Club domestic league appearances and goals

James Peter Kerr (born 2 September 1949) is a Scottish former footballer who played for Blackburn Rovers and Bury.
