= Hugh Tinney (footballer) =

Scottish footballer

Personal information
- Full name: Hugh Joseph Tinney
- Date of birth: 14 May 1944 (age 82)
- Place of birth: Glasgow, Scotland
- Position: Right back

Youth career
- Bathgate St Mary's
- ?-1961: Bathgate Thistle

Senior career*
Years	Team	Apps	(Gls)
1961–1966	Partick Thistle	64	(0)
1966–1973	Bury	238	(3)
1973–1974	Fleetwood F.C.	26	(0)
1974	Balgownie Rangers		

International career
1966–1967	Scotland U23	2	(0)
1967	Scotland	2	(0)
- * Club domestic league appearances and goals

Hugh Joseph Tinney (born 14 May 1944, in Glasgow) is a Scottish former footballer.

Tinney played for Partick Thistle in Scotland before moving to England where he played for Bury. Tinney played six seasons at Bury before moving to Northern Premier League club Fleetwood in 1973. Tinney later moved to Australia to play for Balgownie Rangers.

Tinney made two appearances for the Scotland national team during a 1967 overseas tour that the Scottish Football Association decided in October 2021 to reclassify as full internationals.
