= Jack Pray =

Scottish footballer

Personal information
- Full name: John Pray
- Date of birth: 17 March 1872
- Place of birth: Falkirk, Scotland
- Date of death: 1948 (aged 75–76)
- Place of death: Canada
- Position: Half back

Senior career*
Years	Team	Apps	(Gls)
1889–1890	Falkirk Excelsior		
1890–1894	Falkirk		
1894–1895	Rangers	3	(0)
1895–1901	Bury	185	(8)
1903–1904	St Bernard's	5	(0)
- * Club domestic league appearances and goals

John Pray (17 March 1872 – 1948) was a footballer who played in the English Football League for Bury. He spent his early career with hometown club Falkirk and had short spells at Scottish Football League clubs Rangers and St Bernard's either side of his six seasons in England with Bury, during which he won the FA Cup in 1900.
