= Les Hart =

English footballer and manager

Personal information
- Full name: John Leslie Hart
- Date of birth: 28 February 1917
- Place of birth: Ashton-in-Makerfield, England
- Date of death: 20 August 1996 (aged 79)
- Place of death: Bury, England
- Position: Right-back

Senior career*
| Years | Team | Apps | (Gls) |
| 1936–1953 | Bury | 280 | (2) |
| Total | | 280 | (2) |
- * Club domestic league appearances and goals

John Leslie Hart (28 February 1917 – 20 August 1996) was a professional footballer who had an association with one club, Bury for 44 years. This involved work as "player, manager, coach and physio".

== Early career ==
Hart was born in Ashton-in-Makerfield and started his footballing career at Earlstown White Star. He was quickly scouted and a number of clubs were after his signature including Liverpool but he signed for Bury, starting a career which would last until 1980 in various roles.

He took over the right-back position from Irish International Bill Gorman. He made his debut against Tottenham Hotspur on 17 December 1936. Hart would become Bury's Captain for 12 seasons and in 1948/49 season he skippered a side that found themselves four points clear as leaders of Division 2.

His career spanned the era of footballing greats including Tom Finney, Sir Stanley Matthews, Bill Shankly, Bob Paisley and Frank Swift. He completed his football coaches badges and physiotherapy qualifications over a period at Lillishall in preparation for his retirement from playing which came after the 1953/54 season. Although his career shows 265 appearances for Bury, he also made over 200 appearances during the war years of 1939–45. After quitting from playing, he worked at Bury as first team trainer/coach, and became the club's physiotherapist. Leeds United offered him a position as head coach but he turned it down to stay at Bury.

In season 1969/70 he was asked to take up the position of manager and he steered the club to a record 8–0 win against Tranmere Rovers. In 1971, he reverted to his job as physiotherapist. Les retired on 29 March 1980 after 44 years at one club, Les decided the time was right to look after his wife May, who had suffered from ill health for some time.

== Recognition ==
The South Stand at Bury's ground, Gigg Lane, is named The Les Hart Stand in his honour.
