= Johnny Darroch =

Scottish footballer

Personal information
- Full name: John Darroch
- Date of birth: 28 January 1871
- Place of birth: Bonhill, Scotland
- Date of death: 24 November 1949 (aged 78)
- Place of death: Dundee, Scotland
- Height: 5 ft 7 1/2 in (1.71 m)
- Position: Full back

Senior career*
Years	Team	Apps	(Gls)
- Dumbarton
–1890	Renton		
1890–1892	Vale of Leven	7	(0)
1892–1893	The Wednesday	16	(0)
1894–1896	Dundee	36	(0)
1896–1901	Bury	143	(1)
1901–1902	Blackburn Rovers	17	(0)
1902–1910	Dundee	39	(0)
1910–1911	Dundee Hibernian	0	(0)
- * Club domestic league appearances and goals

John Darroch (28 January 1871 – 24 November 1949), sometimes known as Johnny Darroch, Joe Darroch or Jack Darroch, was a Scottish professional footballer who played as a full back for a number of clubs in the Football League and Scottish League.

== Career ==
A full back, Darroch played in the Football League for The Wednesday, Bury and Blackburn Rovers and was a part of Bury's 1899–1900 FA Cup-winning team. He also played in the Scottish League for Dundee and Vale of Leven. Darroch joined Dundee Hibernian at the beginning of the 1910–11 season, but made no competitive appearances and was released in April 1911. During the First World War he played for Dainty's XI, a charity team organised by his former Dundee teammate Herbert Dainty.

== Personal life ==
Between the end of his football career and his death in 1949, Darroch emigrated to the United States. At the time of his death in November 1949, he was living in Dundee.

== Career statistics ==
Appearances and goals by club, season and competition
Club	Season	League			National Cup		Total	
Club	Season	Division	Apps	Goals	Apps	Goals	Apps	Goals
Vale of Leven	1890–91	Scottish League	2	0	0	0	2	0
Vale of Leven	1891–92	Scottish League	5	0	0	0	5	0
Vale of Leven	Total		7	0	0	0	7	0
The Wednesday	1892–93	First Division	12	0	2	0	14	0
The Wednesday	1893–94	First Division	4	0	0	0	4	0
The Wednesday	Total		16	0	2	0	18	0
Dundee	1894–95	Scottish Division One	18	0	6	0	24	0
Dundee	1895–96	Scottish Division One	18	0	2	0	20	0
Dundee	Total		36	0	8	0	44	0
Blackburn Rovers	1901–02	First Division	17	0	1	0	18	0
Dundee	1902–03	Scottish Division One	22	0	6	0	28	0
Dundee	1903–04	Scottish Division One	8	0	2	0	10	0
Dundee	1904–05	Scottish Division One	1	0	0	0	1	0
Dundee	1905–06	Scottish Division One	8	0	0	0	8	0
Dundee	Total		75	0	16	0	91	0
Career total			115	0	19	0	134	0

== Honours ==
Bury

- FA Cup: 1899–1900
