= Charlie Sagar =

English footballer

Personal information
- Date of birth: 28 March 1878
- Place of birth: Daisy Hill, Edgworth, England
- Date of death: 4 December 1919 (aged 41)
- Place of death: Bolton, England
- Height: 5 ft 11 1/2 in (1.82 m)
- Position: Forward

Youth career
- 1893–1894: Edgworth Rovers
- 1894–1896: Turton St. Anne's
- 1896–1898: Turton Rovers

Senior career*
Years	Team	Apps	(Gls)
1898–1905	Bury	186	(71)
1905–1907	Manchester United	30	(20)
1907–1909	Atherton		
1909–?	Haslingden		
Total		216	(91)

International career
1900–1902	England	2	(1)
	The Football League XI	4	
- * Club domestic league appearances and goals

Charles Sagar (28 March 1878 – 4 December 1919) was an English footballer. Born in Edgworth, Lancashire, he played in The Football League for Bury and Manchester United at the turn of the 20th century. He also played twice for the England national team.

== Career ==
Born in Daisy Hill, Edgworth, Lancashire, Sagar was raised in Turton. He began his football career with Edgworth Rovers, making his debut for the club's reserve team at the age of 15, before a season with Turton St. Anne's in the Bolton Sunday School League led to him signing for Lancashire Combination side Turton Rovers in 1896 at the age of 18. After a two-goal performance for Turton Rovers against Bury Reserves, the Gigg Lane club signed Sagar in 1898. In a seven-year spell with Bury, Sagar scored 71 goals in 186 appearances, and finished as the club's top scorer from 1903 to 1905. He was also part of the Bury team that won the FA Cup in 1900 and 1903, scoring the second of six goals in the latter game – Bury's 6–0 win is still a record margin of victory in the FA Cup Final. During his time at Bury, Sagar played for The Football League XI four times.

Bury finished in 17th in the First Division in 1904–05, which would have seen them relegated had the league not chosen to expand the division from 18 teams to 20. Nevertheless, Sagar joined Manchester United in May 1905, and made his debut on the opening day of the 1905–06 season at home to Bristol City; Manchester United won 5–1, with Sagar scoring a hat-trick – only Wayne Rooney has since scored a hat-trick on his Manchester United debut. He scored another hat-trick in another 5–1 win against Barnsley later in the season on the way to a total of 20 goals in 23 appearances; only a knee injury prevented him from contributing further to the club's second-place finish in the Second Division and subsequent promotion. The injury worsened over the course of the following season, limiting Sagar to sporadic appearances and his eventual release at the end of the season; he managed only four goals in 10 appearances in 1906–07.

After leaving Manchester United, Sagar joined Atherton of the Lancashire Combination First Division, but left for Second Division Haslingden after Atherton finished bottom of the league in 1909. The year after Sagar joined Haslingden, they scored 113 league goals, but it is unknown how many of these he contributed. They scored 98 goals the following year on the way to securing the Division Two title and promotion to Division One.

Sagar earned two caps for England. He made his debut on 17 March 1900 against Ireland in the 1899–1900 British Home Championship, and scored the second goal in a 2–0 win. His only other appearance came against Wales two years later.

After retiring from football, Sagar set up a business in Bolton.

== Honours ==
Bury

- FA Cup: 1899–1900, 1902–03
