= Jarrow F.C. (1894) =

Defunct association football club in England

- Full name: Jarrow Football Club
- Nickname: the Tynesiders
- Founded: 1894
- Dissolved: 1902
- Ground: Monkton
Home colours

Jarrow Football Club was an association football club based in Jarrow, Tyne and Wear, England.

== History ==
The club was formed in 1894 after Jarrow Rangers folded. Having initially been accepted into the Tyneside League, the new club successfully applied to join the Northern Alliance for the 1894–95 season. Its first match on 22 August was a friendly against Bill Quay Albion, with Jarrow winning 3–0.

The club was Northern Alliance runner-up in 1897–98 and won the league the following season, also reaching the first round of the FA Cup; drawn away to First Division club Everton, despite the difference between the sides being considered as great as that "between a blood racer and a grocer's pony", Jarrow only lost 3–1, put down in part to Everton playing at half-speed. In 1899–1900 it reached the first round again, and was drawn at home to Millwall Athletic, which offered (in vain) £150 to switch the venue to London. However the match was anti-climactic, as the Dockers took the lead from a corner after just three minutes, and a second goal before half-time effectively settled the tie for the visitors, the Jarrow consolation being the crowd, given as 8,000.

The 1899–1900 season also saw the club gain its greatest success, winning the Durham Challenge Cup, with a 1–0 win over Sunderland 'A' in the final at South Shields; a first-half goal from Lindsley, whose shot was too hot for Naisby to handle, was enough to secure the Cup for the Tynesiders for the only time.

A slump in shipbuilding persuaded the club to turn fully amateur in 1901, but the resulting exodus of professional players proved disastrous for the club, as it dropped to one off the bottom of the Alliance in 1901–02. Although the club was re-elected to the competition in June 1902, it disbanded the following month, many of its players joining Hebburn Argyle, which had avoided a similar fate by the skin of its teeth. Its final match had been a 3–2 home win over Thornaby, in "boisterous" weather, on 26 April. A new Jarrow A.F.C. was formed a year later.

== Colours ==
The club's original colours were white and black. In 1900 they changed to white with blue "pants", although the shirts were so old as to be described as "what were once white".

== Ground ==
The club's ground was the Monkton cycling track. The club formed a limited liability company (the Jarrow Cycling, Athletic, and Football Ground Company Limited) to buy its leasehold hold in 1897.

== Notable players ==
- Notable players ( 7 )
- Jack Lyall, goalkeeper and future Scotland international, who was transferred from the club (along with full-back William Gosling ) to Sheffield Wednesday in February 1901.
