= George Ross (footballer, born 1869) =

English footballer

Personal information
- Full name: George William Ross
- Date of birth: 29 November 1869
- Place of birth: Melbairn
- Date of death: 1928 (aged 58–59)
- Position: Wing half

Senior career*
Years	Team	Apps	(Gls)
- Bury Unitarians
1894–1906	Bury	366	(10)
- * Club domestic league appearances and goals

George Ross (29 November 1869 - 1929) was a footballer who played in England in the 1890s and 1900s.

He played for Bury and won two FA Cup finals with them. In 1900 he was a member of the Bury team that defeated Southampton 4–0. In 1903 he was the Bury captain and made a significant contribution to their victory, scoring the first goal in their record 6–0 win over Derby County. He was also in the Bury team that won the 1899 Lancashire Senior Cup.
