= Jack Fryer (footballer, born 1877) =

English footballer

Personal information
- Full name: John Spencer Fryer
- Date of birth: 1877
- Place of birth: Cromford, England
- Date of death: 1933 (aged 55–56)
- Position: Goalkeeper

Senior career*
Years	Team	Apps	(Gls)
	Abbey Rovers	?	(?)
	Cromford	?	(?)
?–1897	Clay Cross Town	?	(?)
1897–1903	Derby County	173	(0)
1903–1910	Fulham	142	(0)
Total		315	(0)
- * Club domestic league appearances and goals

John Spencer Fryer (1877–1933) was an English footballer who played for Derby County and Fulham in the Football League. He played in each of Derby's first three FA Cup Final appearances. He was reputedly one of the heaviest players to have taken to a football pitch.
