= Jasper McLuckie =

Scottish footballer

Personal information
- Full name: Jasper McLuckie
- Date of birth: 1 January 1878
- Place of birth: Glasgow, Scotland
- Date of death: 1924 (aged 46)
- Position: Centre-forward

Senior career*
Years	Team	Apps	(Gls)
–	Jordanhill		
1898–1901	Bury	94	(31)
1901–1904	Aston Villa	57	(41)
1904–1905	Plymouth Argyle	33	(14)
1905–1906	Dundee	28	(10)
- * Club domestic league appearances and goals

Jasper McLuckie (1 January 1878 – 1924) was a Scottish footballer who played as a centre-forward. He played in the Football League for Bury and Aston Villa, the Southern League for Plymouth Argyle, and the Scottish Division One for Dundee. McLuckie scored two goals for Bury in the 1900 FA Cup Final.

== Career ==
McLuckie was born in Glasgow in 1878. He played in his hometown for Junior side Jordanhill before joining Football League First Division club Bury in 1898. In three years with the club, he scored 31 league goals in 94 appearances. McLuckie scored two goals in the 1900 FA Cup Final as Bury defeated Southampton 4–0 at Crystal Palace. In 1901, he moved to fellow First Division side Aston Villa. In his second season with the club, they missed out on winning the Football League title by one point. McLuckie spent three seasons with Aston Villa and scored 46 goals in 62 appearances, which included five goals in five FA Cup matches. He joined Southern League First Division club Plymouth Argyle in 1904 and was "a consistent performer" in his one season with the club. McLuckie made 37 appearances in all competitions and scored 16 goals before returning to Scotland in 1905 to finish his career with Dundee in his final season, in which he would finish as the club's top scorer.

== Honours ==
- FA Cup: 1900
