= Jack Plant =

English footballer

Personal information
- Full name: John Plant
- Date of birth: 23 March 1871
- Place of birth: Bollington, England
- Date of death: 19 January 1950 (aged 78)
- Place of death: Crewe, England
- Height: 5 ft 8 in (1.73 m)
- Position: Outside left

Youth career
- Denton
- Bollington

Senior career*
Years	Team	Apps	(Gls)
1890–1898	Bury		
1898–1899	Reading		
1899–1907	Bury		

International career
1900	England	1	(0)
- * Club domestic league appearances and goals

John Plant (23 March 1871 – 19 January 1950) was an English international footballer, who played as an outside left.

== Early and personal life ==
Plant was born in Bollington, Cheshire on 23 March 1871. He was the eldest of four children. He worked as a labourer in an iron foundry. He married and had two daughters.

== Career ==
Plant spent his early career playing with local clubs Denton and Bollington. He signed for Bury in 1890, and won the Football League Division Two title with Bury in 1894–95. He spent the 1898–99 season with Reading, before returning to Bury, where he finished his career in 1907. He was a member of Bury's FA Cup-winning teams in 1900 and 1903, scoring a goal in both finals.

He earned one cap for England in 1900.

== Later life and death ==
By 1911 he was working as a labourer in a cotton mill. By 1939 he was a retired widower. He died on 19 January 1950, aged 78.
