= Joe Leeming =

English footballer

Personal information
- Full name: Joseph Leeming
- Date of birth: 22 September 1876
- Place of birth: Preston, England
- Date of death: 30 April 1962 (aged 85)
- Place of death: Turton, England
- Height: 5 ft 7 in (1.70 m)
- Position: Full back

Senior career*
Years	Team	Apps	(Gls)
- Turton
1897–1907	Bury	258	(18)
1907–1914	Brighton Hove & Albion	193	(0)
1914–1915	Chorley		
- * Club domestic league appearances and goals

Joseph Leeming (22 September 1876 – 30 April 1962) was an English footballer who played in the Football League for Bury and in the Southern League for Brighton & Hove Albion.

He also represented an England league team and was on the winning side of the highest scoring FA Cup final ever. He is the father of the footballer Clifford Leeming, born 1920 who went on to play for various clubs including Bolton Wanderers, Bury and Tranmere Rovers.
