= Willie Wood (footballer) =

English footballer

Personal information
- Full name: William Wood
- Date of birth: 19 October 1878
- Place of birth: Middleton, Greater Manchester, England
- Date of death: 1947 (aged 68–69)
- Position: Inside forward

Senior career*
Years	Team	Apps	(Gls)
1897–1898	Middleton		
1898–1905	Bury	189	(63)
1905	Fulham		
1905–1907	Norwich City		
1907–1908	Leyton		
1908	New Brompton		
Total		189	(63)
- * Club domestic league appearances and goals

William Wood (19 October 1878–1947) was an English footballer who played in the Football League for Bury. Wood scored in both the 1900 FA Cup Final and 1903 FA Cup Final.
