= Archie Montgomery =

Scottish footballer

Archibald Montgomery (born 27 January 1873 – 5 January 1922) was a Scottish footballer. His regular position was as a goalkeeper. He was born in Chryston, Lanarkshire. He played for Manchester United, Rangers, and Bury. He would also manage Albion Rovers at the end of his career.
