= Bury F.C. =

Association football club in Bury, Greater Manchester, England

Bury
- Full name: Bury Football Club
- Nickname: The Shakers
- Founded: 1885; 141 years ago
- Ground: Gigg Lane
- Capacity: 12,500
- Owner: Football Supporters' Society of Bury Limited (50+1)
- Manager: Anthony Johnson
- League: Northern Premier League Premier Division
- 2025–26: Northern Premier League Division One West, 1st of 22 (promoted)
- Website: www.buryfc.co.uk
Home colours	Away colours

Bury Football Club is an English association football club based in Bury, Greater Manchester. Their home ground since 1885 has been Gigg Lane, one of the world's oldest football stadiums. The team most recently competed in the 2025–26 season of the Northern Premier League (NPL) Division One West, the eighth tier of the English football pyramid. Having won promotion as champions, they will play in the seventh tier NPL Premier Division in the 2026–27 season. Before expulsion from the English Football League in August 2019, Bury FC had played in EFL League Two, the fourth tier, in the 2018–19 season. The team are known as "The Shakers", and play in white shirts and navy blue shorts. Bury have a traditional rivalry with their neighbours Bolton Wanderers.

Established in 1885, Bury was a founder member of the Lancashire League in 1889, and champions in 1890–91 and 1891–92, before being elected to the Football League in 1894. Bury won the Second Division in 1894–95, and promotion to the First Division in which they played for 17 seasons. They won the FA Cup in 1900 with a 4–0 victory over Southampton, and again in 1903 with a record 6–0 win over Derby County. Bury were relegated to the Second Division at the end of the 1911–12 season, and were there for twelve years until securing promotion as runners-up in 1923–24. They were relegated in 1928–29, their last top-flight season. In 1956–57, they dropped into the third tier for the first time but won promotion as champions of the Third Division under Dave Russell in 1960–61. From 1967 to 1971, they had one promotion and three relegations, the last of which was from the Third to the Fourth Division.

Bury won promotion at the end of the 1973–74 campaign, and remained in the Third Division until 1979–80. Under manager Martin Dobson, Bury won promotion back to Division Three in 1984–85. In 1990 and 1991, the club qualified for the Third Division playoffs, but were then relegated in 1992. In 1995, Stan Ternent became team manager, leading the team back to the second tier for the first time in 28 years after securing two consecutive promotions in 1995–96 and 1996–97. The club stayed there for just two seasons before being relegated twice in four seasons. They secured promotion out of League Two in 2010–11. After that, Bury switched between Leagues One and Two, being twice relegated (in 2012–13 and 2017–18) and twice promoted (in 2014–15 and 2018–19). Bury finished the 2018–19 season as runners-up in League Two, earning promotion to League One for the 2019–20 season. However, the club was unable to begin the season because of longstanding financial difficulties, and was expelled from the Football League on 27 August 2019.

In November 2020, the club was placed in administration. A phoenix club, Bury AFC, owned by the Shakers Community Society, competed in the North West Counties Football League, the tenth tier of the English football league system, in the 2020–21 season. In February 2022, a Bury FC fans' group called Est.1885 completed the purchase of Gigg Lane from the administrator, and acquired the trading name, history and memorabilia of Bury FC. Est.1885 became the Bury Football Club Supporters' Society. The two societies merged in May 2023. As a result, Bury AFC adopted the Bury FC playing name ahead of the 2023–24 season, and returned to Gigg Lane, following Football Association approval on 5 June 2023. Upon merging, the two teams' histories were combined—retroactively counting Bury AFC's seasons as seasons for Bury FC. Since then, Bury have successfully progressed from the tenth tier to the seventh.

== History ==
=== Formation and early years: 1885–1895 ===
Bury Football Club was founded on 24 April 1885 after Aiden Arrowsmith, a local enthusiast, had brokered two meetings between church teams Bury Wesleyans and Bury Unitarians at the Waggon & Horses Hotel and the Old White Horse Hotel. (Note: The Bury Football Club Company Ltd was incorporated on 9 July 1897. Its first Articles of Association list seven directors: two innkeepers, a fish and game dealer, a mechanic, a pawnbroker, a commercial traveller, and a cashier.) It was agreed from the outset that the team should be professional. The FA had recently legitimised professionalism but it was still a controversial topic. Ahead of the 1885–86 season, the club leased a plot of land on Gigg Lane from the Earl of Derby's estate. On 12 September 1885, the first match played there was a friendly against a team from Wigan and Bury won 4–3.

The club first entered the FA Cup in 1887–88 and were drawn to play Blackburn Rovers away from home in the first round. They travelled to Ewood Park but scratched before the game. The two teams played a friendly match instead, which Bury lost heavily by 10–0. Some sources, including the Rec.Sport.Soccer Statistics Foundation (RSSSF), have recorded the friendly as a first-round FA Cup tie. The Football Association, however, lists the result as a walkover by Blackburn, recognising that Bury withdrew from the competition. This is confirmed by the Lancashire Evening Post's evening edition of the same day, which reported that "Bury scratched before the match, and played an ordinary game". Bury FC do not include the tie in their complete FA Cup record.

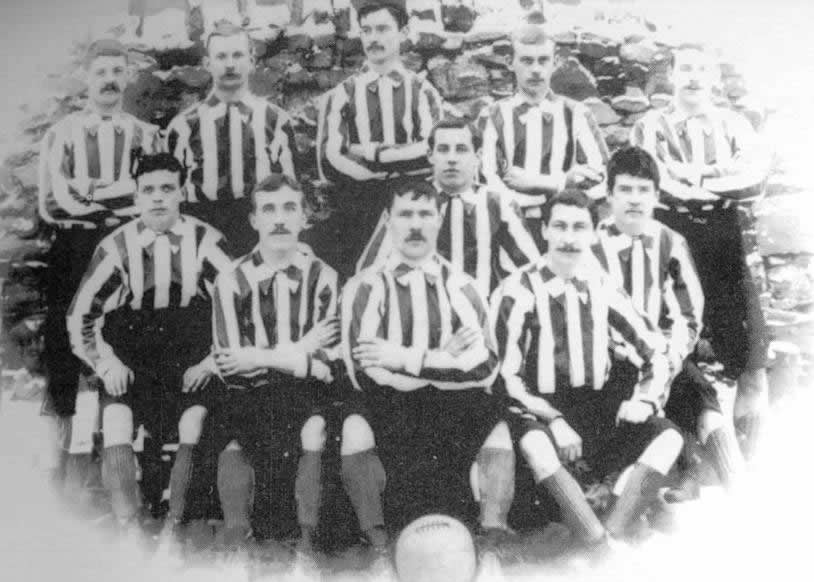
Bury team pictured in 1892

Bury were founder members of the Lancashire League in 1889, finishing as runners-up in the inaugural 1889–90 competition. They won the championship the next two seasons. In 1891–92, Bury were Lancashire Cup winners for the first time, and they have won this competition a total of eleven times, most recently in 2017–18. The club's nickname—"The Shakers"—was first used at the 1892 Lancashire Cup final against Blackburn Rovers. Before the match, J. T. Ingham, the club's chairman manager, reportedly inspired the players by saying: "We shall shake 'em! In fact, we are the Shakers". His words were popularised by the media and the club subsequently adopted the term as their official nickname. Also in 1891–92, Bury contested an FA Cup tie for the first time when they defeated Witton and Heywood Central before losing to Blackpool after a replay in the third qualifying round.

In 1894, the club was elected to the Football League. In their first season, 1894–95, they won the Second Division title by a nine-point margin and beat Liverpool, the First Division's bottom club, in the test match to gain promotion.

=== Top-flight status and FA Cup victories: 1895–1929 ===
Bury retained their top-flight status for seventeen seasons until they were relegated to the Second Division after the 1911–12 season (they finished in the relegation positions in the 1904–05 season but avoided relegation when the capacity of Division One was increased from eighteen to twenty clubs). In 1900 and 1903, Bury won the FA Cup, scoring ten goals in the two finals without conceding any.

In the 1900 final, they beat Southern League team Southampton 4–0. Bury's run to the final was remarkable in that they were drawn away from home in every round but won through with victories over Burnley, Notts County, cup holders Sheffield United and Nottingham Forest. The semi-final against Forest was played at Stoke and ended 1–1 after Bury missed a penalty. A replay was held at Bramall Lane in Sheffield and Bury began disastrously by conceding two goals in the first two minutes. Charlie Sagar pulled one back after 55 minutes and then Jasper McLuckie equalised with only five minutes to go. Extra time was played and Sagar scored the winner after 110 minutes of play. The final at the old Crystal Palace ground was played in a heatwave and Bury, captained by Jack Pray, dominated from the start. The goals in a one-sided match were scored by McLuckie (2), Willie Wood and Jack Plant. The players were on a win bonus of £10 each in the final, ten times more than their usual £1 per match bonus.

Three years later, Bury did not concede a goal in any round. En route to the final against Derby County, Bury defeated Wolverhampton Wanderers, Sheffield United, Notts County and Aston Villa. As in 1900, the final was played at the old Crystal Palace ground in south London. A crowd of 63,102 attended. As the two teams wore identical kits, agreement on colours for the day was necessary and they both changed with Bury wearing Cambridge blue shirts and navy shorts while Derby chose red shirts and black shorts.

Six of Bury's 1900 finalists were in the 1903 team, led by skipper George Ross who scored the opening goal after 20 minutes. Derby's keeper Jack Fryer played despite an existing injury which he aggravated early in the second half when he was trying to prevent Charlie Sagar from scoring Bury's second goal. As a result, Fryer was forced to leave the field and, as substitutes were not allowed then, one of the full-backs deputised in goal and their team was down to ten men for most of the last forty minutes. Bury scored three goals in four minutes just before the hour was up and their sixth after 76 minutes. Joe Leeming scored the third and last goals. Willie Wood and Jack Plant scored the other two. The final was a no contest and Derby were lambasted by the press for their poor performance. One reporter commented that, but for being merciful, Bury should have scored twenty. Bury's 6–0 win established an FA Cup final record for the biggest winning margin. Bury remained sole holders of the record until the 2019 final in which Manchester City defeated Watford by the same score. The ball used in the 1903 final is on display at the National Football Museum.

Until 1907, the team was always managed by one or more committee members. Club secretary Harry Spencer Hamer is believed to have been in charge of the team in both the 1900 and 1903 FA Cup finals, but he was never formally appointed team manager. The first specialist team manager was goalkeeper Archie Montgomery who was appointed on 1 February 1907. He was in charge when the team were relegated in 1912 and stayed on until 30 April 1915 when he was dismissed because of the club's lack of income in wartime. The club had a windfall in 1922 when Edward Stanley, 17th Earl of Derby, unexpectedly gifted them with the freehold of Gigg Lane. The team returned to the First Division for a five-season spell in 1924 and achieved their highest-ever league position, fourth, in 1925–26. Bury have not played in the top flight since relegation back to the Second Division in 1929.

=== Football in the Second and Third Division: 1929–1969 ===
Chart of table positions of Bury in the Football League

Striving to recover First Division status, Bury had four top six finishes in Division Two in the 1930s. The closest that they have ever come to a top flight return was in 1936–37 when they finished third (only the first two teams were promoted).

With first-class league and cup football suspended for the duration of World War II, regional wartime competitions were organised in which Bury took part. Like all other clubs, they often relied on guest players because of service calls. There were ten regional leagues in 1939–40 and Bury were in the North West League, finishing as champions. The team were unbeaten in a sequence of 16 matches from October to February. On 30 December 1939, they played a friendly against Stoke City which resulted in a 7–6 win for Bury.

Bury were close to relegation from the Second Division several times after the war. They finally dropped into the Third Division North for the first time in 1957. 1957–58 was that division's last season before the regional sections were amalgamated into national Third and Fourth Divisions.

Under manager Dave Russell, a young Bury team were Third Division champions in 1960–61. They spent seven of the next eight seasons back in the Second Division with a best position of eighth in 1962–63. In the 1962–63 Football League Cup, they reached the semi-final but lost 4–3 on aggregate to eventual winners Birmingham City. For three seasons from 1963, Bury's best player was the future England midfielder Colin Bell, who was team captain while still a teenager. He transferred to Manchester City in 1966 and Bury were relegated the following season. They bounced straight back as Third Division runners-up in 1968 but went down again in 1969.

=== Fourth-tier debut and return to the second tier: 1969–2000 ===
In 1971, relegation from Division Three took Bury into the Fourth Division for the first time. They gained promotion in 1974 and spent six seasons in the Third Division before the next relegation. The club celebrated its centenary in 1985 by gaining promotion back to the Third Division.

Bury came close to promotion from the Third Division in both 1990 and 1991 when they finished fifth and seventh, respectively, to qualify for the play-offs. They were eliminated at the semi-final stage in both play-offs, losing 2–0 on aggregate to Tranmere Rovers in 1990 and 2–1 on aggregate to neighbours Bolton Wanderers in 1991. Relegation followed in 1992 and then Bury qualified for the fourth-tier play-off in 1993 by finishing seventh but, yet again, lost their semi-final tie by going down 1–0 on aggregate to York City. Bury were back in the play-offs again in 1995 after finishing fourth. This time, they won their semi-final by beating Preston North End 2–0 on aggregate and so went to Wembley for the final, where they lost 2–0 to Chesterfield.

The club then enjoyed a resurgence under manager Stan Ternent who engineered two successive promotions in the mid-1990s. In 1996, third place in what was now the fourth-tier Division Three, followed by the third-tier Division Two title in 1996–97, brought Bury back to the second tier for the first time in 30 years. They went back to the third tier on the last day of the 1998–99 season on the basis of having a lower goals scored total than Port Vale, the League having decided to use this metric rather than goal difference as its tie-breaker. Bury's goal difference was higher than that of Port Vale, and the League reinstated goal difference as the tie-breaker for the following season.

=== Return to the lower divisions: 2001–2019 ===
In 2001–02, financial problems caused by the collapse of ITV Digital brought the club into administration and to the brink of folding. A supporters' campaign raised enough money to keep the club afloat, and in recognition of his role within that process, UEFA presented club press officer Gordon Sorfleet with their Best Supporter award for 2001–02. Bury were relegated to fourth-tier Division Three at the end of that season. They finished seventh in 2003 and qualified for the play-offs but, yet again, their semi-final hoodoo struck and they were beaten 3–1 on aggregate by Bournemouth.

In May 2005, Bury became the first (and to date the only) football club to score a thousand goals in each of the top four tiers of the English football league. A year later, in December 2006, the club was expelled from the FA Cup after they were found to have fielded an ineligible player in a second-round replay win against Chester City. In addition to that debacle, the team's 2006–07 league form was poor and they eventually finished in 21st place, the club's lowest-ever position, narrowly avoiding relegation from the Football League.

In the 2008–09 season, newly appointed manager Alan Knill, led the team to a fourth-place finish, missing automatic promotion by a single goal; in the play-off semi-final, Bury were beaten on penalties by Shrewsbury Town after a 1–1 aggregate draw. Towards the end of the 2010–11 season, with the team chasing promotion, Knill left the club for Scunthorpe United. Youth team manager Richie Barker took over as caretaker manager and secured the club's promotion to League One, the team finishing second.

In December 2012, Bury were placed under a transfer embargo after falling into financial difficulty as a result of poor attendance figures, and ended up being relegated at the end of the season. Property investor Stewart Day became chairman of the club in May 2013 and later that year he noted that £1.5 million had been invested in the club, mostly to pay off debt. Bury finished the 2014–15 League Two season in third place with a club-record points haul of 85 and earned promotion back to third-tier League One, where they spent the next three seasons. The team finished bottom of the 2017–18 EFL League One table and returned to League Two for the second time in five seasons.

In May 2018, the former Bury striker Ryan Lowe was appointed first-team manager on a two-year contract, having been caretaker-manager twice during 2017–18 after two other managers were sacked. In June 2018, Lee Dykes became the club's first sporting director and introduced a youth development strategy designed to fast-track academy players into the first team at the earliest opportunity. Having three times reached the northern semi-final stage of the EFL Trophy in its earlier incarnations, Bury in the 2018–19 tournament advanced to the national semi-final where they lost 3–0 at home to Portsmouth. The team had a good season in League Two and, during the winter months, went 14 successive matches unbeaten before winning promotion to League One after a 1–1 draw at Tranmere Rovers on 30 April.

=== EFL expulsion, merger: 2019–2023 ===
Businessman Steve Dale bought the club in December 2018 and, in February 2019, paid an outstanding tax bill to avoid a HM Revenue and Customs (HMRC) winding-up order. However, financial problems resurfaced after staff and players did not receive their March 2019 salaries on time. Former head coach Chris Brass and HMRC both pursued High Court claims against the club. Dale proposed a Company Voluntary Arrangement (CVA) which was approved by creditors and winding-up actions were dismissed on 31 July. The EFL sought details on the CVA and proof of the club's financial viability, threatening to expel Bury from the League. No proof was provided, and the club's opening fixtures were suspended. On 8 August, Bury was given 14 days to provide the EFL with a plan to pay off outstanding creditors, later extended to 24 then 27 August. A sale of the club fell through, and on 27 August, the EFL announced that Bury's membership of the league had been withdrawn (Bury became the first club to be expelled from the Football League since Maidstone United in 1992). Efforts to arrange Bury's re-admission to the EFL were rejected at a meeting of the EFL's remaining 71 member clubs on 26 September.

While the formation of a fan-owned phoenix club, Bury AFC, was underway, Dale continued to fight administration and to seek a return to the football pyramid. If payments under the terms of the July 2019 CVA were not made by 11 February 2020, creditors could petition for the club to be wound up. Dale defaulted on the plan, making liquidation more likely. A bid to complete a solvent takeover of the club fell through at the end of March, while an application to the FA for a place in the National League or National League North was rejected in August 2020. Twelve months after the club's EFL expulsion, the Manchester Evening News said: "Bury FC still exists, though, if only on paper. With no players, no league to play in, and no employees to speak of, it is little more than a hollow shell of the club fans knew and loved."

On 27 November 2020, Dale finally placed the club into administration, with debts of over £12.5 million. In May 2021, the club's Gigg Lane ground was put up for sale. A fans-backed group, Est.1885, was among the bidders, and in October 2021, was given exclusivity to buy both the club and Gigg Lane. In January 2022, Est.1885 signed a deal to buy the stadium, the club's trading name and memorabilia, though finalisation of the deal would ultimately require a successful merger with Bury AFC. Tensions between the two groups, and FA restrictions about using the Bury FC name delayed completion of the merger.

Bury AFC had successfully applied to the North West Counties Football League, the tenth tier of the English football league system, for membership in the 2020–21 season. The side lost its first game, an FA Vase tie played on 19 September, then the NWCFL season was suspended in December 2020 due to COVID-19 restrictions and later abandoned. The following season, Bury AFC played in the North West Counties Football League Division One North, and in March 2022 secured promotion to the NWCFL Premier Division as divisional champions.

In May 2022, the Bury FC Supporters Society signed a memorandum of understanding (MoU) regarding the future of the club. In July 2022, Bury fans were asked to back a merger of the two principal supporters' groups (BFCSS and the Shakers Community Society) to bring Bury FC back to its "spiritual home with wider benefits for the whole community". In an October 2022 poll, amid continuing tensions between the two groups, the proposals failed to reach the required 66% threshold from both societies. In May 2023, members of both Bury FC and Bury AFC voted to merge the two clubs. On 5 June 2023, the club said that the FA had confirmed that the name "Bury Football Club" could be used in competition for the first time since August 2019, with the club competing in the Premier Division of the North West Counties League, the ninth tier of the English football pyramid.

=== North West Counties League: 2023–2025 ===
On 17 September 2023, after a run of form that saw two wins in eight games, Bury sacked manager Andy Welsh, who was succeeded by Dave McNabb. After finishing third in the league, in May 2024, Bury were beaten by Wythenshawe Town in the Premier Division play-off final via a penalty shoot-out, missing out on promotion. Less than a year later, on 19 April 2025, Bury defeated Burscough 4–0 on the final day of the 2024–25 NWCL season in front of 8,719 supporters to earn promotion as champions to the Northern Premier League West Division.

=== Northern Premier League: 2025–present ===
In December 2025, with the club fourth after 20 games, McNabb stepped down as manager to take up a new role as head of football operations; Tim Lees was appointed interim manager. On 12 December 2025, Michael Jolley took over as manager but left by mutual consent two days later following disapproval from the fanbase due to a 2009 incident; Lees resumed as interim manager until the appointment of Anthony Johnson in February 2026. On 25 April 2026, Bury won the league title and secured promotion to the NPL Premier Division with a 3–0 victory at Atherton Collieries.

== Colours and crest ==
The club's colours have been white and either navy blue or royal blue. Originally, the team wore a half sky blue half chocolate brown shirt before soon changing to a striped shirt with blue shorts, but the stripes were replaced by the long-established all-white shirt before the club joined the Football League in 1894. There was an exception in the 1962–63 season when a mistake was made by the club's kit suppliers, who sent a consignment of royal blue shorts before the season instead of the usual navy blue. Then manager Bob Stokoe said the club could have sent them back but decided simply to keep them for the season; he joked that royal blue "would tone with the Gigg Lane paintwork."

Despite playing in white shorts in the first two years of the club's history, blue has been the predominant colour of this part of Bury's kit since 1888. Navy was the colour from 1888 through to 1962. From then until 1986 the team wore royal blue, before the switch was made to a darker shade which lasted until 1994 when royal blue was reintroduced. Barring the 2009–10 125th anniversary season and the 2014–15 promotion season when white was the adopted colour, royal blue remained the colour of the team's shorts until its last season in the Football League, when navy blue was chosen again.

The crest on the shirt is a representation of the coat of arms granted to the former County Borough of Bury by the College of Arms on 28 February 1877. This depicts the town's industrial heritage with images in the shield of an anvil, a fleece, shuttles and a papyrus plant which, respectively, represent forging, wool, cotton and paper. It bears the inscription Vincit Omnia Industria (work conquers all).

== Stadium ==
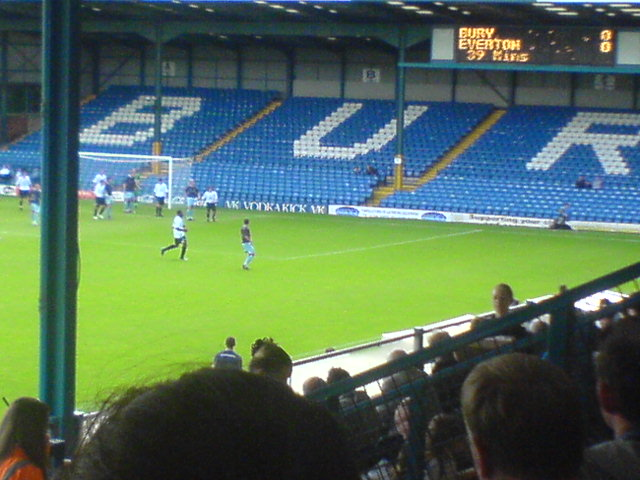
Gigg Lane in 2007

Bury have played at Gigg Lane since 1885 when they rented the plot from the Earl of Derby's estate soon after the club's foundation. The first Football League match played there was on 8 September 1894 when Bury defeated Manchester City 4–2. A floodlit match took place in 1889 but there were no permanent lights until 1953. Until the 1990s when a complete rebuild became necessary, the capacity of the ground was 35,000. That total was achieved when Bury hosted an FA Cup third-round tie against neighbouring Bolton Wanderers on 9 January 1960. The game ended 1–1, but Bury lost the replay 4–2 after extra time.

Gigg Lane was rebuilt in the 1990s and now has a capacity of 12,500, all seated and covered. The Main Stand, also called the Family Stand, is on the northern side and houses the club offices and dressing rooms. At the western end, the Manchester Road End houses away supporters. The South Stand is opposite the Main Stand and adjoins the Cemetery End, left (east) of the Main Stand. The Cemetery End was the last part of the rebuilt stadium to be completed, in 1999.

In August 2019, when Bury FC was expelled from the EFL, Gigg Lane was officially known for sponsorship purposes as the Planet-U Energy Stadium, and it was completely powered by renewable energy provided by the sponsors. Previous deals had seen the ground named the JD Stadium, and the Energy Check Stadium.

In 2020, when Bury F.C. and Bury AFC were considered separate teams, there was no possibility of Bury AFC playing its matches at Gigg Lane, and a groundshare was agreed with Radcliffe FC for the 2020–21 NWCFL season, so the team's home venue was the 4,000 capacity Stainton Park in Radcliffe, about 2.5 miles (4 km) south-west of Bury. Bury AFC enquired about renting Gigg Lane but the request was rejected on 5 April 2022 as "not feasible" by the Bury FC Supporters Society who cited commercial risks and imbalances that could jeopardise a future merger with Bury AFC. In March 2023, Bury AFC temporarily agreed to play their final home fixtures at Mossley's Seel Park due to poor ground conditions at Radcliffe caused by bad weather and additional fixtures.

On 8 July 2023, Bury FC played their first game back at Gigg Lane in a pre-season friendly against Bradford City, which Bradford won 6–0.

On 3 July 2026, the club announced a commercial partnership deal with Salford Van & Car Hire, who became the club's 'Official Stadium Naming Rights Principal Partner' ahead of the 2026–27 season.

== Players and coaching staff ==
=== Current squad ===
As of 18 November 2026

Note: Flags indicate national team as defined under FIFA eligibility rules; some limited exceptions apply. Players may hold more than one non-FIFA nationality.

Pos.	Nation	Player
GK	ENG	Mitchell Allen
GK	ENG	Harvey Hampson (dual-registered Atherton Laburnum Rovers)
GK	ENG	Bradley Sullivan (on loan at Wythenshawe Town)
DF	IRL	John Clarke (loan at 1874 Northwich)
DF	ENG	Ollie Younger
DF	ENG	Charlie Cox (dual-registered Lower Breck)
DF	ENG	Louis Isherwood
DF	ENG	Calum Hudson (on loan from Barnsley)
DF	ENG	James Melhado
DF	ENG	James Nield ( Captain)
DF	ENG	Connor Pye
DF	ENG	Bailey Sloane
MF	ENG	Bobby Carroll (Vice-captain)
MF	ENG	George Glendon
MF	ENG	Leo Graham
MF	ENG	Ryley Smith

Pos.	Nation	Player
MF	ENG	Freddie Machell (on loan at Clitheroe)
MF	ENG	Owen Robinson
MF	ENG	Brad Mundy
MF	ENG	Murat Aydogan
MF	ENG	Oscar Threlkeld
MF	ENG	Louis White (on loan at Wythenshawe FC)
MF	ENG	Daniel Adshead
FW	ENG	Tom Carr
FW	ENG	Anthony Dudley (on loan at Ashton United)
FW	WAL	Kai Evans
FW	ENG	Oliver Hodgson (on loan at Longridge Town)
FW	ENG	Djavan Pedro
FW	LAT	Rustam Stepans
FW	ENG	Dom Telford
FW	WAL	Momodou Touray
FW	NGR	Jesurun Uchegbulam (on loan at Hyde United)

=== Full international players ===
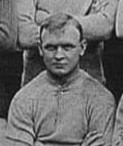
Jimmy Settle, 1906

Jimmy Settle was the first Bury player to win a full international cap, playing for England against Ireland in Sunderland on 18 February 1899, and scoring a second-half hat-trick in England's 13–2 victory. Bill Gorman and Derek Spence were Bury's most capped international players, each earning 10 caps while at Bury, for Ireland and Northern Ireland, respectively. Neil Danns was the most recent Bury player to win a full international cap, on 26 June 2019, when he played in Guyana's third and final 2019 CONCACAF Gold Cup group stage game, against Trinidad.

Jack Plant played for Bury for 17 years apart from one short loan period at Reading. He played and scored in both the 1900 and 1903 FA Cup Finals, and made one international appearance for England against Scotland in 1900.

Player		Country	Caps	Goals	Year(s) of caps	Notes
Bill Gorman	(Republic of Ireland)	Ireland (FAI)	10	0	1936–1938	
Derek Spence	(Northern Ireland)	Northern Ireland	10	1	1975–1976	
Jimmy Chambers	(Ireland)	Ireland (IFA)	8	2	1927–1930	
Neil Danns	(Guyana)	Guyana	6	6	2018–2019	^{1}
Bhaichung Bhutia	(India)	India	6	2	2000–2001	
Norman Bullock	(England)	England	3	2	1923–1926	
Phil Hughes	(Northern Ireland)	Northern Ireland	3	0	1986–1987	
Jimmy Settle	(England)	England	3	4	1899	
Charlie Sagar	(England)	England	2	1	1900–1902	
David Healy	(Northern Ireland)	Northern Ireland	2	1	2012–2013	
Hugh Tinney	(Scotland)	Scotland	2	0	1967	
Lutel James	(Saint Kitts and Nevis)	St Kitts and Nevis	2	0	2000	
Jack Ball	(England)	England	1	0	1927	
Tom Bradshaw	(Scotland)	Scotland	1	0	1928	
Billy Hibbert	(England)	England	1	0	1910	
Jack Plant	(England)	England	1	0	1900	
Jap Walker	(Ireland)	Ireland	1	0	1911	

^{1} Danns scored three goals in qualifying games, then three in three games in the 2019 CONCACAF Gold Cup group stage.

=== Other notable players ===
Other notable players, with full international caps after or before their times at Bury, include (in alphabetical order):

- Colin Bell, a midfielder signed from Horden Colliery Welfare as a youth player, played 82 times for Bury, scoring 25 times, between July 1963 and March 1966, and became club captain in 1964 while still a teenager. He joined Manchester City and made 48 international England appearances.
- Luther Blissett, a centre-forward with 14 England caps, was signed from Watford, aged 35, in August 1993 and played ten games for Bury, scoring once.
- Paul Butler made 84 appearances (1996–1998); one cap for Ireland.
- Reice Charles-Cook, a Bury goalkeeper (two games in the 2013–2014 season) who later gained seven Grenada caps.
- John Connelly, from 1970 to 1973 played 129 games, scoring 37 goals, for Bury, having earlier earned 20 England caps, scoring seven goals.
- Lee Dixon, in 1985-1986 played 57 matches, scoring seven goals, before moving to Stoke City and Arsenal and earning 22 England caps
- Martin Dobson, from 1984 to 1986 played 68 matches scoring five goals, having earlier earned five England caps.
- Leighton James from 1984 to 1985, played 49 matches scoring five goals, having earlier earned 54 caps for Wales.
- Forward Colin Kazim-Richards started his career as a 15-year-old at Bury in 2001, playing 30 matches scoring three goals in 2005, later going on to play for Turkey.
- Dean Kiely was a Bury goalkeeper (137 matches, 1996–1999) who later played 11 matches for Ireland.
- Terry McDermott, from 1969 to 1972 played 101 matches scoring 10 goals. Later moved to Newcastle and Liverpool, and earned 25 England caps.
- Nick Pope, a Bury goalkeeper (22 matches in 2015) who later earned 10 England caps.
- Kasper Schmeichel, Bury goalkeeper in 26 matches in 2006 loan spells. Earned 118 caps with Denmark.
- Goalkeeper Neville Southall played 49 games at the start of his career for Bury before a 1981 move to Everton and 92 caps for Wales.
- Frédéric Veseli made 18 Bury appearances during a loan spell in 2014, and went on to earn 44 caps for Albania.

== Managerial history ==
The club was founded in 1885 but there is no record of anyone managing the team until Tom Hargreaves, who was a committee member, in 1890. One or more committee members took team responsibility until the appointment of erstwhile goalkeeper Archie Montgomery in 1907 as the first specialist team manager. Montgomery was dismissed during World War One for financial reasons but the first manager to be sacked for poor results was James Hunter-Thompson in February 1927, even though his team had achieved the club's highest-ever league position, finishing fourth in 1925–26.

Norman Bullock, who was the club's then-record goalscorer, took over in December 1935 but went to Chesterfield in June 1938. After the Second World War, Bullock returned to Bury until November 1949 when he went to Leicester City. The club's longest-serving manager has been Dave Russell for eight years from December 1953 to December 1961. The highlight of his career was winning the Third Division championship in 1960–61. Bob Stokoe was team manager twice between 1961 and 1978. In the early 1970s, Allan Brown held the post for eighteen months before moving to Nottingham Forest where, until 3 January 1975, he was Brian Clough's predecessor.

With Bury consigned to the lower leagues from the 1970s onwards, there have been several sackings as successive managers were unable to regain Second Division status. A measure of success was finally achieved in the late 1990s when Stan Ternent inspired the team to successive promotions from fourth tier to third in 1995–96 and, as champions, from third to second in 1996–97. He left in 1998 to take over at Burnley and, a couple of seasons later, Bury were back in the lower league where they have stayed amid worrying financial issues. The club had a disastrous season in 2017–18 when the team finished bottom of League One and two managers were sacked. The club's former striker Ryan Lowe took full charge in May 2018, having twice been caretaker in 2017–18, before leaving in June 2019 to join Plymouth Argyle. On 2 July 2019, Paul Wilkinson was appointed as manager, but managed no first team games due to the club's EFL expulsion the following month.

== Bury FC Women ==
As women's football developed in the 1990s, Bury became one of several professional clubs to establish a ladies' team or to accept an existing one as an affiliate. Bury FC Women, also known as the Bury FC Foundation Women's Team, was founded in 1996. They were founder members of the North West Women's Regional Football League (NWWRFL) Premier Division in 2003–04. They played in the NWWFRL for 16 seasons. In the 2018–19 season, they won the Division One North championship, earning promotion back to the Premier Division, which is now the fifth tier of the women's football pyramid. After Bury FC collapsed, the ladies' team lost many of its players and had to rely on charitable funding. They managed to stay afloat but were obliged to seek membership of a lower league.

The ladies' team played numerous matches at Gigg Lane until 2019. After its closure that year, their home venue was the Goshen Sports Centre on Tennyson Avenue in Bury. On Sunday, 24 April 2022, they returned to Gigg Lane for a Lancashire FA Women's County League match against Fleetwood Town Wrens. This was the first match of any kind to be played there since May 2019. Bury FC Women won 3–0 (1–0 at half-time) before a crowd of almost 500, the goalscorers being Lucy Golding, Kimberley Tyson and Sophie Coates.

In the 2021–22 season, Bury FC Women were managed by Colin Platt and played in the eighth tier Championship Division of the Lancashire FA Women's County League. On 15 May 2022, they won the division title by defeating second-placed Clitheroe Wolves Ladies 2–0 at Gigg Lane, both goals scored by Kimberley Tyson. The match attracted a crowd of 655, a ground record for a ladies' match. Two days later, the Bury FC Supporters Society announced that a Service Level Agreement would ensure Bury FC Women's future home fixtures would be played at Gigg Lane.

== Honours ==
League

- Second Division (level 2)
  - Champions: 1894–95
  - Runners-up: 1923–24
- Third Division / Second Division (level 3)
  - Champions: 1960–61, 1996–97
  - Runners-up: 1967–68
- Fourth Division / Third Division / League Two (level 4)
  - Runners-up: 2010–11, 2018–19
  - Promoted: 1973–74, 1984–85, 1995–96, 2014–15
- Northern Premier League Division One West (level 8)
  - Champions: 2025–26
- North West Counties Football League Premier Division (level 9)
  - Champions: 2024–25
- North West Counties Football League Division One North (level 10)
  - Champions: 2021–22

Cup

- FA Cup
  - Winners: 1899–1900, 1902–03
- Football World Championship:
  - Winners: 1904 (Anglo-Scottish competition, 1876–1904)

Wartime tournaments

- Winners: North West League, 1939–40

Other tournaments

- Lancashire League
  - Winners: 1890–91, 1891–92
- Lancashire Cup
  - Winners (11): 1892, 1899, 1903, 1906, 1926, 1958, 1983, 1987, 2014, 2015, 2018
- Lancashire Junior Cup
  - Winners: 1890
- Manchester Cup
  - Winners (12): 1894, 1896, 1897, 1900, 1903, 1905, 1925, 1935, 1951, 1952, 1962, 1968
- U-23 Lancashire cup Winners

== Records and statistics ==
=== English football records ===
- Bury jointly (with Manchester City, 2019) hold the record for the widest winning margin in an FA Cup Final (6–0 v Derby County, 1903).
- In 2005, Bury became the first (and still only) club to score 1,000 goals in each of the four professional tiers in England.

=== Club records ===
The club's records are listed on its own website:

- Highest league finish (pre-2019): 4th in the Football League First Division, 1925–26
- Highest league finish (post-2020): 1st in the Northern Premier League Division One West (level 8), 2025–26
- Record league victory: 10–1 v Skelmersdale United, North West Counties Premier Division, 27 January 2024; 9-0 v Trafford FC, Northern Premier League West, 6 February 2026
- Record cup victory: 12–1 v Stockton, FA Cup first round replay, 2 February 1897
- Record league defeat: 0–8 Sheffield United, First Division, 6 April 1896; 0–8 Swindon Town, Third Division, 8 December 1979
- Record cup defeat: 0–10 West Ham United, League Cup second round, 25 October 1983
- Most points in a league season: 109, North West Counties Football League Premier Division, 2024–25
- Most wins in a league season: 33, North West Counties Football League Premier Division, 2024–25
- Most goals in a league season: 131, North West Counties Football League Premier Division, 2024–25
- Top goalscorer in a season: Craig Madden, 43 goals in 1981–82 (35 league & 8 Cup)
- Top goalscorer in a career: Craig Madden, 153 (129 league, 25 cup) goals from 1977 to 1986
- Most appearances: Norman Bullock, 539 (506 league, 33 Cup) games from 1920 to 1935
- Youngest player in a league game: Jimmy Kerr – 16 years and 15 days
- Oldest player in a league game: Bruce Grobbelaar – 40 years and 337 days
- Most capped players: Bill Gorman, 10 caps for Ireland and Derek Spence, 10 caps for Northern Ireland
- Record attendance: 35,000 v Bolton Wanderers, FA Cup third round, 9 January 1960
- Most undefeated league matches: 22 games – 2024–25
- Most undefeated home games: 25 – 1967–68 season
- Most undefeated away matches: 11 – 2015
- Most games consecutively scored in: Ryan Lowe, 9 games in 2010–11

=== Cup runs ===
==== Bury FC ====
- Best FA Cup performance (pre-2019): Champions, 1899–00, 1902–03
- Best FA Cup performance (post-2020): 4th qualifying round, 2024–25
- Best FA Trophy performance: 2nd qualifying round, 2025–26
- Best FA Vase performance: 2nd Round, 2024–25
- Best League Cup performance: Semi-finals, 1962–63
- Best League Trophy performance: Semi-finals, 2018–19

==== Bury AFC ====
- Best FA Cup performance: 4th qualifying round, 2022–23
- Best FA Vase performance: Quarter-finals, 2022–23

== Support ==
The club has a supporters group called Forever Bury, founded in 2002, who strive to help the club face its financial difficulties. In 2019, they ran a campaign called "Help Save Our Club". Bury have had a club mascot operating on the sidelines since 1997. The first, named after Robert Peel, was "Robbie the Bobby", a cartoon policeman whose antics embarrassed the club when he was sent off the field by referees three times in 2001 for bad behaviour—one of a number of incidents involving mascots that led to a Football League review of mascot behaviour. He was retired in 2018 to be replaced by a cartoon police dog. The club explained that "police dogs are key members of the force and are something the younger supporters can relate to". Following a children's naming competition, the new mascot was named "Peeler" to maintain the link with Peel. He made his debut in the home match against Yeovil Town on 4 August 2018.

== Rivalries ==
Gigg Lane is near to several other clubs in Greater Manchester and Lancashire, which means Bury have always been likely to play at least one "derby" match in any season. Traditionally, Bury's main rivalry has always been with their nearest neighbour Bolton Wanderers, and the head-to-head record between them is 30 wins each, and 19 draws. Matches between Bury and Rochdale have been dubbed the "M66 Derby", and their head-to-head record is 26 wins by Bury, 21 by Rochdale, and 21 draws.
