= 2012–13 FA Cup qualifying rounds =

Tournament details
- Country: England; Wales

The 2012–13 FA Cup qualifying rounds opened the 132nd season of competition in England for 'The Football Association Challenge Cup' (FA Cup), the world's oldest association football single knockout competition. A total of 758 clubs were accepted for the competition, down five from the previous season's 763.

The large number of clubs entering the tournament from lower down (Levels 5 through 10) in the English football pyramid meant that the competition started with six rounds of preliminary (2) and qualifying (4) knockouts for these non-League teams. The 32 winning clubs from fourth qualifying round progressed to the First round proper, where League clubs tiered at Levels 3 and 4 entered the competition.

== Calendar and prizes ==
The calendar for the 2012–13 FA Cup qualifying rounds, as announced by the FA.

Round	Main date	Leagues entering at this round	New entries this round	Winners from previous round	Number of fixtures	Prize money
Extra preliminary round	11 August 2012	Levels 9-10	400	none	200	£1,000
Preliminary round	25 August 2012	Level 8	132	200	166	£1,750
First qualifying round	8 September 2012	Level 7	66	166	116	£3,000
Second qualifying round	22 September 2012	Conference North; Conference South	44	116	80	£4,500
Third qualifying round	6 October 2012	none	none	80	40	£7,500
Fourth qualifying round	20 October 2012	Conference Premier	24	40	32	£12,500
For the next rounds look 2012–13 FA Cup

== Extra preliminary round ==
Extra preliminary round ties were played on Friday (10 August), Saturday (11 August) and Sunday (12 August). Replays were played on Monday (13 August), Tuesday (14 August) and Wednesday (15 August). The relative immediacy of the replays was due to there only being two weeks between consecutive rounds of the competition. 400 teams, from Level 9 and Level 10 of English football, entered at this stage of the competition.

Tie	Home team (tier)	Score	Away team (tier)	Att.
1	Dunston UTS (9)	2–0	Armthorpe Welfare (9)	175
2	Liversedge (9)	2–4	West Auckland Town (9)	237
3	Crook Town (10)	2–1	Penrith (9)	102
4	Thackley (9)	1–3	Hebburn Town (9)	99
5	Jarrow Roofing BCA (10)	1–1	Pickering Town (9)	38
replay	Pickering Town (9)	2–4	Jarrow Roofing BCA (10)	152
6	Newton Aycliffe (9)	1–1	Holker Old Boys (10)	136
replay	Holker Old Boys (10)	3–0	Newton Aycliffe (9)	101
7	Tadcaster Albion (9)	1–1	Consett (9)	123
replay	Consett (9)	2–3 (a.e.t.)	Tadcaster Albion (9)	140
8	Ashington (9)	1–1	Sunderland RCA (9)	230
replay	Sunderland RCA (9)	1–2	Ashington (9)	133
9	Chester-Le-Street Town (10)	0–0	Billingham Town (9)	76
replay	Billingham Town (9)	1–0	Chester-le-Street Town (10)	88
10	South Shields (9)	0–0	Darlington Railway Athletic (10)	106
replay	Darlington Railway Athletic (10)	5–6	South Shields (9)	107
11	Northallerton Town (10)	4–5	Guisborough Town (9)	118
12	Billingham Synthonia (9)	0–1	Celtic Nation (9)	153
13	Marske United (9)	1–0	Stokesley Sports Club (10)	160
14	North Shields (10)	1–1	Birtley Town (10)	146
replay	Birtley Town (10)	2–0	North Shields (10)	174
15	Durham City (9)	2–1	Newcastle Benfield (9)	102
16	Washington (10)	0–3	Esh Winning (10)	64
17	Tow Law Town (10)	0–2	Bishop Auckland (9)	136
18	Eccleshill United (10)	4–2	Glasshoughton Welfare (9)	28
19	Spennymoor Town (9)	1–0	Scarborough Athletic (9)	365
20	Bedlington Terriers (9)	2–1	Morpeth Town (10)	101
21	Pontefract Collieries (10)	2–2	Norton & Stockton Ancients (9)	88
replay	Norton & Stockton Ancients (9)	5–2 (a.e.t.)	Pontefract Collieries (10)	73
22	Silsden (9)	2–3	Brighouse Town (9)	123
23	Whitehaven (10)	0–3	Shildon (9)	84
24	West Allotment Celtic (10)	2–1	Selby Town (10)	85
25	Bridlington Town (9)	1–2	Whitley Bay (9)	206
26	Daisy Hill (10)	0–5	Formby (10)	60
27	AFC Blackpool (9)	3–6	AFC Liverpool (9)	92
28	Dinnington Town (10)	0–2	Atherton Collieries (10)	102
29	Irlam (10)	5–3	Hallam (10)	102
30	Bootle (9)	4–1	Alsager Town (9)	111
31	Maine Road (9)	3–0	Squires Gate (9)	85
32	Atherton Laburnum Rovers (10)	4–2	Rossington Main (10)	38
33	St. Helens Town (9)	1–5	Abbey Hey (10)	62
34	Padiham (9)	1–0	Wigan Robin Park (9)	135
35	Hemsworth Miners Welfare (10)	1–1	Runcorn Linnets (9)	197
replay	Runcorn Linnets (9)	2–2 (3–4 p)	Hemsworth Miners Welfare (10)	281
36	Colne (9)	0–0	Congleton Town (9)	66
replay	Congleton Town (9)	5–2	Colne (9)	111
37	Stockport Sports (9)	0–0	Ashton Athletic (9)	53
replay	Ashton Athletic (9)	2–1	Stockport Sports (9)	70
38	Cheadle Town (10)	1–1	Maltby Main (9)	52
replay	Maltby Main (9)	1–0	Cheadle Town (10)	92
39	Parkgate (9)	2–3	Runcorn Town (9)	94
40	AFC Emley (10)	0–2	Chadderton (10)	152
41	Staveley Miners Welfare (9)	2–1	Hall Road Rangers (9)	102
42	Nostell Miners Welfare (9)	0–1	Winsford United (9)	54
43	Barton Town Old Boys (9)	2–0	Barnoldswick Town (9)	80
44	Winterton Rangers (9)	0–3	Bacup Borough (9)	49
45	Shepshed Dynamo (9)	0–3	Heanor Town (9)	162
46	Long Eaton United (9)	0–1	Dunkirk (9)	150
47	Blackstones (9)	5–1	Barrow Town (10)	71
48	Spalding United (9)	1–2	Blaby & Whetstone Athletic (10)	48
49	Arnold Town (9)	0–2	Holbeach United (9)	105
50	Shirebrook Town (10)	0–1	Kirby Muxloe (9)	82
51	Boston Town (9)	0–2	Quorn (9)	106
52	Glossop North End (9)	0–0	Louth Town (10)	192
replay	Louth Town (10)	1–2 (a.e.t.)	Glossop North End (9)	123
53	Retford United (9)	2–1	Bardon Hill (10)	100
54	Oadby Town (10)	3–1	Anstey Nomads (10)	175
55	Holbrook Sports (10)	3–1	Deeping Rangers (9)	70
56	Thurnby Nirvana (10)	4–2	Lincoln Moorlands Railway (9)	47
57	St. Andrews (10)	1–2	Borrowash Victoria (10)	86
58	Sleaford Town (9)	2–0	Holwell Sports (10)	113
59	Teversal (10)	1–2	Loughborough University (9)	74
60	Causeway United (9)	1–1	Continental Star (9)	94
replay	Continental Star (9)	3–0	Causeway United (9)	71
61	Norton United (9)	2–2	Alvechurch (9)	94
replay	Alvechurch (9)	1–2	Norton United (9)	80
62	Highgate United (9)	1–1	Wellington (10)	53
replay	Wellington (10)	3–3 (7–6 p)	Highgate United (9)	64
63	Coleshill Town (9)	1–1	AFC Wulfrunians (10)	53
replay	AFC Wulfrunians (10)	3–2 (a.e.t.)	Coleshill Town (9)	
64	Bloxwich United (10)	2–3	Studley (9)	51
65	Brocton (10)	2–2	Bewdley Town (10)	71
replay	Bewdley Town (10)	1–0	Brocton (10)	51
66	Dudley Sports (10)	2–2	Heath Hayes (9)	62
replay	Heath Hayes (9)	2–1 (a.e.t.)	Dudley Sports (10)	85
67	Boldmere St. Michaels (9)	1–3	Bridgnorth Town (9)	53
68	Pilkington XXX (10)	5–4	Atherstone Town (10)	95
69	Stone Dominoes (9)	0–3	Rocester (9)	70
70	Dudley Town (10)	4–1	Southam United (10)	77
71	Eccleshall (10)	0–1	Stourport Swifts (9)	68
72	Lye Town (10)	2–2	Bartley Green (10)	145
replay	Bartley Green (10)	1–2	Lye Town (10)	
73	Cradley Town (10)	3–0	Shifnal Town (10)	56
74	Tipton Town (9)	0–1	Wolverhampton Casuals (10)	84
75	Ellesmere Rangers (9)	0–4	Coventry Sphinx (9)	51
76	Gornal Athletic (9)	4–0	Malvern Town (10)	60
77	Earlswood Town (10)	3–3	Nuneaton Griff (10)	50
replay	Nuneaton Griff (10)	3–1	Earlswood Town (10)	71
78	Shawbury United (10)	2–4	Westfields (9)	57
79	Pegasus Juniors (10)	2–1	Long Buckby (9)	74
80	Tividale (9)	5–2	Stratford Town (9)	117
81	Willenhall Town (10)	1–1	Sporting Khalsa (10)	72
replay	Sporting Khalsa (10)	3–2	Willenhall Town (10)	71
82	Godmanchester Rovers (9)	2–1	Thetford Town (9)	106
83	Irchester United (9)	0–1	Huntingdon Town (9)	67
84	Ely City (9)	7–1	Rothwell Corinthians (10)	87
85	Peterborough Northern Star (9)	5–1	Wellingborough Whitworth (10)	110
86	Dereham Town (9)	3–1	Stewarts & Lloyds Corby (9)	108
87	Rushden & Higham United (10)	1–3	Bugbrooke St. Michaels (10)	62
88	Fakenham Town (10)	0–1	St. Ives Town (9)	151
89	Thrapston Town (10)	2–0	Cogenhoe United (9)	125
90	Wellingborough Town (9)	2–1	March Town United (10)	94
91	Wisbech Town (9)	1–1	Desborough Town (9)	80
replay	Desborough Town (9)	2–5	Wisbech Town (9)	120
92	Northampton Spencer (10)	1–1	Yaxley (9)	80
replay	Yaxley (9)	3–1	Northampton Spencer (10)	71
93	Brantham Athletic (9)	1–0	Mildenhall Town (9)	53
94	Wivenhoe Town (9)	1–1	Haverhill Rovers (9)	115
replay	Haverhill Rovers (9)	2–0	Wivenhoe Town (9)	75
95	FC Clacton (9)	1–3	Halstead Town (10)	126
96	Felixstowe & Walton United (9)	3–1	Team Bury (10)	99

Tie	Home team (tier)	Score	Away team (tier)	Att.
97	Walsham-le-Willows (9)	1–3	Burnham Ramblers (9)	72
98	Barkingside (9)	1–1	Great Yarmouth Town (10)	186
replay	Great Yarmouth Town (10)	3–0	Barkingside (9)	57
99	Kirkley & Pakefield (9)	1–1	Sawbridgeworth Town (9)	70
replay	Sawbridgeworth Town (9)	3–7	Kirkley & Pakefield (9)	70
100	Stansted (9)	1–2	Norwich United (9)	53
101	Gorleston (9)	3–1	Stanway Rovers (9)	85
102	Takeley (9)	2–1	Newmarket Town (10)	151
103	London All Peoples' Sports Association (9)	3–1	Long Melford (10)	30
104	Basildon United (9)	1–0	Diss Town (9)	51
105	Debenham LC (10)	0–2	Whitton United (10)	90
106	Southend Manor (9)	1–0	Hullbridge Sports (9)	84
107	Woodbridge Town (9)	1–2	Great Wakering Rovers (9)	88
108	Bowers & Pitsea (9)	1–3	Eton Manor (9)	52
109	Ipswich Wanderers (10)	0–3	Hadleigh United (9)	97
110	AFC Dunstable (9)	4–1	Ampthill Town (9)	83
111	Hanworth Villa (9)	2–2	Bethnal Green United (9)	98
replay	Bethnal Green United (9)	1–5	Hanworth Villa (9)	115
112	Hoddesdon Town (10)	1–1	Berkhamsted (9)	57
replay	Berkhamsted (9)	2–1	Hoddesdon Town (10)	102
113	Wodson Park (10)	0–4	Colney Heath (9)	87
114	Bedfont Sports (9)	0–1	Tring Athletic (9)	65
115	Haringey Borough (9)	1–3	AFC Kempston Rovers (9)	57
116	Staines Lammas (10)	4–4	Barking (9)	42
replay	Barking (9)	0–1	Staines Lammas (10)	56
117	Wembley (9)	3–2	Langford (10)	654
118	Biggleswade United (9)	2–0	Cranfield United (10)	42
119	Broxbourne Borough V&E (9)	w/o	Dunstable Town (9)	N/A
Walkover for Dunstable Town – Broxbourne Borough V&E removed.
120	Hadley (9)	2–0	Hertford Town (9)	60
121	Hanwell Town (9)	1–3	Haringey & Waltham Development (9)	71
122	Harefield United (9)	3–0	Hillingdon Borough (9)	141
123	Crawley Green (10)	1–2	Stotfold (9)	65
124	London Colney (9)	3–0	Hatfield Town (9)	65
125	Kings Langley (10)	1–1	St. Margaretsbury (9)	72
replay	St. Margaretsbury (9)	3–2	Kings Langley (10)	60
126	Aylesbury United (9)	4–0	Enfield 1893 (9)	136
127	London Lions (10)	4–0	Clapton (9)	70
128	Sporting Bengal United (9)	1–3	Cockfosters (10)	78
129	Oxhey Jets (9)	5–2	Leverstock Green (9)	80
130	Ardley United (9)	4–2	Holyport (9)	46
131	Kidlington (9)	2–2	Shrivenham (9)	59
replay	Shrivenham (9)	6–3	Kidlington (9)	75
132	Cove (9)	2–0	Slimbridge (9)	55
133	Reading Town (9)	1–6	Newport Pagnell Town (9)	71
134	Hartley Wintney (9)	2–1	Holmer Green (9)	
135	Old Woodstock Town (10)	1–4	Wantage Town (9)	135
136	Bracknell Town (10)	2–1	Binfield (9)	374
137	Ascot United (9)	6–1	Sandhurst Town (9)	231
138	Thame United (9)	1–0	Newbury (9)	65
139	Witney Town (9)	1–1	Marlow (9)	142
replay	Marlow (9)	4–3	Witney Town (9)	131
140	Wokingham & Emmbrook (9)	0–2	Camberley Town (9)	140
141	Abingdon Town (9)	1–0	Fairford Town (10)	47
142	Flackwell Heath (9)	0–1	Windsor (9)	86
143	Erith Town (9)	2–4	Ringmer (9)	37
144	Littlehampton Town (10)	4–0	Molesey (9)	141
145	Tunbridge Wells (9)	1–4	Beckenham Town (9)	137
146	Peacehaven & Telscombe (9)	2–1	Banstead Athletic (10)	80
147	Chessington & Hook United (9)	2–2	Warlingham (10)	
replay	Warlingham (10)	2–3	Chessington & Hook United (9)	82
148	Cobham (10)	1–1	South Park (9)	125
replay	South Park (9)	3–0	Cobham (10)	
149	Pagham (9)	2–1	Sevenoaks Town (9)	
150	Arundel (9)	1–2	Epsom & Ewell (9)	79
151	Lordswood (9)	3–2	Erith & Belvedere (9)	110
152	Dorking (9)	3–4	VCD Athletic (9)	54
153	Redhill (9)	1–0	Whyteleafe (9)	140
154	Deal Town (9)	1–2	Ashford United (10)	166
155	Lingfield (9)	4–2	AFC Uckfield (9)	59
156	Hailsham Town (9)	2–4	Greenwich Borough (9)	40
157	Fisher (9)	1–1	East Preston (9)	71
replay	East Preston (9)	1–0	Fisher (9)	79
158	Mole Valley SCR (10)	1–1	Badshot Lea (9)	63
replay	Badshot Lea (9)	4–1	Mole Valley SCR (10)	60
159	Horley Town (9)	5–1	Holmesdale (9)	63
160	Lancing (9)	6–1	Selsey (9)	89
161	Egham Town (9)	4–0	Westfield (Surrey) (10)	56
162	Chichester City (9)	2–5	Crowborough Athletic (9)	53
163	Shoreham (9)	2–2	Colliers Wood United (9)	71
replay	Colliers Wood United (9)	4–1	Shoreham (9)	71
164	St. Francis Rangers (9)	0–1	Rye United (9)	110
165	Corinthian (9)	3–2	Croydon (9)	55
166	Hassocks (9)	0–1	Sidley United (9)	80
167	Raynes Park Vale (9)	8–0	Horsham YMCA (9)	79
168	Bitton (9)	3–1	Bristol Manor Farm (9)	97
169	Bemerton Heath Harlequins (9)	1–2	Hamworthy United (9)	52
170	Winterbourne United (9)	1–2	Moneyfields (9)	55
171	Hallen (9)	4–0	Fawley (9)	58
172	Farnham Town (9)	0–3	Alresford Town (9)	60
173	Highworth Town (9)	3–1	Corsham Town (10)	72
174	GE Hamble (9)	2–0	Whitchurch United (10)	87
175	Almondsbury UWE (10)	1–1	Petersfield Town (10)	43
replay	Petersfield Town (10)	2–3 (a.e.t.)	Almondsbury UWE (10)	63
176	East Cowes Victoria Athletic (10)	3–2	Verwood Town (9)	137
177	Downton (9)	4–1	Ash United (9)	56
178	Hayling United (9)	0–3	Fareham Town (9)	95
179	Wootton Bassett Town (10)	4–2	Calne Town (10)	248
180	Horndean (9)	2–0	Brockenhurst (10)	40
181	Fleet Spurs (10)	2–3	Totton & Eling (9)	60
182	Alton Town (9)	3–0	Bradford Town (10)	66
183	Ringwood Town (10)	1–5	Cadbury Heath (9)	61
184	Longwell Green Sports (9)	0–0	Melksham Town (9)	59
replay	Melksham Town (9)	3–1	Longwell Green Sports (9)	115
185	Christchurch (9)	5–0	Cowes Sports (10)	91
186	Romsey Town (9)	4–0	Lymington Town (9)	50
187	New Milton Town (9)	0–2	Newport (IW) (9)	40
188	Blackfield & Langley (9)	6–1	AFC Portchester (9)	40
189	Bournemouth (9)	0–1	Pewsey Vale (10)	57
190	Plymouth Parkway (10)	3–1	Welton Rovers (10)	104
191	Gillingham Town (9)	5–0	Tavistock (10)	124
192	Bodmin Town (10)	3–1	Brislington (9)	92
193	Bishop Sutton (9)	5–2	Radstock Town (9)	51
194	Street (9)	1–3	Hengrove Athletic (10)	59
195	Chard Town (10)	1–0	Ilfracombe Town (9)	102
196	Wells City (9)	3–2	Barnstaple Town (9)	65
197	Larkhall Athletic (9)	2–1	Willand Rovers (9)	75
198	Odd Down (9)	3–1	Saltash United (10)	61
199	Buckland Athletic (9)	2–1	Bridport (9)	144
200	Sherborne Town (10)	3–1	Elmore (10)	97

== Preliminary round ==
Preliminary round fixtures were played on the weekend of 25 August 2012. A total of 332 teams took part in this stage of the competition, including the 200 winners from the Extra preliminary round and 132 entering at this stage from the six leagues at Level 8 of English football. The round featured 49 teams from Level 10 still in the competition, being the lowest ranked teams in this round. The draw was as follows: The draw is as follows:

Tie	Home team (tier)	Score	Away team (tier)	Att.
1	Harrogate Railway Athletic (8)	1–1	South Shields (9)	72
replay	South Shields (9)	1–0	Harrogate Railway Athletic (8)	83
2	Birtley Town (10)	1–4	West Auckland Town (9)	135
3	Jarrow Roofing Boldon CA (10)	2–3	Farsley (8)	39
4	Shildon (9)	1–1	Guisborough Town (9)	120
replay	Guisborough Town (9)	0–6	Shildon (9)	140
5	Bishop Auckland (9)	7–1	Esh Winning (10)	94
6	Ossett Town (8)	1–0	Goole (8)	113
7	Garforth Town (8)	1–0	Wakefield (8)	71
8	Tadcaster Albion (9)	3–0	Norton & Stockton Ancients (9)	96
9	Brighouse Town (9)	1–2	Eccleshill United (10)	49
10	Hebburn Town (9)	1–3	Ossett Albion (8)	109
11	Celtic Nation (9)	2–1	Dunston UTS (9)	102
Walkover for Dunston UTS - Celtic Nation removed from competition for fielding an ineligible player.
12	Crook Town (10)	4–4	Holker Old Boys (10)	98
replay	Holker Old Boys (10)	3–1	Crook Town (10)	140
13	Marske United (9)	1–4	Ashington (9)	189
14	Spennymoor Town (9)	3–0	West Allotment Celtic (10)	201
15	Whitley Bay (9)	0–3	Bedlington Terriers (9)	329
16	Durham City (9)	2–1	Billingham Town (9)	100
17	Staveley Miners Welfare (9)	3–3	Bamber Bridge (8)	121
replay	Bamber Bridge (8)	5–2	Staveley Miners Welfare (9)	132
18	Chadderton (10)	0–1	Maltby Main (9)	37
19	Ashton Athletic (9)	2–2	Lancaster City (8)	79
replay	Lancaster City (8)	4–1	Ashton Athletic (9)	134
20	Padiham (9)	0–0	Burscough (8)	170
replay	Burscough (8)	2–1 (a.e.t.)	Padiham (9)	139
21	Mossley (8)	0–3	Bootle (9)	132
22	Maine Road (9)	2–1	Bacup Borough (9)	68
23	Barton Town Old Boys (9)	1–2	Cammell Laird (8)	94
24	Atherton Collieries (10)	2–1	Congleton Town (9)	81
25	Ramsbottom United (8)	3–0	Brigg Town (8)	203
26	Winsford United (9)	0–2	Trafford (8)	116
27	AFC Liverpool (9)	0–1	Prescot Cables (8)	361
28	Irlam (10)	1–2	Runcorn Town (9)	75
29	Atherton LR (10)	0–3	Warrington Town (8)	58
30	Formby (10)	1–3	Skelmersdale United (8)	141
31	Northwich Victoria (8)	0–0	Curzon Ashton (8)	156
replay	Curzon Ashton (8)	2–2 (4–2 p)	Northwich Victoria (8)	175
32	Sheffield (8)	1–2	Abbey Hey (10)	198
33	Clitheroe (8)	2–2	Radcliffe Borough (8)	160
replay	Radcliffe Borough (8)	0–1	Clitheroe (8)	117
34	Salford City (8)	5–1	Hemsworth Miners Welfare (9)	102
35	Loughborough Dynamo (8)	3–0	Glossop North End (9)	110
36	Lincoln United (8)	1–2	Thurnby Nirvana (10)	72
37	New Mills (8)	2–2	Mickleover Sports (8)	117
replay	Mickleover Sports (8)	1–1 (5–6 p)	New Mills (8)	124
38	Holbrook Sports (10)	1–6	Belper Town (8)	204
39	Coalville Town (8)	5–3	Loughborough University (9)	140
40	Stamford (8)	1–0	Borrowash Victoria (10)	110
41	Kirby Muxloe (9)	0–2	Holbeach United (9)	60
42	Blaby & Whetstone Athletic (10)	2–1	Heanor Town (9)	88
43	Carlton Town (8)	3–2	Oadby Town (10)	81
44	Hucknall Town (8)	0–1	Retford United (9)	173
45	Sleaford Town (9)	1–2	Rainworth MW (8)	97
46	Blackstones (9)	1–3	Gresley (8)	72
47	Quorn (9)	2–1	Dunkirk (9)	74
48	Chasetown (8)	2–1	Rocester (9)	235
49	Cradley Town (10)	4–4	Norton United (9)	27
replay	Norton United (9)	5–0	Cradley Town (10)	66
50	Studley (9)	1–4	Rugby Town (8)	113
51	Halesowen Town (8)	1–2	Dudley Town (10)	295
52	Gornal Athletic (9)	6–0	Coventry Sphinx (9)	60
53	Leek Town (8)	2–1	Evesham United (8)	177
54	Market Drayton Town (8)	2–1	Newcastle Town (8)	92
55	Heath Hayes (9)	3–4	Tividale (9)	70
56	Sporting Khalsa (10)	1–1	Nuneaton Griff (10)	50
replay	Nuneaton Griff (10)	5–1	Sporting Khalsa (10)	106
57	AFC Wulfrunians (10)	1–0	Kidsgrove Athletic (8)	90
58	Stourport Swifts (9)	1–1	Continental Star (9)	67
replay	Continental Star (9)	1–3	Stourport Swifts (9)	62
59	Wellington (10)	3–5	Bewdley Town (10)	59
60	Lye Town (10)	0–1	Bridgnorth Town (9)	128
61	Westfields (9)	2–1	Romulus (8)	82
62	Sutton Coldfield Town (8)	2–1	Pegasus Juniors (10)	70
63	Wolverhampton Casuals (10)	2–0	Pilkington XXX (10)	65
64	Godmanchester Rovers (9)	3–4	Daventry Town (8)	90
65	Peterborough Northern Star (9)	3–1	Thrapston Town (10)	72
66	Bugbrooke St Michaels (10)	2–2	Ely City (9)	47
replay	Ely City (9)	1–3	Bugbrooke St Michaels (10)	107
67	Huntingdon Town (9)	3–2	St Ives Town (9)	301
68	Dereham Town (9)	3–0	Woodford United (8)	102
Original match abandoned after 23 minutes due to waterlogged pitch. Score was at 2–0.
69	Wisbech Town (9)	3–0	Yaxley (9)	286
70	Wellingborough Town (9)	1–3	King's Lynn Town (8)	220
71	Soham Town Rangers (8)	5–1	Burnham Ramblers (9)	117
72	Great Yarmouth Town (10)	1–8	Witham Town (8)	66
73	Grays Athletic (8)	1–0	Takeley (9)	145
74	Tilbury (8)	5–1	Brantham Athletic (9)	69
75	AFC Sudbury (8)	5–0	Ilford (8)	181
76	Kirkley & Pakefield (9)	0–2	Southend Manor (9)	65
77	Harlow Town (8)	1–2	Hadleigh United (9)	131
78	Halstead Town (10)	0–6	Brentwood Town (8)	
79	Needham Market (8)	6–2	Gorleston (9)	213
80	Eton Manor (9)	0–2	Norwich United (9)	39
81	Felixstowe & Walton United (9)	1–1	Heybridge Swifts (8)	82
replay	Heybridge Swifts (8)	4–0	Felixstowe & Walton United (9)	117
82	Whitton United (10)	0–3	Aveley (8)	47

Tie	Home team (tier)	Score	Away team (tier)	Att.
83	Basildon United (9)	1–0	Haverhill Rovers (9)	48
84	Maldon & Tiptree (8)	9–1	London APSA (9)	34
85	Wroxham (8)	2–0	Great Wakering Rovers (9)	103
86	St Margaretsbury (9)	0–0	Leighton Town (8)	53
replay	Leighton Town (8)	2–3	St Margaretsbury (9)	104
87	London Colney (9)	1–2	Harefield United (9)	57
88	Haringey & Waltham Development (9)	1–2	Waltham Abbey (8)	24
89	Biggleswade United (9)	0–1	Ware (8)	48
90	Ashford Town (Middx) (8)	2–2	Tring Athletic (9)	75
replay	Tring Athletic (9)	0–2	Ashford Town (Middx) (8)	117
91	AFC Kempston Rovers (9)	2–0	Cockfosters (10)	65
92	London Lions (10)	3–1	Oxhey Jets (9)	50
93	Berkhamsted (9)	3–1	Hadley (9)	84
94	Cheshunt (8)	2–2	Potters Bar Town (8)	123
replay	Potters Bar Town (8)	3–1	Cheshunt (8)	172
95	Aylesbury United (9)	2–5	Northwood (8)	118
96	Hanworth Villa (9)	1–2	Royston Town (8)	86
97	Colney Heath (9)	1–1	Stotfold (9)	57
replay	Stotfold (9)	3–7	Colney Heath (9)	60
98	Staines Lammas (10)	0–2	Barton Rovers (8)	82
99	AFC Dunstable (9)	5–0	Redbridge (8)	42
100	Biggleswade Town (8)	3–0	AFC Hayes (8)	99
101	Uxbridge (8)	2–2	Wembley (9)	754
replay	Wembley (9)	0–5	Uxbridge (8)	317
102	Romford (8)	1–4	Waltham Forest (8)	110
103	North Greenford United (8)	2–4	Dunstable Town (9)	56
104	Bishop's Cleeve (8)	2–1	Ascot United (9)	88
Original match abandoned after 81 minutes due to waterlogged pitch. Score was at 2–2.
105	Cinderford Town (8)	5–0	Abingdon Town (9)	96
106	Didcot Town (8)	2–1	Abingdon United (8)	142
107	Camberley Town (9)	0–5	Chalfont St Peter (8)	65
108	Hungerford Town (8)	5–2	Beaconsfield SYCOB (8)	55
109	Aylesbury (8)	0–2	Windsor (9)	150
110	Wantage Town (9)	4–1	Hartley Wintney (9)	46
111	Newport Pagnell Town (9)	6–2	Ardley United (9)	140
112	Fleet Town (8)	0–2	Marlow (9)	76
113	North Leigh (8)	6–0	Thame United (9)	75
114	Cirencester Town (8)	0–1	Merthyr Town (8)	108
115	Cove (9)	2–5	Thatcham Town (8)	54
116	Bracknell Town (10)	2–0	Shrivenham (9)	136
117	Lordswood (9)	0–0	Pagham (9)	62
replay	Pagham (9)	1–1 (4–2 p)	Lordswood (9)	82
118	Chertsey Town (8)	1–4	Beckenham Town (9)	112
119	Horley Town (9)	1–1	Leatherhead (8)	104
replay	Leatherhead (8)	3–0	Horley Town (9)	141
120	Lancing (9)	0–1	South Park (9)	99
121	Epsom & Ewell (9)	2–1	Three Bridges (8)	120
122	Badshot Lea (9)	2–1	Egham Town (9)	58
123	Chipstead (8)	5–2	Crowborough Athletic (9)	63
124	Sittingbourne (8)	2–1	Burnham (8)	112
125	Faversham Town (8)	2–1	Ringmer (9)	110
126	Chatham Town (8)	2–1	Peacehaven & Telscombe (9)	113
127	Crawley Down Gatwick (8)	1–3	Tooting & Mitcham United (8)	153
128	Slough Town (8)	4–2	Corinthian (9)	154
129	Horsham (8)	2–2	Raynes Park Vale (9)	186
replay	Raynes Park Vale (9)	1–3	Horsham (8)	138
130	Merstham (8)	1–5	Walton & Hersham (8)	95
131	VCD Athletic (9)	2–1	Whitstable Town (8)	75
132	Burgess Hill Town (8)	0–3	Littlehampton Town (10)	241
133	Redhill (9)	3–0	Corinthian Casuals (8)	121
134	Godalming Town (8)	5–2	Ramsgate (8)	142
135	Herne Bay (8)	1–3	Folkestone Invicta (8)	314
136	Dulwich Hamlet (8)	1–0	Hythe Town (8)	210
137	Maidstone United (8)	4–1	Colliers Wood United (9)	938
138	Guildford City (8)	5–3	East Preston (9)	86
139	Eastbourne Town (8)	2–0	Chessington & Hook United (9)	110
140	Walton Casuals (8)	1–2	Thamesmead Town (8)	53
Original match abandoned after 45 minutes due to waterlogged pitch. Score was at 0–2.
141	Ashford United (10)	1–3	Lingfield (9)	235
142	Worthing (8)	5–1	Rye United (9)	217
143	Greenwich Borough (9)	2–2	Sidley United (9)	48
replay	Sidley United (9)	0–1	Greenwich Borough (9)	74
144	Christchurch (9)	2–1	Alresford Town (9)	78
145	Highworth Town (9)	1–0	Shortwood United (8)	102
146	Blackfield & Langley (9)	1–0	Downton (9)	77
147	Mangotsfield United (8)	2–0	Bitton (9)	175
148	Yate Town (8)	5–0	Poole Town (8)	128
149	GE Hamble (9)	0–1	Totton & Eling (9)	59
150	Pewsey Vale (10)	2–3	Melksham Town (9)	98
151	Moneyfields (9)	0–1	Newport (IW) (9)	72
152	Sholing (8)	4–0	East Cowes Victoria Athletic (10)	96
153	Cadbury Heath (9)	2–3	Almondsbury UWE (10)	79
154	Hallen (9)	1–4	Swindon Supermarine (8)	70
155	Horndean (9)	2–0	Romsey Town (9)	53
156	Wootton Bassett Town (10)	1–0	Hamworthy United (9)	99
157	Wimborne Town (8)	0–1	Fareham Town (9)	190
158	Winchester City (8)	3–0	Alton Town (9)	80
159	Gillingham Town (9)	3–3	Bishop Sutton (9)	107
replay	Bishop Sutton (9)	2–3	Gillingham Town (9)	85
160	Wells City (9)	0–4	Bodmin Town (10)	85
161	Clevedon Town (8)	2–0	Tiverton Town (8)	96
162	Buckland Athletic (9)	5–0	Hengrove Athletic (10)	146
163	Sherborne Town (10)	2–0	Odd Down (9)	78
164	Larkhall Athletic (9)	3–2	Bridgwater Town (8)	90
165	Paulton Rovers (8)	1–1	Taunton Town (8)	123
replay	Taunton Town (8)	3–2	Paulton Rovers (8)	154
166	Chard Town (10)	1–4	Plymouth Parkway (10)	91

== First qualifying round ==
The first qualifying round fixtures were played on the weekend of 8 September 2012, with replays being played the following mid-week. A total of 232 clubs took part in this stage of the competition, including the 166 winners from the Preliminary round and 66 entering at this stage from the top division of the three leagues at Level 7 of English football. The round featured twenty clubs from Level 10 still in the competition, being the lowest ranked clubs in this round. The draw is as follows:

Clevedon Town's Scott Murray won the Budweiser Player of the Round with 75% of the votes.

The results were as follows:

1. Scott Murray, Clevedon Town
2. Craig Hammond, Cambridge City
3. Paul Booth, Maidstone United
4. Tony Evans, Curzon Ashton
5. Andy Teague, Chorley.

Tie	Home team (tier)	Score	Away team (tier)	Att.
1	Spennymoor Town (9)	2–0	South Shields (9)	268
2	Tadcaster Albion (9)	3–0	Holker Old Boys (10)	111
3	Durham City (9)	1–3	Shildon (9)	214
4	Farsley (8)	1–1	Ossett Albion (8)	196
replay	Ossett Albion (8)	1–0	Farsley (8)	146
5	Ossett Town (8)	1–1	Whitby Town (7)	75
replay	Whitby Town (7)	1–0	Ossett Town (8)	179
6	Bedlington Terriers (9)	0–1	Bishop Auckland (9)	206
7	Dunston UTS (9)	3–3	Kendal Town (7)	212
replay	Kendal Town (7)	4–2 (a.e.t.)	Dunston UTS (9)	159
8	Ashington (9)	2–3	West Auckland Town (9)	277
9	Eccleshill United (10)	0–2	North Ferriby United (7)	99
10	Blyth Spartans (7)	1–0	Garforth Town (8)	401
11	Abbey Hey (10)	2–1	Atherton Collieries (10)	72
12	Warrington Town (8)	1–0	Maine Road (9)	224
13	Burscough (8)	2–4	Witton Albion (7)	217
14	Worksop Town (7)	0–2	Frickley Athletic (7)	274
15	Skelmersdale United (8)	1–0	Clitheroe (8)	163
16	Lancaster City (8)	0–4	Salford City (8)	178
17	Chorley (7)	2–0	Nantwich Town (7)	633
18	Bootle (9)	1–2	Bamber Bridge (8)	206
19	Prescot Cables (8)	1–3	Ashton United (7)	167
20	Stocksbridge Park Steels (7)	0–3	Marine (7)	159
21	FC United of Manchester (7)	5–0	Cammell Laird (8)	1,024
22	Runcorn Town (9)	0–4	Trafford (8)	100
23	Curzon Ashton (8)	8–1	Maltby Main (9)	135
24	AFC Fylde (7)	3–1	Ramsbottom United (8)	302
25	Retford United (9)	1–2	New Mills (8)	125
26	Matlock Town (7)	2–2	Belper Town (8)	460
replay	Belper Town (8)	3–0	Matlock Town (7)	341
27	Holbeach United (9)	1–2	Stamford (8)	307
28	Eastwood Town (7)	1–1	Blaby & Whetstone Athletic (10)	174
replay	Blaby & Whetstone Athletic (10)	1–3	Eastwood Town (7)	254
29	Quorn (9)	1–2	Buxton (7)	165
30	Thurnby Nirvana (10)	2–2	Gresley (8)	135
replay	Gresley (8)	4–1	Thurnby Nirvana (10)	203
31	Loughborough Dynamo (8)	2–2	Grantham Town (7)	175
replay	Grantham Town (7)	3–1	Loughborough Dynamo (8)	200
32	Rainworth Miners Welfare (8)	2–2	Carlton Town (8)	124
replay	Carlton Town (8)	3–1	Rainworth Miners Welfare (8)	63
33	Coalville Town (8)	0–1	Ilkeston (7)	322
34	Dudley Town (10)	0–1	Nuneaton Griff (10)	119
35	Rugby Town (8)	1–1	Bedworth United (7)	237
replay	Bedworth United (7)	1–0 (a.e.t.)	Rugby Town (8)	215
36	Chasetown (8)	1–1	Market Drayton Town (8)	290
replay	Market Drayton Town (8)	1–2 (a.e.t.)	Chasetown (8)	120
37	Redditch United (7)	0–3	Hednesford Town (7)	276
38	Norton United (9)	2–5	Westfields (9)	51
39	Barwell (7)	3–0	AFC Wulfrunians (10)	125
40	Bridgnorth Town (9)	3–1	Rushall Olympic (7)	149
41	Leamington (7)	2–2	Stourbridge (7)	601
replay	Stourbridge (7)	1–2	Leamington (7)	440
42	Sutton Coldfield Town (8)	0–3	Gornal Athletic (9)	80
43	Stourport Swifts (9)	1–1	Stafford Rangers (7)	171
replay	Stafford Rangers (7)	2–1 (a.e.t.)	Stourport Swifts (9)	309
44	Wolverhampton Casuals (10)	1–1	Tividale (9)	112
replay	Tividale (9)	4–2	Wolverhampton Casuals (10)	101
45	Leek Town (8)	5–1	Bewdley Town (10)	251
46	Cambridge City (7)	7–0	Huntingdon Town (9)	240
47	Daventry Town (8)	1–1	King's Lynn Town (8)	180
replay	King's Lynn Town (8)	2–3 (a.e.t.)	Daventry Town (8)	387
48	St Neots Town (7)	5–0	Peterborough Northern Star (9)	342
49	Wisbech Town (9)	0–0	Kettering Town (7)	527
replay	Kettering Town (7)	3–0	Wisbech Town (9)	239
50	Bugbrooke St Michaels (10)	1–4	Dereham Town (9)	80
51	Tilbury (8)	0–2	Lowestoft Town (7)	134
52	Heybridge Swifts (8)	4–1	AFC Sudbury (8)	203
53	Soham Town Rangers (8)	0–2	Maldon & Tiptree (8)	132
54	Basildon United (9)	0–3	Thurrock (7)	50
55	Bury Town (7)	3–0	Canvey Island (7)	375
56	Wroxham (8)	0–5	Brentwood Town (8)	178
57	Leiston (7)	5–1	Southend Manor (9)	153
58	Concord Rangers (7)	1–0	Needham Market (8)	132

Tie	Home team (tier)	Score	Away team (tier)	Att.
59	East Thurrock United (7)	2–0	Witham Town (8)	155
60	Grays Athletic (8)	2–1	Norwich United (9)	157
61	Aveley (8)	6–1	Hadleigh United (9)	74
62	Dunstable Town (9)	2–2	Ashford Town (Middx) (8)	82
replay	Ashford Town (Middx) (8)	3–0 (a.e.t.)	Dunstable Town (9)	116
63	AFC Kempston Rovers (9)	0–3	Hampton & Richmond Borough (7)	130
64	Chesham United (7)	0–1	Northwood (8)	252
65	Enfield Town (7)	2–0	St Margaretsbury (9)	346
66	Harrow Borough (7)	1–3	St Albans City (7)	219
67	London Lions (10)	2–4	AFC Dunstable (9)	120
68	Hemel Hempstead Town (7)	2–5	Waltham Forest (8)	248
69	Waltham Abbey (8)	1–0	Bedford Town (7)	149
70	Hendon (7)	1–1	Potters Bar Town (8)	119
replay	Potters Bar Town (8)	0–3	Hendon (7)	139
71	Uxbridge (8)	3–4	Berkhamsted (9)	190
72	Ware (8)	0–5	Hitchin Town (7)	181
73	Barton Rovers (8)	0–1	Arlesey Town (7)	152
74	Colney Heath (9)	1–2	Harefield United (9)	70
75	Wingate & Finchley (7)	1–1	Royston Town (8)	160
replay	Royston Town (8)	2–3 (a.e.t.)	Wingate & Finchley (7)	155
76	Wealdstone (7)	2–0	Biggleswade Town (8)	302
77	Bishop's Cleeve (8)	6–0	Bracknell Town (10)	105
78	Chalfont St Peter (8)	3–2	Newport Pagnell Town (9)	86
79	Windsor (9)	0–1	Didcot Town (8)	232
80	Cinderford Town (8)	1–1	Merthyr Town (8)	221
replay	Merthyr Town (8)	3–0	Cinderford Town (8)	306
81	Hungerford Town (8)	1–1	Banbury United (7)	104
replay	Banbury United (7)	0–2	Hungerford Town (8)	145
82	North Leigh (8)	6–1	Wantage Town (9)	92
83	Marlow (9)	1–3	Thatcham Town (8)	121
84	Littlehampton Town (10)	0–1	Eastbourne Town (8)	174
85	VCD Athletic (9)	0–1	Horsham (8)	126
86	Slough Town (8)	4–1	Lingfield (9)	194
87	Faversham Town (8)	2–2	Margate (7)	409
replay	Margate (7)	3–0	Faversham Town (8)	248
88	Bognor Regis Town (7)	4–0	Epsom & Ewell (9)	368
89	Badshot Lea (9)	3–2	Folkestone Invicta (8)	98
90	Godalming Town (8)	2–2	Dulwich Hamlet (8)	311
replay	Dulwich Hamlet (8)	2–2 (3–1 p)	Godalming Town (8)	157
91	Leatherhead (8)	3–1	Tooting & Mitcham United (8)	183
92	Greenwich Borough (9)	0–1	Cray Wanderers (7)	141
93	Redhill (9)	1–3	Lewes (7)	200
94	Beckenham Town (9)	1–7	Metropolitan Police (7)	48
95	South Park (9)	1–1	Walton & Hersham (8)	103
replay	Walton & Hersham (8)	0–1	South Park (9)	90
96	Chipstead (8)	0–4	Maidstone United (8)	189
97	Pagham (9)	0–0	Carshalton Athletic (7)	140
replay	Carshalton Athletic (7)	3–0	Pagham (9)	151
98	Guildford City (8)	0–3	Kingstonian (7)	295
99	Whitehawk (7)	5–0	Sittingbourne (8)	136
100	Thamesmead Town (8)	2–0	Worthing (8)	58
101	Hastings United (7)	3–1	Chatham Town (8)	338
102	Fareham Town (9)	2–1	Christchurch (9)	130
103	Newport (IW) (9)	2–0	Horndean (9)	149
104	Chippenham Town (7)	3–1	Mangotsfield United (8)	303
105	Blackfield & Langley (9)	4–0	Almondsbury UWE (10)	45
106	Totton & Eling (9)	2–2	Weymouth (7)	430
replay	Weymouth (7)	3–0	Totton & Eling (9)	356
107	Winchester City (8)	1–2	Yate Town (8)	71
108	Swindon Supermarine (8)	0–6	AFC Totton (7)	131
109	Wootton Bassett Town (10)	3–1	Highworth Town (9)	299
110	Sholing (8)	4–0	Melksham Town (9)	104
111	Bashley (7)	1–1	Gosport Borough (7)	205
replay	Gosport Borough (7)	3–2 (a.e.t.)	Bashley (7)	182
112	Plymouth Parkway (10)	1–1	Buckland Athletic (9)	202
replay	Buckland Athletic (9)	5–1	Plymouth Parkway (10)	209
113	Gillingham Town (9)	0–0	Taunton Town (8)	219
replay	Taunton Town (8)	1–3	Gillingham Town (9)	222
114	Bideford (7)	2–2	Bodmin Town (10)	220
replay	Bodmin Town (10)	2–3 (a.e.t.)	Bideford (7)	189
115	Larkhall Athletic (9)	0–0	Frome Town (7)	185
replay	Frome Town (7)	4–0	Larkhall Athletic (9)	204
116	Clevedon Town (8)	5–0	Sherborne Town (10)	157

== Second qualifying round ==
The second qualifying round fixtures were played on the weekend of 22 September 2012. A total of 160 clubs took part in this stage of the competition, including the 116 winners from the First qualifying round and 44 Level 6 clubs, from Conference North and Conference South, entering at this stage. The round featured Abbey Hey, Nuneaton Griff and Wootton Bassett Town from Level 10 still in the competition, being the lowest ranked clubs in this round. The second qualifying round draw is as follows:

FC United of Manchester's Nicky Platt won the Budweiser Player of the Round.

The results were as follows:

1. Nicky Platt, FC United of Manchester
2. Sean Shields, St Albans City
3. Tom Winters, Brackley Town
4. Jonte Smith, Metropolitan Police
5. Callum Ward, Tadcaster Albion.

Tie	Home team (tier)	Score	Away team (tier)	Att.
1	Bishop Auckland (9)	1–2	AFC Fylde (7)	298
2	FC Halifax Town (6)	6–0	Abbey Hey (10)	936
3	Curzon Ashton (8)	1–3	Bradford Park Avenue (6)	237
4	Blyth Spartans (7)	1–1	Workington (6)	502
replay	Workington (6)	1–0	Blyth Spartans (7)	219
5	Shildon (9)	0–3	Altrincham (6)	280
6	Ashton United (7)	0–2	Marine (7)	193
7	Salford City (8)	2–3	FC United of Manchester (7)	1,298
8	Trafford (8)	5–3	Spennymoor Town (9)	311
9	Stalybridge Celtic (6)	1–0	Vauxhall Motors (6)	420
10	Bamber Bridge (8)	0–1	Guiseley (6)	249
11	Kendal Town (7)	4–2	Witton Albion (7)	277
12	Colwyn Bay (6)	3–2	Warrington Town (8)	249
13	Gainsborough Trinity (6)	1–1	Chester (6)	756
replay	Chester (6)	2–1 (a.e.t.)	Gainsborough Trinity (6)	1,492
14	Tadcaster Albion (9)	4–1	Skelmersdale United (8)	183
15	Whitby Town (7)	4–3	Droylsden (6)	202
16	North Ferriby United (7)	1–2	Ossett Albion (8)	236
17	West Auckland Town (9)	2–2	Harrogate Town (6)	194
replay	Harrogate Town (6)	5–1	West Auckland (9)	171
18	Chorley (7)	1–3	Frickley Athletic (7)	642
19	Gornal Athletic (9)	0–4	Worcester City (6)	400
20	Boston United (6)	1–0	Kettering Town (7)	901
21	Solihull Moors (6)	1–1	Westfields (9)	124
replay	Westfields (9)	1–2	Solihull Moors (6)	153
22	Hinckley United (6)	5–3	Tividale (9)	239
23	Cambridge City (7)	3–1	Grantham Town (7)	379
24	Eastwood Town (7)	3–5	Histon (6)	159
25	Nuneaton Griff (10)	2–3	Hednesford Town (7)	298
26	Gresley (8)	3–2	Stafford Rangers (7)	414
27	Carlton Town (8)	4–3	New Mills (8)	78
28	Brackley Town (6)	4–0	Daventry Town (8)	332
29	Dereham Town (9)	2–1	Chasetown (8)	243
30	Ilkeston (7)	2–2	Belper Town (8)	519
replay	Belper Town (8)	1–5	Ilkeston (7)	320
31	Stamford (8)	1–3	Buxton (7)	201
32	Leek Town (8)	3–0	Bridgnorth Town (9)	356
33	Barwell (7)	3–2	Bedworth United (7)	304
34	Corby Town (6)	3–2	Leamington (7)	516
35	Northwood (8)	1–1	AFC Dunstable (9)	111
replay	AFC Dunstable (9)	0–3	Northwood (8)	109
36	Wealdstone (7)	1–2	Lowestoft Town (7)	413
37	Ashford Town (Middx) (8)	2–6	St Albans City (7)	176
38	Hayes & Yeading United (6)	3–2	Heybridge Swifts (8)	139
39	Carshalton Athletic (7)	0–1	Chalfont St Peter (8)	185
40	Hendon (7)	3–0	Lewes (7)	166

Tie	Home team (tier)	Score	Away team (tier)	Att.
41	St Neots Town (7)	1–2	Boreham Wood (6)	432
42	Chelmsford City (6)	2–1	Leatherhead (8)	519
43	Dover Athletic (6)	2–1	Tonbridge Angels (6)	625
44	Brentwood Town (8)	1–1	Maldon & Tiptree (8)	136
replay	Maldon & Tiptree (8)	1–1 (8–9 p)	Brentwood Town (8)	106
45	Badshot Lea (9)	4–2	Leiston (7)	98
46	Aveley (8)	1–4	Margate (7)	131
47	Waltham Abbey (8)	2–4	Eastbourne Borough (6)	223
48	Billericay Town (6)	3–1	AFC Hornchurch (6)	509
49	Concord Rangers (7)	1–1	Welling United (6)	235
replay	Welling United (6)	2–1	Concord Rangers (7)	287
50	Enfield Town (7)	1–4	Bishop's Stortford (6)	460
51	Cray Wanderers (7)	3–1	Thamesmead Town (8)	92
52	Waltham Forest (8)	0–1	Hampton & Richmond Borough (7)	89
53	Whitehawk (7)	1–1	Hitchin Town (7)	144
replay	Hitchin Town (7)	5–0	Whitehawk (7)	185
54	South Park (9)	0–0	Harefield United (9)	171
replay	Harefield United (9)	1–4	South Park (9)	135
55	Arlesey Town (7)	1–0	Dulwich Hamlet (8)	156
56	Staines Town (6)	2–3	Hastings United (7)	289
57	Berkhamsted (9)	0–3	Metropolitan Police (7)	204
58	Slough Town (8)	5–1	Eastbourne Town (8)	182
59	Bury Town (7)	2–1	Wingate & Finchley (7)	366
60	Horsham (8)	1–2	Thurrock (7)	221
61	Sutton United (6)	0–1	Bromley (6)	511
62	Grays Athletic (8)	0–5	Maidstone United (8)	345
63	Kingstonian (7)	2–3	East Thurrock United (7)	306
64	Bishop's Cleeve (8)	1–2	Chippenham Town (7)	187
65	Truro City (6)	2–3	AFC Totton (7)	424
66	Dorchester Town (6)	4–0	Wootton Bassett Town (10)	406
67	Buckland Athletic (9)	1–2	Bath City (6)	367
68	Gloucester City (6)	2–1	Thatcham Town (8)	231
69	Gillingham Town (9)	1–3	Sholing (8)	227
70	North Leigh (8)	1–0	Havant & Waterlooville (6)	194
71	Basingstoke Town (6)	3–1	Weymouth (7)	324
72	Merthyr Town (8)	0–0	Hungerford Town (8)	513
replay	Hungerford Town (8)	1–1 (4–5 p)	Merthyr Town (8)	115
73	Frome Town (7)	0–2	Weston-super-Mare (6)	256
74	Didcot Town (8)	3–1	Clevedon Town (8)	190
75	Newport (IW) (9)	0–3	Salisbury City (6)	559
76	Gosport Borough (7)	2–0	Bideford (7)	232
77	Fareham Town (9)	0–2	Blackfield & Langley (9)	224
78	Farnborough (6)	1–2	Eastleigh (6)	444
79	Maidenhead United (6)	4–2	Bognor Regis Town (7)	316
80	Yate Town (8)	2–1	Oxford City (6)	179

== Third qualifying round ==
The third qualifying round took place on the weekend of 6 October 2012. A total of 80 clubs took part, all having progressed from the second qualifying round. Five clubs from Level 9 of English football, was the lowest-ranked team to qualify for this round of the competition. The draw is as follows:

South Park's Kieran Lavery won the Budweiser Player of the Round with 33% of the votes.

The results were as follows:

1. Kieran Lavery, South Park
2. Sam Reed, Bury Town
3. Michael Barnes, AFC Fylde
4. Jamie Slabber, Chelmsford City
5. Jeanmal Prosper, Arlesey Town.

Tie	Home team (tier)	Score	Away team (tier)	Att.
1	Ilkeston (7)	4–2	Gresley (8)	621
2	Chester (6)	1–1	FC Halifax Town (6)	2,613
replay	FC Halifax Town (6)	3–1	Chester (6)	1,541
3	Hednesford Town (7)	2–2	Buxton (7)	498
replay	Buxton (7)	2–1 (a.e.t.)	Hednesford Town (7)	302
4	AFC Fylde (7)	4–1	Solihull Moors (6)	278
5	Carlton Town (8)	1–3	Bradford Park Avenue (6)	151
6	Colwyn Bay (6)	1–1	Guiseley (6)	318
replay	Guiseley (6)	3–1	Colwyn Bay (6)	360
7	Stalybridge Celtic (6)	3–1	Whitby Town (7)	372
8	Barwell (7)	1–1	Workington (6)	217
replay	Workington (6)	2–0	Barwell (7)	385
9	Hinckley United (6)	2–2	Ossett Albion (8)	270
replay	Ossett Albion (8)	1–0	Hinckley United (6)	222
10	FC United of Manchester (7)	3–1	Kendal Town (7)	1,186
11	Leek Town (8)	0–2	Altrincham (6)	962
12	Trafford (8)	1–3	Marine (7)	515
13	Harrogate Town (6)	3–2	Frickley Athletic (7)	349
14	Tadcaster Albion (9)	0–2	Boston United (6)	368
15	Hastings United (7)	2–2	Hitchin Town (7)	459
replay	Hitchin Town (7)	1–2	Hastings United (7)	289
16	Histon (6)	1–1	Corby Town (6)	330
replay	Corby Town (6)	2–1	Histon (6)	510
17	Cambridge City (7)	1–1	Billericay Town (6)	394
replay	Billericay Town (6)	2–4	Cambridge City (7)	364
18	Margate (7)	0–1	Slough Town (8)	410
19	Dereham Town (9)	1–1	Metropolitan Police (7)	328
replay	Metropolitan Police (7)	2–0	Dereham Town (9)	191

Tie	Home team (tier)	Score	Away team (tier)	Att.
20	South Park (9)	3–1	Brentwood Town (8)	255
21	Chalfont St Peter (8)	1–1	Bishop's Stortford (6)	241
replay	Bishop's Stortford (6)	3–1	Chalfont St Peter (8)	268
22	Cray Wanderers (7)	1–2	Chelmsford City (6)	350
23	Dover Athletic (6)	1–2	Bromley (6)	715
24	Northwood (8)	0–4	Boreham Wood (6)	225
25	East Thurrock United (7)	3–0	Maidstone United (8)	364
26	Bury Town (7)	4–0	Hampton & Richmond Borough (7)	405
27	St Albans City (7)	0–1	Lowestoft Town (7)	306
28	Eastbourne Borough (6)	2–2	Hendon (7)	493
replay	Hendon (7)	2–1 (a.e.t.)	Eastbourne Borough (6)	190
29	Arlesey Town (7)	4–3	Brackley Town (6)	227
30	Welling United (6)	1–1	Thurrock (7)	402
replay	Thurrock (7)	1–3	Welling United (6)	176
31	Weston-super-Mare (6)	1–1	Worcester City (6)	556
replay	Worcester City (6)	1–0	Weston-super-Mare (6)	1,013
32	Dorchester Town (6)	1–0	Basingstoke Town (6)	466
33	Yate Town (8)	2–1	North Leigh (8)	191
34	Gloucester City (6)	1–0	Eastleigh (6)	432
35	Chippenham Town (7)	3–1	Badshot Lea (9)	367
36	Didcot Town (8)	1–0	Maidenhead United (6)	301
37	AFC Totton (7)	3–2	Merthyr Town (8)	539
38	Bath City (6)	1–1	Gosport Borough (7)	586
replay	Gosport Borough (7)	3–1	Bath City (6)	342
39	Sholing (8)	1–3	Blackfield & Langley (9)	165
40	Hayes & Yeading United (6)	2–1	Salisbury City (6)	345

== Fourth qualifying round ==
The fourth qualifying round took place on the weekend of 20 October 2012. A total of 64 clubs took part, 40 having progressed from the third qualifying round and 24 clubs from Conference Premier, forming Level 5 of English football, entering at this stage. The lowest-ranked sides to qualify for this round were Level 9 clubs South Park, and Blackfield & Langley. The draw is as follows:

Luton Town's Andre Gray won the Budweiser Player of the Round with 41% of the votes.

The results were as follows:

1. Andre Gray, Luton Town
2. Jake Speight, Mansfield Town
3. Danny Hurst, Barrow
4. Ryan Bowman, Hereford
5. Lee Carey, Hastings.

Tie	Home team (tier)	Score	Away team (tier)	Att.
1	Alfreton Town (5)	2–0	Gateshead (5)	338
2	Hyde (5)	1–1	Harrogate Town (6)	393
replay	Harrogate Town (6)	1–0 (a.e.t.)	Hyde (5)	247
3	FC United of Manchester (7)	0–2	Hereford United (5)	2,212
4	Barrow (5)	2–0	Tamworth (5)	1,104
5	Guiseley (6)	2–0	Buxton (7)	847
6	Grimsby Town (5)	2–4	Kidderminster Harriers (5)	2,092
7	Bradford Park Avenue (6)	4–1	Ossett Albion (8)	477
8	Wrexham (5)	2–0	Southport (5)	1,911
9	AFC Fylde (7)	1–1	Ilkeston (7)	482
replay	Ilkeston (7)	0–1	AFC Fylde (7)	696
10	Boston United (6)	1–3	Altrincham (6)	1,200
11	Lincoln City (5)	0–0	FC Halifax Town (6)	1,940
replay	FC Halifax Town (6)	0–2	Lincoln City (5)	1,418
12	Macclesfield Town (5)	3–1	Marine (7)	1,189
13	Workington (6)	1–2	Mansfield Town (5)	701
14	Stockport County (5)	5–3	Stalybridge Celtic (6)	2,123
15	AFC Telford United (5)	2–2	Nuneaton Town (5)	1,251
replay	Nuneaton Town (5)	1–0 (a.e.t.)	AFC Telford United (5)	616
16	South Park (9)	0–3	Metropolitan Police (7)	643

Tie	Home team (tier)	Score	Away team (tier)	Att.
17	Didcot Town (8)	0–1	Arlesey Town (7)	414
18	Forest Green Rovers (5)	1–1	Dartford (5)	891
replay	Dartford (5)	1–4	Forest Green Rovers (5)	804
19	Yate Town (8)	3–3	Newport County (5)	1,190
replay	Newport County (5)	1–3 (a.e.t.)	Yate Town (8)	1,463
20	Slough Town (8)	0–0	Gosport Borough (7)	523
replay	Gosport Borough (7)	1–2	Slough Town (8)	635
21	Hastings United (7)	3–0	Blackfield & Langley (9)	800
22	Bromley (6)	1–0	Worcester City (6)	610
23	Chelmsford City (6)	2–2	East Thurrock United (7)	902
replay	East Thurrock United (7)	4–4 (3–5 p)	Chelmsford City (6)	595
24	Hayes & Yeading United (6)	2–3	Boreham Wood (6)	312
25	AFC Totton (7)	2–3	Cambridge City (7)	674
26	Welling United (6)	1–3	Bishop's Stortford (6)	544
27	Braintree Town (5)	3–2	Lowestoft Town (7)	634
28	Dorchester Town (6)	3–1	Bury Town (7)	555
29	Cambridge United (5)	0–2	Luton Town (5)	2,321
30	Gloucester City (6)	1–0	Chippenham Town (7)	675
31	Corby Town (6)	1–2	Hendon (7)	692
32	Woking (5)	0–1	Ebbsfleet United (5)	1,272

== Competition proper ==
Winners from fourth qualifying round advance to first round proper, where clubs from Level 3 and Level 4 of English football, operating in The Football League, first enter the competition. See 2012–13 FA Cup for a report of first round proper onwards.
