= 2009–10 Spartan South Midlands Football League =

The 2009–10 Spartan South Midlands Football League season is the 13th in the history of Spartan South Midlands Football League a football competition in England.

== Premier Division ==
Spartan South Midlands Football League Premier Division
- Season: 2009–10
- Champions: Aylesbury
- Promoted: Aylesbury
- Relegated: Welwyn Garden City
- Matches: 462
- Goals: 1,698 (3.68 per match)

The Premier Division featured 18 clubs which competed in the division last season, along with four new clubs:

- Dunstable Town, relegated from the Southern Football League
- Hatfield Town, promoted from Division One
- Hillingdon Borough, relegated from the Isthmian League
- Royston Town, promoted from Division One

Also, Aylesbury Vale changed name to Aylesbury.

=== League table ===
Pos	Team	Pld	W	D	L	GF	GA	GD	Pts	Promotion or relegation
1	Aylesbury	42	28	8	6	109	41	+68	92	Promoted to the Southern Football League
2	Chalfont St Peter	42	28	4	10	121	52	+69	88	
3	Tring Athletic	42	27	3	12	107	49	+58	84	
4	Royston Town	42	27	3	12	118	67	+51	84	
5	Colney Heath	42	23	7	12	87	68	+19	76	
6	Harefield United	42	23	4	15	81	67	+14	73	
7	Dunstable Town	42	22	6	14	90	58	+32	72	
8	Kingsbury London Tigers	42	21	7	14	86	67	+19	70	
9	Broxbourne Borough V&E	42	21	6	15	84	54	+30	69	
10	Leverstock Green	42	17	10	15	74	64	+10	61	
11	Oxhey Jets	42	17	7	18	83	81	+2	58	
12	Hatfield Town	42	18	4	20	69	71	−2	58	
13	Hanwell Town	42	16	9	17	84	71	+13	57	
14	St Margaretsbury	42	12	13	17	57	76	−19	49	
15	Haringey Borough	42	13	7	22	67	84	−17	46	
16	Hertford Town	42	13	7	22	53	80	−27	46	
17	Kentish Town	42	12	6	24	60	124	−64	42	
18	Hillingdon Borough	42	10	10	22	53	106	−53	40	
19	Langford	42	11	6	25	66	111	−45	39	
20	Biggleswade United	42	11	6	25	48	93	−45	39	
21	Brimsdown Rovers	42	10	8	24	50	84	−34	38	Club folded
22	Welwyn Garden City	42	9	5	28	51	130	−79	29 (Note: Welwyn Garden City deducted 3 points)	Relegated to Division One

Source: fchd
Rules for classification: 1) points; 2) goal difference; 3) number of goals scored.

== Division One ==
Spartan South Midlands Football League Division One
- Season: 2009–10
- Champions: Holmer Green
- Promoted: Holmer Green; Hadley
- Relegated: Brache Sparta
- Matches: 420
- Goals: 1,611 (3.84 per match)

Division One featured 17 clubs which competed in the division last season, along with four new clubs:

- AFC Dunstable, promoted from Division Two
- Cockfosters, relegated from the Premier Division
- Hadley, promoted from Division Two
- Holmer Green, relegated from the Premier Division

=== League table ===
Pos	Team	Pld	W	D	L	GF	GA	GD	Pts	Promotion or relegation
1	Holmer Green	40	28	9	3	95	31	+64	93	Promoted to the Premier Division
2	Hadley	40	28	6	6	90	34	+56	90	Promoted to the Premier Division
3	London Colney	40	28	5	7	107	40	+67	89	
4	Hoddesdon Town	40	23	9	8	98	46	+52	78	
5	AFC Dunstable	40	24	5	11	108	69	+39	77	
6	New Bradwell St Peter	40	22	6	12	96	70	+26	72	
7	Kings Langley	40	21	7	12	84	60	+24	70	
8	Crawley Green Sports	40	21	5	14	80	59	+21	68	
9	Bedford	40	19	8	13	90	72	+18	65	
10	Bedford Town Reserves	40	19	4	17	84	65	+19	61	
11	Cockfosters	40	17	9	14	82	75	+7	60	
12	Harpenden Town	40	15	6	19	65	73	−8	51	
13	Ampthill Town	40	15	4	21	61	85	−24	46 (Note: Ampthill Town and Tokyngton Manor deducted 3 points)	
14	Sun Postal Sports	40	12	9	19	70	84	−14	45	
15	Stony Stratford Town	40	11	12	17	67	82	−15	45	
16	Buckingham Athletic	40	12	5	23	58	78	−20	41	
17	Amersham Town	40	10	7	23	49	100	−51	37	
18	Tokyngton Manor	40	12	3	25	61	94	−33	36	Excluded from the league
19	Cranfield United	40	7	8	25	29	103	−74	29	
20	Sport London e Benfica	40	6	5	29	42	121	−79	23	
21	Brache Sparta	40	1	6	33	27	102	−75	9	Relegated to Division Two

Source: fchd
Rules for classification: 1) points; 2) goal difference; 3) number of goals scored.

== Division Two ==
Spartan South Midlands Football League Division Two
- Season: 2009–10
- Champions: Berkhamsted
- Promoted: Berkhamsted; Wodson Park
- Matches: 240
- Goals: 1,026 (4.28 per match)

Division Two featured 15 clubs that had started the previous season (including Milton Keynes Wanderers who didn't finish it) and one new club:

- Berkhamsted

=== League table ===
Pos	Team	Pld	W	D	L	GF	GA	GD	Pts	Promotion
1	Berkhamsted	30	25	3	2	121	34	+87	78	Promoted to Division One
2	Aston Clinton	30	23	2	5	100	37	+63	71	
3	Padbury United	30	23	2	5	88	33	+55	71	
4	Wodson Park	30	21	2	7	77	43	+34	65	Promoted to Division One
5	Milton Keynes Wanderers	30	14	3	13	69	52	+17	45	
6	Tring Corinthians	30	13	5	12	57	49	+8	44	
7	Pitstone & Ivinghoe United	30	12	4	14	57	55	+2	40	
8	Totternhoe	30	10	9	11	62	50	+12	39	
9	The 61	30	11	6	13	50	52	−2	39	
10	Risborough Rangers	30	10	7	13	53	52	+1	37	
11	Bucks Student Union	30	9	4	17	56	97	−41	31	
12	Caddington	30	6	8	16	53	98	−45	26	
13	Mursley United	30	7	3	20	60	94	−34	24	
14	Kent Athletic	30	5	8	17	37	83	−46	23	
15	Old Bradwell United	30	6	5	19	37	89	−52	23	
16	Bletchley Town	30	7	5	18	49	108	−59	23 (Note: Bletchley Town deducted 3 points.)	

Source: fchd
Rules for classification: 1) points; 2) goal difference; 3) number of goals scored.
