= 1903–04 Brentford F.C. season =

English football team season

Brentford
1903–04 season
- Chairman: Charlie Dorey
- Secretary Manager: Dick Molyneux (until March 1904); William Lewis (from March 1904)
- Stadium: York Road
- Southern League First Division: 13th
- FA Cup: Intermediate round
- Top goalscorer: League: Buchanan, Underwood (6); All: Buchanan, Underwood (10)
Home colours

During the 1903–04 English football season, Brentford competed in the Southern League First Division. Despite leading the division in September 1903, disruption behind the scenes and the suspension of manager Dick Molyneux for the final month of the season led to a 13th-place finish.

== Season summary ==
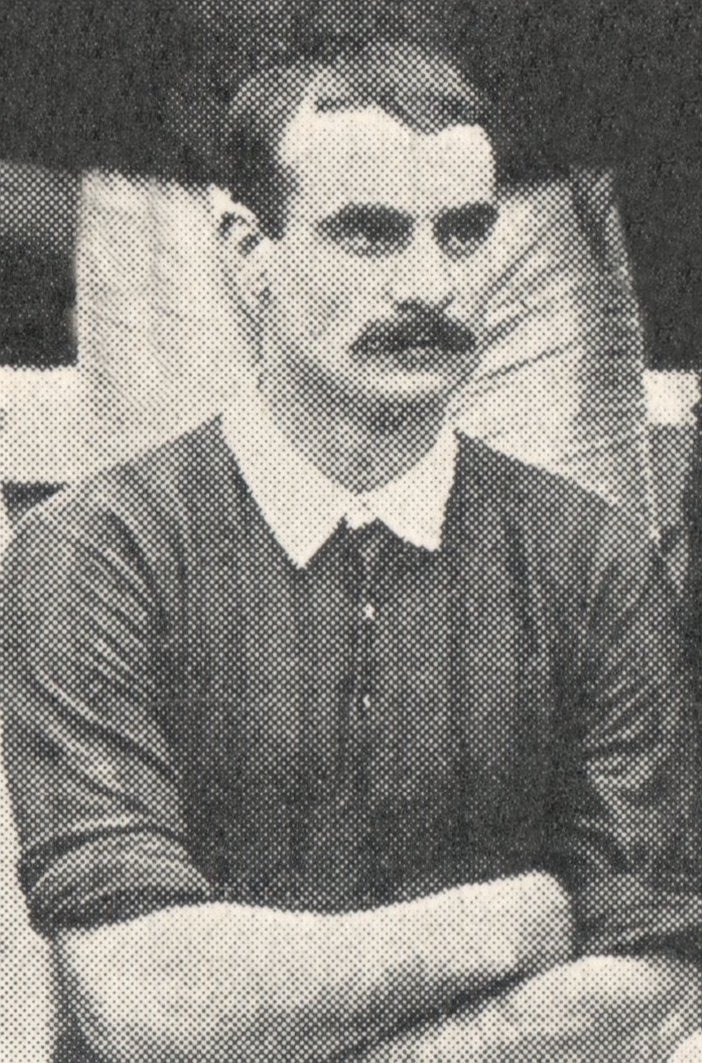
Wing half Jimmy Jay was signed from Bristol City during the 1903 off-season and would go on to make more Southern League appearances for Brentford than any other player.

Directly after the end of the dire 1902–03 season, the Brentford committee decided to act and appoint a first team manager. Dick Molyneux became the first official manager in the club's history and arrived at York Road having served as manager at Everton for 12 years, with a CV boasting one Football League First Division championship and two FA Cup runners-up medals. One of the first major changes Molyneux enacted was to request that the board raise funds to pay adequate off-season wages for the playing squad, which would put an end to the failures of previous seasons, when the board waited until almost before the beginning of the season to transfer players in, so as to cut down on off-season wages. Due to the majority of clubs conducting their transfer business shortly after the end of the season, the tactic meant that Brentford were always short on transfer options, when conducting business close to the beginning of the following season.

The board raised £330 in donations (equivalent to £34,700 in 2025) and Molyneux set about building a 16-man all-professional squad which could compete in the Southern League First Division. Of the previous season's squad, only goalkeeper Tommy Spicer, inside left Percy Turner and outside left Tosher Underwood were retained and by early June 1903, Molyneux had signed an almost entirely new XI. Brentford's colours were changed for the first time since the mid-1890s, with the old claret and blue replaced by a kit consisting of gold shirts with blue stripes, white shorts and black socks.

Dick Molyneux's team started season strongly, reaching top spot in the First Division after five matches. The demands on the small squad led Brentford to fall back into mid-table and a goalkeeping crisis suffered in early 1904 exacerbated the problem. Molyneux brought in former trialist John Bishop and paid him money to play, an illegal move as Bishop was a serving soldier with the Scots Guards and therefore an amateur player. After his third appearance, Bishop returned late to barracks, was reported to his commanding officer and then made a statement in writing about his involvement with Brentford. The statement was passed on to the FA, who fined Brentford £25 and suspended director Bill Dodge for two years and manager Molyneux for the final month of the season. With secretary William Lewis in caretaker charge, the Bees took one point from the remaining five matches of the season to finish in 13th position. The five away draws was the most by the club during its Southern League seasons.

== League table ==
Pos	Team	Pld	W	D	L	GF	GA	GR	Pts
11	Fulham	34	9	12	13	34	36	0.944	30
12	West Ham United	34	10	7	17	39	44	0.886	27
13	Brentford	34	9	9	16	34	48	0.708	27
14	Wellingborough	34	11	5	18	44	63	0.698	27
15	Northampton Town	34	10	7	17	36	60	0.600	27

Source: rsssf.com
Rules for classification: The system of using goal average to separate two teams tied on points was used until the 1976-77 season. The points system: 2 points for a win, 1 point for a draw and 0 points for losing.

== Results ==
Brentford's goal tally listed first.

=== Legend ===
Win	Draw	Loss

=== Southern League First Division ===
No.	Date	Opponent	Venue	Result	Scorer(s)
1	5 September 1903	Queens Park Rangers	A	0–1	
2	7 September 1903	Swindon Town	H	2–1	Turner, Swarbrick
3	12 September 1903	Plymouth Argyle	H	1–0	Leigh
4	14 September 1903	Tottenham Hotspur	H	0–0	
5	19 September 1903	Reading	A	1–1	Underwood
6	26 September 1903	Wellingborough	H	0–1	
7	3 October 1903	Bristol Rovers	A	1–5	Parsonage
8	10 October 1903	Brighton & Hove Albion	H	1–0	Leigh
9	17 October 1903	Portsmouth	A	1–3	Atherton
10	24 October 1903	Northampton Town	H	4–1	Buchanan, Bell (2), Durber (og)
11	7 November 1903	West Ham United	A	1–0	Underwood
12	21 November 1903	Luton Town	A	0–1	
13	5 December 1903	Kettering	A	0–1	
14	26 December 1903	Fulham	H	1–1	Leigh
15	28 December 1903	Millwall	H	1–3	Bellingham
16	2 January 1904	Queens Park Rangers	H	1–4	Buchanan
17	4 January 1904	Kettering	H	4–2	Buchanan (3), Jay
18	9 January 1904	Plymouth Argyle	A	2–2	Atherton, Davidson
19	16 January 1904	Reading	H	0–0	
20	23 January 1904	Wellingborough	A	0–2	
21	30 January 1904	Bristol Rovers	H	1–2	Parsonage (pen)
22	1 February 1904	New Brompton	H	1–1	Parsonage
23	6 February 1904	Brighton & Hove Albion	A	1–3	Underwood
24	13 February 1904	Portsmouth	H	4–0	Underwood (2), Brett (pen), Jay
25	20 February 1904	Northampton Town	A	0–3	
26	27 February 1904	Swindon Town	A	1–1	Barron
27	5 March 1904	West Ham United	H	2–0	Underwood, Barron
28	12 March 1904	Tottenham Hotspur	A	1–1	Buchanan
29	19 March 1904	Luton Town	H	2–1	Bell (2)
30	26 March 1904	New Brompton	A	0–3	
31	2 April 1904	Southampton	H	0–1	
32	9 April 1904	Southampton	A	0–1	
33	16 April 1904	Fulham	A	0–0	
34	23 April 1904	Millwall	A	0–2	

=== FA Cup ===
Round	Date	Opponent	Venue	Result	Scorer(s)
3QR	31 October 1903	Uxbridge	H	8–0	Bell (2), Leigh, Parsonage, Buchanan (2), Underwood (2)
4QR	14 November 1903	Oxford City	A	3–1	Underwood, Leigh, Parsonage
5QR	28 November 1903	Wycombe Wanderers	A	4–1	Leigh (2), Bell, Buchanan
IR	12 December 1903	Plymouth Argyle	H	1–1	Underwood
IR (replay)	16 December 1903	Plymouth Argyle	A	1–4	Buchanan

- Source: 100 Years of Brentford

== Playing squad ==
Note: Flags indicate national team as defined under FIFA eligibility rules; some limited exceptions apply. Players may hold more than one non-FIFA nationality.

Pos.	Nation	Player
GK	ENG	George Bishop
GK	ENG	Bill Howarth
GK	ENG	Tommy Spicer
GK	SCO	Bob Watson
DF	SCO	Tommy Davidson (c)
DF	ENG	Thomas Howarth
DF	SCO	Jock Watson
MF	SCO	James Bellingham
MF	SCO	Alex Caie
MF	ENG	Jimmy Jay
MF	ENG	George Parsonage

Pos.	Nation	Player
FW	ENG	Tommy Atherton (on loan from Grimsby Town)
FW	SCO	John Barron
FW	SCO	Lawrence Bell
FW	ENG	Ralph Brett
FW	SCO	Dave Buchanan
FW	ENG	Charles Lanham
FW	ENG	Tommy Leigh
FW	ENG	James Swarbrick
FW	ENG	Percy Turner
FW	ENG	Tosher Underwood

=== Left club during season ===
Note: Flags indicate national team as defined under FIFA eligibility rules; some limited exceptions apply. Players may hold more than one non-FIFA nationality.

Pos.	Nation	Player
GK	ENG	Joe Frail (to Stalybridge Rovers)

- Source: 100 Years of Brentford

== Coaching staff ==
=== Dick Molyneux (5 September 1903 – March 1904) ===
Name	Role
(England) Dick Molyneux	Secretary Manager
(Ireland) Bob Crone	Trainer

=== William Lewis (March – 23 April 1904) ===
Name	Role
(England) William Lewis	Caretaker Manager
(Ireland) Bob Crone	Trainer

== Statistics ==
=== Appearances ===

Brentford's highest appearance-makers in each position during the Southern League season.

=== Goalscorers ===
Pos.	Nat	Player	SL1	FAC	Total
FW	(Scotland)	Dave Buchanan	6	4	10
FW	(England)	Tosher Underwood	6	4	10
FW	(England)	Tommy Leigh	4	4	8
FW	(Scotland)	Lawrence Bell	4	3	7
HB	(England)	George Parsonage	3	2	5
FW	(Scotland)	John Barron	2	—	2
FW	(England)	Tommy Atherton	2	0	2
HB	(Scotland)	James Bellingham	1	0	1
FW	(England)	Ralph Brett	1	0	1
DF	(Scotland)	Tommy Davidson	1	0	1
HB	(England)	Jimmy Jay	1	0	1
FW	(England)	Percy Turner	1	0	1
FW	(England)	James Swarbrick	1	0	1
Opponents			1	0	1
Total			34	17	51

- Players listed in italics left the club mid-season.
- Source: 100 Years Of Brentford

=== Management ===
Name	Nat	From	To	Record All Comps					Record League				
Name	Nat	From	To	P	W	D	L	W %	P	W	D	L	W %
Dick Molyneux	(England)	5 September 1903	19 March 1904	34	12	9	13	35.29	29	9	8	12	31.03
William Lewis (caretaker)	(England)	26 March 1904	23 April 1904	5	0	1	4	0.00	5	0	1	4	0.00

=== Summary ===
Games played	39 (34 Southern League First Division, 5 FA Cup)
Games won	12 (9 Southern League First Division, 3 FA Cup)
Games drawn	10 (9 Southern League First Division, 1 FA Cup)
Games lost	17 (16 Southern League First Division, 1 FA Cup)
Goals scored	51 (34 Southern League First Division, 17 FA Cup)
Goals conceded	55 (48 Southern League First Division, 7 FA Cup)
Clean sheets	9 (8 Southern League First Division, 1 FA Cup)
Biggest league win	4–0 versus Portsmouth, 13 February 1904
Worst league defeat	5–1 versus Bristol Rovers, 3 October 1903
Most appearances	39, George Parsonage, Jock Watson (34 Southern League First Division, 5 FA Cup)
Top scorer (league)	6, Dave Buchanan, Tosher Underwood
Top scorer (all competitions)	10, Dave Buchanan, Tosher Underwood
