= John Barron (footballer) =

Scottish footballer (1879–1908)

Personal information
- Full name: John Salmond Barron
- Date of birth: 17 February 1879
- Place of birth: Aberdeen, Scotland
- Date of death: 24 July 1908 (aged 29)
- Place of death: Westfield, New Jersey, United States
- Position: Inside right

Senior career*
Years	Team	Apps	(Gls)
–1901	Orion		
1901–1902	Dundee	3	(1)
1902–1903	Orion		
1903–1904	Aberdeen	5	(0)
1904	Brentford	9	(2)
1904	Dundee		
- * Club domestic league appearances and goals

John Salmond Barron (17 February 1879 – 24 July 1908) was a Scottish professional footballer who played in the Scottish League for Dundee as an inside right. He also played in the Southern League for Brentford.

== Personal life ==
Barron emigrated to the United States in September 1905 and died of electrocution while working on overhead wires in Westfield, New Jersey in 1908. He was buried in Rahway Public Cemetery.

== Career statistics ==
Appearances and goals by club, season and competition
Club	Season	League			National cup (Note: Includes Scottish Cup, FA Cup)		Other		Total	
Club	Season	Division	Apps	Goals	Apps	Goals	Apps	Goals	Apps	Goals
Dundee	1901–02	Scottish League First Division	3	1	0	0	—		3	1
Aberdeen	1903–04	Northern League	5	2	1	0	0	0	6	2
Brentford	1903–04	Southern League First Division	9	2	—		—		9	2
Career total			17	5	1	0	0	0	18	5
