= 2010–11 Spartan South Midlands Football League =

The 2010–11 Spartan South Midlands Football League season was the 14th in the history of Spartan South Midlands Football League a football competition in England.

== Premier Division ==
Spartan South Midlands Football League Premier Division
- Season: 2010–11
- Champions: Chalfont St Peter
- Promoted: Chalfont St Peter
- Relegated: Kentish Town; Langford
- Matches: 506
- Goals: 1,798 (3.55 per match)

The Premier Division featured 19 clubs which competed in the division last season, along with four new clubs:

- Aylesbury United, relegated from Southern Football League
- Hadley, promoted from Division One
- Holmer Green, promoted from Division One
- Stotfold, transferred from the United Counties League

Also, Kingsbury London Tigers changed name to London Tigers.

=== League table ===
Pos	Team	Pld	W	D	L	GF	GA	GD	Pts	Promotion or relegation
1	Chalfont St Peter	44	33	4	7	99	34	+65	103	Promoted to the Southern Football League
2	Tring Athletic	44	28	7	9	95	45	+50	91	
3	Royston Town	44	28	6	10	102	52	+50	90	
4	Leverstock Green	44	27	7	10	100	57	+43	88	
5	Colney Heath	44	28	4	12	93	70	+23	88	
6	Aylesbury United	44	23	8	13	94	71	+23	77	
7	Dunstable Town	44	22	4	18	82	75	+7	70	
8	Haringey Borough	44	19	10	15	80	67	+13	67	
9	Hertford Town	44	19	7	18	88	87	+1	64	
10	Broxbourne Borough V&E	44	18	6	20	85	84	+1	60	
11	Hatfield Town	44	19	3	22	75	91	−16	60	
12	Kingsbury London Tigers	44	17	8	19	90	93	−3	59	
13	Stotfold	44	15	12	17	72	68	+4	57	
14	Hadley	44	16	9	19	58	66	−8	57	
15	Hanwell Town	44	16	8	20	77	79	−2	56	
16	Hillingdon Borough	44	15	10	19	84	80	+4	55	
17	Holmer Green	44	14	11	19	74	75	−1	53	
18	St Margaretsbury	44	15	6	23	53	65	−12	51	
19	Oxhey Jets	44	13	9	22	76	91	−15	48	
20	Biggleswade United	44	11	11	22	56	96	−40	44	
21	Harefield United	44	10	8	26	61	109	−48	38	
22	Kentish Town	44	7	8	29	51	117	−66	29	Relegated to Division One
23	Langford	44	7	6	31	53	126	−73	27	Relegated to Division One

Source: fchd
Rules for classification: 1) points; 2) goal difference; 3) number of goals scored.

== Division One ==
Spartan South Midlands Football League Division One
- Season: 2010–11
- Champions: Berkhamsted
- Promoted: Berkhamsted; AFC Dunstable
- Matches: 420
- Goals: 1,611 (3.84 per match)

Division One featured 17 clubs which competed in the division last season, along with five new clubs:

- Berkhamsted, promoted from Division Two
- London Lions, joined from the Herts Senior County League
- St Albans City Reserves, joined from the Capital League
- Welwyn Garden City, relegated from the Premier Division
- Wodson Park, promoted from Division Two

=== League table ===
Pos	Team	Pld	W	D	L	GF	GA	GD	Pts	Promotion
1	Berkhamsted	40	34	5	1	122	36	+86	107	Promoted to the Premier Division
2	AFC Dunstable	40	29	5	6	118	48	+70	92	Promoted to the Premier Division
3	Kings Langley	40	28	3	9	113	56	+57	87	
4	Crawley Green Sports	40	27	5	8	95	44	+51	86	
5	London Colney	40	21	7	12	82	47	+35	70	
6	Bedford Town Reserves	40	22	4	14	76	63	+13	70	Resigned from the league
7	Harpenden Town	40	19	10	11	86	58	+28	67	
8	London Lions	40	19	7	14	94	71	+23	64	
9	Hoddesdon Town	40	16	12	12	75	62	+13	60	
10	New Bradwell St Peter	40	17	6	17	81	67	+14	57	
11	Sun Postal Sports	40	17	4	19	71	97	−26	55	
12	St Albans City Reserves	40	14	10	16	74	76	−2	52	
13	Bedford	40	14	6	20	86	105	−19	48	
14	Wodson Park	40	12	10	18	71	78	−7	46	
15	Cockfosters	40	13	6	21	63	72	−9	45	
16	Ampthill Town	40	13	5	22	67	114	−47	44	
17	Welwyn Garden City	40	10	4	26	54	91	−37	34	
18	Buckingham Athletic	40	8	9	23	51	93	−42	33	
19	Cranfield United	40	7	11	22	51	92	−41	32	
20	Amersham Town	40	6	4	30	43	103	−60	22	
21	Stony Stratford Town	40	6	3	31	38	138	−100	21	
22	Sport London e Benfica	0	0	0	0	0	0	0	0	Club folded, record expunged

Source: fchd
Rules for classification: 1) points; 2) goal difference; 3) number of goals scored.

== Division Two ==
Spartan South Midlands Football League Division Two
- Season: 2010–11
- Champions: Padbury United
- Matches: 210
- Goals: 888 (4.23 per match)

Division Two featured 14 clubs which competed in the division last season, along with two new clubs:

- Brache Sparta, relegated from Division One
- Winslow United, returned to the league after missing one season

=== League table ===
Pos	Team	Pld	W	D	L	GF	GA	GD	Pts	Promotion
1	Padbury United	28	23	3	2	84	27	+57	72	Resigned from the league
2	Totternhoe	28	17	9	2	82	38	+44	60	
3	Aston Clinton	28	18	3	7	80	30	+50	57	
4	Winslow United	28	17	4	7	76	34	+42	55	
5	Risborough Rangers	28	16	5	7	49	21	+28	53	
6	The 61	28	14	8	6	86	42	+44	50	
7	Tring Corinthians	28	13	4	11	61	50	+11	43	
8	Mursley United	28	12	6	10	53	47	+6	42	
9	Kent Athletic	28	11	7	10	71	56	+15	40	
10	Pitstone & Ivinghoe United	28	8	5	15	47	63	−16	29	
11	Bletchley Town	28	7	5	16	53	81	−28	26	
12	Old Bradwell United	28	7	5	16	45	86	−41	26	
13	Caddington	28	5	4	19	40	86	−46	19	
14	Brache Sparta	28	4	3	21	37	95	−58	15	Resigned from the league
15	Milton Keynes Wanderers	28	0	5	23	24	132	−108	5	
16	Bucks Student Union	0	0	0	0	0	0	0	0	Club folded, record expunged

Source: fchd
Rules for classification: 1) points; 2) goal difference; 3) number of goals scored.
