= Anthony Clark (footballer) =

English footballer and manager

Personal information
- Full name: Anthony Carl Clark
- Date of birth: 5 October 1984 (age 42)
- Place of birth: Camden, England
- Position: Midfielder

Team information
- Current team: Hadley (manager)

Youth career
- ?–2002: Southend United

Senior career*
Years	Team	Apps	(Gls)
2002–2004	Southend United	8	(0)
2004	Harrow Borough	16	(6)
2004–2005	Ashford Town (Kent)	27	(13)
2005	Hendon		
2005–2006	Wealdstone		

Managerial career
- 2018–: Hadley
- * Club domestic league appearances and goals

Anthony Carl Clark (born 5 October 1984) is an English professional footballer who plays as a midfielder. He played in the Football League with Southend United. He is first team manager at Hadley.

== Career ==
Clark started his football career with Southend United playing in their youth setup, before making his debut replacing Steven Clark as a substitute in the 79minute minute, in the 2–0 away defeat to Kidderminster Harriers in the Third Division on 30 March 2002. He went on to make another two appearances for Southend during the 2001–02 season.

Having previous played for Harrow Borough and Ashford Town (Kent), Clark joined Hendon in January 2005. He moved to Wealdstone in March. making a total of four appearances scoring once against Fisher Athletic in their London Senior Cup defeat. He moved to Wealdstone in March.
