= Alex Caie =

Scottish footballer

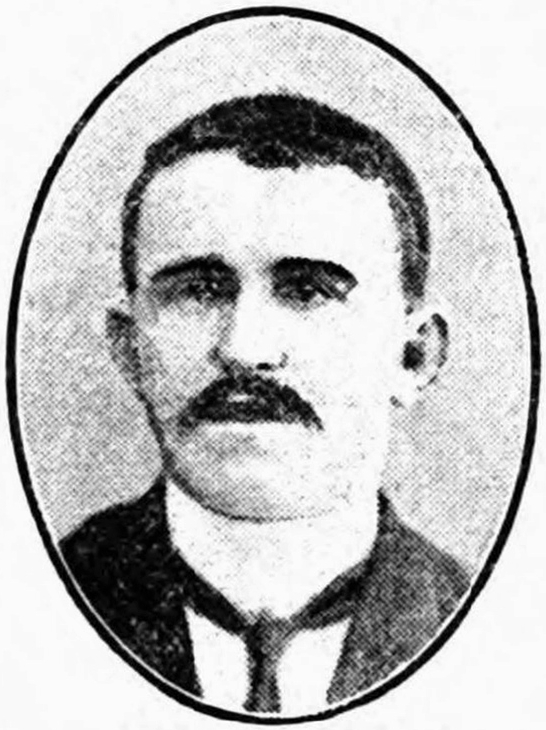
- Caie while with Brentford in 1904

Personal information
- Full name: Alexander Caie
- Date of birth: 25 June 1877
- Place of birth: Nigg, Scotland
- Date of death: 17 November 1914 (aged 37)
- Place of death: Massachusetts, United States
- Positions: Right half; centre forward

Senior career*
| Years | Team | Apps | (Gls) |
| –1897 | Victoria United | | |
| 1897 | Woolwich Arsenal | 8 | (4) |
| 1897–1899 | Bristol City | | |
| 1899–1901 | Millwall Athletic | | |
| 1901–1903 | Newcastle United | 31 | (1) |
| 1903–1904 | Brentford | 22 | (0) |
| 1904 | Motherwell | 6 | (0) |
- Westmount
- Sons of Scotland
- Rosedale
- * Club domestic league appearances and goals

Alexander Caie (25 June 1877 – 17 November 1914), sometimes known as Sandy Caie, was a Scottish professional footballer who played as a right half and centre forward in the Football League for Newcastle United and Woolwich Arsenal. He also played in Scotland and Canada.

== Personal life ==
Caie was killed in a rail accident in Massachusetts, United States on 17 November 1914.

== Career statistics ==
Appearances and goals by club, season and competition
| Club | Season | League | | | National cup (Note: Includes FA Cup, Scottish Cup) | | Total | |
| Club | Season | Division | Apps | Goals | Apps | Goals | Apps | Goals |
|---|---|---|---|---|---|---|---|---|
| Woolwich Arsenal | 1896–97 | Second Division | 8 | 4 | — | | 8 | 4 |
| Newcastle United | 1900–01 | First Division | 21 | 0 | 4 | 0 | 25 | 0 |
| Newcastle United | 1901–02 | First Division | 10 | 1 | 0 | 0 | 10 | 1 |
| Newcastle United | Total | | 31 | 1 | 4 | 0 | 35 | 2 |
| Brentford | 1903–04 | Southern League First Division | 22 | 0 | 3 | 0 | 25 | 0 |
| Motherwell | 1904–05 | Scottish League First Division | 6 | 0 | 0 | 0 | 6 | 0 |
| Career total | | | 67 | 5 | 7 | 0 | 74 | 6 |
