= Dave Buchanan (footballer, born 1873) =

Scottish footballer and manager

Personal information
- Full name: David Muir Buchanan
- Date of birth: 9 March 1878
- Place of birth: Bellshill, Scotland
- Date of death: 15 April 1950 (aged 72)
- Place of death: Edmonton, England
- Position: Right half

Senior career*
Years	Team	Apps	(Gls)
1900–1901	Third Lanark	18	(5)
1901–1903	Bellshill Athletic		
1903–1904	Brentford	28	(6)
1904–1905	Middlesbrough	0	(0)
1905–1906	Plymouth Argyle	29	(2)
1906–1908	Clapton Orient	65	(2)
1908–1912	Leyton	104	(9)

Managerial career
- 1910–1912: Leyton (player-manager)
- 1913–1915: Merthyr Town
- 1922–1923: Hamilton Academical
- –1928: Charlton Athletic
- 1928–1931: Thames
- * Club domestic league appearances and goals

David Muir Buchanan (9 March 1878 – 15 April 1950) was a Scottish professional football right half who played in the Football League for Clapton Orient. After his retirement as a player, he managed in England, Scotland and Wales.

== Career statistics ==
=== Player ===
Club	Season	League			National Cup		Other		Total	
Club	Season	Division	Apps	Goals	Apps	Goals	Apps	Goals	Apps	Goals
Third Lanark	1900–01	Scottish League First Division	18	5	7	3	1 (Note: Appearance in Glasgow Cup)	1	26	9
Brentford	1903–04	Southern League First Division	28	6	5	4	—		33	10
Plymouth Argyle	1905–06	Southern League First Division	29	2	0	0	—		29	2
Career total			75	13	12	7	1	1	88	21

=== Manager ===
Team	From	To	Record					Ref
Team	From	To	G	W	D	L	Win %	Ref
Hamilton Academical	1922	1923	42	13	8	21	30.95	
Total			42	13	8	21	30.95	—
