= Jimmy Jay =

English footballer (1879–1927)

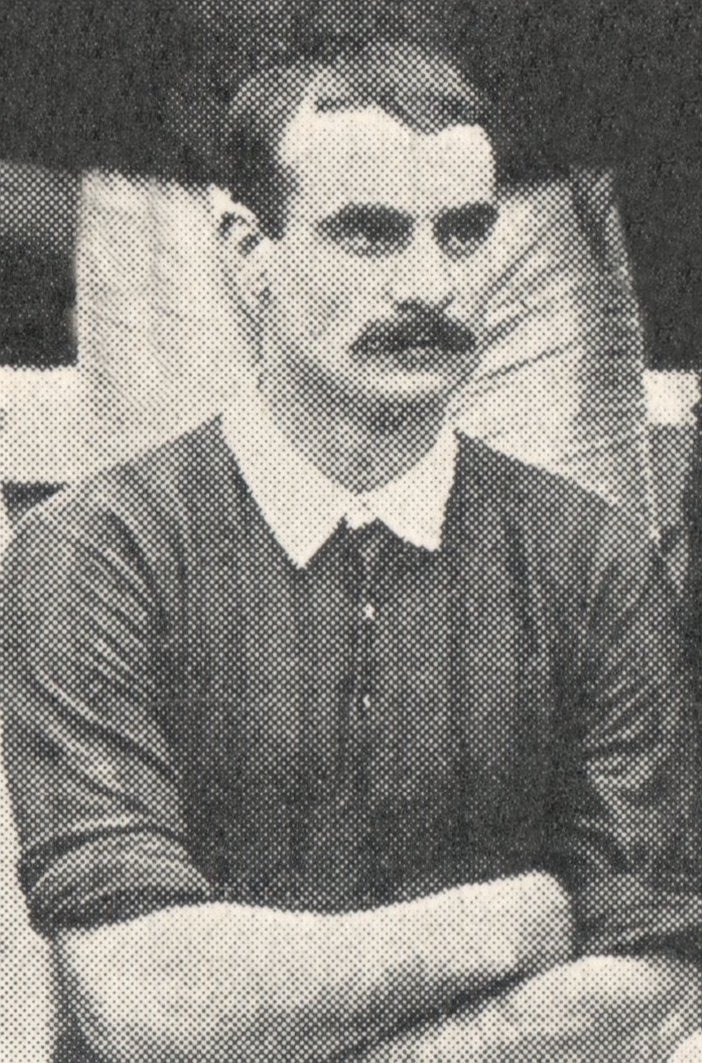
- Jay while with Brentford in 1905.

Personal information
- Full name: James Jay
- Date of birth: July 1879
- Place of birth: Kingswood, England
- Date of death: 13 March 1927 (aged 47)
- Place of death: Bristol, England
- Position: Wing half

Senior career*
Years	Team	Apps	(Gls)
–1901	Bristol East		
1901–1903	Bristol City	22	(4)
1903–1908	Brentford	153	(4)
1908–1910	Brentford	53	(1)
- * Club domestic league appearances and goals

James Jay (July 1879 – 13 March 1927) was an English professional footballer who played as a wing half in the Football League for Bristol City. He is the record Southern League appearance-maker for Brentford and was posthumously inducted into the club's Hall of Fame in 2015.

== Career ==
=== Bristol City ===
A wing half, Jay joined Football League Second Division club Bristol City from Western League Second Division high-flyers Bristol East in September 1901. He made 21 appearances and scored four goals, before departing at the end of the 1902–03 season.

=== Brentford ===
Jay joined Southern League First Division club Brentford in June 1903. He was a regular member of the team until his release at the end of the 1907–08 season. In September 1908, the Bees' management had a change of heart and brought Jay back for two further seasons and gave him a testimonial against Clapton Orient. Jay's 206 Southern League appearances is a club record and he made over 225 senior appearances for Brentford, scoring eight goals.

== Personal life ==
After being released from Brentford in 1908, Jay became a pub landlord in his native Bristol.

== Career statistics ==
Appearances and goals by club, season and competition
Club	Season	League			FA Cup		Total	
Club	Season	Division	Apps	Goals	Apps	Goals	Apps	Goals
Brentford	1903–04	Southern League First Division	22	1	4	0	26	1
Brentford	1904–05	Southern League First Division	28	2	3	0	31	2
Brentford	1905–06	Southern League First Division	32	1	4	0	36	1
Brentford	1906–07	Southern League First Division	37	0	4	0	41	0
Brentford	1907–08	Southern League First Division	34	0	2	0	36	0
Brentford	Total		153	4	17	0	170	4
Brentford	1908–09	Southern League First Division	31	1	2	0	33	1
Brentford	1909–10	Southern League First Division	22	0	0	0	22	0
Brentford	Total		206	5	19	0	225	5
Career total			206	5	19	0	225	5

== Honours ==
Bristol East

- Western League Second Division: 1900–01

Individual

- Brentford Hall of Fame
