= 1912–13 Swansea Town A.F.C. season =

Swansea Town
1912–13 season
- Chairman: John William Thorpe
- Player-Manager: Walter Whittaker
- Stadium: Vetch Field
- Southern Football League: 3rd
- Welsh Cup: Winners
- Top goalscorer: League: Billy Ball (8); All: Billy Ball (19)
Home colours

The 1912–13 season was the first season in which Swansea Town (now known as Swansea City) took part in league and cup football. The club was elected to Division Two of the Southern Football League.

Swansea's first official match was played on 7 September 1912 against local rivals Cardiff City at the Vetch Field. All of Swansea's home games for the 1912–13 season were played on a 'Clinker pitch'.

After a 24-game season the club finished third, narrowly missing out on promotion. The club also entered the Welsh Cup and won it at the first attempt, beating Pontypridd 1–0 in a re-played final.

== Southern Football League ==
Win	Draw	Loss

Division Two Results
Game	Date	Opponents	Venue	Result	Score F–A	Goalscorers	Attendance
1	7 September 1912	Cardiff City	H	D	1–1	Ball	8,000
2	14 September 1912	Ton Pentre	A	W	2–1	Grierson 2	
3	21 September 1912	Newport County	A	W	1–0	Grierson	5,000
4	5 October 1912	Mid-Rhondda	H	W	1–0	Ball	6,000
5	9 November 1912	Pontypridd	H	D	0–0		
6	25 December 1912	Llanelly	H	D	1–1	Coleman	
7	28 December 1912	Aberdare Athletic	H	W	5–4	Ball 3, Coleman, Grierson	
8	18 January 1913	Mardy	H	W	1–0	Grierson	6,000
9	23 January 1913	Aberdare Athletic	A	D	2–2	Coleman, Grierson	
10	1 February 1913	Southend United	A	L	1–3	Grierson	
11	8 February 1913	Luton Town	A	W	4–0	Messer, Coleman 2, Grierson	6,000
12	20 February 1913	Pontypridd	A	D	0–0		
13	1 March 1913	Newport County	H	W	2–1	Ball 2(1p)	10,200
14	8 March 1913	Mid-Rhondda	A	L	0–1		
15	15 March 1913	Cardiff City	A	D	0–0		12,000
16	21 March 1913	Croydon Common	H	W	1–0	Hamilton	10,000
17	22 March 1913	Treharris	A	W	3–1	Anderson 2, Messer	
18	24 March 1913	Croydon Common	A	L	0–3		10,000
19	29 March 1913	Luton Town	H	W	2–0	Ball, Anderson	8,000
20	1 April 1913	Mardy	A	L	0–4		2,000
21	8 April 1913	Llanelly	A	L	0–1		6,000
22	26 April 1913	Southend United	H	W	1–0	Anderson	
23	28 April 1913	Ton Pentre	H	D	0–0		
24	30 April 1913	Treharris	H	W	1–0	Jepp	

=== League table ===
Pos	Team	Pld	W	D	L	GF	GA	GR	Pts	Promotion
1	Cardiff City	24	18	5	1	54	15	3.600	41	Promoted to Division One
2	Southend United	24	14	6	4	43	23	1.870	34	Promoted to Division One
3	Swansea Town	24	12	7	5	29	23	1.261	31	
4	Croydon Common	24	13	4	7	51	29	1.759	30	
5	Luton Town	24	13	4	7	52	39	1.333	30	

Source: rsssf.com
Rules for classification: The system of using goal average to separate two teams tied on points was used up until the 1976-77 season. The points system: 2 points for a win, 1 point for a draw and 0 points for losing.

== Welsh Cup ==
Round	Date	Opponents	Venue	Result	Score F–A	Goalscorers	Attendance
PreQ	31 October 1912	Milford	H	W	3–1	Ball 3	1,000
1	2 November 1912	Mond Nickel	H	D	2–2	Messer, Davidson	
1r	7 November 1912	Mond Nickel	A	W	5–0	Ball 2, Grierson 2, Swarbrick	
2	7 December 1912	Llanelly	H	W	2–1	Messer (p), Ball	3,000
3	4 January 1913	Wrexham	A	W	3–1	Ball 2, Swarbrick	2,000
4	25 January 1913	Merthyr Town	A	W	3–0	Soady 2, Coleman	
SF	15 February 1913	Cardiff City	N	W	4–2	Ball 3, Grierson	
F	19 April 1913	Pontypridd	N	D	0–0		8,310
Fr	24 April 1913	Pontypridd	N	W	1–0	Grierson	10,000

== Player details ==
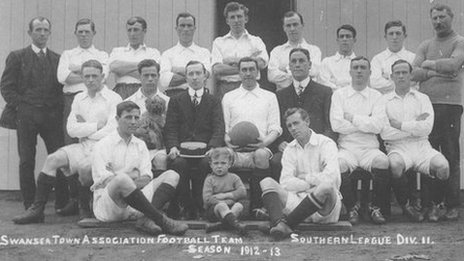
The Swansea Town 1912–13 football team.

No.	Pos.	Name	League		Welsh Cup		Total	
No.	Pos.	Name	Apps	Goals	Apps	Goals	Apps	Goals
1	-	(England) D Anderson	7	4	1	0	8	4
2	FW	(England) Billy Ball	19	8	7	11	26	19
3	-	(England) T Brazell	1	0	1	0	2	0
4	DF	(England) Arthur Cleverley	18	0	4	0	22	0
5	-	(England) J Coleman	18	5	8	1	26	6
6	-	(England) H Davidson	1	0	1	1	2	1
7	MF	(England) John Duffy	23	0	9	0	32	0
8	GK	(England) E Fisher	17	0	5	0	22	0
9	-	(England) G Fyfe	7	0	0	0	7	0
10	-	(England) RT Grierson	19	8	8	4	27	12
11	DF	(England) Jock Hamilton	19	1	7	0	26	1
12	MF	(England) Sam Jepp	20	1	8	0	28	1
13	-	(England) P Jones	1	0	0	0	1	0
14	FW	(Wales) Willie Messer	19	2	7	2	26	4
15	DF	(England) Jack Nicholas	21	0	8	0	29	0
16	-	(England) F Prideaux	10	0	4	0	14	0
17	-	(England) Soady	2	0	1	2	3	2
18	-	(England) A Sutherland	9	0	6	0	15	0
19	FW	(England) Jimmy Swarbrick	22	0	9	2	31	2
20	-	(England) J Weir	4	0	1	0	5	0
21	GK	(England) Walter Whittaker	7	0	4	0	11	0

== Transfers ==
=== Out ===
Date	Pos	Name	To	Fee	Ref
27 June 1913		F Prideaux		Released	
27 June 1913		RT Grierson		Released	
27 June 1913		Soady		Released	
