= James Swarbrick =

English footballer

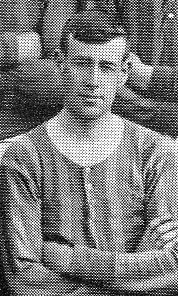
- Swarbrick while with Brentford in 1904

Personal information
- Date of birth: 16 May 1880
- Place of birth: Lytham St Annes, England
- Date of death: March 1970 (aged 89–90)
- Place of death: Swansea, Wales
- Height: 5 ft 9 in (1.75 m)
- Position: Outside left

Senior career*
| Years | Team | Apps | (Gls) |
- Blackpool Red Star
- Marton Combination
- Blackpool Etrurians
| 1901–1902 | Blackburn Rovers | 15 | (0) |
| 1903–1905 | Brentford | 19 | (1) |
| 1905–1907 | Grimsby Town | 67 | (12) |
| 1907–1908 | Oldham Athletic | 4 | (2) |
| 1909 | Southport Central | 0 | (0) |
| –1910 | Brentford | 0 | (0) |
| 1910–1911 | Stoke | 3 | (0) |
| 1911–1912 | Port Vale | 22 | (3) |
| 1912–1913 | Swansea Town | 22 | (0) |
| Total | | 152 | (18) |
- * Club domestic league appearances and goals

James Swarbrick (16 May 1880 – March 1970) was a footballer who played in the English Football League.

== Career ==
Swarbrick started his career with Blackpool Red Star, Marton Combination, and Blackpool Etrurians before joining Blackburn Rovers in November 1901. Rovers finished fourth in the First Division in 1901–02, with Swarbrick playing 15 league games. He then joined Brentford, a club struggling in the Southern League, before signing with Grimsby Town of the Football League Second Division. He played 67 league games for the "Mariners", scoring 12 goals, before moving on to Oldham Athletic in 1907. He played for Oldham in 1907–08, their first Football League campaign, in which they posted a third-place finish, just two points behind the promotion places. He scored twice in four league games for Oldham before moving on to Southport Central, a return to Brentford and then Stoke. He made three appearances in the Birmingham & District League for the "Potters" in 1910–11. After leaving the Victoria Ground he joined rivals Port Vale, and was a regular in the Central League side that lifted the Staffordshire Senior Cup in 1912. In 1912 he transferred to Swansea Town.

== Style of play ==
Swarbrick was noted for his dribbling ability.

== Career statistics ==
Appearances and goals by club, season and competition
| Club | Season | League | | | National cup (Note: Includes FA Cup, Welsh Cup) | | Total | |
| Club | Season | Division | Apps | Goals | Apps | Goals | Apps | Goals |
|---|---|---|---|---|---|---|---|---|
| Blackburn Rovers | 1901–02 | First Division | 2 | 0 | 0 | 0 | 2 | 0 |
| Blackburn Rovers | 1902–03 | First Division | 13 | 0 | 1 | 0 | 14 | 0 |
| Blackburn Rovers | Total | | 15 | 0 | 1 | 0 | 16 | 0 |
| Brentford | 1903–04 | Southern League First Division | 9 | 1 | 0 | 0 | 9 | 1 |
| Brentford | 1904–05 | Southern League First Division | 10 | 0 | 2 | 0 | 12 | 0 |
| Brentford | Total | | 19 | 1 | 2 | 0 | 21 | 1 |
| Grimsby Town | 1905–06 | Second Division | 33 | 4 | 1 | 0 | 34 | 4 |
| Grimsby Town | 1906–07 | Second Division | 34 | 8 | 2 | 0 | 36 | 8 |
| Grimsby Town | Total | | 67 | 12 | 3 | 0 | 70 | 12 |
| Oldham Athletic | 1907–08 | Second Division | 3 | 2 | 0 | 0 | 3 | 2 |
| Oldham Athletic | 1908–09 | Second Division | 1 | 0 | 0 | 0 | 1 | 0 |
| Oldham Athletic | Total | | 4 | 2 | 0 | 0 | 4 | 2 |
| Southport Central | 1909–10 | Lancashire Combination Division One | 0 | 0 | 0 | 0 | 0 | 0 |
| Stoke | 1910–11 | Birmingham & District League; Southern League Second Division | 3 | 0 | 0 | 0 | 3 | 0 |
| Port Vale | 1911–12 | Central League | 22 | 3 | 0 | 0 | 22 | 3 |
| Swansea Town | 1912–13 | Southern League Second Division | 22 | 0 | 9 | 2 | 31 | 2 |
| Career total | | | 152 | 18 | 15 | 2 | 167 | 20 |

== Honours ==
Port Vale

- Staffordshire Senior Cup: 1912
