= Ralph Brett =

English footballer (1877–1947)

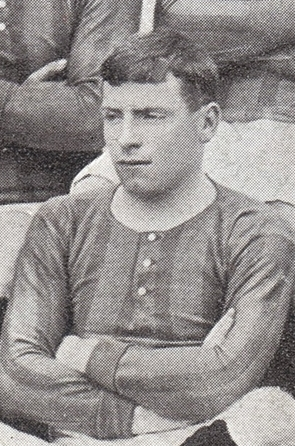
- Brett while with Brentford in 1903

Personal information
- Full name: Ralph Samuel Brett
- Date of birth: 7 March 1877
- Place of birth: Chester, England
- Date of death: December 1947 (aged 70)
- Place of death: Basford, England
- Position: Centre forward

Senior career*
Years	Team	Apps	(Gls)
1896–1897	Southport Central		
- Royal Army Medical Corps
1898	West Bromwich Albion	12	(3)
- Wellingborough
1903–1904	Brentford	17	(1)
- Stoke Newington
- * Club domestic league appearances and goals

Ralph Samuel Brett (7 March 1877 – December 1947) was an English professional footballer who played as a centre forward in the Football League for West Bromwich Albion.

== Personal life ==
Brett served in the Royal Army Medical Corps.

== Career statistics ==
Appearances and goals by club, season and competition
Club	Season	League			FA Cup		Total	
Club	Season	Division	Apps	Goals	Apps	Goals	Apps	Goals
West Bromwich Albion	1898–99	First Division	12	3	0	0	12	3
Brentford	1903–04	Southern League First Division	17	1	0	0	17	1
Career total			29	4	0	0	29	4
