= Tommy Davidson (footballer) =

Scottish footballer (1873–1949)

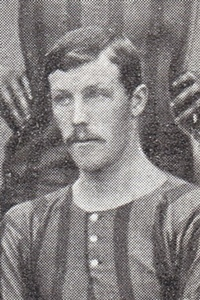
- Davidson while with Brentford 1903

Personal information
- Full name: Thomas Davidson
- Date of birth: 30 April 1873
- Place of birth: West Calder, Scotland
- Date of death: 16 April 1949 (aged 75)
- Place of death: Shotts, Scotland
- Position: Full back

Senior career*
Years	Team	Apps	(Gls)
1888–1893	West Calder		
1893–1894	Dykehead		
1894–1900	Bury	116	(0)
1900–1901	Millwall Athletic	28	(0)
1901–1903	Newcastle United	39	(0)
1903–1905	Brentford	38	(1)
- * Club domestic league appearances and goals

Thomas Davidson (30 April 1873 – 16 April 1949) was a Scottish professional footballer, best remembered for his time as a full back in the Football League with Bury. He made over 110 league appearances and won the 1899–1900 FA Cup with the club.

== Career statistics ==
Appearances and goals by club, season and competition
Club	Season	League			FA Cup		Total	
Club	Season	Division	Apps	Goals	Apps	Goals	Apps	Goals
Bury	1895–96	First Division	18	0	0	0	18	0
Bury	1896–97	First Division	6	0	0	0	6	0
Bury	1897–98	First Division	18	0	0	0	18	0
Bury	1898–99	First Division	33	0	0	0	33	0
Bury	1899–1900	First Division	32	0	0	0	32	0
Bury	Total		107	0	0	0	107	0
Newcastle United	1901–02	First Division	26	0	4	0	30	0
Newcastle United	1902–03	First Division	12	0	1	0	13	0
Newcastle United	Total		38	0	5	0	43	0
Brentford	1903–04	Southern League First Division	33	1	4	0	37	1
Brentford	1904–05	Southern League First Division	5	0	—		5	0
Brentford	Total		38	1	4	0	42	1
Career total			76	1	9	0	85	1

== Honours ==
Bury

- FA Cup: 1899–1900
