= Jeanmal Prosper =

Dominica footballer

Personal information
- Full name: Jeanmal Nyca Prosper
- Date of birth: 25 May 1993 (age 33)
- Place of birth: Roseau, Dominica
- Height: 1.85 m (6 ft 1 in)
- Position: Right-back

Senior career*
Years	Team	Apps	(Gls)
2010–2012	Aylesbury	57	(1)
2012–2014	Arlesey Town	55	(6)
2014	Chesham United	12	(0)
2014–2015	Aylesbury	36	(3)
2015	Hale Leys United	1	(0)
2015–2016	Aylesbury	26	(5)
2016	Hale Leys United	6	(4)
2016	Thame Rangers	0	(0)
2016–2017	Aylesbury	18	(6)
2017	Winslow United	6	(1)
2017–2018	Aylesbury United	36	(3)
2018–2019	Chesham United	19	(1)
2019	Winslow United	2	(0)
2019–2020	Chesham United	33	(1)
2021	Winslow United	1	(0)
2021–2022	Chesham United	13	(1)
2022	Hemel Hempstead Town	1	(0)
2022	Risborough Rangers	1	(0)
2022–2023	Chesham United	41	(11)
2023–2025	Slough Town	82	(4)
2025–2026	Bracknell Town	32	(1)

International career^{‡}
2022–	Dominica	7	(0)
- * Club domestic league appearances and goals as of 19:25, 2 May 2026 (UTC) ‡ National team caps and goals as of 00:04, 2 March 2025 (UTC)

Jeanmal Prosper (born 25 May 1993) is a Dominican footballer who plays as a right-back. Based in England, he plays for the Dominica national team.

== Club career ==
Prosper is a journeyman footballer who spent his entire career below the National League with various semi-pro and professional sides in England. He began his senior career with Aylesbury in 2010. He followed that up with stints at Arlesey Town, Chesham United, Hale Leys United, Thame Rangers, and Winslow United before returning to Chesham United in January 2018. He had a stint with Hemel Hempstead Town in the National League in 2022. His last appearance was with Risborough Rangers in January 2022.

Following a season with Chesham United, he joined National League South club Slough Town in May 2023.

== International career ==
Prosper was born in Roseau, Dominica. He debuted with the senior Dominica national team in a 0–0 2022–23 CONCACAF Nations League tie with Anguilla on 1 June 2022.

== Playing style ==
Prosper is a utility footballer; usually a right-back, he is also able to slot in at centre-back and midfielder.
