= Berkhamsted F.C. =

Association football club in England

Coordinates: 51°45′47″N 0°33′53″W

Berkhamsted
- Full name: Berkhamsted Football Club
- Nickname: The Comrades
- Founded: 2009; 17 years ago
- Ground: Broadwater, Berkhamsted
- Capacity: 2,500 (170 seated)
- Chairman: Ricky Levenston
- Manager: Chris Devane
- League: Southern League Premier Division South
- 2025–26: Southern League Premier Division South, 5th of 22
Home colours	Away colours

Berkhamsted Football Club is a football club based in Berkhamsted, Hertfordshire, England. Founded in 2009 after Berkhamsted Town folded, they are currently members of the Southern League Premier Division South and play at Broadwater.

== History ==
The club was founded in 2009 after Berkhamsted Town folded, taking the name of a club that had played in the Herts County League in the early 20th century. They joined Division Two of the Spartan South Midlands League, winning it in their first season and earning promotion to Division One. The following season they won Division One with 107 points and were promoted to the Premier Division. Their points total was the highest in the National League System and saw the Herts FA award the club the Stanley Rous Memorial Trophy.

The 2012–13 season saw Berkhamsted win the St Mary's Cup, beating Tring Athletic 3–1 in the final. In 2014–15 they won the Premier Division Cup, beating Colney Heath 5–3 on penalties after a 1–1 draw. The club won the Herts Charity Shield in 2016–17 with a 3–2 win over Tring Athletic in the final. In 2017–18 the club were runners-up in the Premier Division, earning promotion to Division One East of the Southern League. They were top of the league after 28 games in 2019–20 when the competition was abandoned due to the COVID-19 pandemic.

Berkhamsted were Division One Central runners-up in 2021–22, but lost to North Leigh in the play-off semi-finals. However, the following season saw them win the division, earning promotion to the Premier Division Central. In 2023–24 they finished bottom of the Premier Division Central and were relegated back to Division One Central. In 2024–25 the club were runners-up in Division One Central. They went on to beat Hadley 5–0 in the play-off semi-finals and then won the final against Flackwell Heath by the same scoreline, securing promotion to the Premier Division South.

== Ground ==
The club play at Broadwater, located between the Grand Union Canal and the West Coast Main Line. The ground has two seated stands on one side of the pitch, with an uncovered terrace adjacent to it. There is also covered terracing behind both goals.

== Honours ==
- Southern Football League
  - Division One Central champions 2022–23
- Spartan South Midlands League
  - Premier Division runners-up 2017–18
  - Division One champions 2010–11
  - Division Two champions 2009–10
  - Premier Division Cup winners 2014–15
- Herts Senior Cup
  - Winners 2022–23
- Herts Charity Shield
  - Winners 2016–17
- St Mary's Cup
  - Winners 2013–14

== Records ==
- Best FA Cup performance: First round, 2026–27
- Best FA Vase performance: Fifth round, 2015–16
- Record attendance: 1,963 vs Flackwell Heath, 5 May 2025
- Biggest win: 12–1 vs Stotfold, FA Cup extra preliminary round, 5 August 2017
- Heaviest defeat: 9–0 vs Coalville Town, Southern League Premier Division Central, 21 October 2023
- Most goals in a season: Matt Bateman, 44 in 2018–19

== See also ==
- Berkhamsted F.C. players
