= Wellingborough Town F.C. =

Association football club in England

Coordinates: 52°17′35″N 0°40′56″W

Wellingborough Town
- Full name: Wellingborough Town Football Club
- Nickname: The Doughboys
- Founded: 1867; 159 years ago 2004; 22 years ago (re-founded)
- Ground: London Road, Wellingborough
- Capacity: 5,000 (350 seated)
- Chairman: Mark Darnell
- Manager: Jake Stone
- League: Northern Premier League Division One Midlands
- 2025–26: Northern Premier League Division One Midlands, 9th of 22
- Website: wellingboroughtownfootballclub.co.uk
Home colours	Away colours

Wellingborough Town F.C. is a football club based in Wellingborough, Northamptonshire, England. They play in the Northern Premier League Division One Midlands. The club was formed in 2004 after the previous club bearing the name had folded.

== History ==
The origins of the club began in 1867 when they formed. The club played originally under the part-handling code, until becoming a genuine football club in 1869, playing at Broad Green, wearing a gold and black strip. In 1879 Wellingborough Town became the first club to play under floodlights, when they entertained Bedford at the Bassett's Close ground, using lights powered by generators at either end of the pitch.

The club joined Division One of the Southern League in 1901–02, moving to their current ground at the Dog & Duck in London Road. In 1905 the club changed name to Wellingborough Redwell but resigned at the end of the season after finishing bottom of Division One, continuing to be called Wellingborough Redwell until reverting to Wellingborough Town in 1919.

Wellingborough joined the Metropolitan League in 1968–69, finishing seventh. They won the title the following season and joined the West Midlands (Regional) League Premier Division, finishing third. In 1971–72, they joined the Southern League Division One North. A reorganisation of the league saw it split into Southern and Midland Divisions, with Wellingborough playing in the Midland Division. However, they struggled until in 1988–89, they were relegated to the United Counties League.

The club struggled for thirteen seasons in the UCL, narrowly avoiding relegation from the Premier Division in a number of seasons. However, they could hold out no longer than 2001–02 when the club folded and they resigned from the League.

=== Rebirth ===
Wellingborough had been without a senior football team for two years when three friends got together to set about re-establishing a football club. Together they assembled a group of twenty-four people who worked to get a new club up and running, including snooker player Peter Ebdon, a local man. The Dog & Duck ground had substantially survived, despite becoming the site of a Travelodge motel.

Wellingborough spent their comeback campaign in the Northamptonshire Senior Youth League. Their application for re-admission to the UCL was approved by the FA. The club finished runners-up in Division One for the loss of just one game in 2005–06 and were promoted back to the Premier Division. Improvements to the ground have seen it graded as suitable for Southern League football.

Under the leadership of chairman Martin Goode, the club ended the 2007–08 season in 10th position, having been on the fringes of promotion throughout the season until a poor run of defeats saw them fall away. Goode resigned in May 2008 with local businessman David Clingo taking over the role. Manager Jason Burnham left in October 2008 to be replaced by Joe Smyth. Clingo, however, stepped down in November 2008 with Martin Potton taking over the role.

In December 2008, the club signed former Premier League striker and Jamaica international Trevor Benjamin.

Smyth and his management team kept the club in the Premier Division of the UCL before stepping down for personal reasons in May 2009. The club then appointed former Northampton Town player Rob Gould as first team manager.

After a disappointing start to the 2012–13 season Rob Gould resigned as manager on 10 September 2012 and was replaced by former Woodford United boss, Phil Mason. When Mason was forced to stand down for personal reasons he was replaced by Craig Adams. The club had endured a poor start to the 2012–13 season but a superb unbeaten run in the New Year saw them ensure survival. A winner from Todd Sawko in the 2–1 home win against Spalding on 25 April made it mathematically certain and the team left the field to the tune of "The Great Escape" over the tannoy.

The 2013–14 season saw the return of former goalscoring hero Jason Turner, who left the club for spells with King's Lynn and Holbeach. He scored prolifically once again as the club enjoyed a much better campaign and posted an attendance of 850 for the Boxing Day clash with AFC Rushden and Diamonds. Manager Craig Adams left for Bedford Town towards the end of the season and was replaced by Ben Watts. With several players having departed during the summer (including Turner to Diamonds) Watts had a difficult job rebuilding the team and left the club after suffering 4 defeats from the opening 4 games. He was replaced by the joint pairing of Steve Herring and Joe Smyth.

On 1 April 2015, it was announced that joint managers Steve Herring and Joe Smyth were to step down at the end of the season. It was also decided later that week that Jamie Wright, former assistant manager under Craig Adams, would take the position of first team manager for the 2015–16 season. In September 2015, Wright and his assistant Colin Cooper, both resigned with Craig Adams returning as Interim First Team Manager.

In November 2015, local management team Jon Mitchell and Stuart Goosey were handed the roles of First Team and Assistant Manager as the Doughboys look to the future with local players making up the majority of the squad. The duo's first result was a 3–1 victory away at Rothwell Corinthians. Although the side remained in the bottom two for much of the campaign, a considerable improvement in form in the final months of the season ensured that they avoided finishing in the relegation spots. A noteworthy achievement because the clubhouse had been destroyed by fire before Christmas and match-day income was drastically reduced until it had been rebuilt.

In the summer of 2016, Chairman Martin Potton stood down and was replaced by Mark Darnell and Darren Wingrove. On 21 July 2016, the club released a joint statement with AFC Rushden and Diamonds, announcing that Dog and Duck landlord Alper Ozdgan had invoked a clause in their lease agreement, forcing them to leave the ground by 31 May 2017. Diamonds confirmed that they would be seeking an alternative ground share, whereas Wellingborough stated that they felt certain that eviction would ultimately bring an end to the club's 149-year existence. However, the club were allowed to remain at the ground, ending the uncertainty.

The 2023–24 season saw Wellingborough promoted from the United Counties Premier Division South as champions. They will compete in the Northern Premier League Midland Division for the 2024–25 season.

== Staff Positions ==
- Manager: Jake Stone
- Assistant manager: Jake Cayton
- 1st Team Coach: Jay Bazzone
- Development Team Managers: Wayne Bellamy

== Notable former players ==
- Phil Neal the former Liverpool and England player. Neal started his career at the club before moving to Northampton Town and on to Liverpool.
- Vic Watson, who left the club to join West Ham United for just £50. Watson went on to become West Ham's all-time record goalscorer, with 326 goals in 15 years at Upton Park.
- Trevor Benjamin, who had previously played for several Football League clubs, including Leicester City.
- Septimus Atterbury, who is best remembered for thirty years of service that he gave to Plymouth Argyle as a player and then a coach.

== Nickname ==
Wellingborough Town's traditional nickname is "The Doughboys", which is thought to derive from the local speciality "'ock 'n' dough". A hock of bacon is an economy cut taken from the front of the leg of the beast. It is cooked slowly in the oven, typically with onions and carrots in a pastry case. There is a notable local public house called the Ock 'n' Dough.

== Reserve Team ==
The original reserve team was disbanded after it was agreed that the first team would share the Dog & Duck ground with AFC Rushden & Diamonds. When the ground share agreement was ended, and Rushden moved on to Hayden Road – Wellingborough Town re-launched their Reserve Team for the 2018/19 season managed by Simon Bishop. Bishop gave a number of the club's under 18 squad their first taste of adult football and finished the season in a creditable 11th place. Lee Goldsborough finished as top goal scorer with 15 goals from 31 appearances.

When Simon Bishop departed for Rushden & Higham United taking his whole squad with him – Chris Smith was appointed Reserve Manager during the summer of 2019–20. The new squad finished in a then record high position of 7th in the UCL Reserve Division.

The 2020–21 season was abandoned due to the COVID-19 pandemic.

== Wellingborough Town Youth Section ==
Wellingborough Town Football Club is a Charter Standard Development club and have a successful junior setup. The Wellingborough Town Youth Section has been running mini soccer, boys and girls football teams since 2004. The purpose of Wellingborough Town Youth Section is for boys and girls to have fun playing football, develop their football skills and progress into senior football within the Wellingborough Town Under 18, Reserve and First Teams.

== Colours ==
The club has worn a variety of colours over the years. It originally wore black and gold, but by 1882 had adopted a black and scarlet "harlequin" (i.e. quartered) jersey, white knickers, and scarlet stockings.

By the early 1890s, the club had black shirts with a white crest. As a Southern League club, Wellingborough originally wore ruby shirts, changing to blue shirts and white shorts by 1901.

== Former players ==
1. Players that have played/managed in the Football League or any foreign equivalent to this level (i.e. fully professional league).
2. Players with full international caps.
3. Players that hold a club record or have captained the club.

- (England) Philip Allen
- (England) Billy Brawn
- (England) Ralph Brett
- (Wales) Iori Jenkins
- (England) Vic Watson
- (England) Darren Collins
- (England) Trevor Benjamin

== Gallery ==
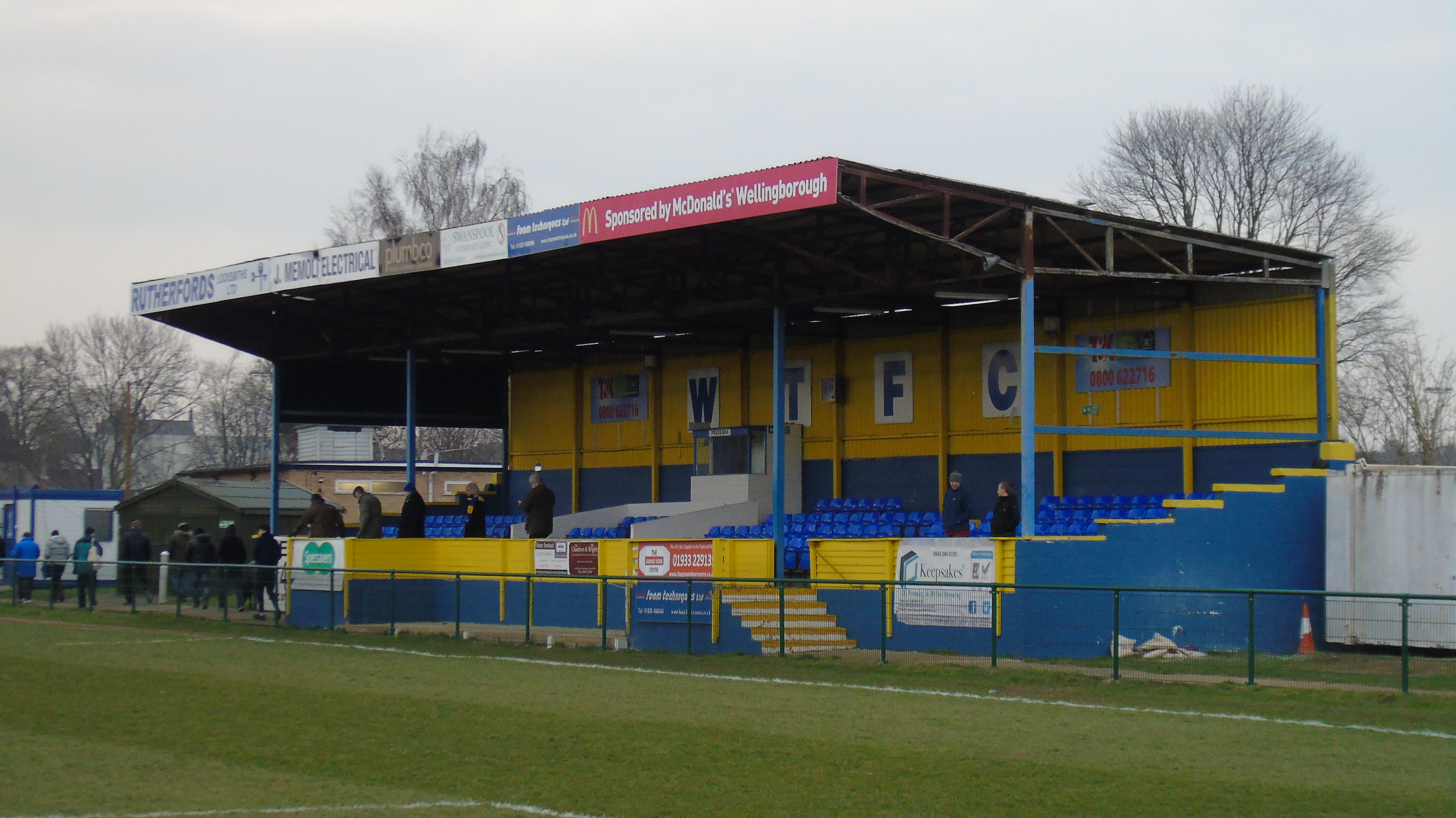
Wellingborough Town F.C. main seated stand

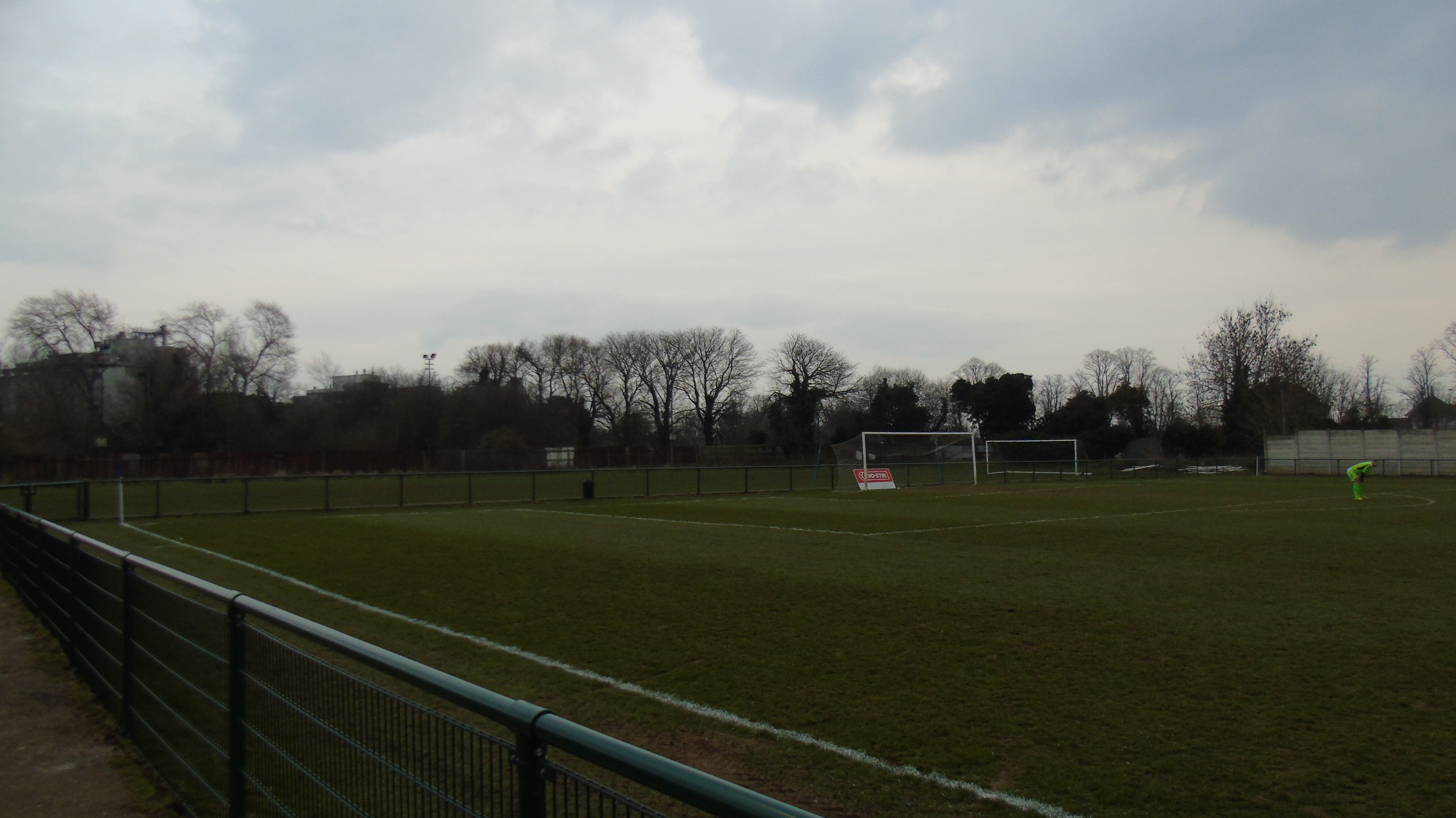
Wellingborough Town F.C. far end walkway and training area

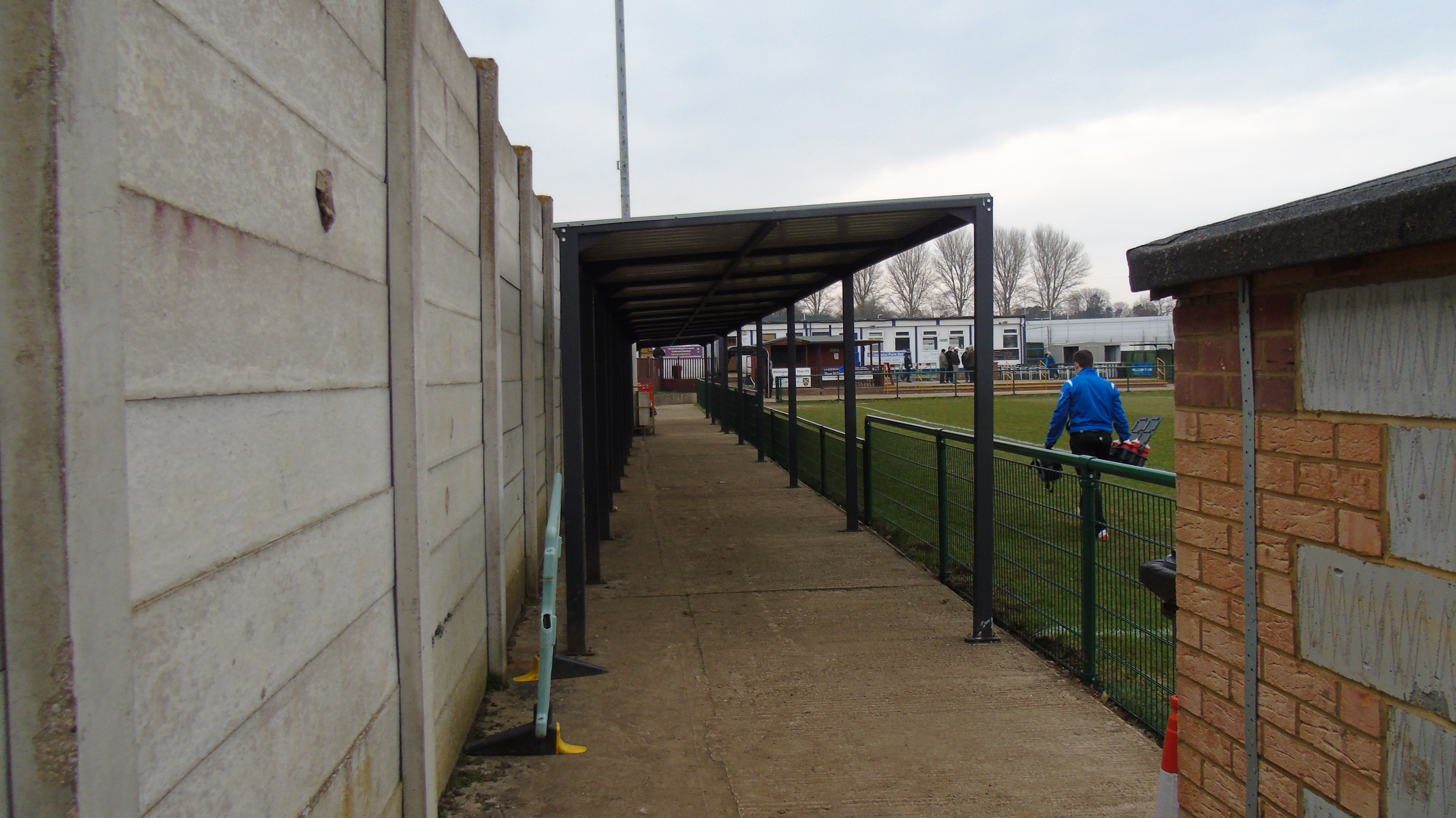
Wellingborough Town F.C. hotel side covered walkway

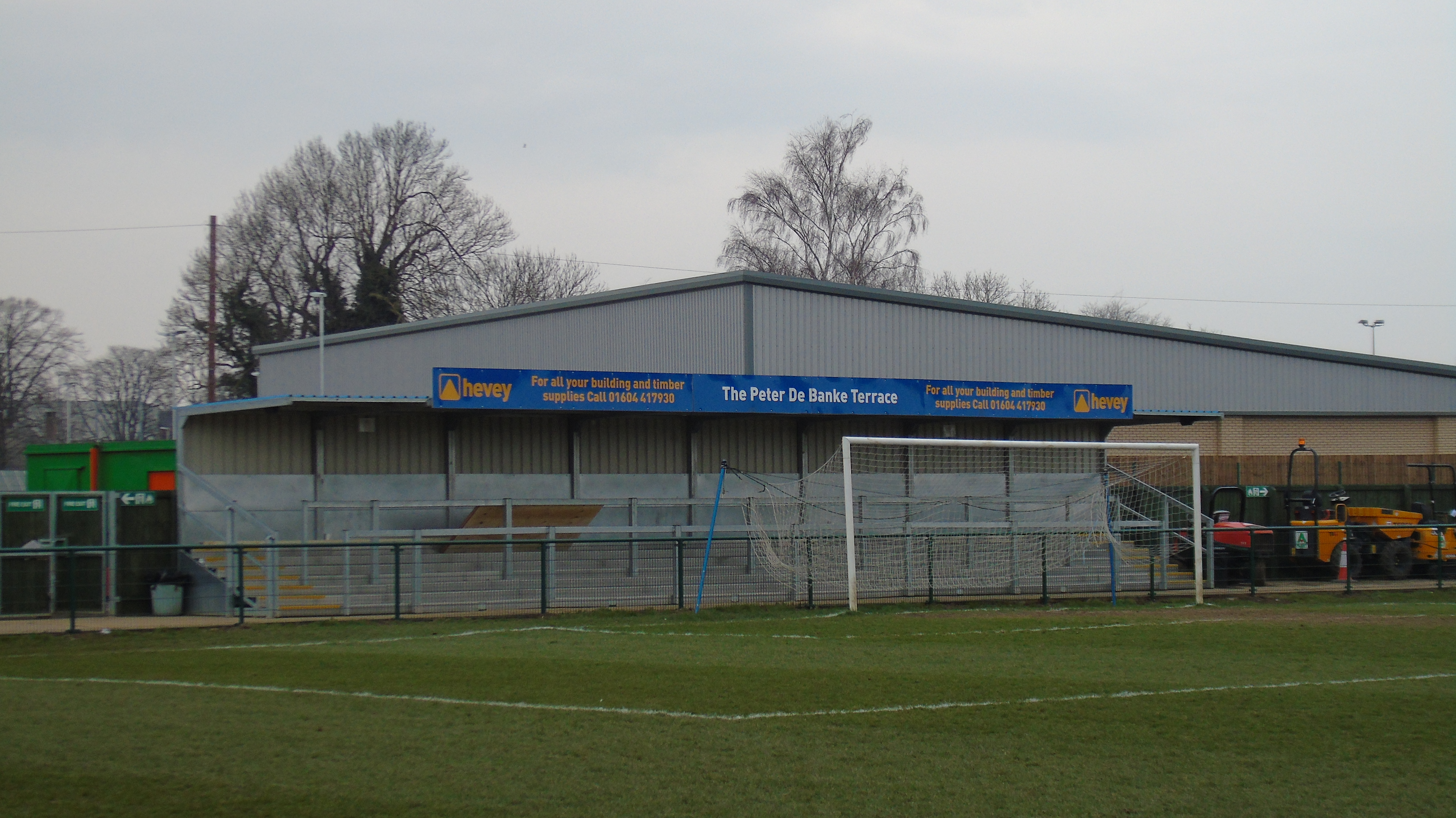
Wellingborough Town F.C. car park end covered terrace

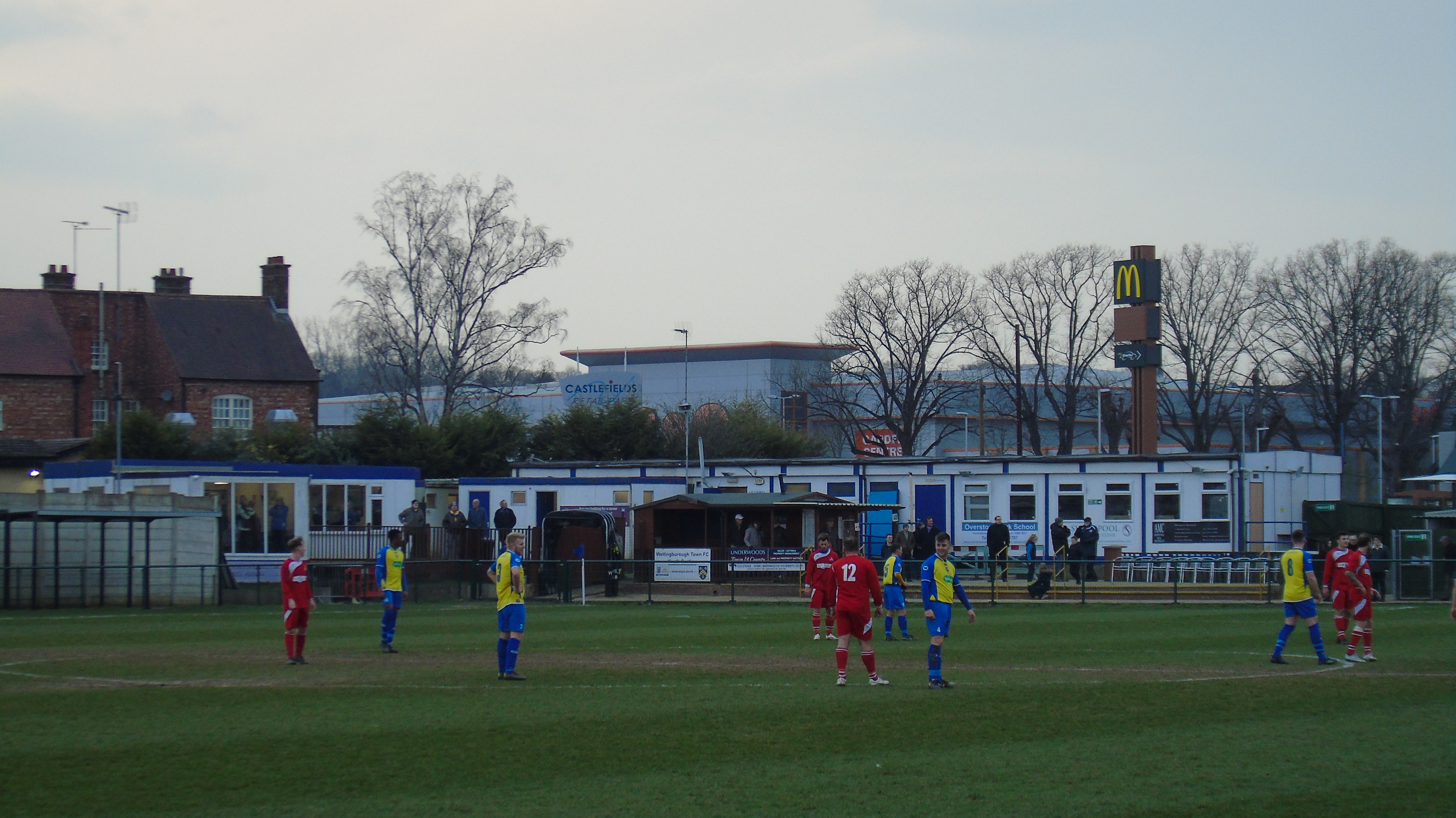
Wellingborough Town F.C. clubhouse changing rooms and teabar

== WTFC TV ==
Wellingborough Town FC had their own internet television station from February 2010 and were one of the first Non-League clubs in the country to do so.

WTFCTV also produced two DVDs which were sold in the club shop.
