= Hadley F.C. =

Association football club in England

Coordinates: 51.6422°N 0.2443°W

Hadley
- Full name: Hadley Football Club
- Nickname: The Bricks
- Founded: 1882
- Ground: Brickfield Lane, Arkley
- Capacity: 2,000 (150 seated)
- Chairman: Steve Gray
- Manager: Anthony Clark
- League: Southern League Division One Central
- 2025–26: Southern League Division One Central, 10th of 22
Home colours	Away colours

Hadley Football Club is a football club based in Arkley, Barnet, England. Affiliated to the Hertfordshire County Football Association, they are currently members of the Southern League Division One Central and play at Brickfield Lane.

== History ==
The club was founded in 1882, and started playing in the North Middlesex League. They joined the Barnet & District League in 1922, which they played in until transferring to the North Suburban League in 1957. In 1970 the club switched to the Mid-Herts League, going on to win back-to-back Premier Division titles in 1975–76 and 1976–77 and the Premier Division Shield in 1976–77.

In 1977 Hadley joined Division Three of the Hertfordshire Senior County League. They won the division at the first attempt, earning promotion to Division One rather than Division Two. The following season, 1978–79, saw them finish the season as Division One runners-up, resulting in promotion to the Premier Division. However, they were relegated back to Division One after finishing bottom of the Premier Division in 1983–84. At the end of the 1984–85 season the club left the league to join the Southern Olympian League. They rejoined Division One of the Hertfordshire Senior County League in 1999, and were promoted to the Premier Division after winning the Division One title in 2001–02. In 2003–04 they won the Premier Division and the Herts Senior Centenary Trophy. They retained the league title the following season and won the league's Aubrey Cup in 2005–06.

At the end of the 2006–07 season the club made an application to join the Spartan South Midlands league, this was blocked by the Herts County League, so the following season the club dropped out of the league and played in the West Herts Saturday League Premier Division, which they won at the first attempt. Another application was made to join the Spartan South Midlands League in 2008 and the club was accepted into Division Two. The 2008–09 season saw them finish the season as Division Two runners-up, earning promotion to Division One, as well as winning the Division Two Cup. They went on to finish second in Division One the following season and were promoted to the Premier Division. In 2015–16 they won the Herts Charity Shield, beating Tring Athletic 3–1 in the final. At the end of the 2018–19 season the club were transferred to the Essex Senior League. Two seasons later they were transferred back to the Premier Division of the Spartan South Midlands League.

In 2021–22 Hadley won the Spartan South Midlands League Challenge Trophy, defeating Stotfold 3–1 in the final. They went on to finish third in the Premier Division, earning promotion to Division One Central of the Southern League after second-placed Risborough Rangers failed the ground grading criteria. In 2024–25 the club won the Herts Charity Cup, beating Welwyn Garden City 4–2 in the final. They also finished fifth in Division One Central, qualifying for the promotion play-offs in which they lost 5–0 to Berkhamsted in the semi-finals.

== Ground ==
The club originally played on Hadley Common in Monken Hadley. Around 1947 the club moved to Wrotham Park, where they played until around 1955, when they moved to Barnet Playing Fields. They played at St Albans Road in Barnet during the 1977–78 season but had their lease terminated at the end of the season, so moved to Chandos Avenue in Whetstone, the England training base.

In 1985 the club moved to Woodside Park Club in Totteridge, before moving to Brickfield Lane in Arkley in 1992. At the start of the 2008–09 season the club started playing at Parkfield in Potters Bar, before returning to Brickfield Lane in 2016 following installation of new floodlights and a stand.

== Honours ==
- Spartan South Midlands League
  - Challenge Trophy winners 2021–22
  - Division Two Cup winners 2008–09
- Hertfordshire Senior County League
  - Premier Division champions 2003–04, 2004–05
  - Division One champions 2001–02
  - Division Three champions 1977–78
  - Aubrey Cup winners 2005–06
  - Centenary Trophy winners 2003–04
- Mid-Herts Football League
  - Premier Division champions 1975–76, 1976–77
  - Premier Division Shield winners 1976–77
- West Herts Saturday League
  - Champions 2007–08
- Herts Senior Centenary Trophy
  - Winners 2003–04
- Herts Charity Cup
  - Winners 2024–25
- Herts Charity Shield
  - Winners 2015–16

== Records ==
- Best FA Cup performance: Third qualifying round, 2016–17, 2019–20
- Best FA Trophy performance: Third round, 2024–25
- Best FA Vase performance: Fifth round, 2020–21

== See also ==
- Hadley F.C. players
- Hadley F.C. managers
