= 1908–09 Brentford F.C. season =

English football team season

Brentford
1908–09 season
- Chairman: Harry Blundell
- Secretary Manager: Fred Halliday
- Stadium: Griffin Park
- Southern League First Division: 21st
- FA Cup: Second round
- Top goalscorer: League: Reid (18); All: Reid (18)
Home colours

During the 1908–09 English football season, Brentford competed in the Southern League First Division. A disastrous season ended with a bottom-place finish, but the club was spared relegation after the First Division was expanded in June 1909.

== Season summary ==
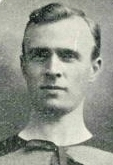
Manager Fred Halliday brought right half Phil Richards to Griffin Park from his previous club Bradford Park Avenue.

After encountering severe financial problems during the 1907–08 season, the Brentford committee was forced to dispense with the majority of the first team squad in May 1908, due to many of the players being unwilling to accept lower wages for the 1908–09 season. Top-scorer Adam Bowman had been sold in April and he was followed out of Griffin Park by Tosher Underwood, Jock Watson, Jock Hamilton, Tom McAllister, George Parsonage, Fred Corbett, Jimmy Tomlinson, Andy Clark, John Montgomery, Vince Hayes and Patsy Hendren, while Oakey Field (who had returned in November 1907), Charlie Williams and Jimmy Jay elected to retire. Fred Halliday was appointed Brentford manager on 24 June and began assembling an almost entirely new squad, which eventually reduced the wage bill by 20%, to £2,565 across the entire season (equivalent to £337,700 in 2023).

Brentford endured a forgettable Southern League First Division season, matching the 33 points won during the previous season, but instead finishing five places lower at the bottom of the table. The return of Jimmy Jay in October helped solidify the back lines, which up to that point were leaking goals. Forward Alex McCulloch, signed during the 1908 off-season, caught the eye of manager Halliday's former club Bradford Park Avenue and departed for a £350 fee in November, with Geordie Reid arriving at Griffin Park in part-exchange. Reid would top-score for the Bees during the season with 18 goals. There was some cheer late in the season, with the Bees winning the Southern Professional Charity Cup.

Brentford's bottom-place finish was initially no cause for concern, with plans afoot for 16 Southern League clubs, plus another two from a list of six (which included Brentford), to form a Third Division of the Football League. The chance fell through when the Football League First and Second Division clubs voted against the formation of a Third Division, but Brentford were saved from relegation when the Southern League opted to expand to 22 clubs in June 1909, with Croydon Common being promoted from the Second Division and thus preserving Brentford's First Division status.

== League table ==
Pos	Team	Pld	W	D	L	GF	GA	GR	Pts
17	West Ham United	40	16	4	20	56	60	0.933	36
18	Brighton & Hove Albion	40	14	7	19	60	61	0.984	35
19	Norwich City	40	12	11	17	59	75	0.787	35
20	Coventry City	40	15	4	21	64	91	0.703	34
21	Brentford	40	13	7	20	59	74	0.797	33

Rules for classification: The system of using goal average to separate two teams tied on points was used until the 1976-77 season. The points system: 2 points for a win, 1 point for a draw and 0 points for losing.

== Results ==
Brentford's goal tally listed first.

=== Legend ===
Win	Draw	Loss

=== Southern League First Division ===
No.	Date	Opponent	Venue	Result	Scorer(s)
1	2 September 1908	Reading	A	2–2	Sugden (2)
2	5 September 1908	Southampton	H	2–2	McCulloch, Glen
3	12 September 1908	Leyton	A	0–2	
4	19 September 1908	West Ham United	H	1–0	McCulloch
5	26 September 1908	Brighton & Hove Albion	A	0–4	
6	28 September 1908	Queens Park Rangers	H	0–0	
7	3 October 1908	Crystal Palace	H	1–3	Connelly
8	10 October 1908	Plymouth Argyle	A	0–2	
9	17 October 1908	Luton Town	A	1–3	Ryalls
10	24 October 1908	Swindon Town	H	1–0	McCulloch
11	31 October 1908	Portsmouth	A	3–2	Glen, Connelly, Jay
12	7 November 1908	Queens Park Rangers	A	0–3	
13	14 November 1908	Northampton Town	A	2–3	Reid, Glen
14	16 November 1908	Exeter City	H	0–2	
15	21 November 1908	New Brompton	H	1–1	Connelly
16	23 November 1908	Southend United	H	4–1	Reid, Connelly (2), Sugden
17	28 November 1908	Millwall	A	1–2	Reid
18	12 December 1908	Coventry City	A	2–1	Buxton, Badger
19	19 December 1908	Bristol Rovers	H	2–2	Reid, Connelly
20	25 December 1908	Watford	H	3–1	Connelly, Sugden, Reid
21	26 December 1908	Norwich City	A	1–6	Buxton
22	28 December 1908	Reading	H	2–3	Buxton, Reid
23	2 January 1909	Southampton	A	0–1	
24	9 January 1909	Leyton	H	0–0	
25	23 January 1909	West Ham United	A	0–3	
26	30 January 1909	Brighton & Hove Albion	H	4–0	Reid (4)
27	13 February 1909	Plymouth Argyle	H	1–0	Reid
28	20 February 1909	Luton Town	H	2–2	Reid, Sugden
29	27 February 1909	Swindon Town	A	1–2	McKenzie
30	13 March 1909	Exeter City	A	2–1	Reid, Sugden
31	20 March 1909	Northampton Town	H	3–1	Connelly (2), Ramsden (pen)
32	27 March 1909	New Brompton	A	1–1	Sugden
33	29 March 1909	Portsmouth	H	1–2	Reid
34	31 March 1909	Crystal Palace	A	1–3	Nicholson
35	3 April 1909	Millwall	H	4–2	McIver (2, 2 pen), Nicholson, Connelly
36	9 April 1909	Norwich City	H	3–1	Sugden, Connelly, Buxton
37	10 April 1909	Southend United	A	0–1	
38	12 April 1909	Watford	A	0–2	
39	17 April 1909	Coventry City	H	5–2	Reid (2), Nicholson, Sugden, Connelly
40	24 April 1909	Bristol Rovers	A	2–3	Reid (2)

=== FA Cup ===
Round	Date	Opponent	Venue	Result	Scorer
1R	16 January 1909	Gainsborough Trinity	H	2–0	Richards (2)
2R	6 February 1909	Nottingham Forest	A	0–1	

- Source: 100 Years of Brentford

== Playing squad ==
Note: Flags indicate national team as defined under FIFA eligibility rules; some limited exceptions apply. Players may hold more than one non-FIFA nationality.

Pos.	Nation	Player
GK	ENG	Willie McIver
DF	ENG	Dave Ewing
DF	ENG	Ernest Ramsden
DF	ENG	Dusty Rhodes (c)
MF	ENG	Bert Badger
MF	SCO	John Gordon
MF	ENG	Joe Hisbent
MF	ENG	Jimmy Jay
MF	ENG	George Podmore
MF	ENG	Phil Richards
FW	ENG	Steve Buxton

Pos.	Nation	Player
FW	ENG	Fred Connelly
FW	SCO	Alex Glen
FW	SCO	Gladstone Hamilton
FW	SCO	William Jaffray
FW	SCO	Ronald McKenzie
FW	ENG	Arthur Nicholson
FW	SCO	Geordie Reid
FW	ENG	Joe Ryalls
FW	ENG	Sidney Sugden
FW	ENG	Lindsay Syrad

=== Left club during season ===
Note: Flags indicate national team as defined under FIFA eligibility rules; some limited exceptions apply. Players may hold more than one non-FIFA nationality.

Pos.	Nation	Player
FW	SCO	Alex McCulloch (to Bradford Park Avenue)

- Source: 100 Years of Brentford

== Coaching staff ==
Name	Role
(England) Fred Halliday	Secretary Manager
(England) Tom Cowper	Trainer

== Statistics ==
=== Appearances ===

Brentford's highest appearance-makers in each position during the Southern League season.

=== Goalscorers ===
Pos.	Nat	Player	SL1	FAC	Total
FW	(Scotland)	Geordie Reid	18	0	18
FW	(England)	Fred Connelly	12	0	12
FW	(England)	Sidney Sugden	9	0	9
FW	(England)	Steve Buxton	4	0	4
FW	(Scotland)	Alex Glen	3	0	3
FW	(Scotland)	Alex McCulloch	3	0	3
FW	(England)	Arthur Nicholson	3	0	3
GK	(England)	Willie McIver	2	0	2
HB	(England)	Phil Richards	0	2	2
HB	(England)	Bert Badger	1	0	1
HB	(England)	Jimmy Jay	1	0	1
FW	(Scotland)	Ronald McKenzie	1	0	1
DF	(England)	Ernest Ramsden	1	0	1
FW	(England)	Joe Ryalls	1	0	1
Total			59	2	61

- Players listed in italics left the club mid-season.
- Source: 100 Years Of Brentford

=== Management ===
Name	Nat	From	To	Record All Comps					Record League				
Name	Nat	From	To	P	W	D	L	W %	P	W	D	L	W %
Fred Halliday	(England)	2 September 1908	24 April 1909	42	14	7	21	33.33	40	13	7	20	32.50

=== Summary ===
Games played	42 (40 Southern League First Division, 2 FA Cup)
Games won	14 (13 Southern League First Division, 1 FA Cup)
Games drawn	7 (7 Southern League First Division, 0 FA Cup)
Games lost	21 (20 Southern League First Division, 1 FA Cup)
Goals scored	61 (59 Southern League First Division, 2 FA Cup)
Goals conceded	75 (74 Southern League First Division, 1 FA Cup)
Clean sheets	7 (6 Southern League First Division, 1 FA Cup)
Biggest league win	4–0 versus Brighton & Hove Albion, 30 January 1909
Worst league defeat	6–1 versus Norwich City, 26 December 1908
Most appearances	42, Willie McIver, Joe Ryalls (40 Southern League First Division, 2 FA Cup)
Top scorer (league)	18, Geordie Reid
Top scorer (all competitions)	18, Geordie Reid
