= 1906–07 Brentford F.C. season =

English football team season

Brentford
1906–07 season
- Chairman: Charlie Dorey
- Secretary Manager: William Brown
- Stadium: Griffin Park
- Southern League First Division: 10th
- FA Cup: Third round
- Top goalscorer: League: Corbett (15); All: Corbett (16)
- Highest home attendance: 21,478
Home colours

During the 1906–07 English football season, Brentford competed in the Southern League First Division. The highlight of the mid-table season was a run to the third round of the FA Cup.

== Season summary ==
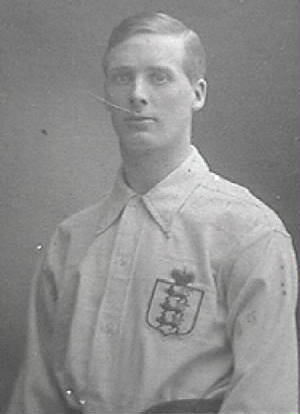
Future England international forward Fred Pentland scored 13 goals during the season.

Following the death of Dick Molyneux, William Brown was appointed Brentford secretary-manager on a permanent basis at the end of the 1905–06 season, having initially been appointed interim manager in February 1906. He retained the Bees' nucleus of players (Watson, Jay, Parsonage, Tomlinson, Corbett, Underwood, Greaves, Shanks) and brought in a new goalkeeper (Williams), two full backs (McConnell and Taylor), half back Haworth and four new forwards (Greechan, Hagan, McAllister and Pentland).

Brentford were a model of inconsistently throughout the Southern League First Division season, only winning consecutive matches on two occasions. Key forward Tommy Shanks went on strike early in the season and was transferred to Leicester Fosse for £250, which weakened the forward line. Fred Pentland proved to be an able replacement and finished as second-leading goalscorer behind Fred Corbett. The highlight of the mid-table season was a run to the third round of the FA Cup for the second consecutive season, though the Bees were denied a first appearance in the fourth round after being taken to a replay by Southern League First Division strugglers Crystal Palace and then suffering defeat at Griffin Park. Brentford finished the season £150 in profit (equivalent to £20,000 in 2023), the first time the club had done so since turning professional in late 1899.

Two club records were set during the season:

- Most Southern League home wins in a season: 14
- Most Southern League away draws in a season: 5

== League table ==
Pos	Team	Pld	W	D	L	GF	GA	GR	Pts
8	Norwich City	38	15	12	11	57	48	1.188	42
9	Watford	38	13	16	9	46	43	1.070	42
10	Brentford	38	17	8	13	57	56	1.018	42
11	Southampton	38	13	9	16	49	56	0.875	35
12	Reading	38	14	6	18	57	47	1.213	34

Rules for classification: The system of using goal average to separate two teams tied on points was used until the 1976-77 season. The points system: 2 points for a win, 1 point for a draw and 0 points for losing.

== Results ==
Brentford's goal tally listed first.

=== Legend ===
Win	Draw	Loss

=== Southern League First Division ===
No.	Date	Opponent	Venue	Result	Scorer(s)
1	1 September 1906	Watford	H	2–0	Corbett, Underwood
2	8 September 1906	Northampton Town	A	0–4	
3	15 September 1906	Queens Park Rangers	H	4–1	Greechan, Corbett, Underwood, Pentland
4	22 September 1906	Fulham	A	0–1	
5	29 September 1906	Southampton	H	2–1	Greechan, Corbett
6	6 October 1906	West Ham United	A	1–3	Pentland (pen)
7	13 October 1906	Tottenham Hotspur	H	2–2	Greaves, Underwood
8	20 October 1906	Swindon Town	A	0–2	
9	27 October 1906	Norwich City	H	2–1	Corbett (2)
10	3 November 1906	Luton Town	A	0–2	
11	10 November 1906	Crystal Palace	H	2–0	Hagan, Pentland (pen)
12	17 November 1906	Bristol Rovers	A	1–3	McAllister
13	24 November 1906	Millwall	A	0–0	
14	1 December 1906	Leyton	H	2–0	Tomlinson, Corbett
15	8 December 1906	Portsmouth	A	0–0	
16	15 December 1906	New Brompton	H	3–0	Harvey (og), McAllister, Hagan
17	22 December 1906	Plymouth Argyle	A	2–2	Corbett, McAllister
18	25 December 1906	Brighton & Hove Albion	H	3–1	Hagan, Parsonage, Corbett
19	27 December 1906	Reading	A	0–4	
20	29 December 1906	Watford	A	4–1	McAllister, Pentland (2), Syrad
21	5 January 1907	Northampton Town	H	2–0	Corbett, Hagan
22	26 January 1907	Fulham	H	1–0	Corbett
23	9 February 1907	West Ham United	H	0–0	
24	16 February 1907	Tottenham Hotspur	A	0–2	
25	2 March 1907	Norwich City	A	1–1	Greaves
26	9 March 1907	Luton Town	H	0–1	
27	11 March 1907	Queens Park Rangers	A	1–1	Greaves
28	16 March 1907	Crystal Palace	A	3–0	Parsonage, Pentland (2, 1 pen)
29	18 March 1907	Southampton	A	0–5	
30	23 March 1907	Bristol Rovers	H	2–1	McAllister, Hagan
31	29 March 1907	Brighton & Hove Albion	A	1–3	Pentland
32	30 March 1907	Millwall	H	0–2	
33	1 April 1907	Reading	H	4–2	Pentland (4, 2 pen)
34	6 April 1907	Leyton	A	3–1	McAllister, Corbett (2)
35	8 April 1907	Swindon Town	H	5–2	McAllister, Underwood, Corbett (2), Hagan
36	13 April 1907	Portsmouth	H	1–1	McAllister
37	20 April 1907	New Brompton	A	0–5	
38	27 April 1907	Plymouth Argyle	H	2–1	Hagan, Corbett

=== FA Cup ===
Round	Date	Opponent	Venue	Result	Scorer(s)
1R	12 January 1907	Glossop	H	2–1	Corbett, Pentland (pen)
2R	2 February 1907	Middlesbrough	H	1–0	Hagan
3R	23 February 1907	Crystal Palace	A	1–1	Hagan
3R (replay)	27 February 1907	Crystal Palace	H	0–1	

- Source: 100 Years of Brentford

== Playing squad ==
Note: Flags indicate national team as defined under FIFA eligibility rules; some limited exceptions apply. Players may hold more than one non-FIFA nationality.

Pos.	Nation	Player
GK	ENG	Charlie Williams
DF	ENG	Raymond Abbott
DF	ENG	Albert Bull
DF	ENG	Alf Gilson
DF	SCO	John McConnell
DF	SCO	Jock Watson
MF	ENG	Robert Haworth
MF	ENG	Jimmy Jay
MF	ENG	George Parsonage (c)
MF	ENG	Jimmy Tomlinson

Pos.	Nation	Player
FW	ENG	Fred Corbett
FW	ENG	David Greaves
FW	SCO	James Greechan
FW	ENG	Neve Grice
FW	SCO	Patrick Hagan
FW	SCO	Tom McAllister
FW	SCO	John McCourt
FW	ENG	Fred Pentland
FW	ENG	Lindsay Syrad
FW	ENG	Tosher Underwood

=== Left club during season ===
Note: Flags indicate national team as defined under FIFA eligibility rules; some limited exceptions apply. Players may hold more than one non-FIFA nationality.

Pos. / Nation / Player; FW / IRL / Tommy Shanks (to Leicester Fosse)	Pos. / Nation / Player; DF / SCO / Archie Taylor (to West Ham United)

- Source: 100 Years of Brentford

== Coaching staff ==
Name	Role
(England) William Brown	Secretary Manager
(Ireland) Bob Crone	Trainer

== Statistics ==
=== Appearances ===

Brentford's highest appearance-makers in each position during the Southern League season.

=== Goalscorers ===
Pos.	Nat	Player	SL1	FAC	Total
FW	(England)	Fred Corbett	15	1	16
FW	(England)	Fred Pentland	12	1	13
FW	(Scotland)	Tom McAllister	9	0	9
FW	(Scotland)	Patrick Hagan	7	2	9
FW	(England)	Tosher Underwood	4	0	4
FW	(England)	David Greaves	3	0	3
FW	(Scotland)	James Greechan	2	0	2
HB	(England)	George Parsonage	2	0	2
FW	(England)	Lindsay Syrad	1	0	1
HB	(England)	Jimmy Tomlinson	1	0	1
Opponents			1	0	1
Total			57	4	61

- Players listed in italics left the club mid-season.
- Source: 100 Years Of Brentford

=== Management ===
Name	Nat	From	To	Record All Comps					Record League				
Name	Nat	From	To	P	W	D	L	W %	P	W	D	L	W %
William Brown	(England)	1 September 1906	27 April 1907	42	20	8	14	47.62	38	17	8	13	44.74

=== Summary ===
Games played	42 (38 Southern League First Division, 4 FA Cup)
Games won	20 (17 Southern League First Division, 3 FA Cup)
Games drawn	8 (8 Southern League First Division, 0 FA Cup)
Games lost	14 (13 Southern League First Division, 1 FA Cup)
Goals scored	61 (57 Southern League First Division, 4 FA Cup)
Goals conceded	59 (56 Southern League First Division, 3 FA Cup)
Clean sheets	11 (10 Southern League First Division, 1 FA Cup)
Biggest league win	3–0 on two occasions; 4–1 on two occasions; 5–2 versus Swindon Town, 8 April 1907
Worst league defeat	5–0 on two occasions
Most appearances	42, Jock Watson, Charlie Williams (38 Southern League First Division, 4 FA Cup)
Top scorer (league)	15, Fred Corbett
Top scorer (all competitions)	16, Fred Corbett
