= 1904–05 Brentford F.C. season =

English football team season

Brentford
1904–05 season
- Chairman: Charlie Dorey
- Secretary Manager: Dick Molyneux
- Stadium: Griffin Park
- Southern League First Division: 14th
- FA Cup: Intermediate round
- Top goalscorer: League: Shanks (7); All: Shanks (7)
Home colours

During the 1904–05 English football season, Brentford competed in the Southern League First Division. In its first season at Griffin Park, the club finished in 14th place.

== Season summary ==
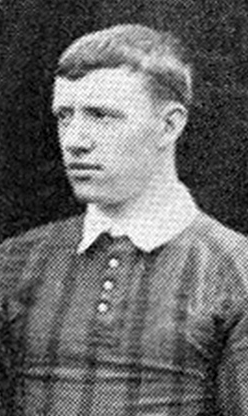
Signed from Darwen during the 1904 off-season, Jimmy Tomlinson would go on to be a mainstay at centre half until his departure in 1908.

It was a summer of fundraising for the Brentford board during the 1904 off-season, with the club needing to raise money for the work being undertaken at its new Griffin Park ground. £600 was raised (equivalent to £81,700 in 2023) to pay summer wages for the squad and manager Dick Molyneux was once again able to sign new players soon after the end of the 1903–04 season, with goalkeeper Walter Whittaker, half back Jimmy Tomlinson and forwards John Boag, Fred Hobson, Frank Oliver, Alex Walker and Joe Warrington being signings of note. Molyneux's biggest transfer coup was that of forward Tommy Shanks, who returned to Brentford after 18 months away and off the back of a season in which he had scored 25 goals in Woolwich Arsenal's Football League Second Division triumph. The summer wages allowed full backs Jock Watson, Tommy Davidson and half backs James Bellingham, Jimmy Jay and George Parsonage to be retained, which on paper made the Bees' 1904–05 Southern League First Division squad arguably the club's strongest yet.

Though the season proved to be a slight improvement on the previous one, with two more points won, but finishing one place lower in 14th, Brentford's first season at Griffin Park was a disappointment. Though he finished the season as top scorer and became Brentford's second international player, forward Tommy Shanks could not recreate his prolific form of the previous season and scored just seven goals. The Bees reached the intermediate round of the FA Cup for the third successive season, but could not find a way past fellow First Division club Reading.

Two club records were set during the season:

- Most Southern League draws in a season: 9
- Most Southern League home draws in a season: 7

== League table ==
Pos	Team	Pld	W	D	L	GF	GA	GR	Pts
12	Brighton & Hove Albion	34	13	6	15	44	45	0.978	32
13	Northampton Town	34	12	8	14	43	54	0.796	32
14	Brentford	34	10	9	15	33	38	0.868	29
15	Millwall	34	11	7	16	38	47	0.809	29
16	Swindon Town	34	12	5	17	41	59	0.695	29

Rules for classification: The system of using goal average to separate two teams tied on points was used up until the 1976–77 season. The points system: 2 points for a win, 1 point for a draw and 0 points for losing.

== Results ==
Brentford's goal tally listed first.

=== Legend ===
Win	Draw	Loss

=== Southern League First Division ===
No.	Date	Opponent	Venue	Result	Scorer(s)
1	3 September 1904	West Ham United	H	0–0	
2	10 September 1904	Reading	A	0–1	
3	17 September 1904	Bristol Rovers	H	0–1	
4	24 September 1904	Northampton Town	A	2–3	Warrington, Boag
5	1 October 1904	Portsmouth	H	1–3	Warrington
6	8 October 1904	Brighton & Hove Albion	A	1–0	Shanks (pen)
7	15 October 1904	Queens Park Rangers	A	2–3	Shanks, Gates
8	22 October 1904	Millwall	H	2–0	Hobson (2)
9	29 October 1904	Tottenham Hotspur	A	1–1	Shanks
10	5 November 1904	Luton Town	H	3–0	Shanks (3)
11	12 November 1904	Swindon Town	A	3–1	Oliver (2), Hobson
12	19 November 1904	New Brompton	H	0–2	
13	3 December 1904	Southampton	H	0–1	
14	17 December 1904	Watford	H	1–1	Jay
15	24 December 1904	Plymouth Argyle	A	0–1	
16	31 December 1904	West Ham United	A	1–0	Oliver
17	7 January 1905	Reading	H	0–0	
18	21 January 1905	Northampton Town	H	3–4	Jay, Fletcher (2)
19	28 January 1905	Portsmouth	A	0–5	
20	4 February 1905	Brighton & Hove Albion	H	1–0	Shinner
21	11 February 1905	Queens Park Rangers	H	0–0	
22	18 February 1905	Millwall	A	1–1	Parsonage
23	25 February 1905	Tottenham Hotspur	H	0–0	
24	4 March 1905	Luton Town	A	0–1	
25	11 March 1905	Swindon Town	H	1–1	Warrington
26	18 March 1905	New Brompton	A	1–0	Gates
27	25 March 1905	Wellingborough	H	3–0	Parsonage, Fletcher, Warrington
28	27 March 1905	Wellingborough	A	4–0	Hobson (3), Shinner
29	1 April 1905	Southampton	A	0–2	
30	8 April 1905	Fulham	H	1–1	Gates
31	15 April 1905	Watford	A	0–1	
32	22 April 1905	Plymouth Argyle	H	1–0	Shanks (pen)
33	25 April 1905	Bristol Rovers	A	0–3	
34	29 April 1905	Fulham	A	0–1	

=== FA Cup ===
Round	Date	Opponent	Venue	Result	Scorer(s)
6QR	10 December 1904	Queens Park Rangers	A	2–1	Archer (og), Swarbrick
IR	14 January 1905	Reading	H	1–1	Warrington
IR (replay)	18 January 1905	Reading	A	0–2	

- Source: 100 Years of Brentford

== Playing squad ==
Note: Flags indicate national team as defined under FIFA eligibility rules; some limited exceptions apply. Players may hold more than one non-FIFA nationality.

Pos.	Nation	Player
GK	USA	William McBride
GK	ENG	Walter Whittaker
DF	SCO	Tommy Davidson
DF	ENG	Thomas Howarth
DF	SCO	Jock Watson
MF	SCO	James Bellingham
MF	SCO	Jimmy Jay
MF	ENG	George Parsonage (c)
MF	ENG	Jimmy Tomlinson
FW	SCO	John Boag
FW	ENG	Chris Duffy

Pos.	Nation	Player
FW	ENG	Harry Fletcher
FW	ENG	George Gates
FW	ENG	Fred Hobson
FW	ENG	John Moulder
FW	ENG	Frank Oliver
FW	IRL	Tommy Shanks
FW	ENG	James Shinner
FW	ENG	James Swarbrick
FW	ENG	Tosher Underwood
FW	SCO	Alex Walker
FW	ENG	Joe Warrington

- Source: 100 Years of Brentford

== Coaching staff ==
Name	Role
(England) Dick Molyneux	Secretary Manager
(Ireland) Bob Crone	Trainer

== Statistics ==
=== Appearances ===

Brentford's highest appearance-makers in each position during the Southern League season.

=== Goalscorers ===
Pos.	Nat	Player	SL1	FAC	Total
FW	(Ireland)	Tommy Shanks	7	0	7
FW	(England)	Fred Hobson	6	0	6
HB	(England)	Joe Warrington	4	1	5
FW	(England)	Harry Fletcher	3	0	3
FW	(England)	George Gates	3	0	3
FW	(England)	Frank Oliver	3	0	3
FW	(England)	James Shinner	2	—	2
HB	(England)	Jimmy Jay	2	0	2
HB	(England)	George Parsonage	2	0	2
FW	(Scotland)	John Boag	1	0	1
FW	(England)	James Swarbrick	0	1	1
Opponents			0	1	1
Total			33	3	36

- Players listed in italics left the club mid-season.
- Source: 100 Years Of Brentford

=== International caps ===
Pos.	Nat	Player	Caps	Goals	Ref
FW	(Ireland)	Tommy Shanks	1	0	

=== Management ===
Name	Nat	From	To	Record All Comps					Record League				
Name	Nat	From	To	P	W	D	L	W %	P	W	D	L	W %
Dick Molyneux	(England)	3 September 1904	29 April 1905	37	11	10	16	29.73	34	10	9	15	29.41

=== Summary ===
Games played	37 (34 Southern League First Division, 3 FA Cup)
Games won	11 (10 Southern League First Division, 1 FA Cup)
Games drawn	10 (9 Southern League First Division, 1 FA Cup)
Games lost	16 (15 Southern League First Division, 1 FA Cup)
Goals scored	36 (33 Southern League First Division, 3 FA Cup)
Goals conceded	42 (38 Southern League First Division, 4 FA Cup)
Clean sheets	13 (13 Southern League First Division, 0 FA Cup)
Biggest league win	4–0 versus Wellingborough, 27 March 1905
Worst league defeat	5–0 versus Portsmouth, 28 January 1905
Most appearances	37, George Parsonage (34 Southern League First Division, 3 FA Cup)
Top scorer (league)	7, Tommy Shanks
Top scorer (all competitions)	7, Tommy Shanks
