= 1907–08 Brentford F.C. season =

English football team season

Brentford
1907–08 season
- Chairman: Charlie Dorey
- Secretary Manager: William Brown (until January 1908); George Parsonage (from January 1908)
- Stadium: Griffin Park
- Southern League First Division: 16th
- FA Cup: First round
- Top goalscorer: League: Bowman (21); All: Bowman (22)
Home colours

During the 1907–08 English football season, Brentford competed in the Southern League First Division. A poor season ended with a 16th-place finish.

== Season summary ==
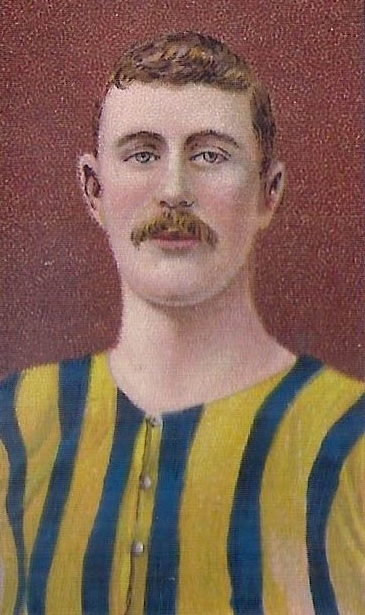
Captain George Parsonage was named as player-caretaker manager in January 1908.

Though Brentford manager William Brown managed to retain most of his key players for the 1907–08 season, his release of future England international forward Fred Pentland was seen as being ill-advised. In came goalkeeper John Montgomery, full back Vince Hayes, half back Jock Hamilton and centre forward Adam Bowman. Brentford started the Southern League First Division season poorly and with the club entering a period of financial instability, the relationship between the committee and the players began to deteriorate. Hopes of a money-spinning FA Cup run ended in the first round at the hands of Lancashire Combination club Carlisle United and in January 1908 manager Brown tendered his resignation, which was accepted.

Captain George Parsonage was named as player-caretaker manager in January 1908 and after reshuffling the lineup, he oversaw an upturn in form which led the Bees to a 16th-place finish. One of the highlights of a dreadful season was the goalscoring of forward Adam Bowman, who scored 22 goals in all competitions before being sold to Leeds City for £300 in April. There was some cheer to be had in the United League, in which the first team won the division title, while the reserve team finished the season as Great Western Suburban League champions.

The season marked a beginning of a period of financial trouble for Brentford, with Fulham's election to the Football League and Chelsea's home fixtures clashing with those at Griffin Park conspiring to draw potential support in West London away from the Bees. By mid-April 1908, the club owed its players £500 in unpaid wages (equivalent to £52,000 in 2025), which necessitated the sale of top-scorer Bowman.

One club record was set during the season:

- Most Southern League away defeats in a season: 16

== League table ==
Pos	Team	Pld	W	D	L	GF	GA	GR	Pts
14	Watford	38	12	10	16	47	59	0.797	34
15	Norwich City	38	12	9	17	46	49	0.939	33
16	Brentford	38	14	5	19	49	53	0.925	33
17	Brighton & Hove Albion	38	12	8	18	46	59	0.780	32
18	Luton Town	38	12	6	20	33	56	0.589	30

Rules for classification: The system of using goal average to separate two teams tied on points was used until the 1976-77 season. The points system: 2 points for a win, 1 point for a draw and 0 points for losing.

== Results ==
Brentford's goal tally listed first.

=== Legend ===
Win	Draw	Loss

=== Southern League First Division ===
No.	Date	Opponent	Venue	Result	Scorer(s)
1	3 September 1907	Leyton	A	0–2	
2	7 September 1907	Bristol Rovers	A	0–3	
3	14 September 1907	Leyton	H	2–0	Hagan, Parsonage
4	21 September 1907	Reading	A	1–5	Bowman
5	28 September 1907	Watford	H	4–1	Bowman (2), Corbett (2)
6	5 October 1907	Norwich City	A	2–3	Bowman (2)
7	12 October 1907	Northampton Town	H	3–1	Bowman (3)
8	19 October 1907	Southampton	A	0–3	
9	26 October 1907	Plymouth Argyle	H	2–1	Parsonage, Corbett
10	2 November 1907	West Ham United	A	1–5	Hagan (pen)
11	9 November 1907	Queens Park Rangers	H	1–1	Hagan (pen)
12	16 November 1907	Tottenham Hotspur	A	0–1	
13	23 November 1907	Swindon Town	H	2–0	Corbett, Hagan
14	30 November 1907	Crystal Palace	A	1–2	McAllister
15	7 December 1907	Luton Town	H	3–1	Underwood, Bowman (2)
16	14 December 1907	Brighton & Hove Albion	A	0–1	
17	21 December 1907	Portsmouth	H	1–1	Corbett
18	25 December 1907	Millwall	H	1–2	Corbett
19	26 December 1907	New Brompton	A	1–2	Bowman
20	28 December 1907	Bradford Park Avenue	A	0–2	
21	4 January 1908	Bristol Rovers	H	0–3	
22	18 January 1908	Reading	H	1–0	Parsonage
23	25 January 1908	Watford	A	2–1	Corbett, Bowman
24	8 February 1908	Northampton Town	A	0–0	
25	15 February 1908	Southampton	H	4–0	Corbett, Bowman (2), Underwood
26	22 February 1908	Plymouth Argyle	A	1–2	Black (og)
27	29 February 1908	West Ham United	H	4–0	Bowman (2), Corbett, Parsonage
28	7 March 1908	Queens Park Rangers	A	0–1	
29	9 March 1908	Norwich City	H	2–1	Bowman, Brown
30	14 March 1908	Tottenham Hotspur	H	3–0	Bowman (3)
31	21 March 1908	Swindon Town	A	0–0	
32	28 March 1908	Crystal Palace	H	1–1	Corbett
33	4 April 1908	Luton Town	A	0–1	
34	11 April 1908	Brighton & Hove Albion	H	2–0	Underwood, Bowman
35	17 April 1908	Millwall	A	0–2	
36	18 April 1908	Portsmouth	A	2–3	Underwood, Tomlinson
37	20 April 1908	New Brompton	H	1–0	Corbett
38	25 April 1908	Bradford Park Avenue	H	1–2	Underwood

=== FA Cup ===
Round	Date	Opponent	Venue	Result	Scorer(s)
1R	11 January 1908	Carlisle United	A	2–2	Bowman, Corbett
1R (replay)	15 January 1908	Carlisle United	H	1–3 (a.e.t.)	Tomlinson

- Source: 100 Years of Brentford

== Playing squad ==
Note: Flags indicate national team as defined under FIFA eligibility rules; some limited exceptions apply. Players may hold more than one non-FIFA nationality.

Pos.	Nation	Player
GK	SCO	John Montgomery
GK	ENG	Charlie Williams
DF	ENG	Raymond Abbott
DF	SCO	Andy Clark
DF	ENG	Vince Hayes
DF	SCO	Jock Watson
MF	ENG	Albert Bull
MF	SCO	Jock Hamilton
MF	ENG	Jimmy Jay

Pos.	Nation	Player
MF	ENG	George Parsonage (c)
MF	ENG	Jimmy Tomlinson
FW	ENG	Norman Brown
FW	ENG	Fred Corbett
FW	ENG	Patsy Hendren
FW	ENG	James Lloyd-Evans
FW	SCO	Tom McAllister
FW	ENG	Lindsay Syrad
FW	ENG	Tosher Underwood

=== Left club during season ===
Note: Flags indicate national team as defined under FIFA eligibility rules; some limited exceptions apply. Players may hold more than one non-FIFA nationality.

Pos. / Nation / Player; FW / SCO / Adam Bowman (to Leeds City)	Pos. / Nation / Player; FW / SCO / Patrick Hagan (to Hibernian)

- Source: 100 Years of Brentford, The Football Association

== Coaching staff ==
=== William Brown (3 September 1907 – January 1908) ===
Name	Role
(England) William Brown	Secretary Manager
(Ireland) Bob Crone	Trainer

=== George Parsonage ( – 25 January April 1908) ===
Name	Role
(England) George Parsonage	Caretaker Manager
(Ireland) Bob Crone	Trainer

== Statistics ==
=== Appearances ===

Brentford's highest appearance-makers in each position during the Southern League season.

=== Goalscorers ===
Pos.	Nat	Player	SL1	FAC	Total
FW	(Scotland)	Adam Bowman	21	1	22
FW	(England)	Fred Corbett	11	1	12
FW	(England)	Tosher Underwood	5	0	5
FW	(Scotland)	Patrick Hagan	4	0	4
HB	(England)	George Parsonage	4	0	4
HB	(England)	Jimmy Tomlinson	1	1	2
FW	(England)	Norman Brown	1	0	1
FW	(Scotland)	Tom McAllister	1	0	1
Opponents			1	0	1
Total			49	3	52

- Players listed in italics left the club mid-season.
- Source: 100 Years Of Brentford

=== Summary ===
Games played	40 (38 Southern League First Division, 2 FA Cup)
Games won	14 (14 Southern League First Division, 0 FA Cup)
Games drawn	6 (5 Southern League First Division, 1 FA Cup)
Games lost	20 (19 Southern League First Division, 1 FA Cup)
Goals scored	52 (49 Southern League First Division, 3 FA Cup)
Goals conceded	58 (53 Southern League First Division, 5 FA Cup)
Clean sheets	10 (10 Southern League First Division, 0 FA Cup)
Biggest league win	4–0 on two occasions
Worst league defeat	5–1 on two occasions
Most appearances	40, George Parsonage (38 Southern League First Division, 2 FA Cup)
Top scorer (league)	21, Adam Bowman
Top scorer (all competitions)	22, Adam Bowman
