= 1905–06 Brentford F.C. season =

English football team season

Brentford
1905–06 season
- Chairman: Charlie Dorey
- Secretary Manager: Dick Molyneux (until January 1906); Bob Crone (January – February 1906); William Brown (from February 1906)
- Stadium: Griffin Park
- Southern League First Division: 9th
- FA Cup: Third round
- Top goalscorer: League: Corbett (11); All: Corbett (15)
Home colours

During the 1905–06 English football season, Brentford competed in the Southern League First Division. The mid-table season is best-remembered for the Bees' appearance in the FA Cup proper for the first time in club history. After victories over Football League Second Division clubs Bristol City and Lincoln City in the first and second rounds respectively, Brentford were defeated in the third round by top-flight club Liverpool at Anfield.

== Season summary ==
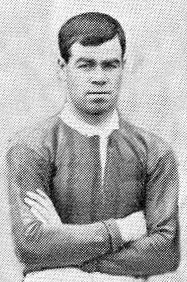
New forward signing Fred Corbett was a hit at Griffin Park during the season, top-scoring with 15 goals.

After two successive mid-table seasons in the Southern League First Division and some positive showings in the FA Cup, Brentford manager Dick Molyneux was able to keep the majority of his full back and half back lines together for the 1905–06 season. He brought goalkeeper Tommy Spicer back from Leyton as cover for Walter Whittaker and cleared out the forward line, making six new additions, with five of the players possessing Football League experience – Walter Cookson, Fred Corbett, Willie Cross, Jack Dewhurst and Jimmy Hartley.

Three wins in the first four matches of the season put lifted Brentford high in the First Division table, but injury to Fred Corbett and the departure of Jack Dewhurst dropped the club back after successive defeats in late September and early October 1905. Molyneux re-signed forward Fred Hobson as a replacement for Dewhurst and together with fit-again Fred Corbett, the pair began to score regularly. Brentford's FA Cup campaign got underway in early December with a 4–0 fourth qualifying round victory over Southern League Second Division strugglers Wycombe Wanderers, a result which put Brentford in the first round proper of the FA Cup for the first time in the club's history. Brentford were drawn against Football League Second Division high-flyers Bristol City at Griffin Park and came back from a goal down to emerge 2–1 victors, with former City player Fred Corbett scoring both the Bees' goals. The best result in the club's history so far was achieved without manager Dick Molyneux, who was confined to his home with a serious illness.

In manager Molyneux's absence, trainer Bob Crone took over the day-to-day running of the team and the FA Cup second round draw produced a home tie versus Second Division club Lincoln City on 3 February 1906, whom Brentford swept aside 3–0 to go into the hat for the third round. Though the still-seriously ill Molyneux had not left the club, he was replaced by William Brown in mid-February, who took charge of Brentford's FA Cup third round tie at Anfield. After a week of hard training on Southport beach, the Bees produced a creditable performance in a 2–0 defeat and finally received national attention. The end of the cup run left Brentford with the league season to play out and despite never falling below 7th position between December and mid-April, five defeats from the final six matches dropped the club to a 9th-place finish. Former manager Dick Molyneux's contract was cancelled in May and he returned to Liverpool, where he died shortly after.

== League table ==
Pos	Team	Pld	W	D	L	GF	GA	GR	Pts
7	Norwich City	34	13	10	11	46	38	1.211	36
8	Bristol Rovers	34	15	5	14	56	56	1.000	35
9	Brentford	34	14	7	13	43	52	0.827	35
10	Reading	34	12	9	13	53	46	1.152	33
11	West Ham United	34	14	5	15	42	39	1.077	33

Rules for classification: The system of using goal average to separate two teams tied on points was used until the 1976-77 season. The points system: 2 points for a win, 1 point for a draw and 0 points for losing.

== Results ==
Brentford's goal tally listed first.

=== Legend ===
Win	Draw	Loss

=== Southern League First Division ===
No.	Date	Opponent	Venue	Result	Scorer(s)
1	2 September 1905	Southampton	A	1–0	Underwood
2	9 September 1905	Reading	H	2–1	Shanks (pen), Underwood
3	16 September 1905	Watford	A	0–1	
4	23 September 1905	Brighton & Hove Albion	H	2–0	Shanks, Hartley
5	30 September 1905	West Ham United	A	0–2	
6	7 October 1905	Fulham	H	0–2	
7	14 October 1905	Queens Park Rangers	A	2–1	Corbett, Underwood
8	21 October 1905	Bristol Rovers	H	1–0	Cross
9	28 October 1905	New Brompton	A	1–2	Corbett
10	4 November 1905	Portsmouth	H	1–1	Parsonage
11	11 November 1905	Swindon Town	A	1–1	Hobson
12	18 November 1905	Millwall	H	1–1	Corbett
13	25 November 1905	Luton Town	A	2–0	Hobson, Corbett
14	2 December 1905	Tottenham Hotspur	H	0–3	
15	16 December 1905	Norwich City	A	1–1	Hartley
16	23 December 1905	Plymouth Argyle	H	1–0	Underwood
17	30 December 1905	Southampton	H	2–1	Hartley, Corbett
18	6 January 1906	Reading	A	2–2	Corbett, Hartley
19	20 January 1906	Watford	H	3–0	McCartney (og), Shanks, Jay
20	27 January 1906	Brighton & Hove Albion	A	2–3	Shanks, Corbett
21	10 February 1906	Fulham	A	0–2	
22	17 February 1906	Queens Park Rangers	H	2–2	Greaves, Hartley
23	3 March 1906	New Brompton	H	3–2	Shanks (2, 1 pen), Greaves
24	10 March 1906	Portsmouth	A	0–5	
25	12 March 1906	Northampton Town	H	2–1	Corbett, Hobson
26	17 March 1906	Swindon Town	H	3–1	Corbett, Shanks (2)
27	24 March 1906	Millwall	A	1–1	Underwood
28	31 March 1906	Luton Town	H	2–1	Corbett (2)
29	7 April 1906	Tottenham Hotspur	A	1–4	Shanks
30	14 April 1906	Northampton Town	A	0–4	
31	21 April 1906	Norwich City	H	0–2	
32	23 April 1906	West Ham United	H	3–1	Shanks, Hobson (2)
33	28 April 1906	Plymouth Argyle	A	0–2	
34	30 April 1906	Bristol Rovers	A	1–2	Greaves

=== FA Cup ===
Round	Date	Opponent	Venue	Result	Scorer(s)
4QR	9 December 1905	Wycombe Wanderers	H	4–0	Corbett, Hobson, Hartley, Shanks
1R	13 January 1906	Bristol City	H	2–1	Corbett (2)
2R	3 February 1906	Lincoln City	H	3–0	Parsonage, Underwood, Corbett
3R	24 February 1906	Liverpool	A	0–2	

- Source: 100 Years of Brentford

== Playing squad ==
Note: Flags indicate national team as defined under FIFA eligibility rules; some limited exceptions apply. Players may hold more than one non-FIFA nationality.

Pos.	Nation	Player
GK	ENG	Tommy Spicer
GK	ENG	Walter Whittaker
DF	SCO	James Bellingham
DF	ENG	Thomas Howarth
DF	SCO	Jock Watson
MF	ENG	George Gates
MF	ENG	Joshua Hardisty
MF	ENG	Jimmy Jay
MF	ENG	George Parsonage (c)
MF	ENG	Harry Robotham

Pos.	Nation	Player
MF	ENG	Jimmy Tomlinson
FW	ENG	Walter Cookson
FW	ENG	Fred Corbett
FW	SCO	Willie Cross
FW	ENG	David Greaves
FW	SCO	Jimmy Hartley
FW	ENG	Fred Hobson
FW	IRL	Tommy Shanks
FW	ENG	Tosher Underwood

=== Left club during season ===
Note: Flags indicate national team as defined under FIFA eligibility rules; some limited exceptions apply. Players may hold more than one non-FIFA nationality.

Pos. / Nation / Player; DF / ENG / Tom Riley (to Aston Villa)	Pos. / Nation / Player; FW / ENG / Jack Dewhurst (to Bury)

- Source: 100 Years of Brentford

== Coaching staff ==
=== Dick Molyneux (2 September 1905 – January 1906) ===
Name	Role
(England) Dick Molyneux	Secretary Manager
(Ireland) Bob Crone	Trainer

=== Bob Crone (January – February 1906) ===
Name	Role
(Ireland) Bob Crone	Caretaker Manager

=== William Brown (February – 30 April 1906) ===
Name	Role
(England) William Brown	Secretary Manager
(Ireland) Bob Crone	Trainer

== Statistics ==
=== Appearances ===

Brentford's highest appearance-makers in each position during the Southern League season.

=== Goalscorers ===
Pos.	Nat	Player	SL1	FAC	Total
FW	(England)	Fred Corbett	11	4	15
FW	(Ireland)	Tommy Shanks	10	1	11
FW	(Scotland)	Jimmy Hartley	5	1	6
FW	(England)	Fred Hobson	5	1	6
FW	(England)	Tosher Underwood	5	1	6
FW	(England)	David Greaves	3	0	3
HB	(England)	George Parsonage	1	1	2
FW	(Scotland)	Willie Cross	1	0	1
HB	(England)	Jimmy Jay	1	0	1
Opponents			1	0	1
Total			43	9	52

- Players listed in italics left the club mid-season.
- Source: 100 Years Of Brentford

=== Summary ===
Games played	38 (34 Southern League First Division, 4 FA Cup)
Games won	17 (14 Southern League First Division, 3 FA Cup)
Games drawn	7 (7 Southern League First Division, 0 FA Cup)
Games lost	14 (13 Southern League First Division, 1 FA Cup)
Goals scored	42 (33 Southern League First Division, 9 FA Cup)
Goals conceded	46 (43 Southern League First Division, 3 FA Cup)
Clean sheets	8 (6 Southern League First Division, 2 FA Cup)
Biggest league win	3–0 versus Watford, 20 January 1906
Worst league defeat	5–0 versus Portsmouth, 10 March 1906
Most appearances	38, Tosher Underwood (34 Southern League First Division, 4 FA Cup)
Top scorer (league)	11, Fred Corbett
Top scorer (all competitions)	15, Fred Corbett
