= List of Swansea City A.F.C. managers =

This is a list of Swansea City A.F.C. managers and their records from 1912, when the club was founded and their first professional manager appointed, to the present day.

== History ==
The first manager to be appointed to Swansea Town was Walter Whittaker. In the club's first season, Whittaker led Swansea to their first Welsh Cup win. Haydn Green is Swansea's longest serving manager, having held the position for 8 years, 123 days spanning World War II. Statistically, Roberto Martínez is Swansea's most successful manager with a 50% winning percentage in all competitive games. As a player-manager, John Toshack guided Swansea City to three promotions in four years, from the Fourth Division to the First Division. Swansea finished the 1981–81 season in sixth place – their highest ever league position. There have been three managers hired on a 'permanent' basis (Kevin Cullis, Jimmy Rimmer and Micky Adams) who had winless records during their brief stints at Swansea that spanned less than four weeks between all three of them, in two separate periods of 1996 and 1997.

== List of managers ==
This list of all managers includes performance records and honours.
P = Matches played; W = Matches won; D = Matches drawn; L = Matches lost

Picture	Name	Nationality	From	To	Length	P	W	D	L	Win%	Honours	Ref.
	Walter Whittaker	England	1 August 1912	31 May 1914	1 year, 303 days	2	1	0	1	50.00	1 Welsh Cup	
	William Bartlett	England	1 August 1914	31 May 1915	303 days	3	1	1	1	33.33		
	Joe Bradshaw	England	1 August 1919	1 May 1926	6 years, 273 days	272	128	73	71	47.06	1 Third Division South Championship	
	Jimmy Thomson	Scotland	4 April 1927	31 May 1931	4 years, 119 days	176	59	43	74	33.52		
	Neil Harris	Scotland	1 July 1934	1 May 1939	4 years, 304 days	218	71	49	98	32.57		
	Haydn Green	England	1 May 1939	1 September 1947	8 years, 123 days	50	13	9	28	26.00		
	Billy McCandless	Northern Ireland	1 November 1948	1 July 1955	6 years, 242 days	294	113	61	120	38.44	1 Third Division South Championship, 1 Welsh Cup	
	Ronnie Burgess	Wales	1 July 1955	1 August 1958	3 years, 31 days	129	50	22	57	38.76		
	Trevor Morris	Wales	1 August 1958	31 May 1965	6 years, 303 days	327	112	77	138	34.25	1 Welsh Cup	
	Glyn Davies	Wales	1 June 1965	1 October 1966	1 year, 122 days	58	16	15	27	27.59	1 Welsh Cup	
	Billy Lucas	Wales	1 February 1967	1 March 1969	2 years, 28 days	97	34	24	39	35.05		
	Roy Bentley	England	1 August 1969	16 October 1972	3 years, 76 days	153	56	45	52	36.60	1 Fourth Division promotion	
	Harry Gregg	Northern Ireland	1 November 1972	1 January 1975	2 years, 61 days	101	34	23	44	33.66		
	Harry Griffiths	Wales	1 January 1975	29 October 1977	2 years, 301 days	127	54	28	45	42.52		
	Harry Griffiths	Wales	22 November 1977	1 February 1978	71 days	9	4	2	3	44.44		
	John Toshack (Note: Player-manager)	Wales	1 February 1978	29 October 1983	5 years, 89 days	251	104	59	88	41.43	1 Fourth Division promotion, 1 Third Division promotion, 1 Second Division promotion, 3 Welsh Cups	
	Doug Livermore (Note: Caretaker manager)	England	29 October 1983	21 December 1983	53 days	9	1	1	7	11.11		
	John Toshack	Wales	21 December 1983	4 March 1984	74 days	11	2	3	6	18.18		
	Les Chappell	England	4 March 1984	16 May 1984	73 days	12	3	2	7	25.00		
	Colin Appleton	England	16 May 1984	6 December 1984	204 days	22	4	3	15	18.18		
	Les Chappell	England	6 December 1984	16 December 1984	10 days	1	0	1	0	0.00		
	John Bond	England	16 December 1984	20 December 1985	1 year, 4 days	54	15	11	28	27.78		
	Tommy Hutchison	Scotland	21 December 1985	1 May 1986	131 days	23	6	7	10	26.09		
	Terry Yorath	Wales	12 July 1986	2 February 1989	2 years, 205 days	139	58	35	46	41.73	1 Fourth Division play-off winner	
	Ian Evans	Wales	27 February 1989	13 March 1990	1 year, 14 days	58	15	19	24	25.86	1 Welsh Cup	
	Terry Yorath	Wales	15 March 1990	21 March 1991	1 year, 6 days	51	15	10	26	29.41		
	Frank Burrows	Scotland	21 March 1991	31 July 1995	4 years, 132 days	231	85	65	81	36.80	1 Welsh Cup, 1 Football League Trophy	
	Bobby Smith	England	1 August 1995	31 July 1996	365 days	49	12	14	23	24.49		
	Kevin Cullis	England	8 February 1996	14 February 1996	6 days	2	0	0	2	0.00		
	Jimmy Rimmer	England	14 February 1996	22 February 1996	8 days	2	0	1	1	0.00		
	Jan Mølby	Denmark	22 February 1996	8 October 1997	1 year, 228 days	80	31	16	33	38.75		
	Micky Adams	England	9 October 1997	22 October 1997	13 days	3	0	0	3	0.00		
	Alan Cork	England	22 October 1997	30 June 1998	251 days	35	10	10	15	28.57		
	John Hollins	England	1 July 1998	12 September 2001	3 years, 73 days	170	63	47	60	37.06	1 Third Division Championship	
	Colin Addison	England	13 September 2001	7 March 2002	175 days	35	11	8	16	31.43		
	Roger Freestone (Note: Freestone and Cusack were appointed as co-player-managers.)	Wales	8 March 2002	20 April 2002	43 days	8	1	2	5	12.50		
	Nick Cusack	England	8 March 2002	19 September 2002	195 days	8	2	5	1	25.00		
	Brian Flynn	Wales	19 September 2002	18 March 2004	1 year, 181 days	82	28	22	32	34.15		
	Alan Curtis	Wales	18 March 2004	5 April 2004	18 days	4	1	1	2	25.00		
	Kenny Jackett	England	5 April 2004	15 February 2007	2 years, 316 days	156	69	40	47	44.23	1 League Two promotion, 1 Football League Trophy	
	Kevin Nugent	England	15 February 2007	24 February 2007	9 days	3	0	1	2	0.00		
	Roberto Martínez	Spain	24 February 2007	15 June 2009	2 years, 111 days	126	63	37	26	50.00	1 League One Championship	
	Paulo Sousa	Portugal	22 June 2009	5 July 2010	1 year, 13 days	49	18	18	13	36.73		
	Brendan Rodgers	Northern Ireland	16 July 2010	1 June 2012	1 year, 321 days	96	43	20	33	44.79	1 Championship play-off winner	
	Michael Laudrup	Denmark	17 June 2012	4 February 2014	1 year, 232 days	84	29	24	31	34.52	1 Football League Cup	
	Garry Monk	England	4 February 2014	9 December 2015	1 year, 308 days	77	28	17	32	36.36		
	Alan Curtis	Wales	9 December 2015	18 January 2016	40 days	8	2	2	4	25.00		
	Francesco Guidolin	Italy	18 January 2016	3 October 2016	259 days	25	9	5	11	36.00		
	Bob Bradley	United States	3 October 2016	27 December 2016	85 days	11	2	2	7	18.18		
	Alan Curtis	Wales	27 December 2016	3 January 2017	7 days	2	1	0	1	50.00		
	Paul Clement	England	3 January 2017	20 December 2017	351 days	37	12	5	20	32.43		
	Leon Britton	England	21 December 2017	28 December 2017	7 days	2	0	1	1	0.00		
	Carlos Carvalhal	Portugal	28 December 2017	18 May 2018	141 days	24	8	8	8	33.33		
	Graham Potter	England	11 June 2018	20 May 2019	343 days	51	21	11	19	41.18		
	Steve Cooper	Wales	13 June 2019	21 July 2021	2 years, 38 days	105	47	28	30	44.76		
	Russell Martin	Scotland	1 August 2021	21 June 2023	1 year, 324 days	99	36	26	37	36.36		
	Michael Duff	Northern Ireland	22 June 2023	4 December 2023	165 days	21	6	6	9	28.57		
	Alan Sheehan	Ireland	4 December 2023	5 January 2024	32 days	7	3	2	2	42.86		
	Luke Williams	England	5 January 2024	17 February 2025	1 year, 43 days	58	19	11	28	32.76		
	Alan Sheehan	Ireland	17 February 2025	11 November 2025	267 days	32	13	9	10	40.63		
	Darren O'Dea	Ireland	11 November 2025	24 November 2025	13 days	1	0	0	1	0.00		
	Vítor Matos	Portugal	24 November 2025	18 November 2026	359 days	26	11	4	11	42.31		
