= Alex McCulloch =

Alex McCulloch may refer to:

- Alexander McCulloch (1887–1951), British rower
- Alex McCulloch (footballer) (1887–1962), Scottish footballer
