= Willie Newbigging =

Scottish association football player

Personal information
- Full name: William Menzies Newbigging
- Date of birth: 27 December 1874
- Place of birth: Larkhall, Lanarkshire, Scotland
- Date of death: 16 October 1954 (aged 79)
- Place of death: Douglas, Lanarkshire, Scotland
- Position: Centre forward

Senior career*
| Years | Team | Apps | (Gls) |
- Lanark County
| 1896–1897 | Tottenham Hotspur | 21 | (6) |
| 1898 | Motherwell | | |
| 1898 | Folkestone | | |
| 1900 | Fulham | 5 | (0) |
| 1900 | Queens Park Rangers (Note: His involvement with Queens Park Rangers is doubtful: the QPRnet website lists one Newbigging – Alex, i.e. Willie's brother Sandy – at the club in 1900–01, playing outfield. Sandy was usually a goalkeeper, but the site also records the player as moving to Nottingham Forest, and the CityGround website makes reference to him having played outfield. Additionally, the 1901 United Kingdom census records Sandy as lodging at an address in Willesden along with QPR player James Bellingham (the same census lists Willie at home in Lanarkshire with the rest of their family).) | | |
| 1903 | Lanark County | | |
- * Club domestic league appearances and goals

William Menzies Newbigging (27 December 1874 – 16 October 1954) was a Scottish professional footballer who played for Tottenham Hotspur, Motherwell, Folkestone, Fulham and Queens Park Rangers.

== Career ==
Newbigging started his career with local club Lanark County before joining Tottenham Hotspur for the 1896–97 season when the club turned professional. His debut occurred on 5 September 1896 against Sheppey United in the Southern League Division One. He left after one season with Spurs and went on to play for Motherwell (no appearances in major competitions recorded), Folkestone, Fulham, Queens Park Rangers and then back to his hometown club. His younger brothers Sandy and Harry were also footballers.

== Career statistics ==
Appearances and goals by club, season and competition
| Club | Season | League | | | FA Cup | | Other | | Total | |
| Club | Season | Division | Apps | Goals | Apps | Goals | Apps | Goals | Apps | Goals |
|---|---|---|---|---|---|---|---|---|---|---|
| Tottenham Hotspur | 1896–97 | Southern League Division One | 10 | 2 | 3 | 3 | 3 (Note: Appearances in Wellingborough Charity Cup) | 0 | 27 | 9 |
| Tottenham Hotspur | 1896–97 | United League | 11 | 4 | 3 | 3 | 3 | 0 | 27 | 9 |
| Fulham | 1899–1900 | Southern League Division Two | 5 | 0 | — | | — | | 5 | 0 |
| Career total | | | 26 | 6 | 3 | 3 | 3 | 0 | 32 | 9 |
