= Thomas McAllister =

Thomas McAllister may refer to:

- Thomas Francis McAllister (1896–1976), United States federal judge
- Thomas Stanislaus McAllister (1878–1950), Northern Irish politician
- Tom McAllister (footballer) (1882–1951), Scottish footballer
- Tom McAllister (rugby union), Northern Irish prop for Ulster
- Tom McAllister, member of the Shotts and Dykehead Pipe Band in Scotland in the 1940s
- Tom McAllister, member of the Irish People's Liberation Organisation in the 1980s
- Red John, a fictional serial killer revealed to be Sheriff Thomas McAllister, from the TV series The Mentalist

== See also ==
- Tom McAlister (born 1952), Scottish footballer
