= George Gates =

George Gates may refer to:

- George Gates (RAF officer) (1899–?), World War I flying ace
- George Gates (footballer) (1883–1960), English footballer
- George Augustus Gates (1851–1912), American Congregational minister and university administrator
