= Jock Watson =

Scottish footballer

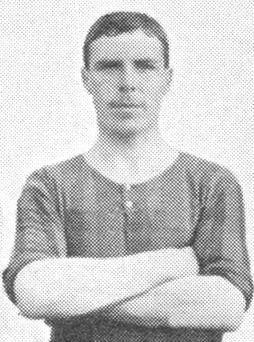
- Watson while with Brentford in 1905.

Personal information
- Full name: John Watson
- Date of birth: 28 November 1883
- Place of birth: Newarthill, Scotland
- Date of death: 6 May 1946 (aged 62)
- Place of death: Brentford, England
- Position: Full back

Senior career*
Years	Team	Apps	(Gls)
1902	Clyde	9	(0)
1902–	Newcastle United	3	(0)
- New Brompton
1903–1908	Brentford	168	(0)
1908–1910	Leeds City	45	(0)
1910	Clyde	0	(0)
- * Club domestic league appearances and goals

John Watson (28 November 1883 – 6 May 1946) was a Scottish professional footballer who made over 160 appearances as a full back in the Southern League for Brentford. He also played in the Football League for Newcastle United and Leeds City.

== Playing career ==
A full back, Watson began his career in his native Scotland at Scottish League Division Two club Clyde. He earned a £200 move to English First Division club Newcastle United in October 1902. Watson managed only three league appearances before joining Southern League First Division club New Brompton. Watson joined fellow Southern League First Division club Brentford in 1903 and made 168 appearances in a five-year spell with the club.

Along with Brentford teammates Jock Hamilton, Tom McAllister and Adam Bowman, Watson returned to the Football League to join Second Division club Leeds City in May 1908. He immediately became a fixture in the first team, being named captain, forming a full back-partnership with Jack White and making 32 appearances during the 1908–09 season. Watson began the 1909–10 season as an ever-present, but lost his place in the team and departed the club in 1910. Watson made 49 appearances for Leeds City and ended his career with a second spell at Clyde.

== Representative career ==
While in his first spell with Clyde, Watson appeared for a Glasgow Select XI against Sheffield.

== Personal life ==
After his retirement from football, Watson returned to Brentford and was the landlord of the New Inn (one of four pubs situated at the corners of Griffin Park) from July 1910 until his death in May 1946. Watson's son (also nicknamed "Jock") became a footballer and played for Ealing, Windsor and Slough in the 1930s and captained the latter club.

== Career statistics ==
Appearances and goals by club, season and competition
Club	Season	League			National Cup		Total	
Club	Season	Division	Apps	Goals	Apps	Goals	Apps	Goals
Clyde	1902–03	Scottish League Division Two	9	0	0	0	9	0
Newcastle United	1902–03	First Division	3	0	0	0	3	0
Brentford	1903–04	Southern League First Division	34	0	5	0	39	0
Brentford	1904–05	Southern League First Division	33	0	3	0	36	0
Brentford	1905–06	Southern League First Division	30	0	4	0	34	0
Brentford	1906–07	Southern League First Division	38	0	4	0	42	0
Brentford	1907–08	Southern League First Division	33	0	2	0	35	0
Brentford	Total		168	0	18	0	186	0
Leeds City	1908–09	Second Division	28	0	4	0	32	0
Leeds City	1909–10	Second Division	17	0	0	0	17	0
Leeds City	Total		45	0	4	0	49	0
Career total			225	0	22	0	247	0
