= Sandy Newbigging =

English footballer

Personal information
- Full name: Alexander Newbigging
- Date of birth: 12 September 1876
- Place of birth: Leadhills, Scotland
- Date of death: 1976 (aged 99–100)
- Place of death: West Calder, Scotland
- Position: Goalkeeper

Senior career*
Years	Team	Apps	(Gls)
1896–1897	Lanark Athletic		
1897–1900	Abercorn	22	(0)
1900	→ Lanark United (loan)		
1900–1901	Queens Park Rangers	5	(0)
1901–1905	Nottingham Forest	7	(0)
1905–1906	Reading		
1906–1908	Rangers	60	(0)
1908–1909	Reading		
1909–1910	Coventry City	8	(0)
1910	Inverness Thistle		
- * Club domestic league appearances and goals

Alexander Newbigging (12 September 1876 – 1976) was a Scottish footballer who played in the Football League for Nottingham Forest, in the Southern Football League for Queens Park Rangers, Reading (two one-season spells) and Coventry City, and in the Scottish Football League for Abercorn and Rangers. Usually a goalkeeper, he is also recorded as having played outfield as a forward. (Note: The outfield appearances referred to in the CityGround website were made at Queens Park Rangers – it is possible that the player involved in these matches was Sandy's brother Willie Newbigging who had already played for clubs in London while Sandy was already an established goalkeeper in Scotland; however the QPR site includes his first name as Alex and his next club as Nottingham Forest, and the 1901 United Kingdom census records him as lodging at an address in Willesden along with QPR player James Bellingham (the same census lists Willie at home in Lanarkshire with the rest of their family).)

His elder brother Willie and younger brother Harry were also footballers. He lived to the age of 99, and in 1973 was one of the guests of honour for Rangers' centenary events at Ibrox Park.
