= Joe Warrington =

English footballer

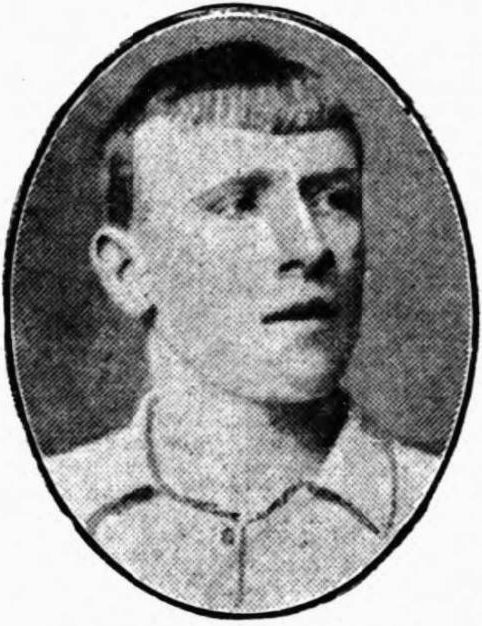
- Warrington while with Brentford 1905

Personal information
- Full name: Joseph Warrington
- Date of birth: January 1882
- Place of birth: Macclesfield, England
- Date of death: July 1924 (aged 42)
- Place of death: Macclesfield, England
- Positions: Outside right; inside left

Senior career*
Years	Team	Apps	(Gls)
–1899	Macclesfield True Blues		
1899–1900	Hallefield	7	(0)
1900–1901	Derby Wanderers		
1901–1904	Derby County	29	(7)
1904–1905	Brentford	30	(4)
1905–1906	Portsmouth	15	(3)
1906–1907	New Brompton	15	(1)
1907	Macclesfield	0	(0)
1907–1908	Chesterfield Town	20	(0)
1908–1909	Macclesfield	29	(13)
1909–1910	Hyde		
1910–1911	Macclesfield	13	(2)
1911	Leek United		
1911–1912	Congleton Town		
1912	Macclesfield	3	(0)
1913	Hurst		
- * Club domestic league appearances and goals

Joseph Warrington (January 1882 – 28 July 1924) was an English professional footballer who played as an outside right and inside left in Football League for Derby County and Chesterfield. Warrington also played in the Southern League for Brentford, Portsmouth, New Brompton and had a long association with hometown club Macclesfield.

== Career statistics ==
Appearances and goals by club, season and competition
Club	Season	League			FA Cup		Other		Total	
Club	Season	Division	Apps	Goals	Apps	Goals	Apps	Goals	Apps	Goals
Hallefield	1899–00	North Staffordshire and District League	7	0	—		0	0	7	0
Derby County	1901–02	First Division	3	0	1	0	—		4	0
Derby County	1902–03	First Division	13	3	5	3	—		18	6
Derby County	1903–04	First Division	13	4	3	1	—		16	5
Derby County	Total		29	7	9	4	—		38	11
Brentford	1904–05	Southern League First Division	30	4	3	1	—		33	5
New Brompton	1906–07	Southern League First Division	15	1	0	0	—		15	1
Chesterfield Town	1907–08	Second Division	20	0	3	0	—		23	0
Macclesfield	1908–09	Manchester League	29	13	1	0	3 (Note: Appearances in Cheshire Senior Cup)	1	33	14
Macclesfield	1910–11	Manchester League	13	2	0	0	3 (Note: 2 appearances in Altrincham Cup, 1 appearance in Cheshire Senior Cup)	0	16	2
Macclesfield	1912–13	Lancashire Combination	3	0	1	0	0	0	4	0
Macclesfield	Hallefield/Macclesfield total		52	15	2	0	6	1	60	16
Career total			146	27	8	5	6	1	160	33

== Honours ==
Macclesfield

- Manchester League: 1908–09
