= John Boag (footballer, born 1874) =

Scottish footballer

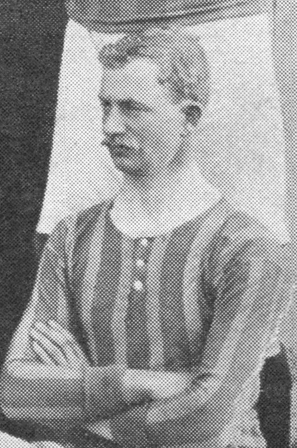
- Boag while with Brentford in 1904

Personal information
- Full name: John M. Boag
- Date of birth: 6 April 1874
- Place of birth: Glasgow, Scotland
- Date of death: 7 February 1954 (aged 79)
- Place of death: Clydebank, Scotland
- Position: Centre forward

Youth career
- Gartmore Juveniles

Senior career*
Years	Team	Apps	(Gls)
–1894	Ashfield		
1894–1895	East Stirlingshire		
1895–1896	Cowlairs	7	(2)
1896	Alloa Athletic		
1896–1904	Derby County	117	(27)
1904	Brentford	2	(0)
- * Club domestic league appearances and goals

John M. Boag (6 April 1874 – 7 February 1954) was a Scottish professional footballer, best remembered for his seven years as a centre forward in the Football League with Derby County. He also played for Cowlairs, Ashfield, East Stirlingshire and finished his career with Brentford. While with Derby County, Boag was a part of the Rams' 1898, 1899 and 1903 losing FA Cup Final sides.

== Personal life ==
After his retirement from football, Boag invested in a fishmongers, a laundrette and a snooker hall.

== Career statistics ==
Appearances and goals by club, season and competition
Club	Season	League			National Cup		Total	
Club	Season	Division	Apps	Goals	Apps	Goals	Apps	Goals
East Stirlingshire	1894–95	Midland League	0	0	1	0	1	0
Cowlairs	1895–96	Scottish League Second Division	7	2	—		7	2
Derby County	1896–97	First Division	2	0	0	0	2	0
Derby County	1897–98	First Division	14	7	3	3	17	10
Derby County	1898–99	First Division	21	6	5	3	26	9
Derby County	1899–1900	First Division	24	3	2	1	26	4
Derby County	1900–01	First Division	22	5	1	0	23	5
Derby County	1901–02	First Division	18	3	7	1	25	4
Derby County	1902–03	First Division	11	2	5	2	16	4
Derby County	1903–04	First Division	5	1	0	0	5	1
Derby County	Total		117	27	23	10	140	37
Brentford	1904–05	Southern League First Division	2	0	0	0	2	0
Career total			126	29	24	10	150	39
