= John Cross (footballer) =

Scottish footballer

Personal information
- Full name: John Halliday Cross
- Date of birth: 12 February 1881
- Place of birth: Cambusnethan, Scotland
- Date of death: 1954 (aged 72–73)
- Place of death: Cambusnethan, Scotland
- Position: Right half

Senior career*
Years	Team	Apps	(Gls)
- Wishaw Thistle
1898–1904	Third Lanark	91	(11)
1904–1905	Queens Park Rangers	21	(0)
1905–1911	Third Lanark	101	(10)
1910–1911	→ Wishaw Thistle (loan)		

International career
1903	Scotland	1	(0)
1903	Scottish League XI	1	(0)
- * Club domestic league appearances and goals

John Halliday Cross (12 February 1881 – 1954) was a Scottish professional footballer who made over 190 appearances in the Scottish League for Third Lanark over two spells, winning the league title in 1903–04 and playing in the 1906 Scottish Cup Final. He also played for Petershill, Queens Park Rangers and Wishaw Thistle and won one cap for Scotland at international level, in addition to representing the Scottish League XI. He was the brother of fellow Third Lanark and QPR footballer Willie Cross.
