= Thomas Howarth (footballer) =

English footballer

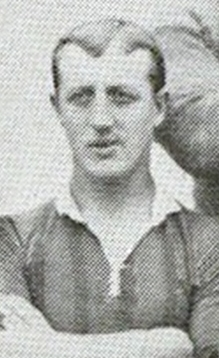
- Howarth while with Brentford 1905

Personal information
- Full name: Thomas Grimshaw Howarth
- Date of birth: 7 July 1879
- Place of birth: Nelson, England
- Date of death: 1959 (aged 79–80)
- Place of death: Ealing, England
- Position: Wing half

Senior career*
Years	Team	Apps	(Gls)
1901–1903	Burnley	9	(0)
1904–1906	Brentford	33	(0)
1906–1907	Aberdeen		
1907–1908	Shelbourne		
- * Club domestic league appearances and goals

Thomas Grimshaw Howarth (1879–1959) was an English professional footballer who played as a wing half for Burnley in the early 1900s.

== Career statistics ==
Appearances and goals by club, season and competition
Club	Season	League			FA Cup		Total	
Club	Season	Division	Apps	Goals	Apps	Goals	Apps	Goals
Brentford	1903–04	Southern League First Division	1	0	—		1	0
Brentford	1904–05	Southern League First Division	27	0	3	0	30	0
Brentford	1905–06	Southern League First Division	5	0	0	0	5	0
Career total			33	0	3	0	36	0
