= James Greechan =

Scottish footballer

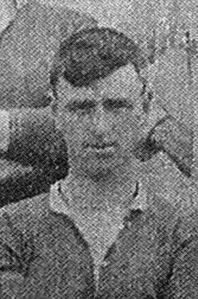
- Greechan with Brentford in 1906.

Personal information
- Full name: James Greechan
- Date of birth: 1883
- Place of birth: Glasgow, Scotland
- Date of death: 25 August 1917 (aged 33–34)
- Place of death: West Flanders, Belgium
- Position: Inside left

Senior career*
Years	Team	Apps	(Gls)
–1903	Petershill		
1903	Hibernian	4	(0)
1904	→ Broxburn Shamrock (loan)		
1905–1906	Bo'ness		
1906–1907	Brentford	12	(2)
1907–1908	Clapton Orient	30	(8)
1908–1909	Glossop	19	(3)
1909–1911	Stockport County	16	(4)
1911–1912	Albion Rovers	5	(0)
- Carlisle United
- Bathgate
- * Club domestic league appearances and goals

James Greechan (1883 – 25 August 1917) was a Scottish professional footballer who played in the Football League for Clapton Orient, Glossop and Stockport County as an inside left.

== Personal life ==
Greechan served as a private in the 12th (Service) Battalion of the Highland Light Infantry during the First World War and died of wounds suffered at the Battle of Langemarck on 25 August 1917. He was buried in Lijssenthoek Military Cemetery.

== Career statistics ==
Appearances and goals by club, season and competition
Club	Season	League			National Cup		Total	
Club	Season	Division	Apps	Goals	Apps	Goals	Apps	Goals
Hibernian	1903–04	Scottish League First Division	4	0	0	0	4	0
Brentford	1906–07	Southern League First Division	12	2	0	0	12	2
Clapton Orient	1907–08	Second Division	30	8	3	3	33	11
Stockport County	1909–10	Second Division	16	4	2	1	18	5
Albion Rovers	1911–12	Scottish League Second Division	5	0	1	0	6	0
Career total			67	14	6	4	73	18
