= Chris Duffy (footballer, born 1884) =

English footballer

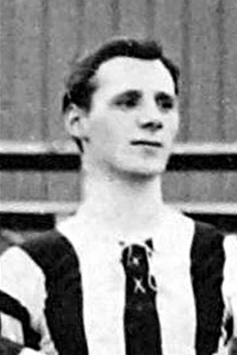
- Duffy while with Newcastle United in 1906

Personal information
- Full name: Christopher Francis Duffy
- Date of birth: 24 January 1884
- Place of birth: Jarrow, England
- Date of death: September 1971 (aged 87)
- Place of death: Northumberland, England
- Position: Outside left

Senior career*
Years	Team	Apps	(Gls)
- Jarrow
- St. Mary's College
1904–1905	Brentford	6	(0)
1905	Jarrow		
1905–1906	Middlesbrough	4	(0)
1906–1908	Newcastle United	16	(1)
1908–1915	Bury	145	(15)
1915–1916	North Shields Athletic		
1916–1917	Tyne Electrical Engineers		
1919–1920	Leicester City	4	(1)
- Chester-le-Street Town
- * Club domestic league appearances and goals

Christopher Francis Duffy (24 January 1884 – September 1971) was an English professional footballer who made over 140 appearances in the Football League for Bury. An outside left, he also played League football for Newcastle United, Leicester City, and Middlesbrough.

== Personal life ==
Duffy served in the Tyne Electrical Engineers and the Royal Garrison Artillery during the First World War. He rose to the rank of lieutenant during the course of his home service.

== Career statistics ==
Appearances and goals by club, season and competition
Club	Season	League			FA Cup		Total	
Club	Season	Division	Apps	Goals	Apps	Goals	Apps	Goals
Brentford	1904–05	Southern League First Division	6	0	0	0	6	0
Middlesbrough	1905–06	First Division	4	0	0	0	4	0
Newcastle United	1906–07	First Division	7	1	0	0	7	1
Newcastle United	1907–08	First Division	9	0	0	0	9	0
Newcastle United	Total		16	1	0	0	16	1
Bury	1908–09	First Division	35	4	0	0	35	4
Bury	1909–10	First Division	24	3	0	0	24	3
Bury	1910–11	First Division	10	0	0	0	10	0
Bury	1911–12	First Division	31	2	0	0	31	2
Bury	1914–15	Second Division	22	2	0	0	22	2
Bury	Total		122	11	0	0	122	11
Leicester City	1919–20	Second Division	4	1	0	0	4	1
Career total			152	13	0	0	152	13
