= Fred Hobson =

English footballer

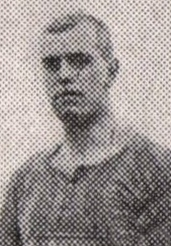
- Hobson while with Brentford in 1904

Personal information
- Full name: Alfred Thomas Hobson
- Date of birth: 1880
- Place of birth: Tipton, England
- Date of death: 21 August 1957 (aged 77)
- Place of death: Ealing, England
- Positions: Centre forward; inside right

Senior career*
Years	Team	Apps	(Gls)
- Wednesbury Old Athletic
1902–1904	West Bromwich Albion	13	(4)
1904–1906	Brentford	51	(11)
1906–1907	Crewe Alexandra		
1908–1909	Gainsborough Trinity	0	(0)
1909	Darlington		
- * Club domestic league appearances and goals

Alfred Thomas Hobson (1880–1957) was an English professional footballer who played as a centre forward and inside right in the Football League for West Bromwich Albion.

== Personal life ==
After retiring from football, Hobson joined the Metropolitan Police Service on 17 January 1910, warrant number 97844. He retired from the service on 1 April 1934.

== Career statistics ==
Appearances and goals by club, season and competition
Club	Season	League			FA Cup		Total	
Club	Season	Division	Apps	Goals	Apps	Goals	Apps	Goals
West Bromwich Albion	1902–03	First Division	1	0	0	0	1	0
West Bromwich Albion	1903–04	First Division	12	4	2	0	14	4
West Bromwich Albion	Total		13	4	2	0	15	4
Brentford	1904–05	Southern League First Division	24	6	2	0	26	6
Brentford	1905–06	Southern League First Division	27	5	3	1	30	6
Brentford	Total		51	11	5	1	56	12
Career total			64	15	7	1	71	16
