= Neve Grice =

English footballer

Personal information
- Full name: Neve Joseph Grice
- Date of birth: 4 May 1881
- Place of birth: Brentford, England
- Date of death: 21 April 1950 (aged 68)
- Place of death: Ealing, England
- Position: Outside right

Senior career*
Years	Team	Apps	(Gls)
- Ealing
1906	Woolwich Arsenal	1	(0)
1906–1907	Brentford	1	(0)
- * Club domestic league appearances and goals

Neve Joseph Grice (4 May 1881 – 21 April 1950), sometimes known as Neville Grice, was an English amateur footballer who made one appearance in the Football League for Woolwich Arsenal as an outside left.

== Personal life ==
Grice was married with a son.

== Career statistics ==
Appearances and goals by club, season and competition
Club	Season	League			FA Cup		Total	
Club	Season	Division	Apps	Goals	Apps	Goals	Apps	Goals
Woolwich Arsenal	1905–06	First Division	1	0	—		1	0
Brentford	1906–07	Southern League First Division	1	0	1	0	2	0
Career total			2	0	1	0	3	0
