= Harry Fletcher (footballer, born 1873) =

English footballer (1873–1923)

Personal information
- Full name: Henry Handley Fletcher
- Date of birth: 13 June 1873
- Place of birth: Birmingham, England
- Date of death: December 1923 (aged 50)
- Place of death: Camberwell, England
- Positions: Inside left; outside right

Senior career*
Years	Team	Apps	(Gls)
1887–1892	Albion Swifts		
1892–1898	Grimsby Town	154	(73)
1898–1900	Notts County	60	(17)
1900–1903	Grimsby Town	79	(12)
1903–1904	Fulham	40	(14)
1904–1905	Brentford	21	(3)
1905–1910	Grimsby Town	40	(7)
- RTM
- Grimsby Rangers

International career
1898	Football League XI	1	(0)
- * Club domestic league appearances and goals

Henry Handley Fletcher (13 June 1873 – December 1923) was an English professional footballer who made over 270 appearances as an inside left and outside right in the Football League for Grimsby Town. He also played League football for Notts County and made one appearance for the Football League XI.

== Career statistics ==
Appearances and goals by club, season and competition
Club	Season	League			FA Cup		Total	
Club	Season	Division	Apps	Goals	Apps	Goals	Apps	Goals
Notts County	1897–98	First Division	4	2	0	0	4	2
Notts County	1898–99	First Division	32	13	0	0	32	13
Notts County	Total		36	15	0	0	36	15
Grimsby Town	1899–1900	First Division	24	2	0	0	24	2
Grimsby Town	1900–01	First Division	20	4	0	0	20	4
Grimsby Town	1901–02	First Division	32	6	0	0	32	6
Grimsby Town	Total		76	12	0	0	76	12
Fulham	1903–04	Southern League First Division	31	13	7	5	38	18
Fulham	1904–05	Southern League First Division	9	1	—		9	1
Fulham	Total		40	14	7	5	47	19
Brentford	1904–05	Southern League First Division	21	3	2	0	23	3
Career total			173	44	9	5	182	49
