= Jack Dewhurst =

English footballer

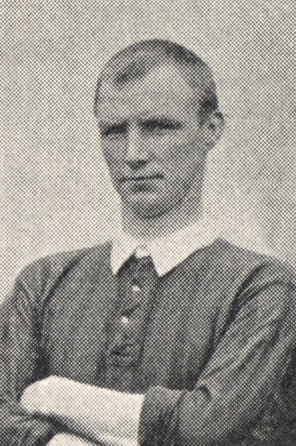
- Dewhurst with Brentford in 1905.

Personal information
- Full name: John Dewhurst
- Date of birth: 15 December 1876
- Place of birth: Padiham, England
- Date of death: 27 May 1952 (aged 75)
- Place of death: Broughton, England
- Height: 5 ft 9 in (1.75 m)
- Positions: Wing half; centre forward

Senior career*
Years	Team	Apps	(Gls)
1895–1898	Padiham		
1896	Nelson		
1898	Darwen	8	(3)
1898–1905	Blackburn Rovers	169	(43)
1905	Brentford	4	(0)
1905–1912	Bury	186	(6)
1912–1913	Accrington Stanley		
- Morecambe
- * Club domestic league appearances and goals

John Dewhurst (15 December 1876 – 27 May 1952) was an English professional footballer who made over 360 appearances in the Football League for Bury, Blackburn Rovers and Darwen as a wing half or centre forward. He also played non-League football for Padiham, Brentford, Accrington Stanley and Morecambe.

== International career ==
Dewhurst was a reserve for England's voided 1901–02 British Home Championship match versus Scotland in April 1902.

== Personal life ==
After retiring from football, Dewhurst worked as a cotton mill overlooker, a publican and a farmer.

== Career statistics ==
Appearances and goals by club, season and competition
Club	Season	League			FA Cup		Total	
Club	Season	Division	Apps	Goals	Apps	Goals	Apps	Goals
Blackburn Rovers	1899–1900	First Division	19	4	0	0	19	4
Blackburn Rovers	1900–01	First Division	26	4	0	0	26	4
Blackburn Rovers	1901–02	First Division	34	16	0	0	34	16
Blackburn Rovers	1902–03	First Division	33	6	0	0	33	6
Blackburn Rovers	1903–04	First Division	32	8	0	0	32	8
Blackburn Rovers	1904–05	First Division	25	5	0	0	25	5
Blackburn Rovers	Total		169	43	0	0	169	43
Brentford	1905–06	Southern League First Division	4	0	—		4	0
Bury	1905–06	First Division	22	2	0	0	22	2
Bury	1906–07	First Division	32	2	0	0	32	2
Bury	1907–08	First Division	35	0	0	0	35	0
Bury	1908–09	First Division	30	1	0	0	30	1
Bury	1909–10	First Division	35	1	0	0	35	1
Bury	1910–11	First Division	28	0	0	0	28	0
Bury	1912-12	First Division	4	0	0	0	4	0
Bury	Total		186	6	0	0	186	6
Career total			359	49	0	0	359	49

== Honours ==
Blackburn Rovers

- Lancashire Senior Cup: 1901–02
