= Willie Cross =

Scottish footballer (1883–1949)

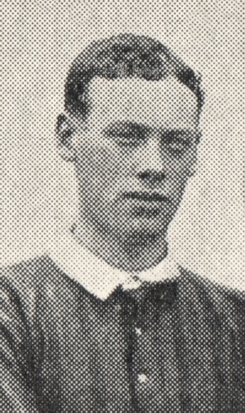
- Cross while with Brentford in 1905.

Personal information
- Full name: William Cross
- Date of birth: 17 June 1883
- Place of birth: Cambusnethan, Scotland
- Date of death: 12 April 1949 (aged 65)
- Place of death: Holytown, Scotland
- Position: Outside right

Senior career*
Years	Team	Apps	(Gls)
–1901	Cambuslang Rangers		
1901–1903	Third Lanark	12	(5)
1903–1905	Queens Park Rangers	32	(4)
1905–1906	Brentford	16	(1)
1909–1910	Third Lanark	14	(1)
1910–1911	Port Glasgow Athletic	7	(2)

International career
1904	Southern League XI	1	(0)
- * Club domestic league appearances and goals

William Cross (17 June 1883 – 12 April 1949) was a Scottish professional footballer who played as an outside forward in the Scottish League for Third Lanark and Port Glasgow Athletic. He also played for Southern League clubs Brentford and Queens Park Rangers and represented the Southern League XI.

== Personal life ==
Cross was the brother of fellow Third Lanark and Queens Park Rangers footballer John Cross.

== Career statistics ==
Appearances and goals by club, season and competition
Club	Season	League			National cup (Note: Includes Scottish Cup, FA Cup)		Other		Total	
Club	Season	Division	Apps	Goals	Apps	Goals	Apps	Goals	Apps	Goals
Third Lanark	1900–01	Scottish League First Division	0	0	0	0	3 (Note: Appearances in Glasgow Merchants Charity Cup)	0	3	0
Third Lanark	1901–02	Scottish League First Division	8	4	0	0	3 (Note: 2 appearances and 3 goals in Glasgow Cup, 1 appearance and 1 goal in Glasgow Exhibition Cup)	4	11	6
Third Lanark	1902–03	Scottish League First Division	4	1	0	0	0	0	4	1
Third Lanark	Total		12	5	0	0	6	4	18	7
Queens Park Rangers	1903–04	Southern League First Division	13	2	0	0	—		13	2
Queens Park Rangers	1904–05	Southern League First Division	19	2	1	0	—		20	2
Queens Park Rangers	Total		32	4	1	0	—		33	4
Brentford	1905–06	Southern League First Division	16	1	0	0	—		16	1
Third Lanark	1909–10	Scottish League First Division	14	1	0	0	—		14	1
Third Lanark	Total		26	6	0	0	6	4	32	6
Port Glasgow Athletic	1910–11	Scottish League Second Division	7	2	1	0	—		8	2
Career total			81	13	2	0	6	4	89	17
