= Sidney Sugden =

English footballer

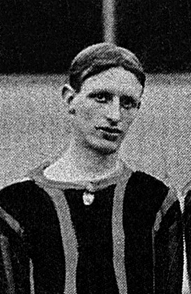
- Sugden while with Brentford in 1908.

Personal information
- Full name: Sidney Herbert Sugden
- Date of birth: 30 October 1880
- Place of birth: Battersea, England
- Date of death: 17 December 1930 (aged 50)
- Place of death: Chelsea, England
- Position: Forward

Senior career*
Years	Team	Apps	(Gls)
1901–1902	Ilford		
1902	West Ham United	1	(0)
1902–1905	Nottingham Forest	47	(16)
1905–1908	Queens Park Rangers	65	(21)
1908–1909	Brentford	30	(9)
1909–1910	Southend United		
- * Club domestic league appearances and goals

Sidney Herbert Sugden (30 October 1880 – 17 December 1930) was an English professional footballer who played as a forward in the Football League for Nottingham Forest. He also played in the Southern League for Queens Park Rangers, Brentford and West Ham United.

== Career statistics ==
Appearances and goals by club, season and competition
Club	Season	League			FA Cup		Total	
Club	Season	Division	Apps	Goals	Apps	Goals	Apps	Goals
West Ham United	1902–03	Southern League First Division	1	0	0	0	1	0
Nottingham Forest	1902–03	First Division	8	3	0	0	8	3
Nottingham Forest	1903–04	First Division	27	13	1	0	28	13
Nottingham Forest	1904–05	First Division	12	0	0	0	12	0
Nottingham Forest	Total		47	16	1	0	48	16
Queens Park Rangers	1905–06	Southern League First Division	29	8	0	0	29	8
Queens Park Rangers	1906–07	Southern League First Division	27	9	2	0	29	9
Queens Park Rangers	1907–08	Southern League First Division	9	4	1	0	11	4
Queens Park Rangers	Total		65	21	3	0	68	21
Brentford	1908–09	Southern League First Division	30	9	2	0	32	9
Career total			143	46	6	0	149	46
