= John McConnell (footballer, born 1881) =

Scottish footballer

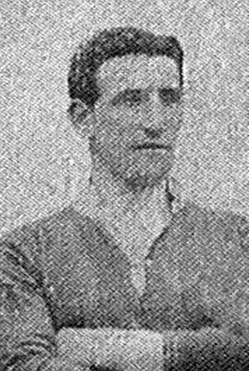
- McConnell while with Brentford in 1906

Personal information
- Full name: John McConnell
- Date of birth: 14 February 1881
- Place of birth: Dalmellington, Scotland
- Date of death: 16 March 1957 (aged 76)
- Place of death: Bradford, England
- Position: Full back

Senior career*
Years	Team	Apps	(Gls)
- Glenbuck Athletic
1902–1903	Kilmarnock	12	(0)
1903–1906	Grimsby Town	49	(0)
1906–1907	Brentford	2	(0)
1907–1908	Grimsby Town	6	(0)
- Nithsdale Wanderers
- St Cuthbert Wanderers
- Hurlford United

International career
1897	Scotland Juniors	1	(0)
- * Club domestic league appearances and goals

John McConnell (14 February 1881 – 16 March 1957) was a Scottish professional footballer who played in the Football League for Grimsby Town as a full back.

== Career statistics ==
Appearances and goals by club, season and competition
Club	Season	League			National Cup		Total	
Club	Season	Division	Apps	Goals	Apps	Goals	Apps	Goals
Kilmarnock	1902–03	Scottish League First Division	12	0	2	0	14	0
Brentford	1906–07	Southern League First Division	2	0	0	0	2	0
Career total			14	0	2	0	16	0
