= Willie McIver =

English footballer (1876-1934)

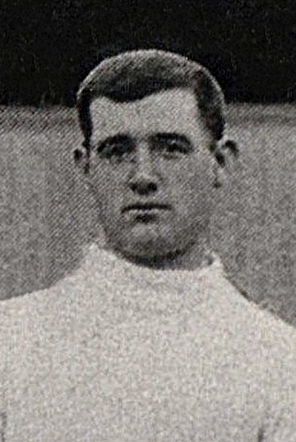
- McIver while with Brentford in 1908.

Personal information
- Full name: William McIver
- Date of birth: 26 December 1876
- Place of birth: Whittle-le-Woods, England
- Date of death: 10 April 1934 (aged 57)
- Place of death: Darwen, England
- Position: Goalkeeper

Senior career*
Years	Team	Apps	(Gls)
1897–1898	Whittle-le-Woods		
1898–1901	Darwen	23	(0)
1901–1907	Blackburn Rovers	126	(0)
1908–1909	Brentford	42	(2)
1909–1911	Hartlepools United	62	(0)
1911–1913	Stockport County	68	(0)
1913–1914	Darwen		
1914–	Nelson		
- Blackburn Rovers
1918	Tottenham Hotspur	3	(0)
1919	Blackburn Trinity		
- * Club domestic league appearances and goals

William McIver (26 December 1876 – 10 April 1934) was an English professional footballer who played in the Football League for Blackburn Rovers, Stockport County and Darwen as a goalkeeper.

== Career statistics ==
Appearances and goals by club, season and competition
Club	Season	League			FA Cup		Total	
Club	Season	Division	Apps	Goals	Apps	Goals	Apps	Goals
Blackburn Rovers	1901–02	First Division	28	0	0	0	28	0
Blackburn Rovers	1902–03	First Division	20	0	0	0	20	0
Blackburn Rovers	1903–04	First Division	7	0	0	0	7	0
Blackburn Rovers	1904–05	First Division	30	0	0	0	30	0
Blackburn Rovers	1905–06	First Division	3	0	0	0	3	0
Blackburn Rovers	1906–07	First Division	9	0	0	0	9	0
Blackburn Rovers	1907–08	First Division	29	0	0	0	29	0
Blackburn Rovers	Total		126	0	0	0	126	0
Brentford	1908–09	Southern League First Division	40	2	2	0	42	2
Hartlepools United	1909–10	North Eastern League	29	0	1	0	30	0
Hartlepools United	1910–11	North Eastern League	33	0	3	0	36	0
Hartlepools United	Total		62	0	4	0	66	0
Stockport County	1911–12	Second Division	38	0	1	0	39	0
Stockport County	1912–13	Second Division	30	0	1	0	31	0
Stockport County	Total		68	0	2	0	70	0
Career total			296	2	8	0	304	2

== Honours ==
Blackburn Rovers

- Lancashire Senior Cup: 1901–02
