= Frank Oliver (footballer) =

English footballer

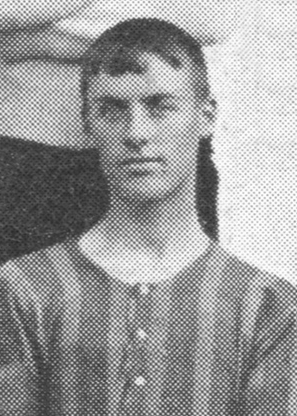
- Oliver while with Brentford in 1904

Personal information
- Full name: Frank Oliver
- Date of birth: 30 November 1882
- Place of birth: Southampton, England
- Positions: Inside left; centre forward

Senior career*
Years	Team	Apps	(Gls)
1904–1905	Brentford	10	(3)
1905–1906	Everton	4	(4)
1906–1909	Clapton Orient	38	(10)
1909–1912	Southport Central		
1912–1913	Clapton Orient	1	(0)
- * Club domestic league appearances and goals

Frank Oliver (30 November 1882 – after 1912) was an English professional footballer who played as a inside left and centre forward in the Football League for Clapton Orient and Everton.

== Career statistics ==
Appearances and goals by club, season and competition
Club	Season	League			FA Cup		Total	
Club	Season	Division	Apps	Goals	Apps	Goals	Apps	Goals
Brentford	1904–05	Southern League First Division	10	0	2	0	12	3
Everton	1905–06	First Division	4	4	1	0	5	4
Career total			14	4	3	0	17	7
