= Alex Glen =

Scottish footballer

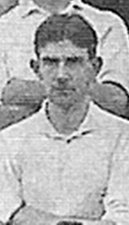
- Glen while with Tottenham Hotspur in 1905

Personal information
- Full name: Alexander Glen
- Date of birth: 11 December 1878
- Place of birth: Kilsyth, Scotland
- Date of death: 21 September 1916 (aged 37)
- Place of death: Ripon, England
- Height: 6 ft 1 in (1.85 m)
- Position: Inside left

Youth career
- Fitzhugh Rovers
- Glasgow Parkhead

Senior career*
| Years | Team | Apps | (Gls) |
- Clyde
| 1902–1903 | Grimsby Town | 13 | (1) |
| 1903–1904 | Notts County | 20 | (3) |
| 1904–1906 | Tottenham Hotspur | 32 | (12) |
| 1906–1907 | Southampton | 29 | (10) |
| 1907–1908 | Portsmouth | 7 | (1) |
| 1908–1909 | Brentford | 11 | (3) |
- * Club domestic league appearances and goals

Alexander Glen (11 December 1878 – 21 September 1916) was a Scottish footballer who played as an inside-forward for various clubs in the 1900s.

== Early life ==
Glen was born in Kilsyth in Lanarkshire, Scotland and was a medical student at the Glasgow Royal Infirmary. During the Boer War, he served in South Africa as a first class orderly with the Scottish National Red Cross Hospital and was awarded the Queen's South Africa Medal with Cape Colony and Orange Free State clasps. He returned to England to commence a career as a professional footballer with Grimsby Town.

== Football career ==
He spent the 1902–03 season with Grimsby in the First Division, generally at inside-left alongside Bill Appleyard in the centre. At the end of the season, when Grimsby Town were relegated, Glen moved to another First Division club, Notts County.

At Notts County, he linked up with Welsh international William Green in the centre and Ellis Gee on the left. At outside-right was Herbert Chapman, who went on to become manager at Huddersfield Town and Arsenal. Glen made twenty appearances for County, scoring three goals, in the 1903–04 season, before a move to Tottenham Hotspur, then of the Southern League. After two seasons with the "Spurs", during which he made 55 appearances and 16 goals in all competitions, he then moved to another Southern League club, Southampton in May 1906.

He joined Southampton in time for their summer tour of Germany, where his fluent German led to him becoming the club's official interpreter.

Glen was a "dexterous, elegant dribbler (who) swerved and weaved with devastating effect". He made his debut for the "Saints" in the opening match of the season, playing at inside-left in a 1–0 defeat at Swindon Town. For the next match, Glen switched to inside-right, where he soon formed a strong partnership with Frank Jefferis on the right side of the Saints attack, with Fred Harrison in the centre. Although Harrison was to finish the season as top-scorer with 12 league goals, Glen contributed 10, including two in a 5–1 defeat of Millwall on 6 October 1906. The combination of Glen, Jefferis and Harrison worked well until a loss of form resulted in both Glen and Harrison being dropped by manager Ernest Arnfield for the last six weeks of the season.

In the summer of 1907, Glen moved down the Solent to join Portsmouth for a season, making just seven appearances, before ending his career at Brentford.

== Later life ==
As of 1911, Glen was living in Portsmouth and working as a commission agent for horses. He later served as a lieutenant in the Royal Army Medical Corps during the First World War and committed suicide with a razor while in camp at Ripon on 21 September 1916. He was buried at Ripon Cemetery.

== Career statistics ==
Appearances and goals by club, season and competition
| Club | Season | League | | | National Cup | | Total | |
| Club | Season | Division | Apps | Goals | Apps | Goals | Apps | Goals |
|---|---|---|---|---|---|---|---|---|
| Tottenham Hotspur | 1904–05 | Southern League First Division | 18 | 10 | 4 | 1 | 22 | 11 |
| Tottenham Hotspur | 1905–06 | Southern League First Division | 14 | 2 | 4 | 0 | 18 | 2 |
| Tottenham Hotspur | Total | | 32 | 12 | 8 | 1 | 40 | 13 |
| Southampton | 1906–07 | Southern League First Division | 29 | 10 | 3 | 0 | 32 | 10 |
| Brentford | 1908–09 | Southern League First Division | 11 | 3 | 0 | 0 | 11 | 3 |
| Career total | | | 73 | 25 | 11 | 1 | 83 | 26 |
