= Fred Connelly =

English footballer

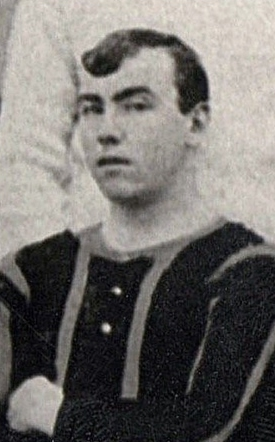
- Connelly while with Brentford in 1908.

Personal information
- Full name: Frederick Henry Connelly
- Date of birth: 3 January 1882
- Place of birth: West Ham, England
- Date of death: 1950 (aged 68)
- Place of death: East Ham, England
- Position: Inside left

Senior career*
Years	Team	Apps	(Gls)
–1906	Rotherham Main Institute		
1906–1908	Bristol City	13	(6)
1908–1909	Brentford	34	(12)
1909–1912	Mexborough Town		
1912–1913	Rotherham County		
- * Club domestic league appearances and goals

Frederick Henry Connelly (3 January 1882 – 1950) was an English professional footballer who played in the Football League for Bristol City as an inside left.

== Career statistics ==
Appearances and goals by club, season and competition
Club	Season	League			FA Cup		Total	
Club	Season	Division	Apps	Goals	Apps	Goals	Apps	Goals
Bristol City	1906–07	First Division	4	2	0	0	4	2
Bristol City	1907–08	First Division	9	4	0	0	9	4
Bristol City	Total		13	6	0	0	13	6
Brentford	1908–09	Southern League First Division	32	12	2	0	34	12
Career total			45	18	2	0	47	18
