= John McCourt (footballer) =

Scottish footballer

Personal information
- Full name: John Francis McCourt
- Date of birth: 9 July 1883
- Place of birth: Rutherglen, Scotland
- Date of death: 24 November 1948 (aged 65)
- Place of death: Hammersmith, England
- Position: Inside left

Senior career*
Years	Team	Apps	(Gls)
- St Mary's College Twickenham
- Cambuslang Hibernian
1905	Celtic	0	(0)
1905–1906	Ayr United	15	(3)
1906	Royal Albert		
1906–1907	Brentford	1	(0)
1908–1909	Fulham	2	(0)
1909–1910	Croydon Common	10	(3)
- * Club domestic league appearances and goals

John Francis McCourt (9 July 1883 – 24 November 1948) was a Scottish professional footballer who played as an inside left in the Football League for Fulham.

== Personal life ==
McCourt was a teacher and by 1927 was headmaster of Laycock Street School in Islington, London.

== Career statistics ==
Appearances and goals by club, season and competition
Club	Season	League			National Cup		Total	
Club	Season	Division	Apps	Goals	Apps	Goals	Apps	Goals
Ayr United	1905–06	Scottish League Second Division	15	3	1	0	16	3
Brentford	1906–07	Southern League First Division	1	0	0	0	1	0
Fulham	1908–09	Second Division	2	0	0	0	2	0
Croydon Common	1909–10	Southern League First Division	10	3	3	0	13	3
Career total			28	6	4	0	32	6
