= Alex Walker (footballer, born 1881) =

Scottish footballer

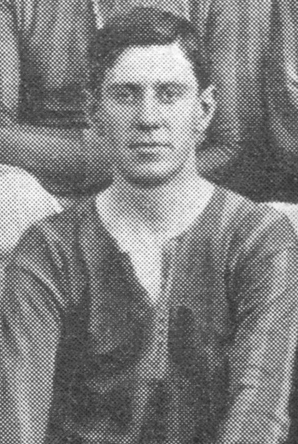
- Walker while with Brentford in 1904

Personal information
- Full name: Alexander White Walker
- Date of birth: 15 November 1881
- Place of birth: Edinburgh, Scotland
- Date of death: 12 May 1916 (aged 34)
- Place of death: Craigleith, Scotland
- Position: Inside right

Senior career*
Years	Team	Apps	(Gls)
1899–1902	Heart of Midlothian	14	(3)
1902–1904	Motherwell	17	(1)
1904–1905	Brentford	8	(0)
- * Club domestic league appearances and goals

Alexander White Walker (15 November 1881 – 12 May 1916) was a Scottish professional footballer who played in the Scottish League for Heart of Midlothian and Motherwell as an inside right. He also played for Southern League club Brentford.

== Personal life ==
Walker was the younger brother of fellow Heart of Midlothian footballer, Bobby Walker. He served as a private in the Royal Scots during the First World War and died on 12 May 1916 from tuberculosis. Walker was buried in North Merchiston Cemetery, Edinburgh and his mother and brother were later interred in the same plot.

== Career statistics ==
Appearances and goals by club, season and competition
Club	Season	League			National cup (Note: Includes Scottish Cup, FA Cup)		Other		Total	
Club	Season	Division	Apps	Goals	Apps	Goals	Apps	Goals	Apps	Goals
Heart of Midlothian	1899–00	Scottish League First Division	4	1	0	0	3 (Note: Appearances in Rosebery Charity Cup)	2	7	3
Heart of Midlothian	1900–01	Scottish League First Division	4	0	0	0	3 (Note: 2 appearances in Rosebery Charity Cup, 1 appearance in East of Scotland Shield)	0	7	0
Heart of Midlothian	1901–02	Scottish League First Division	6	2	0	0	1 (Note: Appearance in East of Scotland Shield)	1	7	3
Heart of Midlothian	Total		14	3	0	0	7	3	21	6
Motherwell	1903–04	Scottish League First Division	17	1	2	0	―		19	1
Brentford	1904–05	Southern League First Division	8	0	0	0	―		8	0
Career total			39	4	2	0	7	3	48	7

== Honours ==
Heart of Midlothian

- Rosebery Charity Cup: 1899–00
