= Ernest Ramsden =

English footballer

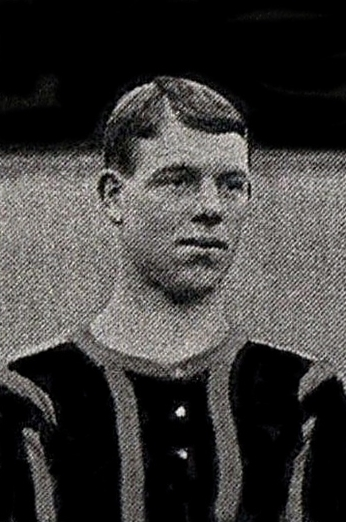
- Ramsden while with Brentford in 1908.

Personal information
- Full name: Ernest Ramsden
- Date of birth: 1882
- Place of birth: Sheffield, England
- Date of death: 1951 (aged 68–69)
- Place of death: Sheffield, England
- Position: Left back

Senior career*
Years	Team	Apps	(Gls)
1907–1908	Denaby United		
1908–1909	Brentford	12	(1)
1909–1910	Grimsby Town	5	(0)
1910–1911	Mexborough Town		
- * Club domestic league appearances and goals

Ernest Ramsden (1882–1951) was an English professional football left back who played in the Football League for Grimsby Town.

== Career statistics ==
Club	Season	League			FA Cup		Total	
Club	Season	Division	Apps	Goals	Apps	Goals	Apps	Goals
Brentford	1908–09	Southern League First Division	12	1	0	0	12	1
Career total			12	1	0	0	12	1
