= Dave Ewing (footballer, born 1881) =

English footballer

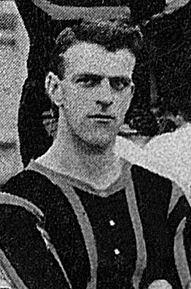
- Ewing while with Brentford in 1908.

Personal information
- Full name: David Alexander Ewing
- Date of birth: June 1881
- Place of birth: Elsecar, England
- Date of death: June 1926 (aged 44–45)
- Place of death: Axminster, England
- Position: Left back

Senior career*
Years	Team	Apps	(Gls)
- Firth Park Wesleyans
- Meadowhall
- Tinsley
- Ranmoor Wesleyans
- Brunswick Mission
1904–	Worksop Town		
1906–1907	Workington		
1907–1908	Chesterfield Town	32	(1)
1908–1909	Brentford	36	(0)
1909–1910	Huddersfield Town	30	(0)
1910–	Castleford Town		
–1911	Machen		
1911–1912	Queens Park Rangers	0	(0)
1912–1913	Newport County	5	(0)
- * Club domestic league appearances and goals

David Alexander Ewing (June 1881 – June 1926) was an English professional footballer who played in the Football League for Chesterfield Town as a left back. He also played minor counties cricket for Monmouthshire.

== Career ==
After beginning his career in non-League football, Ewing moved to Second Division club Chesterfield Town in 1907. He made 35 appearances and scored one goal during the 1907–08 season, before joining Southern League First Division club Brentford in 1908. He was a near ever-present during the 1908–09 season and after spells with Huddersfield Town, Castleford Town and Machen, he ended his career back in the Southern League with Queens Park Rangers and Newport County prior to the First World War.

== Career statistics ==
Appearances and goals by club, season and competition
Club	Season	League			FA Cup		Total	
Club	Season	Division	Apps	Goals	Apps	Goals	Apps	Goals
Chesterfield Town	1907–08	Second Division	32	1	3	0	35	1
Brentford	1908–09	Southern League First Division	36	0	2	0	38	0
Huddersfield Town	1909–10	Midland League	30	0	5	1	35	1
Career total			98	1	10	0	108	2
