= John Montgomery (footballer) =

Scottish footballer (1881–??)

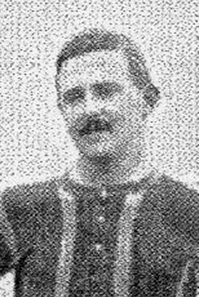
- Montgomery while with Brentford in 1907

Personal information
- Full name: John Montgomery
- Date of birth: 2 September 1881
- Place of birth: Stevenston, Scotland
- Position: Goalkeeper

Senior career*
Years	Team	Apps	(Gls)
–1904	Ardeer Thistle		
1904–1907	Motherwell	55	(0)
1907–1908	Brentford	17	(0)
1909–1910	Port Glasgow Athletic	30	(0)
1910–1912	Hamilton Academical	24	(0)
- * Club domestic league appearances and goals

John Montgomery was a Scottish professional football goalkeeper who played in the Scottish League for Motherwell, Port Glasgow Athletic and Hamilton Academical.

== Career statistics ==
Appearances and goals by club, season and competition
Club	Season	League			National Cup		Other		Total	
Club	Season	Division	Apps	Goals	Apps	Goals	Apps	Goals	Apps	Goals
Motherwell	1904–05	Scottish League First Division	14	0	3	0	—		17	0
Motherwell	1905–06	Scottish League First Division	30	0	1	0	—		31	0
Motherwell	1906–07	Scottish League First Division	11	0	0	0	—		11	0
Motherwell	Total		55	0	4	0	—		59	0
Brentford	1907–08	Southern League First Division	17	0	2	0	—		19	0
Port Glasgow Athletic	1908–09	Scottish League First Division	10	0	0	0	—		10	0
Port Glasgow Athletic	1909–10	Scottish League First Division	20	0	—		—		20	0
Port Glasgow Athletic	Total		30	0	0	0	—		30	0
Hamilton Academical	1909–10	Scottish League First Division	8	0	2	0	6 (Note: 3 appearances in Lanarkshire Cup, 2 appearances in Larkhall Charity Cup, 1 appearance in Lanarkshire Express Cup)	0	16	0
Hamilton Academical	1910–11	Scottish League First Division	18	0	0	0	0	0	18	0
Hamilton Academical	Total		24	0	2	0	6	0	32	0
Career total			126	0	8	0	6	0	140	0

== Honours ==
Hamilton Academical

- Lanarkshire Cup: 1909–10 (shared)
- Lanarkshire Express Cup: 1909–10
