= Alex McCulloch (footballer) =

Scottish footballer

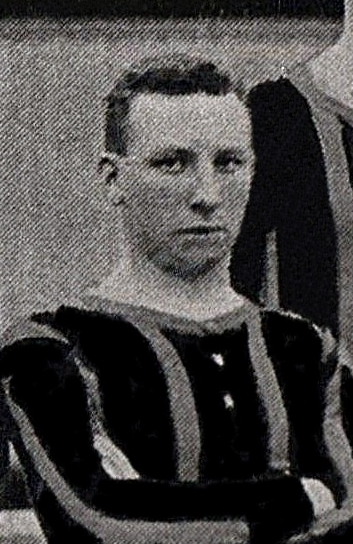
- McCulloch while with Brentford in 1908.

Personal information
- Full name: Alexander McCulloch
- Date of birth: 13 April 1887
- Place of birth: Leith, Scotland
- Date of death: 5 December 1962 (aged 75)
- Place of death: Leith, Scotland
- Positions: Inside right; centre forward

Senior career*
Years	Team	Apps	(Gls)
–1907	Bonnyrigg Rose Athletic		
1907	Leith Athletic	4	(1)
1907–1908	Middlesbrough	3	(1)
1908	Newcastle United	1	(0)
1908	Brentford	12	(3)
1908–1909	Bradford Park Avenue	7	(1)
1909–1910	Swindon Town	21	(3)
1910	Bo'ness		
1910–1911	Reading		
1911–1912	Swindon Town	18	(4)
1912–1913	Coventry City	23	(4)
1913–1915	Raith Rovers	5	(0)
- Alloa Athletic
- St Bernard's
1915	Broxburn United		
1917	Dunfermline Athletic		
1918–1919	Heart of Midlothian	9	(2)
1919–1920	Lincoln City	13	(3)
1920	Aberaman Athletic		
1920	Bargoed Town		
1920–1921	Merthyr Town	3	(0)
1921–1922	Llanelly		
1922	Dundee Hibernian	9	(1)
1922	Gala Fairydean Rovers		
- * Club domestic league appearances and goals

Alexander McCulloch (13 April 1887 – 5 December 1962) was a Scottish professional footballer who played as a forward in the Football League for Middlesbrough, Newcastle United, Bradford Park Avenue, Lincoln City and Merthyr Town. He also played in the Scottish League and in Wales.

== Career statistics ==
Appearances and goals by club, season and competition
Club	Season	League			National cup (Note: Includes Scottish Cup, FA Cup)		Other		Total	
Club	Season	Division	Apps	Goals	Apps	Goals	Apps	Goals	Apps	Goals
Leith Athletic	1907–08	Scottish League Second Division	4	1	2	0	—		6	1
Middlesbrough	1907–08	First Division	3	1	0	0	—		3	1
Newcastle United	1907–08	First Division	1	0	—		—		1	0
Brentford	1908–09	Southern League First Division	12	3	0	0	—		12	3
Swindon Town	1909–10	Southern League First Division	21	3	0	0	2 (Note: Appearances in Southern Professional Charity Cup)	2	23	5
Swindon Town	1911–12	Southern League First Division	14	4	0	0	—		14	4
Swindon Town	1912–13	Southern League First Division	4	0	0	0	—		4	0
Swindon Town	Total		39	7	0	0	2	2	41	9
Coventry City	1912–13	Southern League First Division	23	4	2	0	—		25	4
Raith Rovers	1913–14	Scottish League First Division	5	0	0	0	—		5	0
Heart of Midlothian	1918–19	Scottish League First Division	9	2	0	0	3 (Note: 1 appearance in Victory Cup, 1 appearance in East of Scotland Shield, 1 appearance in Wilson Cup)	0	12	2
Dundee Hibernian	1921–22	Scottish League Second Division	9	1	—		—		9	1
Career Total			105	18	4	0	5	2	114	20

== Honours ==
Heart of Midlothian

- Victory Cup: 1919–20
