= George Gates (footballer) =

English footballer

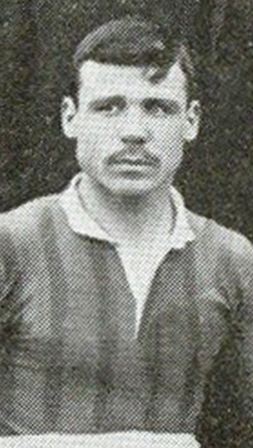
- Gates while with Brentford in 1905

Personal information
- Full name: George James Gates
- Date of birth: 2 June 1883
- Place of birth: Hammersmith, England
- Date of death: 23 June 1960 (aged 77)
- Place of death: Newton Abbot, England
- Positions: Right half; forward

Senior career*
Years	Team	Apps	(Gls)
–1904	Hammersmith United		
1904–1906	Brentford	15	(3)
1906–1908	Clapton Orient	53	(7)
1909–1910	Grimsby Town	17	(2)
1910–1914	Merthyr Town		
1914–	Troedyrhiw Stars		
1919–1921	Bargoed		

Managerial career
- 1920–1921: Bargoed (player-manager)
- * Club domestic league appearances and goals

George James Gates (2 June 1883 – 23 June 1960) was an English professional footballer who played as a right half and forward in the Football League for Clapton Orient and Grimsby Town. He later player-managed Welsh non-league club Bargoed.

== Career statistics ==
Appearances and goals by club, season and competition
Club	Season	League			FA Cup		Total	
Club	Season	Division	Apps	Goals	Apps	Goals	Apps	Goals
Brentford	1904–05	Southern League First Division	8	3	0	0	8	3
Brentford	1905–06	Southern League First Division	7	0	1	0	8	0
Career total			15	3	1	0	16	3
