= James Bellingham (footballer) =

Scottish footballer

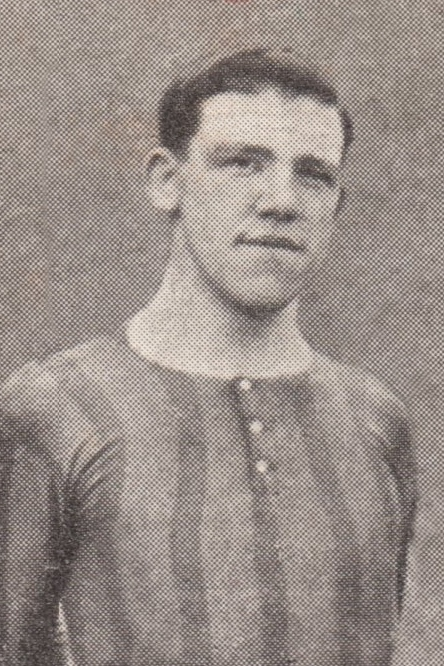
- Bellingham while with Brentford in 1903

Personal information
- Full name: James Bellingham
- Date of birth: 9 April 1877
- Place of birth: Falkirk, Scotland
- Date of death: 1 October 1955 (aged 78)
- Place of death: Harrow, England
- Position: Centre half

Youth career
- Falkirk Excelsior
- Falkirk Hawthorne
- Woodbine Rovers

Senior career*
Years	Team	Apps	(Gls)
1898–1900	Falkirk	12	(2)
1900–1901	Queens Park Rangers	15	(0)
1901–1903	Grimsby Town	4	(0)
1903–1905	Brentford	38	(1)
1905	Willesden Town		
1905–1906	Brentford	4	(0)
1906–1914	Tunbridge Wells Rangers		
- * Club domestic league appearances and goals

James Bellingham (9 April 1877 – 1 October 1955) was a Scottish professional footballer who played as a centre half in the Football League for Grimsby Town. During his second spell with Southern League club Brentford, he took on the role of the club's secretary while secretary-manager Dick Molyneux was ill.

== Personal life ==
Bellingham was the cousin of fellow Falkirk footballer Thomas Bellingham. At the time of the 1901 United Kingdom census, Bellingham was a lodger at an address in Willesden along with Queens Park Rangers teammate Sandy Newbigging.

== Career statistics ==
Appearances and goals by club, season and competition
Club	Season	League			FA Cup		Total	
Club	Season	Division	Apps	Goals	Apps	Goals	Apps	Goals
Queens Park Rangers	1900–01	Southern League First Division	15	0	2	0	17	0
Grimsby Town	1901–02 (Note: James Bellingham at WorldFootball.net)	First Division	4	0	0	0	4	0
Brentford	1903–04	Southern League First Division	27	1	5	0	32	1
Brentford	1904–05	Southern League First Division	11	0	0	0	11	0
Brentford	Total		38	1	5	0	43	1
Brentford	1905–06	Southern League First Division	4	0	—		4	0
Brentford	Total		42	1	5	0	47	1
Career total			61	1	7	0	68	1
