= Kevin Cullis =

English football manager

Personal information
- Full name: Kevin Cullis

Managerial career
- Years: Team
- 1996: Swansea City

Kevin Cullis (born 1958) is an English former association football manager and convicted fraudster from Brierley Hill.

== Managerial career ==
Cullis' brief managerial career at the professional level came when he was appointed manager of Third Division Swansea City on 8 February 1996 by prospective new chairman Michael Thompson. He had never played nor coached in professional football and his only previous management experience was as the chairman and youth coach of non-league club Cradley Town, then of the West Midlands (Regional) League Premier Division, and based at Cradley in the Black Country. He was also involved in a potential takeover of Exeter City in 1994 with Cradley manager Steve Daniels.

Cullis managed Swansea City for just one-and-a-half games: a 1–0 home defeat to Swindon Town and 45 minutes of an eventual 4–0 defeat at Blackpool. In the second match, which took place at Bloomfield Road on 13 February 1996, Cullis’ planned half-time team talk was ignored as the players took control. Christian Edwards gave the team talk and game plan instead, and Cullis resigned shortly afterwards.

== Personal life ==
In April 2003, Cullis was jailed for nine months for fraud and deception at Wolverhampton Crown Court after falsely claiming to be a highly paid marketing consultant. He was jailed again, for a further nine months, at the same court in September 2004 for handling a stolen insurance certificate and using it with intent to deceive.

== Managerial statistics ==
| Team | Nat | From | To | Record | | | | |
| Team | Nat | From | To | Games | Won | Drawn | Lost | Win % |
|---|---|---|---|---|---|---|---|---|
| Swansea City | (Wales) | 8 February 1996 | 14 February 1996 | 2 | 0 | 0 | 2 | 0.00 |
