= Ronald McKenzie =

Scottish footballer

Personal information
- Full name: Ronald McKenzie
- Date of birth: 18 July 1883
- Place of birth: Inverness, Scotland
- Date of death: 13 August 1954 (aged 71)
- Place of death: Inverness, Scotland
- Position: Inside left

Senior career*
Years	Team	Apps	(Gls)
1905–1906	Clachnacuddin		
1906–1907	Inverness Thistle		
1907–1909	Chelsea	0	(0)
1909	Brentford	10	(1)
1909–1910	Lincoln City	28	(6)
1910–1912	Clachnacuddin		
- * Club domestic league appearances and goals

Ronald McKenzie (18 July 1883 – 13 August 1954) was a Scottish footballer who scored 6 goals from 28 appearances in the Football League playing for Lincoln City. He played as an inside left. He was on the books of Chelsea without representing them in the league. He transferred to Brentford on 2 January 1909 and appeared in the Southern League and F.A. Cup. Before and after his English career he played for Clachnacuddin and Inverness Thistle in his native Scotland.
