= Norman Brown (footballer) =

English footballer

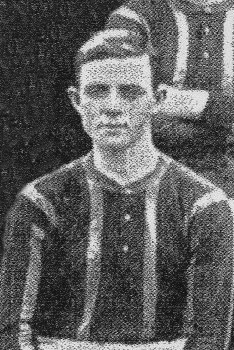
- Brown with Brentford 1907

Personal information
- Full name: Norman Liddle Brown
- Date of birth: 30 January 1885
- Place of birth: Willington Quay, England
- Date of death: 9 January 1938 (aged 52)
- Place of death: North Tyneside, England
- Height: 5 ft 6 1/2 in (1.69 m)
- Position: Outside right

Senior career*
Years	Team	Apps	(Gls)
- Willington Athletic
1904–1907	Sunderland	27	(1)
1907–1908	Brentford	24	(1)
1908–1909	Luton Town		
1909–1910	Southend United		
1910–1911	Millwall Athletic		
- North Shields
1913	Blackpool	13	(2)
- * Club domestic league appearances and goals

Norman Liddle Brown (30 January 1885 – 9 January 1938) was an English professional footballer. An outside right or centre forward, he played for eight clubs in his career.

== Career ==
Brown began his career with his hometown club Willington Athletic in the early 1900s. In 1904 he signed for Sunderland, for whom he made 27 Football League appearances and scored one goal.

In 1906, he left the Black Cats and played for five different clubs over a seven-year period, before joining Blackpool in 1913. In his one season with the Seasiders, he played thirteen League games and scored two goals. He retired at the end of the season.
