= Bert Badger =

English footballer (1882–1965)

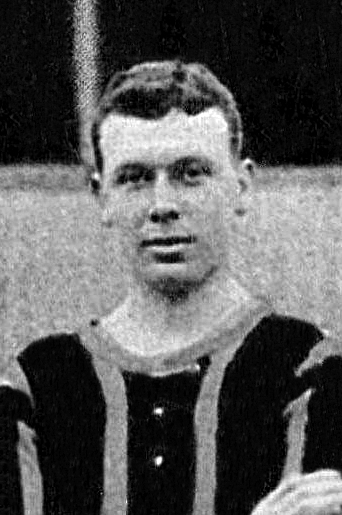
- Badger while with Brentford 1908

Personal information
- Full name: Herbert Osborne Badger
- Date of birth: 4 October 1882
- Place of birth: Islington, England
- Date of death: 16 March 1965 (aged 82)
- Place of death: Colchester, England
- Position: Wing half

Senior career*
Years	Team	Apps	(Gls)
- Clacton Town
- Colchester Town
- Ilford
1903–1904	Tottenham Hotspur	0	(0)
1904–1906	Woolwich Arsenal	0	(0)
1906–1908	Watford	54	(5)
1908–1909	Brentford	39	(1)
1909–1910	Nottingham Forest	2	(0)
1910–1911	Brentford	14	(0)
- * Club domestic league appearances and goals

Herbert Osborne Badger (4 October 1882 – 16 March 1965) was an English footballer who played as a wing half. He was also employed at various times as a professional violinist and in later life as a publican.

== Early life ==
Badger was born in Islington, London, the son of George Badger (1840–1905), a professional musician, and Elizabeth Dalton (née Rose) (1841–1913). He attended Great College Street School, Westminster and was later trained to play the violin, receiving tuition from renowned violist and teacher Lionel Tertis. When his father moved the family to Brighton in order to take up the role of orchestra leader of the Alhambra Music Hall, Badger was employed for a short time as an orchestral violinist at the West Pier.

== Move to Clacton ==
When his father took over running the day resort, Rigg's Retreat in Clacton, Badger would help with the general day-to-day running. But, rather than fulfil his father's ultimate intentions for a musical career, Badger followed his own passion for football.

== Career ==
Badger started his career in Essex, playing for Clacton Town (as a contemporary of Vivian J Woodward), Colchester Town and Ilford. He joined Tottenham Hotspur as an amateur in November 1903 and turned professional 10 months later with Football League side Woolwich Arsenal. However, Badger was unable to break into the first team, and left to join Hertfordshire club Watford in August 1906 without playing a first team game. Badger made 54 Southern League appearances while at Cassio Road, scoring 5 times, and also played twice in the FA Cup. He left Watford to join Brentford in 1908 and Nottingham Forest the following year. At Forest, Badger finally played in the Football League.

== First World War ==
Badger was first employed during the war as a special constable and then served with the Royal Garrison Artillery at Harwich. During the war he stayed an enthusiastic amateur sportsman and during an inter-services football match he captained the Army side against one from the Royal Navy on the Parkeston ground. He was also a keen cricketer and played up to minor county standard. While in the Army he played a match against Test cricketer Frank Woolley.

== Later life ==
After war service, Badger formed a dance band called Hava Band and was later installed as manager of the Carlton Hotel, Clacton in May 1939, taking over the licence from his son, James, who was called up for war service in 1940. He retired in 1959.

Badger died in Colchester in 1965.
