= Jimmy Tomlinson =

English footballer

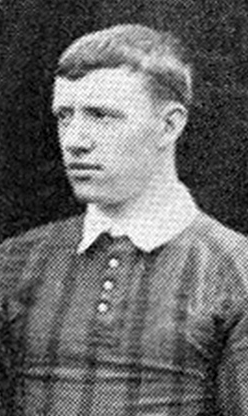
- Tomlinson with Brentford in 1905.

Personal information
- Full name: James Tomlinson
- Date of birth: 2 February 1881
- Place of birth: Lower Darwen, England
- Date of death: 21 February 1963 (aged 82)
- Place of death: Southport, England
- Position: Centre half

Senior career*
Years	Team	Apps	(Gls)
1900–1902	Blackburn Rovers	1	(0)
1902–	Nelson		
–1904	Darwen		
1904–1908	Brentford	98	(2)
1908–1909	Norwich City		
1909	Bolton Wanderers	0	(0)
1909–1910	Reading		
1910	Chorley		
- * Club domestic league appearances and goals

James Tomlinson (2 February 1881 – 21 February 1963) was a professional footballer who made one appearance as a centre half in the Football League for Blackburn Rovers.

== Career statistics ==
Appearances and goals by club, season and competition
Club	Season	League			FA Cup		Total	
Club	Season	Division	Apps	Goals	Apps	Goals	Apps	Goals
Blackburn Rovers	1900–01	First Division	1	0	0	0	1	0
Brentford	1904–05	Southern League First Division	31	0	3	0	34	0
Brentford	1905–06	Southern League First Division	12	0	0	0	12	0
Brentford	1906–07	Southern League First Division	30	1	4	0	34	1
Brentford	1907–08	Southern League First Division	25	1	2	1	27	1
Brentford	Total		98	2	9	1	107	2
Career total			99	2	9	1	108	2
