= George Parsonage =

English footballer

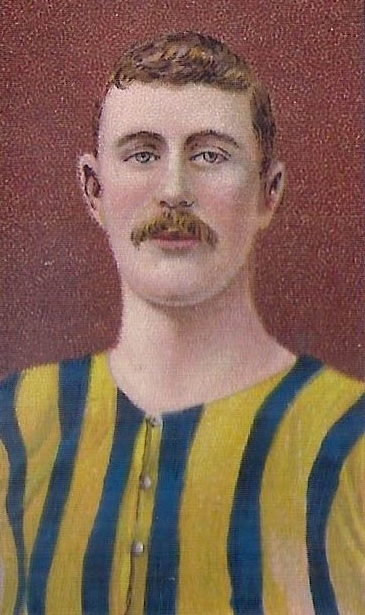
- Parsonage while a Brentford player

Personal information
- Full name: George Parsonage
- Date of birth: November 1880
- Place of birth: Darwen, England
- Date of death: 22 May 1919 (aged 38)
- Place of death: Darwen, England
- Position: Half back

Senior career*
Years	Team	Apps	(Gls)
1899–1900	Oswaldtwistle Rovers		
1900–1901	Blackburn Rovers	0	(0)
1901–1903	Accrington Stanley		
1903–1908	Brentford	176	(12)
1908–1909	Fulham	22	(3)
1910–1911	Oldham Athletic	0	(0)
1911	Darwen		

Managerial career
- 1907–1908: Brentford (player-manager)
- * Club domestic league appearances and goals

George Parsonage (November 1880 – 22 May 1919) was an English professional footballer, most notable for his time as a half back and player-manager in the Southern League with Brentford. He was banned from football for life by the Football Association in 1909, but later returned to the game.

== Club career ==
=== Early years ===
A half back, Parsonage began his senior career at local First Division club Blackburn Rovers in 1900, after joining from Oswaldtwistle Rovers. He failed to make a league appearance for the club before dropping into the Lancashire Combination to sign for Accrington Stanley in 1901.

=== Brentford ===
Parsonage moved to London to sign for Southern League First Division club Brentford in 1903. He became captain of the club in the 1904–05 season and was a "tower of strength" for five seasons, before departing Griffin Park in 1908. He made 194 appearances and scored 15 goals for the Bees.

=== Fulham ===
Parsonage returned to League football with Second Division club Fulham in 1908. He made 23 appearances and scored three goals during the 1908–09 season.

==== "The Parsonage Affair" ====
While a Fulham player, Parsonage was the subject of transfer interest from Second Division club Chesterfield in 1909. Reportedly not keen on a move to Derbyshire, Parsonage submitted a request for a £50 signing-on fee (equivalent to £5,100 in 2025), which was £40 higher than the Football League's maximum. Chesterfield reported the request to the Football Association, who banned Parsonage sine die from football. A petition signed by thousands of fans failed to see the ban overturned.

=== Later career ===
Following an appeal from the Players' Union in January 1910, Parsonage's suspension was removed in July 1910. He returned to football with First Division club Oldham Athletic in September 1910. He ended his career with hometown Lancashire Combination Second Division club Darwen, whom he joined in March 1911.

== Managerial and coaching career ==
Parsonage had a spell as player-manager of Brentford during the 1907–08 season. He later coached at Oldham Athletic.

== International career ==
Parsonage's form while at Brentford saw him called up for two England trial games. He played for Amateurs versus Professionals on 16 January 1905 and for the South versus the North the following month, but was passed over in favour of Charlie Roberts.

== Career statistics ==
=== Player ===
Appearances and goals by club, season and competition
Club	Season	League			FA Cup		Total	
Club	Season	Division	Apps	Goals	Apps	Goals	Apps	Goals
Brentford	1903–04	Southern League First Division	34	3	5	2	39	5
Brentford	1904–05	Southern League First Division	34	2	3	0	37	2
Brentford	1905–06	Southern League First Division	33	1	4	1	37	2
Brentford	1906–07	Southern League First Division	37	2	4	0	41	2
Brentford	1907–08	Southern League First Division	38	4	2	0	40	4
Brentford	Total		176	12	18	3	194	15
Fulham	1908–09	Second Division	22	3	1	0	23	3
Career total			198	15	19	3	217	18

=== Manager ===
Team	From	To	Record					Ref
Team	From	To	G	W	D	L	Win %	Ref
Brentford	January 1908	April 1908	17	8	3	6	47.06	
Total			17	8	3	6	47.06	—
