= Robert Haworth (footballer) =

English footballer

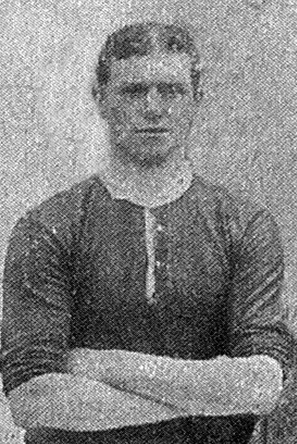

Personal information
- Date of birth: 1 January 1879
- Place of birth: Blackburn, England
- Position: Defender

Senior career*
| Years | Team | Apps | (Gls) |
| ? | Christ Church F.C. | ? | |
| 1897?-1898? | Darwen | 0 | |
| 1898?-1904 | Blackburn Rovers | 122 | (5) |
| 1904-1905 | Fulham | 33 | (?) |
| 1905-? | Brentford | ? | |
| ? | Chorley | | |
| ? | Clitheroe Central F.C. | | |
- * Club domestic league appearances and goals

Robert 'Bob' Haworth (1 January 1879 - ?) was an English-born footballer who played as a centre half and right half in the 1890s and 1900s.

In the 1897–98 season he was on Darwen's books, before transferring to Blackburn Rovers, where he made 122 Football League appearances. In the summer of 1904 he transferred to Fulham in the Southern Football League, and played 42 games for them before moving to Brentford in 1905.
