= Adam Bowman =

Scottish footballer (1880–1937)

Personal information
- Full name: Adam Bowman
- Date of birth: 4 August 1880
- Place of birth: Forfar, Scotland
- Date of death: 4 February 1937 (aged 56)
- Place of death: Blackburn, England
- Height: 5 ft 10 1/2 in (1.79 m)
- Positions: Inside left; centre forward

Senior career*
Years	Team	Apps	(Gls)
- St Johnstone
1900–1901	East Stirlingshire	1	(0)
1901	St Bernard's		
1901	East Stirlingshire	10	(10)
1901–1902	Everton	9	(3)
1902–1906	Blackburn Rovers	99	(43)
1907–1908	Brentford	30	(21)
1908–1909	Leeds City	15	(6)
1909	Brentford	12	(4)
1909–1910	Portsmouth		
1910–1911	Forfar Athletic		
1911–1912	Leith Athletic	17	(6)
- Accrington Stanley
- * Club domestic league appearances and goals

Adam Bowman (4 August 1880 – 4 February 1937) was a Scottish professional footballer who played in the Football League for Blackburn Rovers, Leeds City and Everton as an inside left or centre forward.

== Personal life ==
After retiring from football, Bowman settled in Blackburn and became the licensee of a number of pubs.

== Career statistics ==
Appearances and goals by club, season and competition
Club	Season	League			National cup (Note: Includes Scottish Cup, FA Cup)		Total	
Club	Season	Division	Apps	Goals	Apps	Goals	Apps	Goals
East Stirlingshire	1900–01	Scottish League Second Division	1	0	—		1	0
East Stirlingshire	1901–02	Scottish League Second Division	10	10	0	0	10	10
East Stirlingshire	Total		11	10	0	0	11	10
Everton	1901–02	First Division	4	1	2	0	6	1
Everton	1902–03	First Division	5	2	0	0	5	2
Everton	Total		9	3	2	0	11	3
Blackburn Rovers	1902–03	First Division	7	5	0	0	7	5
Blackburn Rovers	1903–04	First Division	17	7	0	0	17	7
Blackburn Rovers	1904–05	First Division	31	13	0	0	31	13
Blackburn Rovers	1905–06	First Division	32	15	0	0	32	15
Blackburn Rovers	1906–07	First Division	12	3	0	0	12	3
Blackburn Rovers	Total		99	43	0	0	99	43
Brentford	1907–08	Southern League First Division	30	20	2	1	32	21
Leeds City	1908–09	Second Division	15	6	1	1	16	7
Brentford	1909–10	Southern League First Division	12	4	—		12	4
Brentford	Total		42	24	2	1	44	25
Leith Athletic	1911–12	Scottish League Second Division	17	6	5	1	22	7
Career total			193	86	10	3	203	89
