= Bob Crone =

Irish footballer (1870–1943)

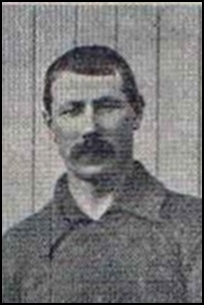
- Crone while with Brentford in 1902

Personal information
- Full name: Robert Crone
- Date of birth: 4 January 1870
- Place of birth: Belfast, Ireland
- Date of death: 15 January 1943 (aged 73)
- Place of death: Barrow-in-Furness, England
- Height: 1.82 m (6 ft 0 in)
- Position: Full-back

Senior career*
Years	Team	Apps	(Gls)
1886–1889	Distillery	30	(4)
1889–1890	Glentoran	3	(0)
1890–1891	Middlesbrough		
1891–1894	West Bromwich Albion	40	(0)
1894–1895	Burton Swifts	30	(2)
1895–1897	Notts County	32	(0)
1897–1901	Bedminster		
1902–1903	Brentford	2	(0)
Total		137	(6)

International career
1889–1890	Ireland	4	(0)

Managerial career
- 1906: Brentford (caretaker)
- * Club domestic league appearances and goals

Robert Crone (4 January 1870 – 15 January 1943) was an Irish football player and coach. He was the younger brother of fellow player Billy Crone.

== Playing career ==
Crone, who played as a full-back, played club football in both Ireland and England for Distillery, Glentoran, Middlesbrough, West Bromwich Albion, Burton Swifts, Notts County, Bedminster and Brentford.

Crone also earned four international caps for Ireland between 1889 and 1890.

== Coaching career ==
After retiring as a player in 1901, Crone became a coach at Bristol City (1901–1903), Brentford (1902–1908, also serving briefly as caretaker manager in 1906), West Bromwich Albion (1908–1909) and Workington (1909–1910). He served as trainer at Southern League side Swansea Town between 1912 and 1914, working under former Brentford colleague Walter Whittaker.
