= Tom McAllister (footballer) =

Scottish footballer

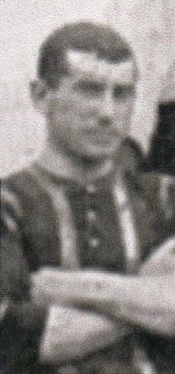
- McAllister while with Brentford in 1907.

Personal information
- Full name: Thomas McAllister
- Date of birth: 7 September 1881
- Place of birth: Govan, Scotland
- Date of death: 14 March 1951 (aged 69)
- Place of death: Leeds, England
- Height: 5 ft 9 in (1.75 m)
- Position: Right half

Senior career*
Years	Team	Apps	(Gls)
1903–1904	Castleford Town		
1904–1906	Blackburn Rovers	2	(0)
1906–1908	Brentford	64	(10)
1908–1910	Leeds City	53	(0)
1910–1912	Castleford Town		
1912–1913	Halifax Town		
- Halifax Town
- * Club domestic league appearances and goals

Thomas McAllister (7 September 1881 – 14 March 1951) was a Scottish professional footballer who played as a right half in the Football League for Leeds City and Blackburn Rovers.

== Career statistics ==
Appearances and goals by club, season and competition
Club	Season	League			FA Cup		Total	
Club	Season	Division	Apps	Goals	Apps	Goals	Apps	Goals
Blackburn Rovers	1905–06	First Division	2	0	0	0	2	0
Brentford	1906–07	Southern League First Division	28	9	4	0	32	9
Brentford	1907–08	Southern League First Division	36	1	0	0	36	1
Brentford	Total		64	10	4	0	68	10
Leeds City	1908–09	Second Division	32	0	4	0	36	0
Leeds City	1909–10	Second Division	21	0	1	0	22	0
Leeds City	Total		53	0	5	0	58	0
Career total			119	10	9	0	128	10
