= Fred Corbett =

English footballer

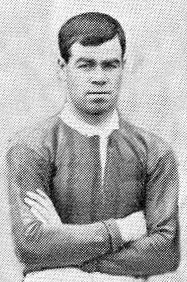
- Corbett while at Brentford in 1906

Personal information
- Full name: Frederick Herbert Corbett
- Date of birth: c. 1880
- Place of birth: Canning Town, England
- Date of death: 15 April 1924 (aged 43–44)
- Place of death: Brentford, England
- Height: 5 ft 8 in (1.73 m)
- Position: Forward

Youth career
- Old St Luke's

Senior career*
Years	Team	Apps	(Gls)
1899–1900	Thames Ironworks	3	(0)
1900–1901	West Ham United	33	(13)
1901–1903	Bristol Rovers		
1903–1905	Bristol City	49	(14)
1905	Bristol Rovers		
1905–1908	Brentford	93	(37)
1908–1911	Bristol Rovers		
1911	Worcester City		
1911–1912	New Brompton	22	(6)
1912–1913	Merthyr Town		
1913–1914	Tranmere Rovers		
1914	Croydon Common		
1919	Winsford United		
- * Club domestic league appearances and goals

Frederick Corbett (c. 1880 – 15 April 1924) was a professional footballer who played as a forward.

== Career ==
Corbett began his career at Thames Ironworks, where he worked as a labourer, and the club's successor West Ham United. Upon making his debut for Thames Ironworks, in a 1–0 loss away to Reading on 16 September 1899, Corbett became the first black player to represent West Ham United. Corbett subsequently became the third black footballer to play in England, after Andrew Watson and Arthur Wharton.

Corbett later joined Bristol Rovers in 1901, spending three spells at the club punctuated by time at Bristol City and Brentford. Following his final departure from Bristol Rovers in 1911 he joined New Brompton. He was one of the first black footballers to play in the Football League.

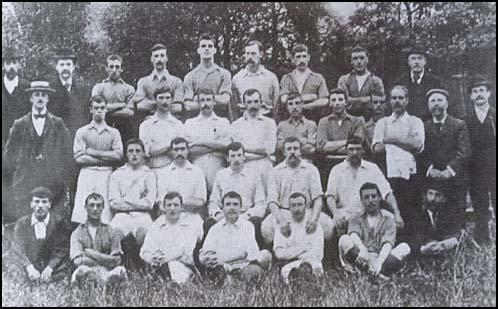
Thames Ironworks Squad, 1899. Fred Corbett is on the left of the second row.

== Sources ==
- Byrne, Stephen; Jay, Mike (2003). Bristol Rovers Football Club – The Definitive History 1883–2003. Stroud: Tempus. p. 489. ISBN 0-7524-2717-2.
