= Walter Whittaker =

English footballer and manager (1878–1917)

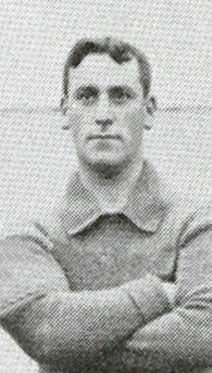
- Whittaker while with Brentford 1905

Personal information
- Full name: Walter Whittaker
- Date of birth: 20 September 1878
- Place of birth: Manchester, England
- Date of death: 2 June 1917 (aged 38)
- Place of death: Swansea, Wales
- Position: Goalkeeper

Youth career
- 1894–1895: Molyneaux

Senior career*
| Years | Team | Apps | (Gls) |
| 1895–???? | Buxton | | |
| –1896 | Molyneaux | | |
| 1896 | Newton Heath | 3 | (0) |
| 1896–1897 | Fairfield | | |
| 1897–1898 | Grimsby Town | 28 | (0) |
| 1898–1900 | Reading | | |
| 1900–1901 | Blackburn Rovers | 52 | (0) |
| 1901–1903 | Grimsby Town | 47 | (0) |
| 1903–1904 | Derby County | 12 | (0) |
| 1904–1906 | Brentford | 63 | (0) |
| 1906–1907 | Reading | | |
| 1907–1910 | Clapton Orient | 90 | (0) |
| 1910–1912 | Exeter City | | |
| 1912–1914 | Swansea Town | | |
| 1914 | Llanelly | | |

Managerial career
- 1912–1914: Swansea Town (player-manager)
- 1914: Llanelly (player-manager)
- * Club domestic league appearances and goals

Walter Whittaker (20 September 1878 – 2 June 1917) was an English football goalkeeper who played in the Football League for Newton Heath, Grimsby Town, Blackburn Rovers, Derby County, Clapton Orient and Swansea Town.

== Playing career ==
Whittaker began his career with Manchester League side Molyneaux. He had a short spell with Buxton, but returned to Molyneaux before joining Newton Heath in February 1896 as a replacement for William Douglas, who had transferred to Derby County. Whittaker was one of four goalkeepers Newton Heath tried following Douglas' departure (including their regular left-half Walter Cartwright), but the team lost all three matches Whittaker appeared in; he was transferred to Fairfield at the end of the season.

After a season away, Whittaker returned to the Football League with Second Division side Grimsby Town in May 1897, playing in all but two of the club's matches in the 1897–98 season. In May 1898, Whittaker transferred to Southern League club Reading, where he played for almost two seasons before returning to The Football League with Blackburn Rovers in February 1900. After just over 50 league appearances for Blackburn, Whittaker rejoined Grimsby Town – newly promoted to the First Division – in December 1901. The club narrowly avoided relegation at the end of the 1901–02 season, but they were unable to repeat the feat in 1902–03, and at the end of the season, after 47 more appearances for Grimsby, Whittaker transferred to Derby County to remain a First Division player.

Whittaker was predominantly Derby's second-choice goalkeeper in 1903–04, making just 12 league appearances out of a potential 34, before returning to the Southern League with Brentford in May 1904. After two years with Brentford, he moved back to Reading for a season, before returning to the Football League again in 1907 with Second Division side Clapton Orient. After making 90 Football League and six FA Cup appearances in three years with the London side, he made a final return to the Southern League First Division with Exeter City in July 1910.

== Management career ==
In July 1912, Whittaker was appointed as the first manager of Swansea Town and spent two years with the newly elected Southern League Second Division club in a player-manager capacity. In his first season with Swansea, he won the Welsh Cup and guided the team to third place in the league. After leaving Swansea, he took over as player-manager at nearby Llanelly, but his time there was cut short by the outbreak of the First World War.

== Personal life ==
Whittaker died of pneumonia in 1917 at the age of 38.

== Honours ==
=== As a manager ===
Swansea Town

- Welsh Cup: 1912–13
