= List of Brentford F.C. seasons =

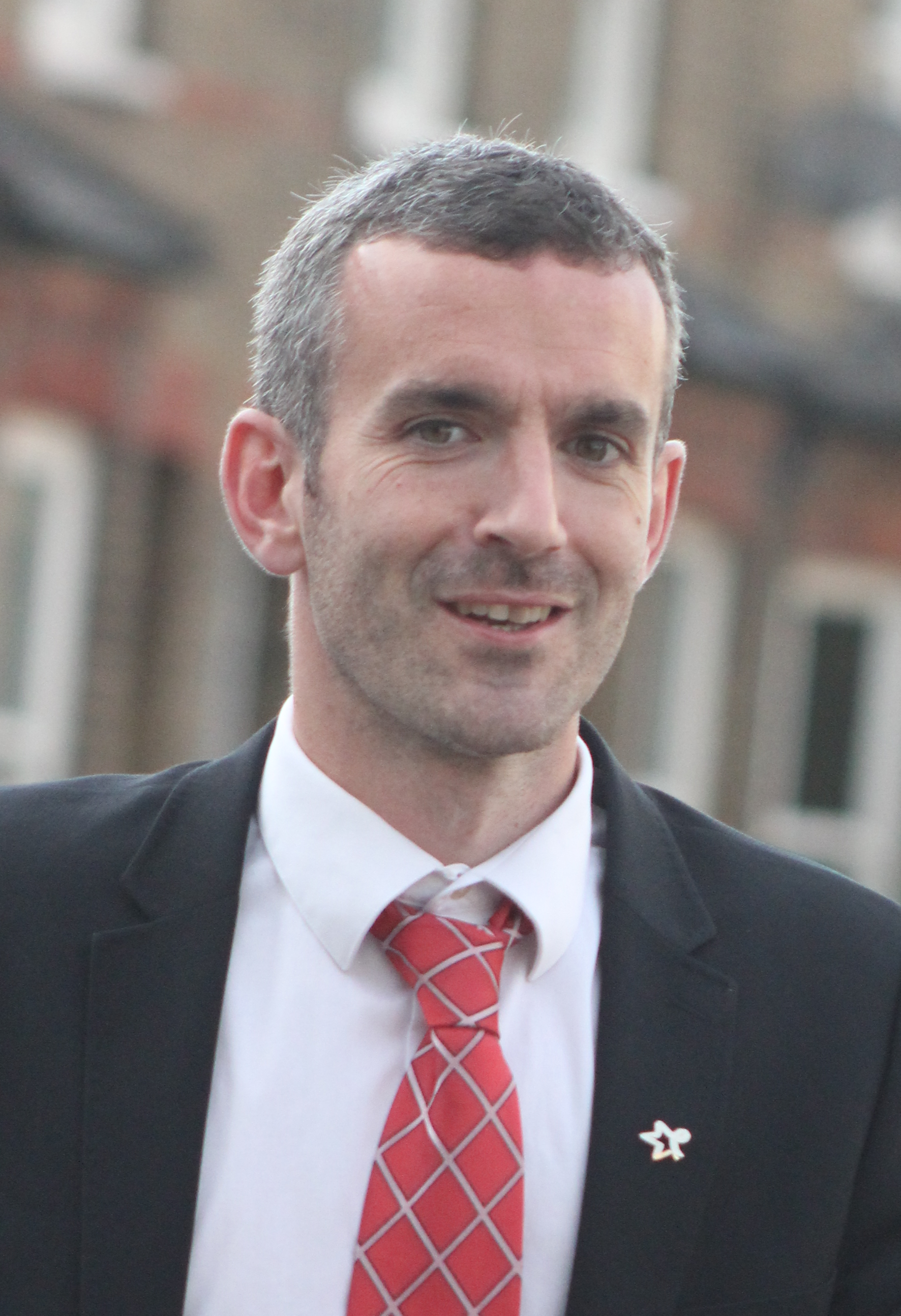
Kevin O'Connor played in a club-record 16 Football League seasons.

Brentford Football Club is an English professional football club based in Brentford, Hounslow, London. Between 1892 and 1920, the first team competed in the West London Alliance, West London League, London League, Southern League and Western League. Since 1920, the first team has competed in the Football League, the Premier League and other nationally and internationally organised competitions.

Statistically Brentford's best league season was 1929–30 in the Third Division South, earning 2.12 points a game (adjusted to 3 points for a win) and winning all 21 home matches. It is a national record which still stands as of April 2026. The 1932–33 and 1934–35 Third Division South and Second Division title-winning seasons yielded 2.10 and 2.07 points per game respectively (adjusted to 3 points for a win). The 94 points accumulated during the 2013–14 second-place finish in League One is Brentford's record points total. Prior to achieving promotion to the Premier League via the Championship play-offs in 2021, Brentford's 9 failed attempts to gain promotion through the EFL play-offs was a national record.

Brentford has never won a major cup, with the club's furthest advancement being the semi-final of the EFL Cup (2020–21) and the quarter-finals of the FA Cup (1937–38, 1945–46, 1948–49, 1988–89). The club has reached three EFL Trophy finals (1985, 2001, 2011) and finished as runners-up on each occasion. In 1992–93, the club reached the semi-finals of the Anglo-Italian Cup on its only entry into the competition.

== Key ==
- Pld = Matches played
- W = Matches won
- D = Matches drawn
- L = Matches lost
- GF = Goals for
- GA = Goals against
- Pts = Points
- Pos. = Final position
- QR2 = Second qualifying round
- QR3 = Third qualifying round
- QR4 = Fourth qualifying round
- QR5 = Fifth qualifying round
- QR6 = Sixth qualifying round
- IR = Intermediate qualifying round
- R1 = First round
- R1S = Southern area first round
- R2 = Second round
- R2S = Southern area second round
- R3 = Third round
- R4 = Fourth round
- R5 = Fifth round
- QF = Quarter-finals
- QFS = Southern area quarter-finals
- GrpS = Southern area group stage
- SFS = Southern area semi-finals
- FS = Southern area finals

Symbol/colour	Meaning
↑	Promoted through the automatic promotion places
↑	Promoted through the English Football League play-offs
↓	Relegated
RU	Runners-up
#	Applied for re-election to the English Football League
‡	Qualified for the English Football League play-offs, not promoted
†	Top goalscorer in Brentford's division
♦	Top goalscorer in the English Football League
♠	Club record

== Seasons ==
Correct as of the end of the 2025–26 season. For information on the season in progress, see 2026–27 Brentford F.C. season.

List of Brentford F.C. seasons
Season	League									FA Cup	EFL Cup	EFL Trophy	Minor cup victories	Top scorer(s) (league)		Top scorer(s) (all comps)		Average home league att.	Notes
Season	Division	Pld	W	D	L	GF	GA	Pts	Pos.	FA Cup	EFL Cup	EFL Trophy	Minor cup victories	Name(s)	Goals	Name(s)	Goals	Average home league att.	Notes
1889–90	—	—	—	—	—	—	—	—	—	—	—	—	—	—	—	Bonell	5	—	(Note: Brentford played friendly matches during the season.)
1890–91	—	—	—	—	—	—	—	—	—	—	—	—	—	—	—	—	—	—	(Note: Brentford played friendly matches and in minor cups during the season.)
1891–92	—	—	—	—	—	—	—	—	—	—	—	—	—	—	—	—	—	—	
1892–93	West London Alliance	12	10	2	0	33	6	22	1 of 7	—	—	—	—	—	—	—	—		
1893–94	—	—	—	—	—	—	—	—	—	—	—	—	Middlesex Junior Cup	—	—	—	—	—	(Note: Brentford entered the West London League, but withdrew before the end of the season. The club's results were expunged.)
1894–95	—	—	—	—	—	—	—	—	—	—	—	—	West Middlesex Cup	—	—	—	—	—	
1895–96	—	—	—	—	—	—	—	—	—	—	—	—	—	—	—	—	—	—	
1896–97	London League Second Division ↑	16	9	6	1	42	19	24	2 of 9	QR2	—	—	—	Field	8	Field	14	—	
1897–98	London League First Division	16	12	2	2	43	17	26	2 of 9	QR2	—	—	London Senior Cup, Middlesex Senior Cup	Field	11	Field	26	—	(Note: Brentford were elected to the Southern League Second Division at the end of the season.)
1898–99	Southern League Second Division London	22	11	3	8	59	39	25	4 of 12	QR3	—	—	—	Booth Dailley C. Ward	9	Booth Dailley	12	—	(Note: Ernest Booth, Richard Dailley and C. Ward top-scored in league matches with 9 goals each.)
1899–1900	Southern League Second Division	20	5	7	8	31	48	17	9 of 11	QR3	—	—	—	E. Andrews	7	E. Andrews Dailley	7	—	
1900–01	Southern League Second Division ↑	16	14	2	0	63	11	30	1 of 9	QR4	—	—	—	Turnbull	15	Turnbull	15	—	(Note: Brentford were promoted to the Southern League First Division after drawing 0–0 with Swindon Town in a promotion-relegation test match.)
1901–02	Southern League First Division	30	7	6	17	34	61	20	15 of 16	QR4	—	—	—	Shanks	9	Shanks	10	—	(Note: Brentford retained its Southern League First Division status after a 0–0 draw with Grays United in a promotion-relegation test match. The club also competed in the London League Second Division during the season.)
1902–03	Southern League First Division	30	2	1	27 ♠	16	84	5	16 of 16	IR	—	—	—	Maher Underwood	3	Shanks	9	—	(Note: Brentford retained its Southern League First Division status after a 7–2 win over Fulham in a promotion-relegation test match. Tosher Underwood and Davie Maher finished as joint-top goalscorers in league matches, with three goals each. The club also competed in the Western League First Division and the London League Premier Division during the season.)
1903–04	Southern League First Division	34	9	9	16	34	48	27	13 of 18	IR	—	—	—	Buchanan Underwood	6	Buchanan Underwood	10	—	(Note: Brentford also competed in the Western League First Division and the London League Premier Division during the season.)
1904–05	Southern League First Division	34	10	9	15	33	38	29	14 of 18	IR	—	—	—	Shanks	7	Shanks	7	—	(Note: Brentford also competed in the Western League First Division during the season.)
1905–06	Southern League First Division	34	14	7	13	43	52	35	9 of 18	R3	—	—	—	Corbett	11	Corbett	15	—	
1906–07	Southern League First Division	38	17	8	13	57	56	42	10 of 20	R3	—	—	—	Corbett	15	Corbett	16	—	(Note: Brentford also competed in the Western League First Division A during the season.)
1907–08	Southern League First Division	38	14	5	19	49	53	33	16 of 20	R1	—	—	—	Bowman	21	Bowman	22	—	
1908–09	Southern League First Division	40	13	7	20	59	74	33	21 of 21	R2	—	—	Southern Professional Charity Cup	G. Reid	18	G. Reid	18	—	(Note: Brentford also competed in the Western League First Division B during the season.)
1909–10	Southern League First Division	42	16	9	17	50	58	41	14 of 22	QR5	—	—	—	G. Reid	17	G. Reid	19	—	
1910–11	Southern League First Division	38	14	9	15	41	42	37	12 of 20	R1	—	—	Ealing Hospital Cup	G. Reid	21	G. Reid	21	—	
1911–12	Southern League First Division	38	12	9	17	60	65	33	14 of 20	R1	—	—	—	Rippon	17	Rippon	20	—	
1912–13	Southern League First Division ↓	38	11	5	22	42	55	27	19 of 20	QR4	—	—	—	Smith	12	Smith	12	—	
1913–14	Southern League Second Division	30	20	4	6	80	18	44	3 of 16	QR5	—	—	—	Simons	19	Simons	19	—	
1914–15	Southern League Second Division	24	8	7	9	35	45	23	7 of 13	QR5	—	—	—	White	7	White	7	—	
1915–19	Competitive football was suspended in Britain for the duration of the First World War. Brentford competed in the London Combination and won the league title in 1918–19. Henry White top-scored during the war years, with 56 goals.																		
1919–20	Southern League First Division	42	15	10	17	52	59	40	15 of 22	R1	—	—	—	Boyne	13	Boyne	13	—	
1920–21	Third Division #	42	9	12	21	42	67	30	21 of 22	R1	—	—	—	King	17	King	18	8,660	(Note: Brentford were re-elected to the Football League at the end of the season.)
1921–22	Third Division South	42	16	11	15	52	43	43	9 of 22	R1	—	—	—	Morris	16	Morris	17	9,115	
1922–23	Third Division South	42	13	12	17	41	51	38	14 of 22	QR6	—	—	—	Morris	13	Morris	13	8,350	
1923–24	Third Division South	42	14	8	20	54	71	36	17 of 22	QR6	—	—	—	Parker	18	Parker	20	6,825	
1924–25	Third Division South #	42	9	7	26	38	91	25	21 of 22	QR5	—	—	—	Allen	14	Allen	14	7,010	
1925–26	Third Division South	42	16	6	20	69	94 ♠	38	18 of 22	R2	—	—	—	E. Watkins	11	E. Watkins	11	9,146	
1926–27	Third Division South	42	13	14	15	70	61	40	11 of 22	R5	—	—	—	E. Watkins	20	E. Watkins	24	9,713	
1927–28	Third Division South	42	16	8	18	76	74	40	12 of 22	R3	—	—	—	J. Phillips	17	J. Phillips	17	7,331	
1928–29	Third Division South	42	14	10	18	56	60	38	13 of 22	R2	—	—	London Charity Fund	E. Watkins	14	E. Watkins	14	8,159	
1929–30	Third Division South	42	28 ♠	5	9	94	44	61	2 of 22	R1	—	—	—	W. Lane	33	W. Lane	33	12,123	
1930–31	Third Division South	42	22	6	14	90	64	50	3 of 22	R4	—	—	—	W. Lane	24	W. Lane	29	8,236	
1931–32	Third Division South	42	19	10	13	68	52	48	5 of 22	R4	—	—	—	W. Lane	22	W. Lane	27	11,347	
1932–33	Third Division South ↑	42	26	10	6	90	49	62	1 of 22	R1	—	—	—	Holliday	38 ♠	Holliday	39 ♠	13,300	
1933–34	Second Division	42	22	7	13	85	60	51	4 of 22	R3	—	—	—	Holliday	27	Holliday	27	16,377	
1934–35	Second Division ↑	42	26	9	7	93	48	61	1 of 22	R3	—	—	London Challenge Cup	Holliday	25	Holliday	25	18.062	
1935–36	First Division	42	17	12	13	81	60	46	5 of 22 ♠	R3	—	—	—	D. McCulloch	26	D. McCulloch	26	25,287	
1936–37	First Division	42	18	10	14	82	78	46	6 of 22	R4	—	—	—	D. McCulloch	31	D. McCulloch	33	24,544	
1937–38	First Division	42	18	9	15	69	59	45	6 of 22	QF ♠	—	—	—	D. McCulloch	26	D. McCulloch	29	23,335	(Note: Brentford topped the First Division table for 16 consecutive matches during the season.)
1938–39	First Division	42	14	8	20	53	74	36	18 of 22	R3	—	—	—	Cheetham	8	Cheetham	8	23,117	(Note: Cheetham was also Queens Park Rangers' top scorer during the 1938–39 season.)
1939–45	Competitive football was suspended in Britain for the duration of the Second World War. Brentford competed in the Football League South and other regional leagues. The club competed in the London War Cup in 1940–41 and 1941–42, reaching the final on both occasions and winning the latter tournament. Len Townsend top-scored during the war years, with 49 goals.																		
1945–46	—	—	—	—	—	—	—	—	—	QF ♠	—	—	—	—		McAloon	6	—	
1946–47	First Division ↓	42	9	7	26	45	88	25	21 of 22	R4	—	—	—	Townsend	8	Townsend	9	25,768 ♠	
1947–48	Second Division	42	13	14	15	44	61	40	15 of 22	R4	—	—	—	Gibbons	13	Gibbons	14	23,341	
1948–49	Second Division	42	11	14	17	42	53	36	18 of 22	QF ♠	—	—	—	Monk	11	Monk	13	22,755	
1949–50	Second Division	42	15	13	14	44	49	43	9 of 22	R3	—	—	—	Dare	14	Dare	14	22,613	
1950–51	Second Division	42	18	8	16	75	74	44	9 of 22	R3	—	—	—	Dare	16	Dare	16	19,593	
1951–52	Second Division	42	15	12	15	54	55	42	10 of 22	R4	—	—	—	Dare	14	Dare	16	23,022	
1952–53	Second Division	42	13	11	18	59	76	37	17 of 22	R4	—	—	—	Lawton	13	Lawton	15	17,474	
1953–54	Second Division ↓	42	10	11	21	40	78	31	21 of 22	R3	—	—	—	Dudley	10	Dudley	11	15,626	
1954–55	Third Division South	46	16	14	16	82	82	46	11 of 24	R4	—	—	—	Dudley	18	Dudley	20	11,077	
1955–56	Third Division South	46	19	14	13	69	66	52	6 of 24	R2	—	—	—	Towers	21	Towers	22	10,302	
1956–57	Third Division South	46	16	16	14	78	76	48	8 of 24	R2	—	—	—	Francis	23	Francis	24	11,482	
1957–58	Third Division South	46	24	10	12	82	56	58	2 of 24	R1	—	—	—	Towers	29	Towers	29	13,084	
1958–59	Third Division	46	21	15	10	76	49	57	3 of 24	R4	—	—	—	Towers	32 †	Towers	37	13,924	
1959–60	Third Division	46	21	9	16	78	61	51	6 of 24	R2	—	—	—	Francis	26	Francis	31	11,912	
1960–61	Third Division	46	13	17	16	56	70	43	17 of 24	R1	R3	—	—	Towers	21	Towers	22	7,392	
1961–62	Third Division ↓	46	13	8	25	53	93	34	23 of 24	R3	R1	—	—	Francis	14	Francis	15	8,483	
1962–63	Fourth Division ↑	46	27	8	11	98 ♠	64	62	1 of 24	R1	R2	—	—	Dick	23	Dick	24	11,418	(Note: The 1962–63 Fourth Division title win made Brentford the first club in English football to win each of the Second, Third and Fourth Division championships.)
1963–64	Third Division	46	15	14	17	87	80	44	16 of 24	R4	R2	—	—	D. Ward	19	D. Ward	22	11,883	
1964–65	Third Division	46	24	9	13	83	55	57	5 of 24	R3	R1	—	London Challenge Cup	Cobb	15	Cobb	18	10,740	
1965–66	Third Division ↓	46	10	12	24	48	69	32	23 of 24	R2	R2	—	—	Lawther	10	Lawther	11	8,416	
1966–67	Fourth Division	46	18	13	15	58	56	49	9 of 24	R3	R2	—	London Challenge Cup	Docherty	13	Docherty	19	6,727	
1967–68	Fourth Division	46	18	7	21	61	64	43	14 of 24	R1	R1	—	—	Docherty Lawther	11	Docherty	12	6,211	
1968–69	Fourth Division	46	18	12	16	64	65	48	11 of 24	R2	R3	—	—	Mansley	14	Mansley	17	6,419	
1969–70	Fourth Division	46	20	16	10	58	39	56	5 of 24	R1	R1	—	—	Ross	13	Ross	13	7,773	
1970–71	Fourth Division	46	18	8	20	66	62	44	14 of 24	R5	R1	—	—	Ross	15	Ross	16	6,776	
1971–72	Fourth Division ↑	46	24	11	11	76	44	59	3 of 24	R1	R1	—	—	O'Mara	25	O'Mara	28	11,738	
1972–73	Third Division ↓	46	15	7	24	51	69	37	22 of 24	R1	R2	—	—	Docherty Murray	7	Docherty	8	8,742	
1973–74	Fourth Division	46	12	16	18	48	50	40	19 of 24	R1	R1	—	—	Cross	17	Cross	17	5,063	(Note: A 4–1 defeat to Scunthorpe United on 27 October 1973 dropped Brentford to bottom place in Fourth Division, which made the club the first to occupy top and bottom places in the Football League.)
1974–75	Fourth Division	46	18	13	15	53	45	49	8 of 24	R2	R2	—	—	Simmons	12	Simmons	13	5,172	
1975–76	Fourth Division	46	14	13	19	56	60	41	18 of 24	R3	R2	—	—	Cross	14	Cross	16	5,096	
1976–77	Fourth Division	46	18	7	21	77	76	43	15 of 24	R2	R1	—	—	Sweetzer	23	Sweetzer	23	5,121	
1977–78	Fourth Division ↑	46	21	14	11	86	54	56	4 of 24	R2	R1	—	—	S. Phillips	32 ♦†	S. Phillips	36	8,578	(Note: Phillips' 32 league goals tied him with Alan Curtis of Swansea City as the top goalscorer in the Football League. Brentford was the only club in the top four divisions to finish the season with two players scoring over 20 league goals – Steve Phillips (32) and Andrew McCulloch (22).)
1978–79	Third Division	46	19	9	18	53	49	47	10 of 24	R1	R1	—	—	S. Phillips A. McCulloch	14	S. Phillips A. McCulloch	14	7,455	
1979–80	Third Division	46	15	11	20	59	73	41	19 of 24	R1	R1	—	—	S. Phillips	12	S. Phillips	12	7,818	
1980–81	Third Division	46	14	19 ♠	13	52	49	47	9 of 24	R2	R1	—	—	Booker	7	Booker Crown Funnell	8	6,752	(Note: Brentford finished the season with a superior record away from home in league matches.)
1981–82	Third Division	46	19	11	16	56	47	68	8 of 24	R2	R1	—	—	Bowen Johnson Roberts	8	Bowen	10	5,693	
1982–83	Third Division	46	18	10	18	88	77	64	9 of 24	R2	R4	—	—	Joseph	24	Joseph	26	6,184	(Note: The 107 goals scored in all competitions during the 1982–83 season is a club record. The club competed in the Football League Group Cup during the season and was eliminated in the group stage.)
1983–84	Third Division	46	11	16	19	69	79	49	20 of 24	R3	R2	R2S	—	Joseph	18	Joseph	24	4,735	
1984–85	Third Division	46	16	14	16	62	64	62	13 of 24	R3	R2	RU	—	Cassells Cooke	12	Cassells Roberts	18	4,074	(Note: Cooke was also Cambridge United's top scorer during the 1984–85 season.)
1985–86	Third Division	46	18	12	16	58	61	66	10 of 24	R1	R2	GrpS	—	Cooke	17	Cooke	18	3,957	
1986–87	Third Division	46	15	15	16	64	66	60	11 of 24	R2	R1	QFS	—	Cooke	20	Cooke	25	3,918	
1987–88	Third Division	46	16	14	16	53	59	62	12 of 24	R1	R1	R1S	—	Sinton	11	Sinton	12	4,581	
1988–89	Third Division	46	18	14	14	66	61	68	7 of 24	QF ♠	R2	SFS	—	Cadette	12	Cadette	17	5,682	
1989–90	Third Division	46	18	7	21	66	66	61	13 of 24	R1	R2	QFS	—	Holdsworth	24	Holdsworth	28	5,662	
1990–91	Third Division ‡	46	21	13	12	59	47	76	6 of 24	R3	R2	FS	—	Blissett	10	Blissett	15	6,144	(Note: Brentford failed to achieve promotion after a 3–2 aggregate defeat to Tranmere Rovers in the 1991 Third Division play-off semi-finals.)
1991–92	Third Division ↑	46	25	7	14	81	55	82	1 of 24	R2	R3	R1S	—	Holdsworth	24 †	Holdsworth	38	7,156	(Note: Holdsworth's 24 league goals tied him with Iwan Roberts of Huddersfield Town as the top goalscorer in the Third Division.)
1992–93	First Division ↓	46	13	10	23	52	71	49	22 of 24	R3	R2	—	—	Blissett	21	Blissett	29	8,476	(Note: Brentford competed in the 1992–93 Anglo-Italian Cup and were knocked out on away goals after drawing 5–5 on aggregate with Derby County in the semi-finals.)
1993–94	Second Division	46	13	19 ♠	14	57	55	58	16 of 24	R2	R1	QFS	—	Allon	13	Allon	17	5,611	
1994–95	Second Division ‡	46	25	10	11	81	39	85	2 of 24	R1	R2	R2S	—	Forster	24	Forster	26	6,536	(Note: The reduction of the Premier League to 20 clubs for the 1995–96 season required a restructuring of the league pyramid during the 1994–95 season, with only one automatic promotion place allocated to the Second Division. Brentford's finish as runners-up (which would have secured automatic promotion in any other third-tier season since 1958–59) saw the club secure the top play-off place. Brentford failed to achieve promotion after losing on penalties to Huddersfield Town in the 1995 Second Division play-off semi-finals. Brentford was the only club in the top four divisions to finish the season with two players scoring over 20 league goals – Nicky Forster (24) and Robert Taylor (23).)
1995–96	Second Division	46	15	13	18	43	49	58	15 of 24	R4	R2	R2S	—	Taylor	11	Taylor	16	4,768	
1996–97	Second Division ‡	46	20	14	12	56	43	74	4 of 24	R3	R2	QFS	—	Asaba	23	Asaba	24	5,824	(Note: Brentford finished the season with a superior record away from home in league matches. Brentford failed to achieve promotion after a 1–0 defeat to Crewe Alexandra in the 1997 Second Division play-off final.)
1997–98	Second Division ↓	46	11	17	18	50	71	50	21 of 24	R1	R2	R2S	—	Taylor	13	Taylor	18	5,029	
1998–99	Third Division ↑	46	26	7	13	79	56	85	1 of 24	R2	R2	QFS	—	Owusu	22	Owusu	26	5,445	
1999–2000	Second Division	46	13	13	20	47	61	52	17 of 24	R1	R1	SFS	—	Owusu	12	Owusu	14	5,742	
2000–01	Second Division	46	14	17	15	56	70	59	14 of 24	R1	R2	RU	—	Scott	13	Scott	15	4,644	
2001–02	Second Division ‡	46	24	11	11	77	43	83	3 of 24	R2	R2	R1S	—	Owusu	20	Owusu	22	6,714	(Note: Brentford failed to achieve promotion after a 2–0 defeat to Stoke City in the 2002 Second Division play-off final.)
2002–03	Second Division	46	14	12	20	47	56	54	16 of 24	R4	R2	SFS	—	Vine	10	Vine	13	5,759	
2003–04	Second Division	46	14	11	21	52	69	53	17 of 24	R2	R1	R2S	—	Hunt	11	Hunt	13	5,592	
2004–05	League One ‡	46	22	9	15	57	60	75	4 of 24	R5	R1	R1S	—	Burton	10	Burton Rankin	10	6,082	(Note: Brentford failed to achieve promotion after a 3–1 aggregate defeat to Sheffield Wednesday in the 2005 League One play-off semi-finals.)
2005–06	League One ‡	46	20	16	10	72	52	76	3 of 24	R5	R1	R1S	—	Owusu	12	Owusu	14	6,775	(Note: Brentford failed to achieve promotion after a 3–1 aggregate defeat to Swansea City in the 2006 League One play-off semi-finals.)
2006–07	League One ↓	46	8	13	25	40	79	37	24 of 24	R1	R2	R2S	—	Kuffour	12	Kuffour	14	5,600	
2007–08	League Two	46	17	8	21	52	70	59	14 of 24	R1	R1	R1S	—	Poole	14	Poole	14	4,469	
2008–09	League Two ↑	46	23	16	7	65	36	85	1 of 24	R2	R1	R2S	—	MacDonald	16	MacDonald	18	5,707	
2009–10	League One	46	14	10	12	55	52	62	9 of 24	R3	R1	R1S	—	MacDonald	15	MacDonald	17	6,018	
2010–11	League One	46	17	10	19	55	62	61	11 of 24	R1	R4	RU	—	Alexander MacDonald	9	Alexander	12	5,172	
2011–12	League One	46	18	13	15	63	51	67	9 of 24	R2	R1	SFS	—	Alexander	12	Alexander	14	5,643	
2012–13	League One ‡	46	21	16	9	62	47	79	3 of 24	R4	R1	QFS	—	Donaldson	18	Donaldson	24	6,303	(Note: Brentford failed to achieve promotion after a 2–1 defeat to Yeovil Town in the 2013 League One play-off final.)
2013–14	League One ↑	46	28 ♠	10	8	72	43	94 ♠	2 of 24	R2	R2	R2S	—	Donaldson	17	Donaldson	18	7,715	
2014–15	Championship ‡	46	23	9	14	78	59	78	5 of 24	R3	R2	—	—	Gray	16	Gray	18	10,822	(Note: Brentford failed to achieve promotion after a 5–1 aggregate defeat to Middlesbrough in the 2015 Championship play-off semi-finals.)
2015–16	Championship	46	19	8	19	72	67	65	9 of 24	R3	R1	—	—	Judge Vibe	14	Judge Vibe	14	10,310	
2016–17	Championship	46	18	10	18	75	65	64	10 of 24	R4	R1	—	—	Vibe	15	Vibe	16	10,467	
2017–18	Championship	46	18	15	13	62	52	69	9 of 24	R3	R3	—	—	Maupay	12	Maupay	13	10,234	
2018–19	Championship	46	17	13	16	73	59	64	11 of 24	R5	R3	—	—	Maupay	25	Maupay	28	10,257	
2019–20	Championship ‡	46	24	9	13	80	38	81	3 of 24	R4	R1	—	—	O. Watkins	25	O. Watkins	26	9,156	(Note: Brentford failed to achieve promotion after a 2–1 defeat to Fulham in the 2020 Championship play-off final.)
2020–21	Championship ↑	46	24	15	7	79	42	87	3 of 24	R4	SF ♠	—	—	Toney	31 †	Toney	33	2,000	(Note: Brentford were promoted after a 2–0 win over Swansea City in the 2021 Championship play-off final.)
2021–22	Premier League	38	13	7	18	48	56	46	13 of 20	R4	QF	—	—	Toney	12	Toney	14	17,094	
2022–23	Premier League	38	15	14	9	58	46	59	9 of 20	R3	R3	—	—	Toney	20	Toney	21	17,064	
2023–24	Premier League	38	10	9	19	56	65	39	16 of 20	R3	R3	—	—	Wissa	12	Wissa	12	17,082	
2024–25	Premier League	38	16	8	14	66	57	56	10 of 20	R3	QF	—	—	Mbeumo	20	Mbeumo Wissa	20	17,099	
2025–26	Premier League	38	14	11	13	55	52	53	9 of 20	R5	QF	—	—	Thiago	22	Thiago	25	17,132	
