= 1902–03 Brentford F.C. season =

English football team season

Brentford
1902–03 season
- Chairman: Charlie Dorey
- Stadium: York Road
- Southern League First Division: 16th
- FA Cup: Intermediate round
- Top goalscorer: League: Maher, Underwood (3); All: Shanks (9)
Home colours

During the 1902–03 English football season, Brentford competed in the Southern League First Division. An appalling season led to a bottom-place finish in the First Division, but the Bees retained their First Division status with a victory over Second Division champions Fulham in a promotion-relegation test match.

== Season summary ==
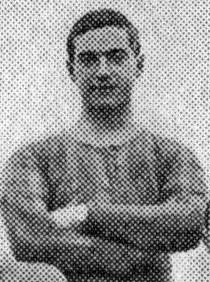
Tommy Shanks' eighth goal in seven FA Cup appearances came against Woolwich Arsenal, who signed him in part-exchange for Joe Connor in January 1903.

After a rude awakening to the Southern League First Division during the previous season and despite having become a professional club in 1900, the Brentford committee continued with an amateur attitude with regards to the running of first team affairs. Despite almost all of the First Division clubs utilising a first team manager, the committee would continue to run first team affairs. Had Brentford been relegated at the end of the previous season, the £557 loss on the season (equivalent to £59,200 in 2025) would have spelt the end of the club, but attendances had almost doubled at York Road and gate receipts of £1,244 were taken (£132,200 in 2025). Frustratingly, Brentford's promotion to the First Division had necessitated a trebling of the wage bill, which offset the increased gate receipts. To increase revenue, the club would also enter into the London League and Western League during the season and the squad was expanded to 26 professionals, which led to a 60% expansion of the wage bill. Previous regulars Grieve, Logan, McEleny, McElhaney and captain Stormont all left the club and were replaced by full backs Gilson, Nidd, half backs Green, Newsome and forwards Maher, Pickering, Turner and Underwood.

Brentford began the First Division season in even worse form than it had the last, losing the first 9 matches. Bristol City trainer Bob Crone was brought in to replace Tom King and while the team's fitness improved, its form did not. The FA Cup provided a welcome distraction and the team's form belied that of in the league, scoring 16 goals in six matches to advance from the third qualifying round to the intermediate round and a matchup with Football League First Division club Woolwich Arsenal. The Bees took the Gunners to a replay at the Manor Ground, but the run ended with a 5–0 defeat. While the cup exploits had inspired Brentford to a first league victory of the season on 22 November 1902, it had raised the profile of forward Tommy Shanks, who had scored in 9 goals in a 10-match spell through November and December 1902.

1903 began with the shock transfer of Tommy Shanks to Woolwich Arsenal, with Brentford receiving £200 and forward Joe Connor, who on 21 March 1903 would become Brentford's first international player when he played and scored for Ireland in a 2–0 victory over Scotland. The Bees took just 3 points from a possible 34 during the rest of the season and finished bottom of the First Division, which led to a promotion-relegation test match versus Second Division champions Fulham on 28 April. The team put in its best performance of the season to run out 7–2 victors, with Joe Connor scoring four goals.

Statistically, 1902–03 was Brentford's worst Southern League season, winning just twice and drawing once. A number of club records were set or equalled during the season:

- Most Southern League home defeats in a season: 12
- Most Southern League away defeats in a season: 0
- Least Southern League wins in a season: 2
- Least Southern League home wins in a season: 2
- Least Southern League away wins in a season: 0
- Least Southern League draws in a season: 1
- Least Southern League home draws in a season: 1
- Least Southern League away draws in a season: 0
- Most FA Cup goals in a season: 8 – Tommy Shanks

== League table ==
Pos	Team	Pld	W	D	L	GF	GA	GR	Pts	Qualification
12	Swindon Town	30	10	7	13	38	46	0.826	27	
13	Kettering	30	8	11	11	33	40	0.825	27	
14	Wellingborough	30	11	3	16	36	56	0.643	25	
15	Watford	30	6	4	20	35	87	0.402	16	Relegation test matches
16	Brentford	30	2	1	27	16	84	0.190	5	Relegation test matches

Source: rsssf.com
Rules for classification: The system of using goal average to separate two teams tied on points was used until the 1976-77 season. The points system: 2 points for a win, 1 point for a draw and 0 points for losing.

== Results ==
Brentford's goal tally listed first.

=== Legend ===
Win	Draw	Loss

=== Southern League First Division ===
No.	Date	Opponent	Venue	Result	Scorer(s)
1	6 September 1902	Southampton	A	0–6	
2	13 September 1902	Wellingborough	A	0–3	
3	20 September 1902	Bristol Rovers	H	0–2	
4	27 September 1902	Northampton Town	A	0–2	
5	4 October 1902	Watford	H	2–3	Pickering (2)
6	11 October 1902	Millwall Athletic	A	1–3	Regan (pen)
7	18 October 1902	Tottenham Hotspur	A	1–3	Regan (pen)
8	25 October 1902	West Ham United	H	0–3	
9	8 November 1902	New Brompton	H	1–2	Shanks
10	22 November 1902	Kettering	H	2–0	Maher (2)
11	6 December 1902	Reading	H	0–3	
12	20 December 1902	Southampton	H	0–4	
13	27 December 1902	Wellingborough	H	1–2	Warren
14	3 January 1903	Bristol Rovers	A	0–2	
15	10 January 1903	Northampton Town	H	0–2	
16	17 January 1903	Watford	A	1–3	Connor
17	24 January 1903	Millwall Athletic	H	1–4	Connor
18	31 January 1903	Tottenham Hotspur	H	1–1	Warren
19	7 February 1903	West Ham United	A	0–2	
20	14 February 1903	Portsmouth	H	0–5	
21	21 February 1903	New Brompton	A	0–4	
22	28 February 1903	Swindon Town	H	1–0	Underwood
23	4 March 1903	Queens Park Rangers	A	0–3	
24	7 March 1903	Kettering	A	2–3	Warren, Turner
25	14 March 1903	Luton Town	H	1–3	Maher
26	21 March 1903	Reading	A	0–5	
27	28 March 1903	Queens Park Rangers	H	0–2	
28	11 April 1903	Portsmouth	A	1–4	Underwood
29	14 April 1903	Luton Town	A	0–2	
30	18 April 1903	Swindon Town	A	0–3	

=== Southern League Test Match ===
Date	Opponent	Venue	Result	Scorer(s)	Notes
28 April 1903	Fulham	N	7–2	Connor (3, 1 pen), Turner (2), Pickering	(Note: Match played at Wormholt Farm, Shepherd's Bush.)

=== FA Cup ===
Round	Date	Opponent	Venue	Result	Scorer(s)	Notes
3QR	1 November 1902	Oxford City	A	2–2	Regan (pen), Shanks	
3QR (replay)	5 November 1902	Oxford City	H	5–4	Maher (2), Shanks (2), Pickering	
4QR	15 November 1902	Southall	H	5–0	Shanks (4), Green (pen)	
5QR	29 November 1902	Shepherd's Bush	H	2–2	Green, Maher	
5QR (replay)	3 December 1902	Shepherd's Bush	A	1–1	Maher	
5QR (2nd replay)	8 December 1902	Shepherd's Bush	N	1–0	Turner	(Note: Match played at Kensal Rise.)
IR	13 December 1902	Woolwich Arsenal	H	1–1	Shanks	
IR (replay)	17 December 1902	Woolwich Arsenal	A	0–5		

- Source: 100 Years of Brentford

== Playing squad ==
Note: Flags indicate national team as defined under FIFA eligibility rules; some limited exceptions apply. Players may hold more than one non-FIFA nationality.

Pos.	Nation	Player
GK	SCO	John Bishop
GK	ENG	Billy Green
GK	ENG	Tommy Spicer
DF		Ball
DF	IRL	Bob Crone
DF	ENG	Harry Dutfield
DF	ENG	Alf Gilson
DF	SCO	William Halley
DF	ENG	Fred Nidd
MF	ENG	Ellis Green (c)
MF	ENG	William Hainsworth
MF	ENG	Harry Harris
MF	ENG	Bill Keech
MF	ENG	Arthur Newsome
MF	ENG	Bill Regan

Pos.	Nation	Player
MF		E. Roberts
MF	ENG	Thomas Shufflebotham
MF	ENG	Frederick Williams
FW	ENG	E. Andrews
FW	SCO	John Bayne
FW	ENG	Charles Carr
FW	ENG	William Childs
FW	IRL	Joe Connor
FW	IRL	Frederick Jordan
FW	ENG	Horace Jury
FW	ENG	Davie Maher
FW	ENG	George Pickering
FW	ENG	Percy Turner
FW	ENG	Tosher Underwood
FW	ENG	Leonard Walker

=== Left club during season ===
Note: Flags indicate national team as defined under FIFA eligibility rules; some limited exceptions apply. Players may hold more than one non-FIFA nationality.

Pos. / Nation / Player; FW / IRL / Tommy Shanks (to Woolwich Arsenal)	Pos. / Nation / Player; FW / ENG / Arnold Warren (to Ripley Town)

- Source: 100 Years of Brentford, The Football Association

== Coaching staff ==
Name	Role
(Ireland) Bob Crone	Trainer

== Statistics ==
=== Appearances ===

Brentford's highest appearance-makers in each position during the Southern League season.

=== Goalscorers ===
Pos.	Nat	Player	SL1	FAC	TM	Total
FW	(Ireland)	Tommy Shanks	1	8	—	9
FW	(England)	Davie Maher	3	4	0	7
FW	(Ireland)	Joe Connor	2	0	4	6
FW	(England)	George Pickering	2	1	1	4
FW	(England)	Percy Turner	1	1	2	4
FW	(England)	Tosher Underwood	3	0	0	3
HB	(England)	Bill Regan	2	1	0	3
FW	(England)	Arnold Warren	2	0	—	2
HB	(England)	Ellis Green	0	2	0	2
Total			16	17	7	40

- Players listed in italics left the club mid-season.
- Source: 100 Years Of Brentford

=== International caps ===
Pos.	Nat	Player	Caps	Goals	Ref
FW	(Ireland)	Joe Connor	2	1	

=== Management ===
Name	From	To	Record All Comps					Record League				
Name	From	To	P	W	D	L	W %	P	W	D	L	W %
Committee	6 September 1902	28 April 1903	39	6	5	28	15.38	30	2	1	27	6.67

=== Summary ===
Games played	39 (30 Southern League First Division, 1 Southern League Test Match, 8 FA Cup)
Games won	6 (2 Southern League First Division, 1 Southern League Test Match, 3 FA Cup)
Games drawn	5 (1 Southern League First Division, 0 Southern League Test Match, 4 FA Cup)
Games lost	28 (27 Southern League First Division, 0 Southern League Test Match, 1 FA Cup)
Goals scored	40 (16 Southern League First Division, 7 Southern League Test Match, 17 FA Cup)
Goals conceded	101 (84 Southern League First Division, 2 Southern League Test Match, 15 FA Cup)
Clean sheets	4 (2 Southern League First Division, 0 Southern League Test Match, 2 FA Cup)
Biggest league win	2–0 versus Kettering, 22 November 1902
Worst league defeat	6–0 versus Southampton, 6 September 1902
Most appearances	38, Davie Maher (29 Southern League First Division, 1 Southern League Test Match, 8 FA Cup)
Top scorer (league)	3, Davie Maher, Tosher Underwood
Top scorer (all competitions)	9, Tommy Shanks
