= Bill Green =

Bill or Billy Green may refer to:

== Politics and law ==
- Bill Green Jr. (1910–1963), American politician
- Bill Green (New York politician) (Sedgwick William Green, 1929–2002), U.S. Representative from New York
- Bill Green III (born 1938), American politician
- Bill Green IV (born 1965), American politician in Pennsylvania

== Sports ==
=== Association football (soccer) ===
- Bill Green (footballer, born 1950) (1950–2017), English professional footballer and manager
- Billy Green (footballer, born 1881) (1881–1951), English football goalkeeper
- Billy Green (footballer, born 1927) (1927–1996), English football defender

=== Australian rules football ===
- Bill Green (footballer, born 1914) (1914–1981), Australian rules footballer for Essendon
- Bill Green (footballer, born 1932), Australian rules footballer for Richmond
- Billy Green (Australian footballer) (1910–1995), Australian rules footballer for St Kilda

=== Other sports ===
- Bill Green (basketball) (1940–1994), American college basketball player
- Bill Green (hammer thrower) (born 1960), American Olympic hammer thrower
- Bill Green (sprinter) (1961–2012), American sprinter
- Billy Green (sprinter) (1904–1981), British Olympic sprinter

== Others ==
- Bill Green (entrepreneur), American entrepreneur and author
- Bill Green (musician) (1925–1996), American jazz musician
- Bill Green (RAF officer) (1917–2014), British pilot during the Battle of Britain
- Billy Green (scout) (1794–1877), Canadian soldier
- Billy Green Bush (born 1935), American actor
- Billy Joe Green, Anishinaabe rock and blues musician from Canada
- Bill Green, a character in the Disney Channel TV show Big City Greens

== See also ==
- William Green (disambiguation)
- Will Green (disambiguation)
