= William Green =

William Green may refer to

== Arts and entertainment ==
- William Green (action painter) (1934–2001), British artist
- William Green (painter, born 1760) (1760–1823), British artist
- William Green (piper) (1775–1860), Northumbrian piper
- William Clark Green (born 1986), American country music singer
- William Curtis Green (1875–1960), English architect
- William Ellis Green (1923–2008), Australian cartoonist
- Bill Green (musician) (William Earnest Green, 1925–1996), American jazz musician

== Military ==
- Sir William Green, 1st Baronet (1725–1811), British army officer
- William Green (British Army soldier) (1784–1881), English veteran of the Napoleonic wars
- William Green (British Army officer, born 1882) (1882–1947), British Army major-general
- William Green Jr. (chaplain), 26th Chief of Chaplains of the United States Army
- William Edward Green (1898–1940), British World War I flying ace
- William Henry Rodes Green (1823–1912), British Indian Army general
- Sir William Wyndham Green (1887–1979), British Army general
- Bill Green (RAF officer) (William James Green, 1917–2014), British pilot during the Battle of Britain
- Billy Green (scout) (William Green, 1794–1877), Canadian soldier

== Politics and law ==
=== U.K. ===
- William Green (fl.1406), MP for Lewes
- William Green (died 1555), MP for Downton
- William Green (MP for Poole) (fl. 1563–1572), MP for Poole
- William Lowthian Green (1819–1890), English merchant and cabinet minister in the Kingdom of Hawaii

=== U.S. ===
- William Green (lawyer) (1806–1880), Virginia lawyer, son of John W. Green
- William Comstock Green (1802–1874), American politician
- William J. Green Jr. (1910–1963), U.S. representative from Pennsylvania
- William J. Green III (born 1938), American politician, mayor of Philadelphia and U.S. representative from Pennsylvania
- Bill Green IV (William Joseph Green IV, born 1965), American politician in Philadelphia
- William R. Green (1856–1947), U.S. representative from Iowa
- William R. Green Jr. (c. 1889–1966), United States Tax Court judge
- William T. Green (1860–1911), African-American attorney and civil rights activist
- Bill Green (New York politician) (S. William Green, 1929–2002), U.S. congressman from New York

=== Elsewhere ===
- William Green (Australian politician) (1878–1968), member of the Queensland Legislative Assembly

== Sports ==
=== Cricket ===
- William Green (cricketer, born 1817) (1817–1870), English batsman playing for Kent
- William Green (cricketer, born 1834) (1834–1876), English batsman playing for Kent
- William Green (cricketer, born 1852) (1852–1924), English cricketer for Marylebone Cricket Club

=== Other sports ===
- William Green (footballer, fl. 1900-1904), see List of Bury F.C. players (1–24 appearances)
- Billy Green (footballer, born 1881) (William John Green, 1881–1951), English football goalkeeper
- Willie Green (baseball) (William Green, 1894–1925), American Negro leagues third baseman
- Billy Green (Australian footballer) (William Frederick Green, 1910–1995), Australian rules footballer for St Kilda
- Billy Green (footballer, born 1927) (William Green, 1927–1996), English football defender
- Bill Green (basketball) (William E. Green, 1940–1994), American college basketball player
- Bill Green (footballer, born 1950) (William Green, 1950–2017), English professional footballer and manager
- Bill Green (hammer thrower) (William Green, born 1960), American Olympic hammer thrower
- Bill Green (sprinter) (William Ernest Green, 1961–2012), American sprinter
- Willie Green (American football) (born 1966), American football player
- Will Green (rugby union) (born 1973), English rugby union footballer
- William Green (American football) (born 1979), American football player
- Willie Green (born 1981), American basketball player

== Science and medicine ==
- William Green (author) (1927–2010), British aviation author
- William H. Green (born 1963), American chemical engineer
- William Spotswood Green (1847–1919), Irish naturalist

== Others ==
- William Green (former slave) (c.1814–1895), African-American escaped slave and writer
- William Green (journalist), English journalist
- William Green (U.S. labor leader) (1873–1952), president of the American Federation of Labor
- William D. Green (born 1953), American businessman, chairman of Accenture
- William Henry Green (1824–1900), American Hebrew scholar
- William Mercer Green (1798–1887), American Episcopal bishop of Mississippi
- William Mercer Green (grandson) (1876–1942), American Episcopal bishop of Mississippi
- Will S. Green (1832–1905), California pioneer
- William Scott Green, American professor of religious studies
- William Allan McInnes Green (1896–1972), civil engineer and town clerk in Perth, Western Australia

== See also ==
- William Greene (disambiguation)
- Bill Green (disambiguation) for those known as Bill or Billy
- Will Green (disambiguation)
- Willie Green (disambiguation)
- William Green Jr. (disambiguation)
