= William Lewis (football) =

English football manager

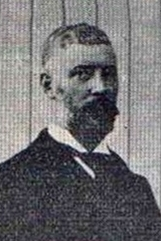
- Lewis while with Brentford in 1902.

Personal information
- Date of birth: September 1860
- Place of birth: Brentford, England
- Date of death: 6 May 1916 (aged 55)
- Place of death: Brentford, England

Managerial career
- Years: Team
- 1900–1903: Brentford
- 1903–1904: Brentford (caretaker)
- 1906–1907: Chelsea (caretaker)

William Lewis (September 1860 – 6 May 1916) was an English football referee, director, secretary and manager, active in the early 20th century. He managed Brentford and Chelsea, the latter in the Football League.

== Managerial career ==
=== Brentford ===
Lewis was named secretary-manager of Southern League Second Division club Brentford in 1900 and led them to the title and promotion to the Southern League First Division in the 1900–01 season. The Bees finished second-from-bottom in their first season in the First Division, but held onto their status in the league after a relegation playoff with Grays United was called off before going into extra time. Brentford finished bottom of the First Division in 1902–03, but once again held onto their place in the league after a 7–2 relegation playoff victory over West London rivals Fulham. Lewis stepped down from the role in May 1903 and was replaced by Richard Molyneux. Lewis covered the manager's position for Molyneux for part of the 1903–04 season, after Molyneux was suspended from football for attempting to buy a goalkeeper out of the army. Lewis remained at Brentford as secretary until 1905 and later returned to the club in an administrative capacity.

=== Chelsea ===
Lewis became the first club secretary of Chelsea when it was founded in 1905 and his contacts helped the club gain election to Football League the same year. With the resignation of player-manager John Robertson on 27 November 1906, Lewis became caretaker manager of the club, while retaining his secretarial duties. Lewis led the side to its first promotion in the 1906–07 season, finishing as Second Division runners-up to Nottingham Forest. He left the job in June 1907 and was succeeded by David Calderhead.

== Personal life ==
Lewis was a schoolteacher by profession. He died in May 1916 after a long battle with cancer.

== Honours ==
Brentford

- Southern League Second Division: 1900–01

Chelsea

- Football League Second Division second-place promotion: 1906–07
