= 1900–01 Brentford F.C. season =

English football team season

Brentford
1900–01 season
- Chairman: William Lewis
- Stadium: York Road
- Southern League Second Division: 1st (promoted)
- FA Cup: Fourth qualifying round
- Top goalscorer: League: Turnbull (15); All: Turnbull (15)

During the 1900–01 English football season, Brentford competed in the Southern League Second Division. An unbeaten league season led to Brentford topping the division, before failing to beat Swindon Town in a promotion-relegation test match. Promotion was finally assured when the club was elected into the Southern League First Division in July 1901.

== Season summary ==
Despite the final implications of jumping the hurdle from amateur to professional status during the previous season, Brentford went into the 1900–01 Southern League Second Division campaign in a healthy state. The club moved from Cross Roads (near South Ealing station) back to Brentford and would play their matches at Boston Park Cricket Club's ground York Road, a move which was beneficial for both clubs. Harry Underwood, a member of the Brentford committee, also managed to persuade a number of local tradesmen, to whom the club owed over £100 (equivalent to £10,600 in 2025), to write off the debt. Now under the charge of William Lewis as a team manager of sorts, Brentford trimmed down the playing staff and signed two new professional players – left back Harry Gilmour and inside forward Joe Turner. Because of the reduction in size of the Southern League Second Division, Brentford also entered the London League to help generate revenue.

Brentford began the Southern League season in fine form, but suffered a number of defeats in the early London League matches and consequently five new players were signed – goalkeeper Dave Clear, full back Jack Graham, half back William Hainsworth, inside right Roddy McLeod and centre forward Peter Turnbull. McLeod and Turnbull proved to be master-stroke signings and along with existing forwards Ralph McElhaney, E. Andrews and Joe Turner, the quintet fired Brentford to an unbeaten Southern League season. The Bees' 1st-place finish in the Second Division led to a test match at the end of the season versus Swindon Town, who had finished bottom of the First Division. With Brentford needing to win to secure promotion and with the score at 0–0, the match at Elm Park went into extra time and was called off after 107 minutes due to bad light.

In the aftermath of the abandoned test match, the Brentford committee resolved to apply for the place in the First Division left vacant by Bristol City, who had been elected into the Football League. Brentford were passed over in favour of Northampton Town at the Southern League's AGM on 1 June, but Gravesend United's departure from the First Division due to financial problems in July led to Brentford's election into the First Division for the 1901–02 season.

A number of club records were set during the season:

- Most Southern League away wins in a season: 7
- Least Southern League home draws in a season: 1
- Least Southern League defeats in a season: 0
- Least Southern League home defeats in a season: 0
- Least Southern League away defeats in a season: 0
- Record Southern League win: 11–1 versus Wycombe Wanderers, 16 February 1901
- Least goalscorers in all competitions in a Southern League season

== League table ==
Pos	Team	Pld	W	D	L	GF	GA	GR	Pts	Qualification or relegation
1	Brentford	16	14	2	0	63	11	5.727	30	Promotion test matches
2	Grays United	16	12	2	2	62	12	5.167	26	Promotion test matches
3	Sheppey United	16	8	1	7	44	26	1.692	17	Dropped into Kent League at end of season
4	Shepherds Bush	16	8	1	7	30	30	1.000	17	
5	Fulham London	16	8	0	8	38	26	1.462	16	
6	Chesham Town	16	5	1	10	26	39	0.667	11	
7	Maidenhead	16	4	1	11	21	49	0.429	9	
8	Wycombe Wanderers	16	4	1	11	23	68	0.338	9	
9	Southall	16	4	1	11	22	68	0.324	9	

Rules for classification: The system of using goal average to separate two teams tied on points was used up until the 1976-77 season. The points system: 2 points for a win, 1 point for a draw and 0 points for losing.

== Results ==
Brentford's goal tally listed first.

=== Legend ===
Win	Draw	Loss

=== Southern League Second Division ===
No.	Date	Opponent	Venue	Result	Scorer(s)
1	29 September 1900	Fulham	A	2–1	Andrews, Turner
2	13 October 1900	Chesham Town	A	3–0	McLeod (2), Turner
3	20 October 1900	Southall	H	0–0	
4	10 November 1900	Shepherds Bush	H	6–2	Turnbull (2), Turner (2), McLeod (2)
5	24 November 1900	Wycombe Wanderers	A	4–1	McElhaney, Turnbull (2), McLeod
6	22 December 1900	Maidenhead	A	1–0	McElhaney
7	29 December 1900	Sheppey United	H	2–0	Harris, Turnbull
8	19 January 1901	Southall	A	9–1	Turnbull (5), Andrews, McElhaney, Turner (2)
9	9 February 1901	Grays United	A	1–1	Turnbull
10	16 February 1901	Wycombe Wanderers	H	11–1	McElhaney (2), Andrews (2), Turner (3), Turnbull (2), McLeod (2)
11	2 March 1901	Fulham	H	5–1	Turner, Englefield (og), Andrews (2), McElhaney
12	9 March 1901	Sheppey United	A	5–0	Andrews, McElhaney, McLeod (2), Turnbull
13	18 March 1901	Chesham Town	H	2–1	Broughton, Andrews
14	30 March 1901	Shepherds Bush	A	2–1	McElhaney (2)
15	5 April 1901	Maidenhead	H	8–0	McLeod (3), McElhaney (2), Andrews (2), Turnbull
16	9 April 1901	Grays United	H	2–1	Turner, McLeod

=== Southern League Test Match ===
Date	Opponent	Venue	Result	Notes
29 April 1901	Swindon Town	N	0–0 (a.e.t.)	(Note: Match played at Elm Park, Reading. With the score at 0–0 after 107 minutes, the match was abandoned due to bad light.)

=== FA Cup ===
Round	Date	Opponent	Venue	Result	Scorer(s)
3QR	3 November 1900	Maidenhead	A	3–1	Dailley, McLeod, Harris
4QR	17 November 1900	Richmond Association	A	0–1	

- Source: 100 Years of Brentford

== Playing squad ==
Note: Flags indicate national team as defined under FIFA eligibility rules; some limited exceptions apply. Players may hold more than one non-FIFA nationality.

Pos.	Nation	Player
GK	ENG	Dave Clear
GK	ENG	Louis Hare
DF	SCO	Harry Gilmour
DF	ENG	Jack Graham
DF	SCO	John Haugh
DF	ENG	Percy Swann
MF	ENG	Frederick Broughton
MF	ENG	William Hainsworth
MF	ENG	Alfred Mattocks
MF	ENG	William Mehew
MF	ENG	Walter Neal
MF	ENG	Billy Smith

Pos.	Nation	Player
FW	ENG	E. Andrews
FW	ENG	Henry Beagley
FW	ENG	Richard Dailley
FW	ENG	Harry Harris
FW	ENG	William Hickman
FW	ENG	William Knight
MF	SCO	Ralph McElhaney
FW	SCO	Roddy McLeod
FW	ENG	Alfred Townsend
FW	SCO	Peter Turnbull
FW	ENG	Joe Turner

- Source: 100 Years of Brentford

== Statistics ==
=== Appearances ===

Brentford's highest appearance-makers in each position during the Southern League season.

=== Goalscorers ===
Pos.	Nat	Player	SL2	FAC	TM	Total
FW	(Scotland)	Peter Turnbull	15	0	0	15
FW	(Scotland)	Roddy McLeod	13	1	0	14
FW	(Scotland)	Ralph McElhaney	11	0	0	11
FW	(England)	Joe Turner	11	0	0	11
FW	(England)	E. Andrews	10	0	0	10
FW	(England)	Harry Harris	1	1	0	2
HB	(England)	Frederick Broughton	1	0	0	1
Opponents			1	0	0	1
Total			63	2	0	65

- Players listed in italics left the club mid-season.
- Source: 100 Years Of Brentford

=== Management ===
Name	From	To	Record All Comps					Record League				
Name	From	To	P	W	D	L	W %	P	W	D	L	W %
Committee	29 September 1900	29 April 1901	19	15	3	1	78.95	16	14	2	0	87.50

=== Summary ===
Games played	19 (16 Southern League Second Division, 1 Southern League Test Match, 2 FA Cup)
Games won	15 (14 Southern League Second Division, 0 Southern League Test Match, 1 FA Cup)
Games drawn	3 (2 Southern League Second Division, 1 Southern League Test Match, 0 FA Cup)
Games lost	1 (0 Southern League Second Division, 0 Southern League Test Match, 1 FA Cup)
Goals scored	66 (63 Southern League Second Division, 0 Southern League Test Match, 3 FA Cup)
Goals conceded	12 (11 Southern League Second Division, 0 Southern League Test Match, 1 FA Cup)
Clean sheets	7 (6 Southern League Second Division, 1 Southern League Test Match, 0 FA Cup)
Biggest league win	11–1 versus Wycombe Wanderers, 16 February 1901
Most appearances	18, E. Andrews, Frederick Broughton, Ralph McElhaney, Joe Turner (16 Southern League Second Division, 1 Southern League Test Match, 1 FA Cup)
Top scorer (league)	15, Peter Turnbull
Top scorer (all competitions)	15, Peter Turnbull
