= McEleny =

McEleny is a surname. Notable people with the surname include:

- Charlie McEleny (1873–1908), Irish footballer
- Chris McEleny (born 1985 or 1986), Scottish politician
- Maggie McEleny (born 1965), Scottish Paralympic swimmer
