= 1899–1900 Brentford F.C. season =

English football team season

Brentford
1899–1900 season
- Chairman: William Lewis
- Stadium: Cross Roads
- Southern League Second Division: 9th
- FA Cup: Third qualifying round
- Top goalscorer: League: E. Andrews (7); All: E. Andrews, Dailley (7)

During the 1899–1900 English football season, Brentford competed in the Southern League Second Division. A Middlesex FA investigation into the club's financial affairs necessitated a change to professional status mid-season, but a forgettable campaign ended with the Bees finishing third-from-bottom.

== Season summary ==
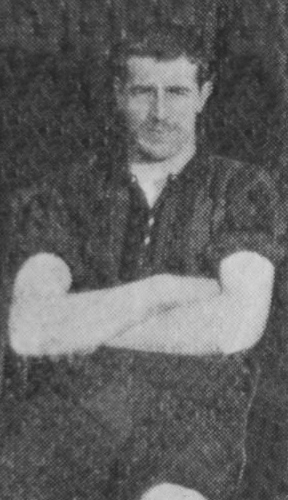
Forward Ralph McElhaney was a late-season signing from East Stirlingshire.

After a difficult first season in the Southern League Second Division, Brentford's AGM in May 1899 revealed that the club had lost £100 on the previous season, taking the overall debt to £180 (equivalent to £20,000 in 2025). After a series of meetings, a new committee was elected in July after it was decided that the club would continue to operate on an amateur basis. On the playing side, only six members of the team that finished the previous season remained at the club – goalkeeper Ben Brown, full back George Turner, half backs 'Nick' Mattocks, Billy Smith and forwards Richard Dailley, Thomas Knapman and Charlie Evans. Incoming transfers included full back Bert Lane, half back G. Pearce and forwards E. Andrews and John Bayne.

Brentford won and drew each of the opening two Second Division fixtures, with new forward John Bayne scoring in each, before he and George Turner, both soldiers, departed for service in the Second Boer War with their regiments. Things went from bad to worse in October when the Middlesex FA opened an enquiry into Brentford's "shamateurism", the results of which saw the club fined £10 and suspended from football for a month beginning 20 November. Additionally, a number of members of the club's committee were suspended sine die or until 30 April 1900. A new committee took charge of the club and elected to turn professional.

Following the resumption of competitive play on 23 December, Brentford showed appalling form, failing to win until late March 1900. A 13-match winless streak, which stretched back to 23 September, culminated in a 7–0 thrashing at the hands of Grays United on 24 March. Additionally, a meeting had been called in January to discuss if the club could even continue, but donations of £60 (equivalent to £6,700 in 2025) helped to ensure that the Bees would survive for the immediate future. Late in the season, professional half backs Frederick Broughton and Ralph McElhaney joined the club and immediately fortunes turned around on the pitch, with Brentford winning four and drawing one of the final six matches of the season to finish in 9th position, two places off the bottom.

== League table ==
Pos	Team	Pld	W	D	L	GF	GA	GR	Pts	Qualification or relegation
1	Watford	20	14	2	4	57	25	2.280	30	Promotion test matches
2	Fulham	20	10	4	6	44	23	1.913	24	Promotion test matches
3	Chesham Town	20	11	2	7	43	37	1.162	24	
4	Wolverton L&NWR	20	9	6	5	46	36	1.278	24	Left league at end of season
5	Grays United	20	8	6	6	63	29	2.172	22	
6	Shepherds Bush	20	9	4	7	45	37	1.216	22	
7	Dartford	20	8	3	9	36	44	0.818	19	Left league at end of season
8	Wycombe Wanderers	20	8	3	9	35	50	0.700	19	
9	Brentford	20	5	7	8	31	48	0.646	17	
10	Southall	20	6	3	11	21	44	0.477	15	
11	Maidenhead	20	1	2	17	16	64	0.250	4	

Source: rsssf.com
Rules for classification: The system of using goal average to separate two teams tied on points was used up until the 1976–77 season. The points system: 2 points for a win, 1 point for a draw and 0 points for losing.

== Results ==
Brentford's goal tally listed first.

=== Legend ===
Win	Draw	Loss

=== Southern League Second Division ===
No.	Date	Opponent	Venue	Result	Scorer(s)
1	9 September 1899	Wycombe Wanderers	H	1–0	Bayne
2	23 September 1899	Shepherds Bush	A	2–2	Bayne, Knapman
3	7 October 1899	Watford	A	0–4	
4	4 November 1899	Fulham	H	3–3	Knapman, E. Andrews, Dailley (pen)
5	11 November 1899	Maidenhead	A	0–2	
6	23 December 1899	Chesham	A	1–4	Harding (og)
7	30 December 1899	Fulham	A	0–5	
8	27 January 1900	Watford	H	2–2	E. Andrews, Dailley
9	8 February 1900	Grays United	H	0–5	
10	17 February 1900	Wolverton London & North Western Railway	A	1–5	Dailley
11	24 February 1900	Shepherds Bush	H	1–1	Edwards
12	3 March 1900	Southall	A	0–0	
13	17 March 1900	Chesham	H	1–1	Dailley
14	24 March 1900	Grays United	A	0–7	
15	31 March 1900	Dartford	H	4–0	Dailley (2), Asbury, E. Andrews
16	16 April 1900	Dartford	A	1–2	Mattocks
17	21 April 1900	Maidenhead	H	3–2	Asbury, E. Andrews (2)
18	26 April 1900	Wolverton London & North Western Railway	H	3–1	Allwright, Watt (2)
19	28 April 1900	Southall	H	6–0	Knapman (3), E. Andrews (2), Evans
20	30 April 1900	Wycombe Wanderers	A	2–2	Broughton, Evans

=== FA Cup ===
Round	Date	Opponent	Venue	Result	Scorer
3QR	28 October 1899	Richmond Association	H	1–2	Dailley

- Source: 100 Years of Brentford

== Playing squad ==
Note: Flags indicate national team as defined under FIFA eligibility rules; some limited exceptions apply. Players may hold more than one non-FIFA nationality.

Pos.	Nation	Player
GK	ENG	S. Andrews
GK	ENG	Ben Brown
GK	ENG	Louis Hare
GK	ENG	S. Marshall
DF	ENG	R. Davis
DF	ENG	E. Dicks
DF	ENG	Herbert Edney
DF	ENG	Bert Lane
DF	ENG	John Pilgrim
MF	ENG	R. Allen
MF	ENG	Frederick Broughton
MF	ENG	F. Dean
MF	ENG	P. Duncan
MF	ENG	Billy Green
MF		Hay
MF	ENG	Joseph Hood
MF	WAL	T. Jones
MF	ENG	J. Lucas
MF	ENG	Alfred Mattocks
MF	ENG	William Mehew

Pos.	Nation	Player
MF	SCO	Ralph McElhaney
MF	ENG	G. Pearce
MF	ENG	Billy Smith
FW	ENG	Bert Allen
FW	ENG	William Allwright
FW	ENG	E. Andrews
FW	ENG	Benjamin Asbury
FW		"Bailey"
FW	ENG	Frederick Carte
FW	ENG	Richard Dailley (c)
FW	ENG	B. Edwards
FW		Charlie Evans
FW	ENG	M. Granger
FW	ENG	Thomas Knapman
FW	ENG	J. Read
FW	ENG	John Richardson
FW	ENG	Harry Thurston
FW	ENG	Alfred Townsend
FW	ENG	S. Vincent
FW	ENG	A. Watt

=== Left club during season ===
Note: Flags indicate national team as defined under FIFA eligibility rules; some limited exceptions apply. Players may hold more than one non-FIFA nationality.

Pos. / Nation / Player; DF / SCO / George Turner	Pos. / Nation / Player; FW / SCO / John Bayne

- "Bailey" is an alias
- Source: 100 Years of Brentford

== Statistics ==
=== Appearances ===

Brentford's highest appearance-makers in each position during the Southern League season.

=== Goalscorers ===
Pos.	Nat	Player	SL2	FAC	Total
FW	(England)	E. Andrews	7	0	7
FW	(England)	Richard Dailley	6	1	7
FW	(England)	Thomas Knapman	5	0	5
FW	(Scotland)	John Bayne	2	—	2
FW	(England)	Benjamin Asbury	2	0	2
FW	n/a	Charlie Evans	2	0	2
FW	(England)	A. Watt	2	0	2
FW	(England)	William Allwright	1	0	1
HB	(England)	Frederick Broughton	1	0	1
FW	(England)	B. Edwards	1	0	1
HB	(England)	Alfred Mattocks	1	0	1
Opponents			1	0	1
Total			31	1	32

- Players listed in italics left the club mid-season.
- Source: 100 Years Of Brentford

=== Management ===
Name	From	To	Record All Comps					Record League				
Name	From	To	P	W	D	L	W %	P	W	D	L	W %
Committee	9 September 1899	30 April 1900	21	5	7	9	23.81	20	5	7	8	25.00

=== Summary ===
Games played	28 (20 Southern League Second Division, 1 FA Cup)
Games won	5 (5 Southern League Second Division, 0 FA Cup)
Games drawn	7 (7 Southern League Second Division, 0 FA Cup)
Games lost	9 (8 Southern League Second Division, 1 FA Cup)
Goals scored	32 (31 Southern League Second Division, 1 FA Cup)
Goals conceded	50 (48 Southern League Second Division, 2 FA Cup)
Clean sheets	4 (4 Southern League Second Division, 0 FA Cup)
Biggest league win	6–0 versus Southall, 28 April 1900
Worst league defeat	7–0 versus Grays United, 24 March 1900
Most appearances	17, E. Andrews, Richard Dailley (17 Southern League Second Division, 1 FA Cup)
Top scorer (league)	7, E. Andrews
Top scorer (all competitions)	7, E. Andrews, Richard Dailley
