= 1901–02 Brentford F.C. season =

English football team season

Brentford
1901–02 season
- Chairman: Charlie Dorey
- Stadium: York Road
- Southern League First Division: 15th
- FA Cup: Fourth qualifying round
- Top goalscorer: League: Shanks (9); All: Shanks (11)
Home colours

During the 1901–02 English football season, Brentford competed in the Southern League First Division. After a torrid season, the Bees were spared relegation after Second Division club Grays United forfeited promotion at the end of the campaign.

== Season summary ==
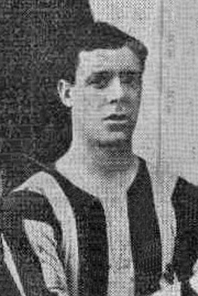
Wing half Bill Regan joined Brentford during the 1901 off-season.

Despite having won election to the Southern League First Division in July 1901, the Brentford committee did not rest on its laurels and quickly realised that the team which finished top of the Second Division during the previous season needed drastic improvement if the club was to retain its First Division status. Almost a whole new XI was signed, which included goalkeeper Tommy Spicer, full back David Robson, half backs Bill Regan, Robert Stormont, Charlie McEleny and three new forwards. Half back Ralph McElhaney and forwards E. Andrews, Roddy McLeod and Peter Turnbull, all lynchpins of the promotion team, would play a part in the upcoming season. In late August, the club was registered as a limited liability company.

Brentford began the season in poor form and it took the signings of forwards Tommy Shanks, Paddy Logan and Tom Grieve to inspire the team to its first league victory of the campaign on 9 November 1901. The result inspired three wins and three draws from a seven-match spell through to January 1902, but the team soon regained the habit of losing. Despite the loss of captain Robert Stormont due to an FA suspension and injury problems in February, Brentford struggled on until mid-April and with two matches to go, were level on points with fellow promotion-relegation test match contenders Watford, New Brompton and Wellingborough near the bottom of the First Division. The Bees closed out the season with 7–1 and 3–0 defeats to Portsmouth and Tottenham Hotspur respectively, the top two sides in the First Division. Brentford's 15th-place finish led to a promotion-relegation test match with Grays United, in which the Second Division side forfeited promotion by refusing to play extra time while the score was at 1–1, which preserved the Bees' First Division status.

One club record was set during the season:

- Least Southern League away wins in a season: 0

== League table ==
| Pos | Team | Pld | W | D | L | GF | GA | GR | Pts | Qualification |
|---|---|---|---|---|---|---|---|---|---|---|
| 12 | Queens Park Rangers | 30 | 9 | 6 | 15 | 34 | 55 | 0.618 | 24 | |
| 13 | Watford | 30 | 9 | 4 | 17 | 36 | 58 | 0.621 | 22 | |
| 14 | Wellingborough | 30 | 9 | 3 | 18 | 34 | 72 | 0.472 | 21 | |
| 15 | Brentford | 30 | 7 | 6 | 17 | 34 | 61 | 0.557 | 20 | Relegation test matches |
| 16 | Swindon Town | 30 | 2 | 3 | 25 | 17 | 92 | 0.185 | 7 | Relegation test matches |

Source: rsssf.com
Rules for classification: The system of using goal average to separate two teams tied on points was used until the 1976-77 season. The points system: 2 points for a win, 1 point for a draw and 0 points for losing.

== Results ==
Brentford's goal tally listed first.

=== Legend ===
| Win | Draw | Loss |

=== Southern League First Division ===
| No. | Date | Opponent | Venue | Result | Scorer(s) |
|---|---|---|---|---|---|
| 1 | 7 September 1901 | Swindon Town | A | 0–0 | |
| 2 | 14 September 1901 | West Ham United | A | 0–2 | |
| 3 | 21 September 1901 | Kettering | A | 1–3 | McLeod |
| 4 | 28 September 1901 | Luton Town | H | 0–1 | |
| 5 | 5 October 1901 | Millwall Athletic | A | 1–4 | McSwan |
| 6 | 12 October 1901 | Queens Park Rangers | H | 1–1 | Turnbull |
| 7 | 19 October 1901 | Reading | A | 0–2 | |
| 8 | 26 October 1901 | Southampton | A | 0–1 | |
| 9 | 9 November 1901 | New Brompton | H | 3–2 | McElhaney, Shanks, Logan |
| 10 | 30 November 1901 | Wellingborough | A | 1–3 | Crump |
| 11 | 7 December 1901 | Wellingborough | H | 3–0 | Shanks, Andrews, McEleny |
| 12 | 14 December 1901 | Southampton | H | 1–1 | Regan |
| 13 | 21 December 1901 | Swindon Town | H | 2–0 | Stormont, Andrews |
| 14 | 4 January 1902 | Kettering | H | 1–1 | Shanks |
| 15 | 11 January 1902 | Luton Town | A | 1–1 | Regan |
| 16 | 18 January 1902 | Millwall Athletic | H | 0–2 | |
| 17 | 25 January 1902 | Queens Park Rangers | A | 2–3 | Parkinson, Shanks |
| 18 | 1 February 1902 | Reading | H | 0–1 | |
| 19 | 15 February 1902 | Bristol Rovers | H | 2–0 | Shanks, Jury |
| 20 | 22 February 1902 | New Brompton | A | 0–2 | |
| 21 | 1 March 1902 | Northampton Town | H | 4–2 | Jury, Shanks, Grieve, Regan |
| 22 | 3 March 1902 | West Ham United | H | 0–2 | |
| 23 | 8 March 1902 | Watford | A | 1–2 | Regan (pen) |
| 24 | 15 March 1902 | Tottenham Hotspur | H | 2–1 | Logan, Shanks |
| 25 | 28 March 1902 | Bristol Rovers | A | 0–5 | |
| 26 | 29 March 1902 | Portsmouth | H | 1–4 | Andrews |
| 27 | 1 April 1902 | Northampton Town | A | 2–2 | Logan, Shanks |
| 28 | 12 April 1902 | Watford | H | 4–3 | Shanks, Logan, Andrews, Regan (pen) |
| 29 | 19 April 1902 | Portsmouth | A | 1–7 | Jury |
| 30 | 26 April 1902 | Tottenham Hotspur | A | 0–3 | |

=== Southern League Test Match ===
| Date | Opponent | Venue | Result | Scorer | Notes |
|---|---|---|---|---|---|
| 28 April 1902 | Grays United | N | 1–1 | Andrews | (Note: Match played at Memorial Grounds, Canning Town. With the score at 1–1, Grays United forfeited promotion by refusing to play extra time.) |

=== FA Cup ===
| Round | Date | Opponent | Venue | Result | Scorer(s) |
|---|---|---|---|---|---|
| 3QR | 2 November 1901 | Marlow | A | 3–0 | McLeod (pen), Broughton, McElhaney |
| 4QR | 23 November 1901 | Shepherd's Bush | H | 2–3 | Shanks, Turnbull |

- Source: 100 Years of Brentford

== Playing squad ==
Note: Flags indicate national team as defined under FIFA eligibility rules; some limited exceptions apply. Players may hold more than one non-FIFA nationality.

| Pos. | Nation | Player |
|---|---|---|
| GK | ENG | Billy Green |
| GK | ENG | Tommy Spicer |
| DF | SCO | Harry Gilmour |
| DF | ENG | Alfred Mattocks |
| DF | SCO | Ralph McElhaney |
| DF | SCO | David Robson |
| DF | SCO | A. Wylie |
| MF | ENG | Harry Crump |
| MF | ENG | William Hainsworth |
| MF | IRL | Charlie McEleny |
| MF | ENG | Bill Regan |
| MF | SCO | Robert Stormont (c) |
| FW | ENG | E. Andrews |

| Pos. | Nation | Player |
|---|---|---|
| FW | ENG | Frederick Broughton |
| FW | SCO | Tom Grieve |
| FW | ENG | Harry Harris |
| FW | ENG | Horace Jury |
| FW | SCO | Paddy Logan |
| FW | SCO | Roddy McLeod |
| FW | SCO | Ranald McSwan |
| FW | ENG | John Parkinson |
| FW | IRL | Tommy Shanks |
| FW | ENG | Henry Spawton |
| FW | ENG | Henry Squires |
| FW | ENG | Joe Turner |

=== Left club during season ===
Note: Flags indicate national team as defined under FIFA eligibility rules; some limited exceptions apply. Players may hold more than one non-FIFA nationality.

| Pos. | Nation | Player |
|---|---|---|
| MF | ENG | Thomas Briddon (to Ilkeston Town) |
| FW | ENG | Francis Dexter (to Pinxton) |

| Pos. | Nation | Player |
|---|---|---|
| FW | SCO | Peter Turnbull (to Barrow) |

- Source: 100 Years of Brentford, The Football Association

== Coaching staff ==
| Name | Role |
|---|---|
| (England) Tom King | Trainer |

== Statistics ==
=== Appearances ===

Brentford's highest appearance-makers in each position during the Southern League season.

=== Goalscorers ===
| Pos. | Nat | Player | SL1 | FAC | TM | Total |
|---|---|---|---|---|---|---|
| FW | (Ireland) | Tommy Shanks | 9 | 2 | 0 | 11 |
| HB | (England) | Bill Regan | 5 | 0 | 0 | 5 |
| FW | (England) | E. Andrews | 4 | 0 | 1 | 5 |
| FW | (Scotland) | Paddy Logan | 4 | 0 | 0 | 4 |
| FW | (England) | Horace Jury | 3 | 0 | 0 | 3 |
| FW | (Scotland) | Peter Turnbull | 1 | 2 | 0 | 3 |
| DF | (Scotland) | Ralph McElhaney | 1 | 1 | 0 | 2 |
| FW | (Scotland) | Roddy McLeod | 1 | 1 | 0 | 2 |
| HB | (England) | Harry Crump | 1 | 0 | 0 | 1 |
| FW | (Scotland) | Tom Grieve | 1 | 0 | 0 | 1 |
| HB | (Ireland) | Charlie McEleny | 1 | 0 | 0 | 1 |
| FW | (Scotland) | Ranald McSwan | 1 | 0 | 0 | 1 |
| FW | (England) | John Parkinson | 1 | 0 | 0 | 1 |
| HB | (Scotland) | Robert Stormont | 1 | 0 | 0 | 1 |
| Total | | | 34 | 6 | 1 | 41 |

- Players listed in italics left the club mid-season.
- Source: 100 Years Of Brentford

=== Management ===
| Name | From | To | Record All Comps | | | | | Record League | | | | |
| Name | From | To | P | W | D | L | W % | P | W | D | L | W % |
|---|---|---|---|---|---|---|---|---|---|---|---|---|
| Committee | 7 September 1901 | 28 April 1902 | 33 | 8 | 7 | 18 | 24.24 | 30 | 7 | 6 | 17 | 23.33 |

=== Summary ===
| Games played | 33 (30 Southern League First Division, 1 Southern League Test Match, 2 FA Cup) |
| Games won | 8 (7 Southern League First Division, 0 Southern League Test Match, 1 FA Cup) |
| Games drawn | 7 (6 Southern League First Division, 1 Southern League Test Match, 0 FA Cup) |
| Games lost | 18 (17 Southern League First Division, 0 Southern League Test Match, 1 FA Cup) |
| Goals scored | 40 (34 Southern League First Division, 1 Southern League Test Match, 5 FA Cup) |
| Goals conceded | 65 (61 Southern League First Division, 1 Southern League Test Match, 3 FA Cup) |
| Clean sheets | 5 (4 Southern League First Division, 0 Southern League Test Match, 1 FA Cup) |
| Biggest league win | 3–0 versus Wellingborough, 7 December 1901 |
| Worst league defeat | 7–1 versus Portsmouth, 19 April 1902 |
| Most appearances | 29, Charlie McEleny (26 Southern League First Division, 1 Southern League Test Match, 2 FA Cup) |
| Top scorer (league) | 9, Tommy Shanks |
| Top scorer (all competitions) | 10, Tommy Shanks |
