= Thomas Grieve =

Thomas Grieve may refer to:

- Thomas Grieve (painter) (1799–1882), English painter
- Tom Grieve (born 1948), American baseball player
- Tom Grieve (footballer) (1875–1948), football outside right
