= Harry Crump =

Harry Crump may refer to:

- Harry Crump (American football) (born 1940), American football fullback
- Harry Crump (footballer) (1873–1918), English footballer
