= Willie Green (disambiguation) =

Willie Green (born 1981) is an American basketball player and coach.

Willie Green may also refer to:

- Willie Green (American football) (born 1966), American football player
- Willie Green (baseball) (1894–1925), Negro leagues third baseman
- Willie Earl Green, sent to prison in 1983 for murder but released in 2008 after a change in testimony

== See also ==
- Willie Greene (born 1971), American baseball player
- Will Green (disambiguation)
- William Green (disambiguation)
