= William Green Jr. =

William Green Jr. may refer to:

- William Green Jr. (chaplain), Chief of Chaplains of the United States Army, 2023–2026
- William J. Green Jr. (1910–1963), Democratic member of the U.S. House of Representatives from Pennsylvania, 1949–1963
- William R. Green Jr. (1889–1966), judge of the United States Board of Tax Appeals (later the United States Tax Court), 1925–1929

== See also ==
- William Green (disambiguation)
