= William J. Green =

William J. Green may refer to:

- William J. Green, Jr. (1910–1963), U.S. Representative from Pennsylvania
- William J. Green, III (born 1938), mayor of Philadelphia
- Bill Green IV, also known as William J. Green, IV (born 1965), city council of Philadelphia

== See also ==
- William Green (disambiguation)
