= Bill Regan (footballer) =

English footballer

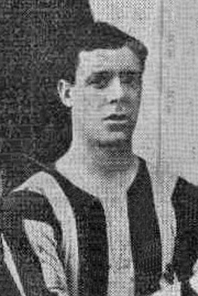
- Regan while at Brentford in 1902

Personal information
- Full name: William Regan
- Date of birth: 1873
- Place of birth: Leeds, England
- Date of death: 1934 (aged 61)
- Place of death: Burnley, England
- Position: Wing half

Senior career*
Years	Team	Apps	(Gls)
1894–1895	The Wednesday	0	(0)
1895–1896	Fairfield Athletic		
1896–1898	The Wednesday	9	(0)
1898–1900	Gravesend United		
1900–1901	Millwall Athletic		
1901–1903	Brentford	45	(7)
1903–1904	Eltham		
1904	Kensal Rise United		
1904–1907	Eltham		
- * Club domestic league appearances and goals

William Regan (1873–1934) was an English professional footballer who played in as a wing half in the Football League for The Wednesday.

== Career statistics ==
Appearances and goals by club, season and competition
Club	Season	League			FA Cup		Other		Total	
Club	Season	Division	Apps	Goals	Apps	Goals	Apps	Goals	Apps	Goals
The Wednesday	1896–97	First Division	7	0	0	0	0	0	7	0
The Wednesday	1897–98	First Division	2	0	0	0	0	0	2	0
The Wednesday	Total		9	0	0	0	0	0	9	0
Brentford	1901–02	Southern League First Division	30	5	3	0	1 (Note: Appearance in Southern League promotion-relegation test match)	0	34	5
Brentford	1902–03	Southern League First Division	15	2	3	1	1	0	19	3
Brentford	Total		45	7	6	1	2	0	53	8
Career total			54	7	6	1	2	0	62	8
