= Alf Gilson =

English footballer

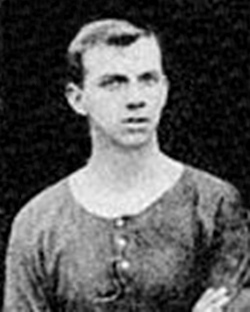
- Gilson while with Bristol City in 1904.

Personal information
- Full name: Thomas Anthony Gilson
- Date of birth: 1 July 1881
- Place of birth: Aylesbury, England
- Date of death: 2 March 1912 (aged 30)
- Place of death: Kingswood, England
- Position: Right back

Senior career*
Years	Team	Apps	(Gls)
- Whittington Royal
1899	Burton Swifts	0	(0)
1900–1901	Aston Villa	2	(0)
1902–1903	Brentford	21	(0)
1903–1905	Bristol City	47	(1)
1905–1906	Clapton Orient	2	(0)
1907	Brentford	3	(0)
1908–1910	Wycombe Wanderers		
- * Club domestic league appearances and goals

Thomas Anthony Gilson (1 July 1881 – 2 March 1912), sometimes known as Alf Gilson, was an English professional footballer who played as a right back in the Football League for Bristol City, Aston Villa and Clapton Orient.

== Personal life ==
After suffering from a chest condition which forced his retirement from football in September 1910, Gilson spent time recovering in Bournemouth, before returning home to Kingswood in February 1912. He then fell unconscious and died from pneumonia and pleurisy one month later.

== Career statistics ==
Appearances and goals by club, season and competition
Club	Season	League			FA Cup		Other		Total	
Club	Season	Division	Apps	Goals	Apps	Goals	Apps	Goals	Apps	Goals
Aston Villa	1900–01	First Division	2	0	0	0	—		2	0
Brentford	1902–03	Southern League First Division	21	0	3	0	1 (Note: Appearance in Southern League promotion-relegation test match)	0	25	0
Brentford	1906–07	Southern League First Division	3	0	—		—		3	0
Brentford	Total		24	0	3	0	1	0	28	0
Career total			26	0	3	0	1	0	30	0

== Honours ==
Bristol City

- Football League Second Division: 1905–06
- Gloucestershire Cup: 1903–04

Wycombe Wanderers

- Berks & Bucks Senior Cup: 1908–09, 1909–10
- Berks & Bucks Charity Cup: 1909–10
