= Will Green =

Will Green may refer to:

- Will Green (rugby union) (born 1973), English rugby union player
- Will Green (Australian footballer) (born 2005), Australian rules footballer
- Will Greene or A. Wilson Greene (born 1949), American historian
- Will S. Green (1832–1905), American pioneer

== See also ==
- William Green (disambiguation)
- Willie Green (disambiguation)
- Bill Green (disambiguation)
