= Tosher Underwood =

English footballer

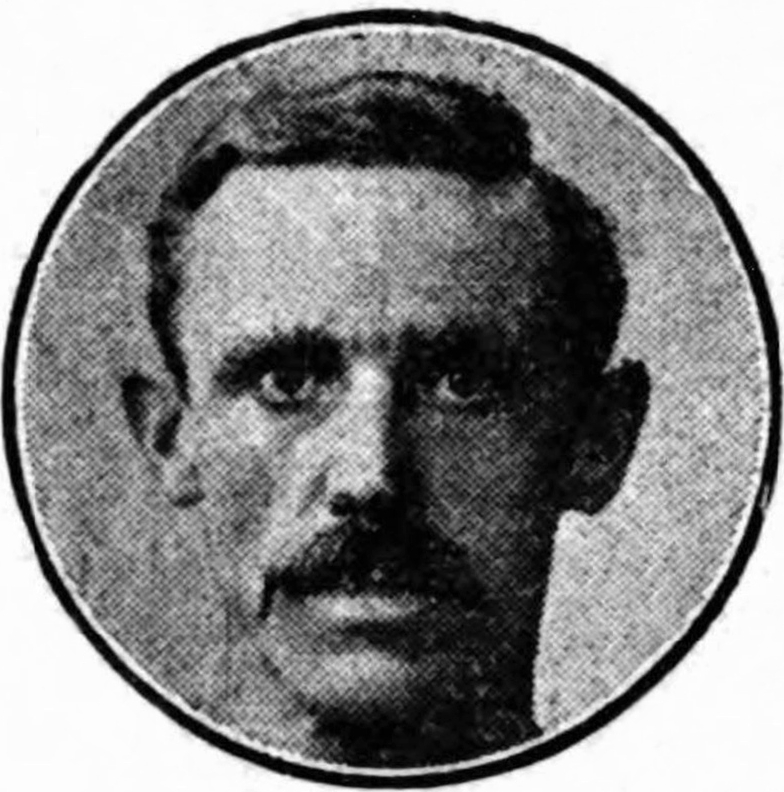
- Underwood while with Brentford in 1906.

Personal information
- Full name: Alexander Austin Underwood
- Date of birth: 6 February 1878
- Place of birth: Street, England
- Date of death: 28 November 1960 (aged 82)
- Place of death: Chiswick, England
- Position: Outside forward

Senior career*
Years	Team	Apps	(Gls)
1898–1899	Bristol St. George's		
1899–	Bristol Rovers	8	(1)
–1901	Fulham		
1901–	Grays United		
- → Fulham (loan)
1902–1908	Brentford	177	(20)
1908–1909	Glossop	18	(0)
1909–1910	Clapton Orient	37	(1)
- * Club domestic league appearances and goals

Alexander Austin Underwood (6 February 1878 – 28 November 1960) was an English professional footballer who played as an outside forward in the Football League for Glossop and Clapton Orient. He spent the majority of his career in the Southern League with Brentford, for whom he made over 170 appearances.

== Career ==
=== Early years ===
An outside forward, Underwood began his career with Bristol clubs Bristol St. George's and Bristol Rovers. He later moved to Southern League club Fulham, before signing for Grays United in July 1901 and then returning to Fulham on loan.

=== Brentford ===
Underwood's signed for Southern League First Division club Brentford on 4 June 1902. He made 195 appearances in all competitions for the Bees and was awarded a benefit match upon his departure at the end of the 1907–08 season. He was posthumously inducted into the Brentford Hall of Fame in 2015.

=== Glossop ===
Underwood moved up to the Football League and signed for Second Division club Glossop in May 1908. In February 1909, Underwood was part of the team which beat Sheffield Wednesday 1–0 in the third round of the FA Cup, which sent the Hillmen into the fourth round for the only time in the club's history. Glossop took eventual runners-up Bristol City to a replay in the fourth round and lost 1–0. He made 18 league appearances for Glossop.

=== Clapton Orient ===
Underwood's final known club was Second Division club Clapton Orient, whom he joined in June 1909. He made 37 league appearances and scored one goal for the club.

== Personal life ==
After retiring from football, Underwood returned to Brentford and became a shoemaker.

== Career statistics ==
Appearances and goals by club, season and competition
Club	Season	League			FA Cup		Other		Total	
Club	Season	Division	Apps	Goals	Apps	Goals	Apps	Goals	Apps	Goals
Brentford	1902–03	Southern League First Division	21	3	0	0	1 (Note: Appearance in Southern League promotion-relegation test match)	0	22	3
Brentford	1903–04	Southern League First Division	29	4	5	2	—		34	6
Brentford	1904–05	Southern League First Division	22	0	2	0	—		24	0
Brentford	1905–06	Southern League First Division	34	4	4	1	—		38	5
Brentford	1906–07	Southern League First Division	34	4	4	0	—		38	4
Brentford	1907–08	Southern League First Division	37	5	2	0	—		39	5
Career total			177	20	17	3	1	0	195	23

== Honours ==
- Brentford Hall of Fame
