= Tommy Spicer (footballer) =

English footballer

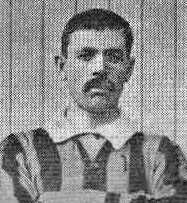
- Spicer while with Brentford in 1902

Personal information
- Full name: Thomas Ashby Spicer
- Date of birth: June 1876
- Place of birth: Brighton, England
- Date of death: January 1958 (aged 81)
- Place of death: Ealing, England
- Position: Goalkeeper

Senior career*
| Years | Team | Apps | (Gls) |
- Silver Star
- Sheppey United
| 1898–1900 | Brighton United | | |
| 1900–1901 | Woolwich Arsenal | 4 | (0) |
| 1901–1904 | Brentford | 51 | (0) |
| 1904–1905 | Leyton | | |
| 1905–1906 | Brentford | 4 | (0) |
- * Club domestic league appearances and goals

Thomas Ashby Spicer (June 1876 – January 1958) was an English professional footballer who appeared in the Football League for Woolwich Arsenal as a goalkeeper.

== Career statistics ==
Appearances and goals by club, season and competition
| Club | Season | League | | | FA Cup | | Other | | Total | |
| Club | Season | Division | Apps | Goals | Apps | Goals | Apps | Goals | Apps | Goals |
|---|---|---|---|---|---|---|---|---|---|---|
| Woolwich Arsenal | 1899–1900 | Second Division | 2 | 0 | 0 | 0 | — | | 2 | 0 |
| Woolwich Arsenal | 1900–01 | Second Division | 2 | 0 | 0 | 0 | — | | 2 | 0 |
| Woolwich Arsenal | Total | | 4 | 0 | 0 | 0 | — | | 4 | 0 |
| Brentford | 1901–02 | Southern League First Division | 21 | 0 | 3 | 0 | — | | 24 | 0 |
| Brentford | 1902–03 | Southern League First Division | 15 | 0 | 0 | 0 | 1 (Note: Appearance in Southern League promotion-relegation test match) | 0 | 16 | 0 |
| Brentford | 1903–04 | Southern League First Division | 15 | 0 | 0 | 0 | — | | 15 | 0 |
| Brentford | Total | | 51 | 0 | 3 | 0 | 1 | 0 | 55 | 0 |
| Brentford | 1905–06 | Southern League First Division | 4 | 0 | 0 | 0 | — | | 4 | 0 |
| Brentford | Total | | 55 | 0 | 3 | 0 | 1 | 0 | 59 | 0 |
| Career total | | | 59 | 0 | 3 | 0 | 1 | 0 | 63 | 0 |
