= Ralph McElhaney =

Scottish footballer

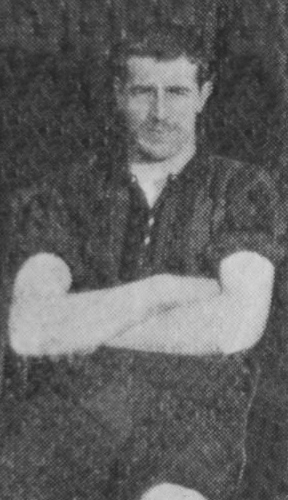
- McElhaney while with Tottenham Hotspur in 1897.

Personal information
- Full name: Ralph McElhaney
- Date of birth: 17 March 1874
- Place of birth: Govan, Scotland
- Date of death: 5 December 1930 (aged 56)
- Place of death: Romford, England
- Positions: Forward; right half

Senior career*
| Years | Team | Apps | (Gls) |
- Dreghorn Juniors
| –1894 | Fairfield Athletic | | |
| 1894–1895 | Third Lanark | | |
| 1895 | Celtic | 2 | (0) |
| 1895 | Clyde | 5 | (0) |
| 1895–1896 | Partick Thistle | 1 | (0) |
| 1896–1897 | Tottenham Hotspur | 19 | (6) |
| 1897–1898 | Swindon Town | 3 | (0) |
| 1898–1899 | Beith | | |
| 1899 | East Stirlingshire | | |
| 1899–1900 | Dunipace | | |
| 1900–1902 | Brentford | 45 | (12) |
| 1903–1904 | Grays United | | |
| 1904–1906 | Southall | | |
| 1906 | Grays United | | |
- * Club domestic league appearances and goals

Ralph McElhaney (17 March 1874 – 5 December 1930) was a Scottish professional footballer who played as a forward and half back in the Scottish League and the Southern League.

== Career statistics ==
Appearances and goals by club, season and competition
| Club | Season | League | | | National cup (Note: Includes Scottish Cup, FA Cup) | | Other | | Total | |
| Club | Season | Division | Apps | Goals | Apps | Goals | Apps | Goals | Apps | Goals |
|---|---|---|---|---|---|---|---|---|---|---|
| Celtic | 1894–95 | Scottish League First Division | 2 | 0 | — | | — | | 2 | 0 |
| Clyde | 1895–96 | Scottish League First Division | 5 | 0 | 0 | 0 | — | | 5 | 0 |
| Partick Thistle | 1895–96 | Scottish League Second Division | 1 | 0 | 0 | 0 | 0 | 0 | 1 | 1 |
| Tottenham Hotspur | 1896–97 | Southern League First Division | 19 | 6 | 3 | 1 | — | | 22 | 7 |
| Swindon Town | 1897–98 | Southern League First Division | 3 | 0 | 0 | 0 | — | | 3 | 0 |
| Brentford | 1899–1900 | Southern League Second Division | 10 | 0 | — | | — | | 10 | 0 |
| Brentford | 1900–01 | Southern League Second Division | 17 | 11 | 2 | 0 | 1 (Note: Appearance in Southern League promotion-relegation test match) | 0 | 20 | 11 |
| Brentford | 1901–02 | Southern League First Division | 18 | 1 | 3 | 1 | 1 | 0 | 22 | 2 |
| Brentford | Total | | 45 | 12 | 5 | 1 | 2 | 0 | 52 | 13 |
| Career total | | | 75 | 18 | 8 | 2 | 2 | 0 | 85 | 20 |

== Honours ==
Brentford

- Southern League Second Division: 1900–01
