= Jack Graham (footballer, born 1873) =

English footballer

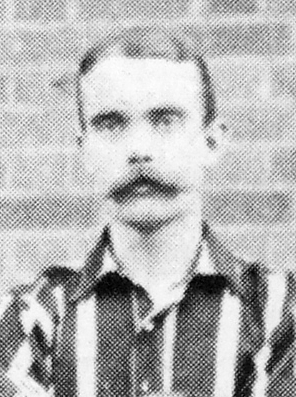
- Graham with Brentford in 1901.

Personal information
- Full name: John Graham
- Date of birth: 12 April 1873
- Place of birth: Derby, England
- Date of death: April 1925 (aged 51–52)
- Place of death: Lewisham, England
- Position: Right back

Senior career*
Years	Team	Apps	(Gls)
1890–1892	Magpie		
1892–1893	Cray Wanderers		
1893–1897	Millwall Athletic		
1897	Woolwich Arsenal	0	(0)
1897–1899	Millwall Athletic		
1899–1900	Woolwich Arsenal	1	(0)
1900–1901	Brentford	10	(0)
1901–1902	Fulham		
- * Club domestic league appearances and goals

John Graham (12 April 1873 – April 1925) was an English footballer.

== Career ==
Born in Derby, England, Jack Graham started off his football career playing for Cray Wanderers and Millwall Athletic of the Southern League. He later switched to playing for Woolwich Arsenal in September 1899, where he took up the defender position and was used as cover for Duncan McNichol, a Scottish footballer from Dumbartonshire. Graham made only one league appearance while he played for Arsenal, during a match against Gainsborough Trinity on 14 October 1899.

After leaving Arsenal, Graham transferred to Brentford for the 1900 close season, where he won the Southern League Second Division championship. He then transferred to Fulham in 1901, where he won another two Southern League Second Division championships. Graham also made 54 appearances in total for the Cottagers.

== Honours ==
Brentford

- Southern League Second Division (1): 1900–01

Fulham

- Southern League Second Division (2): 1901–02, 1902–03
