= Annabel Matthews =

American tax judge (1883–1960)

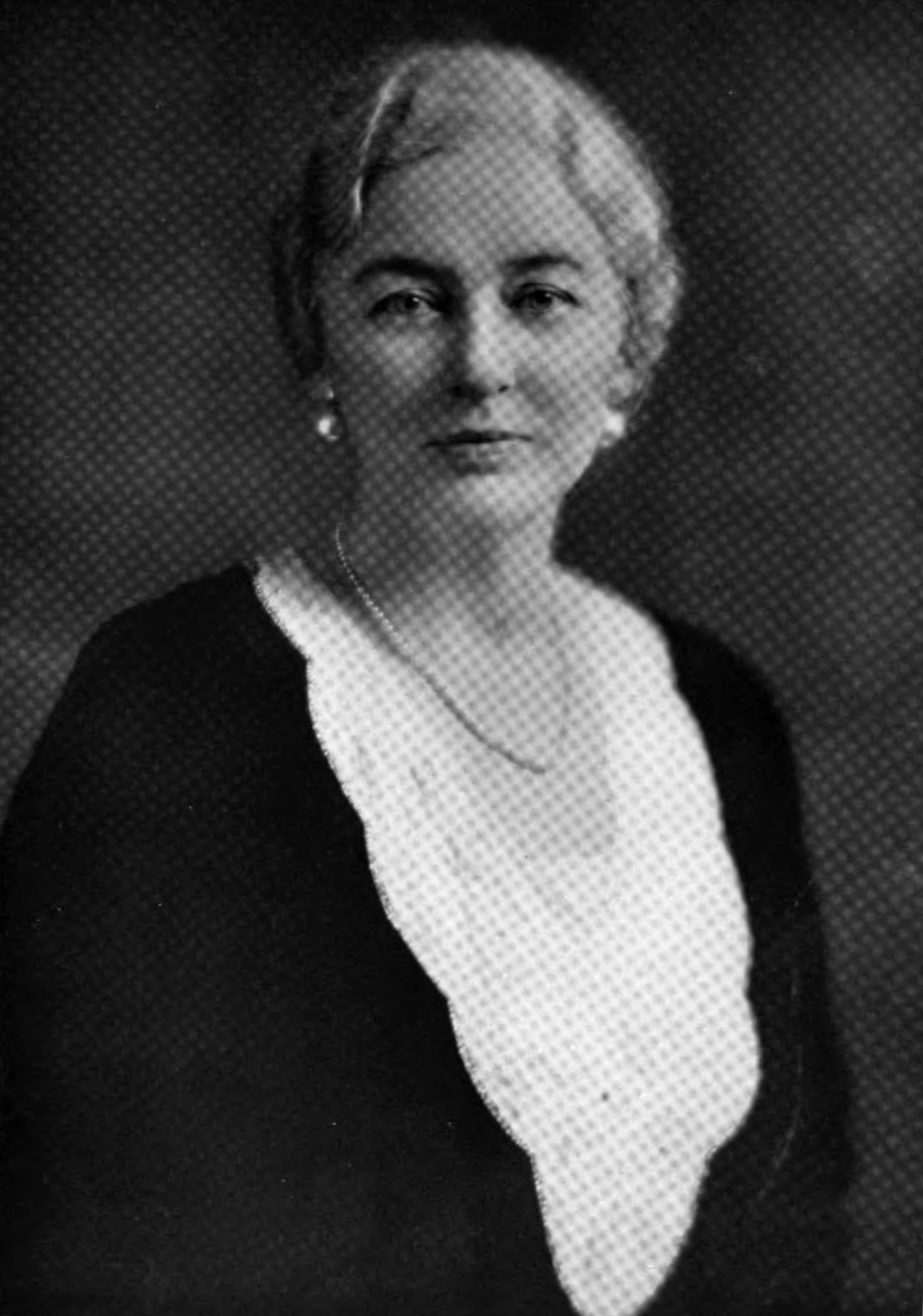
- Born: December 31, 1883; Culloden, Georgia
- Died: March 24, 1960 (aged 76); Washington, D.C.
- Occupation: Jurist

Annabel Matthews (December 31, 1883 – March 24, 1960) was the first woman to serve as a judge of the United States Board of Tax Appeals, having been appointed to that office by President Herbert Hoover and confirmed by the Senate in February 1930.

== Early life, and education, and career ==
Born in Culloden, Georgia, Matthews received an A.B. from Brenau College in Gainesville, Georgia in 1901, and was a schoolteacher from 1901 to 1914. She began working in the income tax division of the Internal Revenue Service in 1914. She attended Washington College of Law in the evenings, and was admitted to the Bar in 1921. On December 28, 1921, she spoke, along with other prominent female attorneys, at a meeting of the Professional Women's Section of the Women's City Club of the District of Columbia. In 1925, she was appointed as an attorney in the office of the Solicitor of Internal Revenue, the first woman to hold such a post.

She was then employed in the United States Department of the Treasury as a member of staff of the Interpretative Division of the General Counsel to the Commissioner. In 1927, she was appointed as a specialist on the foreign tax credit to the Committee of Technical Experts for the Council of the League of Nations, which had been expanded in that year to facilitate attendance by Americans, attending the meeting of that committee from April 5–12, 1927, in the offices of the Board of Inland Revenue in Somerset House on the Strand in London. The following year, she attended the 1928 World Conference on Preventing Double Taxation, in Geneva, Switzerland.

== Board of Tax Appeals service ==
Matthews was appointed to fill the unexpired term of William R. Green Jr. Matthews' appointment to the United States Board of Tax Appeals in 1930 was the first of several appointments which went against a previously observed Senate Resolution prohibiting the appointment to that body of persons recently employed by the Treasury Department. A dinner thrown in honor of her appointment included a speech by former Wyoming Governor Nellie Tayloe Ross imploring women to seek election to public office. She served until 1936, having not been reappointed to her seat on the Board by President Franklin D. Roosevelt, and then returned to the Bureau of Internal Revenue. In 1939, Matthews was one of several prominent women judges who wrote letters in an unsuccessful effort to promote the nomination of Florence E. Allen to the United States Supreme Court. In 1944, she left the government to work in private practice.

== Later life ==
In 1948, President Harry S. Truman appointed Matthews to a seat on the Fair Employment Board of the United States Civil Service Commission, over the opposition of the American Council on Human Rights, the National Council of Negro Women, and the Congress of Industrial Organizations due to Matthews participating in preventing blacks from becoming members of the Washington chapter of the American Association of University Women. Matthews served until 1954, and then retired, remaining in Washington, D.C. until her death.
