= Fred Nidd =

English footballer

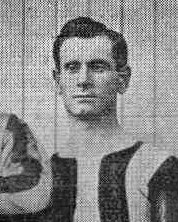
- Nidd with Brentford in 1902.

Personal information
- Full name: George Frederick Nidd
- Date of birth: 9 January 1870
- Place of birth: Kirton, England
- Date of death: September 1956 (aged 86)
- Place of death: Watford, England
- Positions: Full back; goalkeeper

Senior career*
Years	Team	Apps	(Gls)
1889–1892	Everton	0	(0)
1892–1893	Southport Central	0	(0)
1893–1894	Everton	0	(0)
1894–1895	Preston North End	3	(0)
1895–1896	Southport Central	1	(0)
1895–1896	Bury		
1896–1897	Stalybridge Rovers		
1897	Halliwell Rovers		
1897–1898	Lincoln City	9	(0)
1898–1900	Grimsby Town	40	(1)
1900–1902	Watford	55	(0)
1902–1903	Brentford	25	(0)
1903–1904	Fulham		
1904–1905	Grays United		
1905	Clapton Orient		
1905–1907	Grays United		
1907	Watford	0	(0)
1916	Watford	1	(0)
- * Club domestic league appearances and goals

George Frederick Nidd (9 January 1870 – September 1956) was an English professional footballer, who played for a large number of clubs in the Football League and Southern League in the late 19th and early 20th centuries. His primary position was full back, but he had spells in goal for Grimsby Town and Watford.

== Personal life ==
Nidd was born in Kirton and as of 1891 he was working as a clerk in Walton. In 1911, his occupation was listed as a manufacturer in St Pancras. After retiring from football, Nidd returned to live in Watford and he served the final months of the First World War in the Royal Air Force.

== Career statistics ==
Appearances and goals by club, season and competition
Club	Season	League			FA Cup		Total	
Club	Season	Division	Apps	Goals	Apps	Goals	Apps	Goals
Preston North End	1893–94	First Division	3	0	0	0	3	0
Southport Central	1895–96	Lancashire League	1	0	0	0	1	0
Lincoln City	1897–98	Second Division	9	0	2	0	11	0
Watford	1900–01	Southern League First Division	27	0	3	0	30	0
Watford	1901–02	Southern League First Division	28	0	2	0	30	0
Watford	Total		55	0	5	0	60	0
Brentford	1902–03	Southern League First Division	25	0	8	0	33	0
Fulham	1903–04	Southern League First Division	0	0	3	0	3	0
Career total			84	0	16	0	100	0
