= John Bayne (footballer) =

Scottish footballer

Personal information
- Full name: John Bayne
- Date of birth: 23 November 1877
- Place of birth: Ramoyle, Scotland
- Date of death: 21 July 1915 (aged 37)
- Place of death: Richebourg-Saint-Vaast, France
- Position: Centre forward

Senior career*
Years	Team	Apps	(Gls)
1898	Reading	1	(0)
1899	Brentford	2	(2)
1902–1903	Heart of Midlothian	0	(0)
1903	Raith Rovers	1	(0)
1903	Brentford	2	(0)
- * Club domestic league appearances and goals

John Bayne (23 November 1877 – 21 July 1915) was a Scottish footballer who played in the Southern League for Reading and Brentford as a centre forward. He also played in the Scottish League for Raith Rovers.

== Personal life ==
Bayne was married with three children. He enlisted in the British Army on 17 February 1896 and served as a private in the Black Watch during the Second Boer War. Between the end of his service and the outbreak of the First World War, Bayne worked in a mill in Dunblane. He was recalled to the Black Watch after the outbreak of the First World War in 1914 and was killed by a rifle grenade at Richebourg-Saint-Vaast on the Western Front on 21 July 1915. Bayne was buried in St Vaast Post Military Cemetery, Richebourg-l'Avoué.

== Career statistics ==
Appearances and goals by club, season and competition
Club	Season	League			National Cup		Total	
Club	Season	Division	Apps	Goals	Apps	Goals	Apps	Goals
Brentford	1899–1900	Southern League Second Division	2	2	—		2	2
Raith Rovers	1902–03	Scottish League First Division	1	0	—		1	0
Brentford	1902–03	Southern League First Division	2	0	—		2	0
Brentford	Total		4	2	0	0	4	2
Career total			5	2	0	0	5	2
