= Bill Gooing =

English footballer

Personal information
- Full name: William Henry Gooing
- Date of birth: 1874
- Place of birth: Penistone, Barnsley, Yorkshire, England
- Date of death: 1969 (aged 94–95)
- Position: Centre forward

Youth career
- Penistone Wath

Senior career*
Years	Team	Apps	(Gls)
1895–1897	Sheffield Wednesday	3	(1)
1897–1901	Chesterfield	63	(25)
1901–1905	Woolwich Arsenal	94	(45)
1905	Northampton Town		
- * Club domestic league appearances and goals

William Henry Gooing (1874–1969) was an English footballer.

Born in Penistone, near Barnsley, Yorkshire, Gooing started his career at junior side Penistone Wath before joining Sheffield Wednesday in 1895. A centre forward, he spent two seasons with Wednesday, but only played three First Division games with them during this time, scoring one goal in a 1–1 draw against Birmingham City. In 1897 he moved on to Chesterfield, making his debut against Burton Wanderers on 4 September 1897. During his time with the Spireites they were elected to the Football League's Second Division in 1899, and Gooing became a regular goalscorer, notching 25 goals in 63 league appearances.

In November 1901 Gooing moved to Woolwich Arsenal, making his debut on 16 November 1901 against Newton Heath, a match which Arsenal won 2–0. A regular over the next three seasons, Gooing spearheaded an Arsenal attack (along with Tim Coleman and Tommy Shanks) that won the side promotion from the Second to the First Division in 1903-04, the three of them scoring 66 goals between them in that season.

However, after Arsenal's promotion Gooing was replaced by Charlie Satterthwaite and spent much of the 1904-05 as Satterthwaite's understudy, although he did feature in Arsenal's very first First Division match, against Newcastle United on 3 September 1904. In early 1905 he left Arsenal for Northampton Town, but later retired the same year. In total, he played 106 times for Arsenal, scoring 48 goals.

He died aged 95, in 1969.
