= William Halley =

Scottish footballer

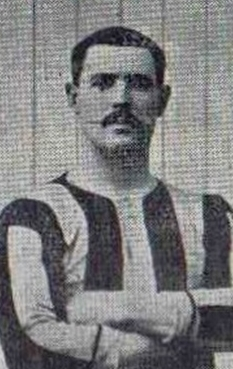
- Halley while with Brentford in 1902

Personal information
- Full name: William Halley
- Date of birth: 28 October 1874
- Place of birth: Clackmannan, Scotland
- Position: Right back

Senior career*
Years	Team	Apps	(Gls)
1893–1897	Clackmannan		
1897–1898	Bolton Wanderers	1	(0)
1898–1899	Bedminster		
1899	Bristol St George		
1899–1900	Bolton Wanderers	39	(0)
1900–1902	Millwall Athletic		
1902–1903	Brentford	12	(0)
Total		52	(0)
- * Club domestic league appearances and goals

William Halley was a Scottish professional footballer who played as a right back in the Football League for Bolton Wanderers.

== Career statistics ==
Appearances and goals by club, season and competition
Club	Season	League			FA Cup		Total	
Club	Season	Division	Apps	Goals	Apps	Goals	Apps	Goals
Bolton Wanderers	1897–98	First Division	1	0	0	0	1	0
Bolton Wanderers	1900–01	First Division	39	0	1	0	40	0
Bolton Wanderers	Total		40	0	1	0	41	0
Brentford	1902–03	Southern League First Division	12	0	3	0	15	0
Career total			52	0	4	0	56	0
