= Percy Turner =

English footballer

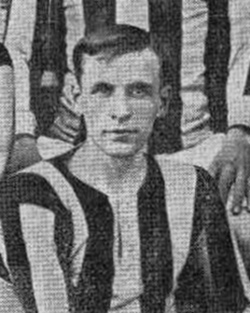
- Turner at Brentford in 1902

Personal information
- Full name: Percy George Turner
- Date of birth: 8 August 1879
- Place of birth: Mountsorrel, England
- Date of death: 9 October 1954 (aged 75)
- Place of death: Willesden, England
- Position: Inside forward

Senior career*
Years	Team	Apps	(Gls)
- Mountsorrel St. Peters
1897–1898	Loughborough	7	(0)
1899–1900	Swindon Town	7	(3)
1900	Barnsley	5	(1)
1900–1901	Chesterfield Town	14	(4)
1901–1902	Wellingborough		
1902–1903	Brentford	32	(2)
1904	Grimsby Town	14	(0)
1907	Grimsby Rangers		
- * Club domestic league appearances and goals

Percy George Turner (8 August 1879 – 9 October 1954) was an English professional footballer who played in the Football League for Chesterfield, Grimsby Town, Loughborough and Barnsley as an inside forward.

== Career statistics ==
Appearances and goals by club, season and competition
Club	Season	League			FA Cup		Other		Total	
Club	Season	Division	Apps	Goals	Apps	Goals	Apps	Goals	Apps	Goals
Swindon Town	1899–1900	Southern League First Division	7	3	0	0	—		7	3
Chesterfield Town	1900–01	Second Division	14	4	5	4	—		19	8
Brentford	1902–03	Southern League First Division	26	1	6	1	1 (Note: Appearance in Southern League promotion-relegation test match)	2	33	4
Brentford	1903–04	Southern League First Division	6	1	—		—		6	1
Brentford	Total		32	2	6	1	1	2	39	5
Career total			53	9	11	5	1	2	65	16
