= Ellis Green =

English footballer

Personal information
- Full name: Ellis Green
- Date of birth: 12 April 1880
- Place of birth: Adlington, England
- Date of death: 18 September 1936 (aged 56)
- Place of death: Chorley, England
- Positions: Outside left; centre half

Senior career*
Years	Team	Apps	(Gls)
- Chorley
1900–1901	Preston North End	27000	(8)
- Chorley
1902–1903	Brentford	19	(0)
- Colne
- Pendlebury
- * Club domestic league appearances and goals

Ellis Green (12 April 1880 – 18 September 1936) was an English professional football outside left, who played in the Football League for Preston North End. He also captained Southern League club Brentford.

== Career statistics ==
Club	Season	League			FA Cup		Total	
Club	Season	Division	Apps	Goals	Apps	Goals	Apps	Goals
Preston North End	1900–01	First Division	27	8	0	0	27	8
Brentford	1902–03	Southern League First Division	19	0	0	0	19	0
Career total			46	8	0	0	46	8
