= Thomas Shufflebotham =

English footballer

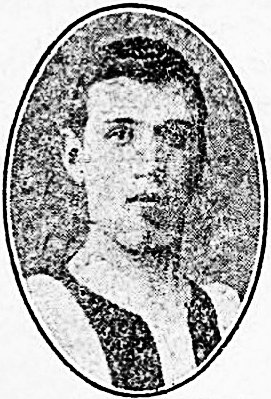
- Shufflebottom while with Rotherham Town in 1906

Personal information
- Full name: Thomas Shufflebotham
- Date of birth: 13 November 1880
- Place of birth: Macclesfield, England
- Date of death: September 1959 (aged 78)
- Place of death: Birmingham, England
- Position(s): Centre half

Senior career*
Years	Team	Apps	(Gls)
1901	Stoke	0	(0)
1902–1903	Brentford	11	(0)
1903–1904	Chesterfield Town	33	(0)
1904–1905	Queens Park Rangers	1	(0)
1906–1907	Rotherham Town		
1907	Workington		
1907	Lincoln City		
1908–1909	Ilkeston Town		
1909	Walsall		
- *Club domestic league appearances and goals

Thomas Shufflebotham (13 November 1880 – September 1959) was an English professional footballer who played as a centre half in the Football League for Chesterfield Town. He also played for a number of other clubs.

== Career statistics ==
Appearances and goals by club, season and competition
Club	Season	League			FA Cup		Total	
Club	Season	Division	Apps	Goals	Apps	Goals	Apps	Goals
Stoke	1901–02	First Division	0	0	0	0	0	0
Brentford	1902–03	Southern League First Division	11	0	5	0	16	0
Chesterfield Town	1903–04	Second Division	33	0	3	0	36	0
Queens Park Rangers	1904–05	Southern League First Division	1	0	0	0	1	0
Career total			45	0	8	0	53	0
