= Paddy Logan (footballer) =

Scottish footballer

Personal information
- Full name: Peter Logan
- Date of birth: 24 July 1877
- Place of birth: Glasgow, Scotland
- Date of death: 9 December 1957 (aged 80)
- Place of death: Uddingston, Scotland
- Position: Inside forward

Senior career*
Years	Team	Apps	(Gls)
1896–1898	Motherwell	14	(14)
1898–1899	Notts County	16	(6)
1899–1900	Woolwich Arsenal	23	(6)
1900–1901	Reading		
1901	Woolwich Arsenal	5	(1)
1901–1902	Brentford	21	(4)
- * Club domestic league appearances and goals

Peter Logan (24 July 1877 – 9 December 1957) was a Scottish footballer.

Born in Glasgow, Logan started his career with Motherwell before moving to Notts County in 1898. He spent a single season there before moving to Woolwich Arsenal in May 1899. He was an immediate first-team regular at inside right, displacing Jack Aston and playing 23 league games; his debut came in a First Division game against Leicester Fosse on 2 September 1899.

Logan left Arsenal in the summer of 1900 to join Reading of the Southern League but returned to Woolwich Arsenal a year later. His second spell at Arsenal was shorter and less successful; he only played five league games before losing his place to Bill Gooing. He left Arsenal for Brentford in November 1901; in total he made 29 appearances for Arsenal, scoring 7 goals.
