= Bill Green (footballer, born 1914) =

Australian rules footballer, born 1914

Personal information
- Full name: Bill Green
- Born: 12 October 1914
- Died: 2 December 1981 (aged 67)
- Original team: Yallourn
- Height: 183 cm (6 ft 0 in)
- Weight: 76 kg (168 lb)

Playing career^{1}
Years	Club	Games (Goals)
1939–40	Essendon	6 (6)
- ^{1} Playing statistics correct to the end of 1940.

Bill Green (12 October 1914 – 2 December 1981) was an Australian rules footballer who played with Essendon in the Victorian Football League (VFL).
