= Harry Crump (footballer) =

English footballer

Personal information
- Full name: William Harold Crump
- Date of birth: 10 February 1873
- Place of birth: Smethwick, England
- Date of death: 31 January 1918 (aged 44)
- Place of death: Burton upon Trent, England
- Height: 5 ft 8 in (1.73 m)
- Position(s): Left half

Senior career*
Years	Team	Apps	(Gls)
- Smethwick Centaur
- West Smethwick
- Wednesfield
1894–1895	Wolverhampton Wanderers	1	(0)
1895–	Hereford Thistle		
–1896	Bloxwich		
1896–1898	Tottenham Hotspur	30	(2)
1898–1899	Luton Town	25	(0)
1899–1900	Tottenham Hotspur	0	(0)
1900–1901	Thames Ironworks		
1900–1901	Doncaster Rovers		(0)
1901–1902	Brentford	6	(1)
	Watford	0	(0)
- *Club domestic league appearances and goals

William Harold Crump (10 February 1873 – 31 January 1918) was an English professional footballer who played as a left half in the Football League for Luton Town and Wolverhampton Wanderers. He also played in the Southern League for Tottenham Hotspur.

== Career statistics ==
Appearances and goals by club, season and competition
Club	Season	League			National cup (Note: Includes FA Cup)		Other		Total	
Club	Season	Division	Apps	Goals	Apps	Goals	Apps	Goals	Apps	Goals
Wolverhampton Wanderers	1893–94	First Division	0	0	0	0	1 (Note: Appearance in Birmingham Charity Cup)	0	1	0
Wolverhampton Wanderers	1894–95	First Division	1	0	0	0	1 (Note: Appearance in Birmingham Senior Cup)	0	2	0
Wolverhampton Wanderers	Total		1	0	0	0	2	0	3	0
Luton Town	1898–99	Second Division	25	0	5	1	―		30	1
Tottenham Hotspur	1896–97	Southern League First Division	19	2	2	2	―		21	4
Tottenham Hotspur	1897–98	Southern League First Division	11	0	2	1	―		13	1
Tottenham Hotspur	Total		30	2	4	3	―		34	5
Brentford	1901–02	Southern League First Division	6	1	0	0	―		6	1
Career total			62	3	9	4	2	0	73	7
