= Davie Maher =

English footballer

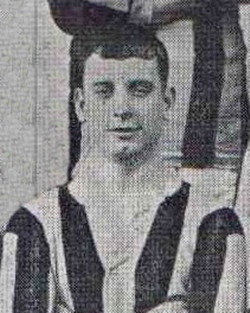
- Maher while at Brentford 1902

Personal information
- Full name: David Maher
- Date of birth: 30 November 1880
- Place of birth: Poplar, England
- Date of death: 21 February 1936 (aged 55)
- Place of death: Carlisle, England
- Positions: Outside right; inside right

Senior career*
| Years | Team | Apps | (Gls) |
| 1899–1902 | Millwall Athletic | | |
| 1902–1903 | Brentford | 29 | (3) |
| 1903–1906 | Preston North End | 24 | (2) |
| 1906–1915 | Carlisle United | | |
- * Club domestic league appearances and goals

David Maher (30 November 1880 – 21 February 1936) was an English professional footballer who played as a forward in the Football League for Preston North End.

== Career statistics ==
Appearances and goals by club, season and competition
| Club | Season | League | | | FA Cup | | Other | | Total | |
| Club | Season | Division | Apps | Goals | Apps | Goals | Apps | Goals | Apps | Goals |
|---|---|---|---|---|---|---|---|---|---|---|
| Brentford | 1902–03 | Southern League First Division | 29 | 3 | 6 | 3 | 1 (Note: Appearance in Southern League promotion-relegation test match) | 0 | 36 | 6 |
| Preston North End | 1904–05 | First Division | 5 | 0 | 0 | 0 | ― | | 5 | 0 |
| Preston North End | 1905–06 | First Division | 5 | 0 | 0 | 0 | ― | | 5 | 0 |
| Preston North End | Total | | 10 | 0 | 0 | 0 | ― | | 10 | 0 |
| Career total | | | 39 | 3 | 6 | 3 | 1 | 0 | 46 | 6 |

== Honours ==
Preston North End

- Football League Second Division: 1903–04
