= Harry Dutfield =

English footballer

Personal information
- Date of birth: December 1879
- Place of birth: Birmingham, England
- Date of death: 6 June 1918 (aged 38)
- Place of death: Poperinge, Belgium
- Position: Full back

Senior career*
Years	Team	Apps	(Gls)
1899–1902	Beddington Corner		
1902	Brentford	1	(0)
- * Club domestic league appearances and goals

Harry Dutfield (December 1879 – 6 June 1918) was an English professional footballer who played as a full back in the Southern Football League for Brentford.

== Personal life ==
Dutfield worked as a leather dresser and married Louisa Brown in 1899. In May 1917, two-and-a-half-years after the outbreak of the First World War, he enlisted in the 4th (Reserve) Battalion of the Leicestershire Regiment (later the Royal Leicestershire Regiment) in Leicester, being posted to France in October. Private Dutfield was killed in action at Poperinge on 6 June 1918 while serving with his regiment's 1st Battalion and was buried in Nine Elms British Cemetery, west of Poperinge. His eldest son, Private George Henry Dutfield of the King's Own Royal Regiment (Lancaster), was killed in April 1918.

== Career statistics ==
Appearances and goals by club, season and competition
Club	Season	League			FA Cup		Total	
Club	Season	Division	Apps	Goals	Apps	Goals	Apps	Goals
Brentford	1902–03	Southern League First Division	1	0	0	0	1	0
Career total			1	0	0	0	1	0
