= Bill Green (footballer, born 1932) =

Australian rules footballer

Personal information
- Full name: Bill Green
- Born: 26 January 1932
- Original team: Heyfield
- Height: 183 cm (6 ft 0 in)
- Weight: 80 kg (176 lb)

Playing career^{1}
Years	Club	Games (Goals)
1953–54	Richmond	10 (0)
- ^{1} Playing statistics correct to the end of 1954.

Bill Green (born 26 January 1932) is a former Australian rules footballer who played with Richmond in the Victorian Football League (VFL).
