= Joe Connor (footballer, born 1877) =

Irish footballer (1877–1934)

Personal information
- Full name: Maurice Joseph John Connor
- Date of birth: 26 September 1877
- Place of birth: Philipstown, Ireland
- Date of death: 1934 (aged 56–57)
- Position: Inside right

Senior career*
Years	Team	Apps	(Gls)
- Dundee Fereday
- Gordon Highlanders
1898–1899	West Bromwich Albion	10	(0)
1899–1901	Walsall	48	(14)
1901–1902	Bristol City	25	(8)
1902	Woolwich Arsenal	14	(2)
1903	Brentford	11	(2)
1903–1904	New Brompton	4	(0)
1904–1905	Fulham	11	(1)
1905	Colne		
1905	Blackpool	0	(0)
1906–1907	Treharris Athletic		
Total		124	(28)

International career
1903–1904	Ireland	3	(1)
- * Club domestic league appearances and goals

Maurice Joseph John Connor (26 September 1877 – 1934) was an Irish footballer who played as an inside right at both club and international levels.

== Early life ==
Maurice Joseph John Connor was born on 26 September 1877 in Philipstown, Ireland.

== Career ==
=== Club career ===
Connor played professionally in The Football League for West Bromwich Albion, Walsall, Bristol City, Woolwich Arsenal and Blackpool. Connor also played in the Southern League for Brentford, New Brompton, Fulham and in the Lancashire Combination for Colne. Connor also played in Scotland for Dundee Fereday and Gordon Highlanders and in Wales for Treharris Athletic.

=== International career ===
Connor played at international level for Ireland, and participated at the 1903 British Home Championship.
