= Billy Green (footballer, born 1927) =

English footballer

Personal information
- Full name: William Green
- Date of birth: 9 October 1927
- Place of birth: Hull, England
- Date of death: 1996 (aged 68–69)
- Place of death: Northampton, England
- Position: Defender

Youth career
- Wolverhampton Wanderers

Senior career*
Years	Team	Apps	(Gls)
1945–1949	Wolverhampton Wanderers	0	(0)
1949–1954	Walsall	180	(8)
1954–1957	Wrexham	60	(2)
- Wellington Town
- Caernarfon Town
- Pwllheli
- * Club domestic league appearances and goals as of 23:17, 19 March 2018 (UTC)

William Green (9 October 1927 – 1996) was an English footballer, who played as a defender.

== Career ==
Green came up through the Wolverhampton Wanderers youth team, however did not make a senior appearance with the club. He would move to Walsall in 1949.

At Walsall, however, he would secure a first team spot, being an ever-present in two consecutive seasons for the club and making a total of 180 appearances.

In 1954 he would move to Wrexham spending three years at the club. Whilst there, in a match with Gateshead on 22 December 1956, where, during an altercation with Gateshead forward Bill Brown, he was punched unconscious by Brown. Green did not remember what had happened in a post-match interview.

He left Wrexham in 1957, going on to play for Wellington Town, Caernarfon Town and Pwllheli.

Green died in 1996.
