= Billy Green (Australian footballer) =

Australian rules footballer, born 1910

Personal information
- Full name: William Frederick Green
- Born: 1 January 1910; Melbourne, Victoria
- Died: 28 March 1995 (aged 85); Port Melbourne, Victoria
- Original team: Prahran Districts
- Height: 175 cm (5 ft 9 in)
- Weight: 74 kg (163 lb)

Playing career^{1}
Years	Club	Games (Goals)
1932–33	St Kilda	6 (9)
- ^{1} Playing statistics correct to the end of 1933.

William Frederick Green (1 January 1910 – 28 March 1995) was an Australian rules footballer who played with St Kilda in the Victorian Football League (VFL).
