= William R. Green Jr. =

American judge (c. 1889–1966)

William Raymond Green Jr. (September 7, 1889 – May 23, 1966) was a judge of the United States Board of Tax Appeals (later the United States Tax Court) from 1925 to 1929.

Born in Audubon, Iowa, Green was the son of William R. Green, who served in the United States Congress and later as a judge of the Court of Federal Claims. Green received a law degree from Creighton University in Idaho in 1911, and practiced law in that state for a time. He served as an officer in the United States Army Air Force during World War I, and prior to his appointment to the board of tax appeals in 1925, served in the office of the Treasury Solicitor.

Green resigned from the board of tax appeals to accept the position of general counsel for the Corning Glass Works in Corning, New York. He was succeeded on the board of tax appeals by Annabel Matthews, the first woman appointed to that body. By mid-1933, Green had formed a new law firm in New York with Hugh Satterlee, another former attorney from the Bureau of Internal Revenue. Green remained in practice with that firm until his retirement in the early 1950s, and moved to Delaware around 1966.

Green married Georgia Lloyd, with whom he had a daughter. Green died at a Delaware hospital following a brief illness, at the age of 77.
