= Tom Grieve (footballer) =

Scottish footballer

Personal information
- Full name: Thomas Grieve
- Date of birth: 7 July 1875
- Place of birth: Leith, Scotland
- Date of death: 28 November 1948 (aged 73)
- Place of death: Wishaw, Scotland
- Position: Outside right

Senior career*
Years	Team	Apps	(Gls)
1895–1898	Northfleet United	43	(8)
1898–1899	New Brompton	17	(6)
1899–1900	Gravesend United	28	(6)
1900–1901	Woolwich Arsenal	6	(0)
1901–1902	Brentford	22	(3)
1904	Watford	1	(0)
1904	Brighton & Hove Albion		
1905	Northfleet United		
- * Club domestic league appearances and goals

Thomas Grieve (7 July 1875 – 28 November 1948) was a professional footballer who played in the Football League for Woolwich Arsenal as an outside right.

== Personal life ==
Grieve served in the Royal Scots.

== Career statistics ==
Appearances and goals by club, season and competition
Club	Season	League			FA Cup		Total	
Club	Season	Division	Apps	Goals	Apps	Goals	Apps	Goals
New Brompton	1898–99	Southern League First Division	17	6	5	2	22	8
Woolwich Arsenal	1900–01	Second Division	6	0	0	0	6	0
Brentford	1901–02	Southern League First Division	22	1	0	0	22	1
Watford	1904–05	Southern League First Division	1	0	—		1	0
Career total			46	7	5	2	51	9
