= Bill Green (RAF officer) =

William James Green
- Born: William James Green; 23 April 1917; Bristol, England, UK
- Died: 7 November 2014 (aged 97); Bristol, England, UK
- Military career
- Allegiance: United Kingdom
- Branch: Royal Auxiliary Air Force; Royal Air Force
- Service years: 1936–1945
- Rank: Flight Lieutenant
- Nickname: Bill
- Unit: No. 501 Squadron RAF
- Conflicts: World War II: Battle of Britain,
- Other work: CEO, Crown Paints Ltd.

Flight Lieutenant William James Green AE (23 April 1917 – 7 November 2014) was a British fighter pilot, who served with the RAF during World War II. Green flew Hawker Hurricanes for nine days during the Battle of Britain, between 20 and 29 August 1940. During that time he was shot down twice: the first time on 24 August 1940, crash landing at Hawkinge, and again on 29 August over Deal in Kent.

== Royal Air Force ==
Green joined the Royal Auxiliary Air Force as an engine fitter in December 1936, and later trained as a pilot. On joining No. 501 Squadron RAF on 19 August 1940, Green had flown only about five hours in Hurricanes, and had only flown one for the first time the day before but was sent into action on 20 August 1940. Green considered himself to have been one of the least trained pilots during the Battle of Britain and lucky to have survived.

The first thing Green knew of being shot down on 29 August 1940 was a large hole appearing in his armoured windscreen; he never saw the aircraft that shot him down. He managed to exit his aircraft but his parachute initially failed to open as his drogue parachute lines had been cut about nine inches above where they joined the main parachute. His boots were ripped off his feet during the ensuing high-speed fall, and he later remembered quite clearly wondering whether his wife of 12 weeks, Bertha, would wonder whether he had wondered what it would feel like to "hit the deck". Green had resigned himself to his death, but just as he neared the treetops, the parachute eventually opened without the drogue, and he landed almost immediately in a farm in Elham Valley near Folkestone, only to discover that he couldn't stand as he had been wounded in the leg:

Two blokes came out of the farmhouse with shotguns and realised I was English. They helped me up and I couldn't stand because I'd been hit, without knowing it, in the leg. They took me back to the farmhouse and gave me a cup of tea and that was the end of the Battle of Britain as far as I was concerned.

He continued to serve in the RAF, rising from the rank of Sergeant Pilot to Flight Lieutenant.

== Later life ==
Prior to retirement, Bill Green was chair of Reed International and managing director of Crown Paints.

Bill Green resided for the final years of his life in the Bristol area, and was one of the last living members of The Few. He was involved with several ex-service charities, including the Royal Air Forces Association and the Local & County Air Cadets Organization.

Bill Green died on 7 November 2014, aged 97. On the day of his funeral, two minutes of silence were held, and the flag was lowered to half mast at the Crown Paints facility in Darwen.
