= Willie Green (baseball) =

American baseball player (1894–1925)

- Third baseman
- Born: 1894
- Died: June 4, 1925 (aged 30–31); Chicago, Illinois, U.S.
- Threw: Right

debut
- 1915, for the Chicago American Giants

Last appearance
- 1924, for the Kansas City Monarchs
- Stats at Baseball Reference

Teams
- Chicago American Giants (1915); Chicago Giants (1915–1921); Detroit Stars (1919–1920); Pittsburgh Keystones (1922); Kansas City Monarchs (1924)

William Green (1894 – June 4, 1925) was an American Negro league baseball third baseman for several years before the founding of the first Negro National League, and in its first few seasons.

He played most of his career for the Chicago Giants.
