= Charlie McEleny =

Irish footballer (1874–1908)

Personal information
- Full name: Charles Richard McEleny
- Date of birth: 3 March 1874
- Place of birth: Raymoghy, Ireland
- Date of death: 1 August 1908 (aged 34)
- Place of death: Greenock, Scotland
- Position: Centre half

Youth career
- Greenock Volunteers

Senior career*
Years	Team	Apps	(Gls)
–1893	Abercorn		
1893–1895	Celtic	4	(0)
1895–1896	Burnley	15	(1)
1896–1898	Celtic	13	(1)
1898–1899	New Brighton Tower	31	(0)
1899–1900	Aston Villa	1	(0)
1900–1901	Swindon Town	29	(1)
1901–1902	Brentford	26	(1)
1902	Morton	3	(0)
- * Club domestic league appearances and goals

Charles Richard McEleny (3 March 1874 – 1 August 1908) was an Irish professional footballer who mostly played as a centre half.

== Football career ==
Born in Raymoghy, County Donegal, McEleny moved to Scotland where he first played for Greenock Volunteers before joining Abercorn. He signed for Celtic in November 1893 and played his first match on 4 November in a 3–1 league victory against Dundee at Parkhead. McEleny was a strong and powerful centre half and established himself as a first team regular. Charlie was the first ever Irish born player to play for Glasgow Celtic.

In November 1895 he signed for English side Burnley where he made 15 Football League appearances, before returning to Celtic in May 1896. Playing only a year he moved south again to play for New Brighton Tower. In his two spells at Celtic, McEleny played 41 games and scored once.

In May 1899, McEleny signed for Aston Villa where he played as a half back in his solitary first team appearance before leaving Villa in May 1900.

He then joined Swindon Town of the Southern League where he made a total of 48 appearances, scoring twice. He then had a spell at Brentford before returning to Scotland with Morton.

== Later career and death ==
On quitting football he worked as a painter/decorator.

McEleny died on 1 August 1908 aged 34 at Smithston, Greenock.
