= Tommy Shanks =

Irish footballer (1880-1919)

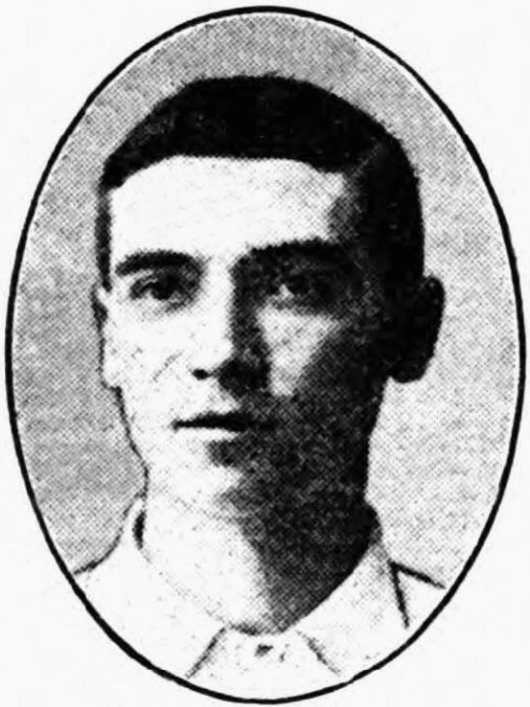
- Shanks while with Brentford in 1905.

Personal information
- Full name: Thomas Shanks
- Date of birth: 30 March 1880
- Place of birth: New Ross, Ireland
- Date of death: 1 March 1919 (aged 38)
- Place of death: Billericay, England
- Position: Inside forward

Youth career
- Wexford

Senior career*
Years	Team	Apps	(Gls)
- Derby West End
- Derby Fosse
1898–1900	Derby County	27	(9)
1901–1903	Brentford	36	(10)
1902–1903	Woolwich Arsenal	44	(28)
1904–1906	Brentford	53	(17)
1906–1909	Leicester Fosse	57	(16)
1909–1911	Leyton		
1911–1912	Clapton Orient	0	(0)
1912–1913	York City		

International career
1903–1905	Ireland	3	(0)
- * Club domestic league appearances and goals

Thomas Shanks (30 March 1880 – 1 March 1919) was an Irish footballer.

== Career ==
Shanks was born in Wexford and started his playing career with local club Wexford before moving to England to play for Derby West End and then Derby County in 1898. He spent three seasons at the Baseball Ground, playing 28 times and scoring 9 goals, but could not hold down a regular place. In October 1901 he moved to Brentford of the Southern League, helping the Bees to promotion to Division One, before being signed by Second Division Woolwich Arsenal in January 1903.

He made his Arsenal debut against Burslem Port Vale on 10 January 1903 and went on to be a regular that season as an inside forward, scoring five times. His performances for his club earned him the first of three caps for Ireland, against Scotland on 21 March 1903. Shanks' 1903–04 season was a record-breaking one; he scored 24 goals that season, including four hat-tricks, as Arsenal earned promotion to the First Division. He was the first Arsenal player ever to score more than 20 in a league season. However, a cash-strapped Arsenal sold him back to Brentford in the summer of 1904 and he never played for Arsenal in the top flight. In all he played 48 matches and scored 29 goals for the Woolwich Reds.

He played for another two seasons in the Southern League for Brentford before returning to League football with Leicester Fosse in 1906. In three seasons with Leicester he scored 16 goals in 59 appearances, including the only goal in a 1–0 win over Stoke in April 1908, which earned them promotion to the First Division for the first time. In 1909 he moved back to London to play for Leyton and saw out his career at Clapton Orient and York City.
