= Billy Green (footballer, born 1881) =

English footballer

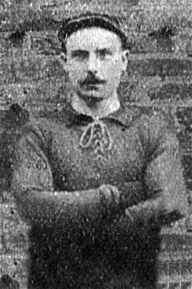
- Green while with Burnley 1904.

Personal information
- Full name: William John Green
- Date of birth: 13 January 1881
- Place of birth: Gravesend, England
- Date of death: 31 January 1951 (aged 69)
- Place of death: Gravesend, England
- Position: Goalkeeper

Senior career*
| Years | Team | Apps | (Gls) |
| 1900 | Gravesend United | | |
| 1900–1903 | Brentford | 23 | (0) |
| 1903–1908 | Burnley | 147 | (0) |
| 1908–1910 | Bradford Park Avenue | 31 | (0) |
| 1910–1915 | Morley Town | | |
| Total | | 178 | (0) |
- * Club domestic league appearances and goals

William John Green (13 January 1881 – 31 January 1951) was an English professional footballer who played as a goalkeeper.

== Career ==
Born in Gravesend, Kent, Green began his career in non-league football with Gravesend United and Brentford before being signed by Second Division side Burnley in 1903. In five seasons with the Clarets he played 147 league games before transferring to Bradford Park Avenue at the beginning of the 1908–09 season. He spent two seasons with Bradford Park Avenue and played 31 league matches before retiring in 1910.
