= Grays United F.C. =

Grays United
- Full name: Grays United Football Club
- Ground: Recreation Ground
- 1905–06: Southern League Division Two, 10/13

Grays United F.C. was a football club based in Grays, Essex, England. The club played at the Recreation Ground.

The club joined Division Two of the Southern League in 1899. In 1900–01 they finished second and qualified for the promotion-relegation test matches. However, after the game against Division One club Watford ended 0–0, Grays refused to play extra time, and were subsequently not promoted. The following season they finished runners-up again, and faced a test-match for a second successive season, this time against Brentford. The match, played at the Memorial Grounds, was drawn 1–1, but the club again refused to play extra time, and were not promoted.

The club withdrew from the Southern League at the end of the 1905–06 season and merged with Grays Juniors to form Grays Athletic.
