= 1900–01 Southampton F.C. season =

English football club season

Southampton F.C.
1900–01 season
- Chairman: Dr. Ernest Stancomb
- Secretary: Er Arnfield
- Stadium: The Dell
- Southern League: Champions
- FA Cup: Round 1
- Top goalscorer: League: Edgar Chadwick (14); All: Edgar Chadwick (15)
- Highest home attendance: 12,000 vs Everton (9 February 1901) (FA Cup)
Home colours

The 1900–01 season was the 16th since the foundation of Southampton F.C. and their seventh in league football, as members of the Southern League.

The club were unable to repeat their success in the FA Cup and were eliminated in the First Round, but compensated for this failure by claiming the Southern League title for the fourth time in five seasons.

== Club finances ==
The run to the FA Cup Final in 1900 had generated a surplus of £31 but the club were still £1,000 in debt. In July 1900, the company made a call on its shares in an effort to raise cash. The response to the call was disappointing with many shareholders having their shares forfeited as a result of their failure to pay the balance due.

The financial situation worsened in 1900–01, with the gates dwindling following the doubling of the entrance fees the previous year from sixpence to a shilling, and the club generated a loss of £740.

== Personnel ==
After the disappointing end to the previous season and the embarrassing failure in the FA Cup Final, there was a "drastic" clear-out of players. Both the players at the centre of the dispute surrounding the team selection for the final, Roddy McLeod and Jack Farrell were released, as were defenders Meechan, Durber and Petrie. Another significant departure was Alfred McMinn who resigned as a director; McMinn had made a major contribution to the club's success, particularly with his ability to spot a good player, leading the "Stoke Invasion" in the summer of 1895.

The new recruits included three players from Everton, full-backs George Molyneux and Bertram Sharp and centre-forward Wilf Toman as well as former Everton and England forward Edgar Chadwick, who would renew his partnership with Alf Milward which had been described as "the best in the league" during their time together at Everton. From local football, the club recruited two players who were to play a major role in the future of the club: Bert Lee would have two long periods with the club as a player before becoming a trainer from 1914 to 1935. Fred Harrison would remain at The Dell for seven years and become the club's main goalscorer, with 88 goals from 166 appearances.

In view of the club's financial difficulties, the board also decided to recruit top amateur players. The first to join the club was Leslie Gay, who had made three appearances as goalkeeper for England in 1893 and 1894, although Gay never played in a first-team match for Southampton. Another amateur goalkeeper, the South African Wilf Waller also joined the club on a part-time basis and played in the opening match of the season when Jack Robinson was suspended. In December, C. B. Fry (described as "arguably the greatest all-round sportsman of his generation") did play for the club, making his debut at right-back in the Boxing Day match against Tottenham Hotspur. In January, the club made an offer to another Corinthian player, G. O. Smith, who had been the England captain and was widely considered as the world's best player of the 19th Century. The approach was unsuccessful, with Smith responding that he "thought it impossible to assist our club in cup ties [but] wishing us every success."

== League season ==
The Saints started their attempt to regain the Southern League trophy with a 4–3 win at Luton Town followed by a defeat at West Ham United and a goalless draw at Portsmouth. Portsmouth were top of the table having won their opening three matches and the local newspaper claimed that, while Southampton were "under a cloud", "the Portsmouth star is shining conspicuously in the footballing firmament". A crowd of between 10,000 and 12,000 saw the clubs play a "clinking ding-dong, robust game" which Portsmouth looked most likely to win.

After this stuttering start to the season, the Saints settled down with a run of 12 victories in the next 13 matches. The final three months of the season were more erratic with three defeats in the final two months of the season, but the Saints had done enough to hang on at the top of the table, to claim the Southern League title for the fourth time.

The second meeting with local rivals, Portsmouth, came on Easter Saturday, 6 April. With three matches left to play, Southampton led the table but Portsmouth had a game in hand and could still overhaul the Saints, although their away form was poor. With Portsmouth having several players out injured, Saints took the lead after ten minutes when Milward was fouled; Lee's "beautifully placed" free kick was "piloted" into the goal by Milward. Milward scored again late in the second half from Edgar Chadwick's pass.

There was a marked difference between the results at The Dell and away. Of the 14 home matches, all resulted in wins other than the final home match of the season, a goalless draw with Reading. Away from home, the Saints won only five matches, with four draws and five defeats.

== League results ==
Date	Opponents	H / A	Result F – A	Scorers
1 September 1900	Luton Town	A	4–3	Turner (2), E. Chadwick, Yates
15 September 1900	West Ham United	A	0–2	
22 September 1900	Portsmouth	A	0–0	
29 September 1900	New Brompton	A	1–0	E. Chadwick
6 October 1900	Bristol Rovers	H	5–3	E. Chadwick (2), Milward, Toman, Wood
13 October 1900	Reading	A	1–0	Toman
20 October 1900	Kettering Town	H	4–3	Lee, Meston, Milward, E. Chadwick
27 October 1900	Gravesend United	H	6–0	Turner (2), Wood (2), A. Chadwick, E. Chadwick
3 November 1900	Millwall Athletic	H	2–1	E. Chadwick, Wood
10 November 1900	Queens Park Rangers	A	1–0	Turner
24 November 1900	Bristol City	H	2–1	E. Chadwick, Lee
1 December 1900	Swindon Town	A	1–2	E. Chadwick
8 December 1900	Watford	H	1–0	Wood
17 December 1900	Luton Town	H	5–0	Milward (3), E. Chadwick, Turner
26 December 1900	Tottenham Hotspur	H	3–1	E. Chadwick, Toman, Wood
30 December 1900	West Ham United	H	3–2	Meston, Milward, Wood
12 January 1901	New Brompton	H	5–0	Wood (2), E. Chadwick, Milward, Toman
19 January 1901	Bristol Rovers	A	0–0	
16 February 1901	Gravesend United	A	4–0	Toman (2), E. Chadwick, Turner
23 February 1901	Millwall Athletic	A	0–1	
2 March 1901	Queens Park Rangers	H	5–1	Milward (3), E. Chadwick, Toman
16 March 1901	Bristol City	A	1–1	Sharp
23 March 1901	Swindon Town	H	1–0	Yates
30 March 1901	Watford	A	1–1	Wood
5 April 1901	Tottenham Hotspur	A	0–1	
6 April 1901	Portsmouth	H	2–0	Milward (2)
8 April 1901	Reading	H	0–0	
10 April 1901	Kettering Town	A	0–3	

=== Legend ===
Win	Draw	Loss

=== Top of league table ===
Pos	Team	Pld	W	D	L	GF	GA	GR	Pts	Promotion or relegation
1	Southampton	28	18	5	5	58	26	2.231	41	
2	Bristol City	28	17	5	6	54	27	2.000	39	Elected to the Football League Second Division
3	Portsmouth	28	17	4	7	56	32	1.750	38	
4	Millwall Athletic	28	17	2	9	55	32	1.719	36	
5	Tottenham Hotspur	28	16	4	8	55	33	1.667	36	

Rules for classification: The system of using goal average to separate two teams tied on points was used up until the 1976-77 season. The points system: 2 points for a win, 1 point for a draw and 0 points for losing.

== FA Cup ==
The draw for the First Round of the FA Cup produced a repeat of the same stage from the previous season, a home match against Everton of the Football League First Division. The match was scheduled to be held on 26 January, but all football was postponed following the death of Queen Victoria on 22 January. The match was played a fortnight later on 9 February, by which time Harry Wood and Arthur Chadwick were both injured and unable to play. Chadwick's place was taken by Ted Killean making his debut for Southampton.

Saints struggled to reproduce their league form, although Edgar Chadwick gave them a half-time lead. Everton overran the Saints in the second half, with goals from Jimmy Settle, Jack Taylor and Joe Turner, who had left Southampton in 1898 (but would return in 1901).

Fellow Southern League side, Tottenham Hotspur reached the Cup Final thus becoming the second Southern League side to do so, after Southampton in the previous year. Spurs were also the first London-based club to reach the final since 1880. Tottenham went one better than Southampton by defeating Sheffield United 3–1 in a replay at Bolton Wanderers Burnden Park ground; the attendance for the first match at Crystal Palace was officially 110,820, which was the largest FA Cup Final crowd to that date, and only exceeded by the 1913 and 1923 finals, whereas the attendance for the replay was only 20,470.

=== FA Cup results ===
Date	Round	Opponents	H / A	Result F – A	Scorers	Attendance
9 February 1901	Round 1	Everton	H	1–3	E. Chadwick	12,000

== International football at The Dell ==
On 9 March 1901, England played their Home Championship match against Ireland at The Dell. As Ireland had been beaten 11–0 by Scotland a fortnight earlier, the England selectors chose a mainly second-string team with five players making their full England debuts, including C. B. Fry (listed as a Corinthian player) and two other Southern League players, Millwall's Bert Banks and Billy Jones of Bristol City. The other debutantes were Liverpool's Jack Cox and George Hedley from Sheffield United – of the debutantes, only Cox would play another match for England. The other Southampton players selected were Archie Turner, making his second (and final) international appearance, and Jack Robinson, who was now the established England goalkeeper. The line-up was completed by Tip Foster and William Oakley (both Corinthians), earning their 2nd and 14th caps respectively, Tommy Crawshaw (Sheffield Wednesday), earning his 8th cap, and Ernest Needham (Sheffield United), earning his 13th cap.

The match was played at The Dell in front of a modest crowd of 8,000 who had expected a "landslide" victory, especially as the Irish players had experienced bad weather on their ferry crossing. Although England scored after only nine minutes through Crawshaw, the expected landslide did not materialise and it was not until the final ten minutes that Foster added two further goals. Archie Turner left the pitch with an injury after 20 minutes and England played the remainder of the game with only ten men. C. B. Fry later said of the match: "It was a very bad match. It was one of those games which, without any obvious reason, are aimless and vague and watery ... It was one of the least enjoyable games from a players' point of view that have ever fallen to my lot."

This was the only full international played at The Dell. None of the Southampton players played for England again after this match.

== Tour of Europe ==
In April 1901, the Saints embarked on their first-ever tour of Europe visiting The Netherlands, Austria and Hungary. All seven matches were won, with a total of 50 goals scored and 3 conceded; the largest score was in the final match, against a Hungarian Combined XI, which was won 13–0.

In one of the matches in Vienna, goalkeeper Jack Robinson gave a goalkeeping exhibition in which he produced several diving saves. His saves from low shots, "by flying through the air with great ease", became known in Austria and Hungary as a "Robinsonade", a name which was used until the 1950s.

== Player statistics ==
Position	Nationality	Name	League apps	League goals	FA Cup apps	FA Cup goals	Total apps	Total goals
FB	England	Arthur Blackburn	9	0	0	0	9	0
FW	England	Sid Cavendish	1	0	0	0	1	0
HB	England	Arthur Chadwick	19	1	0	0	19	1
FW	England	Edgar Chadwick	27	14	1	1	28	15
HB	England	Joe French	3	0	0	0	3	0
FB	England	C. B. Fry	5	0	1	0	6	0
GK	England	Leslie Gay	0	0	0	0	0	0
FW	England	Fred Harrison	1	0	0	0	1	0
HB	England	Ted Killean	2	0	1	0	3	0
HB	England	Bert Lee	21	2	1	0	22	2
HB	Scotland	Samuel Meston	28	2	1	0	29	2
FW	England	Alf Milward	28	12	1	0	29	12
GK	England	Harry Moger	4	0	0	0	4	0
FB	England	George Molyneux	28	0	1	0	29	0
HB	England	Bert Paddington	3	0	0	0	3	0
GK	England	Jack Robinson	22	0	1	0	23	0
FB	England	Bertram Sharp	22	1	0	0	22	1
FW	England	Henry Small	0	0	0	0	0	0
HB	England	Victor Smith	0	0	0	0	0	0
FW	England	Henry Smoker	0	0	0	0	0	0
FW	England	Wilf Toman	19	7	1	0	20	7
FB	England	Walter Triggs	0	0	0	0	0	0
FW	England	Archie Turner	20	7	1	0	21	7
GK	South Africa	Wilf Waller	2	0	0	0	2	0
FW	England	Harry Wood	27	10	0	0	27	10
FW	England	Jimmy Yates	17	2	1	0	18	2

=== Key ===
- GK – Goalkeeper
- FB – Full-back
- HB – Half-back
- FW – Forward

== Transfers ==
=== In ===
Date	Position	Name	From
May 1900	FB	Arthur Blackburn	Blackburn Rovers
August 1900	FW	Edgar Chadwick	Burnley
December 1900	FB	C. B. Fry	Corinthian^{a}
Summer 1900	GK	Leslie Gay	Corinthian^{a}
September 1900	FW	Fred Harrison	Bitterne Guild
Summer 1900	HB	Ted Killean	Glossop
April 1900	HB	Bert Lee	Poole
Summer 1900	GK	Harry Moger	Freemantle
May 1900	FB	George Molyneux	Everton
May 1900	FB	Bertram Sharp	Everton
Summer 1900	FW	Henry Small	Freemantle
Summer 1900	FW	Henry Smoker	Local football
Summer 1900	FW	Wilf Toman	Everton
Summer 1900	FB	Walter Triggs	Freemantle
September 1900	GK	Wilf Waller	Bolton Wanderers^{b}

=== Departures ===
Date	Position	Name	To
Summer 1900	FB	Peter Durber	Stoke
Summer 1900	HB	Frank Englefield	Freemantle
June 1900	FW	Jack Farrell	New Brighton Tower
Summer 1900	FB	Ernest Gill	Freemantle
Summer 1900	HB	Don Greenlees	St Mirren
Summer 1900	FB	Harry Haynes	Retired
May 1900	GK	John Joyce	Millwall Athletic
Summer 1900	FW	Watty Keay	Retired
May 1900	FW	Duncan McLean	Derby County
August 1900	FW	Roddy McLeod	Brentford
September 1900	FB	Peter Meechan	Manchester City
October 1900	HB	Bob Petrie	New Brighton Tower

== Notes ==
- ^a C. B. Fry and Leslie Gay were both amateurs and continued to play for Corinthian as well as for Southampton.
- ^b Wilf Waller was an amateur and continued to play for Bolton Wanderers. He also played for the Scottish amateur side, Queens Park in 1900–01.

== Bibliography ==
- Bull, David; Brunskell, Bob (2000). Match of the Millennium. Hagiology Publishing. ISBN 0-9534474-1-3.
- Chalk, Gary; Holley, Duncan (1987). Saints – A complete record. Breedon Books. ISBN 0-907969-22-4.
- Collett, Mike (2003). The Complete Record of the FA Cup. Sports Books. ISBN 1-8998-0719-5.
- Hodgson, Francis (1998). Only the Goalkeeper To Beat. Macmillan. ISBN 0-333-68693-4.
- Holley, Duncan (2012). Suited and Booted. Bristol: Hagiology Publishing. ISBN 978-0-9534474-9-7.
- Holley, Duncan; Chalk, Gary (1992). The Alphabet of the Saints. ACL & Polar Publishing. ISBN 0-9514862-3-3.
- Juson, Dave; Bull, David (2001). Full-Time at The Dell. Hagiology Publishing. ISBN 0-9534474-2-1.
- Juson, Dave (2004). Saints v Pompey – A history of unrelenting rivalry. Hagiology Publishing. ISBN 0-9534-4745-6.
- Lloyd, Guy; Holt, Nick (2005). The F.A. Cup – The Complete Story. Aurum Press. ISBN 1-8451-3054-5.
- Seddon, Peter (2004). Football Talk: The Language & Folklore Of The World's Greatest Game. Robson Books. ISBN 978-1861056832.
- Wilton, Iain (2000). C.B. Fry: An English Hero. London: Metro Books. ISBN 978-1-86066-180-8.
