= 1899–1900 Southampton F.C. season =

English association football season

Southampton F.C.
1899–1900 season
- Chairman: Dr. Ernest Stancomb
- Secretary: Er Arnfield
- Stadium: The Dell
- Southern League: Third
- FA Cup: Runners-up
- Top goalscorer: League: Alf Milward (28); All: Alf Milward (24)
- Highest home attendance: 10,000 vs Everton (27 January 1900) (FA Cup)
Home colours

The 1899–1900 season was the 15th since the foundation of Southampton F.C. and their sixth in league football, as members of the Southern League.

They ended the season third in the Southern League, but reached the final of the FA Cup, thus becoming the first southern professional side to do so, and the first side from south of the midlands since 1883. In the final, they played badly as a result of divisions amongst the players and lost 4–0 to Bury.

== Start of the season ==
Having won the Southern League title in each of the three previous seasons, Southampton were now considered to be the best football team in England outside The Football League. The club had considered applying to join the league but decided that, because of their location on the south coast, the cost of travelling would be prohibitive. The popular boys' newspaper, Chums featured the club in their October 1899 edition:

The Southampton club is the surprise packet of the football world. No team can boast of having fought their way to the front with such lightning-like rapidity as the champions of the South and, if the opinion of experienced judges are worth anything, the Southampton men have absolutely no superiors. It is true that they do not engage in first League duels, but the reason they do not do so is not that they consider they stand no chance of achieving premier honours, but that the departure would not pay them. There are no League clubs in the South^{a}, the consequence being that if Southampton were to enter for the competition, about half their time would be spent in travelling to the North and back — a proceeding that would soon land them high and dry in Bankruptcy Court.

With the club £1,000 in debt and in an attempt to ensure success on the pitch, the directors had recruited several top-class players on substantial wages. In order to meet these, the cost of entry to home matches was doubled from sixpence to a shilling. The opening Southern League match was attended by a meeting of "anti-bobs" in Milton Road; "after [their] grievances had been aired, the participants therein wended their way to other haunts than the football field". As a result, the attendance for the match against New Brompton was "disappointingly small" with "barely two thousand people present". Explaining the decision to double the price of admission, the secretary Mr. Arnfield told the Football Echo

Candidly, I don't like it personally, but if we don't get enough 'tanners' we must have the 'bobs'. There is [an] alternative ... to an occasional shilling gate, and that is to reduce the wages of players, which means inferior men. After all the brilliant players we have had, Southampton people won't put up with a mediocre team. Why, our people would throw bricks at us.
The Board are particularly anxious to retain a good team, but you must remember we have a big deficit and our summer wage bill is within £12 of our winter one, whilst for over four months we have not taken a penny.

== Players ==
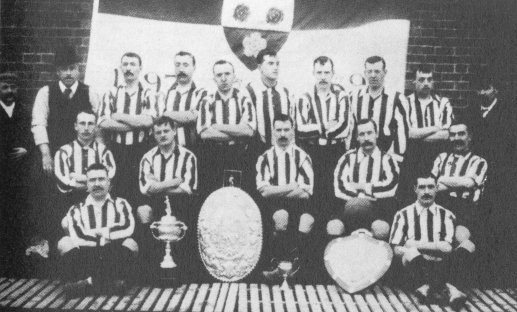
The Southampton team at the start of the season with the Southern League trophy and the silk banner presented to them by the Southern League for winning the championship in three successive seasons. (Standing: E. Arnfield (secretary), W. Dawson (trainer), S. Meston, H. Haynes, A. Chadwick, J. Robinson, D. Greenlees, P. Meechan, P. Durber, E. C. Jarvis (director). Seated: A. Turner, J. Yates, J. Farrell, H. Wood, A. Milward. On floor: R. McLeod, R. Petrie).

During the summer of 1899, several players left the club including forward Abe Hartley, who joined Woolwich Arsenal, and Jacky Robertson, who joined Rangers, shortly after becoming the first Southampton player to play for Scotland in April 1899.

Three forwards joined the club in the pre-season: Jack Farrell returned from Stoke, where he had spent the 1898–99 season having played for Southampton from 1895 to 1898, and Archie Turner was recruited from East & West Surrey League club St. Michael's, Camberley, but the major signing was former England international Alf Milward from Football League Second Division side New Brighton Tower.

The team mow consisted mainly of experienced former Football League players. Ten players appeared in all six F.A. Cup matches and twenty or more Southern League matches, with Alf Milward being ever-present and becoming the team's top goal-scorer. The team had three past or present England internationals (goalkeeper Jack Robinson and forwards Alf Milward and Harry Wood), while full-back Peter Meechan had previously played for Scotland. Archie Turner was the only regular player to have been born in Hampshire and was also the only player not to have previously played in The Football League, but he ended the season by achieving the then unique distinction of being called up for England in his first season in first-class football, and also becoming the first Hampshire-born player to represent England.

Goalkeeper Jack Robinson had previously played for Derby County and was the current England international 'keeper. The full-backs were Peter Durber and Peter Meechan who had previously played for Stoke and Everton respectively. Centre-half Arthur Chadwick had previously played for Burton Swifts and would end the season with two England caps. Either side of him were Scotsmen, Samuel Meston (another former Stoke player) and Bob Petrie, formerly with Sheffield Wednesday. The centre-forward position was contested by Jack Farrell and former West Bromwich Albion and Leicester Fosse player Roddy McLeod. Alongside Archie Turner on the right was Jimmy Yates, previously with Sheffield United and Ardwick, with the two former England internationals, Alf Milward and Harry Wood on the left.

Several of the players were on high wages with Wood on £5 a week and Robinson earning £5 10s with the total wages bill exceeding £60 per week, which with bonuses put the annual total to in excess of £4,000, a total believed to be exceeded by only five or six Football League clubs.

In an interview with the boys' paper Chums, the club's "popular secretary and manager, Mr. Arnfield" said:

In the main, [the cause of our success is] our bold forward policy of engaging only tip-top players. No man is good enough for us who isn't good enough to take his place in any team in England. We shouldn't dream of engaging a player who wasn't worthy of inclusion in the Aston Villa eleven, for instance. This is our Standard.

== League season ==
For the 1899–1900 season, the Southern League had been expanded from the 13 clubs, which had ended the 1898–99 season to 17 by the admission of Bristol Rovers and Queens Park Rangers and the promotion of Cowes and Thames Ironworks. The newly formed Portsmouth club inherited the place vacated by the Royal Artillery. Of the 17 clubs, Cowes and Brighton United failed to complete the season, with their records being expunged.

The season started with a comfortable home 6–2 win over New Brompton but this was followed by a draw at Gravesend United and defeat at home to Swindon Town. After the 3–1 victory at Bristol City on 23 September, Roddy McLeod was dropped to be replaced by Archie Turner on the right-wing. This was the start of a run of twelve games with only one defeat and by mid-January, the Saints were at the top of the table. Amongst the victories were defeats of Chatham 9–0 on 20 December (with four goals from Turner) and of Gravesend 8–0 on 6 January.

The season was then interrupted by bad weather and by the time the league restarted in early March, Saints were without Jack Farrell who had been seriously injured in the F.A. Cup match against Newcastle United. He was replaced by Roddy McLeod but the FA Cup run distracted the team from the league, which resulted in a run of poor performances. The 2–0 defeat at Tottenham Hotspur on Good Friday 13 April finally extinguished any chance of retaining the title.

There then followed consecutive matches against newcomers, Portsmouth to decide who would come second to Tottenham. The match at The Dell on Saturday 14 April was attended by "barely 3,000" supporters with the home fans being more interested in the Cup Final the following Saturday. Despite the Saints' best efforts, they were thwarted by "Gunner" Matt Reilly in the Portsmouth goal, and Saints went down to goals from Sandy Brown and Dan Cunliffe. The return match at Fratton Park two days later, was attended by an Easter Monday crowd of 10,000 supporters who witnessed a "complete triumph" for Portsmouth with the two goals coming from Sandy Brown and Billy Smith.

Saints' performance against Portsmouth was described as "poor in the extreme" and "there was really no comparison between the two teams". The Portsmouth manager, Frank Brettell described Southampton as "stale" and predicted a "comfortable" victory for Bury in the FA Cup Final.

After the humiliating 4–0 defeat in the final, Saints played out the remaining three "dead" matches including victories at home to Bristol City and Millwall, in both of which McLeod (who had not been selected for the Cup Final) scored.

The league season ended with Southampton third in the table, nine points behind champions, Tottenham Hotspur.

== League results ==
| Date | Opponents | H / A | Result F – A | Scorers |
|---|---|---|---|---|
| 2 September 1899 | New Brompton | H | 6 – 2 | Milward (2), Yates (2), Farrell, Wood |
| 9 September 1899 | Gravesend United | A | 2 – 2 | Farrell, Milward |
| 16 September 1899 | Swindon Town | H | 0 – 1 | |
| 23 September 1899 | Bristol City | A | 3 – 1 | Milward (2), Farrell |
| 14 October 1899 | Millwall Athletic | A | 2 – 0 | Milward, Turner |
| 21 October 1899 | Queens Park Rangers | H | 5 – 1 | Milward (2), Yates (2), Turner |
| 4 November 1899 | Reading | H | 0 – 2 | |
| 11 November 1899 | Sheppey United | A | 2 – 0 | Meston (2) |
| 25 November 1899 | Bedminster | A | 2 – 0 | Farrell, Milward |
| 2 December 1899 | Bristol Rovers | H | 4 – 0 | Milward (2), Farrell, McLeod |
| 16 December 1899 | Thames Ironworks | H | 3 – 1 | Milward (2), Turner |
| 20 December 1899 | Chatham | H | 9 – 0 | Turner (4), Farrell, Milward, Petrie, Wood, Yates |
| 26 December 1899 | Tottenham Hotspur | H | 3 – 1 | Farrell (2), Milward |
| 30 December 1899 | New Brompton | A | 2 – 1 | Farrell, Milward |
| 6 January 1900 | Gravesend United | H | 8 – 0 | Farrell (2), Milward (2), Cavendish, Chadwick, Meechan, Yates |
| 13 January 1900 | Swindon Town | A^{b} | 1 – 2 | Meston |
| 3 March 1900 | Chatham Town | A | 0 – 1 | |
| 10 March 1900 | Reading | A | 0 – 2 | |
| 17 March 1900 | Sheppey United | H | 5 – 0 | Milward (2), Wood (2), Farrell |
| 31 March 1900 | Bedminster | H | 3 – 2 | Milward (2), McLeod |
| 7 April 1900 | Bristol Rovers | A | 3 – 1 | McLeod, Wood, Yates |
| 9 April 1900 | Thames Ironworks | A | 1 – 4 | McLeod |
| 13 April 1900 | Tottenham Hotspur | A | 0 – 2 | |
| 14 April 1900 | Portsmouth | H | 0 – 2 | |
| 16 April 1900 | Portsmouth | A | 0 – 2 | |
| 23 April 1900 | Bristol City | H | 4 – 1 | Milward (2), McLeod, Wood |
| 25 April 1900 | Millwall Athletic | H | 2 – 1 | McLeod, Yates |
| 28 April 1900 | Queens Park Rangers | A | 0 – 1 | |

=== Legend ===
| Win | Draw | Loss |

=== Top of league table ===
| Pos | Team | Pld | W | D | L | GF | GA | GR | Pts | Qualification or relegation |
|---|---|---|---|---|---|---|---|---|---|---|
| 1 | Tottenham Hotspur | 28 | 20 | 4 | 4 | 67 | 26 | 2.577 | 44 | |
| 2 | Portsmouth | 28 | 20 | 1 | 7 | 59 | 29 | 2.034 | 41 | Directly elected into Division One (Note: Portsmouth founded 5 April 1898, before Royal Artillery Portsmouth disbanded in 1899.) |
| 3 | Southampton | 28 | 17 | 1 | 10 | 70 | 33 | 2.121 | 35 | |
| 4 | Reading | 28 | 15 | 2 | 11 | 41 | 28 | 1.464 | 32 | |
| 5 | Swindon Town | 28 | 15 | 2 | 11 | 50 | 42 | 1.190 | 32 | |

Source: rsssf.com
Rules for classification: The system of using goal average to separate two teams tied on points was used up until the 1976–77 season (note: source does not refer to goal average). The points system: 2 points for a win, 1 point for a draw and 0 points for losing.

== FA Cup ==
In the FA Cup, Saints were no longer required to qualify and entered at the first round proper, where they met Everton, who had finished in fourth place in the First Division in 1899. Everton were easily beaten in a "stunning" 3–0 victory with former Everton player Alf Milward scoring twice.

The next visitors to The Dell were Newcastle United who Southampton had defeated at the same stage two years earlier. The match was played on 10 February 1900 in wintery conditions. With the match goalless, Jack Farrell was forced to leave the pitch with a dislocated left collar-bone. Southampton played on with ten men until the 50th minute, when referee Arthur Kingscott abandoned the match because of a heavy snowstorm. The sides met again the following Saturday, with Roddy McLeod replacing the injured Farrell. McLeod "seized the opportunity" and scored twice in an easy 4–1 victory.

The third-round match was played a week later against another First Division side, West Bromwich Albion against whom McLeod scored again in a 2–1 victory.

With fellow Southern League team Millwall Athletic having defeated Football League champions Aston Villa in their Round 3 match, after the third of three "epic confrontations", the four semi-finalists were Millwall and Southampton from the Southern League and Bury and Nottingham Forest of the Football League First Division. The draw for the semi-final paired the Southern League and Football League sides, thus guaranteeing that a side from the Southern League would reach the FA Cup Final for the first time.

To prepare for the semi-final, the Southampton players were sent to Buxton for a week's special training starting with morning walks "certainly the fat ones" followed by a bath. The team's secretary, Mr. Arnfield explained the training routine to Chums magazine:

... in the afternoon, sprinting and ball-kicking are the order. Baths are capital for removing stiffness from the joints. And ... everyone in training should go to bed early. Our fellows usually retire at ten, but the night before a big match they are all in bed by nine, They enjoy a long sleep, and don't appear for breakfast before nine.
Our diet is an extremely plain one. The customary fare consists of fish, chops and steaks. Vegetables and sweets are banned when a match is about to be played and so are spirits. Half a pint of beer per meal, however, is allowed, and directly the match is over, the players can eat whatever they please. As regards smoking, we only prohibit it on the morning preceding a big match.

The semi-final was played at Crystal Palace on 24 March, with a 30,000 crowd seeing a "disappointing" goalless draw. The replay was the following Wednesday at Reading's Elm Park when a crowd of only 10,000 saw Alf Milward at his "electrifying best", scoring two goals in a straightforward 3–0 victory, to put the Saints through to their first appearance in the final less than 15 years after the club was founded.

=== FA Cup Final ===
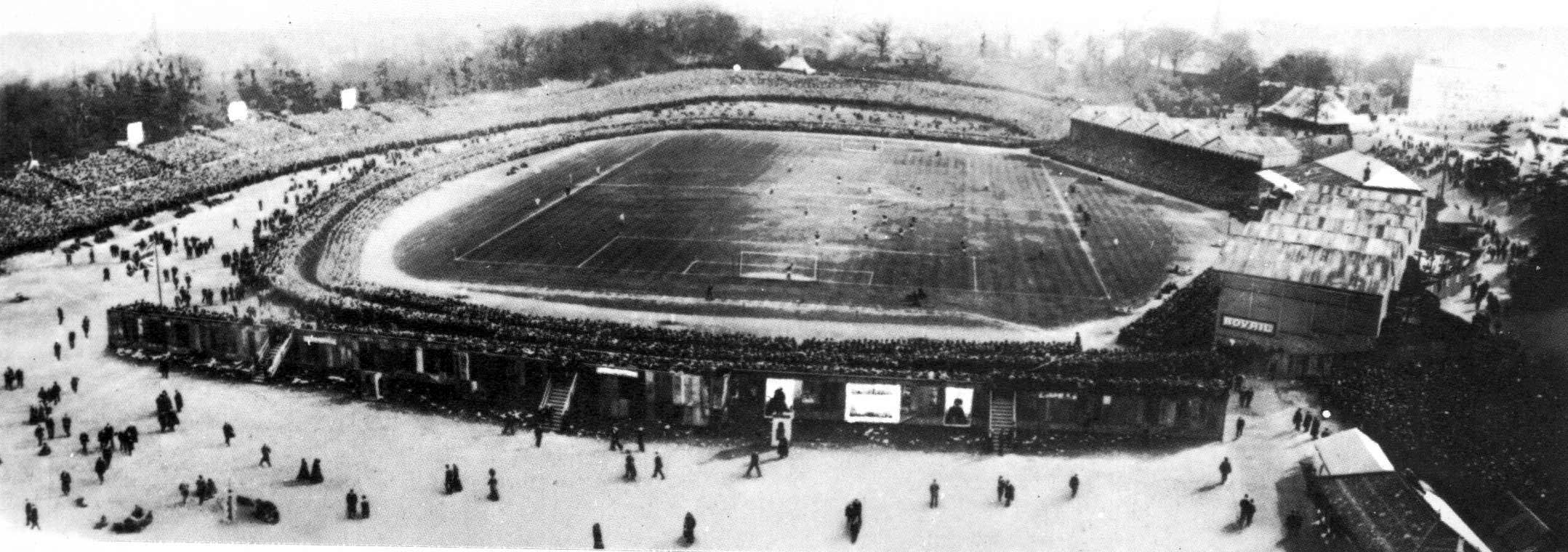
A panoramic view of the Crystal Palace ground during the 1905 FA Cup Final.

The final was played on 21 April 1900 at Crystal Palace in front of a crowd of 68,945, many of whom were "rooting" for the southerners; the referee was Arthur Kingscott from Derby, who had refereed the second-round match against Newcastle United. The weather was unusually sunny for April and Bury, who won the toss, decided to kick off with the sun behind them.

From the start, the Bury forwards directed several high crosses into the goalmouth to test the Saints' goalkeeper, Jack Robinson. The first goal came after nine minutes when Jack Plant's cross from the right was converted by centre-forward Jasper McLuckie. Bury were two goals up six minutes later when Willie Wood slotted home a loose clearance. Despite Robinson making "a couple of excellent saves", the match was over as a contest when McLuckie scored his second goal after 23 minutes, following a "fine pass" from Wood.

In the second half, the Saints came back into the game with Alf Milward and Harry Wood having several attempts on goal, to no avail. With ten minutes to play, Robinson made another fine save from Jack Pray, which resulted in a corner. The corner was quickly taken by Billy Richards to Plant, who shot "low and hard" past Robinson to complete a "football lesson" for the Southampton players.

=== Aftermath ===
Reporting on the match, the Southampton correspondent for Athletic News described the team's performance as "A weak, wavering, pitiable and lamentable show".

I can sadly say, and without doing any injustice to Bury, that from goalkeeper to centre-forward not a man in the Southampton side played up to his reputation.

All commentators agree that, while a defeat to a Football League side containing two current England players (Sagar and Plant) was excusable, the margin of defeat and the poor standard of performance were not.

Twelve years after the match, "Recorder" writing in the Southampton Pictorial attempted to uncover the reasons for Southampton's failure, for which there had "never been what one could call an official explanation". He claimed that there was a division between the English and Scottish players about who should play as centre-forward. The Scottish players wanted Roddy McLeod whereas the English majority wanted Jack Farrell. Farrell had returned in March from the injury sustained in the second-round match to replace McLeod for the semi-final. Farrell was a temperamental player who had once threatened a local reporter for criticizing his performance, whereas McLeod was a calmer, more selfless player.

"Recorder" claimed that:

This jealousy, while it disturbed the harmony that was so essential to success, did not develop into disloyalty ... but matters went badly for the team from the start, and some players, instead of making special efforts to save the game, attributed their non-success to the deliberate flouting of their wishes.

One unnamed player is reported to have said: "I could see that some of the others were not trying, and said to myself Why should I run myself to a standstill?"

Although Farrell and McLeod played out the last three league matches of the season, both players left the club in the summer as did defenders, Meechan, Durber and Petrie.

=== FA Cup results ===
| Date | Round | Opponents | H / A | Result F – A | Scorers | Attendance |
|---|---|---|---|---|---|---|
| 27 January 1900 | Round 1 | Everton | H | 3 – 0 | Milward (2), Turner | 10,000 |
| 17 February 1900 | Round 2 | Newcastle United | H | 4 – 1 | McLeod (2), Yates, Turner | 8,000 |
| 24 February 1900 | Round 3 | West Bromwich Albion | H | 2 – 1 | Turner, McLeod | 9,000 |
| 24 March 1900 | Semi-final | Millwall Athletic | N | 0 – 0 | | 30,000 |
| 28 March 1900 | Semi-final replay | Millwall Athletic | N | 3 – 0 | Milward (2), Yates | 10,000 |
| 21 April 1900 | Final | Bury | N | 0 – 4 | | 68,945 |

== Friendly matches ==
Despite the expanded league season and the long FA Cup run, Southampton continued to play regular friendly matches against other league clubs and amateur touring sides. Of the seventeen matches played, eight were wins, two drawn and seven defeats.

The first friendly match of the season was on 6 September 1899 at the opening of Portsmouth's Fratton Park stadium. Portsmouth played in pink shirts with maroon trimmings, earning them the nickname "the Shrimps", with Southampton in red and white stripes. The match was kicked off by the mayor of Portsmouth, with Portsmouth defending the Milton end of the ground. In an "entertaining spectacle", Portsmouth won 2–0 with goals from Dan Cunliffe (formerly with Liverpool) and Harold Clarke (formerly with Everton).

Saints entertained two teams from the Football League First Division, with Wolverhampton Wanderers winning 5–2 on 23 October and champions Aston Villa winning 4–2 on 3 January.

== Player statistics ==
| Position | Nationality | Name | League apps | League goals | FA Cup apps | FA Cup goals | Total apps | Total goals |
|---|---|---|---|---|---|---|---|---|
| FW | England | Sid Cavendish | 3 | 1 | 0 | 0 | 3 | 1 |
| HB | England | Arthur Chadwick | 24 | 1 | 6 | 0 | 30 | 1 |
| FB | Not known | Bill Crabbe ^{c} | 1 | 0 | 0 | 0 | 1 | 0 |
| FB | England | Peter Durber | 27 | 0 | 6 | 0 | 33 | 0 |
| HB | England | Frank Englefield | 1 | 0 | 0 | 0 | 1 | 0 |
| FW | England | Jack Farrell | 21 | 12 | 4 | 0 | 25 | 12 |
| HB | England | Joe French | 3 | 0 | 0 | 0 | 3 | 0 |
| FB | England | Ernest Gill | 1 | 0 | 0 | 0 | 1 | 0 |
| HB | Scotland | Don Greenlees | 8 | 0 | 0 | 0 | 8 | 0 |
| FB | England | Harry Haynes | 4 | 0 | 0 | 0 | 4 | 0 |
| GK | England | John Joyce | 7 | 0 | 0 | 0 | 7 | 0 |
| FW | Scotland | Watty Keay | 1 | 0 | 0 | 0 | 1 | 0 |
| FW | Scotland | Duncan McLean | 0 | 0 | 0 | 0 | 0 | 0 |
| FW | Scotland | Roddy McLeod | 17 | 6 | 2 | 3 | 19 | 9 |
| FB | Scotland | Peter Meechan | 21 | 1 | 6 | 0 | 27 | 1 |
| HB | Scotland | Samuel Meston | 27 | 3 | 6 | 0 | 33 | 3 |
| FW | England | Alf Milward | 28 | 24 | 6 | 4 | 34 | 28 |
| HB | England | Bert Paddington | 0 | 0 | 0 | 0 | 0 | 0 |
| HB | Scotland | Bob Petrie | 21 | 1 | 6 | 0 | 27 | 1 |
| GK | England | Jack Robinson | 21 | 0 | 6 | 0 | 27 | 0 |
| FW | England | Scott ^{d} | 1 | 0 | 0 | 0 | 1 | 0 |
| HB | England | Victor Smith | 2 | 0 | 0 | 0 | 2 | 0 |
| FW | England | Archie Turner | 20 | 7 | 6 | 3 | 26 | 10 |
| FW | England | Harry Wood | 24 | 6 | 6 | 0 | 30 | 6 |
| FW | England | Jimmy Yates | 25 | 8 | 6 | 2 | 31 | 10 |

=== Key ===
- GK — Goalkeeper
- FB — Full back
- HB — Half-back
- FW — Forward

== Transfers ==
=== In ===
| Date | Position | Name | From |
|---|---|---|---|
| May 1899 | FW | Jack Farrell | Stoke |
| Summer 1899 | HB | Joe French | Local football |
| 1899 | FB | Ernest Gill | Grimsby Town |
| May 1899 | HB | Don Greenlees | St Mirren |
| May 1899 | FW | Alf Milward | New Brighton Tower |
| September 1899 | HB | Bert Paddington | Eastleigh Athletic |
| May 1899 | FW | Archie Turner | St. Michael's, Camberley |

=== Departures ===
| Date | Position | Name | To |
|---|---|---|---|
| Summer 1899 | FW | Robert Buchanan | Sheppey United |
| Summer 1899 | HB | Geordie Dewar | Retired |
| June 1899 | FW | Walter Fairgrieve | Luton Town |
| July 1899 | FW | Abe Hartley | Woolwich Arsenal |
| Summer 1899 | FB | Tom Nicol | Retired |
| August 1899 | HB | John Robertson | Rangers |
| Summer 1899 | FW | George Seeley | New Brompton |
| Summer 1899 | FW | Tom Smith | Queens Park Rangers |
| Summer 1899 | FW | David Steven | Dundee |

== Notes ==
- ^a The writer in Chums had overlooked Woolwich Arsenal and Luton Town, who were members of the Football League Second Division.
- ^b The match against Swindon Town on 13 January 1900 was played at Reading's Elm Park as Swindon's ground was closed.
- ^c Bill Crabbe made his only appearance for Southampton away to Swindon Town on 13 January 1900. His performance at right-back was described as "plucky". Little else is known about him.
- ^d Scott was born in Surrey and was given a trial in the penultimate match of the season, at home to Millwall Athletic on 25 April 1900. Although he was known as the "Surrey flier", his performance on the right-wing was not enough to earn him another match.

== Bibliography ==
- Bull, David; Brunskell, Bob (2000). Match of the Millennium. Hagiology Publishing. ISBN 0-9534474-1-3.
- Chalk, Gary; Holley, Duncan (1987). Saints – A complete record. Breedon Books. ISBN 0-907969-22-4.
- Collett, Mike (2003). The Complete Record of the FA Cup. Sports Books. ISBN 1-899807-19-5.
- Gibbons, Philip (2001). Association Football in Victorian England – A History of the Game from 1863 to 1900. Upfront Publishing. ISBN 1-84426-035-6.
- Holley, Duncan; Chalk, Gary (1992). The Alphabet of the Saints. ACL & Polar Publishing. ISBN 0-9514862-3-3.
- Juson, Dave; Bull, David (2001). Full-Time at The Dell. Hagiology Publishing. ISBN 0-9534474-2-1.
- Juson, Dave (2004). Saints v Pompey - A history of unrelenting rivalry. Hagiology Publishing. ISBN 0-9534-4745-6.
- Lloyd, Guy; Holt, Nick (2005). The F.A. Cup – The Complete Story. Aurum Press. ISBN 1-8451-3054-5.
