= 1900–01 British Home Championship =

International football tournament

Tournament details
- Host country: England, Ireland, Scotland and Wales
- Dates: 23 February – 30 March 1901
- Teams: 4

Final positions
- Champions: England (10th title)
- Runners-up: Scotland

Tournament statistics
- Matches played: 6
- Goals scored: 27 (4.5 per match)
- Top scorer(s): (Scotland) Robert Hamilton (England) Steve Bloomer (5 goals)

The 1900–01 British Home Championship was an international football tournament between the British Home Nations. England won the competition with five points after strong victories over Wales and Ireland. Scotland too performed well, coming second with a win and two draws and racking up what remains their highest ever scoreline in an 11–0 demolition of the Irish in Glasgow.

Scotland's record win was the first match of the competition and saw hat-tricks by Sandy "Duke" McMahon and Robert Hamilton. In their second game however Scotland could not sustain their good form, resulting in a disappointing draw with a tough Welsh side who played well to gain their point. England entered the action next with a victory over the Irish, although the men in green limited the damage to just a three-goal deficit. England then took the lead in the competition with a heavy 6–0 win over Wales, Steve Bloomer scoring four. In the final matches, Ireland and Wales played for pride, neither side being able at this stage to win the trophy. Wales eventually won the match 1–0. England and Scotland however fought out a furious encounter as both sides stood a good chance of winning. However, by virtue of the Scottish draw with Wales, England needed only a draw to win the competition, a result they managed despite Scotland's resilience.

== Table ==
Team	Pld	W	D	L	GF	GA	GD	Pts
England (C)	3	2	1	0	11	2	+9	5
Scotland	3	1	2	0	14	3	+11	4
Wales	3	1	1	1	2	7	−5	3
Ireland	3	0	0	3	0	15	−15	0

Rules for classification: 1) points. The points system worked as follows: 2 points for a win and 1 point for a draw.
(C) Champions

== Results ==
23 February 1901

Scotland	11–0	Ireland
JW Campbell 10', 12'; Russell 20'; J Campbell 21'; McMahon 26', 70', 84'; Hamilton 50', 71', 85', 86'	Scottish FA

Celtic Park, Glasgow
Attendance: 15,000
Referee: Richard Thomas Gough (Wales)

2 March 1901

Wales	1–1	Scotland
Parry 76'		Robertson 74'

Racecourse Ground, Wrexham
Attendance: 5,000
Referee: Charles E. Sutcliffe (England)

9 March 1901

England	3–0	Ireland
Foster 83'; Crawshaw 9'; Hedley 81'

The Dell, Southampton
Attendance: 8,000
Referee: Tom Robertson (Scotland)

18 March 1901

England	6–0	Wales
Bloomer 38', 60', 71', 74'; Foster 72'; Needham 51' (pen.)

St James' Park, Newcastle
Attendance: 11,000
Referee: Tom Robertson (Scotland)

23 March 1901

Ireland	0–1	Wales
		Jones 55'

Solitude, Belfast
Attendance: 7,000
Referee: Charles E. Sutcliffe (England)

30 March 1901

England	2–2	Scotland
Blackburn 36'; Bloomer 80'	Scottish FA	Campbell 48'; Hamilton 75'

The Crystal Palace, London
Attendance: 18,520
Referee: James Torrans (Ireland)

== Winning squad ==
- England

Name	Apps/Goals by opponent			Total	
Name	(Wales) WAL	(Ireland) IRE	(Scotland) SCO	Apps	Goals
Tip Foster	1/1	1/1	1	3	2
Ernest Needham	1/1	1	1	3	1
William Oakley	1	1	1	3	0
Steve Bloomer	1/4		1/1	2	5
Walter Bennett	1		1	2	0
Albert Wilkes	1		1	2	0
Tommy Crawshaw		1/1		1	1
George Hedley		1/1		1	1
Fred Blackburn			1	1	0
Frank Forman			1	1	0
James Iremonger			1	1	0
Gilbert Smith			1	1	0
John Sutcliffe			1	1	0
William Bannister	1			1	0
William Beats	1			1	0
Bertie Corbett	1			1	0
Jimmy Crabtree	1			1	0
Matthew Kingsley	1			1	0
Herbert Banks		1		1	0
Jack Cox		1		1	0
Charles Fry		1		1	0
William Jones		1		1	0
Jack Robinson		1		1	0
Archie Turner		1		1	0
