= Bert Paddington =

English footballer (1881–1932)

Personal information
- Full name: Albert Hillman Paddington
- Date of birth: 30 June 1881
- Place of birth: Bishopstoke, England
- Date of death: 3 April 1932 (aged 50)
- Place of death: Porchester, England
- Height: 5 ft 5 in (1.65 m)
- Position: Half-back

Youth career
- 1895–1897: Bishopstoke
- 1897–1898: Chandler's Ford
- 1898–1900: Eastleigh Athletic

Senior career*
Years	Team	Apps	(Gls)
1900–1903	Southampton	12	(0)
1903–1904	Brighton & Hove Albion	31	(0)
1904–19??	Eastleigh Athletic		
- * Club domestic league appearances and goals

Albert Hillman Paddington (30 June 1881 – 3 April 1932) was an English professional footballer who played as a half-back for Southampton and Brighton & Hove Albion in the 1900s. During his career he was always known as "Paddy".

== Football career ==
Paddington was born at Bishopstoke, Hampshire and played for various local clubs, while working as a painter for London and South Western Railway at the Eastleigh Railway Works. He joined Southampton of the Southern League as an amateur in September 1900, aged 19, before turning professional the following May. He was one of the few local players who made the grade at this time in a side containing several England internationals and Scottish imports.

At the "Saints", Paddington spent most of his career in the reserves, where he was appointed captain soon after joining the club. He made his first-team debut when he took the place of Bertram Sharp at left-half for the game against Reading on 13 October 1900. He retained his place for the next match and made one further appearance in February, as Southampton went on to claim the Southern League title for the fourth time in five years.

In the following season, Paddington made his first League appearance for nearly a year when, on Saturday 1 February, he replaced Bert Lee, who had been injured three days earlier with a "nasty kick to the head" in the replay of the First Round FA Cup match against the cup holders, Tottenham Hotspur. Paddington retained his place for the second replay at Reading's Elm Park ground on Monday 3 February. In the first half, Paddington struggled against the pace of the Spurs' forwards, including John Cameron and Sandy Brown but, with the assistance of George Molyneux, survived a goalless first-half. In an impressive second-half, Paddington completely "shackled" Cameron and Brown and although Spurs scored first through Jack Kirwan, following a slip by C. B. Fry, the Saints ran out as victors with goals from Archie Turner and Albert Brown.

Paddington was in and out of the first-team for the rest of the season, making a further six league appearances as cover for Lee or Samuel Meston (at right-half), but was not selected again in the FA Cup as the Saints reached the cup final for the second time in three seasons. After making only three appearances in 1902–03, Paddington left the club in the 1903 close-season, and moved along the south coast to join Brighton & Hove Albion.

After one season in the Southern League with Brighton in which he made regular appearances in a season when Brighton struggled to avoid finishing at the bottom of the table, Paddington returned to Hampshire to re-join Eastleigh Athletic in September 1904.
