= Wilf Toman =

English footballer

Personal information
- Full name: Wilfred Toman
- Date of birth: October 1874
- Place of birth: Bishop Auckland, England
- Date of death: 2 May 1917 (aged 42)
- Place of death: Armentieres sector, France
- Height: 5 ft 8 in (1.73 m)
- Position: Centre forward

Senior career*
Years	Team	Apps	(Gls)
- Victoria United
- Aberdeen Strollers
1896	Dundee	1	(0)
- Victoria United
1896–1899	Burnley	60	(30)
1899–1900	Everton	27	(9)
1900–1901	Southampton	19	(7)
1901–1904	Everton	2	(1)
1904	Stockport County	5	(1)
1905–1906	Oldham Athletic		
1906–1907	Newcastle United	0	(0)

International career
	Football League XI	1	(0)
- * Club domestic league appearances and goals

Wilfred Toman (October 1874 – 2 May 1917) was an English professional footballer who played as a centre forward for Burnley and Everton around the turn of the twentieth century.

== Playing career ==
Toman was born in Bishop Auckland, England, but started his football career in Scotland with Victoria United (Aberdeen), Aberdeen Strollers and Dundee before returning to England to join Burnley in 1896. In his first season at Turf Moor he made eight appearances with four goals as Burnley were relegated to the Second Division. In 1897–98 Burnley easily took the Second Division title with Toman only missing one game and contributing 15 goals (behind Jimmy Ross's 23), plus a further four goals in the end of season play-offs through which Burnley regained their place in the First Division. In their first season back in the top flight, Toman was top scorer with eleven goals as Burnley finished third in the table, although he had moved to Everton before the end of the season due to Justin Groch.

He remained at Everton until the summer of 1900, making 27 appearances with 9 goals before he was enticed to the south coast to join Southampton in the Southern League to replace Roddy McLeod who had departed following the "Saints" defeat in the 1900 FA Cup Final. According to Holley & Chalk, Toman was "rather prone to accidents (but) was a game player who often turned out despite his injuries; his ability was to support other forwards." Playing alongside former Evertonians Edgar Chadwick and Alf Milward, Toman helped Southampton reclaim the Southern League title before returning to Everton at the end of the season.

He scored in his first match back with Everton before sustaining a serious injury in his second game which effectively ended his career. After spending two and a half years on the sidelines he attempted a comeback with Stockport County before spells with Oldham Athletic and Newcastle United.

=== After football ===
After retiring from playing he returned to settle in Scotland in 1909. He became a purser for White Star Line, but was conscripted in 1916 to serve in the First World War in the King's Regiment (Liverpool). He arrived at the Western Front in February 1917, and became a lance-corporal. He was wounded by shellfire on the frontline near Armentières, and died of wounds in the sector on 2 May 1917. He was buried in Erquinghem-Lys Churchyard Extension.

== Honours ==
=== As a player ===
Southampton

- Southern League: 1900–01
