= Pardington =

Pardington is a surname. Notable people with the surname include:

- A. R. Pardington (1862–1915), American engineer
- Fiona Pardington (born 1961), New Zealand photographer
- Jamie Pardington (born 2000), English footballer

== See also ==
- Paddington (disambiguation)
