= Wilf Waller =

South African soccer player (born 1877)

Personal information
- Full name: Wilfred Hugh Waller
- Date of birth: 27 July 1877
- Place of birth: South Africa
- Date of death: Unknown
- Height: 5 ft 11 in (1.80 m)
- Position: Goalkeeper

Senior career*
Years	Team	Apps	(Gls)
- Vampires
	Corinthian	0	(0)
1899	Richmond Association		
1899	Tottenham Hotspur	4	(0)
1899–1900	Bolton Wanderers	6	(0)
1900	Queens Park		
1900–1901	Southampton	2	(0)
- Watford
- Aylesbury United

International career
1899	FA XI		
- * Club domestic league appearances and goals

Wilfred Hugh Waller (born 27 July 1877) was a South African amateur football goalkeeper who played for various British clubs around the turn of the 20th century, including a period with Bolton Wanderers where he became the first South African player to appear in the Football League. He also played for Tottenham Hotspur, Southampton and Watford in the Southern League.

== Football career ==
Waller was born in South Africa and in 1899 was on a tour of England with a club from his home country. He remained in England and was invited on a tour of Germany as a member of a British "FA XI" which played four matches in five days at the end of November.

Waller had a brief spell with Tottenham Hotspur where he only played five games for Spurs. Four in the Southern League and one game in the United League. Waller then joined Bolton Wanderers of the Football League Second Division in 1900, thus becoming their first foreign player and the first player from South Africa to play in the Football League. Waller made one appearance for Bolton in the 1899–1900 season at the end of which they were promoted to the First Division.

In the following season, Waller made a further five league appearances for Bolton. Being an amateur player, he was also able to play for other clubs at the same time, and in the 1900–01 season he played for Queens Park in Scotland and twice for Southampton in the Southern League.

His first appearance for Southampton came in the opening match of the season as the "Saints" regular goalkeeper, the England international Jack Robinson, was serving a one-match suspension. In the match on 1 September 1900, Southampton defeated Luton Town 4–3 but Robinson returned for the following match. By December, when Robinson was again suspended, Harry Moger was now the second choice 'keeper, but Waller was invited to play in the return match against Luton Town at The Dell on 17 December. Southampton won the match 5–0 (with a hat-trick from Alf Milward) on their way to taking the Southern League title for the fourth year out of five.

After spells with Watford and Aylesbury United, Waller returned to South Africa with his family in April 1903.
