= David Lindsay (Scottish footballer) =

Scottish footballer

Personal information
- Position: Right winger

Senior career*
Years	Team	Apps	(Gls)
–	Rutherglen Glencairn		
1899–1905	St Mirren	96	(38)
1905–1906	Hearts	16	(3)
1906–1908	West Ham United	51	(4)
1908–1912	Leith Athletic	52	(10)
Total		215	(55)

International career
1903	Scotland	1	(0)
- * Club domestic league appearances and goals

David Lindsay was a Scottish footballer who played as a right winger.

== Career ==
Originally from Beith, Lindsay played club football for St Mirren, Hearts, West Ham United and Leith Athletic, and made one appearance for Scotland in 1903.

He missed a single game for West Ham United in 1906–07, his crosses from the right wing to players such as Harry Stapley, William Grassam and Lionel Watson contributing to the 60 goals scored by the club that season. In all, he made 2 FA Cup and 51 Southern Football League appearances for West Ham.
