= Owen Jones (footballer) =

Welsh footballer

Personal information
- Full name: John Owen Jones
- Date of birth: July 1871
- Place of birth: Bangor, Gwynedd, Wales
- Date of death: 23 September 1955 (age 84)
- Place of death: Crewe, England
- Position: Forward

Senior career*
Years	Team	Apps	(Gls)
?–1894	Bangor		
1894–1897	Crewe Alexandra	46	(17)
1897–1898	Chorley		
1898–1899	Newton Heath	2	(0)
1899–1901	Bangor		
1901	Earlestown		
1901–?	Stalybridge Rovers		

International career
1901	Wales	2	(1)
- * Club domestic league appearances and goals

John Owen Jones (July 1871 – 23 September 1955) was a Welsh footballer who played as a forward for several clubs in Wales and England, including Bangor City, Crewe Alexandra and Newton Heath.

== Career ==
=== Club career ===
Born in Bangor, Gwynedd, Jones began his football career with Bangor F.C., before joining Football League Second Division side Crewe Alexandra in October 1894. After three years with Crewe where he played in 54 matches and scored 21 goals, Jones transferred to Chorley, the 1896–97 Lancashire League champions, in September 1897. After Chorley could only manage a fifth-place finish in the Lancashire League in 1898, Jones signed for Newton Heath of the Football League Second Division.

Jones made his Newton Heath debut in the first fixture of the 1898–99 season, playing in the centre forward position in a 2–0 away win over Gainsborough Trinity on 3 September 1898. However, he only made one more appearance for the Heathens, a 5–1 away defeat to Burton Swifts on 1 October 1898, before being suspended by the club for "not obeying orders". By 1899, he had transferred back to Bangor, where he remained for the next two seasons, before transferring to Stalybridge Rovers, via a brief stint with Earlestown.

=== International career ===
During his second spell with Bangor, Jones received his first call-up to the Welsh national team. Selected in the Welsh squad for the 1901 British Home Championship, Jones made his Wales debut on 2 March 1901, playing at inside right in a 1–1 draw with Scotland in Wrexham. He was dropped for the following game against England on 18 March, to allow Pugh to move to inside right and Billy Meredith could take up his usual position at outside right.

Jones returned to the Wales team for the game against Ireland on 23 March at Pugh's expense, lining up alongside Meredith on the right side of the forward line. Jones ended up scoring the winning goal for Wales, as the match finished 1–0 to the away side. The result meant that Wales finished in third place in the 1901 Home Championship, ahead of Ireland.
