= John Joyce (footballer) =

English footballer (1877-1956)

Personal information
- Full name: John William Joyce
- Date of birth: 26 June 1877
- Place of birth: Burton upon Trent, England
- Date of death: June 1956 (aged 78–79)
- Place of death: Greenwich, England
- Height: 6 ft 0 in (1.83 m)
- Position: Goalkeeper

Youth career
- 1895–1896: Burton Pioneers

Senior career*
| Years | Team | Apps | (Gls) |
| 1896–1897 | Woodville | | |
| 1897–1898 | Overseal Town | | |
| 1898–1900 | Southampton | 7 | (0) |
| 1900–1901 | Millwall Athletic | | |
| 1901–1902 | Burton United | 0 | (0) |
| 1902–1903 | Blackburn Rovers | 14 | (0) |
| 1903 | Tottenham Hotspur | 0 | (0) |
| 1903–1909 | Millwall Athletic | | |
| 1909–1915 | Tottenham Hotspur | 73 | (1) |
| 1915–1919 | Millwall | | |
| 1919–1920 | Gillingham | 2 | (0) |
| 1920–1921 | Northfleet United | | |
- * Club domestic league appearances and goals

John William Joyce (26 June 1877 – June 1956) was an English footballer who played as a goalkeeper for various clubs between 1898 and 1920. Throughout his career, he was known to supporters as "Tiny" in allusion to his size, being 6 feet (1.8 m) tall and weighing over 14 stone (90 kg).

== Football career ==
Joyce was born in Burton upon Trent, Staffordshire and started his football career with his home-town club, Burton Pioneers, before spells with two clubs in neighbouring Derbyshire, Woodville and Overseal Town. Whilst playing for Overseal Town, he was spotted by scouts from Southern League champions Southampton, for whom he was signed for a fee of £80.

Joyce, together with his Overseal teammate, Sid Cavendish, joined the "Saints" in May 1898 and made his debut against Warmley in December 1898, but Warmley shortly afterwards withdrew from the league and their record was expunged. As a result, Joyce's "official" debut was delayed until 21 October 1899, in a 5–1 victory over Queens Park Rangers. At Southampton, Joyce was an understudy to England international Jack Robinson and Robinson's form meant that Joyce's first-team opportunities were rare. Nonetheless, he was a useful goalkeeper to have in reserve and was able to use his bulk to punt the ball upfield further than any other contemporary goalkeeper. After seven Southern League appearances, in May 1900 Joyce moved to fellow Southern League club Millwall Athletic in search of regular first team football.

After a season with Millwall, Joyce returned to his home-town to join the newly formed Burton United in the Football League Second Division in August 1901. After failing to break into the first-team at Burton, Joyce was transferred to Blackburn Rovers of the Football League First Division in May 1902. At Blackburn, he vied for the No.1 shirt with Willie McIver but after making 14 appearances he returned to London in the spring of 1903. After a brief spell with Tottenham Hotspur, he returned to Millwall in the summer where he was to remain for the next six years, before re-joining Spurs in 1909. In December 1905, he was briefly displaced as first-choice 'keeper by Jack Robinson, under whom he had played at Southampton.

At White Hart Lane, Joyce was initially first-choice 'keeper, before losing his place to Tommy Lunn but by 1912, he had ousted Lunn and taken over as the regular "custodian". On 10 April 1914, Joyce scored from a penalty against Bolton Wanderers and followed this with another against Bayern Munich in a friendly a month later. Joyce played a total of 113 first-team matches for the Spurs, with his career ending following the outbreak of World War I.

During the war, Joyce returned to Millwall and after the war, following a brief spell with Gillingham, became assistant trainer and was briefly caretaker manager when Bob Hunter became ill in the 1930s.

== Honours ==
Millwall Athletic

- Western League: 1907–08, 1908–09
- Southern Charity Cup: 1903–04
- London Challenge Cup: 1908–09
