= Paddington (disambiguation) =

Paddington is an area of the City of Westminster, London.

Paddington may also refer to:

== Places ==
- Metropolitan Borough of Paddington, a historic sub-division of the County of London
  - London Paddington station, a major railway station in London
  - Paddington tube station (Circle and Hammersmith & City lines), a London Underground station serving the mainline station
  - Paddington tube station (Bakerloo, Circle and District lines), a London Underground station serving the mainline station
  - Paddington Bridge or Bishop's Bridge, a road bridge in London
  - Paddington (UK Parliament constituency), a former constituency
- Paddington, New South Wales, a suburb of Sydney, Australia
  - Electoral district of Paddington (New South Wales)
- Paddington, Queensland, a suburb of Brisbane, Australia
  - Electoral district of Paddington (Queensland)
- Paddington, Western Australia, an abandoned Goldfields town, now called Gudarra
- Souk-el-Khemis Airfield, an abandoned airfield in Tunisia known by the codename "Paddington"
- Paddington, Cheshire, a settlement now part of the civil parish of Woolston within the township of Warrington

== Arts and entertainment ==
- Paddington Bear, a fictional character in children's literature
  - Paddington (TV series), the first TV series to feature Paddington Bear
  - Paddington Bear (TV series), a 1989 TV series
  - The Adventures of Paddington Bear, a 1997 TV series
  - The Adventures of Paddington (2019 TV series)
  - Paddington (film series)
    - Paddington (film), a 2014 film based on the fictional character Paddington Bear
    - Paddington 2, the 2017 sequel
    - Paddington in Peru, the 2024 third installment
  - Paddington: The Musical

== People ==
- Bert Paddington (1881–1932), English footballer with Southampton and Brighton & Hove Albion
- Paddington Mhondoro (1986–2015), Zimbabwean cricketer

== Other uses ==
- Paddington Gold Mine, a gold mine in Western Australia
- Paddington (horse), Thoroughbred racehorse

== See also ==
- 4:50 from Paddington, a novel by Agatha Christie
- Paddington Green (disambiguation)
