= Sid Cavendish =

English footballer (1876–1954)

Personal information
- Full name: Sidney William Cavendish
- Date of birth: 28 February 1876
- Place of birth: Burton-on-Trent, England
- Date of death: 20 July 1954 (aged 77)
- Place of death: Salisbury, England
- Position: Inside forward

Senior career*
Years	Team	Apps	(Gls)
18??–1898	Overseal Town		
1898–1902	Southampton	9	(2)
1902–1904	Freemantle		
1904–1906	Clapton Orient		
1906–19??	Salisbury City		
- * Club domestic league appearances and goals

Sidney William Cavendish (28 February 1876 – 20 July 1954) was an English professional footballer who played at inside-forward for various clubs around the turn of the 20th century.

== Football career ==
Cavendish was born in Burton-on-Trent and started his football career playing for nearby Overseal Town. In May 1898, he was spotted by a scout from Southern League champions, Southampton and he moved to the south coast, together with his teammate, goalkeeper John Joyce.

Cavendish spent his first season at The Dell in the reserves, scoring 22 goals. His first-team debut came on 6 January 1900, when he took the place of the former England international Harry Wood at inside-left for the visit of Gravesend United. The "Saints" celebrated the start of the new century in style, with Cavendish scoring in a memorable 8–0 victory. Cavendish played in the next two matches (at centre-forward and centre-half respectively), before returning to the reserves.

Described as "a gentlemanly player, often winning esteem and respect from many of his opponents", Cavendish made only one appearance in the 1900–01 season, followed by five appearances in 1901–02.

In the 1902 close-season, Cavendish dropped into the Hampshire League with Freemantle before moving in 1904 to the East End of London with Clapton Orient. After a year in the Southern League Second Division when they finished in eighth position, Clapton Orient applied for election to the Football League and were successful, taking their place in Football League Division Two. Cavendish made no Football League appearances for Orient, although he did make one appearance in the FA Cup.

=== Clapton Orient ===
Cavendish made 21 Southern League appearances in 1904–05 with 14 goals, and 19 appearances with 12 goals for the reserve side in the London League. He also made three appearances in the FA Cup, without scoring, including in Orient's very first match in the famous FA Cup competition, home to Enfield on 17 September 1904, a 4–1 victory. The following season, with Orient now in the Second Division of the Football League, he only played for the reserve side but did make one appearance in the FA Cup on 7 October 1905 at Felstead, a 1–-1 draw before 250 spectators.

In the summer of 1906, Cavendish moved to Salisbury, Wiltshire and joined Salisbury City, firstly as a player and later as a trainer, remaining with the City side into the late 1920s.
