= Arthur Blackburn (footballer) =

English footballer (1876–1938)

Personal information
- Full name: Arthur Blackburn
- Date of birth: 1876
- Place of birth: Billington, Lancashire, England
- Date of death: 1938 (aged 61–62)
- Place of death: Nelson, Lancashire
- Height: 5 ft 11 in (1.80 m)
- Position: Full-back

Youth career
- Mellor

Senior career*
Years	Team	Apps	(Gls)
1895–1898	Blackburn Rovers	0	(0)
1898–1899	Wellingborough		
1899–1900	Blackburn Rovers	2	(0)
1900–1901	Southampton	9	(0)
1901–1902	Blackburn Rovers	2	(0)
- * Club domestic league appearances and goals

Arthur Blackburn (1876–1938) was an English footballer who played as a full-back with Blackburn Rovers and Southampton around the turn of the 20th century. He was the elder brother of England international footballer, Fred Blackburn.

== Football career ==
Blackburn was born in the village of Billington, Lancashire and first joined his local club, Blackburn Rovers, in March 1895. After three years of reserve-team football, he spent the 1898–99 season with Northamptonshire club Wellingborough playing in the Midland League.

He returned to Blackburn in the summer of 1899; by now his brother Fred had become established at outside-left. Arthur once again spent most of his time at Ewood Park playing in Rovers' reserve team while keeping fit by voluntarily working on the renovation of a church, and only managed two first-team appearances in the 1899–1900 season.

In May 1900, Blackburn was persuaded to move to the south coast to join Southampton in the Southern League. Blackburn Rovers were reluctant to part company with him, but the financial inducements offered by Southampton persuaded him to try his luck in the south. Described as "strongly built", Blackburn "never gave less than 100%, but at time his play was too impetuous to be reliable". He made his "Saints" debut at right-back in the opening match of the 1900–01 season, a 4–3 victory at Luton Town and played in nine of the first ten games of the season until a serious ankle injury put him out of the side, with Bertram Sharp taking over.

Blackburn was unable to regain his place and in the summer of 1901 he returned to his home-town club where he made two further appearances in the 1901–02 season.

== Later career ==
Blackburn is known to have coached subsequently in Rotterdam in the Netherlands, before returning to Blackburn, where he ran a retail tobacconist shop.
