= 1902–03 Southampton F.C. season =

English football club season

Southampton F.C.
1902–03 season
- Stadium: The Dell
- Southern League: Winners (5th Title)
- Western League: 3rd
Home colours

The 1902–03 season was the 18th since the foundation of Southampton and their ninth in league football, as members of the Southern League, of which the club won their fifth title. They also competed in the Western League, where they finished in 3rd place.

== Squad ==
Player	Nat.	Pos	Source
George Molyneux	(England)	Full back	

== Competitions ==
=== Southern Football League Division One ===
==== Table ====
Pos	Team	Pld	W	D	L	GF	GA	GR	Pts
1	Southampton	30	20	8	2	83	20	4.150	48
2	Reading	30	19	7	4	72	30	2.400	45
3	Portsmouth	30	17	7	6	69	32	2.156	41
4	Tottenham Hotspur	30	14	7	9	47	31	1.516	35
5	Bristol Rovers	30	13	8	9	46	34	1.353	34

Source: rsssf.com
Rules for classification: The system of using goal average to separate two teams tied on points was used until the 1976-77 season. The points system: 2 points for a win, 1 point for a draw and 0 points for losing.

==== Results ====
26 December 1902 13	Southampton	0–1	Tottenham Hotspur	Southampton, Hampshire
				Stadium: The Dell

10 April 1903 25	Tottenham Hotspur	2–1	Southampton	Tottenham, London
				Stadium: White Hart Lane

=== Western League ===
==== Table ====
Pos	Team	Pld	W	D	L	GF	GA	GR	Pts	Result
1	Portsmouth	16	10	4	2	34	14	2.429	24	
2	Bristol Rovers	16	9	2	5	36	22	1.636	20	
3	Southampton	16	7	6	3	32	20	1.600	20	
4	Tottenham Hotspur	16	6	7	3	20	14	1.429	19	
5	Millwall Athletic	16	6	3	7	23	29	0.793	15	Left league at end of season
6	Reading	16	7	0	9	20	21	0.952	14	
7	Queens Park Rangers	16	6	2	8	18	31	0.581	14	
8	Brentford	16	3	4	9	16	34	0.471	10	
9	West Ham United	16	2	4	10	15	29	0.517	8	
