= Harry Hindle =

English footballer

Personal information
- Date of birth: 17 July 1883
- Place of birth: Ashton-under-Lyne, Lancashire, England
- Date of death: 1937 (aged 53–54)
- Place of death: Ashton-under-Lyne, Lancashire, England
- Positions: Centre-half; left-half

Senior career*
Years	Team	Apps	(Gls)
- St James' Road
- Oswaldtwistle Rovers
1901–1903	Blackburn Rovers	2	(0)
- Nelson
1905–1906	West Ham United	3	(0)
- Hurst
- * Club domestic league appearances and goals

Harold Hindle (17 July 1883 – 1937) was an English footballer who played as a centre-half or left-half in the Football League for Blackburn Rovers and in the Southern League for West Ham United.

Hindle made two League appearances for Blackburn Rovers before moving to Nelson of the Lancashire Combination. He then moved to West Ham United, along with Blackburn teammates Lionel Watson and Fred Blackburn, and played in the first two games of the 1905–06 season. He made one other appearance for West Ham, against Reading on 28 October 1905.

He later played for Hurst.
