= Tommy Lunn =

English footballer

Personal information
- Full name: Thomas Henry Lunn
- Date of birth: 9 July 1883
- Place of birth: Bishop Auckland, England
- Date of death: 1960 (aged 76–77)
- Height: 5 ft 8 1/2 in (1.74 m)
- Position: Goalkeeper

Youth career
- Brownhills Albion

Senior career*
| Years | Team | Apps | (Gls) |
| 1904–1909 | Wolverhampton Wanderers | 129 | |
| 1909–1912 | Tottenham Hotspur | 86 | |
| 1913 | Stockport County | 2 | |
- * Club domestic league appearances and goals

Thomas Henry Lunn (9 July 1883 – 1960) was an English professional footballer who played for Brownhills Albion, Wolverhampton Wanderers, Tottenham Hotspur, and Stockport County.

== Football career ==
Lunn began his career with Brownhills Albion before joining Wolverhampton Wanderers in 1904. The goalkeeper made 129 appearances for the Molineux club. Lunn collected a winners medal in the 1908 FA Cup Final.

In April 1910, he signed for Tottenham Hotspur where he featured in a further 91 matches in all competitions between 1910 and 1912. He played regularly over the next two seasons but was replaced by John "Tiny" Joyce in 1912. He played two more games in early 1913, but on taking out a publican's licence, he was suspended for breach of contract.

Lunn went on to play for Stockport County where he ended his playing career.

== Honours ==
Wolverhampton Wanderers

- 1908 FA Cup Final Winner
