= Paddington Green =

Paddington Green may refer to:

- Paddington Green, London, a location in north-east Westminster, London, United Kingdom
  - Paddington Green Children's Hospital, a former hospital in Paddington Green (1883–1987)
- Paddington Green Police Station, a police station in Paddington, London, United Kingdom
- Paddington Green (TV series), a UK television series based in Paddington, London, United Kingdom

== See also ==
- Paddington (disambiguation)
