= John Hodgkinson (footballer, born 1871) =

English footballer

Personal information
- Full name: John Hodgkinson
- Date of birth: 1871
- Place of birth: Tunstall, Staffordshire, England
- Date of death: 1944 (aged 72–73)
- Place of death: Stoke-on-Trent, Staffordshire, England
- Height: 5 ft 7 in (1.70 m)
- Position: Half-back

Senior career*
Years	Team	Apps	(Gls)
–	Tunstall		
1895–1897	Southampton	20	(3)
1897–1898	New Brompton	4	(0)
- * Club domestic league appearances and goals

John Hodgkinson (1871–1944) was an English professional footballer who played at half-back for Southampton and New Brompton in the 1890s.

== Football career ==
Hodgkinson was born in Tunstall, Staffordshire and was playing for his local side when he was spotted by a scout from Southern League Southampton.

After a successful trial, he moved to the south coast in December 1895 making his debut for the "Saints" when he took over from George Marshall against Chatham at the Antelope Ground on 18 January 1896. Hodgkinson retained his place for the rest of the season, making seven appearances, scoring twice (both in a 5–0 defeat of New Brompton on 28 March) with Southampton finishing in third place. Saints' trainer, Bill Dawson, nicknamed him "Ironside", as his short cropped hair and rolled-up sleeves gave him a tough image, which he maintained throughout his time with the Saints.

Hodgkinson retained his place for the start of the next season, as Saints went through the season undefeated. Hodgkinson and his fellow defenders only conceded 18 goals in 20 matches, as Southampton claimed the Southern League title for the first of six times over the next eight seasons. Hodgkinson missed the final five matches of the League season through injury, with local schoolmaster William Ponting replacing him. Hodgkinson was ever-present in the FA Cup where the Saints reached the Second Round proper, losing 3–1 to Newton Heath after a replay.

In the close-season, Southampton recruited the experienced Bob Petrie and Hodgkinson was released, joining fellow Southern League team, New Brompton.

== Honours ==
Southampton

- Southern League champions: 1896–97
