= Walter Triggs =

English footballer

Personal information
- Full name: Walter Henry Triggs
- Date of birth: January qtr. 1880
- Place of birth: Southampton, England
- Date of death: unknown (after 1902)
- Position: Full back

Senior career*
Years	Team	Apps	(Gls)
1897–1900	Freemantle		
1900–1902	Southampton	2	(0)
- * Club domestic league appearances and goals

Walter Henry Triggs (1880 – after 1902) was an English professional footballer who made two appearances for Southampton in the Southern League in 1902, playing at left-back.

== Football career ==
Triggs was born in Southampton and started his professional career with Freemantle before moving across the town to join Southampton F.C. in the summer of 1900. At The Dell he spent most of his career in the reserves, with George Molyneux holding down the regular first-team place at left-back.

Triggs finally made his first-team debut when Molyneux received his first call into the England squad for the 1902 British Home Championship match against Scotland. Triggs made his Saints' debut in a 2–1 defeat at Kettering Town on Wednesday 2 April 1902 and retained his place for the next match, on Saturday 5 April, a 2–1 victory at Wellingborough Town. Southampton finished the 1901–02 season third in the Southern League, although they still had to play in the 1902 FA Cup Final. In the meantime, Molyneux was playing in the Scotland vs. England international at Ibrox Park when a stand collapsed, killing 25 people in what became known as the Ibrox disaster.

Molyneux returned after the international to play in the cup final, which was lost to Sheffield United after a replay, whereas Triggs returned to the reserves and left the club and the area soon afterwards.
