= Bertram Sharp =

English footballer and club director (1876-1949)

Personal information
- Full name: Bertram Sharp
- Date of birth: 8 January 1876
- Place of birth: Hereford, England
- Date of death: 2 November 1949 (aged 73)
- Place of death: Liverpool, England
- Position: Full-back

Youth career
- Hereford Comrades
- Hereford Town
- Hereford Thistle

Senior career*
Years	Team	Apps	(Gls)
1897–1899	Aston Villa	22	(0)
1899–1900	Everton	3	(0)
1900–1901	Southampton	22	(1)
1901–1902	Everton	6	(0)
1904–1905	Kirkdale		
1902–1904	Southport Central		
- * Club domestic league appearances and goals

Bertram Sharp (8 January 1876 – 2 November 1949) was an English footballer who played as a full-back with Aston Villa, Everton and Southampton around the turn of the 20th century. He was the elder brother of England international footballer and test cricketer Jack Sharp. He later became a director of Everton Football Club.

== Football career ==
Sharp was born in Hereford and after playing his youth football with Hereford Comrades, played for Hereford Town and Hereford Thistle in the Birmingham & District League. From there, in June 1897 he joined Aston Villa who had won "the Double" in the previous season. He was joined at Villa Park by his brother, Jack.

During the opening month of the 1897–98 season, Sharp took over at full-back from Howard Spencer who had sustained a serious leg injury, causing him to miss the remainder of the season. Sharp made 19 appearances during the season, before losing his place to Tommy Bowman who had been signed from Blackpool. Villa finished the season in sixth place, a disappointment after the two previous Championship winning seasons.

For the following season, Spencer returned to the side and Sharp only made four further appearances as Villa once again took the league title.

In the summer of 1899, Sharp and his brother were both transferred to Everton. Sharp was used as cover for William Balmer and George Eccles, and made only three appearances in December 1899.

At the end of the season, Sharp moved to the south coast to join Southern League Southampton. At the "Saints", he gained a reputation as an honest, hardworking defender, who was "versatile and a good athlete". He made his debut playing at left-half in a 4–3 victory at Luton Town; after seven matches he switched to right-back, replacing Arthur Blackburn who was out with an ankle injury, with Bert Lee taking over at left-half at the start of an association with the Saints that would last until 1935. Sharp performed consistently during his one season at The Dell, at the end of which Southampton claimed the Southern League title for the fourth time in five years.

In December 1900, Southampton acquired the services of C. B. Fry, the celebrated amateur footballer – whenever Fry was available to play, Sharp was required to give way, thus missing several important games, including the FA Cup First Round defeat by Everton.

Sharp returned to Goodison Park in the summer of 1901, where he made a further six appearances towards the end of the season, before retiring from professional football.

In 1904, his amateur status was restored and he turned out for Kirkdale and then Southport Central of the Lancashire Combination.

== Career outside football ==
Sharp was also a good cricketer and in the summer of 1900 averaged over 40 for Herefordshire.

In 1904, he became the landlord of a public house situated opposite Goodison Park. He later joined the Everton board of directors, along with his brother.

== Honours ==
Southampton

- Southern League champions: 1900–01
