= Harry Haynes =

English footballer (1873–1902)

Personal information
- Full name: Harry Haynes
- Date of birth: 21 April 1873
- Place of birth: Walsall, England
- Date of death: 29 May 1902 (aged 29)
- Place of death: Southampton, England
- Positions: Wing half; full back

Senior career*
Years	Team	Apps	(Gls)
1891–1892	Walsall Unity		
1892–1893	Walsall Town Swifts	3	(0)
1893–1895	Wolverhampton Wanderers	24	(2)
1895–1896	Small Heath	9	(0)
1896–1900	Southampton	63	(4)
- * Club domestic league appearances and goals

Harry Haynes (21 April 1873 – 29 May 1902) was an English footballer who played as a full back for Walsall Town Swifts, Wolverhampton Wanderers, Small Heath and Southampton in the 1890s.

== Career ==
=== Midlands ===
Haynes was born in Walsall and after playing his club football with Walsall Unity, he joined Walsall Town Swifts making three appearances in the Football League Second Division in the 1892–93 season. In February 1893, he moved up to the First Division with Wolverhampton Wanderers.

After two seasons with Wolves, he joined Midlands rivals Small Heath in July 1895. He made ten appearances as one of several players tried at centre-half before Alex Leake came through from the reserve team to become the regular first choice in that position.

In the 1896 close season, Haynes was persuaded to leave the Midlands and move to the south coast to join Southern League Southampton St. Mary's, though Small Heath retained his Football League registration. He signed his contract with his new club on Birmingham New Street station with a pen borrowed from a booking office clerk.

=== Southampton ===
In his first season with the "Saints", he converted from a half back to play at left back; his pairing with Samuel Meston helped Southampton to claim their first Southern League title at the end of the 1896–97 season, with only 18 goals conceded from 20 matches. For the following season, Haynes linked up with Tom Nicol, with Meston moving to right half. Their defensive prowess helped Southampton to retain their Southern League title, again conceding only 18 goals (from 22 matches). The Saints also reached the 1898 FA Cup semi-final, where they were defeated by Nottingham Forest in rather controversial circumstances after goalkeeper George Clawley had his eyes "choked with snow" and conceded two goals in the final minutes of the game.

Haynes continued to appear regularly in the 1898–99 season, but was gradually moved forward, first to centre half, and finally onto the left wing, from where he scored twice at the end of the season to help the Saints claim the championship for the third consecutive season. In the 1899–1900 season, Haynes lost his place to Peter Durber and made only four appearances, before retiring at the end of the season.

In his four seasons with the Saints, Haynes made a total of 76 appearances, scoring five goals.

== After football ==
Haynes had already made plans for his life after football, taking over as landlord at the Turks Head pub in September 1898. After retiring from playing, he continued to act as a scout for Southampton – the most notable player introduced by him to the club was Joe French who spent two seasons at The Dell as a centre half before moving to New Brompton.

In May 1902, while behind the bar at the Edinburgh Castle pub, Haynes collapsed and died suddenly at the age of 29.

== Honours ==
Southampton

- Southern League championship: 1896–97, 1897–98, 1898–99
