= Don Greenlees =

Scottish footballer

Personal information
- Full name: Donald Greenlees
- Date of birth: 14 January 1875
- Place of birth: Bridgeton, Glasgow, Scotland
- Height: 5 ft 10 in (1.78 m)
- Position: Half-back

Senior career*
Years	Team	Apps	(Gls)
1896–1899	St Mirren	36	(1)
1899–1900	Southampton	8	(0)
1900–1907	St Mirren	145	(3)
1907–1908	Morton	30	(1)

International career
1904	Scottish League XI	1	(0)
- * Club domestic league appearances and goals

Donald Greenlees (born 14 January 1875) was a Scottish professional footballer who played as a half-back for St Mirren in Scotland and Southampton in England around the turn of the 20th century.

== Football career ==
Born in Bridgeton, Glasgow, Greenlees started his professional career with nearby St Mirren where he gained a reputation as "one of the best half-backs in Scotland".

In May 1899, Greenlees moved to southern England to join Southern League champions Southampton. He made his debut for the Saints at The Dell, taking the place of Samuel Meston at right-half for a 5–1 victory over Queens Park Rangers on 21 October 1899. Greenlees was never able to command a regular place in the Southampton line-up and was used as an understudy for fellow Scots Meston, Peter Meehan and Bob Petrie, making a total of eight appearances.

After one season on the south coast, Greenlees rejoined St Mirren F.C.|St Mirren in the 1900 close-season, resuming what became a long-running half-back partnership with Michael McAvoy and Walter Bruce (the latter gradually replaced by Robert Robertson). By the time of his departure in 1907, Greenlees had made well over 200 appearances for the Paisley club in the major competitions; he then had a short spell with regional rivals Morton. He returned to Southampton in 1908 and settled in the Shirley Warren area of the town.

Greenlees represented the Scottish League once, in 1904.
