= Victor Smith (footballer, born 1878) =

English footballer

Personal information
- Full name: Eugene Victor Charles Smith
- Date of birth: 1878
- Place of birth: Southampton, England
- Date of death: 29 December 1951 (aged 73)
- Position: Half-back

Senior career*
| Years | Team | Apps | (Gls) |
- Bitterne
| 1896–1903 | Southampton St. Mary's | 5 | (0) |
- * Club domestic league appearances and goals

Eugene Victor Charles Smith (1878 – 29 December 1951) was an English amateur footballer who played as a half-back for Southampton St. Mary's in the late 1890s/early 1900s.

== Football career ==
Smith was born in Southampton and was employed in the town's Ordnance Survey headquarters. He made his first appearance for Southampton St. Mary's on 28 March 1896, when he took the place of Alf Littlehales in a 5–0 victory over New Brompton.

He spent most of his time with "the Saints" in the reserves, where he became team captain. It was not until January 1900 that he made his next Southern League appearance when he was called up in place of Jimmy Yates away to Swindon Town. He made a further appearance in the penultimate match of the season, before another long spell in the reserves.

Noted for "the prodigious distance he was able to kick the ball", he was able to dispatch it the full length of the pitch. His final league appearances came in January 1902, when he took over from Tommy Bowman for two matches. He played on in the reserves for another season before retiring.

== Life outside football ==
In 1903, he became a full-time police officer and remained in the police force for 28 years, reaching the rank of Sergeant.

He remained a keen supporter of "the Saints" throughout his life, rarely missing a home match. He died on 29 December 1951 on his way home after a match (a 4–1 defeat by Sheffield Wednesday).
