= Ernest Gill =

English footballer and cricketer

Personal information
- Full name: Ernest Harry Gill
- Date of birth: 24 August 1877
- Place of birth: Mountsorrel, England
- Date of death: 1 June 1950 (aged 72)
- Place of death: Drypool, England
- Height: 5 ft 9 in (1.75 m)
- Position: Full-back

Youth career
- Poole White Star
- Bridgwater Town

Senior career*
Years	Team	Apps	(Gls)
- Bristol City
- Grimsby Town
1899–1900	Southampton	1	(0)
1900–1901	Freemantle		
1901–1902	Leicester Fosse	1	(0)
- Melton Amateurs
- Excelsior Thursday
- Cricket career
Cricket information
- Batting: Right-handed
- Bowling: Right-arm fast-medium
Domestic team information
- Years: Team
- 1901: Leicestershire
Career statistics
Competition	First-class
Matches	5
Runs scored	23
Batting average	11.50
100s/50s	0/0
Top score	11*
Balls bowled	831
Wickets	12
Bowling average	34.41
5 wickets in innings	0
10 wickets in match	0
Best bowling	3/61
Catches/stumpings	3/–
- Source: CricInfo, 16 August 2009
- * Club domestic league appearances and goals

Ernest Harry Gill (24 August 1877 – 1 June 1950) was an English amateur footballer who made single appearances at right-back for Southampton in 1900 and for Leicester Fosse in 1901. He also made five appearances for Leicestershire County Cricket Club in 1901.

== Football career ==
Gill was born in Mountsorrel, Leicestershire before moving to South West England where he played as an amateur for White Star (Poole), Bridgwater Town and Bristol City (without making any first-team appearances). His performances earned him a call-up to represent the Somerset County Football Association.

After playing for Grimsby Town reserves, he was offered a trial by Southern League champions, Southampton. He made his solitary appearance for the "Saints" on 17 March 1900, when he took the place of Peter Meechan at right-back against Sheppey United. Although the match was won 5–0 (with two goals each from former England internationals Alf Milward and Harry Wood), Gill had a poor game. Nonetheless, the Southampton board offered him a position with the club, which Gill decided to decline.

He subsequently turned out for local rivals, Freemantle, before moving back to his home county in 1901. He then signed for Leicester Fosse of the Football League Second Division, making one appearance at left-back, replacing George Swift.

== Cricket career ==
During the summer of 1901, Gill made five appearances for Leicestershire, in which he scored a total of 23 runs and took 12 wickets, at averages of 11.50 and 34.41 respectively.

== Family ==
His brother, George Gill also played cricket for Leicestershire, as well as for London County and Somerset.
