= Ted Killean =

English footballer (1874–1937)

Personal information
- Full name: Edward Killean
- Date of birth: 1874
- Place of birth: Great Harwood, England
- Date of death: 1937 (aged 62–63)
- Place of death: Fylde, England
- Height: 5 ft 10 in (1.78 m)
- Position: Half back

Youth career
- 3rd Coldstream Guards

Senior career*
Years	Team	Apps	(Gls)
1894–1898	Blackburn Rovers	88	(6)
1898–1900	Glossop North End	54	(4)
1900–1901	Southampton	2	(0)
1901–1903	New Brompton	33	(0)
1903–1904	Blackpool	5	(0)
- * Club domestic league appearances and goals

Edward Killean (1874–1937) was an English professional footballer who played as a half back around the turn of the 20th century, spending the largest part of his career with Blackburn Rovers.

== Football career ==
Killean was born in Great Harwood, Lancashire and after serving with the 3rd Coldstream Guards joined his home-town club, Blackburn Rovers, in August 1894 going on to make over 100 appearances in all competitions.

In the 1894–95 season he was often played as an inside-forward and in January 1895, he and England international Henry Chippendale both scored hat-tricks in a 9–1 victory over Small Heath. By the end of the following season, Killean had become established at left-half taking over from Thomas Cleghorn who had moved on to join Liverpool.

Over the next two seasons, Killean rarely missed a league match for Blackburn who struggled near the foot of the First Division table, including having to go through the play-offs at the end of the 1897–98 season. Although Rovers came last in the play-off table, they retained their place in the top flight as the First Division was expanded to 18 clubs.

By November 1898, Peter Chambers had taken over at left-half and Killean was transferred to Glossop North End who had just been elected to the expanded Second Division. Killean was an ever-present for the rest of the 1898–99 season, at the end of which Glossop finished as runners-up and were thus promoted to the First Division. Glossop struggled in their only season in the top-flight, finishing at the foot of the table nine points behind second-last club Burnley and returned to the Second Division.

In the summer of 1900, Killean moved to the south coast to join Southampton of the Southern League as cover for England international Arthur Chadwick. Described as "a sturdy, diligent reserve" he made his debut for the "Saints" playing at centre-half in a 3–1 FA Cup defeat by Everton on 9 February 1901. In March, he made two league appearances when Chadwick was injured, and although these resulted in a 5–1 defeat of Queens Park Rangers and a 1–1 draw at Bristol City, Killean lost his place once Chadwick was fit. In his two league appearances, Killean "distributed the ball with precision" but was too slow to hold on to his place in a very strong Southampton side, who ended the season as Southern League champions for the fourth time in five years.

Killean then moved to fellow Southern League side New Brompton where he was a first-team regular for two seasons before returning to the Football League with Blackpool in December 1903, retiring the following summer.

== Personal life ==
In May 1899, Killean appeared at Blackburn County Police Courts on a charge of breach of the peace for fighting with a man called Robert Horne in Whalley Road, Wilpshire, Blackburn. He was bound over in the sum of £5 and one surety of the same amount to keep the peace for six months. The Court records showed his address at the time as 9 Taylor Street, Blackburn.

== Honours ==
Glossop North End

- Football League Second Division runners-up: 1898–99
