= Billy Bannister =

English footballer (1879–1942)

Personal information
- Full name: William Bannister
- Date of birth: 26 December 1878
- Place of birth: Burnley, England
- Date of death: 25 March 1942 (aged 63)
- Place of death: Leicester, England
- Position: Defender

Senior career*
Years	Team	Apps	(Gls)
1899–1901	Burnley	50	(3)
1901–1903	Bolton Wanderers	28	(3)
1903–1904	Woolwich Arsenal	18	(0)
1904–1910	Leicester Fosse	149	(15)
1910–1912	Burnley	5	(1)
Total		240	(22)

International career
1901–1902	England	2	(0)
- * Club domestic league appearances and goals

William Bannister (26 December 1878 – 25 March 1942) was an English professional footballer who played as a defender for Burnley, Bolton Wanderers, Woolwich Arsenal and Leicester Fosse. Bannister also played at international level, earning two caps with the England national side between 1901 and 1902.

== Biography ==
William Bannister was born in Burnley, Lancashire on 26 December 1878. As a teenager, he worked as a coal miner at the Barden Colliery before moving into professional football. After his football career ended, Bannister resided in Leicester and owned a public house in the city. He died on 25 March 1942, at the age of 63.

== International career ==
Following his performances for Burnley, Bannister was called up to the England national football team in 1901. He made his international debut on 18 March 1901 in the 6–0 victory over Wales at St James' Park. Bannister was again selected for the national side the following year, while playing for Bolton. His second and final international cap came against Ireland on 22 March 1902.
