= Henry Small (footballer) =

English footballer

Personal information
- Full name: Henry John Small
- Date of birth: c. 1881
- Place of birth: Southampton, England
- Date of death: 5 June 1946 (aged 64–65)
- Place of death: Southampton, England
- Position: Inside forward

Senior career*
Years	Team	Apps	(Gls)
- Freemantle
1900–1902	Southampton	4	(0)
1902–1905	Manchester United	0	(0)
1905–19??	Salisbury City		
- * Club domestic league appearances and goals

Henry John Small (c. 1881 – 5 June 1946) was an English footballer who played as an inside forward for Southampton and Manchester United in the 1900s.

== Football career ==
Small was born in Southampton and started his football career with Freemantle before moving across the town to join Southampton in 1900 as an amateur player.

Known to his colleagues as "Ranji", Small spent most of his time at Southampton in the reserves, playing in the Western League. His first-team debut came on 1 March 1902, when he took the place of Edgar Chadwick at inside-left, with Chadwick moving to inside-right to replace the injured Harry Wood, for the Southern League match at Millwall. The match was drawn 1–1 and Small retained his place for the next two matches, before Wood returned in time for the FA Cup semi-final against Nottingham Forest on 15 March. Although Small made one further appearance, he was always an understudy to Chadwick and Wood, both former England internationals and decided to try his luck elsewhere in the summer of 1902.

He moved to Lancashire to join Manchester United, still as an amateur, before signing a professional contract in May 1904. He failed to break into the first team and in the 1905 close season he returned south to play for Salisbury City in the Western League.
