= Fred Blackburn (footballer) =

English footballer (1878–1951)

Personal information
- Full name: James Thomas Alfred Blackburn
- Date of birth: 20 July 1878
- Place of birth: Blackburn, Lancashire, England
- Date of death: 13 March 1951 (aged 72)
- Place of death: Ilford, England
- Positions: Outside left; wing-half

Senior career*
Years	Team	Apps	(Gls)
- Mellor
1897–1905	Blackburn Rovers	192	(25)
1905–1913	West Ham United	217	(24)

International career
1901–1904	England	3	(1)
- * Club domestic league appearances and goals

James Thomas Alfred Blackburn (20 July 1878 – 13 March 1951), known as Fred Blackburn, was an English footballer who played in the Football League for Blackburn Rovers and in the Southern League for West Ham United.

Blackburn played for his home-town club of Blackburn Rovers, playing as an outside-left, and featured for the team at the age of 17.

He was capped three times for England, making his international debut at Crystal Palace against Scotland, in which he scored in a 2–2 draw. He also represented the English League against the Scottish League and played in a North versus South fixture.

He moved to West Ham United in the summer of 1905, along with Blackburn teammates Lionel Watson and Harry Hindle, and switched to wing-half while with the club. He was an ever-present during the 1909–10 season and totalled 237 Southern League appearances for the club, scoring 24 goals, before leaving in 1913.

After retiring from the game, Blackburn joined the Merchant Navy, but later returned to football to coach Barking.

His brother Arthur made a handful of appearances for Blackburn Rovers and for Southampton as a full-back.
