= Jack Robinson (footballer, born 1870) =

English footballer (1870–1931)

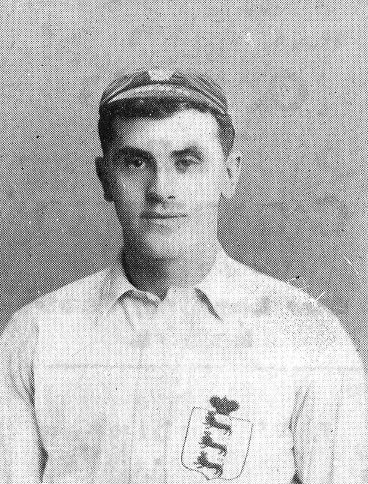
- Robinson pictured whilst with the England national team

Personal information
- Full name: John William Robinson
- Date of birth: 22 April 1870
- Place of birth: Derby, England
- Date of death: 28 October 1931 (aged 61)
- Place of death: Derby, England
- Height: 5 ft 11 in (1.80 m)
- Position: Goalkeeper

Senior career*
Years	Team	Apps	(Gls)
1886	Derby St Neots		
1887	Derby Midland		
1888–1891	Lincoln City		
1891–1897	Derby County	163	(0)
1897–1898	New Brighton Tower		
1898–1903	Southampton	116	(0)
1903–1905	Plymouth Argyle	50	(0)
1905	Exeter City		
1905–1907	Millwall		
1907	Green Waves		
1908–1909	Exeter City		
1909–1912	Stoke	55	(0)
1912	Rochester City		
Total		384+	(0)

International career
1897–1901	England	11	(0)
- * Club domestic league appearances and goals

John William Robinson (22 April 1870 – 28 October 1931) was a professional footballer who played for, among others, Derby County, Southampton and England.

== Football career ==
Robinson was born in Derby and began playing football for local sides Derby St Neots and Derby Midland before moving to Lincoln City in 1888. After helping the Imps win the Midland Football League in 1890 he returned to his hometown and signed for Football League side Derby County. Robinson spent six seasons at Derby, making over 180 appearances, and was a key player in their 1895–96 campaign which saw them finish as runner-up to Aston Villa. He left Derby in 1897 and spent a season with New Brighton Tower before joining South Coast club Southampton.

He enjoyed a successful time with Southampton helping them to dominate the Southern League at the turn of the 20th century. As goalkeeper, Robinson was instrumental in a string of victories over top-flight sides in the F A Cup during this period, especially in getting to the 1900 FA Cup final where infighting over the selection of an out of form English forward over the in-form Roddy McLeod of Scotland led to fighting between the English and Scottish factions and ultimately led to a very disjointed team performance and a heavy defeat.

Robinson was noted, during his playing career, for his reliability and was, according to author Francis Hodgson, among the first goalkeepers to dive full length to make saves. Touring eastern Europe with Southampton, Robinson played a notable role in introducing modern goalkeeping techniques to Austria and Hungary. In Prague, Southampton beat local Slavia 3–0 and Robinson's novel goalkeeping style of diving saves gave rise to the Czech term, "robinsonáda". Gyula Grosics, the Hungarian international of the 1950s, observed that "it was Moon of the Corinthians, Robinson, and many other world-famous England goalkeepers who have been the pioneers of this art, and they showed the way for all Europe's goalkeepers." Hugo Meisl, the noted coach of the Austrian "Wunderteam" of the 1930s, went further, recalling:

"In that year (1899)^{a} the first English professionals came over, Southampton F.C. They beat the Viennese city eleven 6–0 and their goalkeeper, Robinson, showed for the first time how to tackle low shots by flying through the air with the greatest of ease. Until this day (1930) that type of save is called a 'Robinsonade' in Austria and Central Europe. After the match, Robinson gave an exhibition. His goal was bombarded simultaneously with six balls and he blocked most of the shots."

Robinson left Southampton in 1903 and went on to play for fellow Southern League clubs Plymouth Argyle, Exeter City, Millwall and Stoke.

== Professional baseball ==
In 1890 Robinson played professional baseball for Derby Baseball Club in the National League of Baseball of Great Britain. Robinson played alongside Steve Bloomer and helped them become British champions twice in the 1890s.

== Career statistics ==
=== Club ===
Appearances and goals by club, season and competition
Club	Season	League			FA Cup		Other		Total	
Club	Season	Division	Apps	Goals	Apps	Goals	Apps	Goals	Apps	Goals
Derby County	1891–92	The Football League	25	0	1	0	0	0	26	0
Derby County	1892–93	First Division	30	0	3	0	0	0	33	0
Derby County	1893–94	First Division	25	0	4	0	0	0	29	0
Derby County	1894–95	First Division	23	0	1	0	1 (Note: Appearance in Football League test matches)	0	25	0
Derby County	1895–96	First Division	30	0	5	0	0	0	35	0
Derby County	1896–97	First Division	30	0	4	0	0	0	34	0
Derby County	Total		163	0	18	0	1	0	182	0
Southampton	1898–99	Southern League	24	0	3	0	0	0	27	0
Southampton	1899–1900	Southern League	21	0	6	0	0	0	27	0
Southampton	1900–01	Southern League	22	0	1	0	0	0	22	0
Southampton	1901–02	Southern League	26	0	8	0	0	0	28	0
Southampton	1902–03	Southern League	23	0	0	0	0	0	23	0
Southampton	Total		116	0	26	0	0	0	142	0
Plymouth Argyle	1903–04	Southern League	40	0	7	0	0	0	47	0
Plymouth Argyle	1904–05	Southern League	10	0	0	0	0	0	10	0
Plymouth Argyle	Total		50	0	7	0	0	0	57	0
Stoke	1909–10	Birmingham & District League / Southern League Division Two	27	0	6	0	2 (Note: Appearances in Birmingham League Cup)	0	35	0
Stoke	1910–11	Birmingham & District League / Southern League Division Two	28	0	3	0	0	0	31	0
Stoke	Total		55	0	9	0	2	0	66	0
Career total			384	0	34	0	3	0	440	0

=== International ===
National team	Year	Apps	Goals
England
England	1897	2	0
England	1898	3	0
England	1899	2	0
England	1900	3	0
England	1901	1	0
Total		11	0

== Honours ==
=== Footballer ===
Derby County

- Football League First Division runners-up: 1895–96

Southampton

- FA Cup finalists: 1900, 1902
- Southern League champions: 1898–99, 1900–01, 1902–03

England

- British champions: 1898, 1899, 1901, 1903 (shared)

=== Baseball player ===
Derby County

- British Champions: 1895, 1897

== Footnotes ==
- ^a According to the Southampton F.C. histories, the club's first tour of Europe was in April 1901. Among their opponents on that tour were Vienna Cricket & Football Club, who were defeated 7–0 and a Vienna Combined XI who were defeated 8–0.

== Bibliography ==
- Chalk, Gary; Holley, Duncan (1987). Saints – A complete record. Breedon Books. ISBN 0-907969-22-4.
- Chalk, Gary; Holley, Duncan; Bull, David (2013). All the Saints: A Complete Players' Who's Who of Southampton FC. Southampton: Hagiology Publishing. ISBN 978-0-9926-8640-6.
- Hodgson, Francis (1998). Only the Goalkeeper To Beat. Macmillan. ISBN 0-333-68693-4.
- Holley, Duncan (2012). Suited and Booted. Bristol: Hagiology Publishing. ISBN 978-0-9534474-9-7.
- Holley, Duncan; Chalk, Gary (1992). The Alphabet of the Saints. ACL & Polar Publishing. ISBN 0-9514862-3-3.
