= Frank Englefield =

English footballer

Frank George Englefield
Personal information
- Date of birth: Aug 1876
- Place of birth: Southampton, England
- Date of death: February 1945 (aged 68)
- Place of death: Bournemouth, England
- Position: Outside left

Youth career
- Freemantle Mission

Senior career*
Years	Team	Apps	(Gls)
1897–1898	Freemantle		
1898–1900	Southampton	1	(0)
1900–1901	Fulham	12	(0)
1902–1904	Southampton Wanderers		
1904–?	Freemantle		
- * Club domestic league appearances and goals

Frank Englefield (August 1878 – 1945) was an English professional footballer who played for Southampton in the late 1890s, generally at outside-left although his only Southern League appearance came at left-half.

== Football career ==
Englefield was born in Southampton and played his youth football for the Freemantle Mission before joining the Freemantle club.

In May 1898, he moved across the town to join Southampton who had just been crowned as Southern League champions for the second successive year. He initially played in the reserves, including two appearances in the United League, which led to him being selected to play for the Hampshire County F.A. against Dorset in March 1899.

His only appearance in the first-team came on 25 November 1899, when he was selected to replace Bob Petrie at left-half for the match at Bedminster. Englefield failed to make any impression in the match, which was won 2–0, and, with England international Alf Milward becoming the established left-winger, Englefield returned to the reserves.

In the 1900 close season, Englefield left Southampton and joined Fulham for one season before returning to Freemantle, where he stayed for two years before playing out his career with Southampton Wanderers.

== Family ==
Englefield's sister, Beatrice, was married in 1908 to Phil Mead, the Hampshire and England cricketer, who also played football for Southampton, making one first-team appearance as an emergency goalkeeper in December 1907.
