= Lionel Watson =

English footballer

Personal information
- Date of birth: 1881
- Place of birth: Southport, Lancashire, England
- Date of death: 1945 (aged 63–64)
- Place of death: Blackpool, Lancashire, England
- Position: Forward

Senior career*
Years	Team	Apps	(Gls)
- Laurel Rovers
- High Park
- Southport Central
1901–1902	Manchester City	1	(0)
1902–1905	Blackburn Rovers	55	(18)
1905–1908	West Ham United	76	(26)
1908–1909	Blackpool	1	(0)
- * Club domestic league appearances and goals

Lionel Watson (1881 – 1945) was an English footballer who played as an inside-forward or centre-forward in the Football League, primarily for Blackburn Rovers. He also played for Manchester City and Blackpool and spent three seasons with Southern League club West Ham United.

Watson was born Southport and began his career with Southport Central. He spent a season as a reserve team player for Manchester City and retained his amateur status. He made his only League appearance in a 5–0 defeat to Sheffield United in November 1901.

Watson signed as professional with Blackburn Rovers, where he scored 18 goals in 55 appearances during a three-year spell.

Watson then dropped down to the Southern League Division One to play for West Ham United. The Irons had signed Watson along with Blackburn teammates Harry Hindle and Fred Blackburn and he made his debut on the opening day of the 1905–06 season, against Swindon Town.

He played his final game for West Ham on 17 April 1908, against New Brompton, and left the club with 80 appearances and 27 goals to his name.

After leaving Upton Park, Watson returned to Lancashire and joined Blackpool, where he made a single appearance in 1908–09. After retirement from football, he continued to live in Blackpool and worked as an auctioneer.
