= Robert Hunter (footballer) =

English footballer

Personal information
- Full name: Robert Hunter
- Date of birth: 1883
- Place of birth: Silpho, England
- Date of death: 1962 (aged 78–79)
- Position: Winger

Senior career*
Years	Team	Apps	(Gls)
1903–1904	Filey		
1904–1905	Grimsby Town	8	(1)
- * Club domestic league appearances and goals

Robert Hunter (1883–1962) was an English professional footballer who played as a winger.
