= Archie Turner (footballer) =

English footballer (1877–1925)

Personal information
- Full name: Arthur Turner
- Date of birth: June 1877
- Place of birth: Hartley Wintney, England
- Date of death: 4 April 1925 (aged 47)
- Place of death: Farnborough, England
- Height: 5 ft 8 in (1.73 m)
- Position: Outside right

Youth career
- 1892–1894: Aldershot North End
- 1894–1898: South Farnborough
- 1898–1899: St. Michael's, Camberley

Senior career*
Years	Team	Apps	(Gls)
1899–1902	Southampton	65	(23)
1902–1903	Derby County	21	(1)
1903–1904	Newcastle United	13	(1)
1904	Tottenham Hotspur	6	(5)
1904–1905	Southampton	13	(1)
1905–1914(?)	South Farnborough Athletic		

International career
1900–1901	England	2	(0)
- * Club domestic league appearances and goals

Arthur "Archie" Turner (June 1877 – 4 April 1925) was a professional footballer who played at outside-right in the 1900 and 1902 FA Cup Finals for Southampton, and made two appearances for England.

== Playing career ==
Archie Turner was born in Hartley Wintney and began his professional career with Aldershot North End, before playing for South Farnborough and St. Michael's, Camberley. He had trials with Brentford and Reading before he was snapped up in May 1899 by Southampton who had just claimed the Southern League championship for the third consecutive year.

In his first season at The Dell, Saints only managed third place in the league, but reached the FA cup final for the first time in their history. Unfortunately for Turner, the Cup Final was a great disappointment as Saints were swept aside 4–0 by Bury. Turner was the only Hampshire born player to appear in Saints FA Cup final team. He also achieved the then unique distinction of being called up for England in his first season in first-class football against Ireland, also becoming the first Hampshire-born player to represent England.

His rapid rise to prominence made him a target for opposing full-backs and he received some rough treatment. Despite this, he continued to produce exciting wing play down the right-hand side. According to Holley & Chalk's The Alphabet of the Saints, "he was a master of delivering accurate centres; if he had a fault it was a reluctance to shoot, preferring instead to find a colleague who perhaps would not be in such a promising position."

In his second season at The Dell, 1900–01, Saints once again took the Southern League title, with Edgar Chadwick top-scorer with 14 goals. The 1901–02 season followed a similar pattern to 1899–1900 with Saints finishing in third place and reaching their second FA Cup final, losing to Sheffield United after a replay.

In the summer of 1902, he was tempted to join Derby County where he played alongside the famous England inside-right Steve Bloomer. His sojourn at Derby was not a success and he moved on to Newcastle United in January 1903 and then briefly to Tottenham Hotspur in February 1904, before returning to Southampton in the summer of 1904. By now his career was nearly over and he only made 13 appearances in the 1904–05 season, with Charles Webb competing with him for the No.7 shirt.

He quit the professional game at the end of the season and returned to his home town of Farnborough, where he played football and cricket for the South Farnborough Athletic club probably up to the Great War, leading them into the Southern League in 1909. He also joined his family's business in Farnborough, where he died in April 1925.

His brother, Harry Turner, also played for Southampton, between December 1903 and January 1905.

== Career statistics ==
=== Club ===
Appearances and goals by club, season and competition
Club	Season	League			FA Cup		Total	
Club	Season	Division	Apps	Goals	Apps	Goals	Apps	Goals
Southampton	1899–1900	Southern League	20	7	6	3	26	10
Southampton	1900–01	Southern League	20	7	1	0	21	7
Southampton	1901–02	Southern League	25	9	8	3	33	12
Southampton	Total		65	23	15	6	80	29
Derby County	1902–03	First Division	21	1	0	0	21	1
Newcastle United	1902–03	First Division	12	1	0	0	12	1
Newcastle United	1903–04	First Division	1	0	0	0	1	0
Newcastle United	Total		13	1	0	0	13	1
Tottenham Hotspur	1903–04	Southern League	6	5	0	0	6	5
Southampton	1904–05	Southern League	13	1	0	0	13	1
Career total			118	31	15	6	133	37

== Honours ==
Southampton

- Southern League First Division: 1900–01
- FA Cup finalist: 1900, 1902

England

- British Home Championship: 1900–01

== Bibliography ==
- Chalk, Gary; Holley, Duncan (1987). Saints – A complete record. Breedon Books. ISBN 0-907969-22-4.
- Chalk, Gary; Holley, Duncan; Bull, David (2013). All the Saints: A Complete Players' Who's Who of Southampton FC. Southampton: Hagiology Publishing. ISBN 978-0-9926-8640-6.
- Holley, Duncan; Chalk, Gary (1992). The Alphabet of the Saints. ACL & Polar Publishing. ISBN 0-9514862-3-3.
