= Joe French (footballer) =

English footballer

Personal information
- Full name: Joseph French
- Place of birth: Southampton, England
- Position: Centre-half

Youth career
- Clifton
- Southampton Oxford

Senior career*
Years	Team	Apps	(Gls)
1899–1901	Southampton	6	(0)
1901–1902	New Brompton	17	(0)
1902–19??	Freemantle		
- * Club domestic league appearances and goals

Joseph French was an English professional footballer who played at centre-half for Southampton and New Brompton in the 1900s.

== Football career ==
French was born in Southampton and was playing football in the local parks, where he was spotted by Harry Haynes who was coming to the end of his football career. French was given a trial by the Southern League champions Southampton in the summer of 1899 which led to a professional contract.

French spent most of his time at The Dell in the reserves but was a "capable understudy" to England international Arthur Chadwick. French made his first-team debut playing at centre-half on 31 March 1900 in a 3–2 victory over Bedminster, when Chadwick was one of several players who had been "rested" having played in the FA Cup semi-final against Millwall on the previous Saturday, followed by his England debut against Wales on Monday 26 March and the FA Cup semi-final replay on Wednesday 28 March, when the "Saints" won 3–0 to reach the Cup Final for the second time in three seasons.

As Chadwick was still away on England duty, French retained his place for two further matches, before Chadwick's return to the side at the start of a run of four defeats, as a consequence of which Southampton fell away in the league, eventually finishing in third place.

French made three further appearances in September/October 1900, before relinquishing the centre-half shirt to new signing Bert Lee, who was to go on to make nearly 300 appearances for the "Saints".

In the summer of 1901, French was transferred to fellow Southern League side, New Brompton where he made 17 appearances before returning to Southampton to play for Freemantle.
