= Herbert Banks =

English footballer (1874–1947)

Personal information
- Full name: Herbert Ernest Banks
- Date of birth: 19 June 1874
- Place of birth: Coventry, England
- Date of death: 1947 (aged 72–73)
- Place of death: Smethwick, England
- Position: Inside left

Youth career
- 72nd Seaforth Highlanders

Senior career*
Years	Team	Apps	(Gls)
1896–1897	Everton	2	(0)
1896–1897	→ St Mirren (loan)	0	(0)
1897–1899	Third Lanark	28	(3)
1899–1901	Millwall Athletic	26	(11)
1901	Aston Villa	5	(0)
1901–1903	Bristol City	40	(18)
1903–1904	Watford	19	(21)
1904–1905	Coventry City	18	(12)
1905–1906	Stafford Rangers		
- Veritys A

International career
1901	England	1	(0)
- * Club domestic league appearances and goals

Herbert Ernest Banks (19 June 1874 – 1947) was an English footballer who made over 40 appearances in the Football League, over 20 appearances in the Scottish League and over 40 appearances in the Southern League, scoring over 60 goals in a career as an inside left.

== Career ==
Banks played for Everton, St Mirren (on loan for one Scottish Cup tie), Third Lanark, Millwall Athletic, Aston Villa, Bristol City, Watford, Coventry City and Stafford Rangers. During his time at Millwall, Banks made an appearance for the England national side, in a 3–0 British Home Championship win against Ireland. At Watford, his goalscoring rate exceeded a goal per game.

== Personal life ==
Banks had pre-war service with the Seaforth Highlanders. During the First World War, he served in the Royal Garrison Artillery and then as a lance corporal in the Worcestershire Regiment.
