= Jimmy Yates =

English footballer (1871–1922)

Personal information
- Date of birth: 2 November 1869
- Place of birth: Tunstall, Staffordshire, England
- Date of death: 5 September 1922 (aged 52)
- Place of death: Southampton, England
- Position: Outside right

Youth career
- Kelvinhaugh

Senior career*
| Years | Team | Apps | (Gls) |
| 1891–1892 | Burnley | 0 | (0) |
| 1892–1893 | Ardwick | 20 | (9) |
| 1893–1897 | Sheffield United | 80 | (8) |
| 1897–1898 | Southampton | 13 | (6) |
| 1898–1899 | Gravesend United | 0 | (0) |
| 1899–1901 | Southampton | 49 | (10) |
| 1901–1903 | Hastings & St Leonards | | |
| 1905 | Southampton | 1 | (0) |
| 1905–1906 | Gravesend United | | |
| 1906 | Hastings & St Leonards | | |
| 1908–1909 | Salisbury City | | |
- * Club domestic league appearances and goals

James Yates (2 November 1869 – 5 September 1922) was an English professional footballer who played as a right winger in the 1900 FA Cup Final for Southampton.

== Playing career ==
Yates was born in Tunstall, Staffordshire, but started his professional career in November 1892 with Second Division Ardwick, after spending the 1891–92 season on the books of Burnley. He made his Ardwick debut on 24 December 1892 in a 2–1 defeat at the hands of Lincoln City. Toward the end of the season he hit a rich vein of goalscoring form, scoring five goals in six matches. In the 1893–94 season he played in 13 consecutive matches, scoring a brace in his final Ardwick appearance, a 3–0 win against Walsall Town Swifts. In total he made 21 appearances for Ardwick, scoring nine goals. In December 1893, after just under a year in Manchester, he moved back to his native town to join Sheffield United in the First Division. He spent four seasons with United playing at the top level in English football, and played a major part in them reaching the runners-up position in the 1896–97 season.

In the summer of 1897, he was one of four Football League players who were signed by Southern League champions Southampton. Described by Holley & Chalk as "a dapper, clever forward (who)when at his best, was virtually unstoppable" his first season at The Dell was often interrupted by ill-health and he was out of the team from March onwards, thus missing out on "Saints" first FA Cup Semi-final against Nottingham Forest. In the 1897–98 season he made thirteen appearances at the start of the season, before losing his place to Bob Brown, scoring six goals as Southampton again claimed the Southern League championship.

At the end of the season, because of his poor health, he decided not to sign a new contract and moved to Kent where he played for Gravesend United, also then in the Southern League. He returned to Southampton in March 1899, taking over from Tom Smith at outside-right, in time to help the Saints clinch the championship for the third successive season.

The following season, Saints were able to finish in only third place in the table, as they were concentrating their efforts on the FA Cup where they reached the final for the first time in their history, the highlight of which was a 4–1 drubbing of Newcastle United in which Yates was among the scorers. Unfortunately, the Cup Final was a great disappointment as Saints were swept aside 4–0 by Bury.

In 1900–01 he was part of the forward line-up which claimed the league title for the fourth time in five years after which he again left the club for an easier life in Sussex where he turned out occasionally for Hastings & St Leonards, keeping in touch with his former club by acting as a scout. He also spent some time in Denmark coaching for Copenhagen. On 6 July 1904, Yates became the first professional coach in Dutch football, when he signed a six-week contract with HVV.

In March 1905, after a brief period coaching with 93 Club, Copenhagen, he returned to The Dell for the third time (making him the only player in Southampton's history to sign for the club on three separate occasions). He only made one appearance (against Northampton Town on 18 March 1905) before finally retiring from playing football. In his three separate spells with Southampton, he made a total of 77 appearances, scoring 22 goals.

== Later career ==
Over the next few years, he again turned out for both Gravesend and Hastings & St Leonards, before coaching in Brazil and USA. While at Hastings, he "discovered" Horace Glover and recommended him to his former club – Glover went on to make over 170 appearances for Southampton in the next five years, before joining West Ham United.

He returned to Southampton in 1907, taking up employment as a stevedore in Southampton Docks. He was still dogged by ill-health resulting in him losing his job. Unable to find employment, he committed suicide on Southampton Common in September 1922.

== Honours ==
Sheffield United

- Football League First Division runners-up: 1896–97

Southampton

- FA Cup runners-up: 1900
- Southern League champions: 1897–98, 1898–99, 1900–01
