= Bob Petrie =

Scottish footballer

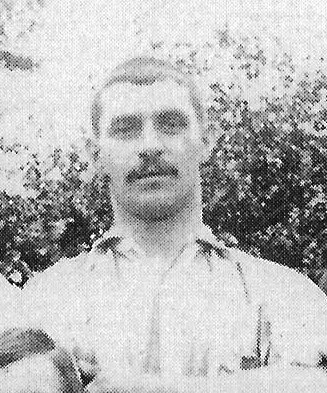
- Petrie in 1896

Personal information
- Date of birth: 25 October 1874
- Place of birth: Dundee, Scotland
- Date of death: 1947 (aged 72–73)
- Height: 5 ft 7 in (1.70 m)
- Position: Half back

Youth career
- Arbroath
- Dundee East End

Senior career*
Years	Team	Apps	(Gls)
1888–1890	Gainsborough Trinity	57	(0)
1893–1894	Dundee	13	(1)
1894–1897	Sheffield Wednesday	52	(3)
1897–1900	Southampton	50	(6)
1900–1901	New Brighton Tower	28	(0)
- Dundee Wanderers
1905–1908	Arbroath		
1908	Dundee Wanderers		
1908–19??	Brechin City		
- * Club domestic league appearances and goals

Robert Petrie (25 October 1874 – 1947) was a professional footballer who won the FA Cup with Sheffield Wednesday in 1896 and was on the losing side in the 1900 FA Cup final with Southampton.

== Playing career ==
Born in Dundee, Petrie started his career in his native Scotland, before moving south to join Sheffield Wednesday in April 1894. In round 1 of the 1896 FA Cup, Petrie was part of the Wednesday team that narrowly defeated his future employers, Southampton, before going on to win the final in April.

After three seasons with Wednesday, Petrie moved to the south coast to join Southern League champions Southampton in May 1897, displacing John Hodgkinson. In his first season with the Saints, playing alongside Arthur Chadwick and Samuel Meston in the half-back line, he only missed two league games as Southampton claimed the Southern League title yet again. In 1897–98, Saints also reached the semi-final of the FA Cup before going out to Nottingham Forest in a replay (played in a blizzard).

Described in Holley & Chalk's The Alphabet of the Saints as "very much a team player, Bob was never showy but always reliable and at his best when the chips were down.". He did, however, have a drink problem and shortly after joining Southampton was reprimanded by the board over his drinking.

In the 1889–99 season, as a result of injury, he lost his regular place to Scottish international John Robertson and only made nine appearances as Southampton (now in their new home at The Dell), took the league title for the third consecutive season.

In the following season, Robertson, having moved back to Scotland to join Rangers, Petrie resumed his place in the centre of the half-back line as Southampton took third place in the league but reached the final of the FA Cup against Bury. Southampton was the first Southern League club to reach the FA Cup final and had already beaten three top flight clubs on the way to the final but they failed to produce anything like their best form, conceding three goals in the first 20 minutes and eventually losing 4–0.

Two days after the final, Petrie made his final appearance for the Saints in a 4–1 league victory over Bristol City, after which he was replaced by fellow Scot Don Greenlees. In his three seasons with Southampton, he made a total of 68 appearances, scoring six goals.

In 1900 he moved to New Brighton Tower for their final season before the club was disbanded. He then returned to his native Scotland, playing out his career for a variety of clubs, including three years with Arbroath and a spell with Brechin City just short of his 40th birthday.

== Honours ==
Gainsborough Trinity

- Gainsborough News Charity Cup Winner: 1890
- Lincolnshire Football Association Challenge Cup Winner: 1890

Sheffield Wednesday

- FA Cup winner: 1896

Southampton

- FA Cup finalist: 1900
- Southern League championships: 1897–98 and 1898–99
