= Peter Meehan (footballer) =

Scottish footballer (1872–1915)

Personal information
- Full name: Peter Meehan
- Date of birth: 28 February 1872
- Place of birth: Broxburn, West Lothian, Scotland
- Date of death: 26 June 1915 (aged 43)
- Place of death: Port Morien, Nova Scotia, Canada
- Height: 5 ft 9 in (1.75 m)
- Position: Full-back

Senior career*
Years	Team	Apps	(Gls)
–	Broxburn Emmett		
–	Broxburn		
1890–1893	Broxburn Shamrock		
1893	Hibernian		
1893–1895	Sunderland	44	(1)
1895–1896	Celtic	25	(1)
1896–1898	Everton	24	(0)
1898–1900	Southampton	36	(1)
1900–1901	Manchester City	6	(0)
1901–1902	Barrow		
1902–1903	Broxburn		
1903–1904	Clyde	2	(0)
1904	Broxburn Shamrock		

International career
1896	Scotland	1	(0)
1896	Scottish League XI	1	(0)
- * Club domestic league appearances and goals

Peter Meehan (often misspelled "Meechan") (28 February 1872 – 26 June 1915) was a Scottish professional footballer who played as a full-back. He won the English league championship in 1894–95 with Sunderland and the Scottish Football League championship with Celtic in 1895–96. He also played in the 1897 FA Cup Final for Everton and the 1900 FA Cup Final for Southampton, and made one appearance for Scotland in 1896.

== Football career ==
Meehan was born in Broxburn, West Lothian, the son of a shale miner who had migrated from County Donegal in Ireland. In his youth, he played amateur football for three local football clubs Broxburn Emmett (juniors), Broxburn Shamrock and Broxburn F.C. In December 1891, Broxburn Shamrock played the holders of the Scottish Cup, Heart of Midlothian, in a sixth round tie. Despite being the team captain, Meehan refused to play in the match, won 5–4 by Hearts, because of a dispute over the "terms" under which he would play. In early 1893 he transferred to Hibernian, missing out on the later part of Shamrock's run to the semi-finals of the 1892–93 Scottish Cup.

In June 1893, he moved south of the border to join Sunderland for whom he made 60 appearances, scoring once, helping them to become Football League champions in 1894–95. While at Sunderland, he was the subject of a dispute in the West Lothian Courier, when a contributor challenged his right to register to vote at Broxburn while living and working in England.

In May 1895, Meehan returned to Scotland to join Celtic, helping them take the Scottish championship in 1895–96. In his time at Celtic, he made an appearance for the Scottish Football League against the Irish League on 15 February 1896, followed by his sole international appearance for Scotland in a 3–3 draw with Ireland on 28 March 1896, in which he suffered an injury. His Celtic career ended on a controversial note when he and two other players – John Divers and Barney Battles – refused to play a match against Hibernian in November 1896; they refused to play because of the presence at the stadium of a reporter who had heavily criticised Celtic following a Glasgow Cup defeat against Rangers the previous week. Following this "strike", Celtic suspended the three men, with Meehan and Divers being allowed to leave the club.

In January 1897, Meehan joined Everton for a £450 transfer fee that was split between Celtic and Sunderland, (Divers made the same move) and quickly helped them reach the final of the FA Cup in 1897, which was won 3–2 by Aston Villa. In his one and a half seasons with Everton, Meehan made a total of 28 appearances.

In August 1898, Meehan moved to the south coast for a club record fee of £200, when he joined a Southampton team that was dominating the Southern League and contained a host of international and ex-First Division players. So good were they that they easily despatched three top flight clubs, including Meehan's former Everton teammates, on their way to the 1900 FA Cup Final against Bury. On the day of the game, Meehan and his Scottish colleagues were angered by the selection of an out of form English forward, Jack Farrell, over the free-scoring Roddy McLeod who had played brilliantly in the games leading up to the final. The English players wanted their forward in the team and got their way. The bitterness between the two camps showed on the field and led to a 4–0 defeat.

Following the bitter dispute at Southampton, Meehan joined Manchester City in September 1900, for whom he made six appearances in the 1900–01 season. He made his City debut in a 2–1 win against Sheffield United.

He left Manchester at the end of the season to join Barrow in the Lancashire League for a season before re-joining Broxburn F.C. in March 1902. He then spent the 1903–04 season in Scottish Division Two with Clyde before returning to his home town to play out his career with Broxburn Shamrock.

== Life after football ==
In 1905, Meehan migrated to Nova Scotia in Canada, where he failed to find employment as a football coach and returned to mining.

Meehan died in Port Morien in mid-1915, aged 43, with his wife, Annie Thompson, expecting their eighth child. The cause of his death was variously attributed to appendicitis or pneumonia brought about after spending a night in the snow looking for a missing relative, possibly aggravated by his work as a miner.

== Honours ==
Sunderland

- Football League champions: 1894–95

Celtic

- Scottish Football League champions: 1895–96

Everton

- FA Cup finalist: 1897

Southampton

- Southern League champions: 1898–99
- FA Cup finalist: 1900
