= Peter Durber =

English footballer

Personal information
- Full name: Peter Durber
- Date of birth: 8 May 1873
- Place of birth: Stoke-upon-Trent, England
- Date of death: 16 March 1963 (aged 89)
- Height: 5 ft 8 in (1.73 m)
- Position: Full back

Youth career
- Wood Lane

Senior career*
Years	Team	Apps	(Gls)
- Audley Town
1896–1898	Stoke	27	(0)
1898–1900	Southampton	43	(0)
1900–1901	Stoke	33	(0)
1901–1902	Glossop North End	30	(0)
1902–1906	Northampton Town	112	(0)
Total		245	(0)
- * Club domestic league appearances and goals

Peter Durber (8 May 1873 – 16 March 1963) was an English footballer who played in the Football League for Glossop North End and Stoke. He played in the Southern League for Southampton with whom he played in the 1900 FA Cup Final, beating three First Division clubs along the way.

== Football career ==
Durber was born in Stoke-upon-Trent and played for Audley Town before joining Stoke in 1896. He played in two season under Horace Austerberry before leaving for Southampton in 1898. Durber was a defender who was part of Southampton's 1899 Southern League Championship winning team, and a finalist in the 1900 F.A. Cup final when the Saints were beaten 4–0 by Bury at the Crystal Palace. In May 2010, it was announced that his 1900 FA Cup runners-up medal and 1899 Southern League championship medal were to be sold at auction. The FA Cup Final medal was sold for £2,400.

He returned to Stoke in August 1900 and played 35 times in the 1900–01 season. He them spent a season with Glossop North End before enjoying a six-year spell at Northampton Town.

== Career statistics ==
Appearances and goals by club, season and competition
Club	Season	League			FA Cup		Total	
Club	Season	Division	Apps	Goals	Apps	Goals	Apps	Goals
Stoke	1896–97	First Division	17	0	2	0	19	0
Stoke	1897–98	First Division	10	0	1	0	11	0
Southampton	1898–99	Southern League	16	0	3	0	19	0
Southampton	1899–1900	Southern League	27	0	6	0	33	0
Stoke	1900–01	First Division	33	0	2	0	35	0
Glossop North End	1901–02	Second Division	30	0	2	0	32	0
Career total			133	0	16	0	149	0

== Honours ==
Southampton

- Southern League Championship 1898–99
- FA Cup finalist: 1900
