= George Molyneux =

English footballer and manager

Personal information
- Date of birth: 31 July 1875
- Place of birth: Kirkdale, Liverpool, England
- Date of death: 14 April 1942 (aged 66)
- Place of death: Rochford, England
- Height: 5 ft 10 in (1.78 m)
- Position: Full back

Youth career
- 3rd Grenadiers
- South Shore

Senior career*
Years	Team	Apps	(Gls)
1894–1896	Kirkdale		
1896–1897	Everton	1	(0)
1897–1898	Wigan County	34	(0)
1898–1900	Everton	42	(0)
1900–1905	Southampton	142	(0)
1905–1906	Portsmouth	23	(0)
1906–1911	Southend United		
1911–19??	Colchester Town		

International career
1902–1903	England	4	(0)

Managerial career
- 1910–1911: Southend United (player-manager)
- * Club domestic league appearances and goals

George Molyneux (31 July 1875 – 14 April 1942) was a professional footballer who played for Everton, Southampton and Southend United, and later became Southend's manager.

He played in the 1902 FA Cup Final for Southampton, and won four England caps. After a 1905 move from Southampton to Portsmouth, he moved to Southend in 1906.

== Honours ==
Southampton

- FA Cup finalist: 1902
