= Roddy McLeod =

Scottish footballer (1872–1931)

Personal information
- Full name: Roderick McLeod
- Date of birth: 12 February 1872
- Place of birth: Kilsyth, Scotland
- Date of death: 20 December 1931 (aged 59)
- Place of death: Southwark, England
- Position: Forward

Youth career
- 1888–1889: Westburn

Senior career*
Years	Team	Apps	(Gls)
1889–1891	Partick Thistle	0	(0)
1891–1897	West Bromwich Albion	149	(50)
1897–1898	Leicester Fosse	27	(13)
1898–1899	Brighton United		
1899–1900	Southampton	20	(6)
1900–1906	Brentford	20	(14)
- * Club domestic league appearances and goals

Roderick McLeod (12 February 1872 – 20 December 1931) was a Scottish professional footballer who was part of the West Bromwich Albion team which won the FA Cup in 1892 and was a losing finalist in 1895.

== Playing career ==
=== West Bromwich Albion ===
McLeod was born in Kilsyth, North Lanarkshire. After representing Kilsyth & Kirkintillock Schools and Westburn FC, he turned professional with Partick Thistle in April 1889. He made 38 cup and friendly appearances, scoring 9 goals, before moving to England in January 1891 to join West Bromwich Albion for a £50 fee. He made his debut the following month against Sheffield Wednesday in the FA Cup third round. His arrival at Stoney Lane came too late to prevent Albion finishing the 1890–91 season at the foot of the table and having to apply for re-election to the Football League.

He started the following season with two goals in the opening match against Everton, but the remainder of the league season was again disappointing as Albion finished 12th (out of 14). In the FA Cup, however, Albion enjoyed great success reaching the final after a drawn out semi-final against Nottingham Forest which went to three matches, with the second replay (won 6–2) taking place in a snowstorm. In the Final against Aston Villa, played at Kennington Oval on 19 March 1892, Albion's Cup experience proved the difference between the two Midlands sides. McLeod's cross to Jasper Geddes set up Albion's first goal, and Albion finished 3–0 victors, with the other goals coming from Sammy Nicholls and Jack Reynolds.

In the next season, McLeod was ever-present and finished with ten league goals as Albion finished mid-table. In the following season McLeod scored in each of the first three matches. He continued to score regularly throughout the season, including a hat-trick on 27 December 1893 in an 8–0 victory at Wolverhampton Wanderers, to finish the season as top scorer with fourteen league goals.

McLeod retained his place alongside Billy Bassett in the heart of Albion's forward line for the 1894–95 season. Again this was disappointing in the league (finishing 13th out of 16), but Albion again reached the FA Cup Final for the fifth time. The final itself was disappointing with Aston Villa's defence dominating throughout as Villa avenged their defeat three years earlier, running out the victors with the only goal being credited to Bob Chatt who scored the fastest goal in FA Cup history, scored after just 30 seconds.

The 1895–96 season was again disappointing with Albion finishing at the bottom of the table. McLeod was top scorer (jointly with William Richards) with a meagre six goals. West Bromwich came through the end of season "test matches" to retain the place in the First Division.

Despite Albion's poor form in the two preceding seasons, their directors retained most of the same team for 1896–97. McLeod was once again on target for the opening match (a 2–1 success at Blackburn Rovers), but this early-season promise was not fulfilled and Albion again struggled finishing in 12th position with McLeod only managing to contribute four goals.

In his seven seasons with West Bromwich Albion, McLeod made 169 appearances in all competitions and scored 57 goals.

=== Leicester Fosse and Brighton ===
In the summer of 1897 McLeod moved to spend a season with Leicester Fosse, where he was top scorer for 1897–98 with 13 league goals. A tempting offer from Brighton United then persuaded him to move to the south coast in May 1898 to join them in the Southern League. He scored on his debut for Brighton with the consolation goal in a 4–1 defeat in the opening match at Southampton's newly built stadium, The Dell. Despite being Brighton's top scorer, the club's financial troubles forced them to release McLeod from his contract in April 1899.

=== Southampton ===
McLeod was persuaded to remain in the Southern League with Southampton and played the final three matches of their 1898–99 Southern League championship season. Described by Holley & Chalk as "baby-faced and small in stature" he was "a splendid forward who had the ability to turn a game by using his deft footwork". He retained his place for the start of the following season but after the first five matches, in which he failed to score, he lost his place to Archie Turner. McLeod eventually regained his place in the side in January and for the remainder of the season he vied with Jack Farrell for the No. 9 shirt. He replaced the injured Farrell in an FA Cup match against Newcastle United in which he scored twice in a 4–1 victory. He followed this with the winning goal in the next round in a 2–1 victory over his former club, West Bromwich Albion.

McLeod also found his goal-scoring form in the league with a run of three goals in three matches at the start of April 1900, but lost his place in the FA Cup side to Farrell. Saints reached the FA Cup Final for the first time in their history, but failed dismally on the day going down 4–0 to Bury. Saints' failure in the final was later attributed to a dispute between the players, with the Scottish players wanting McLeod to play whereas the English players, and the board, went for Farrell, despite Farrell being off-form, having failed to score in any competition since January.

=== After Southampton ===
Understandably disappointed he moved to join Brentford in August 1900, helping them take the Southern League Second Division title in 1901. He remained at Brentford until finally retiring from professional football in 1906.

He subsequently fell on hard times, and in March 1911 Southampton made an appeal on his behalf for employment as a warehouseman. He later worked in a brewery and then as a boiler mechanic in London. He died in Lambeth in December 1931.

== Honours ==
West Bromwich Albion

- FA Cup: 1891–92

Southampton

- Southern League First Division: 1898–99

Brentford

- Southern League Second Division: 1900–01
