= Gravesend United F.C. =

Gravesend United
- Full name: Gravesend United Football Club
- Nickname: The Shrimpers
- Founded: 1893
- Dissolved: 1946
- Stadium: Overcliffe Ground (1893–1902); Pelham Road (1903–1914); Central Avenue (1932–1946)
Home colours

Gravesend United Football Club was a football club based in Gravesend, Kent. The club evolved from the Gravesend Football Club and was initially founded in 1893. It disbanded on two occasions in 1902 and 1914 and subsequent reformed in 1903 and 1931. It finally dissolved in 1946 when it amalgamated with Northfleet United to form Gravesend & Northfleet F.C.

== History ==
The Gravesend Football Club in 1886 had sections playing both Rugby football and Association football. In the 1888–89 season the association football team reached the Kent Senior Cup semi–final, losing to eventual winners Chatham. In 1891 the rugby section was dropped and the club concentrated on association football playing at the Bat and Ball cricket ground. In 1891–92 the club were runners–up in the Kent Senior Cup (being overpowered in losing the final 11–0 to the Dover based Highland Light Infantry team).

In 1893 the cricket club refused the football club continued use of the Bat and Ball ground and consequently Gravesend United FC was formed amalgamating the Gravesend Football club with Gravesend Ormonde. The new club leased land at Overcliffe for their home ground and their team colours were red and green striped shirt with white shorts. In 1894 a company was formed (taking most of the profit from, but not managing, the football operation) to develop the ground with provision of a wooden stand and dressing rooms.

The club, nicknamed 'the Shrimpers', were founder members of the Kent League in 1894–95. In 1895 the Kent League recognised professional players and 'United' formally then became a club employing professional players. After two seasons in the Kent League the club switched in 1896–97 to the higher standard Southern League where they remained for five seasons. Initially 'the Shrimpers' finished in mid table but over the seasons their position deteriorated and in the 1900–01 campaign they concluded their period in the Southern League 13th of 15 teams.

For the five seasons whilst the club were members of the Southern League they entered the FA Cup competition. 'United' achieved a club best in 1898–99 by reaching the Fifth Qualifying round, being one of the remaining 42 clubs in that seasons competition before losing in a replay 2–0 to New Brompton. During this period the Gravesend United team twice won the Kent Senior Cup: in 1898 beating Dartford 3–1; and in 1900 beating Maidstone United 4–1 in a replayed final following a 1–1 draw.

The club were founder members in 1896–97 with five neighbouring clubs of the midweek Thames and Medway Combination and were runners–up in the inaugural season. A year later in 1897–98 'the Shrimpers' were Thames and Medway Combination champions after a play–off match 3–1 win over Chatham with whom they had been tied on equal points at the head of the table. The team were runners–up again in 1898–99 and once more the Thames and Medway's top club in the 1900–01 season (in a four team league).

In November 1898 Gravesend United absorbed the financially troubled neighbouring club Northfleet F.C. Despite this being styled as an amalgamation the club continued to be known as Gravesend United and continued playing in Gravesend's green and red colours and on their Overcliffe ground.

'The Shrimpers' final season in the Southern League in 1900–01 was in doubt both before and during the season. Prior to the season the Southern League organisation threatened to exclude them over refusal to pay a fine. This related to the previous season when the club prioritised a Kent Cup match and scratched a league fixture due to be played on the same date. The Football Association ruled that the Southern League had acted improperly in imposing the fine and the league reluctantly agreed to reinstate 'United'. As the season progressed the club, which had been on a financial tightrope for some time, faced an acute financial crisis: they had insufficient cash in mid–season to meet the rental for the clubs ground – donations to cover the cost resolved the immediate issue.

For the 1901–02 season 'United' were originally set to join the Southern League Division 2 but owing to their financial predicament the team opted to return to the less costly Kent League. Needing to keep outgoings low 'the Shrimpers' fielded a team comprising amateur players in a league in which clubs fielded professional players: the team consequently won only one of 19 matches played and were the league's bottom club. The ongoing financial difficulties led to the club disbanding at the end of the season and the Company behind the clubs Overcliffe ground improvements liquidated itself and sold–off the stand and fittings.

After a one-year hiatus a Gravesend club resurfaced in 1903–04 playing in the West Kent League (having taken over the defunct Deptford's fixtures) with a reserve team in the Dartford and District League. The club played on an enclosed ground at White Post off Pelham Road in the town. The club resurrected the Gravesend United name for the 1904–05 season and continued as West Kent League members.

Thereafter from the 1905–06 season the club joined the Kent League and in both that initial campaign and then in 1908–09 'the Shrimpers' were runners–up in the league losing out on each occasion by two points, to New Brompton and Northfleet United respectively. Upon joining the Kent League, which initially had 8 member teams, to fill out their season 'United' also rejoined the Thames and Medway Combination for initially two seasons before in 1907–08 switching to the West Kent League Division 1 as a secondary competition. In this latter league the team were runners–up for the 1907–08 season by a two-point margin to Northfleet United. 'The Shrimpers' remained in the West Kent for one more season after which following reorganisation and expansion of the Kent League (which added a Western Division which incorporated members of the West Kent League) for the 1909–10 campaign the team returned for two final seasons as members of the Thames and Medway Combination – in the latter season the league comprised two three team sections. By 1911 the Kent League had expanded to 15 members requiring its member clubs to play 28 fixtures.

In 1910–11 'United' were losing Kent Senior Cup semi–finalists and two seasons later in 1912–13 the team were Kent Senior Cup runners–up losing the final 2–1 to local rivals Northfleet United. The club commenced the 1914–15 season playing in the Kent League but owing to the outbreak of the Great War the league was cancelled and the Gravesend United club disbanded.

The club didn't immediately reappear after the war owing chiefly to their inability to secure a ground on which to play. In 1928 the funds, amounting to over £89, of the now defunct Gravesend United club which had been disbanded at the start of the war were distributed to charity.

The Gravesend United name returned to football in 1932 in the Western Section Division 1 of the Kent Amateur League when the formerly named Gravesend Territorials, who played at Central Avenue in Gravesend, decided to run as a 'civil' club and took on the 'United' name. The Territorials had been league runners–up in the 1930–31 campaign and in the 'United' clubs first season of 1932–33 the team equalled this achievement. For the following two seasons (from 1933 through to 1935) 'the Shrimpers' were members of the Kent League Division 2 with a reserve team continuing in the Kent Amateur League. Gravesend United were semi–finalists in the 1933–34 Kent Amateur Cup losing, following a replay, to the eventual winners the Chatham Royal Naval Depot.

After the 1934–35 season Division 2 of the Kent League was disbanded and 'United' returned to the now expanded Kent Amateur League and were the 1935–36 season champions of the newly formed Western Section Premier Division. The club continued in this league for a further three seasons whereupon matches were suspended owing to the outbreak of World War II.

'The Shrimpers' joined the wartime Kent Senior League for three seasons from 1942 and additionally played in the wartime South Eastern Combination for two seasons (1943–44 & 1944–45). The team were losing semi–finalists in the Kent Senior Cup in both 1942 and 1943 and progressed one stage further in 1944 to the Kent Senior Cup final where they were beaten 5–3 by the Royal Arsenal (Woolwich). The Kent League resumed in 1944–45 with 'the Shrimpers' as members and the team were losing semi–finalists in the League Cup competition. The club played its final season as Gravesend United in 1945–46 as members of the Kent League and towards the end of that campaign were beaten at the semi–final stage of both the Kent League Cup and the Kent Senior Cup competitions.

In 1946 the club merged with Northfleet United to form Gravesend & Northfleet F.C. The new club played at Stonebridge Road, the ground of the Northfleet United club in the latter teams red and white colours.

In 2007 the Gravesend & Northfleet club renamed itself as Ebbsfleet United.

== Honours ==
- Kent League
  - Runners–up: 1905–06; 1908–09.
- Thames and Medway Combination
  - Champions: 1897–98; 1900–01.
  - Runners–up: 1896–97; 1898–99.
- West Kent League
  - Division 1: Runners–up: 1907–08.
- Kent Amateur League
  - Western Section; Premier Division: Champions: 1935–36.
  - Western Section; Division 1: Runners–up: 1932–33.
- Kent Senior Cup
  - Winners: 1897–98; 1899–1900.
  - Runners–up: 1891–92 (As Gravesend FC); 1912–1913; 1943–1944.

== Season playing records ==
Season	Lge	Pld	W	D	L	GF	GA	Pts	Pos	FA Cup	Other*
1888–89	–										sf:KSC†
1891–92	–										ru:KSC†
1894–95	Kent League Div 1	16	6	5	5	54	33	17	4/9	–	
1895–96	Kent League Div 1	22	10	4	8	36	44	20	8/12	–	(–4 pts)
1896–97	Southern League Div 1	20	9	4	7	35	34	22	5/11	2Q	
1896–97	Thames & Medway C. 1	10	5	4	1	28	10	14	2/6	2Q	
1897–98	Southern League Div 1	22	7	6	9	28	39	20	8/12	2Q	w:KSC
1897–98	Thames & Medway C.	14	10	1	3	38	14	21	1/8	2Q	w:KSC
1898–99	Southern League Div 1	24	7	5	12	42	52	19	11/13	5Q	
1898–99	Thames & Medway C.	16	12	1	3	53	21	25	2/9	5Q	
1899–1900	Southern League Div 1	28	10	4	14	38	58	24	12/15	P	w:KSC
1899–1900	Thames & Medway C.	10	2	7	1	16	14	11	4/6	P	w:KSC
1900–01	Southern League Div 1	28	6	7	15	32	85	19	13/15	1Q	
1900–01	Thames & Medway C.	6	4	2	0	8	2	10	1/4	1Q	
1901–02	Kent League	19	1	2	16	23	89	4	11/11	–	
1901–02	Thames & Medway C.	8	1	1	6	10	32	3	?/7	–	incomplete
1902–03	No active Gravesend United team										
1903–04	West Kent League†	13	4	4	5	23	24	12	4/8	–	
1904–05	West Kent League	20	11	3	6	39	27	25	4/11	P	
1905–06	Kent League	14	10	1	3	44	21	21	2/8	–	
1905–06	Thames & Medway C.	12	2	2	8	14	32	6	7/7	–	
1906–07	Kent League	14	7	1	6	39	27	15	3/8	3Q	
1906–07	Thames & Medway C. A	10	4	1	5	20	21	9	3/6	3Q	
1907–08	Kent League	14	5	1	8	21	26	11	7/9	2Q	
1907–08	West Kent Lge D1	20	16	0	4	58	22	32	2/11	2Q	
1908–09	Kent League	16	11	3	2	40	16	25	2/9	P	
1908–09	West Kent Lge D1	15	11	1	3	54	16	23	?/11	P	incomplete
1909–10	Kent League Div 1	22	9	5	8	34	36	23	6/12	–	
1909–10	Thames & Medway C.	11	2	2	7	18	80	6	?/7	–	incomplete
1910–11	Kent League Div 1	26	8	6	12	37	53	22	7/14	2Q	sf:KSC
1910–11	Thames & Medway C.	2	1	0	1	3	1	2	?/3	2Q	incomplete
1911–12	Kent League Div 1	28	12	5	11	64	60	29	5/15	1Q	
1912–13	Kent League Div 1	28	7	7	14	34	52	21	12/15	1Q	ru:KSC
1913–14	Kent League Div 1	30	10	6	14	51	52	26	11/16	3Q	
1914–32	No active Gravesend United team										
1932–33	Kent Am.Lge W D1	14	8	2	4	38	26	18	2/8	–	
1933–34	Kent League Div 2	24	13	4	7	75	46	30	4/13	–	sf:KAC
1934–35	Kent League Div 2	21	7	1	13	37	94	15	?/13	P	incomplete
1935–36	Kent Am.Lge W Pr	20	16	3	1	85	32	35	1/11	1Q	
1936–37	Kent Am.Lge W Pr	20	10	3	7	41	38	23	5/11	–	
1937–38	Kent Am.Lge W Pr	20	12	4	4	46	24	28	3/11	–	
1938–39	Kent Am.Lge W Pr	24	6	6	12	52	92	18	8/13	–	
1939–40	–									EP	
1941–42	–										sf:KSC
1942–43	Kent Senior Lge	27	22	1	4	119	49	45	2/16	–	sf:KSC
1943–44	Kent Senior Lge A	21	13	2	6	105	45	28	2/12	–	ru:KSC
1944–45	Kent League	18	7	3	8	39	50	17	7/10	–	sf:KLC
1945–46	Kent League	20	9	3	8	62	52	21	3/11	2Q	sf:KSC & KLC

Key

League Record

- Pld = Played
- W = Games won
- D = Games drawn
- L = Games lost
- GF = Goals for
- GA = Goals against
- Pts = Points
- Pos = Final position/rank

FA Cup

- EP = Extra Preliminary round
- P = Preliminary round
- 1Q = First qualifying round
- 2Q = Second qualifying round
- 3Q = Third qualifying round
- 4Q = Fourth qualifying round
- 5Q = Fifth qualifying round

Other

- KSC = Kent Senior Cup
- KAC = Kent Amateur Cup
- KLC = Kent League Cup
- † = Club named Gravesend FC
