= 1900–01 Southern Football League =

The 1900–01 season was the seventh in the history of the Southern League. Southampton were Division One champions for the fourth time in five seasons, whilst Bristol City were the only Southern League team applied for election. Finally they were elected to the Football League.

== Division One ==
Southern Football League Division One
- Season: 1900–01
- Champions: Southampton (4th title)
- Promoted: Bristol City
- Relegated: Gravesend United (resigned); Chatham Town (resigned)
- Matches: 210
- Goals: 616 (2.93 per match)

A total of 16 teams contest the division, including 13 sides from previous season and three new teams.

Team promoted from Division Two:

- Watford

Newly elected teams:

- Luton Town - relegated from 1899–1900 Football League
- Kettering - promoted as Midland League champions

Pos	Team	Pld	W	D	L	GF	GA	GR	Pts	Promotion or relegation
1	Southampton	28	18	5	5	58	26	2.231	41	
2	Bristol City	28	17	5	6	54	27	2.000	39	Elected to the Football League Second Division
3	Portsmouth	28	17	4	7	56	32	1.750	38	
4	Millwall Athletic	28	17	2	9	55	32	1.719	36	
5	Tottenham Hotspur	28	16	4	8	55	33	1.667	36	
6	West Ham United	28	14	5	9	40	28	1.429	33	
7	Bristol Rovers	28	14	4	10	46	35	1.314	32	
8	Queens Park Rangers	28	11	4	13	43	48	0.896	26	
9	Reading	28	8	8	12	24	25	0.960	24	
10	Luton Town	28	11	2	15	43	49	0.878	24	
11	Kettering	28	7	9	12	33	46	0.717	23	
12	New Brompton	28	7	5	16	34	51	0.667	19	
13	Gravesend United	28	6	7	15	32	85	0.376	19	Dropped into Kent League at end of season
14	Watford	28	6	4	18	24	52	0.462	16	Relegation test matches
15	Swindon Town	28	3	8	17	19	47	0.404	14	Relegation test matches
16	Chatham Town	0	0	0	0	0	0	—	0	Resigned from league after 10 matches, record expunged

Rules for classification: The system of using goal average to separate two teams tied on points was used up until the 1976-77 season. The points system: 2 points for a win, 1 point for a draw and 0 points for losing.

== Division Two ==
Southern Football League Division Two
- Season: 1900–01
- Champions: Brentford
- Promoted: Brentford
- Relegated: Sheppey United (resigned)
- Matches: 72
- Goals: 329 (4.57 per match)

A total of nine teams contest the division, including 8 sides from previous season and one new team.

Team relegated from Division One:

- Sheppey United

Pos	Team	Pld	W	D	L	GF	GA	GR	Pts	Qualification or relegation
1	Brentford	16	14	2	0	63	11	5.727	30	Promotion test matches
2	Grays United	16	12	2	2	62	12	5.167	26	Promotion test matches
3	Sheppey United	16	8	1	7	44	26	1.692	17	Dropped into Kent League at end of season
4	Shepherds Bush	16	8	1	7	30	30	1.000	17	
5	Fulham London	16	8	0	8	38	26	1.462	16	
6	Chesham Town	16	5	1	10	26	39	0.667	11	
7	Maidenhead	16	4	1	11	21	49	0.429	9	
8	Wycombe Wanderers	16	4	1	11	23	68	0.338	9	
9	Southall	16	4	1	11	22	68	0.324	9	

Rules for classification: The system of using goal average to separate two teams tied on points was used up until the 1976-77 season. The points system: 2 points for a win, 1 point for a draw and 0 points for losing.

== Promotion-relegation test matches ==
At the end of the season, test matches were held between the bottom two clubs in Division One and the top two clubs in Division Two. Both matches resulted in 0-0 draws, and both Division One teams retained their places in the top division. However, although Brentford were promoted, Grays United were not after refusing to play extra-time in their match against Watford.

Division One clubs	v	Division Two clubs

Swindon Town	0 – 0	Brentford

Watford	0 – 0	Grays United

== Football League elections ==
Only one Southern League club, Bristol City, applied for election to Division Two of the Football League. They were successful after finishing in second place in the ballot.

Club	League	First round votes	Second round votes
Burton Swifts	Football League	23	
Bristol City	Southern League	23	
Stockport County	Football League	16	21
Doncaster Rovers	Midland League	16	13
Walsall Town Swifts	Football League	7	
Crewe Alexandra	Lancashire League		
Darwen	Lancashire League		
Stalybridge Rovers	Lancashire League		
Southport Central	Lancashire League		
