= 1905–06 Tottenham Hotspur F.C. season =

English football club season

Tottenham Hotspur
1905–06 season
- Stadium: White Hart Lane
- Southern League: 5th
- Western League: 4th
- FA Cup: Third round
- Top goalscorer: League: Herbert Chapman (11); All: Peter Kyle (18)

The 1905–06 season was Tottenham's tenth season as a fully professional club and the 23rd year in existence. They competed in two leagues, the main being the Southern Football League with a midweek game in the Western League along with competing in the FA Cup.

In the Southern League Tottenham finished in fifth place with a notable 6–0 win against New Brompton. The Western League saw a couple of 5–0 wins, but Spurs finished the season only in 4th place.

In the FA Cup Tottenham made it to the third round where they lost to Birmingham 2–0 in a reply.

== Squad ==
Note: Flags indicate national team as defined under FIFA eligibility rules; some limited exceptions apply. Players may hold more than one non-FIFA nationality.

Pos.	Nation	Player
GK	ENG	Jack Eggett
GK	ENG	John Whitbourne
DF	ENG	Jimmy Freeborough
DF	ENG	John George
DF	SCO	John Watson
DF	ENG	Walter Bull
DF	ENG	Jabez Darnell
DF	ENG	Oliver Burton
DF	ENG	Allan Leach-Lewis
DF	SCO	Jack Chaplin
DF	SCO	Sandy Tait
MF	SCO	Alex Glen
MF	IRL	Charles O'Hagan
MF	WAL	Ted Hughes

Pos.	Nation	Player
MF	SCO	William Murray
MF		John Shackleton
MF	ENG	Alfred Whyman
MF	ENG	Tom Morris
FW	ENG	George Page
FW	ENG	Christopher Carrick
FW	ENG	John Brearley
FW	ENG	Harold Stansfield
FW	ENG	Herbert Chapman
FW	ENG	Joe Walton
FW	ENG	William Berry
FW	ENG	Vivian Woodward
FW	SCO	Peter Kyle

== Transfers ==
=== In ===
Date from	Position	Nationality	Name	From	Fee	Ref.
1905	DF	(England)	Jabez Darnell	Northampton Town	Unknown	
1905	FW	(Scotland)	Peter Kyle		Unknown	
April 1905	FW	(England)	Christopher Carrick	West Ham United	Unknown	
May 1905	DF	(Scotland)	Jack Chaplin	Dundee	Unknown	
May 1905	GK	(England)	John Whitbourne	Sunderland	Unknown	
April 1906	FW	(England)	George Page	Cheshunt	Trial	(Note: George Page only played two games for Tottenham Hotspur, one Southern League game against Norwich City in 1906 and one Western League fixture. He never signed on to Spurs and left the club to play for Leeds City.)

=== Out ===
Date	Position	Nationality	Name	To	Fee	Ref.
1905	DF	(England)	John Burton	Preston North End	Unknown	

== Competitions ==
=== Southern League ===
==== Table ====
Pos	Team	Pld	W	D	L	GF	GA	GR	Pts
3	Portsmouth	34	17	9	8	61	35	1.743	43
4	Luton Town	34	17	7	10	64	40	1.600	41
5	Tottenham Hotspur	34	16	7	11	46	29	1.586	39
6	Plymouth Argyle	34	16	7	11	52	33	1.576	39
7	Norwich City	34	13	10	11	46	38	1.211	36

Rules for classification: The system of using goal average to separate two teams tied on points was used until the 1976-77 season. The points system: 2 points for a win, 1 point for a draw and 0 points for losing.

==== Results ====
2 September 1905 1	Reading	1–1	Tottenham Hotspur	Reading, Berkshire
			Kyle	Stadium: Elm Park

9 September 1905 2	Tottenham Hotspur	1–0	Watford	Tottenham, London
				Stadium: White Hart Lane

16 September 1905 3	Brighton & Hove Albion	2–0	Tottenham Hotspur	Hove, East Sussex
				Stadium: Goldstone Ground

23 September 1905 4	Tottenham Hotspur	2–0	West Ham United	Tottenham, London
				Stadium: White Hart Lane

30 September 1905 5	Fulham	0–0	Tottenham Hotspur	Fulham, London
				Stadium: Craven Cottage

7 October 1905 6	Tottenham Hotspur	2–1	Queens Park Rangers	Tottenham, London
				Stadium: White Hart Lane

14 October 1905 7	Bristol Rovers	0–2	Tottenham Hotspur	Eastville, Bristol
				Stadium: Eastville Stadium

21 October 1905 8	Tottenham Hotspur	6–0	New Brompton	Tottenham, London
				Stadium: White Hart Lane

4 November 1905 9	Tottenham Hotspur	2–1	Swindon Town	Tottenham, London
				Stadium: White Hart Lane

11 November 1905 10	Millwall	2–1	Tottenham Hotspur	Isle of Dogs, London
				Stadium: North Greenwich

18 November 1905 11	Tottenham Hotspur	1–0	Luton Town	Tottenham, London
				Stadium: White Hart Lane

25 November 1905 12	Tottenham Hotspur	2–0	Northampton Town	Tottenham, London
				Stadium: White Hart Lane

2 December 1905 13	Brentford	0–3	Tottenham Hotspur	Brentford, London
				Stadium: Griffin Park

16 December 1905 14	Plymouth Argyle	2–1	Tottenham Hotspur	Plymouth, Devon
				Stadium: Home Park

25 December 1905 15	Tottenham Hotspur	3–1	Portsmouth	Tottenham, London
				Stadium: White Hart Lane

26 December 1905 16	Southampton	1–0	Tottenham Hotspur	Southampton, Hampshire
				Stadium: The Dell

30 December 1905 17	Tottenham Hotspur	1–0	Reading	Tottenham, London
				Stadium: White Hart Lane

6 January 1906 18	Watford	0–0	Tottenham Hotspur	Watford, Hertfordshire
				Stadium: Cassio Road

20 January 1906 19	Tottenham Hotspur	3–1	Brighton & Hove Albion	Tottenham, London
				Stadium: White Hart Lane

27 January 1906 20	West Ham United	0–1	Tottenham Hotspur	Upton Park, London
				Stadium: Boleyn Ground

10 February 1906 21	Queens Park Rangers	0–0	Tottenham Hotspur	Park Royal, London
				Stadium: Royal Agricultural Society showgrounds

12 February 1906 22	Tottenham Hotspur	0–1	Fulham	Tottenham, London
				Stadium: White Hart Lane

17 February 1906 23	Tottenham Hotspur	2–2	Bristol Rovers	Tottenham, London
				Stadium: White Hart Lane

5 March 1906 24	Tottenham Hotspur	0–1	New Brompton	Tottenham, London
				Stadium: White Hart Lane

10 March 1906 25	Swindon Town	2–0	Tottenham Hotspur	Swindon, Wiltshire
				Stadium: County Ground

17 March 1906 26	Millwall	1–3	Tottenham Hotspur	Isle of Dogs, London
				Stadium: North Greenwich

24 March 1906 27	Luton Town	2–0	Tottenham Hotspur	Luton, Bedfordshire
				Stadium: Kenilworth Road

31 March 1906 28	Tottenham Hotspur	0–0	Northampton Town	Tottenham, London
				Stadium: White Hart Lane

7 April 1906 29	Brentford	1–4	Tottenham Hotspur	Brentford, London
				Stadium: Griffin Park

13 April 1906 30	Tottenham Hotspur	1–1	Southampton	Tottenham, London
				Stadium: White Hart Lane

14 April 1906 31	Tottenham Hotspur	1–4	Norwich City	Tottenham, London
				Stadium: White Hart Lane

16 April 1906 32	Portsmouth	1–0	Tottenham Hotspur	Portsmouth, Hampshire
				Stadium: Fratton Park

17 April 1906 33	Norwich City	0–3	Tottenham Hotspur	Norwich, Norfolk
				Stadium: Newmarket Road

21 April 1906 34	Tottenham Hotspur	0–1	Plymouth Argyle	Tottenham, London
				Stadium: White Hart Lane

=== Western League ===
==== Table ====
Pos	Team	Pld	W	D	L	GF	GA	GR	Pts
1	Queens Park Rangers	20	11	4	5	33	27	1.222	26
2	Southampton	20	10	5	5	41	35	1.171	25
3	Plymouth Argyle	20	8	8	4	34	23	1.478	24
4	Tottenham Hotspur	20	7	7	6	28	17	1.647	21
5	Bristol Rovers	20	8	3	9	34	34	1.000	19
6	Millwall	20	7	5	8	28	29	0.966	19
7	Portsmouth	20	6	7	7	26	29	0.897	19
8	West Ham United	20	7	5	8	32	35	0.914	19
9	Reading	20	6	6	8	28	35	0.800	18
10	Fulham	20	5	5	10	23	32	0.719	15
11	Brentford	20	6	3	11	25	36	0.694	15

==== Results ====
4 September 1905 1	Tottenham Hotspur	5–1	Reading	Tottenham, London
				Stadium: White Hart Lane

11 September 1905 2	Queens Park Rangers	1–1	Tottenham Hotspur	Park Royal, London
				Stadium: Royal Agricultural Society showgrounds

25 September 1905 3	Tottenham Hotspur	0–1	Bristol Rovers	Tottenham, London
				Stadium: White Hart Lane

2 October 1905 4	Tottenham Hotspur	0–2	Plymouth Argyle	Tottenham, London
				Stadium: White Hart Lane

11 October 1905 5	Reading	0–0	Tottenham Hotspur	Reading, Berkshire
				Stadium: Elm Park

16 October 1905 6	Tottenham Hotspur	1–0	Fulham	Tottenham, London
				Stadium: White Hart Lane

23 October 1905 7	Tottenham Hotspur	5–0	Millwall	Tottenham, London
				Stadium: White Hart Lane

28 October 1905 8	Portsmouth	0–0	Tottenham Hotspur	Portsmouth, Hampshire
				Stadium: Fratton Park

6 November 1905 9	West Ham United	4–1	Tottenham Hotspur	Upton Park, London
				Stadium: Boleyn Ground

13 November 1905 10	Tottenham Hotspur	2–3	Brentford	Tottenham, London
				Stadium: White Hart Lane

20 November 1905 11	Fulham	0–3	Tottenham Hotspur	Fulham, London
				Stadium: Craven Cottage

23 December 1905 12	Tottenham Hotspur	5–0	Southampton	Tottenham, London
				Stadium: White Hart Lane

29 January 1906 13	Tottenham Hotspur	1–2	Queens Park Rangers	Tottenham, London
				Stadium: White Hart Lane

19 February 1906 14	Millwall	1–1	Tottenham Hotspur	Isle of Dogs, London
				Stadium: North Greenwich

26 February 1906 15	Tottenham Hotspur	1–0	Brentford	Tottenham, London
				Stadium: White Hart Lane

3 March 1906 16	Tottenham Hotspur	1–1	Portsmouth	Tottenham, London
				Stadium: White Hart Lane

19 March 1906 17	Bristol Rovers	0–0	Tottenham Hotspur	Eastville, Bristol
		Report		Stadium: Eastville Stadium

21 March 1906 18	Plymouth Argyle	0–0	Tottenham Hotspur	Plymouth, Devon
				Stadium: Home Park

26 March 1906 19	West Ham United	0–1	Tottenham Hotspur	Upton Park, London
				Stadium: Boleyn Ground

25 April 1906 20	Tottenham Hotspur	0–1	Southampton	Tottenham, London
				Stadium: White Hart Lane

=== FA Cup ===
==== Results ====
13 January 1906 First round	Tottenham Hotspur	2–0	Burnley	Tottenham, London
	Woodward; Kyle			Stadium: White Hart Lane; Attendance: 20,000

3 February 1906 Second round	Tottenham Hotspur	3–2	Reading	Tottenham, London
	Bull; Walton; Kyle			Stadium: White Hart Lane; Attendance: 26,000

24 February 1906 Third round	Tottenham Hotspur	1–1	Birmingham	Tottenham, London
	Kyle			Stadium: White Hart Lane; Attendance: 28,000

28 February 1906 Third round reply	Birmingham	2–0	Tottenham Hotspur	Small Heath, Birmingham
				Stadium: Muntz Street; Attendance: 34,000

== Bibliography ==
- Soar, Phil (1995). Tottenham Hotspur The Official Illustrated History 1882–1995. Hamlyn. ISBN 0-600-58706-1.
- Goodwin, Bob (1992). The Spurs Alphabet. ACL & Polar Publishing (UK) Ltd. ISBN 0-9514862-8-4.
