= 1902–03 Tottenham Hotspur F.C. season =

English football club season

Tottenham Hotspur
1902–03 season
- Player-Manager: John Cameron
- Stadium: White Hart Lane
- Southern League: 4th
- Western League: 4th
- London League: 1st
- FA Cup: Third round

The 1902–03 season was Tottenham's seventh season as a fully professional club and the 20th year in existence. They competed in three leagues, the main being the Southern Football League along with the Western League and London League, along with the FA Cup.

Tottenham's only success was in the London League where they went on to win the trophy. All seasons after this one only the Tottenham reserves competed in the London League. In the FA Cup they made it to the third round and were drawn at home to Aston Villa but were knocked out after the match finished 3–2 in Villa's favour.

== Squad ==
Note: Flags indicate national team as defined under FIFA eligibility rules; some limited exceptions apply. Players may hold more than one non-FIFA nationality.

| Pos. | Nation | Player |
|---|---|---|
| GK | ENG | George Clawley |
| GK | ENG | Charlie Williams |
| DF | SCO | Charles Brown |
| DF | ENG | John Burton |
| DF | SCO | Harry Erentz |
| DF | SCO | Sandy Tait |
| DF | SCO | John Watson |
| MF | SCO | Willie Dryburgh |
| MF | SCO | Patrick Gilhooley |
| MF | ENG | Tom Morris |
| MF | NIR | Jack Kirwan |
| MF | SCO | James Chalmers |

| Pos. | Nation | Player |
|---|---|---|
| MF | SCO | James McNaught |
| MF | ENG | Alf Warner |
| MF | ENG | George Fredericks |
| MF | WAL | Ted Hughes |
| MF | WAL | John Leonard Jones |
| MF | ENG | John Thomas Jones |
| MF | ENG | Alan Haig-Brown |
| FW | ENG | Vivian Woodward |
| FW | SCO | Bob Houston |
| FW | SCO | David Copeland |
| FW | ENG | John Barlow |
| FW | SCO | John Cameron |

== Transfers ==
=== In ===
| Date from | Position | Nationality | Name | From | Fee | Ref. |
|---|---|---|---|---|---|---|
| 1902 | MF | (England) | John Thomas Jones | Bristol Rovers | Unknown | |
| April 1902 | MF | (England) | George Fredericks | Chelmsford | Unknown | (Note: Fredericks was signed on Vivian Woodward recommendation from their previous club. Fredericks only made two appearances for Spurs. One in the Southern League and one appearance in the Western League. He is recorded as having scored a single goal in the Western League. He was then released at the end of the season.) |
| May 1902 | FW | (Scotland) | Bob Houston | Heart of Midlothian | Unknown | |
| May 1902 | MF | (England) | Alf Warner | Notts County | Unknown | |
| May 1902 | DF | (Scotland) | John Watson | Everton | Unknown | |
| May 1902 | MF | (Scotland) | James Chalmers | Watford | Unknown | |
| May 1902 | GK | (England) | Charlie Williams | Free agent | Unknown | |
| December 1902 | MF | (Scotland) | Willie Dryburgh | Cowdenbeath | Unknown | |

== Competitions ==
=== Southern League ===
==== Table ====
| Pos | Team | Pld | W | D | L | GF | GA | GR | Pts |
|---|---|---|---|---|---|---|---|---|---|
| 2 | Reading | 30 | 19 | 7 | 4 | 72 | 30 | 2.400 | 45 |
| 3 | Portsmouth | 30 | 17 | 7 | 6 | 69 | 32 | 2.156 | 41 |
| 4 | Tottenham Hotspur | 30 | 14 | 7 | 9 | 47 | 31 | 1.516 | 35 |
| 5 | Bristol Rovers | 30 | 13 | 8 | 9 | 46 | 34 | 1.353 | 34 |
| 6 | New Brompton | 30 | 11 | 11 | 8 | 37 | 35 | 1.057 | 33 |

Source: rsssf.com
Rules for classification: The system of using goal average to separate two teams tied on points was used until the 1976-77 season. The points system: 2 points for a win, 1 point for a draw and 0 points for losing.

==== Results ====
| 6 September 1902 1 | Tottenham Hotspur | 0–0 | Queens Park Rangers | Tottenham, London |
| | | | | Stadium: White Hart Lane |

| 20 September 1902 2 | Tottenham Hotspur | 6–1 | Wellingborough | Tottenham, London |
| | | | | Stadium: White Hart Lane |

| 27 September 1902 3 | Bristol Rovers | 3–2 | Tottenham Hotspur | Eastville, Bristol |
| | | | | Stadium: Eastville Stadium |

| 4 October 1902 4 | Tottenham Hotspur | 2–0 | Northampton Town | Tottenham, London |
| | | | | Stadium: White Hart Lane |

| 11 October 1902 5 | Watford | 1–2 | Tottenham Hotspur | Watford, Hertfordshire |
| | | | | Stadium: Cassio Road |

| 18 October 1902 6 | Tottenham Hotspur | 3–1 | Brentford | Tottenham, London |
| | | | pen' Regan | Stadium: White Hart Lane |

| 25 October 1902 7 | Millwall | 2–0 | Tottenham Hotspur | Isle of Dogs, London |
| | | | | Stadium: North Greenwich |

| 1 November 1902 8 | Tottenham Hotspur | 1–1 | West Ham United | Tottenham, London |
| | | | | Stadium: White Hart Lane |

| 22 November 1902 9 | Tottenham Hotspur | 2–0 | Swindon Town | Tottenham, London |
| | | | | Stadium: White Hart Lane |

| 6 December 1902 10 | Tottenham Hotspur | 1–1 | Luton Town | Tottenham, London |
| | | | | Stadium: White Hart Lane |

| 20 December 1902 11 | Queens Park Rangers | 0–4 | Tottenham Hotspur | Kensal Green, London |
| | | | | Stadium: Kensal Rise Athletic Ground |

| 25 December 1902 12 | Tottenham Hotspur | 2–2 | Portsmouth | Tottenham, London |
| | Dryburgh | | | Stadium: White Hart Lane |

| 26 December 1902 13 | Southampton | 0–1 | Tottenham Hotspur | Southampton, Hampshire |
| | | | | Stadium: The Dell |

| 3 January 1903 14 | Wellingborough | 0–2 | Tottenham Hotspur | Wellingborough, Northamptonshire |
| | | | | Stadium: Dog & Duck Ground |

| 5 January 1903 15 | Tottenham Hotspur | 3–1 | New Brompton | Tottenham, London |
| | | | | Stadium: White Hart Lane |

| 10 January 1903 16 | Tottenham Hotspur | 3–0 | Bristol Rovers | Tottenham, London |
| | | | | Stadium: White Hart Lane |

| 17 January 1903 17 | Northampton Town | 3–1 | Tottenham Hotspur | Northampton, Northamptonshire |
| | | | | Stadium: County Cricket Ground |

| 24 January 1903 18 | Tottenham Hotspur | 1–1 | Watford | Tottenham, London |
| | | | | Stadium: White Hart Lane |

| 31 January 1903 19 | Brentford | 1–1 | Tottenham Hotspur | , London |
| | Warren | | | Stadium: York Road |

| 14 February 1903 20 | West Ham United | 1–0 | Tottenham Hotspur | Canning Town, London |
| | | | | Stadium: Memorial Grounds |

| 14 March 1903 21 | Tottenham Hotspur | 4–0 | Kettering Town | Tottenham, London |
| | | | | Stadium: White Hart Lane |

| 21 March 1903 22 | Luton Town | 3–0 | Tottenham Hotspur | Luton, Bedfordshire |
| | | | | Stadium: Dunstable Road |

| 28 March 1903 23 | Tottenham Hotspur | 2–0 | Reading | Tottenham, London |
| | | | | Stadium: White Hart Lane |

| 4 April 1903 24 | Reading | 0–0 | Tottenham Hotspur | Reading, Berkshire |
| | | | | Stadium: Elm Park |

| 10 April 1903 25 | Tottenham Hotspur | 2–1 | Southampton | Tottenham, London |
| | | | | Stadium: White Hart Lane |

| 11 April 1903 26 | New Brompton | 3–0 | Tottenham Hotspur | Gillingham, Kent |
| | | | | Stadium: Priestfield Stadium |

| 13 April 1903 27 | Portsmouth | 2–0 | Tottenham Hotspur | Portsmouth, Hampshire |
| | | | | Stadium: Fratton Park |

| 14 April 1903 28 | Tottenham Hotspur | 2–0 | Millwall | Tottenham, London |
| | | | | Stadium: White Hart Lane |

| 22 April 1903 29 | Swindon Town | 2–0 | Tottenham Hotspur | Swindon, Wiltshire |
| | | | | Stadium: County Ground |

| 25 April 1903 30 | Kettering Town | 1–0 | Tottenham Hotspur | Kettering, Northamptonshire |
| | | | | Stadium: Rockingham Road |

=== Western League ===
==== Table ====
| Pos | Team | Pld | W | D | L | GF | GA | GR | Pts | Result |
|---|---|---|---|---|---|---|---|---|---|---|
| 1 | Portsmouth | 16 | 10 | 4 | 2 | 34 | 14 | 2.429 | 24 | |
| 2 | Bristol Rovers | 16 | 9 | 2 | 5 | 36 | 22 | 1.636 | 20 | |
| 3 | Southampton | 16 | 7 | 6 | 3 | 32 | 20 | 1.600 | 20 | |
| 4 | Tottenham Hotspur | 16 | 6 | 7 | 3 | 20 | 14 | 1.429 | 19 | |
| 5 | Millwall Athletic | 16 | 6 | 3 | 7 | 23 | 29 | 0.793 | 15 | Left league at end of season |
| 6 | Reading | 16 | 7 | 0 | 9 | 20 | 21 | 0.952 | 14 | |
| 7 | Queens Park Rangers | 16 | 6 | 2 | 8 | 18 | 31 | 0.581 | 14 | |
| 8 | Brentford | 16 | 3 | 4 | 9 | 16 | 34 | 0.471 | 10 | |
| 9 | West Ham United | 16 | 2 | 4 | 10 | 15 | 29 | 0.517 | 8 | |

==== Results ====
| 13 September 1902 1 | Southampton | 1–1 | Tottenham Hotspur | Southampton, Hampshire |
| | | | | Stadium: The Dell |

| 15 September 1902 2 | Tottenham Hotspur | 4–3 | Millwall | Tottenham, London |
| | | | | Stadium: White Hart Lane |

| 22 September 1902 3 | Queens Park Rangers | 0–2 | Tottenham Hotspur | Kensal Green, London |
| | | | | Stadium: Kensal Rise Athletic Ground |

| 29 September 1902 4 | Tottenham Hotspur | 2–1 | Reading | Tottenham, London |
| | | | | Stadium: White Hart Lane |

| 13 October 1902 5 | Tottenham Hotspur | 0–1 | Bristol Rovers | Tottenham, London |
| | | | | Stadium: White Hart Lane |

| 29 October 1902 6 | Reading | 3–0 | Tottenham Hotspur | Reading, Berkshire |
| | | | | Stadium: Elm Park |

| 3 November 1902 7 | Tottenham Hotspur | 3–0 | Queens Park Rangers | Tottenham, London |
| | | | | Stadium: White Hart Lane |

| 8 November 1902 8 | Tottenham Hotspur | 0–0 | Portsmouth | Tottenham, London |
| | | | | Stadium: White Hart Lane |

| 29 November 1902 9 | Portsmouth | 2–2 | Tottenham Hotspur | Portsmouth, Hampshire |
| | | | | Stadium: Fratton Park |

| 27 December 1902 10 | Tottenham Hotspur | 0–0 | Southampton | Tottenham, London |
| | | | | Stadium: White Hart Lane |

| 28 January 1903 11 | Millwall | 1–1 | Tottenham Hotspur | Isle of Dogs, London |
| | | | | Stadium: North Greenwich |

| 16 February 1903 12 | Tottenham Hotspur | 1–0 | West Ham United | Tottenham, London |
| | | | | Stadium: White Hart Lane |

| 23 February 1903 13 | Bristol Rovers | 2–0 | Tottenham Hotspur | Eastville, Bristol |
| | | | | Stadium: Eastville Stadium |

| 10 March 1903 14 | Brentford | 0–0 | Tottenham Hotspur | London |
| | | | | Stadium: York Road |

| 19 March 1903 15 | West Ham United | 0–0 | Tottenham Hotspur | Canning Town, London |
| | | | | Stadium: Memorial Grounds |

| 26 March 1903 16 | Tottenham Hotspur | 4–0 | Brentford | Tottenham, London |
| | | | | Stadium: White Hart Lane |

=== London League ===
==== Table ====
| Pos | Club | P | W | D | L | F | A | Pts |
|---|---|---|---|---|---|---|---|---|
| 1 | Tottenham Hotspur | 10 | 7 | 1 | 2 | 19 | 4 | 15 |
| 2 | West Ham United | 10 | 5 | 3 | 2 | 15 | 13 | 13 |
| 3 | Woolwich Arsenal | 10 | 6 | 0 | 4 | 14 | 10 | 12 |
| 4 | Millwall | 10 | 3 | 4 | 3 | 18 | 14 | 10 |
| 5 | Queens Park Rangers | 10 | 2 | 3 | 5 | 9 | 15 | 7 |
| 6 | Brentford | 10 | 1 | 1 | 8 | 9 | 28 | 3 |

==== Results ====
| 6 October 1902 1 | Brentford | 1–5 | Tottenham Hotspur | London |
| | | | | Stadium: York Road |

| 20 October 1902 2 | West Ham United | 0–0 | Tottenham Hotspur | Canning Town, London |
| | | | | Stadium: Memorial Grounds |

| 17 November 1902 3 | Woolwich Arsenal | 2–1 | Tottenham Hotspur | Plumstead, London |
| | | | | Stadium: Manor Ground |

| 1 December 1902 4 | Tottenham Hotspur | 1–0 | Woolwich Arsenal | Tottenham, London |
| | | | | Stadium: White Hart Lane |

| 15 December 1902 5 | Tottenham Hotspur | 4–0 | West Ham United | Tottenham, London |
| | | | | Stadium: White Hart Lane |

| 12 January 1903 6 | Tottenham Hotspur | 1–0 | Brentford | Tottenham, London |
| | | | | Stadium: White Hart Lane |

| 2 March 1903 7 | Millwall | 0–3 | Tottenham Hotspur | Isle of Dogs, London |
| | | | | Stadium: North Greenwich |

| 16 March 1903 8 | Queens Park Rangers | 1–0 | Tottenham Hotspur | Kensal Green, London |
| | | | | Stadium: Kensal Rise Athletic Ground |

| 23 March 1903 9 | Tottenham Hotspur | 1–0 | Millwall | Tottenham, London |
| | | | | Stadium: White Hart Lane |

| 30 March 1903 10 | Tottenham Hotspur | 1–0 | Queens Park Rangers | Tottenham, London |
| | | | | Stadium: White Hart Lane |

=== FA Cup ===
==== Results ====
| 7 February 1903 First round | Tottenham Hotspur | 0–0 | West Bromwich Albion | Tottenham, London |
| | | | | Stadium: White Hart Lane; Attendance: 25,641 |

| 11 February 1903 First round replay | West Bromwich Albion | 0–2 | Tottenham Hotspur | West Bromwich, West Midlands |
| | | | pen' Dryburgh; Woodward | Stadium: The Hawthorns; Attendance: 35,000 |

| 21 February 1903 Second round | Tottenham Hotspur | 1–0 | Bristol City | Tottenham, London |
| | Woodward | | | Stadium: White Hart Lane; Attendance: 18,750 |

| 7 March 1903 Third round | Tottenham Hotspur | 2–3 | Aston Villa | Tottenham, London |
| | Woodward; Copeland | | | Stadium: White Hart Lane; Attendance: 24,500 |

== Bibliography ==
- Soar, Phil (1995). Tottenham Hotspur The Official Illustrated History 1882–1995. Hamlyn. ISBN 0-600-58706-1.
- Goodwin, Bob (1992). The Spurs Alphabet. ACL & Polar Publishing (UK) Ltd. ISBN 0-9514862-8-4.
