= 1904–05 Tottenham Hotspur F.C. season =

English football club season

Tottenham Hotspur
1904–05 season
- Stadium: White Hart Lane
- Southern League: 5th
- Western League: 8th
- FA Cup: Second round
- Top goalscorer: Alex Glen (11)

The 1904–05 season was Tottenham's ninth season as a fully professional club and the 22nd year in existence. They competed in two leagues, the main being the Southern Football League with a midweek game in the Western League along with competing in the FA Cup.

In the Southern League Tottenham had an inconsistent season but did enough to finish the season in fifth place. There were two standout games that occurred in December, beating first Swindon Town 6–3 and then thumping Wellingborough 8–1.

In the Western League campaign Tottenham won their first three games but after that their form dropped and they only managed two more wins in the season. As seasons end they were in eighth place.

In the FA Cup Tottenham were drawn away against Middlesbrough in the first round. The first match was a 1–1 draw and required a reply at White Hart Lane which Spurs won 1–0. In the next round Tottenham were drawn in a home tie against Newcastle United. This also finished in a 1–1 draw and in the reply at Newcastle they lost 4–0.

== Squad ==
Note: Flags indicate national team as defined under FIFA eligibility rules; some limited exceptions apply. Players may hold more than one non-FIFA nationality.

Pos.	Nation	Player
GK	ENG	Charlie Williams
GK	ENG	Jack Eggett
DF	ENG	Jimmy Freeborough
DF	ENG	John George
DF	SCO	William McCurdy
DF	SCO	John Watson
DF	ENG	John Burton
DF	ENG	Walter Bull
DF	SCO	Sandy Tait
MF	SCO	Alex Glen
MF	IRL	Charles O'Hagan
MF	WAL	Ted Hughes
MF	NIR	Jack Kirwan

Pos.	Nation	Player
MF	SCO	James McNaught
MF	SCO	William Murray
MF	ENG	Tom Morris
MF	ENG	Alf Warner
FW	ENG	John Brearley
FW	ENG	Harold Stansfield
FW	ENG	Herbert Chapman
FW	SCO	Andrew Swann
FW	ENG	Joe Walton
FW	ENG	William Berry
FW	SCO	David Copeland
FW	ENG	Vivian Woodward

== Transfers ==
=== In ===
Date from	Position	Nationality	Name	From	Fee	Ref.
1904	DF	(England)	Jimmy Freeborough	Stockport County	Unknown	
1904	FW	(England)	Harold Stansfield	Stockport County	Unknown	
April 1904	DF	(England)	John George	Kettering Town	Unknown	(Note: John Spencer George was with Tottenham for one season making a total of 16 appearances and scoring one goal.)
May 1904	MF	(Scotland)	Alex Glen	Notts County	Unknown	
May 1904	MF	(Republic of Ireland)	Charles O'Hagan	Everton	Unknown	
May 1904	DF	(England)	Walter Bull	Notts County	Unknown	
May 1904	GK	(England)	Jack Eggett	West Ham United	Unknown	
May 1904	DF	(Scotland)	William McCurdy	New Brompton	Unknown	
May 1904	FW	(Scotland)	Andrew Swann	Mexborough	Unknown	
March 1905	FW	(England)	Herbert Chapman	Notts County	£70	

== Competitions ==
=== Southern League ===
==== Table ====
Pos	Team	Pld	W	D	L	GF	GA	GR	Pts
3	Southampton	34	18	7	9	54	40	1.350	43
4	Plymouth Argyle	34	18	5	11	57	39	1.462	41
5	Tottenham Hotspur	34	15	8	11	53	34	1.559	38
6	Fulham	34	14	10	10	46	34	1.353	38
7	Queens Park Rangers	34	14	8	12	51	46	1.109	36

Rules for classification: The system of using goal average to separate two teams tied on points was used up until the 1976–77 season. The points system: 2 points for a win, 1 point for a draw and 0 points for losing.

==== Results ====
3 September 1904 1	Tottenham Hotspur	0–1	Fulham	Tottenham, London
				Stadium: White Hart Lane

10 September 1904 2	Watford	0–1	Tottenham Hotspur	Watford, Hertfordshire
				Stadium: Cassio Road

17 September 1904 3	Tottenham Hotspur	2–0	Plymouth Argyle	Tottenham, London
				Stadium: White Hart Lane

24 September 1904 4	West Ham United	0–0	Tottenham Hotspur	Upton Park, London
				Stadium: Boleyn Ground

1 October 1904 5	Tottenham Hotspur	1–3	Reading	Tottenham, London
				Stadium: White Hart Lane

8 October 1904 6	Bristol Rovers	3–1	Tottenham Hotspur	Eastville, Bristol
				Stadium: Eastville Stadium

15 October 1904 7	Tottenham Hotspur	0–1	Northampton Town	Tottenham, London
				Stadium: White Hart Lane

29 October 1904 8	Tottenham Hotspur	1–1	Brentford	Tottenham, London
			Shanks	Stadium: White Hart Lane

5 November 1904 9	Queens Park Rangers	1–2	Tottenham Hotspur	Park Royal, London
				Stadium: Royal Agricultural Society showgrounds

12 November 1904 10	Tottenham Hotspur	1–0	Millwall Athletic	Tottenham, London
				Stadium: White Hart Lane

19 November 1904 11	Brighton & Hove Albion	1–1	Tottenham Hotspur	Hove, East Sussex
				Stadium: Goldstone Ground

26 November 1904 12	Luton Town	1–0	Tottenham Hotspur	Luton, Bedfordshire
				Stadium: Dunstable Road

3 December 1904 13	Tottenham Hotspur	6–3	Swindon Town	Tottenham, London
				Stadium: White Hart Lane

10 December 1904 14	New Brompton	1–1	Tottenham Hotspur	Gillingham, Kent
				Stadium: Priestfield Stadium

17 December 1904 15	Tottenham Hotspur	8–1	Wellingborough	Tottenham, London
				Stadium: White Hart Lane

26 December 1904 16	Southampton	1–1	Tottenham Hotspur	Southampton, Hampshire
				Stadium: The Dell

27 December 1904 17	Tottenham Hotspur	1–1	Portsmouth	Tottenham, London
				Stadium: White Hart Lane

31 December 1904 18	Fulham	1–0	Tottenham Hotspur	Fulham, London
				Stadium: Craven Cottage

7 January 1905 19	Tottenham Hotspur	2–0	Watford	Tottenham, London
				Stadium: White Hart Lane

21 January 1905 20	Tottenham Hotspur	1–0	West Ham United	Tottenham, London
				Stadium: White Hart Lane

28 January 1905 21	Reading	3–2	Tottenham Hotspur	Reading, Berkshire
				Stadium: Elm Park

11 February 1905 22	Northampton Town	0–3	Tottenham Hotspur	Northampton, Northamptonshire
				Stadium: County Cricket Ground

25 February 1905 23	Brentford	0–0	Tottenham Hotspur	Brentford, London
				Stadium: Griffin Park

4 March 1905 24	Tottenham Hotspur	5–1	Queens Park Rangers	Tottenham, London
				Stadium: White Hart Lane

11 March 1905 25	Millwall Athletic	0–2	Tottenham Hotspur	Isle of Dogs, London
				Stadium: North Greenwich

18 March 1905 26	Tottenham Hotspur	1–1	Brighton & Hove Albion	Tottenham, London
				Stadium: White Hart Lane

25 March 1905 27	Tottenham Hotspur	1–0	Luton Town	Tottenham, London
				Stadium: White Hart Lane

1 April 1905 28	Swindon Town	2–1	Tottenham Hotspur	Swindon, Wiltshire
				Stadium: County Ground

5 April 1905 29	Plymouth Argyle	2–1	Tottenham Hotspur	Plymouth, Devon
				Stadium: Home Park

8 April 1905 30	Tottenham Hotspur	2–0	New Brompton	Tottenham, London
				Stadium: White Hart Lane

15 April 1905 31	Tottenham Hotspur	1–0	Wellingborough	Tottenham, London
				Stadium: White Hart Lane

21 April 1905 32	Tottenham Hotspur	1–2	Southampton	Tottenham, London
				Stadium: White Hart Lane

24 April 1905 33	Portsmouth	3–2	Tottenham Hotspur	Portsmouth, Hampshire
				Stadium: Fratton Park

29 April 1905 34	Tottenham Hotspur	1–0	Bristol Rovers	Tottenham, London
				Stadium: White Hart Lane

=== Western League ===
==== Table ====
Pos	Team	Pld	W	D	L	GF	GA	GR	Pts
1	Plymouth Argyle	20	13	4	3	52	18	2.889	30
2	Brentford	20	11	6	3	30	22	1.364	28
3	Southampton	20	11	2	7	45	22	2.045	24
4	Portsmouth	20	10	3	7	29	30	0.967	23
5	West Ham United	20	8	4	8	37	42	0.881	20
6	Fulham	20	7	3	10	29	32	0.906	17
7	Millwall	20	7	3	10	32	40	0.800	17
8	Tottenham Hotspur	20	5	6	9	20	28	0.714	16
9	Reading	20	6	3	11	27	37	0.730	15
10	Bristol Rovers	20	7	1	12	32	44	0.727	15
11	Queens Park Rangers	20	6	3	11	27	45	0.600	15

==== Results ====
7 September 1904 1	Reading	0–1	Tottenham Hotspur	Reading, Berkshire
				Stadium: Elm Park

19 September 1904 2	Tottenham Hotspur	4–1	Queens Park Rangers	Tottenham, London
				Stadium: White Hart Lane

26 September 1904 3	Tottenham Hotspur	1–0	Bristol Rovers	Tottenham, London
				Stadium: White Hart Lane

3 October 1904 4	Millwall Athletic	3–2	Tottenham Hotspur	Isle of Dogs, London
				Stadium: North Greenwich

19 October 1904 5	Plymouth Argyle	5–0	Tottenham Hotspur	Plymouth, Devon
				Stadium: Home Park

22 October 1904 6	Portsmouth	1–0	Tottenham Hotspur	Portsmouth, Hampshire
				Stadium: Fratton Park

22 October 1904 7	Tottenham Hotspur	0–1	West Ham United	Tottenham, London
				Stadium: White Hart Lane

7 November 1904 8	Tottenham Hotspur	2–2	Reading	Tottenham, London
				Stadium: White Hart Lane

12 November 1904 9	Fulham	0–0 (Note: Two games were played on 12 November 1904, the first team played in the Southern League against Millwall, while the reverses played Fulham in the Western League.)	Tottenham Hotspur	Fulham, London
				Stadium: Craven Cottage

21 November 1904 10	Tottenham Hotspur	2–0	Plymouth Argyle	Tottenham, London
				Stadium: White Hart Lane

2 January 1905 11	Tottenham Hotspur	0–5	Fulham	Tottenham, London
				Stadium: White Hart Lane

27 February 1905 12	Tottenham Hotspur	5–1	Millwall Athletic	Tottenham, London
				Stadium: White Hart Lane

6 March 1905 13	Bristol Rovers	2–1	Tottenham Hotspur	Eastville, Bristol
				Stadium: Eastville Stadium

20 March 1905 14	Queens Park Rangers	1–1	Tottenham Hotspur	Park Royal, London
				Stadium: Royal Agricultural Society showgrounds

27 March 1905 15	West Ham United	1–1	Tottenham Hotspur	Upton Park, London
				Stadium: Boleyn Ground

29 March 1905 16	Tottenham Hotspur	1–1	Southampton	Tottenham, London
				Stadium: White Hart Lane

3 April 1905 17	Brentford	2–0	Tottenham Hotspur	Brentford, London
				Stadium: Griffin Park

11 April 1905 18	Tottenham Hotspur	0–0	Brentford	Tottenham, London
				Stadium: White Hart Lane

17 April 1905 19	Tottenham Hotspur	0–1	Portsmouth	Tottenham, London
				Stadium: White Hart Lane

22 April 1905 20	Southampton	1–0	Tottenham Hotspur	Southampton, Hampshire
				Stadium: The Dell

=== FA Cup ===
==== Results ====
4 February 1905 First round	Middlesbrough	1–1	Tottenham Hotspur	Middlesbrough, North Yorkshire
			Glen	Stadium: Ayresome Park; Attendance: 25,000

9 February 1905 First round reply	Tottenham Hotspur	1–0	Middlesbrough	Tottenham, London
	O'Hagan			Stadium: White Hart Lane; Attendance: 18,000

18 February 1905 Second round	Tottenham Hotspur	1–1	Newcastle United	Tottenham, London
	Walton			Stadium: White Hart Lane; Attendance: 19,013

22 February 1905 Second round reply	Newcastle United	4–0	Tottenham Hotspur	Newcastle upon Tyne
				Stadium: St James' Park; Attendance: 26,755

== Bibliography ==
- Soar, Phil (1995). Tottenham Hotspur The Official Illustrated History 1882–1995. Hamlyn. ISBN 0-600-58706-1.
- Goodwin, Bob (1992). The Spurs Alphabet. ACL & Polar Publishing (UK) Ltd. ISBN 0-9514862-8-4.
