= 1903–04 Tottenham Hotspur F.C. season =

English football club season

Tottenham Hotspur
1903–04 season
- Stadium: White Hart Lane
- Southern League: 2nd
- Western League: Winners
- FA Cup: Third round
- Top goalscorer: Jack Jones (15)
- Biggest win: 7–4 vs Reading, 30 January 1904, Southern League

The 1903–04 season was Tottenham's eighth season as a fully professional club and the 21st year in existence. They competed in two leagues, the main being the Southern Football League with a midweek game in the Western League along with competing in the FA Cup.

In the Southern League Tottenham began the season poorly and didn't manage a win until 10 October when they came up against Wellingborough. There was a bit of improvement in November, but the form took a drop in December. After the turn of the year Tottenham improved dramatically and were unbeaten in 12 games. This included a remarkable 7–4 home game against Reading. It wasn't till April when Tottenham went away to Portsmouth they lost 1–0. This was Spurs only loss in the second half of the season and they rose up the table to finish in second place.

The campaign in the Western League was a very successful one as Tottenham only lost twice all season. Those two losses were away games to Queens Park Rangers and Southampton. After winning 11 games, and drawing three they were crowned champions.

In the FA Cup they progressed past Everton in the first round winning 2–1. In the second round they were drawn at home to play Aston Villa. During that game with the Villa being 1–0 up, there was crowd trouble that occurred that escalated into a pitch invasion and the match was abandoned after 38 minutes. The FA fined the club £350 and ordered the match to be replayed at Villa Park. Tottenham managed to overcome Villa winning 1–0 with a goal from Jack Jones. The next round was a draw against The Wednesday (now Sheffield Wednesday). The first match was a home tie which finished 1–1 and needed a replay. At Hillsborough Spurs lost 2–0 and were kicked out of the cup.

== Squad ==
Note: Flags indicate national team as defined under FIFA eligibility rules; some limited exceptions apply. Players may hold more than one non-FIFA nationality.

Pos.	Nation	Player
GK	ENG	Charlie Williams
GK	ENG	Frederick Mearns
DF	SCO	Charles Brown
DF	ENG	John Burton
DF	SCO	John Watson
DF	ENG	Harold Milton
DF	ENG	Percy Mapley
DF	SCO	Sandy Tait
DF	ENG	Oliver Burton
DF	SCO	Harry Erentz
MF	SCO	Patrick Gilhooley
MF	WAL	Ted Hughes
MF	NIR	Jack Kirwan
MF	SCO	James McNaught

Pos.	Nation	Player
MF	ENG	Archie Turner
MF	ENG	Alf Warner
MF	SCO	John McConnachie
MF	IRL	David Quinn
MF	ENG	Tom Morris
MF	SCO	James Chalmers
MF	WAL	Jack Jones
MF	ENG	John Jones
FW	ENG	Joe Walton
FW	ENG	John Brearley
FW	ENG	William Berry
FW	SCO	David Copeland
FW	ENG	Vivian Woodward
	ENG	Allan Leach-Lewis

== Transfers ==
=== In ===
Date from	Position	Nationality	Name	From	Fee	Ref.
May 1903	FW	(England)	John Brearley	Everton	Unknown	
May 1903	FW	(England)	Joe Walton	Preston North End	Unknown	
Jan 1904	MF	(England)	Archie Turner	Newcastle United	Unknown	
Feb 1904	DF	(England)	Harold Milton	New Crusaders	Amateur contract	(Note: Harold Aubrey Milton signed an amateur contract with Spurs and recorded only four games with the club. His debut game was a Western League game against Brentford which Tottenham won 2–1.)
Feb 1904	DF	(England)	Percy Mapley	West Ham United	Unknown	
March 1904	Unknown	(England)	Allan Leach-Lewis	Cambridge University	Amateur contract	(Note: Leach-Lewis signed an amateur contract and only played two Southern League games for Tottenham. His debut against Luton Town and one more game against Portsmouth. He had one other recorded friendly appearance before leaving the club.)

== Competitions ==
=== Southern League ===
==== Table ====
Pos	Team	Pld	W	D	L	GF	GA	GR	Pts
1	Southampton	34	22	6	6	75	30	2.500	50
2	Tottenham Hotspur	34	16	11	7	54	37	1.459	43
3	Bristol Rovers	34	17	8	9	64	42	1.524	42
4	Portsmouth	34	17	8	9	41	38	1.079	42
5	Queens Park Rangers	34	15	11	8	53	37	1.432	41

Source: rsssf.com
Rules for classification: The system of using goal average to separate two teams tied on points was used until the 1976-77 season. The points system: 2 points for a win, 1 point for a draw and 0 points for losing.

==== Results ====
5 September 1903 1	Fulham	0–0	Tottenham Hotspur	Fulham, London
				Stadium: Craven Cottage

12 September 1903 2	Tottenham Hotspur	0–1	Millwall	Tottenham, London
				Stadium: White Hart Lane

14 September 1903 3	Brentford	0–0	Tottenham Hotspur	London
				Stadium: York Road

19 September 1903 4	Queens Park Rangers	2–0	Tottenham Hotspur	Kensal Green, London
				Stadium: Kensal Rise Athletic Ground

26 September 1903 5	Tottenham Hotspur	0–2	Plymouth Argyle	Tottenham, London
			Anderson; Leech	Stadium: White Hart Lane; Attendance: 17,000

3 October 1903 6	Reading	2–2	Tottenham Hotspur	Reading, Berkshire
				Stadium: Elm Park

10 October 1903 7	Tottenham Hotspur	1–0	Wellingborough	Tottenham, London
				Stadium: White Hart Lane

17 October 1903 8	Bristol Rovers	1–0	Tottenham Hotspur	Eastville, Bristol
				Stadium: Eastville Stadium

24 October 1903 9	Tottenham Hotspur	2–2	Brighton & Hove Albion	Tottenham, London
				Stadium: White Hart Lane

7 November 1903 10	Tottenham Hotspur	2–1	Northampton Town	Tottenham, London
				Stadium: White Hart Lane

21 November 1903 11	Tottenham Hotspur	2–1	West Ham United	Tottenham, London
				Stadium: White Hart Lane

5 December 1903 12	Luton Town	3–2	Tottenham Hotspur	Luton, Bedfordshire
				Stadium: Dunstable Road

19 December 1903 13	Kettering Town	3–3	Tottenham Hotspur	Kettering, Northamptonshire
				Stadium: Rockingham Road

25 December 1903 14	Tottenham Hotspur	1–1	Portsmouth	Tottenham, London
				Stadium: White Hart Lane

26 December 1903 15	Southampton	1–0	Tottenham Hotspur	Southampton, Hampshire
				Stadium: The Dell

2 January 1904 16	Tottenham Hotspur	1–0	Fulham	Tottenham, London
				Stadium: White Hart Lane

9 January 1904 17	Millwall	0–1	Tottenham Hotspur	Isle of Dogs, London
				Stadium: North Greenwich

16 January 1904 18	Tottenham Hotspur	2–2	Queens Park Rangers	Tottenham, London
				Stadium: White Hart Lane

23 January 1904 19	Plymouth Argyle	1–3	Tottenham Hotspur	Plymouth, Devon
				Stadium: Home Park

30 January 1904 20	Tottenham Hotspur	7–4	Reading	Tottenham, London
				Stadium: White Hart Lane

13 February 1904 21	Tottenham Hotspur	5–1	Bristol Rovers	Tottenham, London
				Stadium: White Hart Lane

22 February 1904 22	Tottenham Hotspur	1–0	Swindon Town	Tottenham, London
				Stadium: White Hart Lane

12 March 1904 23	Tottenham Hotspur	1–1	Brentford	Tottenham, London
			Buchanan	Stadium: White Hart Lane

19 March 1904 24	West Ham United	0–2	Tottenham Hotspur	Canning Town, London
				Stadium: Memorial Grounds

26 March 1904 25	Swindon Town	0–0	Tottenham Hotspur	Swindon, Wiltshire
				Stadium: County Ground

1 April 1904 26	Tottenham Hotspur	2–1	Southampton	Tottenham, London
				Stadium: White Hart Lane

2 April 1904 27	Tottenham Hotspur	1–1	Luton Town	Tottenham, London
				Stadium: White Hart Lane

4 April 1904 28	Portsmouth	1–0	Tottenham Hotspur	Portsmouth, Hampshire
				Stadium: Fratton Park

5 April 1904 29	Tottenham Hotspur	1–0	New Brompton	Tottenham, London
				Stadium: White Hart Lane

9 April 1904 30	New Brompton	0–1	Tottenham Hotspur	Gillingham, Kent
				Stadium: Priestfield Stadium

13 April 1904 31	Brighton & Hove Albion	1–2	Tottenham Hotspur	Brighton, East Sussex
				Stadium: Goldstone Ground

16 April 1904 32	Tottenham Hotspur	5–1	Kettering Town	Tottenham, London
				Stadium: White Hart Lane

25 April 1904 33	Northampton Town	0–1	Tottenham Hotspur	Northampton, Northamptonshire
				Stadium: County Cricket Ground

30 April 1904 34	Wellingborough	3–3	Tottenham Hotspur	Wellingborough, Northamptonshire
				Stadium: London Road

=== Western League ===
==== Table ====
Pos	Team	Pld	W	D	L	GF	GA	GR	Pts
1	Tottenham Hotspur	16	11	3	2	32	12	2.667	25
2	Southampton	16	9	3	4	30	18	1.667	21
3	Plymouth Argyle	16	8	4	4	23	19	1.211	20
4	Portsmouth	16	7	2	7	24	22	1.091	16
5	Brentford	16	6	4	6	19	23	0.826	16
6	Queens Park Rangers	16	5	5	6	15	21	0.714	15
7	Reading	16	4	4	8	16	26	0.615	12
8	Bristol Rovers	16	4	3	9	29	29	1.000	11
9	West Ham United	16	2	4	10	13	31	0.419	8

==== Results ====
7 September 1903 1	Tottenham Hotspur	3–1	Reading	Tottenham, London
				Stadium: White Hart Lane

5 October 1903 2	Tottenham Hotspur	3–0	Queens Park Rangers	Tottenham, London
				Stadium: White Hart Lane

14 October 1903 3	Reading	0–2	Tottenham Hotspur	Reading, Berkshire
				Stadium: Elm Park

31 October 1903 4	Portsmouth	0–3	Tottenham Hotspur	Portsmouth, Hampshire
				Stadium: Fratton Park

2 November 1903 5	Tottenham Hotspur	1–1	Brentford	Tottenham, London
				Stadium: White Hart Lane

9 November 1903 6	Queens Park Rangers	2–0	Tottenham Hotspur	Kensal Green, London
				Stadium: Kensal Rise Athletic Ground

30 November 1903 7	Tottenham Hotspur	2–1	Bristol Rovers	Tottenham, London
				Stadium: White Hart Lane

14 December 1903 8	Tottenham Hotspur	4–1	West Ham United	Tottenham, London
				Stadium: White Hart Lane

28 December 1903 9	Tottenham Hotspur	1–0	Southampton	Tottenham, London
				Stadium: White Hart Lane

27 February 1904 10	Tottenham Hotspur	1–1	Portsmouth	Tottenham, London
				Stadium: White Hart Lane

29 February 1904 11	Tottenham Hotspur	5–1	Plymouth Argyle	Tottenham, London
			Fitchett	Stadium: White Hart Lane

28 March 1904 12	Brentford	1–2	Tottenham Hotspur	, London
				Stadium: York Road

18 April 1904 13	West Ham United	0–1	Tottenham Hotspur	Canning Town, London
				Stadium: Memorial Grounds

20 April 1904 14	Plymouth Argyle	0–0	Tottenham Hotspur	Plymouth, Devon
				Stadium: Home Park

23 April 1904 15	Southampton	1–0	Tottenham Hotspur	Southampton, Hampshire
				Stadium: The Dell

27 April 1904 16	Bristol Rovers	2–4	Tottenham Hotspur	Eastville, Bristol
				Stadium: Eastville Stadium

=== FA Cup ===
==== Results ====
6 February 1904 First round	Everton	1–2	Tottenham Hotspur	Liverpool
			Woodward og' Balmer	Stadium: Goodison Park; Attendance: 25,000

20 February 1904 Second round	Tottenham Hotspur	0–1; Game abandoned after the 38th minute after crowd trouble.	Aston Villa	Tottenham, London
				Stadium: White Hart Lane; Attendance: 32,000

25 February 1904 Second round reply	Aston Villa	0–1	Tottenham Hotspur	Aston, Birmingham
			Jones	Stadium: Villa Park; Attendance: 30,000

5 March 1904 Third round	Tottenham Hotspur	1–1	The Wednesday	Tottenham, London
	Jones			Stadium: White Hart Lane; Attendance: 15,500

22 March 1904 Third round reply	The Wednesday	2–0	Tottenham Hotspur	Sheffield, Yorkshire
				Stadium: Hillsborough Stadium; Attendance: 31,000

== Bibliography ==
- Soar, Phil (1995). Tottenham Hotspur The Official Illustrated History 1882–1995. Hamlyn. ISBN 0-600-58706-1.
- Goodwin, Bob (1992). The Spurs Alphabet. ACL & Polar Publishing (UK) Ltd. ISBN 0-9514862-8-4.
