= 1906–07 Tottenham Hotspur F.C. season =

English football club season

Tottenham Hotspur
1906–07 season
- Manager: John Cameron
- Stadium: White Hart Lane
- Southern League: 6th
- Western League: 4th
- FA Cup: Third round
- Top goalscorer: James Reid (16)

The 1906–07 season was Tottenham's eleventh season as a fully professional club and the 24th year in existence. They competed in two leagues, the main being the Southern Football League with a midweek game in the Western League along with competing in the FA Cup.

Unlike the previous season the Western League was split into two groups and Tottenham played in the "B" league consisting of sixth teams and finished in fourth place.

In the Southern League Tottenham did enough to finish in the top half of the table with a notable 6–0 win against Northampton Town. On 12 December they played Plymouth Argyle in both the Southern and Western League on the same day. The first team went away to Plymouth and drew the game 2–2. While the reserves played at White Hart Lane in a game that finished 4–2 in Tottenham's favour.

In the FA Cup it took three games to get past Hull City and the same again to get past Blackburn Rovers. Then in the third round Tottenham were drawn away to Notts County, in Nottingham Spurs lost 4–0 ending their cup run.

== Squad ==
Note: Flags indicate national team as defined under FIFA eligibility rules; some limited exceptions apply. Players may hold more than one non-FIFA nationality.

Pos.	Nation	Player
GK	ENG	Jack Eggett
GK	IRL	Matthew Reilly
GK	ENG	John Whitbourne
DF	ENG	Walter Bull
DF	ENG	Oliver Burton
DF	ENG	Jabez Darnell
DF	SCO	Danny Steel
DF	ENG	John Wilkinson
DF	SCO	Sandy Tait
DF	SCO	Frank McDiarmid
DF	SCO	John Watson
DF	SCO	Jack Chaplin
MF	ENG	William Jones
MF	WAL	Ted Hughes
MF	ENG	Alfred Whyman

Pos.	Nation	Player
MF		William Dow
MF	SCO	George Badenoch
MF	ENG	Tom Morris
MF	ENG	Robert Walker
FW	ENG	Arthur Pickett
FW	ENG	Harold Stansfield
FW	ENG	John Brearley
FW	ENG	William Berry
FW	ENG	Herbert Chapman
FW	ENG	Charlie Hewitt
FW	ENG	Walter Eames
FW	SCO	James Reid
FW	ENG	Joe Walton
FW	ENG	Vivian Woodward
FW	ENG	George Payne

== Transfers ==
May 1906 saw the arrival of multiple players to Tottenham, three from Watford, two from Middlesbrough and William Jones who had spent nine years at Bristol City with an England call-up during that time in March 1901 where he played against Ireland. His final season with Bristol was when they had won the Second Division, however they released him from his services at seasons end. In October Tottenham gave a trail to Irish international goalkeeper Matthew Reilly and were impressed and signed him for a year.

=== In ===
Date from	Position	Nationality	Name	From	Fee	Ref.
1906	DF	(Scotland)	Frank McDiarmid	Dundee	Unknown	
May 1906	FW	(Scotland)	James Reid	Watford	Unknown	
May 1906	MF	(Scotland)	George Badenoch	Watford	Unknown	(Note: George Badenoch only made three appearances for Spurs. His debut was against his previous club Watford, one Western League game and one recorded other. He was then released at the end of the season.)
May 1906	MF		William Dow	Bury	Unknown	
May 1906	FW	(England)	Robert Walker	Middlesbrough	Unknown	
May 1906	FW	(England)	Walter Eames	Watford	Unknown	
May 1906	FW	(England)	Charlie Hewitt	Middlesbrough	Unknown	
May 1906	DF	(England)	William Jones	Bristol City	Free	
May 1906	FW	(England)	Arthur Pickett	Workington	Unknown	
May 1906	DF	(Scotland)	Danny Steel	Rangers	Unknown	
May 1906	DF	(England)	John Wilkinson	Notts County	Unknown	(Note: John Wilkinson came to Tottenham on a recommendation but only played two competitive games. His debut against Luton Town in the Southern League which Tottenham lost at home 2–1 and one other game.)
October 1906	GK	(Republic of Ireland)	Matthew Reilly		Free	
November 1906	FW	(England)	George Payne	Barnet Alston	Unknown	

== Competitions ==
=== Southern League ===
==== Table ====
Pos	Team	Pld	W	D	L	GF	GA	GR	Pts
4	Luton Town	38	18	9	11	52	52	1.000	45
5	West Ham United	38	15	14	9	60	41	1.463	44
6	Tottenham Hotspur	38	17	9	12	63	45	1.400	43
7	Millwall	38	18	6	14	71	50	1.420	42
8	Norwich City	38	15	12	11	57	48	1.188	42

Rules for classification: The system of using goal average to separate two teams tied on points was used until the 1976-77 season. The points system: 2 points for a win, 1 point for a draw and 0 points for losing.

==== Results ====
1 September 1906 1	Tottenham Hotspur	1–2	West Ham United	Tottenham, London
				Stadium: White Hart Lane

5 September 1906 2	Watford	1–1	Tottenham Hotspur	Watford, Hertfordshire
				Stadium: Cassio Road

8 September 1906 3	Bristol Rovers	3–2	Tottenham Hotspur	Eastville, Bristol
				Stadium: Eastville Stadium

15 September 1906 4	Swindon Town	0–0	Tottenham Hotspur	Swindon, Wiltshire
				Stadium: County Ground

22 September 1906 5	Tottenham Hotspur	2–2	Norwich City	Tottenham, London
				Stadium: White Hart Lane

24 September 1906 6	Tottenham Hotspur	5–1	Fulham	Tottenham, London
				Stadium: White Hart Lane

29 September 1906 7	Luton Town	2–0	Tottenham Hotspur	Luton, Bedfordshire
				Stadium: Kenilworth Road

6 October 1906 8	Tottenham Hotspur	3–0	Crystal Palace	Tottenham, London
				Stadium: White Hart Lane

13 October 1906 9	Brentford	2–2	Tottenham Hotspur	Brentford, London
	Greaves; Underwood			Stadium: Griffin Park

27 October 1906 10	Leyton	1–1	Tottenham Hotspur	Leyton, London
				Stadium: Brisbane Road

29 October 1906 11	Fulham	2–1	Tottenham Hotspur	Fulham, London
				Stadium: Craven Cottage

3 November 1906 12	Tottenham Hotspur	1–1	Portsmouth	Tottenham, London
				Stadium: White Hart Lane

10 November 1906 13	New Brompton	0–1	Tottenham Hotspur	Gillingham, Kent
				Stadium: Priestfield Stadium

24 November 1906 14	Brighton & Hove Albion	2–0	Tottenham Hotspur	Hove, East Sussex
				Stadium: Goldstone Ground

1 December 1906 15	Tottenham Hotspur	2–0	Reading	Tottenham, London
				Stadium: White Hart Lane

12 December 1906 16	Tottenham Hotspur	4–2	Plymouth Argyle	Tottenham, London
				Stadium: White Hart Lane

15 December 1906 17	Tottenham Hotspur	6–0	Northampton Town	Tottenham, London
				Stadium: White Hart Lane

22 December 1906 18	Queens Park Rangers	3–1	Tottenham Hotspur	Park Royal, London
				Stadium: Royal Agricultural Society show grounds

25 December 1906 19	Tottenham Hotspur	3–1	Millwall	Tottenham, London
				Stadium: White Hart Lane

26 December 1906 20	Southampton	2–1	Tottenham Hotspur	Southampton, Hampshire
				Stadium: The Dell

29 December 1906 21	West Ham United	4–2	Tottenham Hotspur	Upton Park, London
				Stadium: Boleyn Ground

5 January 1907 22	Tottenham Hotspur	4–0	Bristol Rovers	Tottenham, London
				Stadium: White Hart Lane

19 January 1907 23	Tottenham Hotspur	3–0	Swindon Town	Tottenham, London
				Stadium: White Hart Lane

26 January 1907 24	Norwich City	5–0	Tottenham Hotspur	Norwich, Norfolk
				Stadium: Newmarket Road

9 February 1907 25	Crystal Palace	0–1	Tottenham Hotspur	Crystal Palace, London
				Stadium: Crystal Palace Stadium

16 February 1907 26	Tottenham Hotspur	2–1	Brentford	Tottenham, London
				Stadium: White Hart Lane

2 March 1907 27	Tottenham Hotspur	0–0	Leyton	Tottenham, London
				Stadium: White Hart Lane

9 March 1907 28	Portsmouth	3–1	Tottenham Hotspur	Portsmouth, Hampshire
				Stadium: Fratton Park

16 March 1907 29	Tottenham Hotspur	2–0	New Brompton	Tottenham, London
				Stadium: White Hart Lane

23 March 1907 30	Plymouth Argyle	0–0	Tottenham Hotspur	Plymouth, Devon
				Stadium: Home Park

25 March 1907 31	Tottenham Hotspur	1–2	Luton Town	Tottenham, London
				Stadium: White Hart Lane

29 March 1907 32	Tottenham Hotspur	2–0	Southampton	Tottenham, London
				Stadium: White Hart Lane

30 March 1907 33	Tottenham Hotspur	3–0	Brighton & Hove Albion	Tottenham, London
				Stadium: White Hart Lane

1 April 1907 34	Millwall	2–0	Tottenham Hotspur	Isle of Dogs, London
				Stadium: North Greenwich

6 April 1907 35	Reading	2–0	Tottenham Hotspur	Reading, Berkshire
				Stadium: Elm Park

13 April 1907 36	Tottenham Hotspur	0–0	Watford	Tottenham, London
				Stadium: White Hart Lane

20 April 1907 37	Northampton Town	2–0	Tottenham Hotspur	Northampton, Northamptonshire
				Stadium: County Cricket Ground

27 April 1907 38	Tottenham Hotspur	2–0	Queens Park Rangers	Tottenham, London
				Stadium: White Hart Lane

=== Western League ===
==== Table ====
Pos	Team	Pld	W	D	L	GF	GA	GR	Pts
1	West Ham United	10	7	1	2	25	14	1.786	15
2	Plymouth Argyle	10	5	3	2	16	10	1.600	13
3	Portsmouth	10	4	2	4	16	19	0.842	10
4	Tottenham Hotspur	10	3	3	4	13	15	0.867	9
5	Southampton	10	4	0	6	14	16	0.875	8
6	Millwall	10	1	3	6	5	15	0.333	5

==== Results ====
3 September 1906 1	Tottenham Hotspur	0–0	Plymouth Argyle	Tottenham, London
				Stadium: White Hart Lane

10 September 1906 2	Tottenham Hotspur	2–3	Southampton	Tottenham, London
				Stadium: White Hart Lane

3 October 1906 3	Southampton	2–0	Tottenham Hotspur	Southampton, Hampshire
				Stadium: The Dell

8 October 1906 4	West Ham United	5–0	Tottenham Hotspur	Upton Park, London
				Stadium: Boleyn Ground

20 October 1906 5	Tottenham Hotspur	1–0	Millwall	Tottenham, London
				Stadium: White Hart Lane

7 November 1906 6	Portsmouth	1–0	Tottenham Hotspur	Portsmouth, Hampshire
				Stadium: Fratton Park

26 November 1906 7	Tottenham Hotspur	4–2	Portsmouth	Tottenham, London
				Stadium: White Hart Lane

12 December 1906 8	Plymouth Argyle	2–2	Tottenham Hotspur	Plymouth, Devon
				Stadium: Home Park

8 April 1907 9	Tottenham Hotspur	4–2	West Ham United	Tottenham, London
				Stadium: White Hart Lane

22 April 1907 10	Millwall	0–0	Tottenham Hotspur	Isle of Dogs, London
				Stadium: North Greenwich

=== FA Cup ===
==== Results ====
12 January 1907 First round	Tottenham Hotspur	0–0	Hull City	Tottenham, London
				Stadium: White Hart Lane; Attendance: 27,033

17 January 1907 First round reply	Hull City	0–0; Match was abandoned 10 minutes into extra time.	Tottenham Hotspur	Hull, Yorkshire
				Stadium: Anlaby Road; Attendance: 20,000

21 January 1907 First round second reply	Tottenham Hotspur	1–0	Hull City	Tottenham, London
	Chapman			Stadium: White Hart Lane; Attendance: 20,000

2 February 1907 Second round	Blackburn Rovers	1–1	Tottenham Hotspur	Blackburn, Lancashire
			Walton	Stadium: Ewood Park; Attendance: 24,963

7 February 1907 Second round replay	Tottenham Hotspur	1–1	Blackburn Rovers	Tottenham, London
	Reid			Stadium: White Hart Lane; Attendance: 29,900

11 February 1907 Second round second replay	Tottenham Hotspur	2–1	Blackburn Rovers	Aston, Birmingham
	Reid; Walton			Stadium: Villa Park; Attendance: 18,000

23 February 1907 Third round	Notts County	4–0	Tottenham Hotspur	Nottingham, Nottinghamshire
				Stadium: Villa Park; Attendance: 25,000

== Works cited ==
- Soar, Phil (1995). Tottenham Hotspur The Official Illustrated History 1882–1995. Hamlyn. ISBN 0-600-58706-1.
- Goodwin, Bob (1992). The Spurs Alphabet. ACL & Polar Publishing (UK) Ltd. ISBN 0-9514862-8-4.
