= Whitbourn =

Whitbourn is a surname. Notable people with the surname include:

- James Whitbourn (1963–2024), British composer and conductor
- John Whitbourn (born 1958), English author
- John Whitbourn (1885–1936), English footballer
