= Jim Chalmers (disambiguation) =

Jim Chalmers is a Queensland politician and member of the Australian House of Representatives since 2013.

Jim Chalmers may also refer to:

- Jim Chalmers (New South Wales politician) (1901–1986), member of the New South Wales Legislative Assembly from 1947 to 1956
- Jimmy Chalmers (1877–1915), Scottish footballer

== See also ==
- James Chalmers (disambiguation)
