= William McCurdy =

William McCurdy may refer to:

- William McCurdy II, American politician in Nevada
- William F. McCurdy, merchant and political figure in Nova Scotia, Canada
- William McCurdy (footballer), English association football player prior to the First World War
