= James Chalmers =

James Chalmers may refer to:

- James Chalmers (loyalist) (c. 1730–1806), Scottish-born Loyalist officer from Maryland in the American Revolutionary War
- James Chalmers (inventor) (1782–1853), Scottish inventor of the adhesive postage stamp
- James Ronald Chalmers (1831–1898), American politician
- James Chalmers (missionary) (1841–1901), Scottish-born missionary to New Guinea
- James Chalmers (actor) (born 1974), British actor
- James Chalmers (footballer) (1877–?)

== See also ==
- Jim Chalmers (disambiguation)
- James Chalmers McRuer (1890–1985), Canadian lawyer and author
