= Walter Eames =

Personal information
- Full name: Walter Eames
- Date of birth: January 1884
- Place of birth: Watford, Hertfordshire
- Date of death: 11 March 1941
- Place of death: Leavesden, Hertfordshire
- Position(s): Forward

Senior career*
Years	Team	Apps	(Gls)
1903–1906	Watford		
1906–1907	Tottenham Hotspur	7	(2)
1907–1908	Watford		
1908–1909	New Brompton	18	(5)
- *Club domestic league appearances and goals

Walter Eames (January 1884 – 11 March 1941) was an English professional footballer who played for Watford, Tottenham Hotspur and New Brompton.

== Career ==
Born in Watford Walter Eames signed to his local club with a professional contract in 1903. He stayed with the club until the beginning of the 1906–07 where in May 1906 he signed to Tottenham Hotspur. His debut was in the very first game of the season on 1 September 1906 in a Southern League game against West Ham United, which Tottenham lost at White Hart Lane 2–0. He stayed at the club for one season playing a total of 13 games and scoring 4 goals before moving to New Brompton. He made his debut for the club against Portsmouth on 12 December 1908 and scored both his team's goals in a 3–2 defeat. In total during the season he played 18 Southern League games and scored 5 goals. He did not remain with the club beyond the 1908–09 season.

He is recorded having died in Leavesden, Hertfordshire in March 1941.

== Career statistics ==
Club	Division	Season	Southern League		Western League		Other		Total	
Club	Division	Season	Apps	Goals	Apps	Goals	Apps	Goals	Apps	Goals
Tottenham Hotspur	Southern League	1906–07	7	2	4	0	2	2	13	4
New Brompton	Southern League	1908–09	18	5	—		0	0	18	5

== Works cited ==
- Brown, Tony (2003). The Definitive Gillingham F.C.: A Complete Record. Soccerdata. ISBN 978-1-8994-6820-1.
- Soar, Phil (1995). Tottenham Hotspur The Official Illustrated History 1882–1995. Hamlyn. ISBN 0-600-58706-1.
- Goodwin, Bob (1992). The Spurs Alphabet. ACL & Polar Publishing (UK) Ltd. ISBN 0-9514862-8-4.
