= Peter Kyle (footballer) =

Scottish footballer (1878–1957)

Personal information
- Date of birth: 21 December 1878
- Place of birth: Calder, Scotland
- Date of death: 19 January 1957 (aged 78)
- Place of death: Glasgow, Scotland
- Position: Centre forward

Youth career
- Glasgow and District Schools
- Glasgow Parkhead
- Partick Thistle

Senior career*
Years	Team	Apps	(Gls)
1898–1899	Clyde	9	(2)
1899–1900	Liverpool	4	(0)
1900–1901	Leicester City	30	(3)
1901–1902	West Ham United	1	(0)
1902–1905	Kettering Town	17	(6)
1905–1906	Tottenham Hotspur	25	(8)
1906–1908	Woolwich Arsenal	52	(21)
1908	Aston Villa	5	(0)
1908–1909	Sheffield United		
1909	Royal Albert		
1909–1910	Watford		
1910–1911	Royal Albert		
1911–?	Raith Rovers		
- * Club domestic league appearances and goals

Peter Kyle (21 December 1878 – 19 January 1957) was a Scottish footballer.

== Career ==
Born in Calder, Kyle played at centre-forward, first for Glasgow and District Schools, Glasgow Parkhead and Partick Thistle before joining Clyde. Reportedly rejected by Clyde due to his fierce temper, he moved south of the border to join Liverpool in 1899, and figured for Liverpool in their first four games of the 1899–1900 season, but lost his place to John Walker and only played one more match that season. Unhappy with reserve-team football, he left in summer 1900 and went on to play for a range of Southern League clubs, including Leicester City (1900–01), West Ham United (1901–02), Kettering Town (1902–05) and Tottenham Hotspur (1905–06). At Tottenham, he was reportedly involved in a fracas with teammate Christopher Carrick and suspended by the club.

In April 1906 he joined Woolwich Arsenal and made his debut on the first day of the 1906-07, in Arsenal's First Division win over Manchester City on 1 September 1906. That season, he was prolific in front of goal, scoring thirteen goals in 29 league appearances (although Charlie Satterthwaite was Arsenal's top scorer that season) as Arsenal finished seventh. The following season, Kyle was the Reds' top scorer with nine goals (eight in the league and one in the FA Cup), although Arsenal's form was much poorer and they only finished 14th.

With the club strapped for cash, Kyle was sold to keep the club's finances viable, to Aston Villa in March 1908. In all he scored 23 goals in 60 appearances for Woolwich Arsenal. Kyle was not as big a success at Villa as he had been with Arsenal, and after less than a year he had moved on to Sheffield United, (with Robert Evans for a combined fee of £1100). He finished his career back in the Southern League with Watford.
