= Willie Dryburgh =

Scottish footballer (1876–1951)

Personal information
- Full name: William Dryburgh
- Date of birth: 22 May 1876
- Place of birth: Cowdenbeath, Scotland
- Date of death: 5 April 1951 (aged 74)
- Place of death: Kelty, Scotland
- Position: Outside right

Senior career*
Years	Team	Apps	(Gls)
–1896	Dunfermline Juniors		
1896–1897	Cowdenbeath		
1897–1899	The Wednesday	35	(7)
1899–????	Millwall Athletic		
1901–1902	The Wednesday	11	(2)
1902–1904	Cowdenbeath		
1902–1903	→ Tottenham Hotspur (loan)	26	(2)
1904–1905	Lochgelly United		
- * Club domestic league appearances and goals

William Dryburgh (22 May 1876 – 5 April 1951) was a Scottish professional footballer who played as an outside right in the Scottish League for Cowdenbeath and in the Football League for The Wednesday.

== Career ==
Dryburgh was signed by Tottenham Hotspur in December 1902 and went on to make his debut in the Southern League on Christmas Day at home against Portsmouth. He scored one of the goals with the scoreline finishing in a 2–2 draw. In the FA Cup first round replay away against West Bromwich Albion he scored from the penalty spot to help Tottenham reach round two.

== Career statistics ==
Appearances and goals by club, season and competition
Club	Season	League			National Cup		Other		Total	
Club	Season	Division	Apps	Goals	Apps	Goals	Apps	Goals	Apps	Goals
The Wednesday	1897–98	First Division	15	3	2	0	—		17	3
The Wednesday	1898–99	First Division	20	4	0	0	—		20	4
The Wednesday	Total		35	7	2	0	—		37	7
The Wednesday	1901–02	First Division	11	2	1	0	—		12	2
The Wednesday	Total		46	9	3	0	—		49	3
Tottenham Hotspur (loan)	1902–03	Southern League First Division	16	2	4	1	10 (Note: 5 appearances in Western League, 5 appearances in London League)	0	30	3
Career total			62	11	7	1	10	0	79	12

== Honours ==
Cowdenbeath

- Central League: 1896–97

Tottenham Hotspur

- London League Premier Division: 1902–03

Individual

- Cowdenbeath Hall of Fame

== Bibliography ==
- Soar, Phil (1995). Tottenham Hotspur The Official Illustrated History 1882–1995. Hamlyn. ISBN 0-600-58706-1.
- Goodwin, Bob (1992). The Spurs Alphabet. ACL & Polar Publishing (UK) Ltd. ISBN 0-9514862-8-4.
