= History of Sheffield Wednesday F.C. =

History of an English football club

The history of Sheffield Wednesday F.C., an English football club from Sheffield, dates back to the club's establishment in 1867. The club would see early regional success followed by a rocky transition to professionalism. Although it has spent the majority of its Football League years in the top flight, its position within the league has varied from the very top to almost slipping to the fourth tier.

The club has won four English League titles, three FA Cups, one League Cup and one FA Community Shield.

Historical league positions in the Football League.

== The 19th century ==
=== The early years ===
The club was initially a cricket team named The Wednesday Cricket Club after the day of the week on which they played their matches. The footballing side of the club was established to keep the team together and fit during the winter months. SWFC was born on the evening of Wednesday 4 September 1867 at a meeting at the Adelphi Hotel in Sheffield. The formation was announced two days later with the following statement in the Sheffield Independent newspaper:

SHEFFIELD WEDNESDAY CRICKET CLUB AND FOOTBALL CLUB. – At a general meeting held on Wednesday last, at the Adelphi Hotel, it was decided to form a football club in connection with the above influential cricket club, with the object of keeping together during the winter season the members of this cricket club. From the great unanimity which prevailed as to the desirability of forming the club, there is every reason to expect that it will take first rank. The office bearers were elected as follows: – President, Mr. B. Chatterton; vice-president and treasurer, Mr. F. S. Chambers; hon. Secretary, Mr. Jno. Marsh; assistant, Mr. Castleton. Committee: Messrs Jno. Rodgers, Jno. White, C. Stokes, and H. Bocking. About sixty were enrolled without any canvas, some of them being the best players of the town.

Even at this first meeting it became apparent that football would soon come to eclipse the cricketing side of the club. The formation of the football club came within a decade of the first football club in the world, Sheffield F.C., being formed. Hallam F.C. was set up shortly afterwards and by 1867 Association football was becoming very popular. The Wednesday played their first football match in October 1867 against the Mechanics Club at Norfolk Park, a game which they won by three goals and four rouges to nil.

By 1 February 1868 Wednesday were playing their first competitive football match as they entered the Cromwell Cup, a four-team competition for newly formed clubs sponsored by Oliver Cromwell, the manager of the local Theatre Royal. They went on to win the cup, beating Cromwell's own team, The Garrick Club 1–0 after extra time in the final at Bramall Lane. The match has its own place in history with Wednesday being the scorers in the first recorded instance of a "golden goal" although the term was not used at the time.

Wednesday were joined by the Clegg brothers, Charles and William in 1870. Charles became the club's first international player when he played in the very first international on 30 November 1872. William represented the Wednesday in the next international on 8 March 1873. Both players would go on to be associated with the club for the rest of their lives. Although it would be Charles who became most heavily involved in football eventually rising to become president and chairman of the Football Association. Both the Cleggs received knighthoods in later life.

In 1876 Wednesday were joined by James Lang. The directors of the club had seen him playing for Glasgow against the Sheffield FA representative side. He was subsequently invited to come to Sheffield and play for the club and given a job, working in a silversmiths owned by one of the directors, which involved no formal duties. This is now acknowledged as the first case of professionalism in the game.

Sheffield's first annual tournament, the Sheffield FA Challenge Cup, was inaugurated in 1876 and won by Wednesday who beat Heeley, their chief rivals at the time, in the final 4–3 after extra time. They would go on to also win the first Wharncliffe Cup in 1879. By this time Wednesday had become the dominant force in local football.

=== Rocky road to professionalism ===
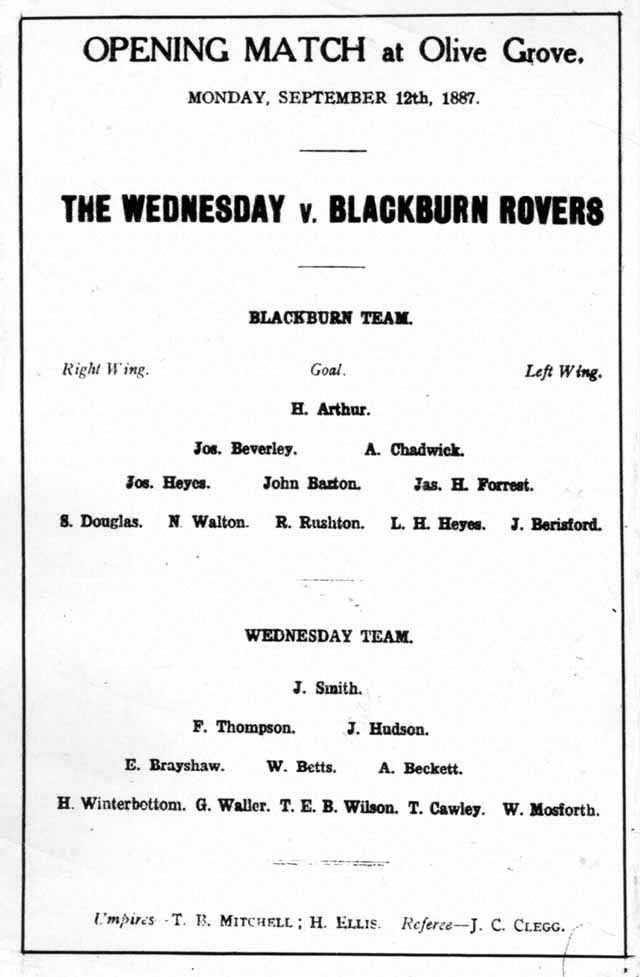
Leaflet advertising the opening match at Olive Grove between 'The Wednesday' and Blackburn Rovers, 12 September 1887.

In 1879 a number of Wednesday players were involved in a team referred to as The Zulus. The team was set up to raise funds for the families of victims of the Zulu War. They toured the north of England and Scotland but after allegations that the players were being paid, a practice that was illegal at the time, the team was forced to disband by the Sheffield FA in 1882.

In the summer of 1882, after a season in which The Wednesday reached the semifinals of the FA Cup, the cricket and football teams split permanently, and by the end of 1925 the cricket team had disbanded. In the 1880s Wednesday became a permanent fixture in the FA Cup as they attempted to move away from local competitions, however in the 1886–87 season Wednesday did not meet the deadline for entry and a revolt by several of their most skilful players followed.

Several players, all involved in the earlier Zulus controversy, temporarily left the club to play for a local works team which had managed to submit its entry on time. Later in the season the same players threatened to walk out permanently and set up a professional club called Sheffield Rovers. Wednesday's president at the time, John Holmes, was against the club turning professional, but under the immense pressure of the possibility of losing his star players he entered into talks with the rebels, eventually offering professional terms. At the meeting called to set up Sheffield Rovers, one of the rebel players, Tom Cawley, argued that Wednesday should be given one final chance and the football club duly turned professional on 22 April 1887. The initial wages were five shillings for home fixtures and seven shillings and sixpence for away games.

=== The Olive Grove years ===
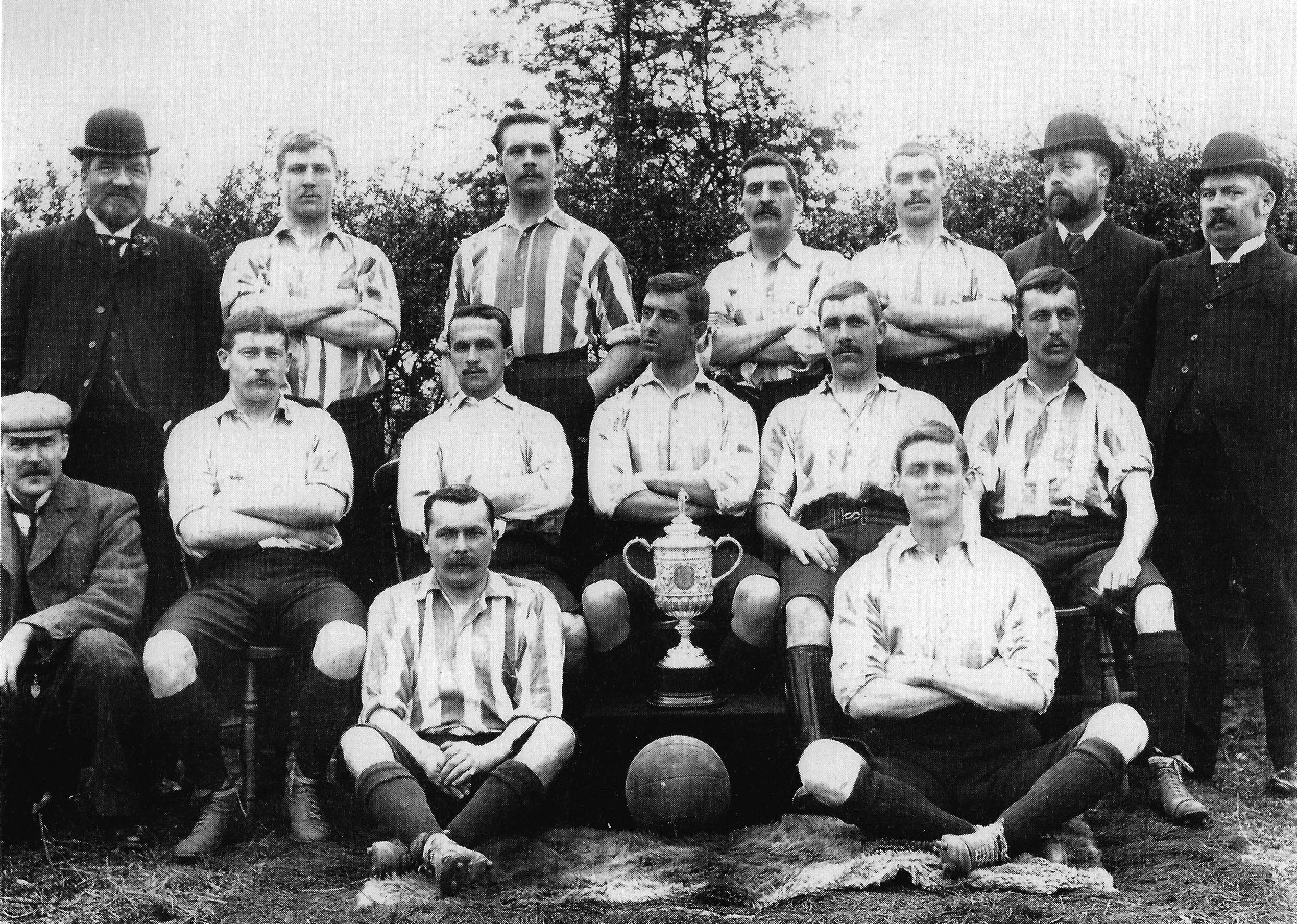
The Wednesday players posing with the FA Cup won in 1896

The move to professionalism led to the team building their own stadium rather than playing at venues such as Bramall Lane or Sheaf House whose owners took a share of the "gate". They leased some land by the railway tracks near Queen's Road from the Duke of Norfolk and in 1887 built the Olive Grove ground. They named it so because an olive farm was bulldozed in order to build it

In 1889, when their first application to join the Football League was rejected, the club became founder members of the Football Alliance of which they were the first champions in a season that they also reached the 1890 FA Cup Final, losing 6–1 to Blackburn Rovers at The Oval. They finished the following season bottom of the Alliance but recovered to finish in fourth place in the final Alliance season. The following season they were elected to Division 1 of the Football League when it was increased from 14 to 16 clubs, topping the poll with 10 votes. They won the FA Cup in 1896, beating Wolverhampton Wanderers by a 2–1 scoreline at Crystal Palace.

== The 20th century ==
=== Pre-war success ===
In a strong decade Wednesday won the league twice in the 1902–03 and 1903–04 seasons and the FA Cup again in 1907, beating Everton, again at Crystal Palace by two goals to one. After this a relatively fallow period was to be suffered for another two decades.

In 1929 the club officially changed its name from The Wednesday Football Club to Sheffield Wednesday Football Club under the stewardship of manager Robert Brown. However the name Sheffield Wednesday dates back as far as 1883: the former ground at Olive Grove had the name Sheffield Wednesday painted on the stand roof.

The team rose to the top of English football once again in the 1928–29 season. They had almost been relegated in the previous season but with 17 points in the last 10 matches the team pulled off the great escape, rising from bottom to 14th. Consecutive titles in the next two seasons started a run that would see the team finishing lower than third only once until 1935. The period was topped off with the team winning the FA cup for the third time in the club's history in 1935 under manager Billy Walker.

=== Post-war turmoil ===
The 50s saw Wednesday unable to consistently hold on to a position in the top flight. After being promoted back up in 1950, they were relegated a total of three times. Each time would see them bounce back up by winning the Second Division the following season. The decade ended on a high note with the team finally finishing in the top half of the First Division for the first time since World War 2. In 1958, they were the first team to play Manchester United after the Munich air disaster, an FA Cup tie, which they lost 3–0.

This led to a decade of successfully remaining in the First Division, which included a cup run to the FA cup final in 1966. Off the field the club was embroiled in the British betting scandal of 1964 where three of their players, Peter Swan, David Layne and Tony Kay, were accused of match fixing and betting against their own team. The three were subsequently convicted and, on release from prison, banned from football for life.

Wednesday were relegated at the end of the 1969–70 season, starting arguably the darkest period in the club's history. After going into freefall they spent 5 seasons in the Third Division and the club almost suffered relegation to the Fourth Division in 1976, but a revival over the next few seasons under first, Jack Charlton and then, Howard Wilkinson, saw them reach the First Division in 1984.

=== The 1980s: Resurgence ===
Under the management of Wilkinson, Sheffield Wednesday won promotion to the First Division at the end of the 1983–84 season and would remain at this level for all but one of the next sixteen seasons. They finished fifth in the league at the end of the 1985–86 season and only missed out on a UEFA Cup place because English teams were banned from European competitions due to the Heysel Stadium disaster at this time.

Wednesday's lack of ambition at that time resulted in Wilkinson leaving in September 1988 to take charge of Leeds United who were a Second Division club at the time. Within four seasons, he had taken them to the league title. No English manager has won the top English division since.

Meanwhile, Sheffield Wednesday replaced Wilkinson with his former assistant Peter Eustace in what proved to be a disastrous appointment. He was at the helm for just four months before being sacked to make way for former West Bromwich Albion manager Ron Atkinson, who had lifted two FA Cups with Manchester United.

Wednesday's on field woes paled into insignificance in April 1989 when 97 Liverpool supporters were unlawfully killed in a crush at the Leppings Lane end of the ground in an FA Cup semi-final hosted by the club. The Hillsborough disaster remains an indelible stain on the club's history and to this day is a source of deep shame for older supporters.

=== The 1990s: Life at the top ===
Under the stewardship of chairman Dave Richards, the 1990s became the most successful and exciting period in Wednesday's history since the 1930s. In Atkinson's first full season as manager, 1989–90, Sheffield Wednesday finished 18th in the First Division and were relegated on goal difference, despite the acquisition of the talented midfielder John Sheridan and the fact they had pulled towards mid-table at one stage of the season. They regained promotion at the first attempt but the real highlight of the season was a League Cup final victory over Atkinson's old club, Manchester United. Sheridan scored the only goal of the game, which delivered the club's first major trophy since their FA Cup success of 1935. Atkinson moved to Aston Villa shortly after promotion was achieved, and was replaced by the 37-year-old striker Trevor Francis. Wednesday finished third in the First Division in the 1991–92 season, their highest League finish since 1960–61, to book their place in the UEFA Cup and becoming a founder member of the new FA Premier League.

1992–93 was one of the most eventful seasons in the club's history. They finished seventh in the Premier League and reached the finals of both the FA Cup and the League Cup, but were on the losing side to Arsenal in both games, with the FA Cup final going to a replay that was only settled in the last minute of extra time. Chris Waddle was voted Football Writers' Association Footballer of the Year, and the strike partnership of David Hirst and Mark Bright was one of the most effective in the country. Francis was unable to achieve further success at the club, and two seasons later he was sacked, despite the club never having finished lower than 13th during his tenure. His successor was the former Luton Town, Leicester City and Tottenham Hotpsur manager David Pleat.

Pleat's first season as Sheffield Wednesday manager was frustrating, as they finished 15th in the Premiership despite having an expensive line-up which included Marc Degryse, Dejan Stefanović and Darko Kovačević, who all had only short spells at the club. An excellent start to the 1996–97 season saw the Owls top the Premiership after winning their first four games, and David Pleat was the Manager of the Month for August 1996, but the club failed to mount a serious title challenge and they faded to finish seventh. Pleat was sacked the following November with the club struggling in the Premiership, and Ron Atkinson briefly returned to steer the Owls clear of relegation.

At the end of the 1997–98 season, Atkinson's short-term contract was not renewed and Sheffield Wednesday turned to the Barnsley boss Danny Wilson as their new manager after being given the backword by both Gerard Houllier and Walter Smith who joined Liverpool and Everton respectively. Wilson's first season brought a slight improvement as they finished 12th in the Premiership. However, an expensive squad including Benito Carbone, Wim Jonk and the Italian firebrand Paolo Di Canio failed to live up to its wage bill and matters came to a head when Di Canio was sent off against Arsenal and pushed the referee to the ground on his way off, resulting in an eleven-match ban from which he never returned. Wilson was sacked in March 2000 with relegation looking certain, following a disastrous season in which Wednesday had been hammered 8–0 by Newcastle United the previous September. His assistant Peter Shreeves took temporary charge but was unable to escape relegation.

== The 21st century ==
=== Relegation to League One ===
Peter Shreeves remained at Sheffield Wednesday for the 2000–01 season as assistant to their new manager Paul Jewell. But Jewell was unable to mount a promotion challenge and he was sacked the following February with the Owls hovering just above the Division One relegation zone. Shreeves was given a permanent contract to take charge of the first team and he guided them to a 17th-place finish. After another bad start in 2001–02, he handed the reins over to assistant Terry Yorath. Wednesday finished just two places above the Division One relegation zone and the only bright spot of the season was a run to the semifinals of the League Cup.

Yorath resigned in October 2002 after Wednesday made a terrible start to the 2002–03 season, and in came Hartlepool manager Chris Turner – a former Owls goalkeeper – as his successor. Turner made a big effort to rejuvenate the side and there were some impressive results during the final weeks of the season, but a failure to beat Brighton in the penultimate game of the season condemned them to relegation.

Before the start of season 2003–04, local nightclub and casino owner, Dave Allen swapped his directorship role with Geoff Hulley to become chairman. Turner was optimistic of an immediate return to Division One, but this was not to be. Wednesday finished 2003–04 in 16th place in Division Two, with the lowest goals tally in the division (48). It was the lowest ebb of the club's history, rivalled only by the 1975–76 season, where Wednesday finished in 20th place in the same division with the same number of points as in the 2003–04 season. Turner was sacked after a poor start to the 2004–05 Coca-Cola League One campaign, and replaced by former Plymouth and Southampton manager Paul Sturrock.

=== Return to the Championship ===
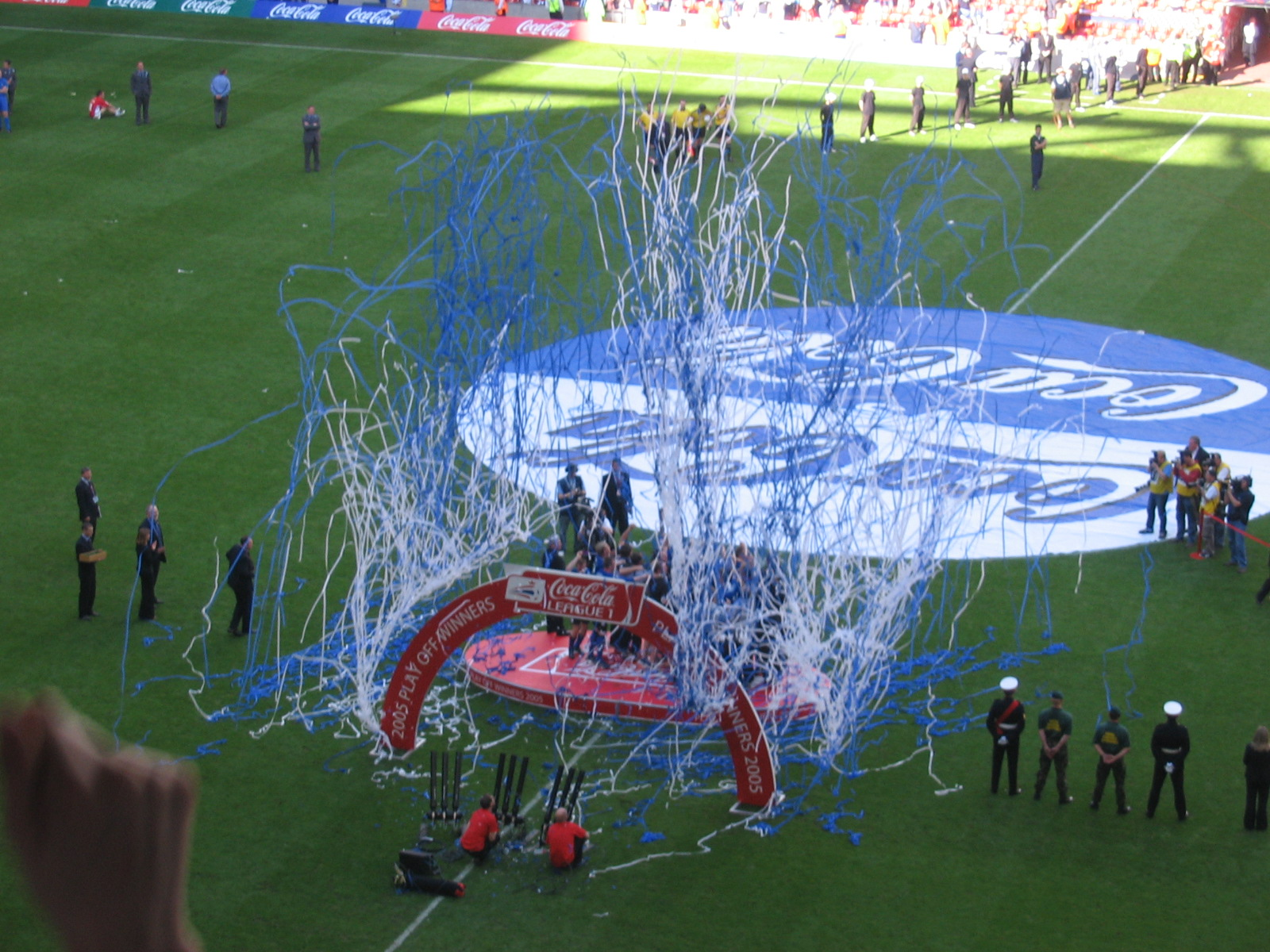
Wednesday Lift the 2005 League One Playoff Trophy

Sturrock revitalised Sheffield Wednesday's fortunes and they finished fifth in League One at the end of the 2004–05 season, qualifying for the promotion playoffs. They defeated Brentford 3–1 on aggregate in the semifinals, moving them into the playoff final on 29 May 2005 at the Millennium Stadium. 41,000 Wednesdayites descended on Cardiff for what was the biggest game in twelve years for the club. They weren't to be disappointed as the Owls took a 1–0 lead through Jon-Paul McGovern on the stroke of halftime. However, Hartlepool fought back and took a 2–1 lead with 20 minutes of the game remaining. Sturrock made a brave triple substitution bringing on 18-year-old striker Drew Talbot and the Owls' top scorer of the season, Steve MacLean (who had been out injured for the previous three months and had not kicked a ball). They combined with 10 minutes left as the Owls levelled the game 2–2. Talbot was adjudged to have been pushed down inside the box and Sheffield Wednesday were awarded a controversial penalty, which also resulted in the dismissal of Hartlepool player Westwood. MacLean duly slotted home the resultant penalty. They went on to win 4–2 after extra time, goals from Glenn Whelan and Drew Talbot, achieving promotion to the Championship.

On 17 April 2006, Sheffield Wednesday retained their place in the Championship with two matches remaining, with a 2–0 away win at Brighton, condemning Brighton, Millwall and Crewe to the drop in the process. Wednesday went on to finish the season in 19th place, 10 points clear of the relegation zone. They were statistically the best supported team in the Championship; their average home league attendance of 24,853 marginally beat newly relegated Norwich with 24,833.

=== Brian Laws and Alan Irvine ===
Despite having been awarded a new four-year contract just five weeks earlier, Sturrock was sacked after a slow start to the 2006–07 season. His replacement was the former Scunthorpe United boss Brian Laws. Wednesday finished the season ninth in the Football League Championship, just four points short of the playoffs.

On 25 June 2007, the River Don burst its bank during a period of severe weather in the area, and the whole ground was flooded with several feet of water. The changing rooms, restaurants and kitchens and boardroom were all flooded, as well as the shop; many local houses were also affected. The club and ground remained closed for the rest of June. On 6 July, the club issued a statement confirming that the pitch would be ready in time for a pre-season friendly match against Birmingham City on 4 August.

A disastrous start of six consecutive league defeats meant the club spent the 2007–08 season battling against relegation and went into the final match of the season against Norwich City knowing that defeat could send them down. After conceding first, a 4–1 victory in front of 36,208 spectators brought much needed relief. This was the Football League's highest attendance of the season and provided a fitting stage for Dion Dublin's final game. He received a standing ovation from all parts of the ground when substituted in the 66th minute.

Season 2008–09 saw Wednesday's first Sheffield derby win double in 95 years and a mid-table finish brought fresh hope for the coming season. But after a run of poor results, Laws left the club by mutual consent in December 2009. He was replaced in January by the former Preston North End boss Alan Irvine. Irvine won the January Championship Manager of the Month award, but the form was not sustained and the club was relegated after failing to beat Crystal Palace in front of 37,121 on the final day of the season.

=== Change of ownership structure ===
The relegation triggered the resignation of chairman Lee Strafford. Stepping into the breach was former Wednesday player and manager Howard Wilkinson, making it clear that this would be an interim measure. In July and September 2010 winding up petitions instigated by HMRC were successfully fought off but in November 2010 a third winding up order threatened the club's existence. The High Court's patience was clearly wearing thin but CEO Nick Parker succeeded in securing a stay of execution after Deputy Prime Minister and Sheffield Hallam MP, Nick Clegg, helped persuade the club's main creditor, the Co-operative Bank, to grant more time to find a buyer. Shortly afterwards, Leicester City chairman Milan Mandarić agreed to purchase the club. The purchase was completed the following month after an Extraordinary General Meeting of Wednesday's shareholders during which 99.7% of shareholders voted to sell the company to Mandarić's UK Football Investments for £1. Mandarić agreed to settle the club's outstanding debts as part of the deal and stepped down as chairman of Leicester City. For the first time in the club's history, the whole of the share base was now controlled by a single entity.

=== The Milan Mandarić Era ===
On the field, the club was failing to make its mark in League One and Irvine was replaced by Gary Megson, son of former Owls captain Don Megson, and twice previously a player for the club. Megson failed to salvage the season and the club ended in a disappointing 15th place, lower than when he had taken over.

Season 2011–12 marked the start of a change in the club's fortunes but, after a late dip in form, Megson was controversially replaced by former Cardiff City manager Dave Jones despite having just led Wednesday to what proved to be a season defining Sheffield derby win and with the club lying in third place. Jones carried on Megson's good work and completed the season unbeaten with ten wins and two draws, picking up two consecutive League One Manager of the Month awards. The final match of the season against Wycombe Wanderers attracted 38,082 spectators to Hillsborough to watch Wednesday achieve the victory needed to finish second in the division, clinching promotion at the expense of local rivals Sheffield United who subsequently lost an epic penalty shoot-out in the promotion playoff final to Huddersfield Town at Wembley.

With one of the lowest playing budgets in the Championship, the club finished 18th in the 2012–13 season. Using loan signings, Jones maintained the club's position in the division during a season where the fourth-bottom club, Barnsley, required 55 points to avoid relegation.

With no appreciable improvement in the budget, 2013–14 season was again proving to be a struggle and, with only one league win and the club second bottom, Jones was sacked at the start of December. Coach Stuart Gray was named caretaker manager and, after a good run of results, was finally given the job permanently. The length of contract remained confidential and, with a departure from club tradition, Gray was given the job title of head coach. For the third consecutive season Wednesday finished in a higher league position than the previous season.

Season 2014–15 was preceded by a story in the French newspaper, L'Equipe, of the imminent takeover of Wednesday by Hafiz Mammadov, an Azerbaijani industrialist and effective owner of RC Lens. With the Sheffield public hungry for news, Mandarić, perhaps unwisely, confirmed the takeover before its completion and announced a shirt sponsorship deal with the supposed new ownership. Mammadov subsequently failed to fulfil his legal obligations within the terms of the takeover agreement and Mandarić called time on the deal, instructing the club's lawyers accordingly. Embarrassingly, shirts had already been sold with the logo 'Azerbaijan Land of Fire' and the club decided to continue with the shirt sponsorship deal for the season, insisting that the deal was independent of the failed takeover.

=== Dejphon Chansiri ownership (2014–2025) ===
In 2014, the club was, once again, taken over by a new owner - Thai businessman Dejphon Chansiri, purchasing the club from Milan Mandarić for £37.5m. Chansiri stated his intention to win Premier League promotion for the 2017–18 season – the football club's 150th anniversary – and came close to achieving that goal a year ahead of schedule, with new coach Carlos Carvalhal leading the club into the end of season play-offs at the end of the 2015–16 season. Wednesday were beaten in the final by Hull City at Wembley. They made the play-offs again the following season, but lost on penalties to the eventually promoted Huddersfield Town in the semi-final.

The club were favourites to be promoted in the 2017–18 season, but injuries and poor results saw them drop to the lower half of the table. Carvalhal left by mutual consent in December 2017, and was replaced by Dutch manager Jos Luhukay a month later. The team finished in an uneventful 15th place at the end of the season. Luhukay was sacked in December 2018 after a run of only one win in 10, which left the team 18th in the table. He was replaced by former Aston Villa boss Steve Bruce who saw an upturn in form to finish 12th. However, Bruce controversially resigned in July 2019 to manage Newcastle United.

On 6 September 2019, the club appointed former Birmingham City manager Garry Monk as the new manager, who achieved a 16th-place finish in a season that was interrupted from March to June by the COVID-19 pandemic. On 31 July 2020, Sheffield Wednesday were found guilty of breaking EFL spending rules and began the 2020–21 season on -12 points, though the deficit was later reduced to -6 upon appeal. On 9 November 2020, Monk was sacked after a poor start to the season and was replaced by Tony Pulis. However, Pulis was also dismissed after only 45 days in charge on 28 December 2020. After a few months with Neil Thompson as caretaker manager, Darren Moore was appointed as the club's third permanent manager of the season in March 2021. Despite taking the fight to the final day, Moore could not prevent relegation to League One come the end of the season, bringing Wednesday's nine-year spell in the Championship to an end.

After failing to win promotion in their first season back in League One, Wednesday finished third in the 2022–23 season. In the play-off semi-finals, Wednesday lost 4–0 in the first leg against Peterborough United but won the second leg 5–1 before prevailing on penalties. Wednesday then won promotion back to the Championship by defeating Barnsley in the 2023 play-off final. Moore departed from the club on 19 June by mutual consent.

Moore was replaced by Xisco Muñoz, however, he was sacked after 12 games with the club winless during his tenure. Early in the season, following fan protests, owner Chansiri said he would put no more money into the club, unhappy with fans' treatment towards him and his family. On 31 October 2023, Chansiri, citing cashflow problems, asked Wednesday fans to raise £2m by 10 November 2023 to help the club pay an outstanding HMRC debt and cover wages. Danny Röhl was announced as Munoz's successor and oversaw a revival on form, eventually confirming safety from relegation on the final day of the season.

The club's midtable finish in the 2024–25 season was marred by further financial difficulties. The club were again placed under a registration embargo for failure to pay HMRC for the second year in a row. In March 2025, Chansiri issued a statement that the players hadn't been paid for the month of March due to cashflow problems. May, June and July 2025 payments to players were similarly delayed, and Wednesday were placed under an EFL registration embargo, and the club and Chansiri faced EFL charges relating to payment obligations. The club was also barred from carrying out any transfers or loans involving a fee in the summer 2025 window and the two 2026 transfer windows.

On 29 July 2025, ahead of the 2025–26 season, Röhl left the club (his assistant Henrik Pedersen succeeded him), and the North Stand at Hillsborough was temporarily closed by the city council due to "extensive corrosion" in the roof. On 1 August 2025, the EFL was reported to be increasingly concerned about the club's future and its ability to fulfil their Championship fixtures; defender Max Lowe decided to leave the club, while other senior players were said to be considering doing the same. A pre-season training game against Burnley on 2 August was cancelled, and players considered going on strike as the uncertainty continued. On 10 August 2025, the side's opening Championship fixture at Leicester City, which Wednesday lost 2–1, saw further protests against Chansiri's ownership of the club. Club debts had been settled on 8 August, using a solidarity payment from the Premier League, allowing Pedersen to start making additions to a squad with only 12 senior players ahead of the season's first league fixture at Hillsborough against Stoke City. On 4 October 2025, second-bottom Wednesday were humbled 5–0 at Hillsborough by Coventry City in a game interrupted by fans entering the pitch to protest against Chansiri's ownership after wages were not paid on time for the fifth time in seven months.

=== Administration and relegation (2025–present) ===
On 24 October 2025 the club went into administration ahead of a winding-up petition being filed against the club by HM Revenue and Customs. Administrators from financial advisory firm Begbies Traynor were appointed to run the club, ending Chansiri's involvement with Wednesday. The club was immediately docked 12 points by the Football League leaving the club bottom of the Championship on minus-six points. A further six points deduction for regulation breaches was announced on 1 December 2025, leaving the club on minus 10 points, 27 points from safety. On 24 December, the administrators confirmed that they intended to grant preferred bidder status to a consortium following the initial bidding process, which the BBC reported as a James Bord-led consortium. The preferred bidder funded the club's operating losses during the exclusivity period, helping ensure the club had sufficient money for the remainder of the season.

On 3 February 2026, Wednesday were 39 points from safety and on a club record run of 23 league matches without a win. Defeats at Blackburn Rovers (1–0) and Swansea City (4–0) set a record of nine straight league games without scoring. Wednesday ended their goal-less streak by scoring against Millwall on 14 February, but lost 2–1. Wednesday then lost the Steel City derby at Bramall Lane on 22 February; Sheffield United's 2–1 win condemned the Owls to the earliest relegation in EFL history.

Three days later, the Bord consortium pulled out of its takeover of Sheffield Wednesday, leaving the administrators seeking another buyer. Three bidders were reported to be vying to buy the club: Mike Ashley, Charlie Methven and David Storch, and Storch's Arise Capital Partners become the new preferred bidder. If a deal is agreed, Wednesday would start the 2026–27 season with a 15-point deduction as Arise's offer fails an EFL requirement to repay creditors 25p in the pound - a step criticised by the club's supporters' trust as "excessive and punitive" and potentially a deterrent to Arise's takeover.

Three further defeats extended the club's winless run to 30 games, and made it 13 successive league defeats (a Championship record). A 1–1 draw against Watford on 10 March 2026 ended the losing streak, but three more defeats and three draws then meant the Owls set a new EFL record of 37 consecutive league matches without a win. Defeats at Middlesbrough and Oxford United extended the run to 39 games.

On 2 May 2026, Arise Capital Partners LLC completed its acquisition of the club, ending the 175-day period of administration. The EFL also waived the 15-points deduction the Owls were due to receive for the 2026–27 season in light of the takeover and Chansiri's refusal to co-operate during the club's sale. Later the same day, Wednesday beat West Bromwich Albion 2–1, their first home win in over a year and their second win overall in the season, and ending their winless streak. Wednesday finished the season on zero points, avoiding becoming the first team in EFL history to finish on minus points.
