= Willie Murray (footballer, born 1881) =

Scottish footballer

Personal information
- Full name: William Brunton Murray
- Date of birth: 15 December 1881
- Place of birth: Forres, Scotland
- Date of death: 22 April 1929 (aged 47)
- Place of death: Kilmallie, Scotland
- Height: 5 ft 6 in (1.68 m)
- Position: Winger

Senior career*
Years	Team	Apps	(Gls)
1899–1900	Forres Mechanics		
1900–1901	Inverness Thistle		
1901–1903	Sunderland	8	(3)
1903–1904	Northampton Town		
1904–1906	Tottenham Hotspur	21	(0)
1906–1907	Leeds City	8	(0)
- * Club domestic league appearances and goals

William Brunton Murray (15 December 1881 – 22 April 1929) was a Scottish professional footballer who played as a winger for Sunderland.

== Career ==
Murray started his career in Scotland for local club Forres Mechanics and piqued the interest of Inverness Thistle who signed him to a contract. Murray moved to Sunderland in 1901 and played very few games. In 1903 he moved to Northampton Town where he had more regular football.

In May 1904 Tottenham signed Murray as cover for Jack Kirwan. His debut occurred on 29 October 1904 in a home game against Brentford which finished in a 1–1 draw. The following season Kirwan moved to Chelsea and Murray had more chances to play. However he lost his place to Chris Carrick and Alf Whyman and was released from the club in April 1906. While playing for Leeds City against Burnleyin October 1906, Murray's team-mate Soldier Wilson collapsed and died. Murray served as a pallbearer, carrying Wilson's coffin to Leeds Station.

== Bibliography ==
- Soar, Phil (1995). Tottenham Hotspur The Official Illustrated History 1882–1995. Hamlyn. ISBN 0-600-58706-1.
- Goodwin, Bob (1992). The Spurs Alphabet. ACL & Polar Publishing (UK) Ltd. ISBN 0-9514862-8-4.
