= Jack Jones (footballer, born 1874) =

English footballer (1874–1904)

Personal information
- Full name: John Thomas Jones
- Date of birth: 24 October 1874
- Place of birth: West Bromwich, England
- Date of death: 13 September 1904 (aged 29)
- Place of death: London, England
- Position: Inside forward

Senior career*
Years	Team	Apps	(Gls)
- Sandwell Albion
- Dudley
- Halesowen
1894–1897	Small Heath	35	(15)
1897–1902	Bristol Rovers	76	(36)
1902–1904	Tottenham Hotspur	52	(35)
- * Club domestic league appearances and goals

John Thomas Jones (24 October 1874 – 13 September 1904) was an English professional footballer who made 35 appearances in the Football League playing for Small Heath.

== Playing career ==
Jones was born in West Bromwich, Staffordshire. He played football for local clubs Sandwell Albion, Dudley and Halesowen before joining Small Heath, newly promoted to the First Division of the Football League, in late 1894. He made his debut on 23 February 1895 in a 2–1 home defeat to West Bromwich Albion, as a replacement for regular outside right Jack Hallam. In the 1895–96 season he played more frequently, in his preferred position of inside forward, and scored six league goals in 14 appearances. The club was relegated via the test match system, despite Jones's hat-trick in the last test match, an 8–0 defeat of Manchester City. The following season, he scored nine goals in 20 Second Division appearances. The strengths of his game were his ability to use both feet with equal skill and his good strike rate, which he was to maintain throughout his career.

Jones left Small Heath in 1897 to join Bristol Eastville Rovers, then playing in the Western League, where he stayed for five seasons. For the last three of these, until 1901–02, he was their top goalscorer in Southern League matches. He holds the club record for most goals scored in one match, with six in the 15–1 defeat of Weymouth in the qualifying rounds of the 1900–01 FA Cup; this remains Rovers' record margin of victory.

In the 1902 close season, Jones moved to fellow Southern League club Tottenham Hotspur, where he was known as "Bristol Jones" to distinguish him from the club captain, also a Jack Jones. He played regularly during the first half of the 1902–03 season and all through the following season, making 58 appearances in all competitions and scoring 35 goals. He was Tottenham's leading scorer in the 1903–04 Southern League season with 15 goals.

With the new season about to start, Jones contracted typhoid fever. He died in London on 13 September 1904, aged 29.
