= Andrew Swann (footballer) =

Scottish footballer

Personal information
- Date of birth: 1878
- Place of birth: Dalbeattie, Scotland
- Date of death: Not known
- Position: Centre forward

Youth career
- –: Dalbeattie

Senior career*
Years	Team	Apps	(Gls)
1898–1899	Lincoln City	13	(10)
1899–1900	New Brompton	27	(6)
1900–1901	Barnsley	29	(18)
1901	Woolwich Arsenal	7	(2)
1901	Gainsborough Trinity	?	(?)
1901–1902	Stockport County	14	(4)
1904	Mexborough	2	(0)
1904	Tottenham Hotspur	2	(0)
?–?	Partick Thistle	7	(?)
- * Club domestic league appearances and goals

Andrew Swann (also known as Harry Swan) (1878 – unknown) was a Scottish professional footballer who played in the Football League for Barnsley, Woolwich Arsenal and Stockport County as a centre forward. He was most notable for being the Football League Division Two top scorer for the 1900–01 season whilst playing for Barnsley. He was born in Dalbeattie in the historical county of Kirkcudbrightshire in Scotland.

== Career ==
After spells with Lincoln City and New Brompton, Swann rose to prominence playing for Barnsley in the Football League Division Two, and was the league's top scorer during the 1900–01 season, with 18 goals.

Following this season, he switched to division rivals Woolwich Arsenal, and made his debut in a 2–1 victory against his old club on 2 September 1901, scoring in the process. However, his time at the Manor Ground would yield just one more goal in six more appearances, with his last game and goal coming in a 1–0 victory over Doncaster Rovers on 30 November 1901. After a brief spell at Gainsborough Trinity, Swann switched to Stockport County the following month, going on to score four goals in 14 appearances for the side.

He returned to Scotland in 1902, before returning to England to play for Mexborough, followed by two Southern Football League games for Tottenham Hotspur during the 1904–05 season. He later played for Partick Thistle.

== Bibliography ==
- Goodwin, Bob (1992). The Spurs Alphabet. ACL & Polar Publishing (UK) Ltd. ISBN 0-9514862-8-4.
