= William Jones (English footballer, born 1876) =

English footballer

Personal information
- Full name: William John Jones
- Date of birth: 6 March 1876
- Place of birth: Brighton, England
- Date of death: 25 September 1959 (aged 83)
- Place of death: Bristol, England
- Position: Right half

Senior career*
| Years | Team | Apps | (Gls) |
- Long Eaton Rangers
- Wellington Athletic
| 189?–1897 | Loughborough | 35 | (18) |
| 1897–1906 | Bristol City | 238 | (27) |
| 1906–1907 | Tottenham Hotspur | 8 | (0) |
| 1907–19?? | Swindon Town | 8 | (0) |
| Total | | 289+ | (45+) |

International career
| 1901 | England | 1 | (0) |
- * Club domestic league appearances and goals

William John Jones (6 March 1876 – 25 September 1959) was an England international footballer who played as a right half. Jones made over 180 Football League appearances prior to the First World War.

== Career ==
Jones was born in Brighton and earned one cap for England in a 3–0 win v Ireland at the Dell on 9 March 1901 while playing professionally for Bristol City.

Jones began his football career with Long Eaton Rangers before joining Wellington Athletic. He moved into the Second Division of the Football League when he joined Loughborough and was top scorer in 1896–97. Jones was the first player signed for Bristol City by new manager Sam Hollis in 1897. Jones made 8 appearances scoring 2 goals in 1897–98 when Bristol City finished runners up in the Southern Football League, he also made 9 appearances and scored 6 goals in the Western League championship winning side. Jones scored 4 goals in the 14–1 win v Eastleigh on 26 January 1898. Jones was the regular right half in 1898–99 making 23 appearances when City again finished as runners up in the Southern League. Jones missed only one match in 1899–1900, he began as right half but moved to centre forward when Alex Caie was transferred to Millwall. Jones made 31 appearances and scored 15 goals including 4 goals in the 5–1 win v Sheppey United on 3 March 1900. The following season Bristol City were runners up again in the Southern League with Jones making 28 appearances and scoring 1 goal. When Bristol City made their Football League debut in the Second Division on 7 September 1901 Jones played right half. Jones was ever present with 35 appearances in 1901–02. Jones made 32 appearances scoring 2 goals missing only 2 matches as "the Babes" rose to 4th place in 1902–03. City repeated the 4th-place finish in the following season when Jones made 32 appearances scoring 4 goals from the right half position. Jones made 32 appearances scoring 3 goals as City completed a trio of 4th-place finishes in 1904–05. When Bristol City won the Second Division championship in 1905–06 the injury prone Jones made 18 appearances playing in all of the record sequence of 14 successive wins early in the season. Jones moved to Tottenham Hotspur in the summer of 1906. Jones moved to Swindon Town in the summer of 1907.

After retiring from football Jones was landlord of the "Barley Mow" in Bedminster and died in 1959 at Snowdon Road Hospital, Bristol.
