= 1902–03 in English football =

Football in England
- Season: 1902–03

Men's football
- First Division: The Wednesday
- Second Division: Manchester City
- Southern League: Southampton
- Northern League: Newcastle United A
- The Combination: Wrexham
- Western League: Portsmouth
- FA Cup: Bury
- Sheriff of London Charity Shield: Tottenham Hotspur

The 1902–03 season was the 32nd season of competitive football in England.

== Events ==
Aston Villa win 12 of their last 15 games to finish one point behind champions The Wednesday.

== Honours ==
Competition	Winner
First Division	The Wednesday (1)
Second Division	Manchester City
FA Cup	Bury (2)
Home Championship	England, Scotland & Ireland

Notes = Number in parentheses is the times that club has won that honour. * indicates new record for competition

== League tables ==
=== First Division ===
Pos	Team	Pld	W	D	L	GF	GA	GAv	Pts	Relegation
1	The Wednesday (C)	34	19	4	11	54	36	1.500	42	
2	Aston Villa	34	19	3	12	61	40	1.525	41	
3	Sunderland	34	16	9	9	51	36	1.417	41	
4	Sheffield United	34	17	5	12	58	44	1.318	39	
5	Liverpool	34	17	4	13	68	49	1.388	38	
6	Stoke	34	15	7	12	46	38	1.211	37	
7	West Bromwich Albion	34	16	4	14	54	53	1.019	36	
8	Bury	34	16	3	15	54	43	1.256	35	
9	Derby County	34	16	3	15	50	47	1.064	35	
10	Nottingham Forest	34	14	7	13	49	47	1.043	35	
11	Wolverhampton Wanderers	34	14	5	15	48	57	0.842	33	
12	Everton	34	13	6	15	45	47	0.957	32	
13	Middlesbrough	34	14	4	16	41	50	0.820	32	
14	Newcastle United	34	14	4	16	41	51	0.804	32	
15	Notts County	34	12	7	15	41	49	0.837	31	
16	Blackburn Rovers	34	12	5	17	44	63	0.698	29	
17	Grimsby Town (R)	34	8	9	17	43	62	0.694	25	Relegation to the Second Division
18	Bolton Wanderers (R)	34	8	3	23	37	73	0.507	19	Relegation to the Second Division

Source: World Football
Rules for classification: 1) Points; 2) Goal average; 3) Goals scored
(C) Champions; (R) Relegated

=== Second Division ===
Pos	Team	Pld	W	D	L	GF	GA	GAv	Pts	Promotion or relegation
1	Manchester City (C, P)	34	25	4	5	95	29	3.276	54	Promotion to the First Division
2	Small Heath (P)	34	24	3	7	74	36	2.056	51	Promotion to the First Division
3	Woolwich Arsenal	34	20	8	6	66	30	2.200	48	
4	Bristol City	34	17	8	9	59	38	1.553	42	
5	Manchester United	34	15	8	11	53	38	1.395	38	
6	Chesterfield Town	34	14	9	11	67	40	1.675	37	
7	Preston North End	34	13	10	11	56	40	1.400	36	
8	Barnsley	34	13	8	13	55	51	1.078	34	
9	Burslem Port Vale	34	13	8	13	57	62	0.919	34	
10	Lincoln City	34	12	6	16	46	53	0.868	30	
11	Glossop	34	11	7	16	43	57	0.754	29	
12	Gainsborough Trinity	34	11	7	16	41	59	0.695	29	
13	Burton United	34	11	7	16	39	59	0.661	29	
14	Blackpool	34	9	10	15	44	59	0.746	28	
15	Leicester Fosse	34	10	8	16	41	65	0.631	28	
16	Doncaster Rovers (R)	34	9	7	18	35	72	0.486	25	Failed re-election and demoted
17	Stockport County	34	7	6	21	38	74	0.514	20	Re-elected
18	Burnley	34	6	8	20	30	77	0.390	20	Re-elected

(C) Champions; (P) Promoted; (R) Relegated
