= William McCurdy (footballer) =

Personal information
- Date of birth: 4 September 1876
- Place of birth: Bridgeton, Glasgow, Scotland
- Position(s): Full-back

Senior career*
Years	Team	Apps	(Gls)
	Vale of Clyde	0	(0)
1900–1901	Luton Town	0	(0)
1901–1902	Nottingham Forest	0	(0)
1902–1904	New Brompton	52	(0)
1904–1905	Tottenham Hotspur	12	(0)
1905–1906	New Brompton	0	(0)
1906–1910	Luton Town		
- *Club domestic league appearances and goals

William McCurdy (born 4 September 1876) was a Scottish professional footballer who played for Luton Town, New Brompton, Nottingham Forest and Tottenham Hotspur.

== Career ==
Born in Bridgeton, Glasgow, McCurdy first played for local team Vale of Clyde in Scotland before moving to England. He first had a spell with Luton Town at the turn of the century and then moved to Nottingham Forest before the season ended. After one full season in Nottingham McCurdy next joined New Brompton. He spent two seasons with the Kent-based club and was a regular in the team, playing 30 times in all competitions in his first season and 28 times in his second.

In May 1904 McCurdy moved to London to join Tottenham Hotspur and stayed there for one season. His debut game occurred on 19 September 1904 in the Western League where Tottenham played Queens Park Rangers in a 4–1 spectacle. In all McCurdy made 12 Southern League appearances, 10 in the Western League and another seven recording a total of 29 appearances for the club.

After being released by Tottenham at the end of the season McCurdy returned to New Brompton for one season and then back to Luton where he stayed for four seasons before retiring from the sport.

== Bibliography ==
- Brown, Tony (2003). The Definitive Gillingham F.C.: A Complete Record. Soccerdata. ISBN 978-1-8994-6820-1.
- Soar, Phil (1995). Tottenham Hotspur The Official Illustrated History 1882–1995. Hamlyn. ISBN 0-600-58706-1.
- Goodwin, Bob (1992). The Spurs Alphabet. ACL & Polar Publishing (UK) Ltd. ISBN 0-9514862-8-4.
