= Jabez Darnell =

English footballer (1884–1950)

Personal information
- Date of birth: 28 March 1884
- Place of birth: Potton, England
- Date of death: 1950 (aged 65–66)
- Place of death: Edmonton, England
- Position(s): Left half

Senior career*
Years	Team	Apps	(Gls)
- Northampton Town
1905–1915	Tottenham Hotspur	184	(1)
- *Club domestic league appearances and goals

Jabez Darnell (28 March 1884 – December 1950) was a professional footballer who played for Northampton Town and Tottenham Hotspur.

The left half transferred to the club from Biggleswade Town. Between 1905 and 1915, Darnell took part in a total of 327 matches and scoring on ten occasions in all competitions.
