= Charles Brown (footballer) =

Personal information
- Full name: Charles Brown
- Place of birth: Greenock, Scotland
- Height: 5 ft 8 in (1.73 m)

Senior career*
Years	Team	Apps	(Gls)
- New Brighton Tower
1899–1901	Stalybridge Rovers		
1901–1902	Everton		
1902–1904	Tottenham Hotspur	16	(0)
1904	Hull City (trial)		
1904	Reading		
1905	Luton Town		
- * Club domestic league appearances and goals

Charles Brown was a footballer who played at the turn of the twentieth century for a number of clubs including Everton and Tottenham Hotspur.

== Career ==
Brown started off his career with New Brighton Tower before moving to Manchester club Stalybridge Rovers where he went on to win the Lancashire League trophy with them. In 1901–02 he moved to Everton and was playing reverse football for them. Although the club wanted to keep him he decided to join the London club Tottenham Hotspur. His debut for Tottenham occurred on 6 October 1902 in an away London League match against Brentford which Spurs won 5–1. He went on to play all but one game in the London League with Spurs helping to club to win the title. Brown was released by Spurs in 1904 and he went on to play a total of 44 games and scored one goal for the club. He then had a trial with Hull City, but instead chose to play a season for Reading and the following season went to Luton Town.

== Honours ==
Stalybridge Rovers

- Lancashire League

Tottenham Hotspur

- London League 1902–03

== Bibliography ==
- Soar, Phil (1995). Tottenham Hotspur The Official Illustrated History 1882–1995. Hamlyn. ISBN 0-600-58706-1.
- Goodwin, Bob (1992). The Spurs Alphabet. ACL & Polar Publishing (UK) Ltd. ISBN 0-9514862-8-4.
