= Alfred Whyman =

English footballer

Personal information
- Date of birth: 31 October 1884
- Place of birth: Edmonton, London, England
- Position: Outside left

Senior career*
Years	Team	Apps	(Gls)
1905–1908	Tottenham Hotspur	29	(6)
1908–1909	New Brompton	40	(8)
1909–1920	Queens Park Rangers	206	(25)
- * Club domestic league appearances and goals

Alfred Whyman (born 1884) was an English footballer who played with Tottenham Hotspur, New Brompton and Queens Park Rangers.
