= Patrick Gilhooley =

Scottish footballer

Personal information
- Full name: Patrick Gilhooley
- Date of birth: 6 July 1876
- Place of birth: Draffan, Scotland
- Date of death: 20 February 1907 (aged 30)
- Place of death: Cleland, Scotland
- Position: Inside forward

Senior career*
Years	Team	Apps	(Gls)
1893–1894	Vale of Avon Juveniles		
1894–1895	Larkhall Thistle		
1895–1896	Cambuslang Hibernian		
1896–1900	Celtic	46	(17)
1900–1901	Sheffield United	15	(3)
1901–1904	Tottenham Hotspur	47	(7)
1904	Brighton & Hove Albion		
Total		105	(27)

International career
1898	Scottish League XI	1	(0)
- * Club domestic league appearances and goals

Patrick Gilhooley (6 July 1876 – 20 February 1907) was a Scottish footballer who played as an inside forward in the Football League for Sheffield United, and in the Southern League for Tottenham Hotspur. He had earlier played for Celtic, winning the Scottish Football League championship in 1897–98, in an unbeaten season.

In the spring of 1898, Gilhooley played in a SFL representative team match and in a Home Scots v Anglo-Scots international trial, but he never received a full cap for Scotland.

== Career ==
Gilhooley joined Tottenham in September 1901 and went on to make his debut for the club in the Western League against Reading. The game occurred on 9 September 1901 where Tottenham won 4–0. Gilhooley went on to recorded 18 appearances and two goals in the Southern League and a total of 61 apps and 8 goals for the club.

== Bibliography ==
- Soar, Phil (1995). Tottenham Hotspur The Official Illustrated History 1882–1995. Hamlyn. ISBN 0-600-58706-1.
- Goodwin, Bob (1992). The Spurs Alphabet. ACL & Polar Publishing (UK) Ltd. ISBN 0-9514862-8-4.
