= John Whitbourne =

English footballer (1885–1936)

Personal information
- Full name: John Giles Whitbourne
- Date of birth: 1885
- Place of birth: Middlesbrough, England
- Date of death: 1936 (aged 50–51)
- Position: Goalkeeper

Senior career*
| Years | Team | Apps | (Gls) |
| 1903–1904 | South Bank | | |
| 1904–1905 | Sunderland | 3 | (0) |
| 1905–1908 | Tottenham Hotspur | 19 | (0) |
| 1908–19?? | Leyton | | |
- * Club domestic league appearances and goals

John Giles Whitbourne (1885 – 1936) was an English professional footballer who played as a goalkeeper for Sunderland, Tottenham Hotspur and Leyton.

== Career ==
Born 1885, in Middlesbrough, Whitbourne first represented local club South Bank before moving to Sunderland where he spent the one season for the 1904–1905 campaign. He was mainly in the reserves at Sunderland and was recorded as only player three first team competitive games. Then in May 1905 Whitbourne move to London to play for Tottenham. His first year he played in the reserves as John Eggett was Tottenham's first choice keeper. His debut was in the Western League on 13 November 1905 in a home match against Brentford that Spurs lost 3–2. It wasn't until Eggett got injured in September 1906 that Whitbourne had a chance to play. In 1907 Tottenham signed Gordon Manning and Whitbourne went back to playing in the reserves until he was released in 1908. He died in 1936, aged 50 or 51.

== Works cited ==
- Soar, Phil (1995). Tottenham Hotspur The Official Illustrated History 1882–1995. Hamlyn. ISBN 0-600-58706-1.
- Goodwin, Bob (1992). The Spurs Alphabet. ACL & Polar Publishing (UK) Ltd. ISBN 0-9514862-8-4.
- Dykes, Garth; Lamming, Doug (2000). All the Lads: A Complete Who's Who of Sunderland AFC. Great Britain. ISBN 9781899538157.
