= John Burton (footballer, born 1875) =

English football player

Jack Burton
Personal information
- Full name: John Henry Burton
- Date of birth: 13 August 1875
- Place of birth: Derby, Derbyshire
- Date of death: 13 May 1949 (aged 73)
- Place of death: Derby, Derbyshire
- Height: 5 ft 7 in (1.70 m)
- Position: Defender

Senior career*
Years	Team	Apps	(Gls)
- Derby St. Andrews
1896	Derby County		
1899	Chatham Town		
1900–1905	Tottenham Hotspur	30	(2)
1906	Preston North End		
1908	West Ham United		
- * Club domestic league appearances and goals

John Henry Burton (13 August 1875 – 13 May 1949) was an English footballer who played for Derby County, Tottenham Hotspur, Preston North End and West Ham United.

== Career ==
Born in Derby, Burton started his career with the local clubs before moving to Chatham Town. When Chatham where removed from the Southern League he quit the club and joined Tottenham Hotspur during the 1900–01 season. Burton made his debut in the second half of the season in the Southern League away game against Gravesend United which Tottenham lost 2–1. After five season with Tottenham he left the club for Preston North End and finished his career at West Ham United.

His brother Oliver Burton also played for Tottenham.
