= Alf Warner =

English footballer

Personal information
- Full name: Alfred Cragg Warner
- Date of birth: April 1879
- Place of birth: Hyson Green, Nottingham, England
- Position: Inside forward

Senior career*
Years	Team	Apps	(Gls)
1896–1897	Notts Rangers		
1897–1898	Notts Olympic		
1898–1899	Weal		
1899–1902	Notts County	49	(14)
1902–1905	Tottenham Hotspur	47	(13)
1905–1907	Luton Town		
1907–1908	Notts County	7	(1)
Total		103	(28)
- * Club domestic league appearances and goals

Alfred Cragg Warner (born April 1879) was an English footballer who played in the Football League for Notts County.

== Career ==
Warner signed to Tottenham Hotspur in May 1902 after serving three years at Notts County. He made his debut for Tottenham on 6 September 1902 in the Southern League at home against Queens Park Rangers. The game finished in a 0–0 draw. He played in all the London League games that season helping Tottenham to win the trophy. Tottenham released Warner from his contract in 1905 and he then signed for Luton Town. He played for the club for two years and then retired. He was however persuaded to return to Notts County, but only played a few games before permanently retiring.

== Honours ==
Tottenham Hotspur

- London League: 1902–03

== Bibliography ==
- Soar, Phil (1995). Tottenham Hotspur The Official Illustrated History 1882–1995. Hamlyn. ISBN 0-600-58706-1.
- Goodwin, Bob (1992). The Spurs Alphabet. ACL & Polar Publishing (UK) Ltd. ISBN 0-9514862-8-4.
