= Jimmy Chalmers =

Scottish footballer

Personal information
- Full name: James Chalmers
- Date of birth: 3 December 1877
- Place of birth: Old Luce, Scotland
- Date of death: 12 July 1915 (aged 37)
- Place of death: Gallipoli, Ottoman Turkey
- Positions: Outside left; inside left

Senior career*
Years	Team	Apps	(Gls)
–1896	Beith		
1896–1897	Morton	18	(8)
1897–1898	Sunderland	26	(6)
1898–1899	Preston North End	10	(2)
1899–1900	Notts County	25	(2)
1900	Beith		
1900–1901	Partick Thistle	6	(0)
1901–1902	Watford	30	(5)
1902–1904	Tottenham Hotspur	10	(1)
1904–1906	Swindon Town	62	(13)
1906–1908	Norwich City	14	(2)
- Clyde
- Beith
- * Club domestic league appearances and goals

James Chalmers (3 December 1877 – 12 July 1915) was a Scottish professional footballer who played in the Football League for Sunderland, Notts County and Preston North End as a forward. He also played in the Southern League for Swindon Town, Watford, Tottenham Hotspur and Norwich City. He died during the Gallipoli campaign.

== Career ==
Chalmers began his career in Scotland with Greenock Morton before moving to England to play for Sunderland. After one season he moved to Preston North End and continued this with Notts County and Watford. In May 1902 Tottenham Hotspur signed Chalmers to be understudy to Jack Kirwan. Chalmers first game for Tottenham was in a friendly against Cambridge University. He played in the Western League first and his Southern League league debut for Spurs occurred later in the season on 17 January 1903 which was an away game against Northampton Town where Tottenham lost 3–1. He was a member of the squad that went on the win the London League title in the 1902–03 season. Chalmers was released from the club in 1904 and then moved to Swindon Town. He then had spells with Norwich City and Bristol Rovers before retiring.

== Personal life ==
Chalmers served as a private in the Royal Scots Fusiliers during the First World War and died of wounds suffered at Achi Baba Nullah, Gallipoli on 12 July 1915. He is commemorated on the Helles Memorial.

== Career statistics ==
Appearances and goals by club, season and competition
Club	Season	League			National Cup		Total	
Club	Season	Division	Apps	Goals	Apps	Goals	Apps	Goals
Morton	1896–97	Scottish League Second Division	18	8	5	1	23	9
Sunderland	1897–98	First Division	23	4	1	0	24	4
Sunderland	1898–99	First Division	3	1	0	0	3	1
Sunderland	Total		26	5	1	0	27	5
Partick Thistle	1900–01	Scottish League First Division	6	0	0	0	6	0
Watford	1901–02	Southern League First Division	30	5	2	1	32	6
Tottenham Hotspur	1902–03	Southern League First Division	4	0	0	0	4	0
Tottenham Hotspur	1903–04	Southern League First Division	6	1	0	0	6	1
Tottenham Hotspur	Total		10	1	0	0	10	1
Swindon Town	1904–05	Southern League First Division	31	11	2	0	33	11
Swindon Town	1905–06	Southern League First Division	31	2	2	0	33	2
Swindon Town	Total		62	13	4	0	66	13
Career total			134	24	7	1	141	25
