= Harold Stansfield =

English footballer

Personal information
- Full name: Harold Stansfield
- Date of birth: 21 July 1878
- Place of birth: Ardwick, Manchester
- Date of death: 1963
- Height: 1.71 m (5 ft 7 in)
- Position: Forward

Senior career*
| Years | Team | Apps | (Gls) |
| 1897-1898 | Fallowfield | 0 | (0) |
| 1898-1899 | Berry's Association (Harpurhey) | 0 | (37) |
| 1899-1900 | Preston North End | 4 | (1) |
| 1900-1901 | Stockport County | 30 | (3) |
| 1901-1902 | Wigan United | 35 | (28) |
| 1902–1904 | Stockport County | 0 | (0) |
| 1904-1908 | Tottenham Hotspur | 48 | (9) |
| 1908-1913 | Luton Town | 135 | (25) |
| 1913–when? | Bristol Rovers | 0 | (0) |
- * Club domestic league appearances and goals

Harold Stansfield (Born: 21 July 1878 – 1963) was a professional footballer who played for Preston North End, Stockport County, Tottenham Hotspur, Luton Town and Bristol Rovers.

== Career ==
Born in Ardwick, Manchester, Harold Stansfield first played for amateur side Fallowfield FC (Manchester). He next played for the short lived Berry's Association football club in Lancashire. Following this he joined Preston North End for a season before the first of two stints at Stockport County. He joined Lancashire League side Wigan United for one season (1901/02) leaving as the top scorer. In the summer of 1902 it was recorded that he joined Stockport County. for the second time.

After Stockport County failed to secure re-election to the Football League Stansfield chose instead to sign for Tottenham Hotspur in 1904. Stansfield debut for Tottenham was also the first game of the 1904–05 season, where Spurs played at home to Fulham and lost 1–0. Stansfield played regularly in the that season, but the following season he played more of a reserve. In all competitions and friendlies Stansfield played a total of 98 games, scoring 16 times.

Luton Town signed Stansfield in 1908 where he played far more games recording a total of 154 appearances and scoring 28 times for the club. He stayed at the club till he moved to Bristol Rovers in 1913, after some struggles he retired from the game.

Stansfield died in 1963.

== Bibliography ==
- Soar, Phil (1995). Tottenham Hotspur The Official Illustrated History 1882–1995. Hamlyn. ISBN 0-600-58706-1.
- Goodwin, Bob (1992). The Spurs Alphabet. ACL & Polar Publishing (UK) Ltd. ISBN 0-9514862-8-4.
