= Christopher Carrick =

English footballer

Personal information
- Date of birth: 8 October 1882
- Place of birth: Stockton-on-Tees, England
- Date of death: June 1927 (aged 44)
- Place of death: Middlesbrough, England
- Position: Outside left

Senior career*
| Years | Team | Apps | (Gls) |
| 1900–1904 | Middlesbrough | 26 | (6) |
| 1904–1905 | West Ham United | 18 | (6) |
| 1905–1906 | Tottenham Hotspur | 15 | (4) |
| 1906–1907 | Reading | | |
| 1907–1908 | Bradford Park Avenue | | |
| 1908 | Glentoran | | |
- * Club domestic league appearances and goals

Christopher Carrick (8 October 1882 – June 1927) was an English footballer who played for Middlesbrough, West Ham United, Tottenham Hotspur, Reading, Bradford Park Avenue and Glentoran as an outside-left. He was described as "a sturdy little winger, quick off the mark with the rare gift of taking chances".

== Career ==
Born in Stockton, Carrick played for Middlesbrough, scoring six goals in 26 Football League matches over three seasons. He was signed by West Ham United manager Syd King for the 1904–05 season, part of an influx of new players that also included Boro teammate Frank Piercy. He made his debut on 8 October 1904 in a 2–0 home win against Swindon Town. On 28 January 1905 he scored his first goals for West Ham with a hat-trick in a 6–2 home win against Luton Town. He played only 18 games, scoring six goals, before he came to the attention of Tottenham Hotspur, moving to them in the summer of 1905. Signed to replace John Kirwan who had moved to Chelsea, Carrick did not play regularly for Tottenham until the middle of the 1905–06 season. In March 1906 Tottenham travelled to play away games at Bristol Rovers and at Plymouth Argyle. On returning to London Carrick and a teammate were suspended by Tottenham for "ignoring training rules". He did not play for them again and was transferred to Reading before moving to Bradford Park Avenue for the 1907–08 season. In 1908 he moved to Ireland to play for Glentoran. He died in Middlesbrough in June 1927, aged 44, following a long illness.

== Bibliography ==
- Goodwin, Bob (1992). The Spurs Alphabet. ACL & Polar Publishing (UK) Ltd. ISBN 0-9514862-8-4.
