= Joe Walton (footballer, born 1881) =

English footballer (1881–1962)

Personal information
- Full name: Joseph Walton
- Date of birth: 8 January 1881
- Place of birth: Morecambe, England
- Date of death: 1962 (aged 80–81)
- Position: Outside right

Senior career*
Years	Team	Apps	(Gls)
1901–1902	Preston North End	25	(4)
1903–1908	Tottenham Hotspur	126	(25)
1909–1910	Sheffield United	60	(5)
1911	Stalybridge Celtic		
- * Club domestic league appearances and goals

Joseph Walton (8 January 1881 – 1962) was an English professional footballer who played for Preston North End, Tottenham Hotspur, Sheffield United and Stalybridge Celtic.

== Career ==
Walton began his career at Preston North End, between 1901 and 1902 he made 25 League appearances and scored four goals. The outside right joined Tottenham Hotspur in May 1903. His debut occurred on 1 September 1903 in the London League against Woolwich Arsenal. He played a total of 218 times, scoring 51 goals including 28 Football league matches and scored on two goals in Tottenham debut in the football league. Walton signed for Sheffield United in 1909 and went on to score five goals in 60 League matches. After leaving Bramall Lane he joined Stalybridge Celtic where he ended his senior career.

== Bibliography ==
- Goodwin, Bob (1992). The Spurs Alphabet. ACL & Polar Publishing (UK) Ltd. ISBN 0-9514862-8-4.
