= 1902–03 Southern Football League =

The 1902–03 season was the ninth in the history of Southern League. Southampton won Division One for the 5th time in seven seasons. Fulham finished top of Division Two. No Southern League clubs applied to join the Football League.

== Division One ==
Southern Football League Division One
- Season: 1902–03
- Champions: Southampton (5th title)
- Promoted: none
- Relegated: Watford
- Matches: 240
- Goals: 715 (2.98 per match)

There were no new clubs in Division One this season.

| Pos | Team | Pld | W | D | L | GF | GA | GR | Pts | Qualification |
|---|---|---|---|---|---|---|---|---|---|---|
| 1 | Southampton | 30 | 20 | 8 | 2 | 83 | 20 | 4.150 | 48 | |
| 2 | Reading | 30 | 19 | 7 | 4 | 72 | 30 | 2.400 | 45 | |
| 3 | Portsmouth | 30 | 17 | 7 | 6 | 69 | 32 | 2.156 | 41 | |
| 4 | Tottenham Hotspur | 30 | 14 | 7 | 9 | 47 | 31 | 1.516 | 35 | |
| 5 | Bristol Rovers | 30 | 13 | 8 | 9 | 46 | 34 | 1.353 | 34 | |
| 6 | New Brompton | 30 | 11 | 11 | 8 | 37 | 35 | 1.057 | 33 | |
| 7 | Millwall Athletic (Note: Changed name to Millwall at end of season) | 30 | 14 | 3 | 13 | 52 | 37 | 1.405 | 31 | |
| 8 | Northampton Town | 30 | 12 | 6 | 12 | 39 | 48 | 0.813 | 30 | |
| 9 | Queens Park Rangers | 30 | 11 | 6 | 13 | 34 | 42 | 0.810 | 28 | |
| 10 | West Ham United | 30 | 9 | 10 | 11 | 35 | 49 | 0.714 | 28 | |
| 11 | Luton Town | 30 | 10 | 7 | 13 | 43 | 44 | 0.977 | 27 | |
| 12 | Swindon Town | 30 | 10 | 7 | 13 | 38 | 46 | 0.826 | 27 | |
| 13 | Kettering | 30 | 8 | 11 | 11 | 33 | 40 | 0.825 | 27 | |
| 14 | Wellingborough | 30 | 11 | 3 | 16 | 36 | 56 | 0.643 | 25 | |
| 15 | Watford | 30 | 6 | 4 | 20 | 35 | 87 | 0.402 | 16 | Relegation test matches |
| 16 | Brentford | 30 | 2 | 1 | 27 | 16 | 84 | 0.190 | 5 | Relegation test matches |

Source: rsssf.com
Rules for classification: The system of using goal average to separate two teams tied on points was used until the 1976-77 season. The points system: 2 points for a win, 1 point for a draw and 0 points for losing.

== Division Two ==
Southern Football League Division Two
- Season: 1902–03
- Champions: Fulham
- Promoted: Fulham; Brighton & Hove Albion
- Relegated: none
- Matches: 30
- Goals: 121 (4.03 per match)

There were also no new clubs in Division Two this season.

| Pos | Team | Pld | W | D | L | GF | GA | GR | Pts | Qualification |
|---|---|---|---|---|---|---|---|---|---|---|
| 1 | Fulham | 10 | 7 | 1 | 2 | 27 | 7 | 3.857 | 15 | Promotion test matches |
| 2 | Brighton & Hove Albion | 10 | 7 | 1 | 2 | 34 | 11 | 3.091 | 15 | Promotion test matches |
| 3 | Grays United | 10 | 7 | 0 | 3 | 28 | 12 | 2.333 | 14 | |
| 4 | Wycombe Wanderers | 10 | 3 | 3 | 4 | 13 | 19 | 0.684 | 9 | |
| 5 | Chesham Town | 10 | 2 | 1 | 7 | 9 | 37 | 0.243 | 5 | |
| 6 | Southall | 10 | 1 | 0 | 9 | 10 | 35 | 0.286 | 2 | |

Source: rsssf.com
Rules for classification: The system of using goal average to separate two teams tied on points was used until the 1976-77 season. The points system: 2 points for a win, 1 point for a draw and 0 points for losing.

== Promotion-relegation test matches ==
At the end of the season, test matches were held between the bottom two clubs in Division One and the top two clubs in Division Two. Brentford beat Fulham 7-2 to retain their place in Division One, although Fulham were promoted anyway after Division One was expanded to 18 clubs. Brighton beat Watford 5-3 in the other match, which saw the two clubs swap divisions.

| Division One clubs | v | Division Two clubs |

27 April 1903

| Brentford | 7 – 2 | Fulham |

Shepherd's Bush
27 April 1903

| Watford | 3 – 5 | Brighton & Hove Albion |

Memorial Grounds, West Ham
