= Oliver Burton =

English footballer

Personal information
- Date of birth: 27 May 1879
- Place of birth: Derby, England
- Date of death: 20 January 1929 (aged 51)
- Place of death: St Pancras, London
- Position: Left back

Senior career*
Years	Team	Apps	(Gls)
1904–1909	Tottenham Hotspur	133	(1)
- * Club domestic league appearances and goals

Oliver Burton (27 May 1879 – 20 January 1929) was an English professional footballer who played for Tottenham Hotspur.

== Football career ==
Burton, a left back, played a total of 133 matches for Tottenham Hotspur in all competitions between 1904 and 1909.

== Baseball ==
In 1906 the British Baseball Association re-introduced a 'National' baseball competition which was in effect dominated by the baseball teams of London football clubs. Baseball in the United Kingdom. Oliver Burton was in the Tottenham Hotspur team that won the League and Cup double. He had played in Derby County's baseball team in 1900, the last year baseball had previously been organised at national level.
