= Jack Eggett =

English footballer

Personal information
- Full name: John Henry Eggett
- Date of birth: 19 April 1874
- Place of birth: Wisbech, Cambridgeshire, England
- Date of death: Q3 July 1943 (aged 69)
- Place of death: Doncaster, England
- Position: Goalkeeper

Youth career
- Walsoken Victory
- Wisbech

Senior career*
Years	Team	Apps	(Gls)
1894–1903	Doncaster Rovers	67	(0)
1903–1904	Woolwich Arsenal	0	(0)
1904	West Ham United	0	(0)
1904–1907	Tottenham Hotspur	66	(0)
1907–1908	Croydon Common	56	(0)
1908–19??	Goole Town		
- * Club domestic league appearances and goals

John Henry Eggett (19 April 1874 − July 1943) was an English footballer who played as a goalkeeper with Doncaster Rovers in the Football League and Tottenham Hotspur in the Southern League.

== Playing career ==
=== Doncaster Rovers ===
Hailing from Wisbech, Cambridgeshire, he played for Walsoken Victory and Wisbech Town before being scouted and signed by Doncaster Rovers in 1894. Playing against Rotherham Town in a second round FA Cup tie in November 1895, he was fouled by an opposing forward and kicked him in retaliation. Eggett was sent off and later banned for six weeks, whilst Doncaster lost the home game 7–0. In December 1896, he missed the train to an away match at Wellingborough Town, but Rovers still managed to win despite starting the match with only 10 men.

He played every game in their debut season in the Football League in 1901, and missed only one game the following season. He made 70 Football League and FA Cup appearances for Rovers, plus many more in the Midland League over several seasons.

After they were relegated in 1903, he moved first to Woolwich Arsenal and then to West Ham United in January 1904, but made no first team appearances for either.

=== Tottenham Hotspur ===
In 1904, he was signed by Southern League club Tottenham Hotspur where he stayed for three seasons. Eggett debut was on 22 October 1904 in the Western League in away match against Portsmouth that Tottenham lost 1–0. In his first season at Spurs, he kept 24 out of 27 clean sheets, and 22 out of 34 in his second. After injury and losing his place to Matt Reilly he was released from the club in 1907.

=== Croydon Common ===
In 1907, Eggett moved to Croydon Common for one season, playing in their first ever League and Cup matches. He subsequently moved back north to play for Goole Town in 1908.

== Personal life ==
It is reported that his death towards the end of 1943 in Doncaster was at a charity event.

== Honours ==
Doncaster Rovers

- Midland League champions: 1896–97, 1898–99
- Midland League runners up: 1900–01
- Yorkshire League runners up: 1898–99

== Bibliography ==
- Soar, Phil (1995). Tottenham Hotspur The Official Illustrated History 1882–1995. Hamlyn. ISBN 0-600-58706-1.
- Goodwin, Bob (1992). The Spurs Alphabet. ACL & Polar Publishing (UK) Ltd. ISBN 0-9514862-8-4.
