= John Watson (footballer, born 1877) =

Scottish footballer

Personal information
- Full name: John Watson
- Date of birth: 1877
- Place of birth: Dundee, Scotland
- Position: Full-back

Senior career*
Years	Team	Apps	(Gls)
1896	Dundee Wanderers		
1896–1898	New Brompton	55	(2)
1899	Dundee	6	(0)
1900–1902	Everton	44	(0)
1902–1908	Tottenham Hotspur	104	(0)
Total		209	(2)
- * Club domestic league appearances and goals

John Watson (born 1877, date of death unknown) was a Scottish professional footballer at the turn of the twentieth century.

== Career ==
Born in Dundee, he played for Dundee Wanderers before relocating to England to join New Brompton of the Southern League, where he played regularly for two seasons. He then returned to Scotland to play for Dundee, before joining Everton, where he made 44 appearances in the Football League. He then moved on to Tottenham Hotspur, his last known club.
