= 1900–01 Tottenham Hotspur F.C. season =

English football club season

Tottenham Hotspur
1900–01 season
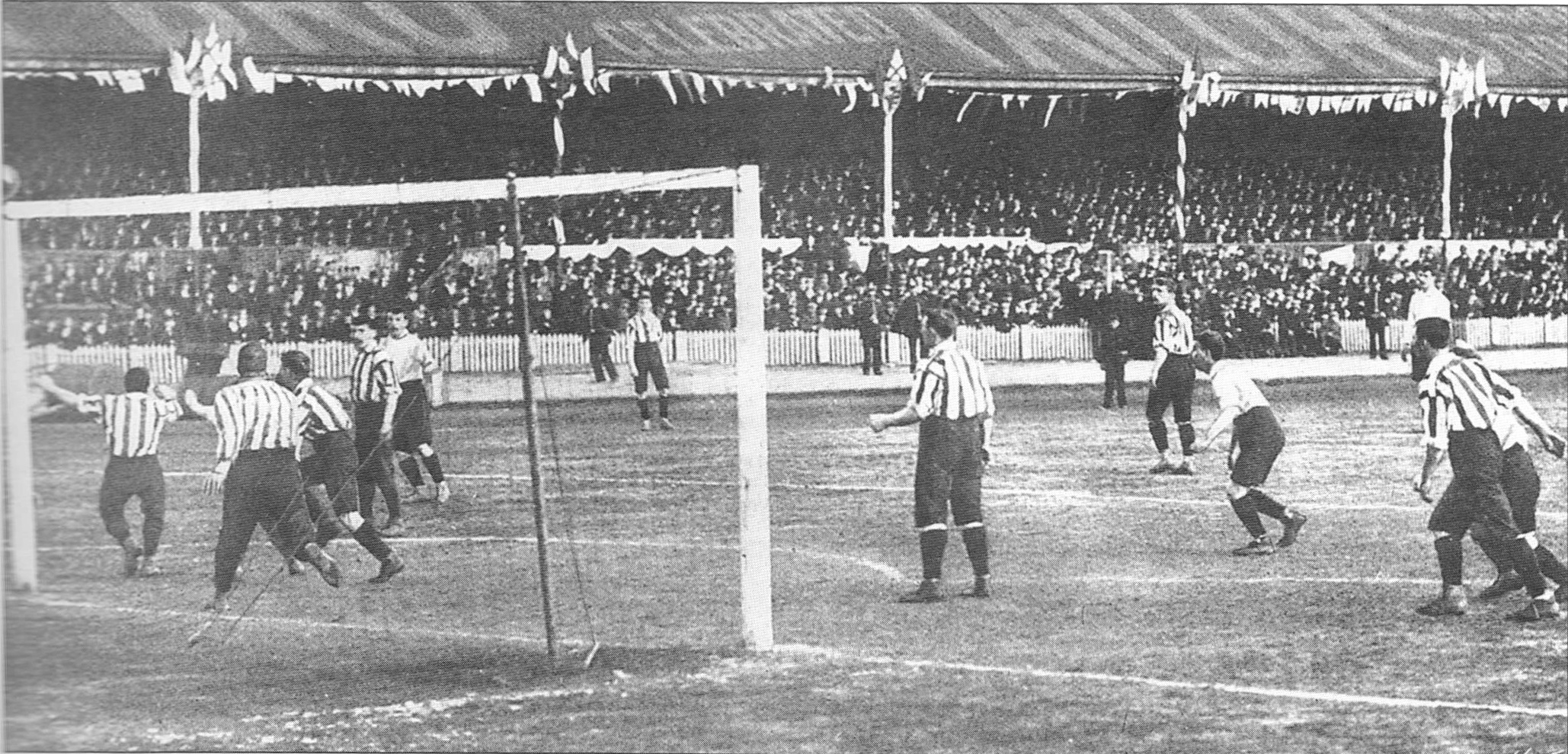
- Sandy Brown scored for Tottenham in the FA Cup replay
- Manager: John Cameron
- Stadium: White Hart Lane
- Southern League: 5th
- Western Football League: 3rd
- FA Cup: Winner

The 1900–01 season Tottenham Hotspur competed in the Southern Football League where they finished in 5th place. They also entered the Western League for the first time where they finished 3rd. This was the season in which Tottenham, classed as a non-league club at the time went on to win the FA Cup and still are the only non-league winners of the competition to date.

The club reached the final where they played Sheffield United. The first match was played at Crystal Palace in London which finished in a 2–2 draw. The replay was moved to Bolton and Spurs won the game 3–1.

== Squad ==
Note: Flags indicate national team as defined under FIFA eligibility rules; some limited exceptions apply. Players may hold more than one non-FIFA nationality.

Pos.	Nation	Player
GK	ENG	George Clawley
GK	SCO	David Haddow
DF	SCO	Harry Erentz
DF	SCO	Sandy Tait
DF	ENG	Jimmy Melia
DF	ENG	John Stephenson
DF	ENG	John Burton
MF	ENG	Tom Morris
MF	WAL	Ted Hughes
MF	WAL	Jack Jones
MF	SCO	Robert Stormont
MF	ENG	Tom Pangborn

Pos.	Nation	Player
MF	ENG	Len Hyde
MF	ENG	James Moles
MF	SCO	James McNaught
MF	ENG	Tom Smith
MF	NIR	Jack Kirwan
FW	ENG	Alfred Hawley
FW	SCO	Joe Moffatt
FW	ENG	Arthur Jones
FW	SCO	Sandy Brown
FW	SCO	John Cameron
FW	SCO	David Copeland
FW	ENG	Vivian Woodward

== Transfers ==
=== In ===
Date from	Position	Nationality	Name	From	Fee	Ref.
1900	FW	(Scotland)	Joe Moffatt	Walsall	Unknown	
March 1901	FW	(England)	Vivian Woodward	Chelmsford City	Unknown	
April 1901	DF	(England)	John Wallance Stephenson	Swindon Town	Unknown	
April 1901	GK	(Wales)	Fred Griffiths	Millwall	Unknown	

=== Out ===
Date from	Position	Nationality	Name	To	Fee	Ref.
January 1901	FW	(England)	Tom Pangborn	Reading	Unknown	

== Competitions ==
=== Southern Football League ===
==== Table ====
Pos	Team	Pld	W	D	L	GF	GA	GR	Pts
3	Portsmouth	28	17	4	7	56	32	1.750	38
4	Millwall Athletic	28	17	2	9	55	32	1.719	36
5	Tottenham Hotspur	28	16	4	8	55	33	1.667	36
6	West Ham United	28	14	5	9	40	28	1.429	33
7	Bristol Rovers	28	14	4	10	46	35	1.314	32

Rules for classification: The system of using goal average to separate two teams tied on points was used up until the 1976-77 season. The points system: 2 points for a win, 1 point for a draw and 0 points for losing.

==== Results ====
1 September 1900 1	Tottenham Hotspur	0–3	Millwall Athletic	Tottenham, London
				Stadium: White Hart Lane

22 September 1900 2	Bristol City	1–1	Tottenham Hotspur	Bristol, England
				Stadium: St John's Lane

29 September 1900 3	Tottenham Hotspur	2–0	Swindon Town	Tottenham, London
				Stadium: White Hart Lane

6 October 1900 4	Watford	2–1	Tottenham Hotspur	Watford, Hertfordshire

20 October 1900 5	Queens Park Rangers	2–1	Tottenham Hotspur	Kensal Rise, London
				Stadium: Kensal Rise Athletic Ground

27 October 1900 6	Tottenham Hotspur	0–0	West Ham United	Tottenham, London
				Stadium: White Hart Lane

10 November 1900 7	New Brompton	1–2	Tottenham Hotspur	Gillingham, Kent
				Stadium: Priestfield Stadium

24 November 1900 8	Reading	3–1	Tottenham Hotspur	Reading, Berkshire
				Stadium: Elm Park (stadium)

1 December 1900 9	Tottenham Hotspur	1–0	Kettering	Tottenham, London
				Stadium: White Hart Lane

15 December 1900 10	Millwall Athletic	1–2	Tottenham Hotspur	Isle of Dogs, London
				Stadium: The Athletic Grounds

25 December 1900 11	Tottenham Hotspur	4–1	Portsmouth	Tottenham, London
				Stadium: White Hart Lane

26 December 1900 12	Southampton	3–1	Tottenham Hotspur	Southampton, England
				Stadium: The Dell

12 January 1901 13	Swindon Town	1–1	Tottenham Hotspur	Swindon, England
				Stadium: County Ground

19 January 1901 14	Tottenham Hotspur	7–0	Watford	Tottenham, London
				Stadium: White Hart Lane

26 January 1901 15	Tottenham Hotspur	4–0	Bristol Rovers	Tottenham, London
				Stadium: White Hart Lane

16 February 1901 16	West Ham United	1–4	Tottenham Hotspur	West Ham, London
				Stadium: Memorial Grounds

2 March 1901 17	Tottenham Hotspur	2–1	New Brompton	Tottenham, London
				Stadium: White Hart Lane

9 March 1901 18	Bristol Rovers	1–0	Tottenham Hotspur	Bristol, England
				Stadium: Eastville Stadium

16 March 1901 19	Tottenham Hotspur	1–0	Reading	Tottenham, London
				Stadium: White Hart Lane

30 March 1901 20	Tottenham Hotspur	4–1	Queens Park Rangers	Tottenham, London
				Stadium: White Hart Lane

3 April 1901 21	Gravesend United	2–1	Tottenham Hotspur	Kent, England
				Stadium: Overcliffe Ground

5 April 1901 22	Tottenham Hotspur	1–0	Southampton	Tottenham, London
				Stadium: White Hart Lane

6 April 1901 23	Tottenham Hotspur	1–0	Bristol City	Tottenham, London
				Stadium: White Hart Lane

24 April 1901 24	Portsmouth	4–0	Tottenham Hotspur	Portsmouth, England
				Stadium: Fratton Park

25 April 1901 25	Tottenham Hotspur	3–2	Luton Town	Tottenham, London
				Stadium: White Hart Lane

27 April 1901 26	Tottenham Hotspur	5–0	Gravesend United	Tottenham, London
				Stadium: White Hart Lane
Note: Tottenham Hotspur Reserves played the game as the first team played in the FA Cup final on the same day.

29 April 1901 27	Luton Town	2–4	Tottenham Hotspur	Luton, England
				Stadium: Dunstable Road

30 April 1901 28	Kettering Town	1–1	Tottenham Hotspur

=== Western League ===
In Tottenham's first outing in the Western League the team went on an unbeaten 11-game run, then on 27 March 1901 they sent their reserve team to play Bristol City in the league as the first team was to play Reading in the FA Cup the following day. A further two losses away against Portsmouth and Bristol Rovers, resulted in Tottenham finishing 3rd in the table.

==== Table ====
Pos	Team	Pld	W	D	L	GF	GA	GR	Pts	Result
1	Portsmouth	16	11	2	3	36	23	1.565	24	
2	Millwall Athletic	16	9	5	2	33	14	2.357	23	
3	Tottenham Hotspur	16	8	5	3	37	19	1.947	21	
4	Queens Park Rangers	16	7	4	5	39	24	1.625	18	
5	Bristol City	16	6	4	6	27	24	1.125	16	Elected to the Football League Second Division
6	Reading	16	5	5	6	23	31	0.742	15	
7	Southampton	16	5	2	9	19	29	0.655	12	
8	Bristol Rovers	16	4	1	11	18	42	0.429	9	
9	Swindon Town	16	2	2	12	9	35	0.257	6	

==== Results ====
17 November 1900 1	Tottenham Hotspur	8–1	Portsmouth	Tottenham, London
				Stadium: White Hart Lane

26 November 1900 2	Tottenham Hotspur	4–1	Bristol City	Tottenham, London
				Stadium: White Hart Lane

5 December 1900 3	Swindon Town	0–1	Tottenham Hotspur	Swindon, England
				Stadium: County Ground

8 December 1900 4	Tottenham Hotspur	1–1	Millwall Athletic	Tottenham, London
				Stadium: White Hart Lane

10 December 1900 5	Tottenham Hotspur	6–0	Bristol Rovers	Tottenham, London
				Stadium: White Hart Lane

22 December 1900 6	Tottenham Hotspur	2–0	Southampton	Tottenham, London
				Stadium: White Hart Lane

18 February 1901 7	Tottenham Hotspur	3–2	Reading	Tottenham, London
				Stadium: White Hart Lane

27 February 1901 8	Tottenham Hotspur	5–0	Swindon Town	Tottenham, London
				Stadium: White Hart Lane

6 March 1901 9	Reading	1–1	Tottenham Hotspur	Reading, England
				Stadium: Elm Park

11 March 1901 10	Southampton	1–1	Tottenham Hotspur	Southampton, England
				Stadium: The Dell

18 March 1901 11	Queens Park Rangers	1–1	Tottenham Hotspur	Kensal Rise Athletic Ground

27 March 1901 12	Bristol City	4–1	Tottenham Hotspur	Bristol, England
				Stadium: Ashton Gate
Note: Reserves played this fixture as first team played in the FA Cup.

13 April 1901 13	Millwall Athletic	0–1	Tottenham Hotspur	Isle of Dogs, London
				Stadium: The Athletic Grounds

15 April 1901 14	Tottenham Hotspur	2–2	Queens Park Rangers	Tottenham, London
				Stadium: White Hart Lane

17 April 1901 15	Portsmouth	1–0	Tottenham Hotspur	Portsmouth, England
				Stadium: Fratton Park

22 April 1901 16	Bristol Rovers	4–0	Tottenham Hotspur	Bristol, England
				Stadium: Eastville Stadium

=== FA Cup ===
Sheffield United where considered the favourites with nine English internationals on their team. In the first game that finished 2–2 Sheffield were considered lucky as their second goal was classed as controversial. The linesman had indicated it should be a corner after George Clawley saved a shot from Walter Bennett however the referee over-ruled him for and pointed to the centre circle indicating it had been a goal. The reply which both teams wanted to be played at Villa Park, was instead played at Bolton where Tottenham won 3–1.

==== Results ====
9 February 1901 R1	Tottenham Hotspur	1–1	Preston North End	Tottenham, London

13 February 1901 R1 - Replay	Preston North End	2–4	Tottenham Hotspur

23 February 1901 R2	Tottenham Hotspur	2–1	Bury	Tottenham, London

23 March 1901 R3	Reading	1–1	Tottenham Hotspur

27 March 1901 R3 - Replay	Tottenham Hotspur	3–0	Reading	Tottenham, London

8 April 1901 SF	Tottenham Hotspur	4–0	West Bromwich Albion	Birmingham
15:00				Stadium: Villa Park

20 April 1901 Final	Tottenham Hotspur	2–2	Sheffield United	Crystal Palace, London
15:30	Brown 23', 51'		Priest 10'; Bennett 52'	Stadium: Old Crystal Palace ground Attendance: 114,815; Referee: A. Kingscott

27 April 1901 Final - Replay	Tottenham Hotspur	3–1	Sheffield United	Bolton
15:00	Cameron 52'; Smith 76'; Brown 87'		Priest 40'	Stadium: Burnden Park; Attendance: 20,470; Referee: A. Kingscott

== Bibliography ==
- Soar, Phil (1995). Tottenham Hotspur The Official Illustrated History 1882–1995. Hamlyn. ISBN 0-600-58706-1.
- Goodwin, Bob (1992). The Spurs Alphabet. ACL & Polar Publishing (UK) Ltd. ISBN 0-9514862-8-4.
