= 1901–02 Tottenham Hotspur F.C. season =

English football club season

Tottenham Hotspur
1901–02 season
- Player-Manager: John Cameron
- Stadium: White Hart Lane
- Southern League: 2nd
- Western League: 2nd
- London League: 2nd
- FA Cup: First round
- Top goalscorer: Alex Brown (18)
- Biggest win: 8–1 v Watford, 26 October 1901, Southern League
Home colours

The 1901–02 season was Tottenham's sixth season as a fully professional club and their 19th year in existence. They competed in three leagues and the FA Cup. The primary focus was the Southern League with a midweek feature in the Western League. The club also competed in the London League for the first time with their reserve players.

In the Southern League over the course of the first 11 games they had only lost to Northampton Town and drawn one. One of the most impressive wins was at home against Watford in which Tottenham had scored eight goals. Their form faulted in December but picked up again after that. Towards the end of the season their form faulted yet again and with it their chance to win the competition. In fact the winners of the league Portsmouth beat them in both home and away matches. In the end Tottenham finished in second place.

The Western League became a similar story to the Southern League. Tottenham had a seven-game unbeaten run and came up against Portsmouth yet again only to lose. A big loss to Southampton and a draw away at Reading hampered their chance to win the Western League. They narrowly missed out here with Portsmouth accumulating more points winning yet another title, leaving Tottenham sitting in second place.

In the London League Tottenham reserve players managed enough to finish in second place.

In the FA Cup Tottenham were drawn against Southampton and it took three games to settle the score. A draw home and away and to settle the matter both clubs had to go to Elm Park in Reading. Southampton settled the matter by winning 2–1. They then went on a run to reach the FA Cup final against Sheffield United. Which had to be replayed after the first match was a draw, but lost the second match.

== Squad ==
Note: Flags indicate national team as defined under FIFA eligibility rules; some limited exceptions apply. Players may hold more than one non-FIFA nationality.

| Pos. | Nation | Player |
|---|---|---|
| GK | ENG | George Clawley |
| GK | WAL | Fred Griffiths |
| DF | ENG | John Burton |
| DF | SCO | Harry Erentz |
| DF | SCO | Sandy Tait |
| DF | ENG | John Stephenson |
| MF | WAL | Ted Hughes |
| MF | ENG | Tom Morris |
| MF | NIR | Jack Kirwan |
| MF | SCO | Patrick Gilhooley |
| MF | ENG | Len Hyde |
| MF | WAL | Jack Jones |

| Pos. | Nation | Player |
|---|---|---|
| MF | SCO | James McNaught |
| MF | ENG | James Moles |
| MF | ENG | Thomas Soulsby |
| MF | ENG | Tom Smith |
| MF | ENG | Alan Haig-Brown |
| FW | ENG | John Barlow |
| FW | ENG | Vivian Woodward |
| FW | SCO | Thomas Fitchie |
| FW | SCO | David Copeland |
| FW | SCO | Sandy Brown |
| FW | SCO | John Cameron |

== Transfers ==
=== In ===
| Date from | Position | Nationality | Name | From | Fee | Ref. |
|---|---|---|---|---|---|---|
| 1901 | MF | (England) | Thomas Soulsby | Liverpool | Unknown | (Note: Thomas Soulsby was signed from Liverpool who had played in the reserves. He only made two appearances for Tottenham, one London League match and one friendly.) |
| September 1901 | MF | (Scotland) | Patrick Gilhooley | Sheffield United | Unknown | |
| April 1902 | FW | (Scotland) | Thomas Fitchie | | Guest appearance | (Note: Thomas Fitichie who was an amateur was free to play for any club. He chose to play for Tottenham Hotspur in April 1902 playing in one Southern League game against Luton Town. This game occurred on 12 April 1902 which ended in a 0–0 draw. He played in one other friendly game for Tottenham against Sheffield United, which occurred on 1 April 1902 which finished 3–2 in Spurs favour, with Fitichie scoring one of the goals.) |

=== Out ===
| Date from | Position | Nationality | Name | To | Fee | Ref. |
|---|---|---|---|---|---|---|
| March 1902 | GK | (Wales) | Fred Griffiths | Preston North End | Unknown | |

== Competitions ==
=== Southern League ===
==== Table ====
| Pos | Team | Pld | W | D | L | GF | GA | GR | Pts |
|---|---|---|---|---|---|---|---|---|---|
| 1 | Portsmouth | 30 | 20 | 7 | 3 | 67 | 24 | 2.792 | 47 |
| 2 | Tottenham Hotspur | 30 | 18 | 6 | 6 | 61 | 22 | 2.773 | 42 |
| 3 | Southampton | 30 | 18 | 6 | 6 | 71 | 28 | 2.536 | 42 |
| 4 | West Ham United | 30 | 17 | 6 | 7 | 45 | 28 | 1.607 | 40 |
| 5 | Reading | 30 | 16 | 7 | 7 | 57 | 24 | 2.375 | 39 |

Source: rsssf.com
Rules for classification: The system of using goal average to separate two teams tied on points was used until the 1976-77 season. The points system: 2 points for a win, 1 point for a draw and 0 points for losing.

==== Results ====
| 7 September 1901 1 | Tottenham Hotspur | 2–0 | Millwall | Tottenham, London |
| | | | | Stadium: White Hart Lane |

| 14 September 1901 2 | Tottenham Hotspur | 2–0 | Queen Park Rangers | Tottenham, London |
| | | | | Stadium: White Hart Lane |

| 21 September 1901 3 | Reading | 1–1 | Tottenham Hotspur | Reading, Berkshire |
| | | | | Stadium: Elm Park |

| 5 October 1901 4 | Bristol Rovers | 1–2 | Tottenham Hotspur | Eastville, Bristol |
| | | | | Stadium: Eastville Stadium |

| 12 October 1901 5 | Tottenham Hotspur | 3–1 | New Brompton | Tottenham, London |
| | | | | Stadium: White Hart Lane |

| 19 October 1901 6 | Northampton Town | 3–1 | Tottenham Hotspur | Northampton |
| | | | | Stadium: County Cricket Ground |

| 26 October 1901 7 | Tottenham Hotspur | 8–1 | Watford | Tottenham, London |
| | | | | Stadium: White Hart Lane |

| 2 November 1901 8 | West Ham United | 0–1 | Tottenham Hotspur | West Ham, London |
| | | | | Stadium: Memorial Grounds |

| 9 November 1901 9 | Wellingborough | 0–1 | Tottenham Hotspur | Wellingborough, Northamptonshire |

| 23 November 1901 10 | Swindon Town | 1–3 | Tottenham Hotspur | Swindon, Wiltshire |
| | | | | Stadium: County Ground |

| 7 December 1901 11 | Kettering Town | 0–2 | Tottenham Hotspur | Kettering, Northamptonshire |
| | | | | Stadium: Rockingham Road |

| 21 December 1901 12 | Millwall | 1–1 | Tottenham Hotspur | Isle of Dogs, London |
| | | | | Stadium: North Greenwich |

| 25 December 1901 13 | Tottenham Hotspur | 1–2 | Portsmouth | Tottenham, London |
| | | | | Stadium: White Hart Lane |

| 26 December 1901 14 | Southampton | 1–0 | Tottenham Hotspur | Southampton, Hampshire |
| | Wood | | | Stadium: The Dell |

| 28 December 1901 15 | Queens Park Rangers | 0–3 | Tottenham Hotspur | North Kensington, London |
| | | | | Stadium: Latimer Road |

| 4 January 1902 16 | Tottenham Hotspur | 4–2 | Reading | Tottenham, London |
| | | | | Stadium: White Hart Lane |

| 18 January 1902 17 | Tottenham Hotspur | 1–0 | Bristol Rovers | Tottenham, London |
| | | | | Stadium: White Hart Lane |

| 1 February 1902 18 | Tottenham Hotspur | 1–0 | Northampton Town | Tottenham, London |
| | | | | Stadium: White Hart Lane |

| 8 February 1902 19 | Watford | 0–3 | Tottenham Hotspur | Watford, Hertfordshire |
| | | | | Stadium: Cassio Road |

| 15 February 1902 20 | Tottenham Hotspur | 1–2 | West Ham United | Tottenham, London |
| | | | | Stadium: White Hart Lane |

| 22 February 1902 21 | Tottenham Hotspur | 3–0 | Wellingborough | Tottenham, London |
| | | | | Stadium: White Hart Lane |

| 8 March 1902 22 | Tottenham Hotspur | 7–1 | Swindon Town | Tottenham, London |
| | | | | Stadium: White Hart Lane |

| 15 March 1902 23 | Brentford | 2–1 | Tottenham Hotspur | , London |
| | Logan; Shanks | | | Stadium: York Road |

| 22 March 1902 24 | Tottenham Hotspur | 4–0 | Kettering Town | Tottenham, London |
| | | | | Stadium: White Hart Lane |

| 28 March 1902 25 | Tottenham Hotspur | 2–2 | Southampton | Tottenham, London |
| | | | A. Turner; J. Turner | Stadium: White Hart Lane |

| 29 March 1902 26 | Luton Town | 0–0 | Tottenham Hotspur | Luton, Hertfordshire |
| | | | | Stadium: Dunstable Road |

| 31 March 1902 27 | Portsmouth | 1–0 | Tottenham Hotspur | Portsmouth, Hampshire |
| | | | | Stadium: Fratton Park |

| 5 April 1902 28 | New Brompton | 0–0 | Tottenham Hotspur | Gillingham, Kent |
| | | | | Stadium: Priestfield Stadium |

| 12 April 1902 29 | Tottenham Hotspur | 0–0 | Luton Town | Tottenham, London |
| | | | | Stadium: White Hart Lane |

| 26 April 1902 30 | Tottenham Hotspur | 3–0 | Brentford | Tottenham, London |
| | | | | Stadium: White Hart Lane |

=== Western League ===
==== Table ====
| Pos | Team | Pld | W | D | L | GF | GA | GR | Pts | Result |
|---|---|---|---|---|---|---|---|---|---|---|
| 1 | Portsmouth | 16 | 13 | 1 | 2 | 53 | 16 | 3.313 | 27 | |
| 2 | Tottenham Hotspur | 16 | 11 | 3 | 2 | 42 | 17 | 2.471 | 25 | |
| 3 | Reading | 16 | 7 | 3 | 6 | 29 | 22 | 1.318 | 17 | |
| 4 | Millwall Athletic | 16 | 8 | 1 | 7 | 25 | 29 | 0.862 | 17 | |
| 5 | Bristol Rovers | 16 | 8 | 0 | 8 | 25 | 31 | 0.806 | 16 | |
| 6 | Southampton | 16 | 7 | 1 | 8 | 30 | 28 | 1.071 | 15 | |
| 7 | West Ham United | 16 | 6 | 2 | 8 | 30 | 20 | 1.500 | 14 | |
| 8 | Queens Park Rangers | 16 | 5 | 1 | 10 | 17 | 43 | 0.395 | 11 | |
| 9 | Swindon Town | 16 | 0 | 2 | 14 | 8 | 53 | 0.151 | 2 | Left league at end of season |

==== Results ====
| 9 September 1901 1 | Tottenham Hotspur | 4–0 | Reading | Tottenham, London |
| | | | | Stadium: White Hart Lane |

| 28 September 1901 2 | Tottenham Hotspur | 5–0 | Southampton | Tottenham, London |
| | | | | Stadium: White Hart Lane |

| 30 September 1901 3 | Queens Park Rangers | 1–3 | Tottenham Hotspur | North Kensington, London |
| | | | | Stadium: Latimer Road |

| 7 October 1901 4 | Tottenham Hotspur | 3–1 | Millwall | Tottenham, London |
| | | | | Stadium: White Hart Lane |

| 14 October 1901 5 | Tottenham Hotspur | 2–1 | West Ham United | Tottenham, London |
| | | | | Stadium: White Hart Lane |

| 21 October 1901 6 | Tottenham Hotspur | 4–1 | Bristol Rovers | Tottenham, London |
| | | | | Stadium: White Hart Lane |

| 11 November 1901 7 | Tottenham Hotspur | 6–0 | Swindon Town | Tottenham, London |
| | | | | Stadium: White Hart Lane |

| 16 November 1901 8 | Portsmouth | 3–1 | Tottenham Hotspur | Portsmouth, Hampshire |
| | | | | Stadium: Fratton Park |

| 18 November 1901 9 | Bristol Rovers | 0–4 | Tottenham Hotspur | Eastville, Bristol |
| | | | | Stadium: Eastville Stadium |

| 9 December 1901 10 | Tottenham Hotspur | 3–2 | Queens Park Rangers | Tottenham, London |
| | | | | Stadium: White Hart Lane |

| 11 January 1902 11 | Southampton | 5–1 | Tottenham Hotspur | Southampton, Hampshire |
| | | | | Stadium: The Dell |

| 15 January 1902 12 | Reading | 1–1 | Tottenham Hotspur | Reading, Berkshire |
| | | | | Stadium: Elm Park |

| 17 February 1902 13 | Millwall | 1–3 | Tottenham Hotspur | Isle of Dogs, London |
| | | | | Stadium: North Greenwich |

| 10 March 1902 14 | West Ham United | 1–1 | Tottenham Hotspur | West Ham, London |
| | | | | Stadium: Memorial Grounds |

| 17 March 1902 15 | Tottenham Hotspur | 0–0 | Portsmouth | Tottenham, London |
| | | | | Stadium: White Hart Lane |

| 9 April 1902 16 | Swindon Town | 0–1 | Tottenham Hotspur | Swindon, Wiltshire |
| | | | | Stadium: County Ground |

=== London League ===
==== Table ====
| Pos | Club | P | W | D | L | F | A | Pts |
|---|---|---|---|---|---|---|---|---|
| 1 | West Ham United | 8 | 5 | 1 | 2 | 18 | 9 | 11 |
| 2 | Tottenham Hotspur | 8 | 3 | 3 | 2 | 15 | 13 | 9 |
| 3 | Millwall | 8 | 2 | 4 | 2 | 9 | 13 | 8 |
| 4 | Queens Park Rangers | 8 | 2 | 2 | 4 | 11 | 14 | 6 |
| 5 | Woolwich Arsenal | 8 | 2 | 2 | 4 | 9 | 13 | 6 |

==== Results ====
| 16 September 1901 1 | Woolwich Arsenal | 0–2 | Tottenham Hotspur | Plumstead, London |
| | | | | Stadium: Manor Ground |

| 4 November 1901 2 | Tottenham Hotspur | 5–0 | Woolwich Arsenal | Tottenham, London |
| | | | | Stadium: White Hart Lane |

| 16 December 1901 3 | West Ham United | 3–1 | Tottenham Hotspur | Canning Town, London |
| | | | | Stadium: Memorial Grounds |

| 6 January 1902 4 | Millwall | 1–1 | Tottenham Hotspur | Isle of Dogs, London |
| | | | | Stadium: North Greenwich |

| 10 February 1902 5 | Tottenham Hotspur | 1–5 | Queens Park Rangers | Tottenham, London |
| | | | | Stadium: White Hart Lane |

| 24 March 1902 6 | Tottenham Hotspur | 1–1 | Millwall | Tottenham, London |
| | | | | Stadium: White Hart Lane |

| 14 April 1902 7 | Queens Park Rangers | 1–2 | Tottenham Hotspur | North Kensington, London |
| | | | | Stadium: Latimer Road |

| 21 April 1902 8 | Tottenham Hotspur | 2–2 | West Ham United | Tottenham, London |
| | | | | Stadium: White Hart Lane |

=== FA Cup ===
==== Results ====
| 25 January 1902 Round one | Tottenham Hotspur | 1–1 | Southampton | Tottenham, London |
| | Copeland | | Bowman | Stadium: White Hart Lane; Attendance: 25,000 |

| 29 January 1902 Round one replay | Southampton | 2–2 | Tottenham Hotspur | Southampton, Hampshire |
| | Chadwick; J. Turner | | Hughes | Stadium: The Dell; Attendance: 10,000 |

| 3 February 1902 Round one replay | Southampton | 2–1 | Tottenham Hotspur | Reading, Berkshire |
| | A. Turner; Brown | | Kirwan | Stadium: Elm Park; Attendance: 10,000 |

== Bibliography ==
- Soar, Phil (1995). Tottenham Hotspur The Official Illustrated History 1882–1995. Hamlyn. ISBN 0-600-58706-1.
- Goodwin, Bob (1992). The Spurs Alphabet. ACL & Polar Publishing (UK) Ltd. ISBN 0-9514862-8-4.
