= 1899–1900 Tottenham Hotspur F.C. season =

English football club season

Tottenham Hotspur
1899–1900 season
- Stadium: White Hart Lane
- Southern League: Champions
- Southern District Combination: 2nd
- FA Cup: First round
- Top goalscorer: Tom Pratt (19)

The 1899–1900 season was Tottenham's fourth season as a fully professional club and the 17th year in existence. After overcrowding at Northumberland Park, Tottenham moved into their new stadium of White Hart Lane. Their first record game at the ground was a friendly in which they hosted Notts County with 5,000 spectators in a 4–1 spectacle.

Tottenham had a successful campaign in the Southern League winning the competition. They also played in the Southern District Combination league were they came second.

== Squad ==
Note: Flags indicate national team as defined under FIFA eligibility rules; some limited exceptions apply. Players may hold more than one non-FIFA nationality.

Pos.	Nation	Player
GK	ENG	George Clawley
GK	RSA	Wilf Waller
GK	SCO	David Haddow
DF	SCO	Harry Erentz
DF	ENG	Jimmy Melia
DF	SCO	Sandy Tait
MF	ENG	Tom Smith
MF	WAL	Jack Jones
MF	ENG	Len Hyde

Pos.	Nation	Player
MF	WAL	Ted Hughes
MF	ENG	Tom Morris
MF	NIR	Jack Kirwan
MF	SCO	Robert Stormont
MF	SCO	James McNaught
FW	ENG	Tom Pratt
FW	SCO	David Copeland
FW	SCO	John Cameron
FW	ENG	Arthur Rule

== Transfers ==
=== In ===
Date from	Position	Nationality	Name	From	Fee	Ref.
1899	GK	(England)	George Clawley	Stoke	Unknown	
1899	DF	(England)	Tom Morris		Unknown	
March 1899	FW	(England)	Arthur Rule	Sheppey United	Unknown	
May 1899	FW	(Scotland)	David Copeland	Bedminster	Unknown	
May 1899	DF	(Scotland)	Sandy Tait	Preston North End	Unknown	
May 1899	MF	(England)	Len Hyde	Wellingborough Town	Unknown	
April 1899	FW	(England)	Tom Pratt	Preston North End	Unknown	
July 1899	DF	(Wales)	Ted Hughes	Everton	Unknown	
July 1899	MF	(Northern Ireland)	Jack Kirwan	Everton	Unknown	
November 1899	GK	(Scotland)	David Haddow		Unknown	

== Competitions ==
=== Southern League ===
==== Table ====
Pos	Team	Pld	W	D	L	GF	GA	GR	Pts	Qualification or relegation
1	Tottenham Hotspur	28	20	4	4	67	26	2.577	44	
2	Portsmouth	28	20	1	7	59	29	2.034	41	Directly elected into Division One (Note: Portsmouth founded 5 April 1898, before Royal Artillery Portsmouth disbanded in 1899.)
3	Southampton	28	17	1	10	70	33	2.121	35	
4	Reading	28	15	2	11	41	28	1.464	32	
5	Swindon Town	28	15	2	11	50	42	1.190	32	

Source: rsssf.com
Rules for classification: The system of using goal average to separate two teams tied on points was used up until the 1976–77 season (note: source does not refer to goal average). The points system: 2 points for a win, 1 point for a draw and 0 points for losing.

==== Results ====
2 September 1899 1	Millwall	1–3	Tottenham Hotspur	Isle of Dogs, London
				Stadium: The Athletic Grounds

9 September 1899 2	Tottenham Hotspur	1–0	Queens Park Rangers	Tottenham, London
				Stadium: White Hart Lane

16 September 1899 3	Chatham	2–3	Tottenham Hotspur	Chatham, Kent
				Stadium: Maidstone Road

23 September 1899 4	Tottenham Hotspur	2–1	Reading	Tottenham, London
				Stadium: White Hart Lane

2 October 1899 5	Tottenham Hotspur	4–0	Gravesend United	Tottenham, London
				Stadium: White Hart Lane

7 October 1899 6	Tottenham Hotspur	6–1 (Note: Game void after Brighton United resigned from the Southern League on 10 March 1900.)	Brighton United	Tottenham, London
				Stadium: White Hart Lane

14 October 1899 7	Bedminster	2–1	Tottenham Hotspur	Ashton Gate, Bristol
				Stadium: Ashton Gate Stadium

21 October 1899 8	Tottenham Hotspur	1–0 (Note: Tottenham against Bristol Rovers: Game was abandoned after 55 minutes.)	Bristol Rovers	Tottenham, London
				Stadium: White Hart Lane

4 November 1899 9	Tottenham Hotspur	1–0	Thames Ironworks	Tottenham, London
				Stadium: White Hart Lane

2 December 1899 10	Swindon Town	0–2	Tottenham Hotspur	Swindon, Wiltshire
				Stadium: County Ground

9 December 1899 11	Tottenham Hotspur	2–2	Bristol City	Tottenham, London
				Stadium: White Hart Lane

16 December 1899 12	Cowes	1–6 (Note: Cowes Football Club resigned from the Southern League on 18 December 1899 due to financial reasons.)	Tottenham Hotspur	Isle of Wight

25 December 1899 13	Tottenham Hotspur	3–0	Portsmouth	Tottenham, London
				Stadium: White Hart Lane

26 December 1899 14	Southampton	3–1	Tottenham Hotspur	Southampton, Hampshire
				Stadium: The Dell

30 December 1899 15	Tottenham Hotspur	2–1	Millwall	Tottenham, London
				Stadium: White Hart Lane

6 January 1900 16	Queens Park Rangers	0–0	Tottenham Hotspur	Kensal Green, London
				Stadium: Kensal Rise Athletic Ground

13 January 1900 17	Tottenham Hotspur	2–1	Chatham	Tottenham, London
				Stadium: White Hart Lane

20 January 1900 18	Reading	0–1	Tottenham Hotspur	Reading, Berkshire
				Stadium: Elm Park

3 February 1900 19	Sheppey United	1–4	Tottenham Hotspur	Isle of Sheppey, Kent
				Stadium: Botany Road

10 February 1900 20	Brighton United	0–3	Tottenham Hotspur	Brighton, Sussex

17 February 1900 21	Tottenham Hotspur	5–2	Bedminster	Tottenham, London
				Stadium: White Hart Lane

24 February 1900 23	Bristol Rovers	2–2	Tottenham Hotspur	Bath, Somerset
				Stadium: Twerton Park

3 March 1900 24	Portsmouth	1–0	Tottenham Hotspur	Portsmouth, Hampshire
				Stadium: Fratton Park

10 March 1900 25	Thames Ironworks	0–0	Tottenham Hotspur	West Ham, London
				Stadium: Memorial Grounds

19 March 1900 26	Tottenham Hotspur	5–1	Bristol Rovers	Tottenham, London
				Stadium: White Hart Lane

24 March 1900 27	Tottenham Hotspur	1–0	New Brompton	Tottenham, London
				Stadium: White Hart Lane

31 March 1900 28	Gravesend United	2–6	Tottenham Hotspur	Gravesend, Kent
				Stadium: Overcliffe Ground

7 April 1900 29	Tottenham Hotspur	3–0	Swindon Town	Tottenham, London
				Stadium: White Hart Lane

13 April 1900 30	Tottenham Hotspur	2–0	Southampton	Tottenham, London
				Stadium: White Hart Lane

14 April 1900 31	Bristol City	3–0	Tottenham Hotspur	Bristol, Gloucestershire
				Stadium: St John's Lane

16 April 1900 32	Tottenham Hotspur	3–0	Sheppey United	Tottenham, London
				Stadium: White Hart Lane

=== Southern District Combination League ===
==== Table ====
Pos	Club	P	W	D	L	F	A	Pts
1	Millwall	16	12	2	2	30	10	26
2	Tottenham Hotspur	15	10	3	2	40	16	23
3	Portsmouth	16	9	2	5	30	16	20
4	Woolwich Arsenal	15	7	1	7	25	21	15
5	Bristol City	16	5	3	8	25	32	13
6	Southampton	16	5	2	9	23	30	12
7	Reading	16	4	4	8	16	28	12
8	Chatham	16	5	2	9	12	35	12
9	Queens Park Rangers	16	4	1	11	19	28	9

Note: The match between Woolwich Arsenal and Tottenham Hotspur played on 24 April 1900 was abandoned after 55 minutes due to crowd trouble. Arsenal were ahead 2–1.

==== Results ====
18 September 1899 1	Tottenham Hotspur	2–0	Portsmouth	Tottenham, London
				Stadium: White Hart Lane

11 October 1899 2	Reading	2–1	Tottenham Hotspur	Reading, Berkshire
				Stadium: Elm Park

16 October 1899 3	Tottenham Hotspur	1–2	Millwall	Tottenham, London
				Stadium: White Hart Lane

23 October 1899 4	Queens Park Rangers	1–3	Tottenham Hotspur	Kensal Green, London
				Stadium: Kensal Rise Athletic Ground

30 October 1899 5	Tottenham Hotspur	3–0	Reading	Tottenham, London
				Stadium: White Hart Lane

6 November 1899 6	Tottenham Hotspur	8–0	Chatham	Tottenham, London
				Stadium: White Hart Lane

15 November 1899 7	Bristol City	3–3	Tottenham Hotspur	Bristol, Gloucestershire
				Stadium: St John's Lane

20 November 1899 8	Tottenham Hotspur	3–1	Queens Park Rangers	Tottenham, London
				Stadium: White Hart Lane

4 December 1899 9	Chatham	0–1	Tottenham Hotspur	Chatham, Kent

8 January 1900 10	Tottenham Hotspur	3–2	Southampton	Tottenham, London
				Stadium: White Hart Lane

17 January 1900 11	Portsmouth	2–2	Tottenham Hotspur	Portsmouth, Hampshire
				Stadium: Fratton Park

12 March 1900 12	Tottenham Hotspur	2–0	Bristol City	Tottenham, London
				Stadium: White Hart Lane

17 April 1900 13	Tottenham Hotspur	4–2	Woolwich Arsenal	Tottenham, London
				Stadium: White Hart Lane

24 April 1900 14	Woolwich Arsenal	2–1 (Note: The Woolwich Arsenal game played on 24 April 1900 was abandoned after 55 minutes and never replayed.)	Tottenham Hotspur	Plumstead, London
				Stadium: Manor Ground

26 April 1900 15	Millwall	0–0	Tottenham Hotspur	Isle of Dogs, London
				Stadium: The Athletic Grounds

30 April 1900 16	Southampton	1–4	Tottenham Hotspur	Southampton, Hampshire
				Stadium: The Dell

=== FA Cup ===
==== Results ====
27 January 1900 First round	Preston North End	1–0	Tottenham Hotspur	Preston, Lancashire
				Stadium: Deepdale; Attendance: 7,000

== Bibliography ==
- Soar, Phil (1995). Tottenham Hotspur The Official Illustrated History 1882–1995. Hamlyn. ISBN 0-600-58706-1.
- Goodwin, Bob (1992). The Spurs Alphabet. ACL & Polar Publishing (UK) Ltd. ISBN 0-9514862-8-4.
