= 1901 FA Cup final =

British association football match

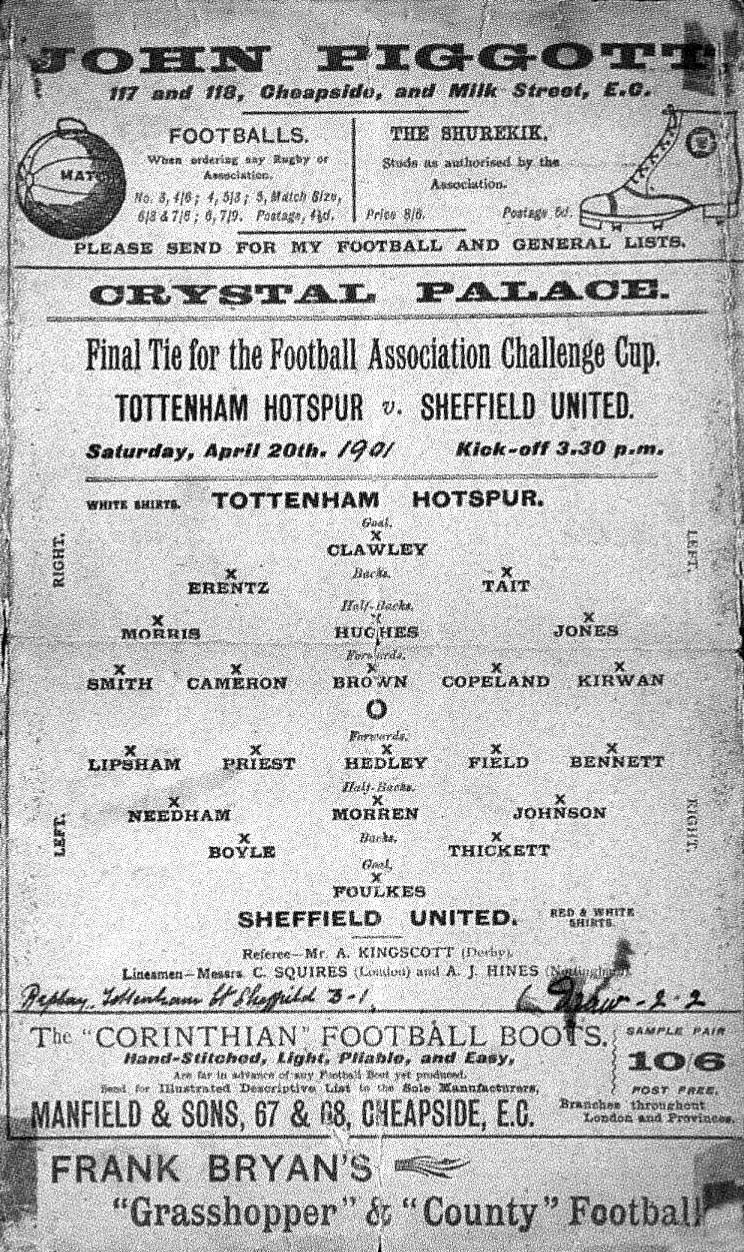
- Match programme
- Event: 1900–01 FA Cup
Sheffield United	Tottenham Hotspur
- Tottenham Hotspur won after a replay

Final
Sheffield United	Tottenham Hotspur
2	2
- Date: 20 April 1901
- Venue: Crystal Palace, London
- Referee: Arthur Kingscott (Long Eaton, Derbyshire)
- Attendance: 110,820
- Weather: Fine

Replay
Sheffield United	Tottenham Hotspur
1	3
- Date: 27 April 1901
- Venue: Burnden Park, Bolton
- Referee: Arthur Kingscott (Long Eaton, Derbyshire)
- Attendance: 20,470
- Weather: Windy with showers

The 1901 FA Cup final was an association football match between Sheffield United and Tottenham Hotspur on Saturday, 20 April 1901 at the Crystal Palace stadium in south London. It was the final match of the 1900–01 FA Cup, the 30th edition of the world's oldest football knockout competition, and England's primary cup competition, the Football Association Challenge Cup, better known as the FA Cup.

Sheffield United were appearing in their second final, having won the cup in 1899, and Tottenham Hotspur in their first. Both teams joined the competition in the first round proper and progressed through four rounds to the final. As a member of the Football League First Division, Sheffield United were exempt from the competition's qualifying phase. Tottenham Hotspur, as a member of the Southern League, would normally have been required to pre-qualify but, as champions of the Southern League in 1899–1900, they were given byes through the qualifying phase to the first round.

The final was watched by a world record crowd of 110,820 and ended in a 2–2 draw. The goalscorers were Fred Priest and Walter Bennett for Sheffield United and Sandy Brown (twice) for Tottenham Hotspur. A replay was held a week later on 27 April at Burnden Park in Bolton, but before a much-reduced crowd of 20,470. Tottenham Hotspur won 3–1 with goals by John Cameron, Tom Smith and Brown against one by Fred Priest for Sheffield United. Brown was the first player to score a goal (fifteen in total) in every round of an FA Cup tournament.

== Background ==
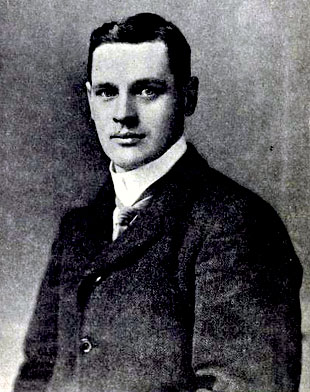
John Cameron, Tottenham's player-manager

Known officially as The Football Association Challenge Cup, the FA Cup is an annual knockout association football competition in men's domestic English football. The competition was first proposed on 20 July 1871 by C. W. Alcock at a meeting of The Football Association committee. The tournament was first played in the 1871–72 season and is the world's oldest association football competition. The 1901 match between Sheffield United and Tottenham Hotspur at Crystal Palace was the 30th final and the first of the 20th century. Sheffield United were appearing in the final for the second time, having defeated Derby County 4–1 in 1899. Tottenham Hotspur were making their first appearance in the match.

Sheffield United were members of the Football League First Division and, in the 1900–01 league championship, amassed 31 points to finish in 14th position, six points clear of the relegation placings. Tottenham Hotspur were the reigning Southern League champions, but they slipped to fifth place in the 1900–01 championship, five points behind new champions Southampton. Southern League teams normally had to qualify for the first round proper of the FA Cup but, as champions, Tottenham Hotspur were exempted from pre-qualification and were given byes to the first round.

Sheffield United's team between 1889 and 1932 was selected by a committee but with the club secretary in charge of the team on match days. In 1901, this was John Nicholson. Tottenham Hotspur were managed by John Cameron, their inside forward, who became the first player-manager to lead his team to a cup final victory. Cameron did not lead the team on the field, however; Jack Jones was the team captain.

== Route to the final ==
=== Sheffield United ===
Round	Opposition	Score
First	Sunderland (a)	2–1
Second	Everton (h)	2–0
Third	Wolverhampton Wanderers (a)	4–0
Semi-final	Aston Villa (n)	2–2
Semi-final (replay)	Aston Villa (n)	3–0
Key: (h) = home venue; (a) = away venue; (n) = neutral venue. Source:

Sheffield United entered the competition in the first round proper and played five matches, including one replay, en route to the final. All four of their opponents were other teams in the First Division.

==== Early rounds ====
In the first round, Sheffield were drawn away to Sunderland at Roker Park. This was a difficult hurdle as Sunderland were one of the leading teams in the First Division, eventually finishing as runners-up behind champions Liverpool. The match was played on Saturday, 9 February and Sheffield United won 2–1 with goals by Bert Lipsham and Fred Priest. Sunderland's goal was scored by Colin McLatchie.

Sheffield then faced Everton in a home tie at Bramall Lane on Saturday, 23 February and won 2–0. Both goals were scored by Walter Bennett.

In the third (quarter-final) round, Sheffield United were drawn away to Wolverhampton Wanderers at Molineux on Saturday, 23 March. This was expected to be a tough match but United won 4–0 and The Times said their performance was "remarkable". Priest scored an early goal and then, ten minutes before half-time, Sheffield scored their other three goals in as many minutes. The report says George Hedley, who scored the second goal, was "quite brilliant". Bennett scored the third; the fourth was an own goal by George Barker.

==== Semi-final ====
The semi-finals were staged at neutral venues on Saturday, 6 April, and Monday, 8 April. Sheffield United's opponents were Aston Villa who, like themselves, were struggling in the First Division and eventually avoided relegation by five points. The match was played on the Saturday at the City Ground in Nottingham. As in the first round, Sheffield's goalscorers were Priest and Lipsham. The Villa goals were scored by Billy Garraty and Jack Devey.

Sheffield's right back Harry Thickett withdrew from the match as his wife had just died, The Times reporting this made a considerable difference to Sheffield, who were expected to win the tie. As it was, they took the lead after five minutes when good passing by Hedley and Lipsham put Priest through on goal. Garraty equalised several minutes later but, just before half time, a well-taken free kick by Ernest Needham created a chance for Lipsham, who hit a fast and low shot into the net. In the second half, Devey equalised after five minutes with a headed goal. The Sheffield defence, without Thickett, was disorganised and Devey was given a clear chance to score. Villa were the better team after this but no more goals were scored and the match ended in a 2–2 draw after 90 minutes with no extra time allowed.

A replay was necessary and was played at the Baseball Ground in Derby five days later on Thursday, 11 April. Sheffield won 3–0 with two goals by Priest and one by Bennett. The Times reported that the teams were evenly matched for much of the first half until an error by one of the Villa players allowed Bennett to race clear and score the first goal with a hard shot which went in off a post. Villa tried hard for an equaliser but their forwards were not combining well and, when they did shoot at goal, they created little difficulty for Willie Foulke, the Sheffield goalkeeper. With about fifteen minutes remaining, good passing between Hedley and Bennett put Priest through on goal and he made it 2–0. A few minutes later, Priest scored the third goal after receiving a pass from Hedley. An estimated 25,000 people watched the match.

=== Tottenham Hotspur ===
Round	Opposition	Score
First	Preston North End (h)	1–1
First (replay)	Preston North End (a)	4–2
Second	Bury (h)	2–1
Third	Reading (a)	1–1
Third (replay)	Reading (h)	3–0
Semi-final	West Bromwich Albion (n)	4–0
Key: (h) = home venue; (a) = away venue; (n) = neutral venue. Source:

Tottenham Hotspur entered the competition in the first round proper and played six matches, including two replays, en route to the final. Three of their opponents were in the First Division and one was in the Southern League.

==== Early rounds ====
In the first round, Tottenham were drawn at home to First Division Preston North End who had defeated them 1–0 at Deepdale in the first round of the previous season's competition. This season, however, Preston were struggling in the league and were relegated at the end of the season. The match was played on Saturday, 9 February and was the first-ever FA Cup tie at White Hart Lane, which Tottenham had acquired in 1899. It ended in a 1–1 draw, so a replay was needed. Tottenham's goal was scored by Sandy Brown. Preston's goalscorer was Johnny McMahon.

The replay took place at Deepdale on Wednesday, 13 February, Tottenham avenging their defeat there last season with a 4–2 win, largely due to a hat-trick by Brown. The other goal was scored by player-manager John Cameron. Preston's goals were scored by Frank Becton and former Tottenham forward Tom Pratt.

Tottenham were drawn at home in the second round to the FA Cup holders Bury, who had outplayed Tottenham's Southern League rivals Southampton in the 1900 final, winning 4–0. Bury were doing well in the First Division and eventually finished fifth. The match was played on Saturday, 23 February, and Tottenham won 2–1 with two more goals by Brown. Bury's goal was scored by Jasper McLuckie. The Times report says that Tottenham played well and merited their victory, especially as they had to recover from being a goal down, but "they were lucky in finding the Bury eleven quite out of form".

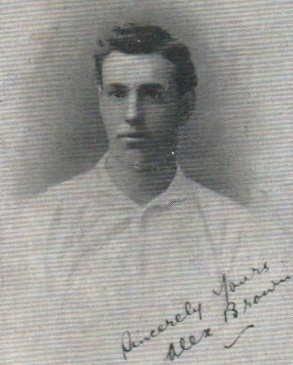
Tottenham's Sandy Brown scored a goal in every round

In the third round, Tottenham faced Reading, who were also in the Southern League, at Elm Park. The match on Saturday, 23 March, ended 1–1. Tottenham's goal was scored by left winger Jack Kirwan. Reading's goalscorer was Dick Evans. In the replay at White Hart Lane on Thursday, 28 March, Tottenham won the game 3–0 with two goals by Brown and one by David Copeland. The crowd was 12,000. This victory took Tottenham into their first FA Cup semi-final.

==== Semi-final ====
Tottenham Hotspur's semi-final was played on Monday, 8 April against First Division West Bromwich Albion at Villa Park. Albion were having a poor season in the league and, along with Tottenham's first round opponents Preston, they were relegated at the end of the season. Tottenham had a convincing win by 4–0 with all four goals scored by Brown.

The Times report commented upon the decisiveness of the Tottenham victory before a crowd of about 50,000. Pitch conditions were good but there was a strong wind with variable gusts. Both sides mounted attacks in the first half but the match was goalless at half-time. Three minutes into the second half, Kirwan ran clear on the left wing and centred the ball for Brown to head in the first goal. Having taken the lead, the Tottenham players became more relaxed and began to play an accurate, short passing game which resulted in two more goals in the next fifteen minutes. Both were scored by Brown after clever manoeuvres by his colleagues. Albion tried to assert themselves and created chances of their own but they could not beat Tottenham goalkeeper George Clawley, who had an outstanding game. Eight minutes from the end, a Tottenham breakaway resulted in a fourth goal by Brown. Although Brown scored all four goals, The Times report declared that Kirwan was "the finest forward on the field". At the time, it was Albion's biggest defeat in the FA Cup.

== Match ==
=== Pre-match ===
The final was played at the Crystal Palace stadium on Saturday, 20 April. The weather was fine. In a brief report published the morning of the match, The Times predicted "one of the hardest matches ever played in the competition" and reported that the condition of the Crystal Palace pitch had been satisfactory the previous day with a "true springy turf". It is the earliest FA Cup final from which any newsreel footage survives. There was massive local interest in the match, given the presence of a London team in the final. Even so, as Mike Collett says, while Tottenham were a southern club, they were hardly a southern team – five Scots, two Welshmen, one Irishman and, although three players were English, "none of them came from south of the Trent".

=== Final ===
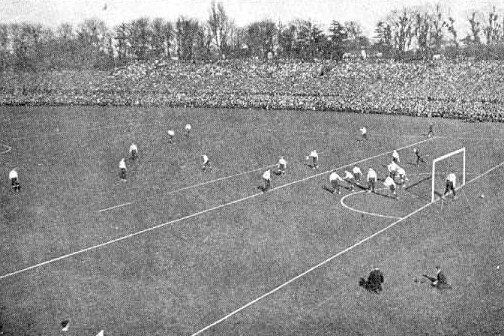
Tottenham's equalising goal after 23 minutes

A world record crowd of 110,820 watched the match. Sandy Brown became the first player to score in every round of an FA Cup tournament. He scored both Tottenham goals in the final as well as one in the replay for a total of 15 in the whole competition. Fred Priest opened the scoring after ten minutes and Brown equalised after 23 minutes. The score at half-time was 1–1 and, five minutes after the restart, Brown scored his second to give Tottenham a 2–1 lead.

Less than a minute later, Sheffield equalised with a goal that Mike Collett has described as "one of the most controversial ever scored in a final". It is unclear what exactly happened but, according to Collett, the most likely scenario is that Tottenham's goalkeeper George Clawley tried to catch a shot by Bert Lipsham and fumbled it. The ball dropped behind Clawley and he spun round to try and kick it away under pressure from Walter Bennett. The ball went out of play over the dead ball line and the linesman signalled a corner, as he thought Clawley had been the last player to make contact with the ball. The referee, however, overruled him and signalled a goal kick, as he thought Bennett had the last contact. Before Clawley could take the goal kick, the referee changed his mind and awarded a goal to Sheffield with Bennett named as the scorer.

The match ended in a 2–2 draw and, as extra time was not allowed, a replay was necessary. In its match report on Monday morning, The Times described the Sheffield equaliser as "the chief incident of the match". The report says that the referee was "certain in his judgment" that the ball was over the line but counters that with a comment by Clawley that "it was impossible for him to have been behind his own line".

=== Replay ===
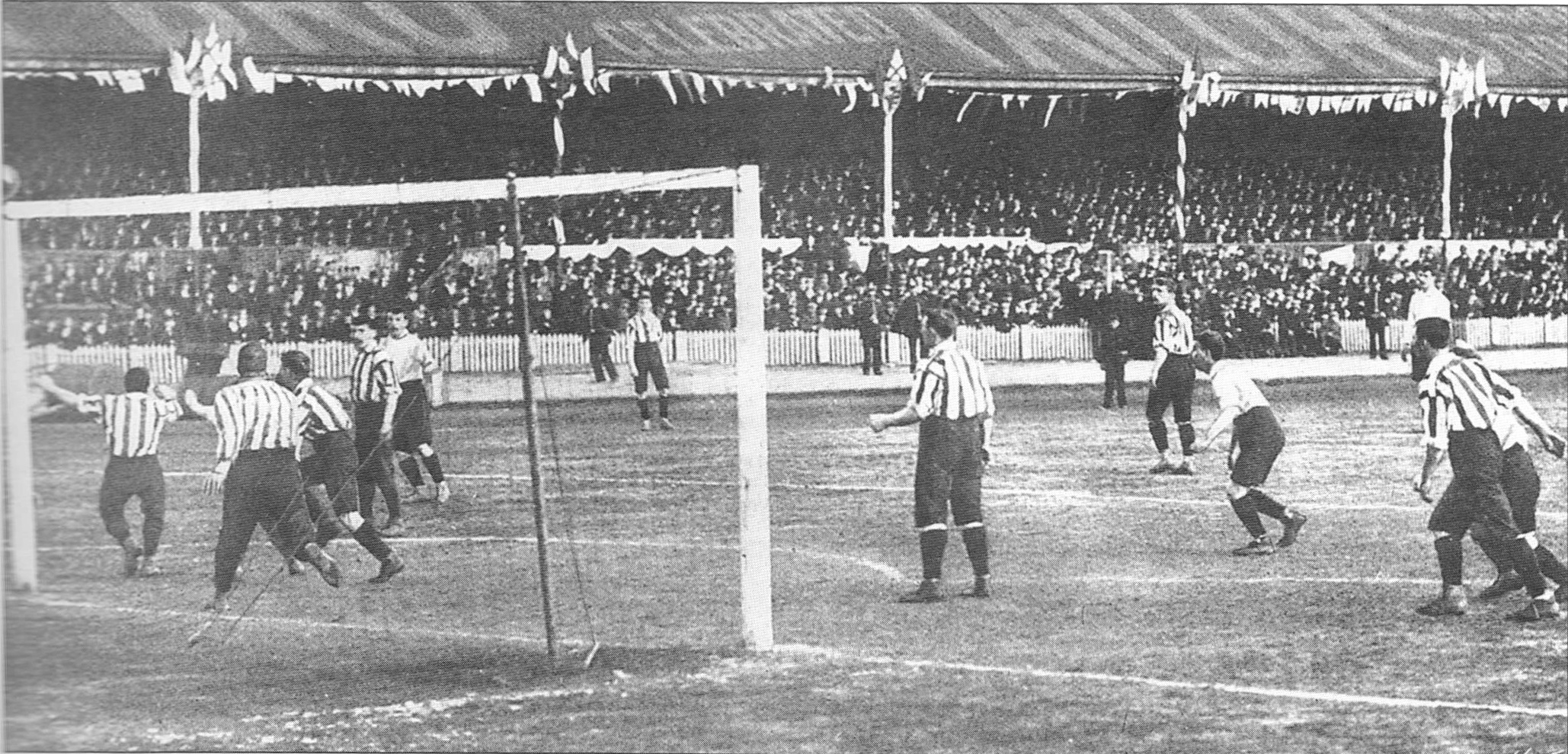
Tottenham's third goal in the replay. Scorer Sandy Brown is hidden.

The replay took place a week later under windy conditions with showers at Burnden Park—home of Bolton Wanderers—with both teams unchanged. The crowd of 20,740 was the lowest at any FA Cup final in the 20th century. As in the first match, Fred Priest opened the scoring and this time Sheffield led 1–0 at half-time, but Tottenham dominated the second half and won 3–1 with goals by Cameron, Tom Smith and Brown.

The Times began its report with an essay on the virtues of amateurism versus the "new methods" of professionalism. It regretted the decline and fall of amateurism but declared that "it is an epoch in the history of the game to have the cup once more in the south". Turning at length to the match, the report says that it "did honour to both teams" and was the best football in a final for a long time. The report praised "the genius" of Sheffield captain Needham, but Tottenham adopted different tactics in the second half and relied on pace and combination to attack the Sheffield goal. The teams remained level until fifteen minutes from the end when Cameron had another chance to score. His shot was partially blocked by Peter Boyle but Smith, following up, scored from the rebound. A few minutes later, Brown scored with a header from a corner to complete the scoring.

== Details ==
=== Final ===
20 April 1901
15:00 GMT

Sheffield United	2–2	Tottenham Hotspur
Priest 10'; Bennett 52'		Brown 23', 51'

Crystal Palace, London
Attendance: 110,820
Referee: Arthur Kingscott, Long Eaton
Linesmen: C. Squires & A. G. Hines

Sheffield United	Tottenham Hotspur

GK	(England) Willie Foulke
RB	(England) Harry Thickett
LB	(Ireland) Peter Boyle
RH	(England) Harry Johnson
CH	(England) Tommy Morren
LH	(England) Ernest Needham (c)
RW	(England) Walter Bennett
IR	(England) Oakey Field
CF	(England) George Hedley
IL	(England) Fred Priest
LW	(England) Bert Lipsham
Club secretary:
(England) John Nicholson

GK	(England) George Clawley
RB	(Scotland) Harry Erentz
LB	(Scotland) Sandy Tait
RH	(England) Tom Morris
CH	(Wales) Ted Hughes
LH	(Wales) Jack Jones (c)
RW	(England) Tom Smith
IR	(Scotland) John Cameron
CF	(Scotland) Sandy Brown
IL	(Scotland) David Copeland
LW	(Ireland) Jack Kirwan
Player-manager:
(Scotland) John Cameron

Match rules

- 90 minutes duration (two halves of 45 minutes each; teams change ends at half-time). (Note: The duration of a football match has been 90 minutes since an agreement in 1866 for the match between London and Sheffield.)
- No extra time if scores level at end of normal time. (Note: The FA introduced the option of extra time into its rules in 1897.) Result to be settled by replay at a later date. (Note: The 1875 final was the first in which a replay took place; this method of deciding the winners continued until 1999. The 2005 final was the first to be settled by penalty shoot-out.)
- No substitutes allowed. (Note: Although there were isolated instances of substitution in earlier times, it was not until the beginning of the 1965–66 season that substitutes were first allowed in English top-class matches, and then only for replacement of injured players.)

Notes

- Players are listed above according to their positions on the field. There was no shirt numbering in 1901. (Note: The first known instance of shirt numbering in English football was in March 1914. It was not until the 1939–40 season that a numbering system was formally introduced.)

=== Replay ===
27 April 1901
15:00 GMT

Sheffield United	1–3	Tottenham Hotspur
Priest 40'		Cameron 52'; Smith 76'; Brown 87'

Burnden Park, Bolton
Attendance: 20,470
Referee: Arthur Kingscott, Long Eaton
Linesmen: C. Squires & A. G. Hines

Sheffield United	Tottenham Hotspur

GK	(England) Willie Foulke
RB	(England) Harry Thickett
LB	(Ireland) Peter Boyle
RH	(England) Harry Johnson
CH	(England) Tommy Morren
LH	(England) Ernest Needham (c)
RW	(England) Walter Bennett
IR	(England) Oakey Field
CF	(England) George Hedley
IL	(England) Fred Priest
LW	(England) Bert Lipsham
Club secretary:
(England) John Nicholson

GK	(England) George Clawley
RB	(Scotland) Harry Erentz
LB	(Scotland) Sandy Tait
RH	(England) Tom Morris
CH	(Wales) Ted Hughes
LH	(Wales) Jack Jones (c)
RW	(England) Tom Smith
IR	(Scotland) John Cameron
CF	(Scotland) Sandy Brown
IL	(Scotland) David Copeland
LW	(Ireland) Jack Kirwan
Player-manager:
(Scotland) John Cameron

Match rules

- 90 minutes duration (two halves of 45 minutes each; teams change ends at half-time).
- 30 minutes of extra time if scores level at end of normal time.
- Replay at a later date if scores still level at end of extra time.
- No substitutes allowed.

Notes

- Players are listed above according to their positions on the field. There was no shirt numbering in 1901.

== Post-match ==
General Sir Redvers Buller, accompanied by his wife Lady Audrey, was the guest of honour at the first match and it was intended that he would present the cup and medals. As the match was drawn, he made a short speech instead and complimented both teams. He amused the crowd by drawing a parallel between football and the Army in that, as he put it, the side which usually wins is the one which is best practised at shooting.

Buller could not attend the replay, after which the trophy was presented to Tottenham captain Jack Jones by FA president Lord Kinnaird who was himself a famous footballer, having played in a record nine FA Cup finals from 1873 to 1883. Tottenham are the only team from outside the Football League to win the FA Cup since the foundation of the league in 1888. They were the second Southern League team in succession to reach the final, following Southampton in 1900. Southern League teams began joining the Football League in the 1900s – Tottenham's own application was accepted in 1908.

The tradition of tying ribbons on the trophy started after Tottenham won the match, when the wife of a Tottenham director decided to tie blue and white ribbons to the handles of the cup. It became the practise at subsequent finals for the trophy to be decorated with ribbons in the colours of both finalists, with the loser's ribbons being removed at the end of the game.

Tottenham Hotspur have gone on to play in nine finals, winning eight and losing only one. Their most recent win was in 1991 when they defeated Nottingham Forest and became the first club to win the FA Cup eight times, though that record has since been surpassed by Arsenal and Manchester United.

Sheffield United have made four further FA Cup final appearances. They reached the final again in 1902 and defeated Southampton. They won in both 1915 against Chelsea and 1925 against Cardiff City, but lost to Arsenal in 1936.

== Bibliography ==
- Collett, Mike (2003). The Complete Record of the FA Cup. Cheltenham: SportsBooks Ltd. ISBN 978-18-99807-19-2.
