= Fred Griffiths =

Fred or Frederick Griffiths may refer to:

- Fred Griffiths (rugby league) (died 2000), rugby league footballer and coach
- Fred Griffiths (footballer) (1876–1917), Welsh association football player
- Fred Griffiths (actor) (1912–1994), English film and television actor
- Frederick Augustus Griffiths (died 1869), British Army officer and military writer
