= Arthur Kingscott =

English football referee

- Born: 21 January 1864; Long Eaton, Derbyshire, England
- Died: 19 June 1937 (aged 73)
- Occupation: Football referee
- Known for: Involvement in the 1901 FA Cup Final controversy

Arthur Kingscott (21 January 1864 – 19 June 1937) was a footballing personality from Derbyshire at the turn of the 20th century. He was from New Sawley, Long Eaton, Derbyshire, England, later serving as a treasurer at the Football Association. There is an unconfirmed report in Caxton's Association Football (1960) that Kingscott played a hand in the discovery of Steve Bloomer before his first game with Derby County.

== 1900 and 1901 FA Cup Finals ==
Kingscott has been the seventh man, and the last until Anthony Taylor in 2020, to referee the FA Cup Final in two different years when he took charge of both the 1900 and 1901 matches (indeed the second of those matches featured a replay; Kingscott was the referee there as well). Both matches were notable for featuring Southern League sides, a feat which had arisen due to the fallout created by The Association Footballers' Union attempt to unionise football in 1898.

In the first of those matches Bury defeated Southampton and in the second Tottenham were victorious against Sheffield United.

== Controversy at the 1901 FA Cup Final ==
In the 1901 final Kingscott awarded an equalising goal for Sheffield United that became a matter of great debate indeed was the first goalmouth incident to be debated with the use of film. The award of the goal was controversial but did not provoke any complaint. The following has been recorded of that incident:

"A linesman flagged for a corner-kick after Bennett had charged Tottenham goalkeeper Clawley near the goal-line and the ball had gone behind. The referee then surprised everyone by awarding a goal to Sheffield, on the grounds that the ball had crossed the goal-line as Clawley had attempted to field Lipsham's shot from the left seconds before Bennett had moved in to charge him. The general opinion was that referee Kingscott had made a sad error of judgement. He was too far up the field to be able to decide the point, yet he refused to consult with a linesman much nearer to the incident."

Kingscott, however, was appointed to referee the replayed final at Burnden Park in Bolton, Lancashire, the following Saturday.

== Lengthy career ==
Kingscott refereed on the English Football League from 1891 until 1906, 14 seasons in total and his son, Arthur H Kingscott, refereed for 13 seasons in the 1920s and 1930s, taking charge of the 1931 FA Cup Final.

== Resignation from role as FA treasurer ==
Kingscott was in attendance in his duty at FA treasurer at the opening of York City's Bootham Crescent in August 1932. However, it was on 12 December 1933 that he resigned his position following comments that he directed at the referee of the 1933 FA Cup Final. Kingscott alleged that the Final referees had earned money from the use of the match ball.
