= 1898–99 FA Cup =

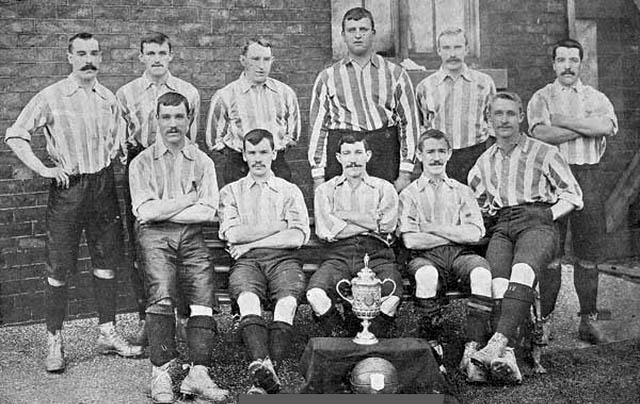
- Sheffield United team members with the FA Cup

Tournament details
- Country: England; Wales

Final positions
- Champions: Sheffield United (1st title)
- Runners-up: Derby County

The 1898–99 FA Cup was the 28th season of the world's oldest association football competition, the Football Association Challenge Cup (more usually known as the FA Cup). The cup was won by Sheffield United, who defeated Derby County 4–1 in the final of the competition, played at Crystal Palace in London.

Matches were scheduled to be played at the stadium of the team named first on the date specified for each round, which was always a Saturday. If scores were level after 90 minutes had been played, a replay would take place at the stadium of the second-named team later the same week. If the replayed match was drawn further replays would be held at neutral venues until a winner was determined. If scores were level after 90 minutes had been played in a replay, a 30-minute period of extra time would be played.

== Calendar ==
The format of the FA Cup for the season had a preliminary round, five qualifying rounds, three proper rounds, and the semi-finals and final.

Round	Date
Preliminary round	Saturday 24 September 1898
First round qualifying	Saturday 1 October 1898
Second round qualifying	Saturday 15 October 1898
Third round qualifying	Saturday 29 October 1898
Fourth round qualifying	Saturday 19 November 1898
Fifth round qualifying	Saturday 10 December 1899
First round proper	Saturday 28 January 1899
Second round proper	Saturday 11 February 1899
Third round proper	Saturday 25 February 1899
Semi-finals	Saturday 18 March 1899
Final	Saturday 15 April 1899

== Qualifying rounds ==
This season saw the further expansion of the Football League First and Second Divisions to 18 teams each. The 18 First Division sides received byes to the first round, along with Newton Heath, Woolwich Arsenal and Manchester City from the Second Division. In recognition of the increasing strength of the Southern League, the previous season's champions of that competition Southampton were awarded the final automatic entry to the competition proper.

Most of the other Football League clubs were entered into the third qualifying round, with the exceptions of Barnsley, who started in the second qualifying round, and Burton Swifts, Blackpool and Loughborough who were placed in the first qualifying round. Of those sides, only Grimsby Town, Small Heath and Glossop North End progressed to the FA Cup proper along with non-league sides Jarrow, South Shore, Heanor Town, Kettering, Bristol City, New Brompton and Tottenham Hotspur. Jarrow, Bristol City and New Brompton were featuring in the first round for the first time, but, in a further reflection of the growing stature of the Southern League, Southampton and Tottenham Hotspur were the only non-league clubs to progress beyond this stage.

== First round proper ==
Once again, the FA Cup's first round proper contained sixteen ties between 32 teams. The matches were played on Saturday, 28 January 1899. Four matches were drawn, with the replays taking place in the following midweek fixture.

Tie no	Home team	Score	Away team	Date
1	Bristol City	2–4	Sunderland	28 January 1899
2	Burnley	2–2	Sheffield United	28 January 1899
Replay	Sheffield United	2–1	Burnley	2 February 1899
3	Liverpool	2–0	Blackburn Rovers	28 January 1899
4	Preston North End	7–0	Grimsby Town	28 January 1899
5	Notts County	2–0	Kettering	28 January 1899
6	Nottingham Forest	2–1	Aston Villa	28 January 1899
7	The Wednesday	2–2	Stoke	28 January 1899
Replay	Stoke	2–0	The Wednesday	2 February 1899
8	Wolverhampton Wanderers	0–0	Bolton Wanderers	28 January 1899
Replay	Bolton Wanderers	0–1	Wolverhampton Wanderers	1 February 1899
9	West Bromwich Albion	8–0	South Shore	28 January 1899
10	Everton	3–1	Jarrow	28 January 1899
11	Small Heath	3–2	Manchester City	28 January 1899
12	Heanor Town	0–3	Bury	28 January 1899
13	Woolwich Arsenal	0–6	Derby County	28 January 1899
14	New Brompton	0–1	Southampton	28 January 1899
15	Tottenham Hotspur	1–1	Newton Heath	28 January 1899
Replay	Newton Heath	3–5	Tottenham Hotspur	1 February 1899
16	Glossop	0–1	Newcastle United	28 January 1899

== Second round proper ==
The eight Second Round matches were scheduled for Saturday, 11 February 1899, although only three games were played on this date. The other five games were played the following Saturday. There were three replays, played in the following midweek fixture.

Tie no	Home team	Score	Away team	Date
1	Liverpool	3–1	Newcastle United	11 February 1899
2	Preston North End	2–2	Sheffield United	11 February 1899
Replay	Sheffield United	2–1	Preston North End	16 February 1899
3	Stoke	2–2	Small Heath	11 February 1899
Replay	Small Heath	1–2	Stoke	15 February 1899
4	Notts County	0–1	Southampton	11 February 1899
5	West Bromwich Albion	2–1	Bury	11 February 1899
6	Derby County	2–1	Wolverhampton Wanderers	11 February 1899
7	Everton	0–1	Nottingham Forest	11 February 1899
8	Tottenham Hotspur	2–1	Sunderland	11 February 1899

== Third round proper ==
The four Third Round matches were scheduled for Saturday, 25 February 1899. There were no replays.

Tie no	Home team	Score	Away team	Date
1	Southampton	1–2	Derby County	25 February 1899
2	Stoke	4–1	Tottenham Hotspur	25 February 1899
3	Nottingham Forest	0–1	Sheffield United	25 February 1899
4	West Bromwich Albion	0–2	Liverpool	25 February 1899

== Semi-finals ==
The semi-final matches were both played on Saturday, 18 March 1899. The Sheffield United–Liverpool match went to a replay, played the following Thursday. The match was again replayed a week later, when Sheffield managed a 1–0 win. They went on to meet Derby County in the final at Crystal Palace.

18 March 1899

Derby County	3–1	Stoke

Molineux, Wolverhampton

18 March 1899

Sheffield United	2–2	Liverpool

City Ground, Nottingham

Replay

23 March 1899

Sheffield United	4–4	Liverpool

Burnden Park, Bolton

Second Replay

30 March 1899

Sheffield United	1–0	Liverpool

Baseball Ground, Derby

== Final ==
The final took place on Saturday, 15 April 1899 at Crystal Palace. Just under 74,000 supporters attended the match, a record attendance at the time. John Boag opened the scoring for Derby County after 12 minutes. Derby's lead was maintained until midway through the second half, until Sheffield struck back with three goals in ten minutes from Walter Bennett, Billy Beer and John Almond. Fred Priest scored the fourth and final goal in the eighty-ninth minute, to cap a good victory for the Yorkshire side.

=== Match details ===
15 April 1899
15:00 GMT

Sheffield United	4–1	Derby County
Bennett 60'; Beer 65'; Almond 69'; Priest 89'		Boag 12'

Crystal Palace, London
Attendance: 73,833
Referee: A. Scragg

Sheffield United	Derby County

== See also ==
- FA Cup Final Results 1872–
