= James Melia =

James or Jimmy Melia may refer to:

- James Melia (footballer, born 1874), Sheffield Wednesday, Tottenham Hotspur, Preston North End
- Jimmy Melia (born 1937), Liverpool, Wolverhampton Wanderers, Southampton, Aldershot
