= Sandy Tait =

Scottish footballer (1871–1949)

Personal information
- Full name: Alexander Gilchrist Tait
- Date of birth: 3 December 1871
- Place of birth: Glenbuck, Scotland
- Date of death: 6 April 1949 (aged 77)
- Place of death: Croydon, England
- Position: Full back

Senior career*
| Years | Team | Apps | (Gls) |
- Glenburn Athletic
- Ayr
- Royal Albert
| 1891 | → Rangers (loan) | 6 | (0) |
| 1892–1894 | Motherwell | 17 | (0) |
| 1894–1899 | Preston North End | 76 | (0) |
| 1899–1908 | Tottenham Hotspur | 207 | (3) |
| 1908–1909 | Leyton | 6 | (0) |
| 1910–1911 | Croydon Common | 0 | (0) |

Managerial career
- 1905: IFK Norrköping (coach)
- 1908–1910: Leyton (player-manager)
- 1910–1911: Croydon Common (player-manager)
- Corinthian
- * Club domestic league appearances and goals

Alexander Gilchrist Tait (3 December 1871 – 6 April 1949) was a Scottish professional footballer who played full back for teams including Glenburn Athletic, Ayr, Royal Albert F.C., Rangers, Motherwell, Preston North End, Tottenham Hotspur, Leyton and Croydon Common. He is also distantly related to British cricketer Andrew Flintoff.

== Football career ==
Sandy Tait was one of 13 children and worked as a pitboy leading the pit ponies while beginning his career at local club Glenbuck Athletic. He had a brief spell with Ayr and spent three years with Royal Albert but no league appearances are recorded for either of these initial clubs. Tait had a loan spell with Rangers in 1891–92 making his debut at left back in the Scottish League on 12 September 1891 in a 6–1 win at Vale of Leven. Tait made 6 appearances in season 1891–92 before being replaced at left back by Dunbar. Tait joined Motherwell for the following two seasons, making 17 appearances in 1893–94.

=== Preston North End ===
In 1894 Tait left Motherwell and joined Preston North End making his First Division debut at right back in a 3–1 win v Nottingham Forest on 23 March 1895 and made 3 appearances as Preston finished in 4th place in 1894–95. In the following season Tait was a regular first at right back with England international Bob Holmes at left back then switching over to left back with Holmes at right back. Tait made 26 appearances as Preston finished 9th in 1895–96. On 23 November 1895 Preston visited Small Heath at their Coventry Road ground on a blustery afternoon with a bitterly cold wind. Tait was playing at right back with a half time score of 2–1 to Small Heath when the Preston goalkeeper John Wright, playing only his second game, was found to have a fractured wrist from an accidental first half collision. Tait went into goal and Preston played on with 10 men equalising but then conceding three late goals to lose 2–5. When Preston finished 4th in the table in 1896–97 Tait began at left back but lost his place to Hugh Dunn and made only 16 appearances. In 1897–98 Tait played at right back in the first match and the last four but made only 8 appearances in the season as Preston slipped to 12th place of 16 teams in the First Division. Tait shared the full back duties with Holmes and Dunn again in 1898–99 making 26 appearances mainly at left back.

=== Tottenham Hotspur and Croydon ===
After playing 76 matches Tait moved on to Tottenham Hotspur in the Southern League. While with Preston Tait was known as "Terrible Tait" a reference to his ferocious tackling and took his football very seriously but always played the game to the rules and was never booked. The full back joined the Spurs making his debut at left back at Millwall Athletic in a 3–1 win on 2 September 1899 and made 32 appearances in 1899–1900 when Tottenham were Southern League champions. Tait played at left back in all 8 FA Cup ties and was a member of the Lilywhites 1901 FA Cup Final winning side v Sheffield United after a replay. In 1900–01 Tait made 22 appearances in the Southern League as Tottenham finished 5th. Tait was also a regular for the Tottenham side playing in the Western League. Tottenham rose to runners up in the Southern League in 1901–02 when Tait made 26 appearances. Tait made 25 appearances scoring one goal, a penalty in a 3–1 win v New Brompton, during 1902–03 when Tottenham finished 4th in the Southern League. Tait continued to play in the Western league side that ran alongside the Southern League matches. Tottenham were runners up in the Southern League in 1903–04 when Tait made a further 25 appearances. In season 1904–05 Tait made another 25 appearances at left back scoring one goal a penalty in a 2–0 win v Watford. In season 1905–06 Tait made 27 appearances scoring one goal as Tottenham finished in 5th place. Tait was the regular left back again in 1906–07 making 24 appearances as Tottenham reached 6th place in the Southern League table. In 1907–08 Burton took over as the left back restricting Tait to a single appearance in the Southern League side. Tait was captain of Tottenham during the latter part of his career at White Hart Lane. He had excellent positional sense and a football brain. He was not especially fast but his tackling ability carried him through. He gave Spurs eight seasons of sterling service playing a total of 349 first team games, which comprised 207 in the Southern League, 78 in the Western League, 15 in the London League, 14 in the Southern and District Combination League and 35 in the FA Cup, with five goals in all competitions. He later moved on to Leyton first as a player then manager before finishing his career as manager of Croydon Common for whom he also made a few South Eastern League and London League appearances.

== Honours ==
Tottenham Hotspur

- Southern League First Division: 1899–1900
- FA Cup: 1900–01
