= Fred Priest =

English footballer and manager (1875–1922)

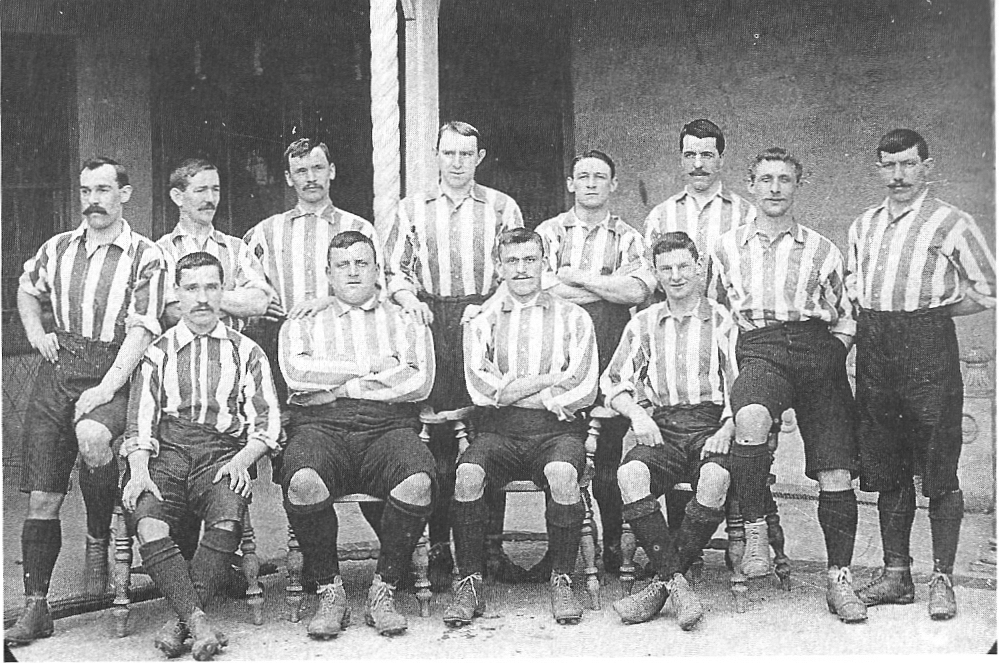
- The 1901 FA Cup final team; Priest is standing second from the right.

Personal information
- Full name: Alfred Ernest Priest
- Date of birth: 24 July 1875
- Place of birth: South Bank, England
- Date of death: 5 May 1922 (aged 46)
- Place of death: Hartlepool, England
- Positions: Outside left; inside left

Youth career
- Darlington
- South Bank

Senior career*
Years	Team	Apps	(Gls)
1896–1905	Sheffield United	209	(72)
1905–1906	South Bank		
1906–1908	Middlesbrough	13	(0)
1908–1909	Hartlepools United		

International career
1900	England	1	(0)

Managerial career
- 1908–1912: Hartlepools United
- * Club domestic league appearances and goals

Alfred Ernest Priest (24 July 1875 – 5 May 1922) was a professional footballer from the North East of England who won the 1899 and 1902 FA Cup finals with Sheffield United.

== Playing career ==
Priest was born in South Bank and played for Darlington and South Bank before joining Sheffield United in 1896. He made his debut in the Football League First Division in the 1896–97 season, playing mainly as outside left and later as an inside forward. He helped United win the Football League championship in 1897–98. That same year Priest was also in the United side that suffered a huge FA Cup upset at Port Vale. He won a cap for the England national team for a match against Ireland in 1900. In the 1901–02 season, Priest finished as the joint top scorer in the Football League. Priest departed the Blades in 1906 having made more than 200 appearances, scoring on 71 occasions. He had a short spell with South Bank before joining Middlesbrough. At Middlesbrough, Priest worked as an assistant trainer alongside his playing duties.

== Managerial career ==
Priest became the first ever manager of the newly formed Hartlepools United in August 1908 as a player-manager. Priest played at right back for Pools early in his career. He managed the club for the first four years of its history. Under Priest, Hartlepools finished in the top four of the North Eastern League three times as well as winning the Durham Senior Cup.

== Post-football ==
After his career in football ended, he remained in Hartlepool as a licensee of the Market Hotel on the Headland. He died on 5 May 1922 after a short illness at the age of 46. In October 1922, his former clubs Hartlepools United and Sheffield United played a benefit match in order to generate funds for his widow.

== Honours ==
=== As a player ===
Sheffield United

- Football League First Division: 1897–98
- FA Cup: 1898–99, 1901–02; runner-up: 1900–01
