= George Barker (footballer, born 1875) =

English footballer

Personal information
- Full name: George Barker
- Date of birth: 12 February 1875
- Place of birth: Blakenhall, England
- Position: Full back

Senior career*
Years	Team	Apps	(Gls)
1896–1898	Everton	10	(0)
1898–1899	Bristol City	?	(?)
1899–1900	Bedminster	?	(?)
1900–1901	Wolverhampton Wanderers	13	(0)
Total		23	(0)
- * Club domestic league appearances and goals

George Barker (12 February 1875–unknown) was an English footballer who played in the Football League for Everton and Wolverhampton Wanderers.
