= Joe Moffatt =

Scottish footballer

Personal information
- Full name: Joseph Moffatt
- Date of birth: 1875
- Place of birth: Paisley, Scotland
- Date of death: 1950 (aged 74–75)
- Position: Centre forward

Senior career*
Years	Team	Apps	(Gls)
1895–1896	Bo'ness		
1896	Abercorn		
1896	Bo'ness		
1896	Wishaw Thistle		
1897	Bo'ness		
1897	St Mirren		
1898	Chatham		
1898	Gravesend United		
1899–1900	Walsall	27	(13)
1900–1901	Tottenham Hotspur	5	(3)
1901	Bo'ness		
1901–1903	St Mirren		
1903–1905	Manchester City	20	(5)
1905–1907	Kilmarnock		
1907	Nelson		
1908	Heart of Midlothian		
1908	Watford		
1909	Aberdeen		
Total		52	(21)
- * Club domestic league appearances and goals

Joseph Moffatt (1875–unknown) was a Scottish footballer who played in the Football League for Manchester City and Walsall. On 17 February 1900 he scored a hat-trick in Walsall's 7-3 win against Luton Town.

Moffatt was at Tottenham Hotspur for only one season which was the 1900–01 season. In Phil Soar's Tottenham Hotspur The Official Illustrated History 1882-1995, Moffatt is recorded having played five Southern League games and scoring three goals.
