= Tom Pangborn =

English footballer

Personal information
- Full name: Thomas Pangborn
- Date of birth: 1870
- Place of birth: Birmingham, England
- Date of death: 1926 (aged 55–56)
- Position: Winger

Senior career*
Years	Team	Apps	(Gls)
1891–1892	Warwick County		
1892–1894	Walsall Town Swifts	5	(1)
1894–1895	Worcester Rovers		
1895	West Bromwich Albion	0	(0)
1895–1896	Ashton North End		
1896–1898	Bury	23	(1)
1898–1899	Grimsby Town	3	(0)
1899	Ashton North End		
1899–1900	New Brompton		
1900	Tottenham Hotspur	2	(0)
1901	Reading		
1901–190?	Watford		
- * Club domestic league appearances and goals

Thomas Pangborn (1870 – 1926) was an English professional footballer who played as a winger.

Pangborn was signed by Tottenham in April 1900, in the 1900–01 season he recorded just two Southern League appearances. He joined Reading in January 1901.
