= Frederick Augustus Griffiths =

- Died: 1869
- Military career
- Allegiance: United Kingdom
- Branch: British Army
- Service years: 1813–?
- Rank: Major
- Unit: Royal Artillery

Major Frederick Augustus Griffiths (died 1869) was an officer of the British Army and military writer.

== Biography ==
Griffiths entered the army as an ensign in the Royal Artillery on 13 December 1813. He was gazetted lieutenant on 8 October 1816, captain on 19 August 1835, and major on 28 November 1854. Griffiths wrote The Artillerist's Manual and Compendium of Infantry Exercise (first edition published in 1840) and Notes on Military Law (1841). He died in 1869.
