= Tom Pratt (footballer, born 1873) =

English footballer (1873–1935)

Personal information
- Full name: Thomas Peet Pratt
- Date of birth: 28 August 1873
- Place of birth: Fleetwood, England
- Date of death: 1935 (aged 61–62)
- Position: Inside forward

Senior career*
Years	Team	Apps	(Gls)
1894–1895	Fleetwood Rangers		
1895–1896	Grimsby Town	29	(15)
1896–1899	Preston North End	71	(24)
1899–1900	Tottenham Hotspur	26	(19)
1900–1902	Preston North End	54	(16)
1902–1902	Fleetwood		
1902–1903	Preston North End	19	(3)
1903–1904	Woolwich Arsenal	8	(2)
1904–1905	Fulham		
1905–1906	Blackpool	8	(2)
1906–1907	Fleetwood		
1907–190?	Blackpool	0	(0)
- * Club domestic league appearances and goals

Thomas Peet Pratt (28 August 1873 – 1935) was an English footballer active in the late 19th and early 20th centuries, known for his goal-scoring prowess as a forward-inside forward.

== Career ==
Pratt began his football career with Fleetwood Rangers in 1894. A year later, he moved to Grimsby Town, where he continued to develop as a striker. In 1896, he signed with Preston North End, remaining at the club for three seasons and establishing himself as a reliable attacker.

In April 1899, Pratt transferred toTottenham Hotspur. His made his debut in the club's first Southern League match of the season, a 3–1 away victory against Millwall. During his one season with Tottenham, Pratt played a pivotal role in the team's Southern League campaign. He was the club's top scorer, netting an impressive 54 goals in 60 appearances across all competitions. Despite his on-field success, Pratt reportedly did not feel settled at the club and returned to Preston North End in 1900, where he stayed until July 1903. Over the course of the season, he made 10 appearances for Arsenal, scoring one goal.

Following his brief spell at Arsenal, Pratt joined Fulham in August 1904, continuing his career in English football.

== Honours ==
Tottenham Hotspur

- Southern Football League winner: 1899–1900
