= Ted Hughes (footballer) =

Welsh footballer

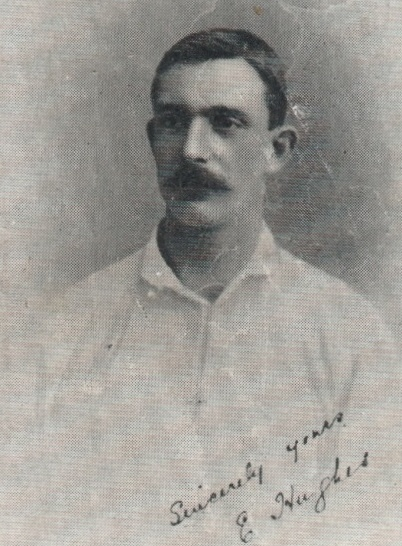

Personal information
- Full name: Edward Hughes
- Date of birth: 1876
- Place of birth: Ruabon, Wales
- Date of death: June 16, 1936 (aged 59–60)
- Height: 5 ft 6 in (1.68 m)
- Position: Left half

Senior career*
Years	Team	Apps	(Gls)
1898–1899	Everton	8	(0)
1899–1908	Tottenham Hotspur	148	(8)
- Clyde

International career
1899–1907	Wales	14	(0)
- * Club domestic league appearances and goals

Edward Hughes (1876-16 June 1936) was a professional footballer who played for clubs including Everton, Tottenham Hotspur and Clyde, and represented Wales on 14 occasions.

== Career ==
Hughes joined Tottenham in 1899 from Everton. At Spurs, the left half played one game of the Southern League when Tottenham won the competition for the first time. The following season he was a member of the 1901 FA Cup Final winning team.

== Career statistics ==
=== International ===
Appearances and goals by national team and year
National team	Year	Apps	Goals
Wales	1899	2	0
Wales	1901	2	0
Wales	1902	1	0
Wales	1904	3	0
Wales	1905	3	0
Wales	1906	2	0
Wales	1907	1	0
Total		14	0

== Honours ==
Tottenham Hotspur

- Southern League: 1899-1900
- FA Cup: 1900–01
