= John Barlow (footballer, born 1875) =

English footballer

Personal information
- Full name: John Barlow
- Date of birth: 1875
- Place of birth: Prescot, Lancashire, England
- Height: 5 ft 7 in (1.70 m)
- Position: Inside forward

Youth career
- Prescot

Senior career*
Years	Team	Apps	(Gls)
1897–1898	Everton	4	(0)
1898–1901	Reading		
1901–1903	Tottenham Hotspur	6	(0)
1903	Reading		
1903	Leicester Fosse		
- * Club domestic league appearances and goals

John Barlow (born 1875, date of death unknown) was an English footballer who played for Everton, Reading, Tottenham Hotspur and Leicester Fosse.

== Career ==
Barlow started his career at Everton in 1897 having recorded only four football league games before moving to Reading in May 1898. He was at the club for three years and then moved to Tottenham Hotspur in 1901. His debut for Spurs occurred on 21 October 1901 in a Western League home game against Bristol Rovers which Tottenham won 4–1. Barlow was at Spurs for two seasons and then returned to Reading in February 1903. However he wasn't there that long and was released from the club in May. Barlow was last known to play for Leicester Fosse for one season.

== Bibliography ==
- Soar, Phil (1995). Tottenham Hotspur The Official Illustrated History 1882–1995. Hamlyn. ISBN 0-600-58706-1.
- Goodwin, Bob (1992). The Spurs Alphabet. ACL & Polar Publishing (UK) Ltd. ISBN 0-9514862-8-4.
