= 1900–01 FA Cup =

Tournament details
- Country: England; Wales

Final positions
- Champions: Tottenham Hotspur (1st title)
- Runners-up: Sheffield United

Tournament statistics
- Top goal scorer: Sandy Brown (15 goals)

The 1900–01 FA Cup was the 30th season of the world's oldest association football competition, the Football Association Challenge Cup (more usually known as the FA Cup). The cup was won by Tottenham Hotspur of the Southern League, who defeated Sheffield United 3–1 in a replay after a 2–2 draw in the first game. This is the only occasion since the formation of The Football League in 1888 that a club from outside the League has won the cup.

Matches were scheduled to be played at the stadium of the team named first on the date specified for each round, which was always a Saturday. If scores were level after 90 minutes had been played, a replay would take place at the stadium of the second-named team later the same week. If the replayed match was drawn further replays would be held at neutral venues until a winner was determined. If scores were level after 90 minutes had been played in a replay, a 30-minute period of extra time would be played.

== Calendar ==
The format of the FA Cup for the season had a preliminary round, five qualifying rounds, an intermediate round, three proper rounds, and the semi-finals and final.

Round	Date
Preliminary round	Saturday 22 September 1900
First round qualifying	Saturday 6 October 1900
Second round qualifying	Saturday 20 October 1900
Third round qualifying	Saturday 3 November 1900
Fourth round qualifying	Saturday 17 November 1900
Fifth round qualifying	Saturday 8 December 1900
Intermediate Round	Saturday 5 January 1901
First round proper	Saturday 9 February 1901
Second round proper	Saturday 23 February 1901
Third round proper	Saturday 23 March 1901
Semi-finals	Saturday 6 April 1901
Final	Saturday 20 April 1901

== Intermediate round ==
Due to the increasing number of non-league clubs entering the competition at the turn of the 20th century, the Football Association introduced an Intermediate Round to the format to reduce the number of Football League teams commencing in the qualifying rounds.

The Intermediate Round was part of the competition proper and featured ten ties played between the winners from the fifth qualifying round, and ten teams given byes. Liverpool and Stoke from the First Division and Burslem Port Vale, Glossop, Grimsby Town, Newton Heath, New Brighton Tower and Woolwich Arsenal from the Second Division received byes to this round, as did Southern League teams Portsmouth and Bristol City.

The other Second Division sides had to gain entry to this round through the earlier qualifying rounds. Barnsley, Blackpool, Burton Swifts, Chesterfield, Gainsborough Trinity, Lincoln City, Middlesbrough, Stockport County and Walsall were all entered in the third qualifying round. Of these, only Chesterfield, Middlesbrough and Walsall reached the Intermediate Round. They were joined by non-league sides Darwen, Crewe Alexandra, Kettering, Bristol Rovers, Reading, Luton Town and West Ham United. Bristol Rovers and future Cup champions West Ham United were appearing in the competition proper for the first time.

The ten matches were played on 5 January 1901. The Reading v Bristol City tie went to a replay which was played in the following midweek. This rematch again resulted in a draw, so a second replay was played the following week at a neutral venue (Swindon Town's County Ground).

Tie no	Home team	Score	Away team	Date
1	Chesterfield	3–0	Walsall	5 January 1901
2	Darwen	0–2	Woolwich Arsenal	5 January 1901
3	Kettering	1–0	Crewe Alexandra	5 January 1901
4	Stoke	1–0	Glossop	5 January 1901
5	Reading	1–1	Bristol City	5 January 1901
Replay	Bristol City	0–0	Reading	9 January 1901
Replay	Reading	2–1	Bristol City	14 January 1901
6	Grimsby Town	0–1	Middlesbrough	5 January 1901
7	Burslem Port Vale	1–3	New Brighton Tower	5 January 1901
8	Luton Town	1–2	Bristol Rovers	5 January 1901
9	Newton Heath	3–0	Portsmouth	5 January 1901
10	West Ham United	0–1	Liverpool	5 January 1901

== First round proper ==
The first round proper contained sixteen ties between 32 teams. The remaining 16 of 18 Football League First Division sides were given a bye to this round, as were Small Heath, Burnley and Leicester Fosse of the Second Division and Southern League First Division clubs Southampton, Millwall Athletic and Tottenham Hotspur. They joined the ten teams who won in the intermediate round.

The matches were played on Saturday 9 February 1901. Four matches were drawn, with the replays taking place in the following midweek.

Tie no	Home team	Score	Away team	Date
1	Kettering	1–1	Chesterfield	9 February 1901
Replay	Chesterfield	1–2	Kettering	13 February 1901
2	Southampton	1–3	Everton	9 February 1901
3	Stoke	1–1	Small Heath	9 February 1901
Replay	Small Heath	2–1	Stoke	13 February 1901
4	Reading	2–0	Bristol Rovers	9 February 1901
5	Notts County	2–0	Liverpool	9 February 1901
6	Nottingham Forest	5–1	Leicester Fosse	9 February 1901
7	Aston Villa	5–0	Millwall Athletic	9 February 1901
8	The Wednesday	0–1	Bury	9 February 1901
9	Bolton Wanderers	1–0	Derby County	9 February 1901
10	Wolverhampton Wanderers	5–1	New Brighton Tower	9 February 1901
11	Middlesbrough	3–1	Newcastle United	9 February 1901
12	West Bromwich Albion	1–0	Manchester City	9 February 1901
13	Sunderland	1–2	Sheffield United	9 February 1901
14	Newton Heath	0–0	Burnley	9 February 1901
Replay	Burnley	7–1	Newton Heath	13 February 1901
15	Woolwich Arsenal	2–0	Blackburn Rovers	9 February 1901
16	Tottenham Hotspur	1–1	Preston North End	9 February 1901
Replay	Preston North End	2–4	Tottenham Hotspur	13 February 1901

== Second round proper ==
The eight Second Round matches were scheduled for Saturday 23 February 1901. There was one replay, between Aston Villa and Nottingham Forest, played in the following midweek.

Tie no	Home team	Score	Away team	Date
1	Notts County	2–3	Wolverhampton Wanderers	23 February 1901
2	Aston Villa	0–0	Nottingham Forest	23 February 1901
Replay	Nottingham Forest	1–3	Aston Villa	27 February 1901
3	Bolton Wanderers	0–1	Reading	23 February 1901
4	Middlesbrough	5–0	Kettering	23 February 1901
5	Small Heath	1–0	Burnley	23 February 1901
6	Sheffield United	2–0	Everton	23 February 1901
7	Woolwich Arsenal	0–1	West Bromwich Albion	23 February 1901
8	Tottenham Hotspur	2–1	Bury	23 February 1901

== Third round proper ==
The four Third Round matches were scheduled for Saturday, 23 March 1901. Two replays were needed, played in the following midweek.

Tie no	Home team	Score	Away team	Date
1	Reading	1–1	Tottenham Hotspur	23 March 1901
Replay	Tottenham Hotspur	3–0	Reading	27 March 1901
2	Wolverhampton Wanderers	0–4	Sheffield United	23 March 1901
3	Middlesbrough	0–1	West Bromwich Albion	23 March 1901
4	Small Heath	0–0	Aston Villa	23 March 1901
Replay	Aston Villa	1–0	Small Heath	27 March 1901

== Semi-finals ==
The semi-final matches were both intended to be played on Saturday 6 April 1901. Sheffield United and Aston Villa played on this date, but drew their tie and had to replay it five days later; this next match finished in a 3–0 win for United. The other game, Tottenham Hotspur against West Bromwich Albion, was delayed until Monday 8 April and finished in a convincing win for Spurs.

6 April 1901
15:00

Sheffield United	2–2	Aston Villa

City Ground, Nottingham

Replay

11 April 1901
15:00

Sheffield United	3–0	Aston Villa

Baseball Ground, Derby

8 April 1901
15:00

Tottenham Hotspur	4–0	West Bromwich Albion

Villa Park, Birmingham

== Final ==
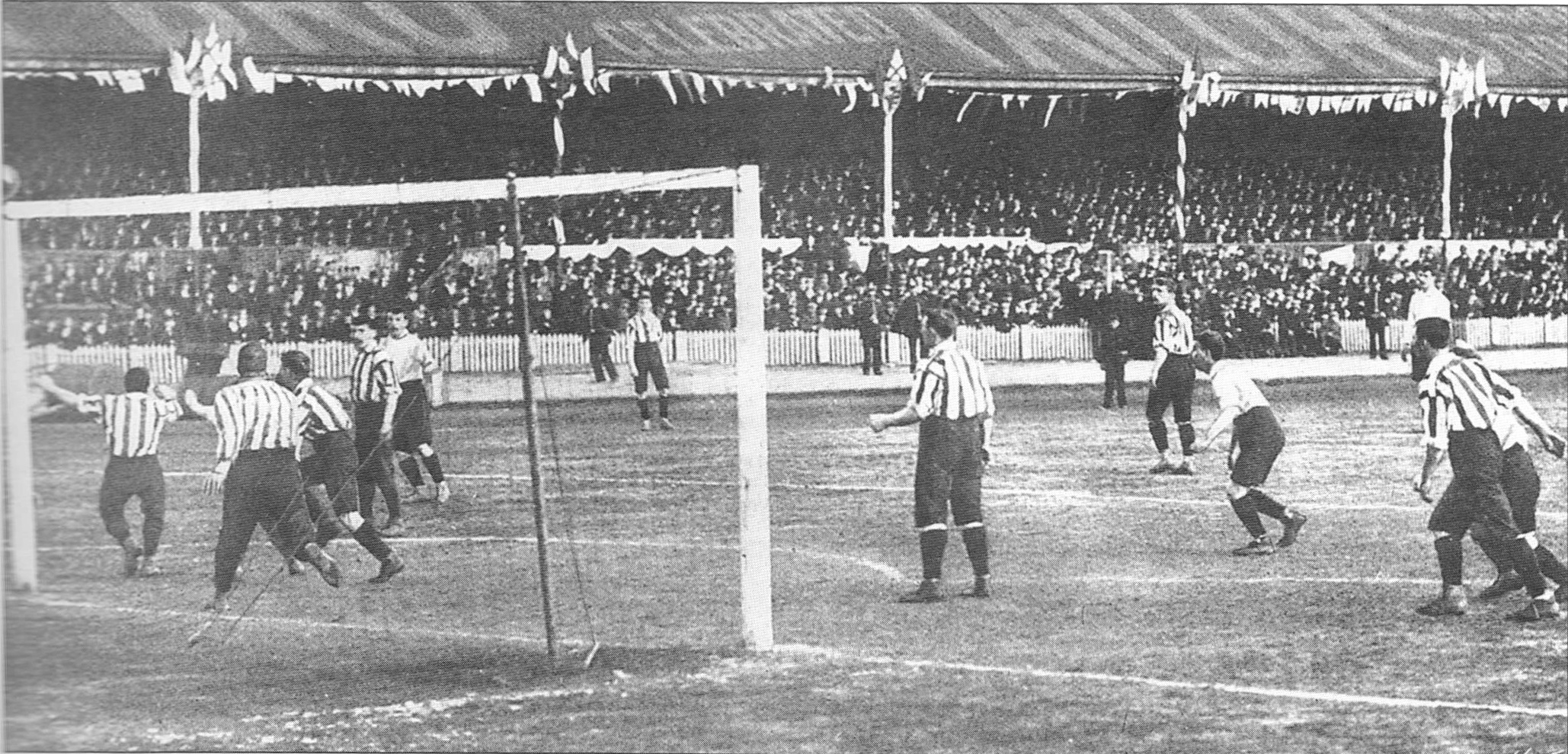
Sandy Brown scored for Tottenham in the replay

The final took place on Saturday 20 April 1901 at Crystal Palace. Over 110,000 supporters attended the match. Fred Priest opened the scoring for Sheffield United after about 20 minutes. Sandy Brown headed an equalising goal for Spurs shortly afterwards and half time arrived with the score 1–1. Brown put Spurs ahead early in the second half, but, not to be denied, Sheffield United pressed strongly, and Walter Bennett headed an equaliser for the draw.

In the replay, Spurs became the first and only "non- (Football) league" side to win the FA Cup since the creation of the Football League when they beat United 3–1 before an attendance of 20,470 at Burnden Park, Bolton. John Cameron opened the scoring before centre forward Sandy Brown became the first player to score in every round. He netted both goals in the final as well as one in the replay for a total of 15 in the season's competition.

=== Match details ===
20 April 1901
15:30 GMT

Tottenham Hotspur	2–2	Sheffield United
Brown 23' 51'		Priest 10'; Bennett 52'

Crystal Palace, London
Attendance: 114,815
Referee: A. Kingscott

Tottenham Hotspur	Sheffield United

=== Replay ===
27 April 1901
15:00 GMT

Tottenham Hotspur	3–1	Sheffield United
Cameron 52'; Smith 76'; Brown 87'		Priest 40'

Burnden Park, Bolton
Attendance: 20,470
Referee: A. Kingscott
