= Tom Morris (footballer, born 1875) =

English footballer (1875–1942)

Thomas Morris
Personal information
- Full name: Thomas H. Morris
- Date of birth: 9 February 1875
- Place of birth: Grantham, England
- Date of death: 25 April 1942 (aged 67)
- Position: Half-back

Senior career*
Years	Team	Apps	(Gls)
- Grantham Rovers
–1899	Gainsborough Trinity		
1899–1913	Tottenham Hotspur	63	(2)
- * Club domestic league appearances and goals

Thomas H. Morris (9 February 1875 – 25 April 1942) was a professional footballer who played during the 1890s and 1900s, initially for Grantham Rovers and Gainsborough Trinity before making a name for himself as at half-back for Tottenham Hotspur.

== Career ==
Morris played for Tottenham in the first game played at White Hart Lane on 4 September 1899, a friendly, against Notts County when 5,000 spectators turned up to see Spurs win 4–1. In 1901 he was part of the FA Cup winning team which beat Sheffield United 3–1 in the replay at Burnden Park after drawing 2–2 in the first match at Crystal Palace. This was also the first and only time a non-league team won the FA Cup.

Morris made 523 appearances for Spurs including 63 (scoring two goals) after the club was elected to the Football League. His playing career lasted 13 years. After retirement from playing until his death on 25 April 1942 he remained a member of the ground staff.

== Honours ==
Tottenham Hotspur

- Southern League: 1899–1900
- FA Cup: 1900–01
