= Fred Griffiths (footballer) =

Welsh footballer (1873–1917)

Personal information
- Full name: Frederick John Griffiths
- Date of birth: 13 September 1873
- Place of birth: Presteigne, Wales
- Date of death: 30 October 1917 (aged 44)
- Place of death: Passchendaele salient, Belgium
- Height: 6 ft 2 in (1.88 m)
- Position: Goalkeeper

Senior career*
Years	Team	Apps	(Gls)
1894–1896	South Shore		
1896–1897	Clitheroe		
1897–1899	South Shore		
1899–1900	Blackpool		
1900	Stalybridge Rovers		
1900–1901	Millwall Athletic	34	(0)
1901–1902	Tottenham Hotspur	9 (Note: Southern League appearances only)	(0)
1902	Preston North End	10	(0)
1902–1904	West Ham United	49	(0)
1904–1906	New Brompton	52	(0)
1906–????	Middlesbrough	0	(0)
- Moore's Athletic

International career
1900	Wales	2	(0)
- * Club domestic league appearances and goals

Frederick John Griffiths (13 September 1873 – 30 October 1917) was a Welsh footballer. A goalkeeper, he won two caps for the Welsh national team. He was killed in action during the First World War.

== Career ==
Born in Presteigne, the son of a coal merchant, Griffiths played junior football in Wales before beginning his senior career with the Blackpool-based club South Shore in 1895. He went on to play for other Lancashire-based clubs Clitheroe, Blackpool and Stalybridge Rovers. On 3 February 1900, while on the books of Blackpool, he made his debut for Wales in an international match against Scotland at Aberdeen and later in the year played against England, making him the first Blackpool player to win an international cap. He also played in the club's first ever match at Bloomfield Road.

He later moved south to join Millwall Athletic before moving across London to join Tottenham Hotspur, then playing in the Southern Football League. Griffiths was signed as backup to George Clawley. He made his debut for Spurs on 9 September 1901 in the Western League against Reading and kept a clean sheet in a 4–0 win. During the middle of the season when Clawley got injured Griffiths played more games for Tottenham, including all three first round FA Cup games against Southampton. Upon Clawley's return, he went back to reserve games.

In March 1902 Griffiths returned to Lancashire to join Preston North End of the Football League. He made ten league appearances for the club before once more returning to London to play for West Ham United in 1902. He replaced William Biggar in goal after Biggar conceded five goals in a defeat to Wellingborough Town, and remained the club's first-choice goalkeeper for two seasons. In the summer of 1904 he joined New Brompton of the Southern League. In his first season with the club he was an ever-present, making 36 appearances. Midway through the following season, however, he lost his place to John Martin, normally a full-back. The Athletic News referred to Martin playing as goalkeeper as a trial arrangement, but he retained the position and Griffiths only played one more game for the New Brompton first team.

Griffiths next joined Middlesbrough but never played for the club's first team, before a final move to minor club Moore's Athletic of Shirebrook, where he also worked as a coalminer.

== Post-playing career ==
After retiring from playing, Griffiths worked as a coal miner in the Midlands and trained local teams in Shirebrook before joining the British Army during World War I. He served with the 15th Battalion, Sherwood Foresters (Notts and Derby Regiment), reaching the rank of serjeant. The unit had originally been raised as a bantam battalion in Nottingham in 1915. By 1917 the battalion was part of 35th Division which was thrown into the Battle of Passchendaele in October 1917. Griffiths was killed in action on 30 October 1917, along with four others of his battalion (another 15 were wounded that day). He is buried at the Dozinghem Military Cemetery in West Flanders, Belgium.

== Bibliography ==
- Soar, Phil (1995). Tottenham Hotspur The Official Illustrated History 1882–1995. Hamlyn. ISBN 0-600-58706-1.
- Goodwin, Bob (1992). The Spurs Alphabet. ACL & Polar Publishing (UK) Ltd. ISBN 0-9514862-8-4.
