= David Copeland (footballer) =

Scottish footballer

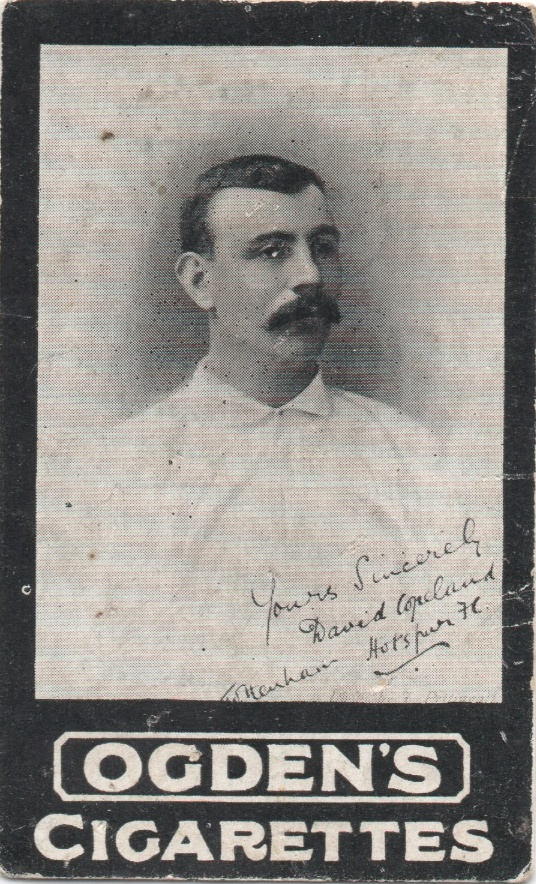

Personal information
- Full name: David Campbell Copeland
- Date of birth: 2 April 1875
- Place of birth: Ayr, Scotland
- Date of death: 16 November 1931 (aged 56)
- Position: Forward

Senior career*
Years	Team	Apps	(Gls)
- Ayr Parkhouse
1893–1897	Walsall Town Swifts	76	(19)
1898–1899	Bedminster	25	(6)
1899–1905	Tottenham Hotspur	131	(36)
1905–1906	Chelsea	26	(9)
1907–?	Glossop North End	2	(0)
- * Club domestic league appearances and goals

David Copeland (2 April 1875 – 16 November 1931) was a professional footballer who played for Ayr Parkhouse, Walsall Town Swifts, Bedminster, Tottenham Hotspur, Chelsea and Glossop North End.

== Football career ==
Copeland a forward played for his local team Ayr Parkhouse before joining Walsall Town Swifts in 1893 where he featured in 76 matches, scoring on 19 occasions. After playing for Bedminster in 1898–99, Copeland joined Tottenham Hotspur in May 1899. His first game for Spurs was an away match in the Southern League against Millwall which Tottenham won 3–1. He helped Tottenham to win the Southern Football League in the 1899–1900 season and in the following season of 1900–01 he helped guide the club to their first FA Cup win. He moved on to Chelsea in 1905 and featured in 26 matches and finding the net nine times, up until he broke his leg which nearly finished his career. Copeland ended his career at Glossop North End where he made a further two appearances.

After finishing football he worked at the Rose and Crown hotel in Erdington in Birmingham. It was reported and noted in Goodwins Spurs Alphabet that Copeland collapsed and died while chopping wood.

== Honours ==
Tottenham Hotspur

- 1899-1900: Southern League Winner
- 1901 FA Cup Final: Winner

== Bibliography ==
- Soar, Phil (1995). Tottenham Hotspur The Official Illustrated History 1882–1995. Hamlyn. ISBN 0-600-58706-1.
- Goodwin, Bob (1992). The Spurs Alphabet. ACL & Polar Publishing (UK) Ltd. ISBN 0-9514862-8-4.
