= Jack Kirwan =

Irish football player and coach (1872-1959)

John Kirwan
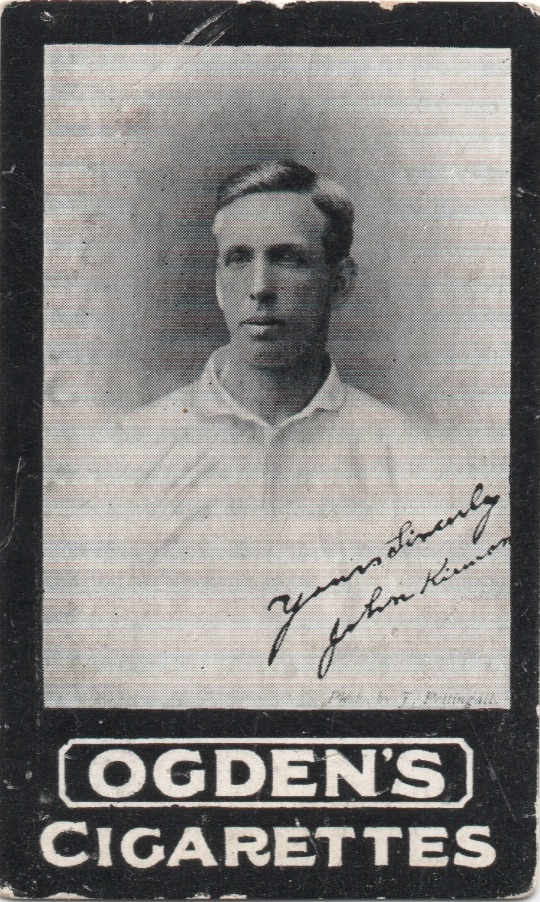

Personal information
- Full name: John Henry Kirwan
- Date of birth: 2 December 1872
- Place of birth: Dunlavin, County Wicklow, Ireland
- Date of death: 7 January 1959 (aged 86)
- Place of death: Edgware, London, England
- Height: 5 ft 6 in (1.68 m)
- Position: Outside left

Senior career*
| Years | Team | Apps | (Gls) |
| 189x–1898 | Southport Central | | |
| 1898–1899 | Everton | 24 | (5) |
| 1899–1905 | Tottenham Hotspur | 154 | (39) |
| 1905–1908 | Chelsea | 73 | (15) |
| 1908–1909 | Clyde | | |
| 1909–1910 | Leyton | 49 | (6) |

International career
| 1900–1909 | Ireland | 17 | (2) |

Managerial career
- 1910–1915: Ajax
- 1920–21: Bohemians
- 1923–24: Livorno
- 1924–25: Bohemians
- * Club domestic league appearances and goals

John Henry Kirwan (2 December 1872 – 7 January 1959) was an Irish football player and coach. As a player, he was described as an out and out winger with good pace and skills, playing as an outside-left for, among others, Everton, Tottenham Hotspur, Chelsea and Ireland. As a football coach he became the first professional manager of Dutch side Ajax. He was the last survivor of the Tottenham team that won the 1901 FA Cup. In his early life he played Gaelic football for Dublin, winning an All-Ireland SFC medal in 1894.

== Playing career ==
=== Early years ===
Kirwan initially played Gaelic football for the Dublin county team and won an All-Ireland SFC medal with Dublin in 1894 when they defeated Cork by 1–2 to 0–5 after a replay. Although both the final and the replay finished level, Dublin were awarded the cup. He then played soccer joined Southport Central of the Lancashire League where he attracted the attentions of both Everton and Blackburn Rovers. He opted to sign for Everton in July 1898 and was subsequently used to replace John Cameron who had been sold to Tottenham Hotspur. He made his league debut for Everton against Preston N.E. in September 1898. During his one season at the club he made 24 league appearances and scored 5 goals. He also played a further 2 games in the FA Cup. While at Everton his teammates included among others Samuel Wolstenholme.

=== Tottenham Hotspur ===
After just one season at Everton, Kirwan followed John Cameron to Tottenham Hotspur where the latter was now manager. During his six seasons at Tottenham, he played alongside John Brearley and Vivian Woodward. Kirwan scored 97 goals in 347 games for the club. This included 23 in games in the FA Cup. He also helped the club win the Southern League in 1900 and the FA Cup in 1901. This saw Tottenham become the only club outside the English League to win the competition. Kirwan kept the ball used in the final until he died in 1959. In 1900, Kirwan also became the first Spurs player capped by Ireland.

=== Chelsea, and later years ===
On 3 May 1905, Kirwan left Southern League Tottenham Hotspur and joined the newly-formed Chelsea. Kirwan, already established as Ireland captain by this point, was a virtual ever-present in his first season with the West London side, playing 36 games and scoring 8 goals as the team narrowly missed out on promotion to the First Division after a dramatic late-season collapse. He made 75 appearances in total for Chelsea, scoring 16 goals. In 1907, he helped Chelsea finish runners up in the Second Division and thus gain promotion. Kirwan also played three games for Chelsea in the FA Cup, scoring one goal. After leaving Chelsea, he played for Clyde and Leyton F.C., before retiring as a player.

=== Irish international ===
Between 1900 and 1909, Kirwan played 17 times for Ireland. He made his international debut on 24 February 1900 in a 2–0 away defeat to Wales. Kirwan, together with Archie Goodall, Billy Scott, Billy McCracken and Robert Milne, was a member of the Ireland team that clinched a share in the 1903 British Home Championship. Until then the competition had been monopolised by England and Scotland. However, in 1903, before goal difference was applied, Ireland forced a three way share. Despite losing their opening game 4–0 to England, the Irish then beat Scotland for the first time on 21 March 1903. Kirwan scored his first goal for Ireland in the 2–0 win at Celtic Park. He then helped Ireland beat Wales 2–0 in the final game of the tournament. He scored his second goal for Ireland in a 3–1 defeat to England on 12 March 1904. Kirwan captained the side during its 1905 and 1906 Home Championship campaigns. His final game for Ireland was a 5–0 defeat to Scotland on 15 March 1909.

== Coaching career ==
In September 1910, Kirwan moved to the Netherlands where he became the first professional manager at Ajax. In 1911, he led Ajax to the Dutch Second Class title and victory in a promotion play-off, thus guiding the club into the Dutch top flight for the first time. Kirwan returned to London after the outbreak of the First World War and was succeeded as Ajax coach by Jack Reynolds. Kirwan later coached Bohemians in his native country and Livorno in Italy for one season, before settling in the London area.

== Additional information ==
John Kirwan was survived by his widow Edith who died in 1976, and daughters Eileen who died aged 101 in 2014 and Maureen who died aged 94 in 2009. Many of his international caps and shirts are still in the family, although a lot of his more historical possessions were given to the Tottenham Hotspur museum, including the 1901 FA Cup Ball.

Kirwan died aged 86 in the Burnt Oak area of Edgware in North London in 1959. He is buried at the Pinner Cemetery near Harrow.

== Career statistics ==
=== International ===
Appearances and goals by national team and year
| National team | Year | Apps | Goals |
|---|---|---|---|
| Ireland | 1900 | 1 | 0 |
| Ireland | 1902 | 2 | 0 |
| Ireland | 1903 | 3 | 1 |
| Ireland | 1903 | 3 | 1 |
| Ireland | 1905 | 3 | 0 |
| Ireland | 1906 | 3 | 0 |
| Ireland | 1907 | 1 | 0 |
| Ireland | 1909 | 1 | 0 |
| Total | | 17 | 2 |

As of match played 16 January 2023

Ireland score listed first, score column indicates score after each Kirwan goal

List of international goals scored by Jack Kirwan
| No. | Date | Venue | Cap | Opponent | Score | Result | Competition | Ref. |
|---|---|---|---|---|---|---|---|---|
| 1 | 21 March 1903 | Celtic Park, Glasgow, Scotland | 5 | Scotland | 2–0 | 2–0 | 1902–03 British Home Championship | |
| 2 | 12 March 1904 | Solitude, Belfast, Northern Ireland | 7 | England | 1–2 | 1–3 | 1903–04 British Home Championship | |

== Honours ==
=== As a Gaelic footballer ===
Dublin

- All-Ireland Senior Football Championship: 1894

=== As a soccer player ===
Tottenham Hotspur

- FA Cup: 1900–01
- Southern League: 1899–1900, runner up: 1901–02, 1903–04
- Western League: 1903–04
- Sheriff of London Charity Shield: 1902

Ireland

- British Home Championship: 1903 (shared)

== Sources ==
- Tony Matthews, Who's Who of Everton (2004)
- Bohemian F.C. Match Programme Vol. 41, No. 1
