= Len Hyde =

English footballer

Personal information
- Full name: Leonard Joseph Hyde
- Date of birth: 6 May 1876
- Place of birth: Birmingham, England
- Date of death: 30 December 1932 (aged 56)
- Place of death: Birmingham, England
- Height: 5 ft 8 in (1.73 m)
- Position: Winger

Youth career
- 1889: Summersfield Eclipse
- 1894: Harborne
- 1896: Kidderminster Harriers

Senior career*
Years	Team	Apps	(Gls)
189?–1899	Wellingborough Town		
1899–1902	Tottenham Hotspur	17	(5)
1902−1903	Wellingborough Town		
1903–1904	Brighton & Hove Albion	29	(4)
1904–1905	Doncaster Rovers	32	(1)
1905–19??	Wellingborough Town		
- * Club domestic league appearances and goals

Leonard Joseph Hyde (6 May 1876 − 30 December 1932) was an English professional footballer who played as a winger (or midfielder) for a number of clubs around the turn of the 1900s.

Born in Birmingham, Hyde played for a few youth clubs including Kidderminster Harriers before he signed to Wellingborough Town until he moved to Tottenham Hotspur in May 1899. Hyde's debut for Tottenham was a Southern District Combinations league match against Reading in October 1899. He played for Spurs from 1899 to 1902 in the Southern and District Combination League, the Southern League and the Western League. In his last season at the club he captained the reserve team.

He then returned to Wellingborough and in the 1903−04 season he was at Brighton & Hove Albion.

For the 1904−05 season he moved to Doncaster Rovers who had just been elected to the Football League. He scored once, against Leicester Fosse, in a total of 33 League and FA Cup matches. Following Doncaster's unsuccessful application for re-election to League 2 for 1905−06, he again returned to Wellingborough Town.

Hyde died in Birmingham in 1932 at the age of 56.

== Honours ==
Tottenham Hotspur

- Southern League First Division: 1899–1900

== Bibliography ==
- Goodwin, Bob (1992). The Spurs Alphabet. ACL & Polar Publishing (UK) Ltd. ISBN 0-9514862-8-4.
