= Jack Jones (footballer, born 1869) =

Welsh footballer and cricketer

Personal information
- Full name: John Leonard Jones
- Date of birth: 1869
- Place of birth: Rhuddlan, Wales
- Date of death: 24 November 1931
- Place of death: Sunderland, England
- Position: Outside left

Youth career
- 1882–1886: Bootle Wanderers

Senior career*
Years	Team	Apps	(Gls)
1886–1890	Bootle		
1890–1893	Stockton		
1893–1894	Grimsby Town	28	(7)
1894–1897	Sheffield United	32	(5)
1897–1904	Tottenham Hotspur	132	(6)
1904–1905	Watford		
1905–1907	Worcester City		

International career
1895–1904	Wales	21	(0)
- * Club domestic league appearances and goals

John Leonard Jones (1869 – 24 November 1931) was a Welsh professional footballer and amateur cricketer. He played football for Bootle, Stockton, Grimsby Town, Sheffield United, Tottenham Hotspur, Watford and Worcester City. Jones also played cricket for Stockton Cricket Club and Sheffield United Cricket Club. Born in Rhuddlan, he represented Wales on 21 occasions.

== Career ==
Jones began his career with Bootle Wanderers, before joining Bootle, having grown up in the area. On moving to Stockton in 1890, Jones turned professional and also played cricket for Stockton Cricket Club during the summer months. When Stockton resumed amateur status in 1893, Jones moved to Grimsby Town, for whom he made his Football League debut in September 1893, remaining ever present for the remainder of the season.

In May 1894, Jones transferred to Sheffield United, in part to play for the affiliated Sheffield United Cricket Club that summer. When the football season opened in September 1894, Jones made his footballing debut for the club against West Bromwich Albion and scored on each of his first two outings. Despite a promising start Jones was felt not to lack pace and spent much of his time playing in United's reserves, filling in for various positions on the first team when needed.

After three seasons, Jones joined Tottenham Hotspur in May 1897, but as Spurs were not members of the Football League they did not have to pay a transfer fee to United, much to the annoyance of their directors. Playing principally in the outside left position for his new club, Jones became a mainstay of the first-team for seven seasons, becoming club captain and skippering the 1901 FA Cup Final winning side, ironically beating his former club, Sheffield United.

== Later life ==
Club secretary of Sheffield United, Joseph Wostinholm, arranged for Jones to take up a summer coaching position with Rugby School shortly before he left the club, adding to his former employers annoyance at his departure. Jones continued to coach both cricket and football at the school whilst playing for Tottenham Hotspur. Following his retirement from playing football, Jones coached Bohemian F.C. in Ireland around 1906 and later coached in South Africa. In 1923, Jones returned to England and became coach and groundsman at Whitburn Cricket Club in Durham. Jones later worked as a pattern maker but died after sustaining head injuries while falling down a stairwell at work in 1931, aged 62.

== Career statistics ==
=== International ===
As of match played 16 January 2023

Appearances and goals by national team and year
National team	Year	Apps	Goals
Wales	1895	3	0
Wales	1896	3	0
Wales	1897	3	0
Wales	1898	3	0
Wales	1899	2	0
Wales	1900	1	0
Wales	1902	3	0
Wales	1904	3	0
Total		21	0

== Honours ==
Tottenham Hotspur

- Southern League: 1899–1900
- FA Cup: 1900–01
- London League: 1902–03
- Western League: 1903–04
