= George Clawley =

English footballer (1875-1920)

Personal information
- Date of birth: 10 April 1875
- Place of birth: Scholar Green, England
- Date of death: 16 July 1920 (aged 45)
- Place of death: Southampton, England
- Height: 6 ft 2 in (1.88 m)
- Position: Goalkeeper

Senior career*
Years	Team	Apps	(Gls)
1893–1894	Crewe Alexandra	3	(0)
1894–1896	Stoke	49	(0)
1896–1898	Southampton	42	(0)
1898–1899	Stoke	34	(0)
1899–1903	Tottenham Hotspur	82	(0)
1903–1907	Southampton	121	(0)
Total		331	(0)
- * Club domestic league appearances and goals

George Clawley (10 April 1875 – 16 July 1920) was an English professional goalkeeper who played for Stoke, Southampton and Tottenham Hotspur in the late nineteenth and early twentieth centuries. He was the goalkeeper for the Spurs side that won the 1901 FA Cup final.

== Career ==
=== Crewe Alexandra ===
Born at Scholar Green, near Congleton, he started his professional career with Crewe Alexandra in August 1893. He made three appearances for Crewe in the Football League Second Division in 1893–94 before being recruited by their First Division neighbours Stoke in September 1894.

=== Stoke ===
He soon displaced Bill Rowley in goal as Stoke struggled throughout the 1894–95 season finishing third from bottom and only avoiding relegation via the end of season test match. The following season Stoke were more successful finishing in sixth place. They also enjoyed an exciting FA Cup run to the quarter-finals where they were defeated 3–0 by Wolverhampton Wanderers.

=== Southampton ===
In the summer of 1896 he was persuaded to move south to join Southampton who were about to embark on their third season in the Southern League. In his first two-year spell with The Saints he was ever-present, captaining the south coast club to the Southern League title in both 1896–97 and 1897–98. According to Holley & Chalk's "The Alphabet of the Saints" Clawley was "one of the finest uncapped goalkeepers ever to grace the football field of England". He "possessed the physical requirements of height and reach that were to make him one of the greats around the turn of the century".

In addition to their league success, Southampton reached the FA Cup Semi-finals where they took Nottingham Forest to a replay. The replay at Crystal Palace was played in a blizzard. After a scoreless first half (in which Joe Turner missed a penalty for Southampton), in the second half Saints were on top when, with ten minutes left to play, referee John Lewis stopped the match for a time and the players left the pitch. No sooner had the game restarted than the weather worsened but the referee decided that the match should continue. Clawley had his eyes "choked with snow" and conceded two goals in the final minutes of the game. Despite Southampton's protests the F.A. decided that the result should stand – this was perhaps not surprising as Lewis was an eminent member of the F.A. board.

=== Return to Stoke ===
In May 1898 he returned to the Midlands, rejoining Stoke for the 1898–99 season. He took over the captaincy and playing all 34 matches as Stoke finished the league season in 12th place. Renowned for his ability to leave his line to catch crosses and corners, or clear through-balls from the feet of onrushing attackers at a time when goalkeepers usually left such duties to their defenders, Clawley became an early exponent of recovering quickly from making an initial save to block a follow-up. Once again Stoke had some success in the FA Cup, reaching the semi-finals where they were defeated 3–1 by a Steve Bloomer hat-trick for Derby County.

=== Tottenham Hotspur ===
In 1899 he moved to London to join Tottenham Hotspur, then in the Southern League. He broke his leg shortly after joining Spurs, thus missing an entire season, but he returned in 1900 to play his part in Spurs' FA Cup winning run. In the first match of the 1901 FA Cup final against Sheffield United, Spurs were 2–1 up (both goals from Sandy Brown) when in a goalmouth scramble Clawley turned the ball around the post for what should have been a corner. However, the referee Arthur Kingscott (despite being some way from the goalmouth) awarded a goal and the match went to a replay.

In the replay at Burnden Park, Bolton Spurs triumphed 3–1 on a wet and windy afternoon, and brought the Cup back to the south at last after eighteen years, thus becoming the first (and only) non-League team to win the Cup.

=== Return to Southampton ===
Clawley returned to Southampton in 1903, replacing England international Jack Robinson. Once again he helped the Saints to the Southern League title in 1903–04. He remained at The Dell until he retired in 1907. In his second, four-year, spell with the Saints he made 121 Southern League appearances.

== After football ==
After retiring from the game, he became landlord of the Wareham Arms Hotel in Southampton. He died on 16 July 1920 aged 45.

== Career statistics ==
Club	Season	League			FA Cup		Test Match		Total	
Club	Season	Division	Apps	Goals	Apps	Goals	Apps	Goals	Apps	Goals
Crewe Alexandra	1893–94	Second Division	3	0	0	0	—		3	0
Crewe Alexandra	Total		3	0	0	0	—		3	0
Stoke	1894–95	First Division	23	0	2	0	1	0	26	0
Stoke	1895–96	First Division	26	0	4	0	—		30	0
Stoke	Total		49	0	6	0	1	0	56	0
Southampton	1896–97	Southern League	20	0	7	0	—		27	0
Southampton	1897–98	Southern League	22	0	9	0	—		31	0
Southampton	Total		42	0	16	0	—		58	0
Stoke	1898–99	First Division	34	0	6	0	—		40	0
Stoke	Total		34	0	6	0	—		40	0
Tottenham Hotspur	1899–1900	Southern League	8	0	0	0	—		8	0
Tottenham Hotspur	1900–01	Southern League	25	0	8	0	—		33	0
Tottenham Hotspur	1901–02	Southern League	20	0	0	0	—		20	0
Tottenham Hotspur	1902–03	Southern League	29	0	4	0	—		33	0
Tottenham Hotspur	Total		82	0	12	0	—		94	0
Southampton	1903–04	Southern League	31	0	2	0	—		33	0
Southampton	1904–05	Southern League	31	0	3	0	—		34	0
Southampton	1905–06	Southern League	22	0	2	0	—		24	0
Southampton	1906–07	Southern League	37	0	3	0	—		40	0
Southampton	Total		121	0	10	0	—		131	0
Career total			331	0	50	0	1	0	382	0

== Honours ==
Tottenham Hotspur

- FA Cup winner: 1901

Southampton

- Southern League championship: 1896–97, 1897–98, 1903–04
