= James Melia (footballer, born 1874) =

English footballer (1874–1905)

Personal information
- Full name: James Melia
- Date of birth: 2 April 1874
- Place of birth: Darlington, England
- Date of death: February 1905 (aged 30)
- Position: Full-back

Senior career*
Years	Team	Apps	(Gls)
1896–1898	Sheffield Wednesday	0	(0)
1898–1901	Tottenham Hotspur	35	(1)
1901	Preston North End		
- * Club domestic league appearances and goals

James Melia (2 April 1874 - February 1905) was a professional football player who played for Sheffield Wednesday, Tottenham Hotspur and Preston North End.

== Career ==
Malia started his career with Sheffield Wednesday and spent two seasons at the club before moving to Tottenham Hotspur where he spent three seasons. After Spurs he had a spell with Preston North End. Then in February 1905 he fell ill and died at the age of 30.
