= Tom Smith (footballer, born 1876) =

English footballer (1876–1937)

Personal information
- Full name: Thomas Smith
- Date of birth: 26 November 1876
- Place of birth: Maryport, Cumberland, England
- Date of death: 1937 (aged 60–61)
- Position: Outside right

Senior career*
Years	Team	Apps	(Gls)
1895–1897	Preston North End	53	(8)
1898–1902	Tottenham Hotspur	88	(17)
1903–?	Preston North End	8	(3)
- Carlisle United
Relatives	James Lomas (half-brother)
- * Club domestic league appearances and goals

Tom Smith (26 November 1876 – 1937) was a professional footballer who played for Preston North End, Tottenham Hotspur and Carlisle United.

== Football career ==
Smith began his career at Preston North End in 1895 where he played 53 matches and scored on eight occasions up till 1897. Whilst at Preston, Smith played alongside his namesake, who subsequently joined Southampton.

The outside right went on to join Tottenham Hotspur. He was part of the squad that won the Southern League in 1899–1900 season, and featured in both matches in the 1901 FA Cup Final and scored the second Lilywhite's goal in their cup winning replay. He rejoined Preston in 1903 and played a further eight matches, scoring three goals. He later played for Carlisle United before ending his career at Maryport Tradesmen.

Tom Smith's Tottenham Hotspur 1901 FA Cup Winning Medal was up for auction on 26 October 2015 at Graham Budd Auctions, London.

== Personal life ==
Smith is the older brother of James Lomas, who played rugby league for Salford, and captained the first Great Britain team to tour Australia and New Zealand. Smith's mother, Sarah, had previously been married to John Smith, who was reportedly lost at sea in October 1870. Sarah subsequently met James Lomas senior, but they could not marry until Sarah's husband was officially declared dead. In his biography of Lomas, Morris surmises that "it is highly probable that Tom was their first child and, because they were not then wed, he inherited his mother's surname".

== Honours ==
Tottenham Hotspur

- Southern League: 1899–1900 - Winner
- 1901 FA Cup Final – Winner
