= Harry Erentz =

Scottish footballer

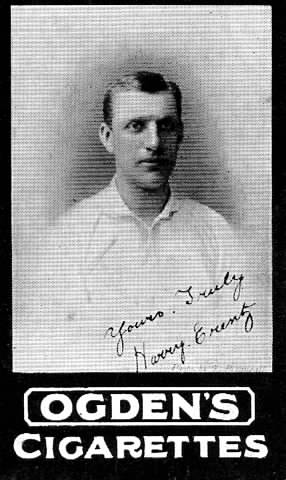

Personal information
- Full name: Henry Bernt Erentz
- Date of birth: 17 September 1874
- Place of birth: Dundee, Scotland
- Date of death: 19 July 1947 (aged 72)
- Place of death: Dundee, Scotland
- Height: 5 ft 11 in (1.80 m)
- Position: Full-back

Senior career*
Years	Team	Apps	(Gls)
1895–1896	Dundee	0	(0)
1896–1897	Oldham County	?	(?)
1897–1898	Newton Heath	6	(0)
1898–1904	Tottenham Hotspur	130	(0)
1904–1905	Swindon Town	16	(0)
- * Club domestic league appearances and goals

Henry Bernt Erentz (17 September 1874 – 19 July 1947) was a Scottish footballer who played as a right-back for various clubs in both Scotland and England.

== Career ==
Born in Dundee to a Danish father, Erentz began his football career with Dundee in 1895. At the end of the 1895–96 season, Erentz transferred to Oldham County, before signing for Newton Heath a year later, where he joined his brother Fred. It would be eight months, however, before Erentz made his debut for the Heathens, playing alongside his brother at full-back in a 5–1 away defeat to Woolwich Arsenal on 8 January 1898. Erentz only made nine appearances for Newton Heath (six in the league and three in the FA Cup) before being transferred to Tottenham Hotspur in May 1898.

Erentz remained with Tottenham for six years, making appearances in 130 Southern League games and over 250 games overall, including the 1901 FA Cup Final and replay against Sheffield United, helping Spurs to become the first club from outside The Football League to win the FA Cup. In December 1904, Erentz was transferred to Swindon Town, for whom he made 16 appearances before retiring through injury. He later became the trainer for London side Corinthians.

== Honours ==
Tottenham Hotspur

- Southern League: 1899–1900
- FA Cup winner: 1901
