= Walter Bennett (footballer, born 1874) =

English footballer

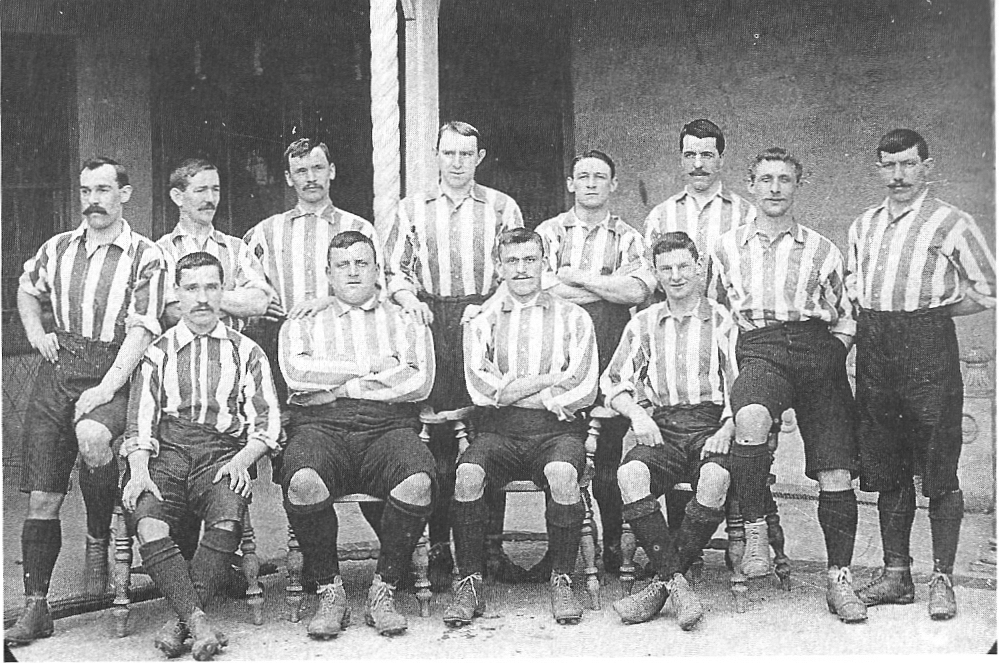
- The 1901 losing Cup Final team; Bennett is seated on the left.

Personal information
- Full name: Walter Bennett
- Date of birth: 29 April 1874
- Place of birth: Mexborough, England
- Date of death: 6 April 1908 (aged 33)
- Place of death: Denaby Main, England
- Position: Forward

Senior career*
Years	Team	Apps	(Gls)
- Mexborough
1896–1905	Sheffield United	195	(59)
1905–1907	Bristol City	48	(22)
1907–1908	Denaby United		

International career
1901	England	2	(0)
- * Club domestic league appearances and goals

Walter Bennett (29 April 1874 – 6 April 1908) was a professional footballer who is best known for his time with Sheffield United, where he played as a forward. He also made two appearances for England in 1901.

Born in Mexborough, during his time with the Blades he won the Division One championship in 1898 and two FA Cup winners medals in 1899 and 1902. He later went on to have a two-year spell at Bristol City before retiring from full-time football.

== Playing career ==
=== Club career ===
Nicknamed "Cocky", Bennett started his career with his home town club of Mexborough, where his form prompted Sheffield United to try and sign him on a number of occasions although both he and his father held out for a better deal. He eventually signed for the Blades in 1896 for a transfer fee of £10. Initially supporters felt Bennett had a surly attitude and was not fit enough to play at the top level as he was a heavy, thick-set man. Dropping two stones following a fitness regime, however, he showed a good turn of speed and became a mainstay of the Blades side that dominated the game in that period.

Bennett was the top scorer in the side that were crowned First Division Champions in 1898 and played in the FA Cup finals of 1899, 1901 and 1902, being on the losing side only in 1901.

Despite his success Bennett was placed on the transfer list in 1903 but persuaded United to give him a new contract and stayed with the South Yorkshire club until 1905, when he moved to Bristol City. Despite being past his prime, Bennett helped his new club to the Second Division championship in 1906 before retiring from full-time football.

=== International career ===
Bennett was awarded two caps for England, playing against Wales and Scotland in the 1901 Home Championship.

=== Honours ===
Sheffield United

- Division One champions: 1897–98
  - Runners-up: 1896–97 and 1899–1900
- FA Cup winners: 1899, 1902
  - Finalists: 1901

Bristol City

- Division Two champions: 1905–06

== Personal life ==
Bennett came from a footballing family: his brother William had played for The Wednesday and appeared in the 1890 FA Cup Final, whilst another brother 'Tip' played for Barnsley. After leaving Bristol City he moved to Denaby Main, where he took a job as a miner and played for the local amateur side. Bennett was killed in April 1908 following a roof fall at the Denaby Main Colliery as he was making his way back to the surface after his shift, leaving a widow and four children.
