= 1899–1900 Southern Football League =

The 1899–1900 season was the sixth in the history of the Southern League. This season saw the expansion of Division One up to 17 teams, though two of them resigned from league before the end of the season. Tottenham Hotspur were Division One champions for the first time, but no Southern League clubs applied for election to the Football League.

== Division One ==
Southern Football League Division One
- Season: 1899–1900
- Champions: Tottenham Hotspur (1st title)
- Promoted: none
- Relegated: Bedminster (merged); Sheppey United; Brighton United (resigned); Cowes (resigned)
- Matches: 210
- Goals: 676 (3.22 per match)

A total of 17 teams contested the division, including 13 sides from previous season and four new teams.

Teams promoted from Division Two

- Cowes
- Thames Ironworks

Newly elected teams

- Queens Park Rangers
- Bristol Rovers
- Portsmouth

Pos	Team	Pld	W	D	L	GF	GA	GR	Pts	Qualification or relegation
1	Tottenham Hotspur	28	20	4	4	67	26	2.577	44	
2	Portsmouth	28	20	1	7	59	29	2.034	41	Directly elected into Division One (Note: Portsmouth founded 5 April 1898, before Royal Artillery Portsmouth disbanded in 1899.)
3	Southampton	28	17	1	10	70	33	2.121	35	
4	Reading	28	15	2	11	41	28	1.464	32	
5	Swindon Town	28	15	2	11	50	42	1.190	32	
6	Bedminster	28	13	2	13	44	45	0.978	28	Left at end of season
7	Millwall Athletic	28	12	3	13	36	37	0.973	27	
8	Queens Park Rangers	28	12	2	14	50	58	0.862	26	
9	Bristol City	28	9	7	12	44	47	0.936	25	
10	Bristol Rovers	28	11	3	14	46	55	0.836	25	
11	New Brompton	28	9	6	13	39	49	0.796	24	
12	Gravesend United	28	10	4	14	38	58	0.655	24	
13	Chatham Town	28	10	3	15	38	58	0.655	23	
14	Thames Ironworks (Note: Changed name to West Ham United at end of season.)	28	8	5	15	30	45	0.667	21	Relegation test matches
15	Sheppey United	28	3	7	18	24	66	0.364	13	Relegation test matches
16	Brighton United	0	0	0	0	0	0	—	0	Resigned from league after 22 matches record expunged
17	Cowes	0	0	0	0	0	0	—	0	Resigned from league after 13 matches, record expunged

Source: rsssf.com
Rules for classification: The system of using goal average to separate two teams tied on points was used up until the 1976–77 season (note: source does not refer to goal average). The points system: 2 points for a win, 1 point for a draw and 0 points for losing.

== Division Two ==
Southern Football League Division Two
- Season: 1899–1900
- Champions: Watford
- Promoted: Watford
- Relegated: Wolverton L&NWR (resigned); Dartford (resigned)
- Matches: 110
- Goals: 437 (3.97 per match)

A total of 11 teams contested the division, including nine sides from previous season and two new teams.

Newly elected teams:

- Dartford - members of Kent League
- Grays United

Pos	Team	Pld	W	D	L	GF	GA	GR	Pts	Qualification or relegation
1	Watford	20	14	2	4	57	25	2.280	30	Promotion test matches
2	Fulham	20	10	4	6	44	23	1.913	24	Promotion test matches
3	Chesham Town	20	11	2	7	43	37	1.162	24	
4	Wolverton L&NWR	20	9	6	5	46	36	1.278	24	Left league at end of season
5	Grays United	20	8	6	6	63	29	2.172	22	
6	Shepherds Bush	20	9	4	7	45	37	1.216	22	
7	Dartford	20	8	3	9	36	44	0.818	19	Left league at end of season
8	Wycombe Wanderers	20	8	3	9	35	50	0.700	19	
9	Brentford	20	5	7	8	31	48	0.646	17	
10	Southall	20	6	3	11	21	44	0.477	15	
11	Maidenhead	20	1	2	17	16	64	0.250	4	

Source: rsssf.com
Rules for classification: The system of using goal average to separate two teams tied on points was used up until the 1976–77 season. The points system: 2 points for a win, 1 point for a draw and 0 points for losing.

== Promotion-relegation test matches ==
At the end of the season, test matches were held between the bottom two clubs in Division One and the top two clubs in Division Two. Thames Ironworks retained their place in Division One after beating Fulham 5–1, whilst Watford were promoted after beating Sheppey United 2–1, a result which saw the latter relegated.

Division One clubs	v	Division Two clubs

30 April 1900

Thames Ironworks	5–1	Fulham

White Hart Lane

Sheppey United	1–2	Watford
