= 1901–02 Southampton F.C. season =

English football club season

Southampton F.C.
1901–02 season
- Chairman: Dr. Ernest Stancomb
- Secretary: Er Arnfield
- Stadium: The Dell
- Southern League: Third
- FA Cup: Runners-up
- Top goalscorer: League: Albert Brown (25); All: Albert Brown (29)
- Highest home attendance: 20,000 vs Liverpool (8 February 1901) (FA Cup)
Home colours

The 1901–02 season was the 17th since the foundation of Southampton F.C. and their eighth in league football, as members of the Southern League.

The club repeated their performance from two seasons earlier, again reaching the FA Cup Final, where they lost to the previous season's losing finalists, Sheffield United after a replay. In the League, they finished in third place behind local rivals Portsmouth and the FA Cup holders, Tottenham Hotspur.

== Personnel ==
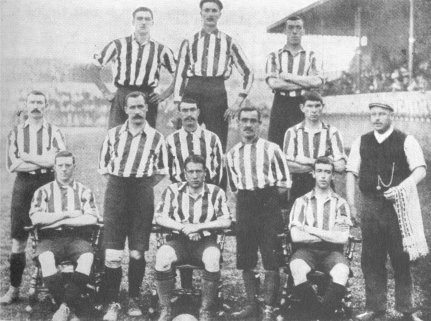
The Southampton team in "formation" before the match against Swindon Town on 19 October 1901. (Back row: C. B. Fry, H. Moger, G. Molyneux. Middle: S. Meston, H. Wood, T. Bowman, A. Chadwick, B. Lee, W. Dawson (trainer). Seated: J. Turner, A. Brown, F. Harrison.)

In the summer of 1901, the Football Association introduced a "maximum wage" for footballers of £4 per week; as a result, players such as Jack Robinson and Harry Wood were forced to take a pay cut. Whilst this measure was of little immediate effect on the club, it would make it harder to entice players away from the Football League. With debts of £1,500, Southampton needed to trim their payroll, with Arthur Chadwick joining neighbours Portsmouth, Alf Milward joining New Brompton and Wilf Toman returning to Everton, while Jimmy Yates dropped down into non-league football.

Replacements included Tommy Bowman and Albert Brown from Aston Villa, and Alex McDonald and Joe Turner from Everton. Despite scoring five goals in the first three matches, McDonald quickly dropped out of favour, and left to join West Ham United in December before finishing the season at Portsmouth.

The club still had the services of top amateur players, with C. B. Fry continuing to play when he could, especially in FA Cup ties, and his friend, Geoffrey Plumpton Wilson making three appearances at centre-forward in October.

The team was still under the control of secretary Ernest Arnfield, with Bill Dawson continuing as trainer.

== League season ==
Bristol City's application to join the Football League Second Division had been accepted, while Gravesend United had dropped down to the Kent League and Chatham Town had resigned from the league after ten matches of the 1900–01 season. Their places in a 16-team Southern Football League First Division had been taken by Brentford (promoted from Division Two), Northampton Town and Wellingborough Town (both from the Midland League).

The season opened with a 1–1 draw against New Brompton followed by two victories, including a 5–0 win over Watford in which Alex McDonald scored four goals. The match at Portsmouth's Fratton Park on 12 October ended in a 2–2 draw, in which the Saints "were fortunate in escaping defeat" when Albert Brown scored a late penalty after Pompey's player-manager Bob Blyth had handled the ball. C. B. Fry was making his first appearance of the season and was hit in the head by goalkeeper Jack Robinson, who was trying to punch the ball away. Fry took some time to recover and mistimed a challenge, allowing Bobby Marshall through to equalise Fred Harrison's opening goal.

After two further home victories, Southampton again met Portsmouth, this time at The Dell on 2 November. By this time, Southampton were fifth in the table, two points and two places behind their neighbours, but with two games in hand. A crowd of 12,000 (described as a "dense mass of humanity") descended on The Dell on a "brilliantly fine and crisp" afternoon. Portsmouth's long-term goalkeeper, the Ireland international, Matt Reilly was injured, with his place being taken by the inexperienced Darling. Portsmouth raced into a two-goal lead, with goals from Frank Bedingfield and Steve Smith before the Saints started to put Darling under pressure. Saints equalised through a penalty scored by Edgar Chadwick and a goal from Joe Turner, but Portsmouth's goalkeeper demonstrated "superb coolness" to prevent Saints going ahead before Bedingfield added a third goal. Saints again equalised through Chadwick, who "beat Darling all ends up", resulting in a "ding dong struggle" of end to end football, before Dan Cunliffe scored the final goal for the visitors, who held firm for "a meritorious win".

After the defeat to Portsmouth, there followed a run of five victories without conceding a goal, before a draw and defeat (3–0 at New Brompton) in mid-December. For the fourth consecutive season, the Boxing Day match was at home to Tottenham Hotspur (won 1–0).

In the match at Luton Town on 9 November, Fry's behaviour led to serious crowd problems. After committing several fouls, he nearly conceded a penalty near the end of the game. The Luton News & Bedfordshire Chronicle reported that "Fry ... had been for some time losing his head, and the spectators soon lost their tempers." "This distinguished amateur, who has a reputation second to no man's, displayed anything but a sportsmanlike spirit." The Southampton-based Football Echo took the view that Fry had been repeatedly tripped by the Luton defender Robert Colvin and Fry's actions were out of frustration. By the end of the match, "missiles were hurled at the famous athlete ...[and] for a few minutes matters had an ugly appearance". The Luton directors apologised to Fry after the match, who replied that this was unnecessary as the supporters' behaviour was outside the directors' control. "I am quite sure they [the directors] were even more upset than anyone else at the annoyance to which I was subjected".

The final match of 1901 was the first visit of newly promoted Northampton Town to The Dell. The match, which was played on a "slippery" pitch, attracted a "very small" crowd to see the return of Jack Farrell (who had been at the centre of the dispute over the players' poor performance in the 1900 FA Cup Final). The fans who stayed away missed a match in which several records were set, which still stand over 100 years later. Albert Brown kicked off with a pass to the wings and immediately ran into the Northampton goal where he received a return pass that he shot into the net past Northampton's goalkeeper, Fred Cook. Although the goal was not timed, this is believed to be the fastest goal scored by a Southampton player from the kick-off. Within five minutes, Brown had scored a hat trick before Archie Turner added a fourth goal with an "excellently timed" shot from the right. The Northampton defenders were floundering in the mud, with one turning a long shot from Samuel Meston into his own net before Brown ran through the defence to add a sixth goal. The seventh goal came from Fred Harrison following up after his original shot had been only partially cleared. Before half-time, efforts from Harrison and Edgar Chadwick were disallowed for offside, leaving a half-time score of 7–0.

In the second half, the Saints eased off slightly while Northampton's play improved. Despite this, Meston added his second goal soon after the restart when his shot went between the legs of the hapless goalkeeper. Brown's fifth goal was hit with such force that the ball became wedged between the railings behind the goal, causing a delay before the match could restart. Brown's sixth goal came soon afterwards with a "dinking oblique kick" to confuse Cook, bringing the total to nine. By this time, the Saints fans were not taking the game very seriously and there was a carnival atmosphere on the terraces, helped by a cornet player in the stands. Northampton fought back with a rare shot on goal when centre-half Murrell just missed with a low shot that had got past a cold and wet Jack Robinson in the Saints' goal. Brown added two further goals in the dying minutes of the match, with his seventh and final goal one of the best after he took the ball off Murrell, before beating full-backs Edward "Old Hookie" Turner and Jack Bennett and blasting the ball past Cook.

The final score was 11–0 to Southampton, which is the club's record result in a League match (although this was to be equalled a year later against Watford). Brown's tally of seven goals in one match is the highest scored by a Southampton player in a competitive match, although Alf Whittingham scored eight in a wartime match in 1945 against Luton Town. Speaking about this match in 1924, trainer Bill Dawson claimed that his players had "a little secret" that enabled them to keep their feet on the heavy ground.

Southampton began 1902 with two further victories before the start of their run in the FA Cup. Having only failed to win only five of the eighteen matches played by the end of January, the remaining twelve games produced just five more wins with four defeats and three draws, leaving the Saints in third place, five points behind local rivals, Portsmouth, who won the Southern League title for the first time.

Despite a slow start to the season and missing several matches through injury, Albert Brown was easily the top scorer for the season with 25 goals from his 25 league appearances.

== League results ==
Date	Opponents	H / A	Result F – A	Scorers
7 September 1901	New Brompton	H	1–1	A. Turner
14 September 1901	Northampton Town	A	2–1	Chadwick, McDonald
21 September 1901	Watford	H	5–0	McDonald (4), J. Turner
12 October 1901	Portsmouth	A	2–2	Brown, Harrison
19 October 1901	Swindon Town	H	6–1	Wood (2), Chadwick, Harrison, Meston, A. Turner
26 October 1901	Brentford	H	1–0	J. Turner
2 November 1901	Portsmouth	H	3–4	Chadwick (2), J. Turner
9 November 1901	Luton Town	A	2–0	Brown, Meston
16 November 1901	Millwall Athletic	H	3–0	Brown (2), J. Turner
23 November 1901	Queens Park Rangers	A	1–0	Brown
30 November 1901	Reading	H	2–0	J. Turner, Wood
12 December 1901	West Ham United	H	4–0	J. Turner, Brown, Wood
14 December 1901	Brentford	A	1–1	Brown
21 December 1901	New Brompton	A	0–3	
26 December 1901	Tottenham Hotspur	H	1–0	Wood
28 December 1901	Northampton Town	H	11–0	Brown (7), Meston (2), Harrison, A. Turner
4 January 1902	Watford	A	2–1	Brown, Wood
18 January 1902	Wellingborough Town	H	3–0	A. Turner (2), Brown
1 February 1902	Swindon Town	A	0–0	
15 February 1902	Kettering Town	H	3–1	A. Turner (2), Wood
1 March 1902	Millwall Athletic	A	1–1	Brown
5 March 1902	Bristol Rovers	A	0–1	
8 March 1902	Queens Park Rangers	H	4–2	Brown (2), Harrison, A. Turner
19 March 1902	Reading	A	0–2	
22 March 1902	West Ham United	A	1–2	Brown
28 March 1902	Tottenham Hotspur	A	2–2	A. Turner, J. Turner
29 March 1902	Bristol Rovers	H	6–0	Brown (3), Cavendish, Harrison, J. Turner
2 April 1902	Kettering Town	A	1–2	Wood
5 April 1902	Wellingborough Town	A	2–1	Brown, Wood
9 April 1902	Luton Town	H	1–0	Brown

=== Legend ===
Win	Draw	Loss

=== Top of league table ===
Pos	Team	Pld	W	D	L	GF	GA	GR	Pts
1	Portsmouth	30	20	7	3	67	24	2.792	47
2	Tottenham Hotspur	30	18	6	6	61	22	2.773	42
3	Southampton	30	18	6	6	71	28	2.536	42
4	West Ham United	30	17	6	7	45	28	1.607	40
5	Reading	30	16	7	7	57	24	2.375	39

Source: rsssf.com
Rules for classification: The system of using goal average to separate two teams tied on points was used until the 1976-77 season. The points system: 2 points for a win, 1 point for a draw and 0 points for losing.

== FA Cup ==
In the first round of the FA Cup, Southampton were drawn against the cup-holders, Tottenham Hotspur. The first match was played at White Hart Lane on 25 January 1902 in front of a crowd of 20,000; by half-time the teams were level through goals from David Copeland for Spurs and Tommy Bowman for the Saints. In the second half, Southampton looked more likely to score but they were unable to breach "the home citadel". Spurs mounted a late rally that resulted in end to end football, but the score remained 1–1 after 90 minutes.

The replay took place the following Wednesday at The Dell with an attendance of 10,000 including a large contingent of Spurs fans. Spurs took the lead through Ted Hughes before Edgar Chadwick equalised; another goal from Hughes was matched by one from Joe Turner and after normal time the match was level at 2–2. With extra time only being played by agreement between the teams, the referee Arthur Kingscott consulted the captains who agreed to play on "in an attempt to achieve a definite result". During the extra time, no further goals were scored but several Southampton players were injured; Albert Brown required lengthy treatment after colliding with Hughes and then Bowman suffered severe cramp and as a result Joe Turner had to drop back to cover for him at centre-half. The worst injury was to Bert Lee, who was kicked on the head and was forced to miss the replay.

The second replay took place at Reading's Elm Park ground on Monday 3 February, in front of a crowd of only 6,000. The pitch was described as "like a skating rink" covered in snow, with the touchlines painted blue; the match kicked off with snow still falling. Lee's place at left-half was taken by Bert Paddington, making a rare first-team appearance. In the first half, Paddington struggled against the pace of the Spurs' forwards, including John Cameron and Sandy Brown but, with the assistance of George Molyneux, survived a goalless first-half. After the interval, C. B. Fry was beaten by Patrick Gilhooley who crossed the ball to Jack Kirwan for a simple tap-in. Saints responded quickly, equalising when Archie Turner "screwed in a tricky shot". For the remainder of the match, Southampton were stronger, spending most of the time in the Spurs half of the pitch. The Spurs goalkeeper, Fred Griffiths, made a "wonderful" save from Chadwick before Sandy Tait turned the ball against his own post. In the final few minutes of the match, Saints managed to take the lead when Tait made a poor backpass, which was seized on by Albert Brown who beat Griffiths, leading to scenes of "indescribable enthusiasm" amongst the Southampton fans.

Waiting for Southampton in the second round was a home tie against Liverpool, who had won the Football League First Division title the previous year. To prepare for the match against the champions, trainer Bill Dawson took the players to the Clump Inn at Chilworth where the players had the use of a field behind the inn. The match was played at The Dell only five days after the second replay against Spurs. Writing in 1924, Dawson said that the players ran out onto the pitch "like a lot of kittens, full of life" and that the match was "the finest exhibition of football put up by the Saints". Goals from Archie Turner (2), Joe Turner and the fit again Bert Lee saw off the League champions, who could only manage one goal in response, from George Fleming.

The third-round match was away to Bury who had comprehensively defeated the Saints in the 1900 FA Cup Final. Described as a "real thriller", the match was all square at 2–2 with goals from Harry Wood and Joe Turner matching those from George Ross and Charlie Sagar for the home side. Injuries to the two Southampton goalscorers had reduced them to nine players and the team were defending "desperately" to hang on for a replay. After a spell of seven successive corners for Bury, Albert Brown broke up the pitch with most of the Bury players in the Saint's half. After sprinting the full length of the pitch, Brown unleashed a shot that hit the crossbar and rebounded over his head. Edgar Chadwick was following up and trapped the ball, feinted to go past the goalkeeper and "coolly slotted the ball in the other corner" to secure victory.

The semi-final gave the Saints the chance to gain revenge over Nottingham Forest who had defeated Southampton in the 1898 semi-final in controversial circumstances. After 90 minutes of the match, played at White Hart Lane, the sides were level through goals from Edgar Chadwick for Saints and John Calvey for Forest. In extra time, Albert Brown put the Saints ahead from the penalty spot and completed the victory in the final minute scoring "a wonderful goal with a screw shot from an oblique angle".

Southampton were now in the FA Cup Final for the second time in three years and for the third year in a row, a Southern League side had reached the final. Derby County and Sheffield United needed two replays to settle their semi-final and the Saints took advantage of this to send Harry Wood to the City Ground in Nottingham to "spy" on the two sides in the second replay, with Sheffield United winning through to their second consecutive final.

=== FA Cup Final ===
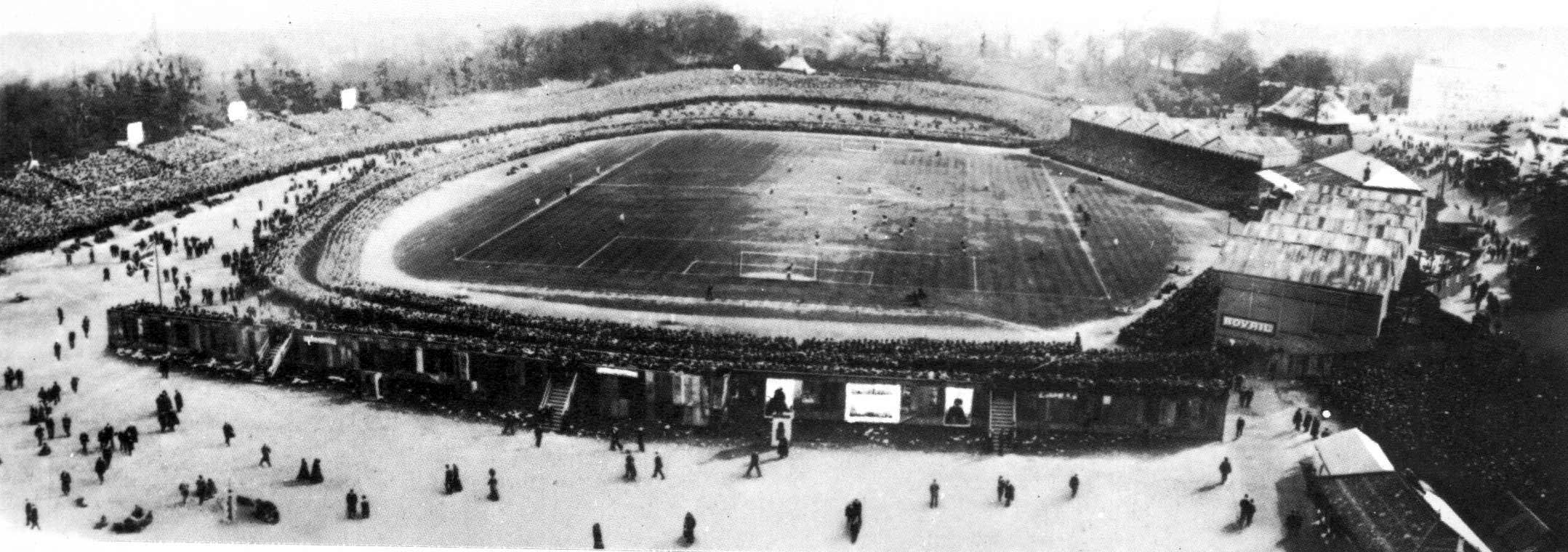
A panoramic view of the Crystal Palace ground during the 1905 FA Cup Final.

For the final, the players again went to the Clump Inn for extra training but goalkeeper Jack Robinson caught a chill and was only declared fit on the morning of the final, with the final decision made less than an hour before kick off. With doubts also about C. B. Fry's fitness, Harry Moger and Bill Henderson travelled to Crystal Palace as reserves. Fry's inclusion in the final line up made him the first amateur player to appear in an FA Cup Final since 1893.

Sheffield United had taken seven matches to reach the final, with a replay required to get past Newcastle United in Round 3 as well as the double replay in the semi-final. In the build up to the match, Ernie "Nudger" Needham, United's captain, had vowed to make amends for their defeat in the 1901 Final, declaring that his team "had let the north down".

==== First match ====
The first match was played at Crystal Palace on 19 April 1902 in front of a crowd of 76,914, with many fans trying to get a better view of the match by use of the surrounding trees, which "shook as though whipped by a gale, denoting the enthusiasm of adventurous individuals who were in their branches". As both teams normally played in red and white stripes, Saints won the right to wear their normal kit, while Sheffield United wore dark shorts and white shirts.

After a scoreless first half, Sheffield United opened the scoring early in the second half with a goal from Alf Common. United appeared to be on the way to victory when, with two minutes to play, Saints' captain Harry Wood equalised. Wood was in an offside position tying up his bootlaces when the ball reached him. After consultation between the referee and his linesman, the officials decided that the ball had struck a United defender thus playing Wood onside.

At the end of the game United's goalkeeper, William "Fatty" Foulke, protested to the officials that the equalising goal should not have been allowed. Foulke, who was reputed to weigh more than 20 stone, left his dressing room unclothed and angrily pursued the referee, Mr. T. Kirkham, who took refuge in a broom cupboard. Foulke had to be stopped by a group of F.A. officials from wrenching the cupboard door from its hinges to reach the hapless referee.

==== Replay ====
The replay took place a week later on 26 April 1902, again at Crystal Palace, in front of a crowd of 33,068, less than half the number who had watched the first match. As Southampton had worn red and white stripes in the first match, this time they swapped to white shirts with United in their normal stripes.

The weather for the replay was bitterly cold, and two minutes into the game, Saints' goalkeeper Jack Robinson slipped to allow George Hedley to score. Saints pressed for an equaliser and Foulke was kept busy throughout the rest of the first half. The pressure continued after half-time and Albert Brown equalised on the 70th minute with a "magic" shot from distance following a pass from Joe Turner.

After drawing level Saints continued on the attack and Foulke was required to make saves from Chadwick, Wood and Lee. It looked as though the match was going into extra-time, when, with ten minutes remaining, Robinson failed to cut out a cross and Billy Barnes only had to "walk" the ball in to the unguarded net to score the winner for United, although Fry blasted a chance high over the crossbar in the final minute.

=== FA Cup results ===
Date	Round	Opponents	H / A	Result F – A	Scorers	Attendance
25 January 1902	Round 1	Tottenham Hotspur	A	1–1	Bowman	20,000
29 January 1902	Round 1 replay	Tottenham Hotspur	H	2–2	Chadwick, J. Turner	10,000
3 February 1902	Round 1 second replay	Tottenham Hotspur	N	2–1	A. Turner, Brown	6,000
8 February 1902	Round 2	Liverpool	H	4–1	A. Turner (2), J. Turner, Lee	20,000
22 February 1902	Round 3	Bury	A	3–2	Wood, Chadwick, J. Turner	25,000
15 March 1902	Semi-final	Nottingham Forest	N	3–1	Brown (2), Chadwick	30,000
19 April 1902	Final	Sheffield United	N	1–1	Wood	74,479
26 April 1902	Final replay	Sheffield United	N	1–2	Brown	33,068

== Friendly matches ==
Only three friendly matches are recorded for the 1901–02 season, with two matches against opposition from The Football League, a 1–0 victory at Woolwich Arsenal on 19 November and a 4–1 home defeat to Aston Villa.

On 5 October 1901, Southampton visited Queen's Club to play the Corinthian amateur side who included C. B. Fry at right-back. A mistake by Fry allowed Albert Brown to score the only goal.

== Player statistics ==
Position	Nationality	Name	League apps	League goals	FA Cup apps	FA Cup goals	Total apps	Total goals
HB	Scotland	Tommy Bowman	27	0	8	1	35	1
FW	England	Albert Brown	25	25	8	4	33	29
FW	England	Sid Cavendish	5	1	0	0	5	1
FW	England	Edgar Chadwick	25	4	8	3	33	7
FB	England	C. B. Fry	9	0	8	0	17	0
FW	England	W. George^{a}	1	0	0	0	1	0
FW	England	Fred Harrison	15	5	0	0	15	5
FB	Scotland	Bill Henderson	21	0	0	0	21	0
FB	England	Claude Howland^{b}	1	0	0	0	1	0
HB	England	Bert Lee	27	0	7	1	34	1
FW	Scotland	Alex McDonald	5	5	0	0	5	5
HB	Scotland	Samuel Meston	26	4	8	0	34	4
GK	England	Harry Moger	3	0	0	0	3	0
FB	England	George Molyneux	27	0	8	0	35	0
FW	England	George Northey^{c}	1	0	0	0	1	0
HB	England	Bert Paddington	7	0	1	0	8	0
GK	England	Jack Robinson	26	0	8	0	34	0
FW	England	Henry Small	4	0	0	0	4	0
HB	England	Victor Smith	2	0	0	0	2	0
FW	England	Henry Smoker	0	0	0	0	0	0
FB	England	Walter Triggs	2	0	0	0	2	0
FW	England	Archie Turner	25	9	8	3	33	12
FW	England	Joe Turner	20	9	8	3	28	12
HB	England	William Whiting	1	0	0	0	1	0
FW	England	G. P. Wilson	3	0	0	0	3	0
FW	England	Harry Wood	22	9	8	2	30	11

=== Key ===
- GK – Goalkeeper
- FB – Full-back
- HB – Half-back
- FW – Forward

== Transfers ==
=== In ===
Date	Position	Name	From
May 1901	HB	Tommy Bowman	Aston Villa
May 1901	FW	Albert Brown	Aston Villa
Summer 1901	FB	Bill Henderson	Reading
May 1901	FW	Alex McDonald	Everton
Summer 1901	FW	Joe Turner	Everton
1901	HB	William Whiting	Local football
October 1901	FW	G. P. Wilson	Corinthian^{d}

=== Departures ===
Date	Position	Name	To
Summer 1901	FB	Arthur Blackburn	Blackburn Rovers
May 1901	HB	Arthur Chadwick	Portsmouth
Summer 1901	HB	Joe French	New Brompton
Summer 1901	HB	Ted Killean	New Brompton
December 1901	FW	Alex McDonald	West Ham United
Summer 1901	FW	Alf Milward	New Brompton
May 1901	FB	Bertram Sharp	Everton
Summer 1901	FW	Wilf Toman	Everton
May 1900	FW	Jimmy Yates	Hastings & St Leonards

== Notes ==
- ^a W. George joined Southampton from Bitterne Guild. Described as a "sturdily-built right-winger", he only made one Southern League appearance, at Reading on 19 March 1902 and one Western League appearance for the club.
- ^b Claude Howland (1880–1965) was born in Fulham and had an unsuccessful trial appearance at Bristol Rovers on 5 March 1902.
- ^c George Northey (b. Launceston, Cornwall, 1883) was given a trial on the right-wing in the final match of the season at home to Luton Town on 9 April 1902. Although he showed some "neat touches", he was not offered a contract for the following season.
- ^d G. P. Wilson was an amateur and continued to play for Corinthian as well as for Southampton.

== Bibliography ==
- Bull, David; Brunskell, Bob (2000). Match of the Millennium. Hagiology Publishing. ISBN 0-9534474-1-3.
- Cavallini, Rob (2007). Play Up Corinth – A History of the Corinthian Football Club. Tempus Publishing. ISBN 0-7524-4479-4.
- Chalk, Gary; Holley, Duncan (1987). Saints – A complete record. Breedon Books. ISBN 0-907969-22-4.
- Collett, Mike (2003). The Complete Record of the FA Cup. Sports Books. ISBN 1-899807-19-5.
- Holley, Duncan (2012). Suited and Booted. Bristol: Hagiology Publishing. ISBN 0-9534474-9-9.
- Holley, Duncan; Chalk, Gary (1992). The Alphabet of the Saints. ACL & Polar Publishing. ISBN 0-9514862-3-3.
- Juson, Dave (2004). Saints v Pompey – A history of unrelenting rivalry. Hagiology Publishing. ISBN 0-9534474-5-6.
- Lloyd, Guy; Holt, Nick (2005). The F.A. Cup – The Complete Story. Aurum Press. ISBN 1-84513-054-5.
- Wilton, Iain (2000). C.B. Fry: An English Hero. Metro Books. ISBN 978-1-86066-180-8.
