= Bill Henderson (footballer, born 1878) =

Scottish footballer

Personal information
- Full name: William Henderson
- Date of birth: 1878
- Place of birth: Broxburn, West Lothian, Scotland
- Date of death: 1945 (aged 66–67)
- Height: 5 ft 8 in (1.73 m)
- Position: Right-back

Senior career*
Years	Team	Apps	(Gls)
????–1896	Broxburn Athletic		
1896–1897	Everton	0	(0)
1897–1901	Reading		
1901–1902	Southampton	21	(0)
1902–1904	Everton	15	(0)
1904–1906	Reading		
1906–1908	Clapton Orient	47	(0)
1908–????	New Brompton		
- * Club domestic league appearances and goals

William Henderson (1878–1945) was a Scottish footballer who played as a full-back for various clubs in England at the turn of the 20th century.

== Football career ==
=== Early career ===
Henderson was born in Broxburn, West Lothian and started his career with the local team, Broxburn Athletic, before signing for English First Division club, Everton in November 1896.

Unable to break into the Everton first-team, the following summer Henderson moved south to join Reading in the Southern League where he spent the next four years.

=== Southampton ===
In the summer of 1901, he moved to the south coast, to join Southern League champions, Southampton. Described as "a capable defender (who) tackled strongly and was quick to the ball" his major weakness was his "over-zealousness".

He made his debut for the "Saints" playing at right-back in the opening match of the 1901–02 season, a 1–1 draw with New Brompton at The Dell. Unfortunately for Henderson, his time with the Saints coincided with that of C. B. Fry, the famous amateur right-back – as a consequence, Henderson was required to stand down whenever Fry was available to play. Although Henderson made 21 league appearances (including one at right-half) whereas Fry only played nine league matches, Fry was selected for all the club's matches in the FA Cup in which they made it all the way through to the Final where they lost 2–1 to Sheffield United after a replay.

Frustrated by the lack of regular first-team football, Henderson decided to return to Everton in the 1902 close season.

=== Everton ===
Henderson made his Everton debut on 13 September 1902, replacing William Balmer in a 1–0 defeat to Newcastle United. Henderson went on to make 13 appearances in the 1902–03 season and two the following year, before returning to Reading in the summer of 1904.

=== Later career ===
Henderson remained at Reading for two years, before returning to the Football League to join Clapton Orient in the Second Division in August 1906. In his two seasons with Clapton Orient, he became the regular choice at right-back, replacing the veteran Billy Holmes.

In 1908, Henderson moved back to the Southern League with New Brompton, where he finished his career. He joined the club at the same time as another player also called William Henderson, and the two played alongside each other on six occasions.
