= Harry Allen =

Harry Allen may refer to:

== Science ==
- Sir Harry Brookes Allen (1854–1926), Australian pathologist
- Harry W. Allen (1892–1981), American entomologist
- Harry Julian Allen (1910–1977), NASA engineer and administrator

== Sports ==
- Harry Allen (footballer, born 1866) (1866–1895), Wolverhampton Wanderers and England footballer
- Harry Allen (footballer, born 1879) (1879–1939), English footballer for Derby County and Leicester Fosse
- Harry Allen (Australian footballer) (1890–1978), Australian rules footballer
- Harry Allen (cricketer) (born 1996), English cricketer
- Harry Allen (golfer) (1876–1924), American golfer
- Harry Allen (ice hockey) (1923–1990), Canadian ice hockey player
- Harry Allen (tennis), 1903 US Open mixed doubles champion
- Harry Allen (bowls), Canadian lawn bowls international
- Harry Allen (equestrian), Irish show jumping rider

== Other ==
- Harry Allen (Ontario politician) (1889–1963), provincial politician in Ontario, Canada
- Harry Allen (journalist) (born 1963), hip-hop journalist, activist, and associate of Public Enemy
- Harry Allen (musician) (born 1966), jazz tenor saxophonist
- Harry Cranbrook Allen (1917–1998), British historian
- Harry Epworth Allen (1894–1958), British painter
- Harry Allen (actor) (1883–1951), Australian actor in California Straight Ahead!
- Harry Allen (executioner) (1911–1992), hangman, one of the last British executioners
- Harry Allen (designer) (born 1964), American industrial and interior designer
- Harry Allen (trans man) (1882–1922), pioneer period Pacific Northwest transgender man
- Harry K. Allen (1872–1959), Kansas State Senator, Dean of Washburn University School of Law and a Justice of the Kansas Supreme Court

== See also ==
- Allen (surname)
- Harrison Allen (1841–1897), American physician and anatomist
- Harold Allen (disambiguation)
- Harry Allan (disambiguation)
- Henry Allan (disambiguation)
- Henry Allen (disambiguation)
