= Henry Allen =

Henry Allen may refer to:

== Politics ==
- Henry Allen Jr. (1823/24–1856), American politician, member of the Mississippi State Senate
- Henry Allen (Wisconsin politician), Wisconsin state assemblyman
- Henry C. Allen (1844–1925), American politician and farmer from Virginia
- Henry C. Allen (Virginia politician) (1838–1889)
- Henry C. Allen (New Jersey politician) (1872–1942), American Republican Party politician in New Jersey
- Henry D. Allen (1854–1924), U.S. representative from Kentucky
- Henry Edgarton Allen (1864–1924), Canadian politician and merchant
- Henry J. Allen (1868–1950), governor of Kansas
- Henry Allen (mayor of Gloucester) (1815–1893), mayor of Gloucester, England, 1873
- Henry George Allen (1815–1908), British member of parliament for Pembroke, 1880–1885, and Pembroke and Haverfordwest, 1885–1886
- Henry Watkins Allen (1820–1866), American soldier and politician

== Other ==
- Henry Allen (Colorado settler) (c. 1815–1871), American miner and leader of early Denver, Colorado
- Henry Allen (equestrian) (1889–1971), American Olympic equestrian
- Henry Allen (footballer) (1898–1976), English footballer
- Henry Allen (journalist) (born 1941), American journalist, poet, musician and critic
- Henry Wilson Allen (1912–1991), American author and screenwriter
- Henry Allen (theologian) (1748–1784), Christian hymnwriter
- Red Allen (Henry Allen, 1908–1967), jazz trumpeter
- Henry Robinson Allen (1809–1876), Irish-born London-based opera singer
- Henry Tureman Allen (1859–1930), Alaskan explorer and military leader
- Henry Kaleialoha Allen (1933–2022), Hawaiian steel guitarist and singer

== Characters ==
- Henry Allen (comics), a DC Comics character and the father of Barry Allen / Flash
  - Henry Allen (The Flash), a version of the character from the 2014 TV series, The Flash

== See also ==
- Henry Allan (disambiguation)
- Harry Allen (disambiguation)
- Alan Henry (1947–2016), Grand Prix reporter
- Alan Henry, editor at Lifehacker
