= 1901–02 FA Cup =

Tournament details
- Country: England

Final positions
- Champions: Sheffield United (2nd title)
- Runners-up: Southampton

The 1901–02 FA Cup was the 31st staging of the world's oldest association football competition, the Football Association Challenge Cup (more usually known as the FA Cup). Sheffield United won the competition for the second time, beating Southampton 2–1 in the replay of the final at Crystal Palace. The first match had finished 1–1.

Matches were scheduled to be played at the stadium of the team named first on the date specified for each round, which was always a Saturday. If scores were level after 90 minutes had been played, a replay would take place at the stadium of the second-named team later the same week. If the replayed match was drawn further replays would be held at neutral venues until a winner was determined. If scores were level after 90 minutes had been played in a replay, a 30-minute period of extra time would be played.

== Calendar ==
The format of the FA Cup for the season had a preliminary round, five qualifying rounds, an intermediate round, three proper rounds, and the semi-finals and final.

Round	Date
Preliminary round	Saturday 21 September 1901
First qualifying round	Saturday 5 October 1901
Second qualifying round	Saturday 19 October 1901
Third qualifying round	Saturday 2 November 1901
Fourth qualifying round	Saturday 16 November 1901
Fifth qualifying round	Saturday 30 November 1901
Intermediate Round	Saturday 14 December 1901
First round proper	Saturday 25 January 1902
Second round	Saturday 8 February 1902
Third round	Saturday 22 February 1902
Semifinals	Saturday 15 March 1902
Final	Saturday 19 April 1902

== Intermediate round ==
The Intermediate Round featured ten ties, played between the winners from the fifth qualifying round and ten teams exempt to this stage. First Division side Small Heath received a bye to this round, as did Chesterfield, Newton Heath, Woolwich Arsenal, Burnley and Leicester Fosse from the Second Division and Reading, Portsmouth and Millwall Athletic from the Southern League. New Brighton Tower had also been allocated an exemption to this round, but, after the club withdrew from the Football League and disbanded during the summer of 1901, the Football Association ruled that the team drawn to oppose them would be granted a walkover to the first round.

The remaining Second Division sides had to gain entry to this round through the qualifying rounds. Barnsley, Blackpool, Bristol City, Burton United, Burslem Port Vale, Doncaster Rovers, Gainsborough Trinity, Glossop, Lincoln City and Stockport County were all entered in the third qualifying round. Of these, Glossop and Lincoln City reached the Intermediate Round along with non-league sides Bishop Auckland, Darwen, Walsall, Northampton Town, Bristol Rovers, Oxford City, Luton Town and New Brompton. Bishop Auckland, Northampton Town and Oxford City qualified for the competition proper for the first time.

The nine matches were played on 14 December 1901. Two matches went to replays which were played during the following midweek. Oxford City was the recipient of the walkover caused by the withdrawal of New Brighton Tower.

Tie no	Home team	Score	Away team	Date
1	Reading	2–1	Chesterfield	14 December 1901
2	Walsall	2–0	New Brompton	14 December 1901
3	Newton Heath	1–2	Lincoln City	14 December 1901
4	Bishop Auckland	2–3	Burnley	14 December 1901
5	Millwall Athletic	1–1	Bristol Rovers	14 December 1901
Replay	Bristol Rovers	1–0	Millwall Athletic	18 December 1901
6	Leicester Fosse	0–1	Glossop	14 December 1901
7	Woolwich Arsenal	1–1	Luton Town	14 December 1901
Replay	Luton Town	0–2	Woolwich Arsenal	18 December 1901
8	Oxford City	Walkover	New Brighton Tower	N/A
9	Northampton Town	4–1	Darwen	14 December 1901
10	Portsmouth	2–1	Small Heath	14 December 1901

== First round proper ==
The first round proper contained sixteen ties between 32 teams. 17 of the 18 First Division sides were exempt to this round, as were West Bromwich Albion, Middlesbrough and Preston North End from the Second Division, and Southern League sides Southampton and Tottenham Hotspur, finalists in the two previous seasons. They joined the ten teams who won in the intermediate round.

The matches were played on Saturday 25 January 1902. Seven matches were drawn, with the replays taking place in the following midweek. Two of these then went to a second replay the following week.

Tie no	Home team	Score	Away team	Date
1	Bury	5–1	West Bromwich Albion	25 January 1902
2	Liverpool	2–2	Everton	25 January 1902
Replay	Everton	0–2	Liverpool	29 January 1902
3	Stoke	2–2	Aston Villa	25 January 1902
Replay	Aston Villa	1–2	Stoke	29 January 1902
4	Walsall	1–0	Burnley	25 January 1902
5	Notts County	1–2	Reading	25 January 1902
6	Blackburn Rovers	0–2	Derby County	1 February 1902
7	The Wednesday	0–1	Sunderland	25 January 1902
8	Grimsby Town	1–1	Portsmouth	25 January 1902
Replay	Portsmouth	2–0	Grimsby Town	29 January 1902
9	Wolverhampton Wanderers	0–2	Bolton Wanderers	25 January 1902
10	Middlesbrough	1–1	Bristol Rovers	25 January 1902
Replay	Bristol Rovers	1–0	Middlesbrough	29 January 1902
11	Woolwich Arsenal	0–2	Newcastle United	25 January 1902
12	Tottenham Hotspur	1–1	Southampton	25 January 1902
Replay	Southampton	2–2	Tottenham Hotspur	29 January 1902
2nd Replay	Southampton	2–1	Tottenham Hotspur	3 February 1902
13	Manchester City	1–1	Preston North End	25 January 1902
Replay	Preston North End	0–0	Manchester City	29 January 1902
2nd Replay	Preston North End	2–4	Manchester City	3 February 1902
14	Oxford City	0–0	Lincoln City	25 January 1902
Replay	Lincoln City	4–0	Oxford City	30 January 1902
15	Northampton Town	0–2	Sheffield United	25 January 1902
16	Glossop	1–3	Nottingham Forest	25 January 1902

== Second round proper ==
The eight second-round matches were scheduled for Saturday, 8 February 1902. There were no replays.

Tie no	Home team	Score	Away team	Date
1	Southampton	4–1	Liverpool	8 February 1902
2	Reading	0–1	Portsmouth	8 February 1902
3	Walsall	0–5	Bury	8 February 1902
4	Lincoln City	1–3	Derby County	8 February 1902
5	Sheffield United	2–1	Bolton Wanderers	8 February 1902
6	Newcastle United	1–0	Sunderland	12 February 1902
7	Manchester City	0–2	Nottingham Forest	8 February 1902
8	Bristol Rovers	0–1	Stoke	8 February 1902

== Third round proper ==
The four quarter final matches were scheduled for Saturday 22 February 1902. There were two replays, played in the following midweek.

Tie no	Home team	Score	Away team	Date
1	Bury	2–3	Southampton	22 February 1902
2	Nottingham Forest	2–0	Stoke	22 February 1902
3	Newcastle United	1–1	Sheffield United	22 February 1902
Replay	Sheffield United	2–1	Newcastle United	27 February 1902
4	Portsmouth	0–0	Derby County	22 February 1902
Replay	Derby County	6–3	Portsmouth	27 February 1902

== Semifinals ==
The semi-final matches were played on Saturday 15 March 1902. Sheffield United and Derby County drew their tie and had to replay it; this next match also finished in a draw, and so a second replay was played a week later. Sheffield United eventually won and went on to meet Southampton in the final.

15 March 1902
15:00

Southampton	3–1	Nottingham Forest

White Hart Lane, London

15 March 1902
15:00

Sheffield United	1–1	Derby County

The Hawthorns, West Bromwich

Replay

20 March 1902
15:00

Sheffield United	1–1	Derby County

Molineux Stadium, Wolverhampton

Second Replay

27 March 1902
15:00

Sheffield United	1–0	Derby County

City Ground, Nottingham

== Final ==
The final was contested by Sheffield United and Southampton at Crystal Palace. The match finished 1–1 after extra time, with the goals scored by Alf Common for Sheffield United and Harry Wood for Southampton.

In the replay, which also took place at Crystal Palace, Sheffield United won 2–1, with goals from George Hedley and Billy Barnes. Albert Brown scored Southampton's goal.

=== Match details ===
19 April 1902
15:30 GMT

Sheffield United	1 – 1	Southampton
Common 55'		Wood 88'

Crystal Palace, London
Attendance: 76,914
Referee: T. Kirkham, Burslem

Sheffield United	Southampton

=== Replay ===
26 April 1902
15:00 GMT

Sheffield United	2 – 1	Southampton
Hedley 2'; Barnes 79'		Brown 70'

Crystal Palace, London
Attendance: 33,068
Referee: T. Kirkham, Burslem

== See also ==
- FA Cup final results 1872–
