= Harry Allan (disambiguation) =

Harry Allan (1882–1957) was a New Zealand teacher, botanist, scientific administrator and writer.

Harry Allan may also refer to:

- Harry Allan (rugby union) (born 1997), New Zealand rugby union player
- Harry Allan (footballer) (fl. 1898–1900), Scottish footballer

== See also ==
- Harry Allen (disambiguation)
- Henry Allan (disambiguation)
- Henry Allen (disambiguation)
- Harold Allen (disambiguation)
