= Harold Allen =

Harold Allen may refer to:

- Harold Allan (1895–1953), Jamaican statesman and first Afro-Jamaican to be knighted by the British Crown
- Hank Allen (born 1940), American baseball outfielder
- Harold Allen (cricketer, born 1886) (1886–1939), Australian cricketer who played for Tasmania
- Harold Allen (cricketer, born 1940) (born 1940), Australian cricketer who played for Tasmania
- Harold Allen, founder of Allen Press

== See also ==
- Harry Allan (disambiguation)
- Harry Allen (disambiguation)
- Henry Allan (disambiguation)
- Henry Allen (disambiguation)
