= 1894–95 in English football =

Football in England
- Season: 1894–95

Men's football
- First Division: Sunderland
- Second Division: Bury
- Northern League: Middlesbrough
- Midland League: Loughborough
- Southern League: Millwall Athletic
- FA Cup: Aston Villa
- FA Amateur Cup: Middlesbrough

The 1894–95 season was the 24th season of competitive football in England.

== League competitions ==
=== Football League ===
Following the collapse of Middlesbrough Ironopolis and the resignation of Northwich Victoria, three new teams were admitted to the Second Division, bringing it to 16 teams. These new teams were Bury, Leicester Fosse and Burton Wanderers.

=== Southern League ===
The Southern League, a competition for both professional and amateur clubs, was founded in 1894 under the initiative of Millwall Athletic (now simply Millwall), to cater for teams in southern England, who were unable to join the Football League. The nine founder members were:

- Chatham
- Clapton
- Ilford
- Luton Town
- Millwall Athletic
- Reading
- Royal Ordnance Factories
- 2nd Scots Guards (later withdrew and were replaced by Southampton St Mary's)
- Swindon Town

== Events ==
- 1 September 1894 – On the opening day of the Football League season, an extraordinary game between Sunderland and Derby County was played over three halves. The referee appointed for the match, Tom Kirkham, was running late so John Conqueror took charge. When Kirkham arrived, Sunderland were 3–0 ahead after the first half but the decision was made to start the match again at 0–0, annulling what was played so far. The decision did not bother Sunderland in the end, as they officially ran out 8–0 winners.
- 13 October 1894 – The Merseyside derby is contested for the first time. 44,000 watch Everton beat Liverpool 3–0 in a league clash at Goodison Park.

== Honours ==
Competition	Winner
First Division	Sunderland (3*)
Second Division	Bury
FA Cup	Aston Villa (2)
Home Championship	England

Notes = Number in parentheses is the times that club has won that honour. * indicates new record for competition

== League tables ==
=== First Division ===
Pos	Team	Pld	W	D	L	GF	GA	GAv	Pts	Relegation
1	Sunderland (C)	30	21	5	4	80	37	2.162	47	
2	Everton	30	18	6	6	82	50	1.640	42	
3	Aston Villa	30	17	5	8	82	43	1.907	39	
4	Preston North End	30	15	5	10	62	46	1.348	35	
5	Blackburn Rovers	30	11	10	9	59	49	1.204	32	
6	Sheffield United	30	14	4	12	57	55	1.036	32	
7	Nottingham Forest	30	13	5	12	50	56	0.893	31	
8	The Wednesday	30	12	4	14	50	55	0.909	28	
9	Burnley	30	11	4	15	44	56	0.786	26	
10	Bolton Wanderers	30	9	7	14	61	62	0.984	25	
11	Wolverhampton Wanderers	30	9	7	14	43	63	0.683	25	
12	Small Heath	30	9	7	14	50	74	0.676	25	
13	West Bromwich Albion	30	10	4	16	51	66	0.773	24	
14	Stoke (O)	30	9	6	15	50	67	0.746	24	Qualification for test matches
15	Derby County (O)	30	7	9	14	45	68	0.662	23	Qualification for test matches
16	Liverpool (R)	30	7	8	15	51	70	0.729	22	Qualification for test matches

Source: World Football
Rules for classification: 1) Points; 2) Goal average; 3) Goals scored
(C) Champions; (O) Play-off winners; (R) Relegated

=== Second Division ===
Pos	Team	Pld	W	D	L	GF	GA	GAv	Pts	Qualification or relegation
1	Bury (C, O, P)	30	23	2	5	78	33	2.364	48	Qualification for test matches
2	Notts County	30	17	5	8	75	45	1.667	39	Qualification for test matches
3	Newton Heath	30	15	8	7	78	44	1.773	38	Qualification for test matches
4	Leicester Fosse	30	15	8	7	72	53	1.358	38	
5	Grimsby Town	30	18	1	11	79	52	1.519	37	
6	Darwen	30	16	4	10	74	43	1.721	36	
7	Burton Wanderers	30	14	7	9	67	39	1.718	35	
8	Woolwich Arsenal	30	14	6	10	75	58	1.293	34	
9	Manchester City	30	14	3	13	82	72	1.139	31	
10	Newcastle United	30	12	3	15	72	84	0.857	27	
11	Burton Swifts	30	11	3	16	52	74	0.703	25	
12	Rotherham Town	30	11	2	17	55	62	0.887	24	
13	Lincoln City	30	10	0	20	52	92	0.565	20	Re-elected
14	Walsall Town Swifts (R)	30	10	0	20	47	92	0.511	20	Resigned from league
15	Burslem Port Vale	30	7	4	19	39	77	0.506	18	Re-elected
16	Crewe Alexandra	30	3	4	23	26	103	0.252	10	Re-elected

Rules for classification: 1) Points; 2) Goal average; 3) Goals scored
(C) Champions; (O) Play-off winners; (P) Promoted; (R) Relegated
