= 1894–95 Football League =

7th season of the Football League

The Football League
- Season: 1894–95
- Champions: Sunderland
- Relegated: Walsall Town Swifts
- New clubs in League: Bury, Burton Wanderers, Leicester Fosse

The 1894–95 season was the seventh season of The Football League.

During the first five seasons of the league the re-election process had concerned the clubs which finished in the bottom four of the league, but as of the 1894–95 season the re-election requirement was reduced to the last three clubs in Division Two.

However, as Lincoln City (fourth from last) and Walsall Town Swifts (third from last) both finished with 20 points, they were both subjected to the re-election process, and Walsall eventually resigned from the league. After this, and until the 1976–77 season, goal average (explained below) was used to determine a club's exact position and there were no more anomalies in the re-election processes.

Goal average was calculated by dividing the goals scored with goals conceded, and would more appropriately be called goal ratio. In case one or more teams had the same goal difference, this system favoured those teams who had scored fewer goals. The goal average system was eventually scrapped beginning with the 1976–77 season.

== First Division ==
First Division
- Season: 1894–95
- Champions: Sunderland; 3rd title
- Relegated: Liverpool
- Matches: 240
- Goals: 917 (3.82 per match)
- Top goalscorer: John Campbell (22 goals)
- Biggest home win: Sunderland 8–0 Derby County (1 September 1894); Blackburn Rovers 9–1 Small Heath (5 January 1895)
- Biggest away win: Wolverhampton Wanderers 0–4 Aston Villa (22 December 1894)
- Highest scoring: Blackburn Rovers 9–1 Small Heath (5 January 1895)
- Longest winning run: 8 matches Everton
- Longest unbeaten run: 10 matches Sunderland
- Longest losing run: 7 matches Burnley
- Highest attendance: 35,000; Everton 2–2 Sunderland (27 October 1894)
- Lowest attendance: 1,000; Small Heath 4–4 Preston North End (29 September 1894); Stoke 2–2 Small Heath (27 October 1894); Blackburn Rovers 3–0 West Bromwich Albion (22 December 1894); Derby County 1–1 Stoke (19 January 1895); Stoke 2–5 Sunderland (26 January 1895)
- Average attendance: 7,431

Pos	Team	Pld	W	D	L	GF	GA	GAv	Pts	Relegation
1	Sunderland (C)	30	21	5	4	80	37	2.162	47	
2	Everton	30	18	6	6	82	50	1.640	42	
3	Aston Villa	30	17	5	8	82	43	1.907	39	
4	Preston North End	30	15	5	10	62	46	1.348	35	
5	Blackburn Rovers	30	11	10	9	59	49	1.204	32	
6	Sheffield United	30	14	4	12	57	55	1.036	32	
7	Nottingham Forest	30	13	5	12	50	56	0.893	31	
8	The Wednesday	30	12	4	14	50	55	0.909	28	
9	Burnley	30	11	4	15	44	56	0.786	26	
10	Bolton Wanderers	30	9	7	14	61	62	0.984	25	
11	Wolverhampton Wanderers	30	9	7	14	43	63	0.683	25	
12	Small Heath	30	9	7	14	50	74	0.676	25	
13	West Bromwich Albion	30	10	4	16	51	66	0.773	24	
14	Stoke (O)	30	9	6	15	50	67	0.746	24	Qualification for test matches
15	Derby County (O)	30	7	9	14	45	68	0.662	23	Qualification for test matches
16	Liverpool (R)	30	7	8	15	51	70	0.729	22	Qualification for test matches

Source: World Football
Rules for classification: 1) Points; 2) Goal average; 3) Goals scored
(C) Champions; (O) Play-off winners; (R) Relegated

=== Results ===
Home \ Away	AST	BLB	BOL	BUR	DER	EVE	LIV	NOT	PNE	SHU	SMH	STK	SUN	WED	WBA	WOL
Aston Villa		3–0	2–1	5–0	4–0	2–2	5–0	4–1	4–1	5–0	2–1	6–0	1–2	3–1	3–1	2–2
Blackburn Rovers	1–3		2–1	1–0	0–0	4–3	1–1	0–0	1–1	3–2	9–1	6–0	1–1	3–1	3–0	5–1
Bolton Wanderers	4–3	1–3		1–1	6–0	1–3	1–0	4–1	1–2	6–2	1–2	2–2	4–1	2–2	5–0	6–1
Burnley	3–3	2–1	1–0		2–0	2–4	3–3	0–1	2–1	2–4	3–1	1–2	0–3	3–0	2–0	2–1
Derby County	0–2	0–0	2–2	0–2		2–2	0–1	4–2	2–1	4–1	4–1	1–1	1–2	1–2	1–1	1–3
Everton	4–2	2–1	3–1	3–2	2–3		3–0	6–1	4–2	1–1	5–0	3–0	2–2	3–1	4–1	2–1
Liverpool	1–2	2–2	1–2	0–3	5–1	2–2		5–0	2–5	2–2	3–1	2–0	2–3	4–2	4–0	3–3
Nottingham Forest	2–1	2–3	3–3	2–1	2–1	2–3	3–0		0–2	3–0	2–0	3–1	2–1	2–1	5–3	0–2
Preston North End	0–1	1–1	2–2	4–0	3–2	1–2	2–2	3–1		2–1	0–1	3–0	1–0	3–1	5–0	2–0
Sheffield United	2–1	3–0	5–0	2–2	1–4	4–2	2–2	3–2	0–1		0–2	3–0	4–0	1–0	2–1	1–0
Small Heath	2–2	1–1	2–0	1–0	3–5	4–4	3–0	1–2	4–4	4–2		4–2	1–1	0–0	1–2	4–3
Stoke	4–1	5–1	5–0	5–1	4–1	1–3	3–1	0–3	2–1	1–3	2–2		2–5	0–2	1–1	0–0
Sunderland	4–4	3–2	4–0	3–0	8–0	2–1	3–2	2–2	2–0	2–0	7–1	3–1		3–1	3–0	2–0
The Wednesday	1–0	4–1	2–1	4–3	1–1	3–0	5–0	0–0	3–1	2–3	2–0	2–4	1–2		3–2	3–1
West Bromwich Albion	3–2	2–0	1–1	0–1	2–2	1–4	5–0	1–0	4–5	1–0	4–1	3–2	0–2	6–0		5–1
Wolverhampton Wanderers	0–4	3–3	4–2	1–0	2–2	1–0	3–1	1–1	1–3	0–3	2–1	0–0	1–4	2–0	3–1	

Legend: Blue = home team win; Yellow = draw; Red = away team win.

=== Maps ===
Locations of the Football League First Division teams

== Second Division ==
Second Division
- Season: 1894–95
- Champions: Bury
- Promoted: Bury
- Matches: 240
- Goals: 1,023 (4.26 per match)
- Top goalscorer: David Skea (22 goals)
- Biggest home win: Notts County 10–0 Burslem Port Vale (26 February 1895)
- Biggest away win: Burton Swifts 0–5 Leicester Fosse (2 March 1895)
- Highest scoring: Manchester City 11–3 Lincoln City (23 March 1895)
- Longest winning run: 8 matches Bury
- Longest unbeaten run: 13 matches Burton Wanderers; Leicester Fosse
- Longest losing run: 9 matches Crewe Alexandra; Walsall Town Swifts

Pos	Team	Pld	W	D	L	GF	GA	GAv	Pts	Qualification or relegation
1	Bury (C, O, P)	30	23	2	5	78	33	2.364	48	Qualification for test matches
2	Notts County	30	17	5	8	75	45	1.667	39	Qualification for test matches
3	Newton Heath	30	15	8	7	78	44	1.773	38	Qualification for test matches
4	Leicester Fosse	30	15	8	7	72	53	1.358	38	
5	Grimsby Town	30	18	1	11	79	52	1.519	37	
6	Darwen	30	16	4	10	74	43	1.721	36	
7	Burton Wanderers	30	14	7	9	67	39	1.718	35	
8	Woolwich Arsenal	30	14	6	10	75	58	1.293	34	
9	Manchester City	30	14	3	13	82	72	1.139	31	
10	Newcastle United	30	12	3	15	72	84	0.857	27	
11	Burton Swifts	30	11	3	16	52	74	0.703	25	
12	Rotherham Town	30	11	2	17	55	62	0.887	24	
13	Lincoln City	30	10	0	20	52	92	0.565	20	Re-elected
14	Walsall Town Swifts (R)	30	10	0	20	47	92	0.511	20	Resigned from league
15	Burslem Port Vale	30	7	4	19	39	77	0.506	18	Re-elected
16	Crewe Alexandra	30	3	4	23	26	103	0.252	10	Re-elected

Rules for classification: 1) Points; 2) Goal average; 3) Goals scored
(C) Champions; (O) Play-off winners; (P) Promoted; (R) Relegated

=== Results ===
Home \ Away	BPV	BRS	BRW	BRY	CRE	DRW	GRI	LEI	LIN	MCI	NEW	NWH	NTC	ROT	WAL	WOO
Burslem Port Vale		2–0	1–0	1–2	4–0	0–3	5–0	1–1	7–1	1–2	4–4	2–5	0–3	1–1	1–0	0–1
Burton Swifts	1–0		2–2	0–1	4–0	3–0	2–1	0–5	6–1	2–1	5–3	1–2	2–2	2–0	1–2	3–0
Burton Wanderers	4–0	1–2		1–2	4–0	2–2	0–0	1–1	4–1	8–0	9–0	1–0	1–0	4–0	7–0	2–1
Bury	4–0	2–0	4–0		4–1	1–0	5–1	4–1	4–1	4–2	4–1	2–1	2–1	2–1	4–1	2–0
Crewe Alexandra	2–2	1–3	1–2	1–5		2–2	2–1	2–2	1–4	2–3	2–1	0–2	0–3	2–1	2–3	0–0
Darwen	2–0	5–0	2–0	0–1	5–0		4–1	8–2	6–0	4–0	5–0	1–1	2–1	4–3	2–0	3–1
Grimsby Town	4–1	7–1	7–2	3–2	5–0	2–1		4–3	3–0	2–1	3–0	2–1	0–1	4–1	1–0	4–2
Leicester Fosse	2–1	2–2	1–2	1–0	4–0	2–1	1–0		2–1	3–1	4–4	2–3	5–1	4–2	9–1	3–1
Lincoln City	6–1	3–2	0–2	1–3	5–2	0–2	1–5	1–2		0–2	3–1	3–0	1–3	2–0	1–0	5–2
Manchester City	4–1	4–1	1–1	3–3	4–1	2–4	2–5	1–1	11–3		4–0	2–5	7–1	1–0	6–1	4–1
Newcastle United	1–2	6–3	3–1	1–0	6–0	3–2	1–4	2–0	4–2	5–4		3–0	2–2	5–2	7–2	2–4
Newton Heath	3–0	5–1	1–1	2–2	6–1	1–1	2–0	2–2	3–0	4–1	5–1		3–3	3–2	9–0	3–3
Notts County	10–0	5–1	2–0	2–1	5–1	2–1	3–2	3–0	3–0	1–3	2–1	1–1		4–2	5–0	2–2
Rotherham Town	2–1	4–1	1–3	2–3	2–0	4–1	3–2	0–1	5–2	3–2	1–0	2–1	1–2		6–1	1–2
Walsall	2–0	4–1	3–1	0–3	4–0	5–1	4–3	1–3	1–2	1–2	2–3	1–2	2–1	1–2		4–1
Woolwich Arsenal	7–0	3–0	1–1	4–2	7–0	4–0	1–3	3–3	5–2	4–2	3–2	3–2	2–1	1–1	6–1	

Updated to match(es) played on unknown. Source: Ian Laschke: Rothmans Book of Football League Records 1888–89 to 1978–79. Macdonald and Jane’s, London & Sydney, 1980.
Legend: Blue = home team win; Yellow = draw; Red = away team win.

=== Maps ===
Locations of the Football League Second Division teams

== Test matches ==
The Football League test matches were a set of play-offs, in which the bottom First Division teams faced the top Second Division teams. The First Division teams, if coming out as winners, would retain their places in the division. If a Second Division team won, it would be considered for First Division membership through an election process. Losing Second Division teams would stay in the Second Division.

As a result of these matches, Bury, Derby County and Stoke were placed in the First Division the following season, while Liverpool, Notts County and Newton Heath went into the Second Division.

27 April 1895

Bury (2nd Div. Champions)	1–0	Liverpool (1st Div. 16th)

Ewood Park
Attendance: 5,000
27 April 1895

Derby County (1st Div. 15th)	2–1	Notts County (2nd Div. 2nd)

Filbert Street
Attendance: 8,000
27 April 1895

Stoke (1st Div. 14th)	3–0	Newton Heath (2nd Div. 3rd)

Athletic Ground
Attendance: 10,000

== Attendances ==
No.	Club	Average	Change
1	Everton	17,420	28,8%
2	Liverpool	12,015	130,4%
3	The Wednesday	9,625	12,6%
4	Aston Villa	8,680	-18,6%
5	Sunderland	8,250	19,7%
6	Blackburn Rovers	7,910	23,2%
7	Sheffield United	7,510	-14,0%
8	Bolton Wanderers	7,375	37,9%
9	Preston North End	6,310	8,8%
10	Small Heath	6,275	105,1%
11	Burnley	6,235	-1,0%
12	West Bromwich Albion	5,955	18,3%
13	Nottingham Forest	5,665	-16,4%
14	Wolverhampton Wanderers	5,300	-15,3%
15	Derby County	4,390	-22,2%
16	Stoke	3,875	-23,6%

== See also ==
- 1894-95 in English football
- 1894 in association football
- 1895 in association football
