= Alex McDonald (footballer, born 1878) =

Scottish footballer (1878–1949)

Personal information
- Full name: Alexander McDonald
- Date of birth: 12 April 1878
- Place of birth: Greenock, Scotland
- Date of death: 22 October 1949 (aged 71)
- Place of death: Greenock, Scotland
- Height: 5 ft 10 in (1.78 m)
- Position: Inside forward

Senior career*
Years	Team	Apps	(Gls)
1899–1900	Jarrow		
1900–1901	Everton	23	(6)
1901	Southampton	5	(5)
1901–1902	West Ham United	4	(2)
1902–1903	Portsmouth	7	(7)
1903–1905	Wellingborough	60	(11)
1905–1907	Luton Town	41	(10)
1907–1910	Croydon Common	30	(10)
1910–1911	Luton Town	1	(0)
- * Club domestic league appearances and goals

Alexander McDonald (12 April 1878 – 22 October 1949) was a Scottish footballer who played as an inside-forward for various clubs in the 1900s.

== Football career ==
McDonald was born in Greenock, Scotland, but started his professional career with Jarrow in north eastern England. From Jarrow, he joined Everton of the Football League First Division in February 1900, making his first-team debut in a 0–0 draw against Blackburn Rovers on 31 March. After a year at Goodison Park during which he made 23 appearances with six goals, McDonald moved to the south coast to join the Southern League champions, Southampton in May 1901.

He made his debut for the "Saints" in the opening match of the 1901–02 season, a 1–1 draw with New Brompton. McDonald scored in the following match, a 2–1 victory at Northampton Town and followed this with four goals in a 5–0 victory over Watford on 21 September 1901. Despite this prolific form, he was then replaced at inside-right by veteran former-England international Harry Wood. Although McDonald made two further appearances in November, his "ambitious temperament" did not suit reserve team football and in December he moved to fellow Southern League Club, West Ham United.

He made his "Hammers" debut on 21 December, scoring both goals in a 2–0 victory over Bristol Rovers. After only three further (goalless) games for West Ham, he returned to Hampshire to join Portsmouth in March 1902.

Before the end of the season, McDonald had scored seven goals from seven appearances for Portsmouth. He thus played for three clubs in the Southern League in 1901–02. He remained with the Fratton Park club for the next season, but failed to make any further Southern League appearances. Despite being a "first-rate marksman", McDonald was unable to command a regular starting place at "Pompey" and in the summer of 1903 he joined another Southern League club, Wellingborough. Two years later he moved on to join Luton Town where he remained for two seasons before joining Croydon Common in 1907.

Croydon Common had just turned professional and had been admitted to the Southern League Second Division. In the 1908–09 season, Common took the Second Division championship and were promoted to the First Division, but finished second from bottom and were relegated back to the Second Division in 1910. McDonald then returned to Luton for a season before retiring.

== Later life ==
McDonald was a member of the Royal Fleet Auxiliary during World War I. He died from drowning in October 1949, aged 71.

== Honours ==
Croydon Common

- Southern League Second Division champions: 1908–09
