= William Henderson (footballer, born 1883) =

Scottish footballer

Personal information
- Date of birth: 1883
- Place of birth: Dundee, Scotland
- Position: Left half

Senior career*
Years	Team	Apps	(Gls)
- Norwood
1905–1907	Dundee	45	(1)
1907–1908	Heart of Midlothian	22	(3)
1908–1909	New Brompton	8	(0)
1909–1910	Bradford City	4	(0)
- Grimsby Town
Total		79+	(4+)
- * Club domestic league appearances and goals

William P. Henderson (born 1883) was a Scottish professional footballer who played as a left half.

== Career ==
Born in Dundee, Henderson played for minor local club Norwood before spells with Scottish League clubs Dundee and Heart of Midlothian. For the latter club he made 22 league appearances, scoring 3 goals, and also featured on the losing side in the 1907 Scottish Cup Final.

He signed for New Brompton of the English Southern League in 1908. He joined the club at the same time as another player also called William Henderson, and the two played alongside each other on six occasions. While his namesake was a regular in the New Brompton team, this Henderson appeared only sporadically, with the last of his eight Southern League appearances coming at home to Portsmouth on 12 December 1908.

He joined Bradford City in May 1909, leaving the club in July 1910 to sign for Grimsby Town. During his time with Bradford City he made four appearances in the Football League.

== Sources ==
- Brown, Tony (2003). The Definitive Gillingham F.C.: A Complete Record. Soccerdata. ISBN 1-899468-20-X.
- Frost, Terry (1988). Bradford City A Complete Record 1903-1988. Breedon Books Sport. ISBN 0-907969-38-0.
- Joyce, Michael (2004). Football League Players' Records 1888 – 1939. Soccerdata. ISBN 1-899468-67-6.
