= Jack Lipsham =

English footballer (1881–1959)

Personal information
- Full name: John Reginald Lipsham
- Date of birth: 1881
- Place of birth: Chester, England
- Date of death: 1959 (aged 77–78)
- Position: Winger

Youth career
- Chester St John's

Senior career*
Years	Team	Apps	(Gls)
1903–1906	Chester		
1906–1907	Liverpool	3	(0)
1907–1913	Chester		
1913–1919	Wrexham		
1919–1921	Chester		
- * Club domestic league appearances and goals

Jack Lipsham (1881 – 1959) was an English footballer. He played in The Football League for Liverpool, although much of his career was spent in non–league football with Chester. He played more than 300 games for the club in three spells.

== Playing career ==
Jack was one of four brothers to play for their hometown club of Chester, with older brother Bert going on to be capped by England. He broke into the side in the left wing slot at the start of the 1903–04 season at a similar time to when brother Tommy was emerging on the right. In 1906 he joined Football League champions Liverpool, but just a year and three appearances later he was back at Chester and helped them win the Welsh Cup in 1908.

Lipsham remained at Chester until the end of the 1912–13 season, when he left for local rivals Wrexham. The move displeased the Chester directors, who felt let down after the home match against Hyde two months earlier had been declared as a benefit match for Lipsham and Billy Matthews, raising £82-10s for the long–serving duo. But he returned to Chester ahead of the 1919–20 season, where he played for two years before retiring.
