= Jonathan Staley =

English footballer

Personal information
- Date of birth: 1868
- Place of birth: Newhall, Derbyshire, England
- Date of death: 1917 (aged 48–49)
- Position: Defender

Senior career*
Years	Team	Apps	(Gls)
1891–1901	Derby County	128	(0)
- * Club domestic league appearances and goals

Jonathan Staley (1868–1917) was an English footballer who played in the Football League for Derby County. A full-back, he made his League debut at Stoke in September 1891, but after his first season, only appeared sporadically until 1898–99, when he secured a place in the team and appeared in the 1899 FA Cup final, which Derby lost 4–1 to Sheffield United. In summer 1901, he joined non-League club Ripley Athletic, before retiring.
