= 1899 FA Cup final =

British association football match

1899 FA Cup Final
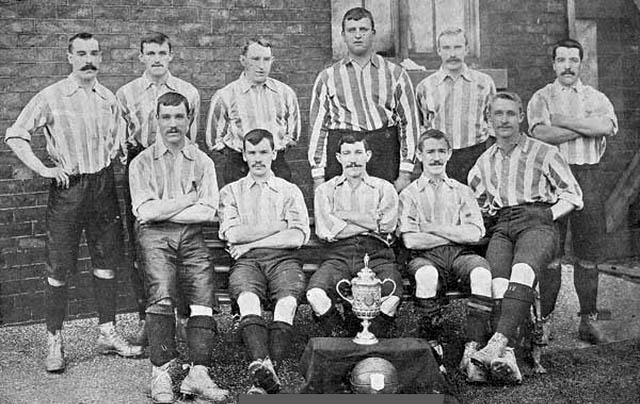
- Sheffield United posing with the trophy
- Event: 1898–99 FA Cup
Derby County	Sheffield United
1	4
- Date: 15 April 1899
- Venue: Crystal Palace, London
- Referee: Aaron Scragg (Crewe, Cheshire)
- Attendance: 73,833

The 1899 FA Cup final was an association football match between Derby County and Sheffield United on Saturday, 15 April 1899 at the Crystal Palace stadium in south London. It was the final match of the 1898–99 FA Cup, the 28th edition of the world's oldest football knockout competition, and England's primary cup competition, the Football Association Challenge Cup, better known as the FA Cup.

Sheffield United were appearing in their first final and Derby County, who had been the 1898 runners-up, in their second. As members of the Football League First Division, they were both exempt from the competition's qualifying phase and joined it in the first round proper, progressing through four rounds to the final.

The final was watched by a crowd of 73,833 and Sheffield United, after being 0–1 down at half-time, dominated the second half of the match to win 4–1 with goals by Walter Bennett, Billy Beer, Jack Almond and Fred Priest after John Boag had scored a first-half opener for Derby. Sheffield United have won the cup four times in all, their next victory being in 1902. Derby County have won it once, in 1946.

== Background ==
The FA Cup, known officially as The Football Association Challenge Cup, is an annual knockout association football competition in men's domestic English football. The competition was first proposed on 20 July 1871 by C. W. Alcock at a meeting of The Football Association committee. The tournament was first played in the 1871–72 season and is the world's oldest association football competition. The 1899 match between Derby County and Sheffield United at Crystal Palace was the 28th final and the penultimate one of the 19th century. Derby County had been runners-up in the previous season's competition while Sheffield United were appearing in the final for the first time.

Derby County and Sheffield United were both members of the Football League First Division. In the 1898–99 league championship, Derby amassed 35 points to finish in ninth place, ten points behind champions Aston Villa. Sheffield United had won the league title in 1897–98 but had struggled in 1898–99 and finished in 16th place with 29 points, just above the relegation placings.

Both teams were selected by a committee with the club secretary in charge on match days. Derby's secretary was Harry Newbould who, in 1900, became their first formally appointed team manager. Sheffield United retained the policy of selection by committee until 1932. In 1899, their secretary was John Nicholson, who was newly appointed.

== Route to the final ==
=== Derby County ===
Round	Opposition	Score
First	Woolwich Arsenal (a)	6–0
Second	Wolverhampton Wanderers (h)	2–1
Third	Southampton (a)	2–1
Semi-final	Stoke FC (n)	3–1
Key: (h) = home venue; (a) = away venue; (n) = neutral venue. Source:

Derby County entered the competition in the first round proper and played four matches en route to the final. Two of their opponents were in the First Division, one was in the Second Division and one was in the Southern League.

==== Early rounds ====
In the first round on Saturday, 28 January, Derby were away to Second Division Woolwich Arsenal at the Manor Ground in Plumstead. They won 6–0 with goals by Steve Bloomer (2), John Boag (2), Billy MacDonald and Harry Allen.

Derby were at home to Wolverhampton Wanderers in the second round. This match was played on Saturday, 11 February, at the Baseball Ground and ended in a 2–1 win for Derby with a goal apiece by Allen and MacDonald. The Wolverhampton scorer was Billy Beats.

In the third round, Derby faced the Southern League champions Southampton at The Dell. The match was played on Saturday, 25 February, and Derby won 2–1 with goals by Bloomer and MacDonald. Southampton's goal was scored by Tom Nicol.

==== Semi-final ====
The semi-finals were staged at neutral venues on Saturday, 18 March, and Derby were drawn to play First Division Stoke FC at Molineux in Wolverhampton. Steve Bloomer scored all three goals in a 3–1 win which took Derby through to a second successive cup final. The Stoke goal was scored by William Maxwell.

=== Sheffield United ===
Round	Opposition	Score
First	Burnley (a)	2–2
First (replay)	Burnley (h)	2–1
Second	Preston North End (a)	2–2
Second (replay)	Preston North End (h)	2–1
Third	Nottingham Forest (a)	1–0
Semi-final	Liverpool (n)	2–2
Semi-final (first replay)	Liverpool (n)	4–4
Semi-final (second replay)	Liverpool (n)	MA
Semi-final (third replay)	Liverpool (n)	1–0
Key: (h) = home venue; (a) = away venue; (n) = neutral venue. Source: MA = match abandoned.

Sheffield United entered the competition in the first round proper and played nine matches, including five replays, en route to the final. Their four opponents were all other teams in the First Division.

==== Early rounds ====
In the first round on Saturday, 28 January, Sheffield were away to Burnley at Turf Moor.

==== Semi-final ====
The semi-finals were staged at neutral venues on Saturday, 18 March, and Sheffield were drawn against Liverpool at Burnden Park in Bolton. This ended in a 2–2 draw and three replays were needed to settle the tie.

The second replay was at the former Fallowfield Stadium in Manchester. This match had to be abandoned at half-time because of a crush in the crowd.

== Match details ==
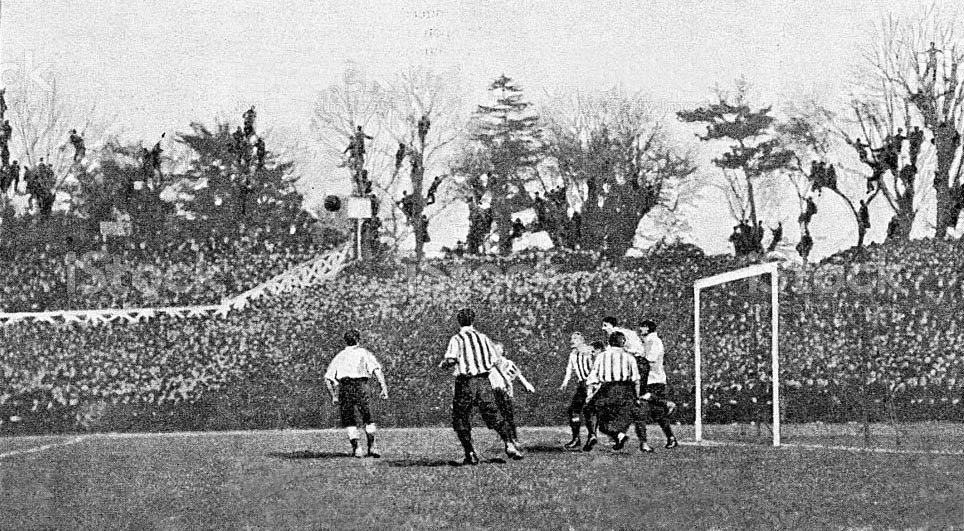
"The Derby goal in danger", a moment of the match

15 April 1899
15:00 GMT

Derby County	1–4	Sheffield United
Boag 12'		Bennett 60'; Beer 65'; Almond 69'; Priest 89'

Crystal Palace, London
Attendance: 73,833
Referee: Aaron Scragg (Crewe)

Derby County	Sheffield United

GK	(England) Jack Fryer
RB	(Scotland) Jimmy Methven
LB	(England) Jonathan Staley
RH	(England) John D. Cox
CH	(Scotland) Robert Paterson
LH	(Scotland) Johnny May
RW	(England) Tommy Arkesden
IR	(England) Steve Bloomer
CF	(Scotland) John Boag
IL	(Scotland) Billy MacDonald
LW	(England) Harry Allen
Club secretary:
Harry Newbould

GK	(England) Willie Foulke
RB	(England) Harry Thickett
LB	(Ireland) Peter Boyle
RH	(England) Harry Johnson
CH	(England) Tom Morren
LH	(England) Ernest Needham (c)
RW	(England) Walter Bennett
IR	(England) Billy Beer
CF	(England) George Hedley
IL	(England) Jack Almond
LW	(England) Fred Priest
Club secretary:
John Nicholson

Match rules

- 90 minutes duration (two halves of 45 minutes each; teams change ends at half-time). (Note: The duration of a football match has been 90 minutes since an agreement in 1866 for the match between London and Sheffield.)
- No extra time if scores level at end of normal time. (Note: The FA introduced the option of extra time into its rules in 1897.) Result to be settled by replay at a later date. (Note: The 1875 final was the first in which a replay took place; this method of deciding the winners continued until 1999. The 2005 final was the first to be settled by penalty shoot-out.)
- No substitutes allowed. (Note: Although there were isolated instances of substitution in earlier times, it was not until the beginning of the 1965–66 season that substitutes were first allowed in English top-class matches, and then only for replacement of injured players.)

Notes

- Players are listed above according to their positions on the field. There was no shirt numbering in 1899. (Note: The first known instance of shirt numbering in English football was in March 1914. It was not until the 1939–40 season that a numbering system was formally introduced.)

== Post-match ==
The crowd of 73,883 was a world record, though it would be beaten only two years later. Derby had lost the final two years in succession and talk began of a gypsy curse on the club, said to have originated after gypsies were forced to leave the land that became the Baseball Ground.

== Bibliography ==
- Collett, Mike (2003). The Complete Record of the FA Cup. Cheltenham: SportsBooks Ltd. ISBN 978-18-99807-19-2.
