= Harry Johnson (footballer, born 1876) =

English footballer

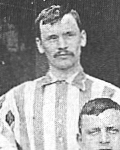

Personal information
- Full name: William Harrison Johnson
- Date of birth: 4 January 1876
- Place of birth: Ecclesfield, Sheffield, England
- Date of death: 17 July 1940 (aged 64)
- Position: Right half

Senior career*
Years	Team	Apps	(Gls)
- Atlas & Norfolk Works
- Ecclesfield Church
1895–1909	Sheffield United	242	(6)

International career
1900–1903	England	6	(1)
- * Club domestic league appearances and goals

William Harrison Johnson (4 January 1876 – 17 July 1940) was an English professional footballer.

== Club career ==
Johnson played for Ecclesfield Church before joining Sheffield United.

He won the 1902 FA Cup Final with Sheffield United, having already lifted the trophy in 1899. That was a year after the team won the 1897–98 Football League; they were runners-up the seasons before and after.

His sons Harry and Tom also became noted footballers for the Blades.

== International career ==
He represented England at international level, scoring on his debut against Ireland, on 17 March 1900. He played six games at international level, his last appearance in an England shirt being three years after his debut, in a match versus Scotland. He also represented the Football League on one occasion.

== Honours ==
Sheffield United

- Football League Division One champions: 1897–98
  - Runners-up: 1896-97, 1899–1900
- FA Cup winners: 1899, 1902
  - Finalists: 1901
