= Geoffrey Plumpton Wilson =

English footballer

Geoffrey Plumpton Wilson (21 February 1878 – 30 July 1934) was an English amateur footballer who played at inside left. He made two appearances for England in 1900, scoring once. He was a member of the Corinthian amateur club and made three appearances for Southampton in 1901.

== Early life and education ==
Wilson was born in Bourne, Lincolnshire, the son of the Revd. Plumpton Stravenson Wilson, and the younger brother of Charles Plumpton Wilson. Their sister Mary was the mother of Archbishop Michael Ramsey.

He was educated at Rossall School and played for the school XI between 1894 and 1896, captaining the side in 1896.

== Football career ==
On leaving school he joined the amateur Corinthian club, where he played between 1897 and 1902, as well as turning out occasionally for Casuals. He made his Corinthian debut at inside-left on 30 October 1897, in a 2–0 victory over Sheffield Wednesday (Corinthian's goals were both scored by Gilbert Smith). His medical career restricted his opportunities to play for Corinthians, and over five years he made 32 appearances, scoring nine goals.

He was called up for England for the Home International Championship match against Wales on 26 March 1900. He played alongside his Corinthian colleagues Tip Foster (also making his international debut) and Gilbert Smith up front, with William Oakley in defence. Wilson scored after three minutes, but Wales equalized through Billy Meredith and the match finished 1–1. He retained his place for the next England match, against Scotland on 7 April. Scotland won the match easily by four goals to one, with a hat trick from Robert McColl.

He was a friend and colleague of C. B. Fry, who recommended him to Southampton who engaged him as cover for the injured Albert Brown for three consecutive matches in October/November 1901. Although he showed "flashes of his international quality", he left The Dell in November to concentrate on his medical studies.

== Life outside football ==
He qualified as a physician and surgeon in 1902, and went on to make a number of appearances for the London Hospitals side.

He also played Minor Counties cricket for Lincolnshire including playing against India in 1911.

He died on 30 July 1934 at Ketton near Stamford, Lincolnshire.
