= Bert Lipsham =

English footballer and manager

Personal information
- Full name: Herbert Broughall Lipsham
- Date of birth: 29 April 1878
- Place of birth: Chester, England
- Date of death: 22 March 1932 (aged 53)
- Place of death: York, Ontario, Canada
- Position: Midfielder

Senior career*
Years	Team	Apps	(Gls)
1895–1898	Chester City		
1898–1900	Crewe Alexandra		
1900–1908	Sheffield United		
1908–1910	Fulham	56	(5)
1910–1913	Millwall	85	(13)

International career
1902	England	1	(0)

Managerial career
- 1911–1918: Millwall
- * Club domestic league appearances and goals

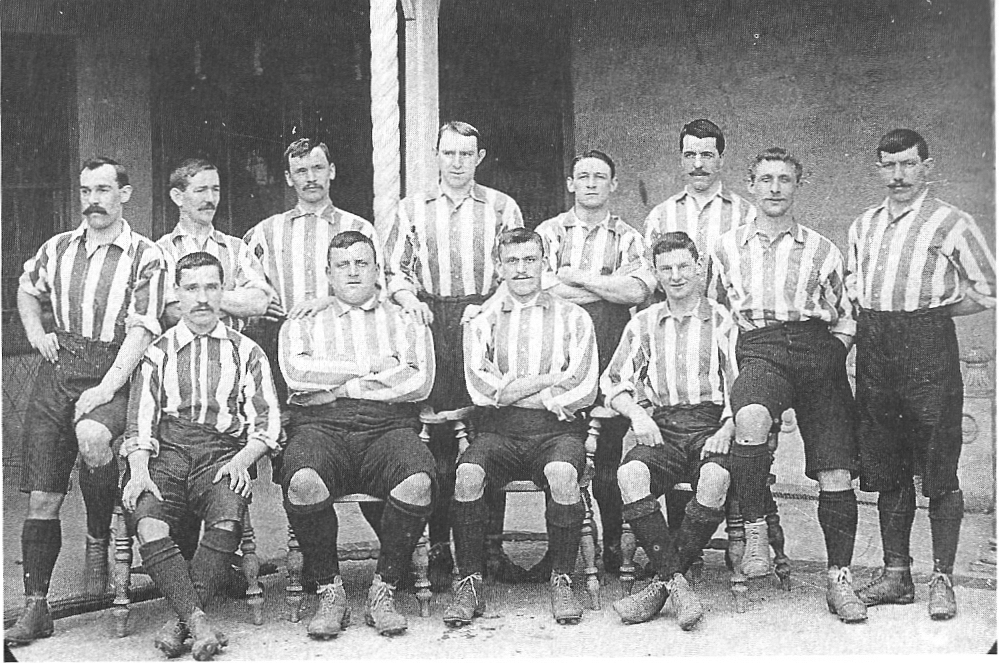
The 1901 losing Cup Final team; Lipsham is seated on the right.

Herbert Broughall Lipsham (29 April 1878 – 22 March 1932) was a professional footballer who won the 1902 FA Cup Final with Sheffield United.

== Club career ==
Educated at the King's School, Chester Lipsham was a goal-scoring outside left. He began by playing in his home city with Chester St Oswalds before making his debut for Chester in the 1895–96 season. He was one of four brothers to play for Chester, with the others including Jack who went on to play for Liverpool.

After a spell with Rockferry, Lipsham joined Crewe Alexandra in the 1898–99 season as a professional and was an immediate success. So much so that Derby County, Notts County and Sheffield United showed an immediate interest in him.

Crewe were not anxious to part with him, but a substantial offer induced them to transfer him to Sheffield United in 1900. After that, he was an invaluable member of the successful Blades team of that period. A quiet, unassuming and well-behaved young man, he was famous for his hard-hit crosses, which produced a lot of goals for his central strikers. Lipsham played in the successful FA Cup Final team when Sheffield United beat Southampton 2–1 in a replay on 26 April 1902. He moved to Fulham in 1908.

== Managerial career ==
Lipsham was appointed manager at Millwall on 4 May 1911, retaining the position until the First World War.

== International career ==
Lipsham was capped by England against Wales on 3 March 1902, aged 23 years.

== Other information ==
He also had a tobacconist shop at 142 Bramall Lane.

Lipsham was a member of the first management committee of the PFA and later moved to Canada where he became involved in the development of football.

== Honours ==
Sheffield United

- FA Cup winner: 1902
- FA Cup finalist: 1901
