= Charles Plumpton Wilson =

England dual-international footballer & rugby union player

Personal information
- Full name: Charles Plumpton Wilson
- Date of birth: 12 May 1859
- Place of birth: Roydon, Norfolk, England
- Date of death: 9 March 1938 (aged 78)
- Place of death: Dereham, Norfolk, England
- Position: Half-back

Senior career*
Years	Team	Apps	(Gls)
- Hendon
- Casuals
1883	Corinthian	1	(0)

International career
1884	England	2	(0)
Rugby union career
Amateur team(s)
Years	Team	Apps	(Points)
1877–1880	Cambridge University	4	
International career
Years	Team	Apps	(Points)
1880–1881	England	1	
- * Club domestic league appearances and goals

Charles Plumpton Wilson (12 May 1859 – 9 March 1938) was an English amateur footballer who played at wing-half. He made two appearances for England in 1884. He was also capped for the England national rugby union team in 1881, and was one of only three players to be capped for England at both association football and rugby football. He became a schoolmaster.

== Education ==
Wilson was born in Roydon, Norfolk, the son of the Revd. Plumpton Stravenson Wilson of West Pinchbeck Parsonage, Spalding, Lincolnshire. Via his sister Mary he was uncle to polymath Frank Ramsey and Archbishop Michael Ramsey.

He was educated at Uppingham School and Marlborough College where he was a member of the cricket eleven in 1876 and 1877 and of the football team in 1876.

He went up to Trinity College, Cambridge, where he proved an outstanding all-round sportsman. He represented the university in the twenty-five-mile bicycle race against Oxford in 1879, won his "blue" at rugby football in each of the years from 1877 to 1880, and at cricket in 1880 and 1881.

After graduating, Wilson served as an assistant master at Elstree School, Hertfordshire, from 1881 to 1898. In 1898 he founded Sandroyd School in Cobham, Surrey, and was headmaster from 1898 to 1920.

== Sporting career ==
=== Rugby Union ===
Wilson came to note as a rugby player when he was selected for the Cambridge University team whilst studying at Trinity. He won four sporting Blues in rugby, playing in The Varsity Match from 1877 to 1880, and was made team captain in the 1880 encounter. He made his solitary international appearance for England in their first match against Wales played on 19 February 1881 at Richardson's Field in Blackheath. England recorded their largest victory, defeating the Welsh 30–0 and scoring 13 tries in the process.

=== Cricket ===
Wilson represented Cambridge University ten times in 1880 and 1881. With the bat he only scored 157 runs in the two seasons at an average of 14.27. He was more successful as a right-arm medium pace bowler, taking 22 wickets at an average of 19.95. His best performance came against Surrey in June 1881, when he claimed 5 wickets for 34 runs in Surrey's second innings, as the university won by 9 wickets.

He played minor counties cricket for Lincolnshire in 1880 and for Norfolk from 1881 to 1884.

=== Football ===
While teaching at Elstree, Wilson joined Hendon Football Club and took part in their FA Cup matches, including that in the 1883–84 First Round on 10 November 1883 when they defeated the previous season's FA Cup finalists Old Etonians 3–2. He also played once for the Corinthian amateur side in a 3–1 victory over Cambridge University on 21 November 1883.

This brought him to the attention of the England selectors, who picked him for the inaugural season Home International Championship match against Scotland on 15 March 1884. In a close match at Cathkin Park, the Scots won 1–0. Despite the defeat, Wilson retained his place for the next match against Wales on 17 March, which England won comfortably 4–0, including two goals from William Bromley-Davenport.

He was thus one of only three players to represent England at both Association football and Rugby football, the others being Reginald Birkett and John Willie Sutcliffe.

== Family ==
Wilson's younger brother Geoffrey made two appearances for the England national football team in 1900.

Charles Wilson died at Eckling Grange, East Dereham, Norfolk, on 9 March 1938, aged 78.
