= Henry Allan =

Henry Allan may refer to:

- Henry William Allan (politician) (1843–1913), Canadian politician, merchant and produce dealer
- Henry Allan (painter) (1865–1912), Irish painter
- Henry Allan (footballer) (1872–1965), Scottish footballer
- Henry Allan (cricketer) (1846–1926), Australian cricketer
- Henry William Allan (rugby union) (1850–1926), Scottish rugby player

== See also ==
- Henry Allen (disambiguation)
- Harry Allan (disambiguation)
- Harry Allen (disambiguation)
- Harold Allen (disambiguation)
