= Bernard Wilkinson =

English footballer

Personal information
- Full name: Bernard Wilkinson Pickles
- Date of birth: 12 March 1878
- Place of birth: Thorpe Hesley, Yorkshire
- Date of death: 28 May 1949 (aged 71)
- Height: 5 ft 6 in (1.68 m)
- Position: Defender

Youth career
- Thorpe Hesley
- Shiregreen

Senior career*
Years	Team	Apps	(Gls)
1899–1913	Sheffield United	373	(14)
1913–1915	Rotherham Town		

International career
1904	England	1	(0)
- * Club domestic league appearances and goals

Bernard Wilkinson (né Pickles; 12 March 1878 – 28 May 1949) was a professional footballer who won the 1902 FA Cup final with Sheffield United.

== Honours ==
Sheffield United

- FA Cup winner: 1902
