= Game of three halves =

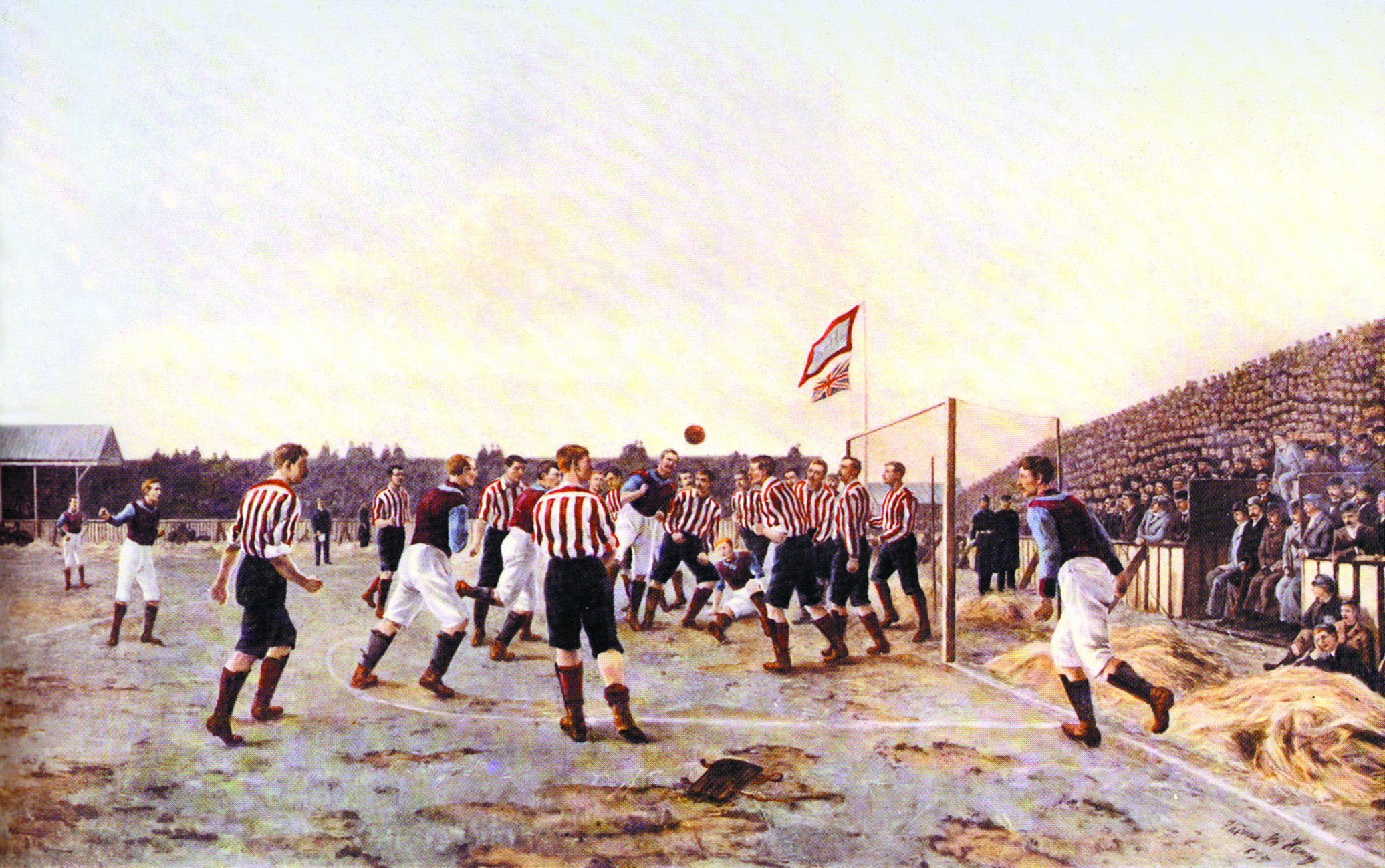
- The game took place at Sunderland's Newcastle Road ground, depicted in this painting from 1895.
- Event: 1894–95 Football League
| Sunderland | Derby County |
| (3+)8 | 0 |
- Date: 1 September 1894
- Referee: John Conqueror, Tom Kirkham
- Attendance: 9,000

The "Game of three halves" was a football match played between Sunderland and Derby County on the opening day of the 1894–95 English football season.

Derby had travelled to Sunderland on 1 September for their first round fixture in the new First Division season, but as the nominated referee, Tom Kirkham, was running late, the game started with a replacement referee, John Conqueror, in charge.

After 45 minutes play, with Sunderland leading 3–0, Kirkham arrived and, "to the surprise of everyone", ordered that the game be restarted from scratch.

Two more halves followed, thus allowing three halves to be played, but the decision to start the match again did not help Derby. They conceded three further goals in the "second half" and five goals in the "third half" to officially lose the match 8–0.

== Details ==
=== 1st half ===
September 1, 1894

| Sunderland | 3–0 | Derby County |
|---|---|---|
| Millar Campbell 15'; Hannah ?'; Hyslop 40' | Report |

Newcastle Road, Sunderland
Attendance: 9,000
Referee: John Conqueror (England)

=== 2nd half and 3rd half ===
September 1, 1894

| Sunderland | 8–0 | Derby County |
|---|---|---|
| Hannah 4'; Millar Campbell ?', 30', ?', ?'; Hyslop ?', ?'; Gillespie ?' | Report |

Newcastle Road, Sunderland
Attendance: 9,000
Referee: Tom Kirkham (England)
