= Robert Paterson (footballer) =

Scottish footballer

Personal information
- Full name: Robert Paterson
- Place of birth: Glasgow, Scotland
- Position: Centre half

Senior career*
Years	Team	Apps	(Gls)
1896–1897	Clyde		
1897–1900	Derby County	19	(1)
1900	Coventry City		
Total		19	(1)
- * Club domestic league appearances and goals

Robert Paterson was a Scottish footballer who played in the Football League for Derby County. Paterson played in the 1899 FA Cup Final defeat against Sheffield United.
