= 1902 FA Cup final =

British association football match

- Event: 1901–02 FA Cup
Sheffield United	Southampton
- Sheffield United won after a replay

Final
Sheffield United	Southampton
1	1
- Date: 19 April 1902
- Venue: Crystal Palace, London
- Referee: Tom Kirkham (Burslem, Staffordshire)
- Attendance: 74,479
- Weather: Dry, moderate wind

Replay
Sheffield United	Southampton
2	1
- Date: 26 April 1902
- Venue: Crystal Palace, London
- Referee: Tom Kirkham (Burslem, Staffordshire)
- Attendance: 33,068
- Weather: Windy and bitterly cold

The 1902 FA Cup final was an association football match between Sheffield United and Southampton on Saturday, 19 April 1902 at the Crystal Palace stadium in south London. It was the final match of the 1901–02 FA Cup, the 31st edition of the world's oldest football knockout competition, and England's primary cup competition, the Football Association Challenge Cup, better known as the FA Cup.

Sheffield United were appearing in their third final and Southampton in their second – Sheffield United won the cup in 1899 and were runners-up in 1901; Southampton were runners-up in 1900. Both teams joined the competition in the first round proper and progressed through four rounds to the final. As a member of the Football League First Division, Sheffield United were exempt from the competition's qualifying phase. Southampton, as a member of the Southern League would normally have been required to pre-qualify but, as champions of the Southern League in 1900–01, they were given byes through the qualifying phase to the first round.

The final was watched by a crowd of 74,479 and ended in a 1–1 draw. The goalscorers were Alf Common for Sheffield United and, in controversial circumstances, Harry Wood for Southampton. A replay was held a week later on 26 April, also at the Crystal Palace stadium, but before a much-reduced crowd of 33,068. Sheffield United won 2–1 with goals by George Hedley and Billy Barnes against one by Albert Brown for Southampton. Sheffield United won the cup again in 1915 and 1925. Southampton, whose appearance in the 1902 final was the last by a team from outside The Football League, won the cup in 1976.

== Background ==
The FA Cup, known officially as The Football Association Challenge Cup, is an annual knockout association football competition in men's domestic English football. The competition was first proposed on 20 July 1871 by C. W. Alcock at a meeting of The Football Association committee. The tournament was first played in the 1871–72 season and is the world's oldest association football competition. The 1902 match between Sheffield United and Southampton at Crystal Palace was the 31st final and the second of the 20th century. Sheffield United were appearing in the final for the third time, having defeated Derby County 4–1 in 1899 and lost 1–3 to Tottenham Hotspur in the 1901 replay. Southampton were making their second appearance after losing 0–4 to Bury in 1900.

Sheffield United were members of the Football League First Division and, in the 1901–02 league championship, amassed 33 points to finish in 10th position, only three points clear of the relegation placings. Southampton were the reigning Southern League champions, but they slipped to third place in the 1901–02 championship, five points behind new champions Portsmouth. Southern League teams normally had to qualify for the first round proper of the FA Cup but, as champions, Southampton were exempted from pre-qualification and were given byes to the first round.

Sheffield United's team between 1889 and 1932 was selected by a committee but with the club secretary in charge of the team on match days. In 1902, this was John Nicholson. Southampton's club secretary Ernest Arnfield took charge of their team on match days.

== Route to the final ==
=== Sheffield United ===
Round	Opposition	Score
First	Northampton Town (a)	2–0
Second	Bolton Wanderers (h)	2–1
Third	Newcastle United (a)	1–1
Third (replay)	Newcastle United (h)	2–1
Semi-final	Derby County (n)	1–1
Semi-final (replay)	Derby County (n)	1–1
Semi-final (second replay)	Derby County (n)	1–0
Key: (h) = home venue; (a) = away venue; (n) = neutral venue. Source:

Sheffield United entered the competition in the first round proper and played seven matches, including three replays, en route to the final. They played against three teams from the First Division and one from the Southern League.

==== Early rounds ====
In the first round, they were drawn away on Saturday, 25 January to the Southern League's Northampton Town, and won 2–0. The goals were scored by Walter Bennett and Alf Common.

Sheffield were drawn at home in the second round against First Division Bolton Wanderers. The match was played at Bramall Lane on Saturday, 8 February and Sheffield won 2–1. The Sheffield goalscorers were Bennett and Fred Priest. James McKee scored for Bolton.

Sheffield faced First Division opposition again in the third round (the quarter-final stage) having been drawn away to Newcastle United. This tie went to a replay after a 1–1 draw at St James' Park on Saturday, 22 February. In its report of the third round matches, The Times mentioned that Newcastle had beaten the league-leaders Sunderland and so were confident of success against Sheffield. However, as the report says, Sheffield United had a "reputation as keen fighters in cup ties". Sheffield led 1–0 at half-time and The Times says "Newcastle only managed to draw the match after a great struggle". Sheffield's goal was scored by Priest. The Newcastle equaliser was scored by Willie Stewart.

Five days later, Sheffield won 2–1 in the replay at Bramall Lane. Their goalscorers were Ernest Needham and Common. R. S. McColl scored for Newcastle.

==== Semi-final ====
The semi-finals were staged at neutral venues on Saturday, 15 March, and Sheffield United were drawn to play Derby County at The Hawthorns in West Bromwich. The result was a 1–1 draw before a crowd of 33,603. The Times report says that Derby were the better team and "deserved to win". After Derby took an early lead through Ben Warren, Sheffield's second-half equaliser was scored against the run of play by George Hedley after a mistake by the Derby goalkeeper, Jack Fryer, and The Times says this cost Derby a victory.

The replay was arranged for Thursday, 20 March at Molineux in Wolverhampton and this also ended 1–1, watched by 13,284. In a brief report, The Times mentioned that the weather was "squally" and conditions were therefore difficult. The match went to extra time and the goalscorers were Priest for Sheffield and Dick Wombwell for Derby.

A second replay was necessary and was played a week later on Thursday, 27 March, at the City Ground in Nottingham. The crowd figure was about 15,000. This time the deadlock was broken. Priest scored the only goal of the game after Derby had missed a penalty and Sheffield United won 1–0 to reach their third final in four seasons.

=== Southampton ===
Round	Opposition	Score
First	Tottenham Hotspur (a)	1–1
First (replay)	Tottenham Hotspur (h)	2–2
First (second replay)	Tottenham Hotspur (n)	2–1
Second	Liverpool (h)	4–1
Third	Bury (a)	3–2
Semi-final	Nottingham Forest (n)	3–1
Key: (h) = home venue; (a) = away venue; (n) = neutral venue. Source:

Like Sheffield United, Southampton entered the competition in the first round proper and played six matches, including two replays, en route to the final. They played against three teams from the First Division and one from the Southern League.

==== Early rounds ====
In the first round, Southampton were drawn away to their Southern League rivals, Tottenham Hotspur, who were the FA Cup-holders. The match was played at White Hart Lane on Saturday, 25 January before a crowd of 20,000 and ended in a 1–1 draw. The goals were scored by David Copeland for Tottenham and Tommy Bowman for Southampton.

The replay at The Dell was played on Wednesday, 29 January. The crowd was 10,000 and the match ended in another draw, this time 2–2. Extra time was played but without any change in the score and a second replay was necessary. The Tottenham goals were both scored by Ted Hughes and Southampton's scorers were Edgar Chadwick and Joe Turner.

The second replay was played on a neutral venue at Elm Park, the home of Reading FC, on Monday, 3 February, in front of a crowd of only 6,000. The pitch was icy and covered in snow, so much so that the touchlines had to be painted blue, and the match kicked off with snow still falling. As in their first two meetings, the teams were very evenly matched and the tie was eventually decided by a mistake. The score at half-time was 0–0 but then Tottenham took the lead with a goal by Jack Kirwan. Southampton equalised very quickly with a goal by Archie Turner and then, when it looked as if the match would end in another draw, Tottenham's Sandy Tait made a poor backpass to his goalkeeper Fred Griffiths. It was intercepted by Albert Brown who rounded Griffiths to score the winning goal.

In the second round on Saturday, 8 February, Southampton were drawn at home against the reigning Football League champions Liverpool, who had dropped into a mid-table position in the First Division. According to the Southampton trainer Bill Dawson, the match was "the finest exhibition of football put up by (Southampton)". Southampton won 4–1 with goals from Archie Turner (2), Joe Turner and Bert Lee. Liverpool's goal was scored by George Fleming.

Southampton then faced First Division Bury at Gigg Lane in the third round on Saturday, 22 February. Bury had outplayed Southampton in the 1900 FA Cup Final, winning 4–0, so Southampton wanted to redress the balance somewhat. In a match that Collett, Chalk and Holley have described as a "real thriller", Southampton took a measure of revenge by winning 3–2. As described in Chalk and Holley's account, the match was all square at 2–2 with goals by Harry Wood and Joe Turner matching those by George Ross and Charlie Sagar for the home side. Injuries to the two Southampton goalscorers had reduced them to nine players and the team were defending "desperately" to hang on for a replay. After a spell of seven successive corners for Bury, Albert Brown broke up the pitch with most of the Bury players in the Southampton half. After sprinting the full length of the pitch, Brown unleashed a shot that hit the crossbar and rebounded over his head. Edgar Chadwick was following up and trapped the ball, feinted to go past the goalkeeper and, as the match report says, "coolly slotted the ball in the other corner" to secure victory.

==== Semi-final ====
In the semi-final on Saturday, 15 March, Southampton returned to White Hart Lane, this time a neutral venue, to play First Division Nottingham Forest and won 3–1 after extra time. The score was 1–1 at the end of normal time after goals by Chadwick for Southampton and John Calvey for Forest. In extra time, Albert Brown scored twice, once from the penalty spot and then, in the final minute, with what the match report called "a wonderful goal with a screw shot from an oblique angle".

Southampton were now in the final for the second time in three years and it was the third season in succession that a Southern League team had reached the final. Meanwhile, with Sheffield United needing two replays to settle their semi-final against Derby County, Southampton sought an advantage by sending Harry Wood to the City Ground in Nottingham so that he could "spy" on them in their second replay.

== Match ==
=== Pre-match ===
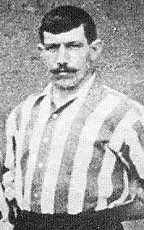
Ernie Needham, Sheffield United's captain

In the build up to the final, Sheffield United's captain Ernie "Nudger" Needham, vowed to make amends for their defeat by Tottenham in the 1901 final, declaring that his team "had let the north down". Needham, an England international, had written Association Football, published in 1901. It was an instruction book on football tactics which The Outlook described as "a valuable book by a practical expert".

For extra preparation, Southampton's players went to nearby Chilworth and stayed at the Clump Inn which had useful training facilities. They had doubts about the fitness of both goalkeeper Jack Robinson, who had caught a chill at the training camp, and defender C. B. Fry, who had been injured, but both were declared fit to play. In the early years of the FA Cup, only amateur players could take part but professionalism now dominated to the extent that Fry, also an England international cricketer, was the first amateur to play in the final since 1893.

=== First match ===
The first match was played at Crystal Palace on Saturday, 19 April before a crowd of 74,479. The weather was cloudy but dry with a moderate wind. Many fans tried to get a better view of the match by climbing the surrounding trees which, according to David Bull and Bob Brunskell, "shook as though whipped by a gale, denoting the enthusiasm of adventurous individuals who were in their branches". There was clash of kit as both teams normally played in red and white stripes. It was agreed that Southampton would wear their normal kit and Sheffield United wore white shirts with dark shorts.

No goals were scored in the first half. Sheffield United took the lead early in the second half with a goal by Alf Common. They appeared to be on their way to victory when, with two minutes to play, Southampton's captain Harry Wood equalised. Wood had been in an offside position tying up his bootlaces when the ball reached him. After consultation between the referee and his linesmen, the officials decided that the ball had struck a United defender, thus playing Wood onside. No extra time was played and the result was a 1–1 draw, necessitating a replay.

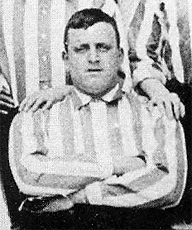
Sheffield United goalkeeper William "Fatty" Foulke

At the end of the game United's goalkeeper, William "Fatty" Foulke, protested to the officials that the equalising goal should not have been allowed. Foulke, who was reputed to weigh more than 20 stone (280 pounds; or 127 kg), left his dressing room unclothed and angrily pursued the referee, Tom Kirkham, who took refuge in a broom cupboard. Foulke had to be stopped by a group of FA officials from wrenching the cupboard door off its hinges to reach the hapless referee.

The Times criticised the teams for persistent foul play and named Southampton as the worst offenders, calling them the "chief delinquents". The match was ruined by frequent stoppages for free kicks. The reporter said of the controversial equaliser that it was "a doubtful goal". The reporter praised the Sheffield defence, especially the three half-backs and Needham in particular. Sheffield were handicapped by injuries to their right-side forwards, Walter Bennett and Alf Common, but the half-backs raised their games and took on the extra work needed while, as directed by Needham, most of Sheffield's attacks were from left-side.

=== Replay ===
The replay took place a week later on 26 April, again at Crystal Palace. On a bitterly cold and windy day, the crowd was 33,068, less than half the number who had watched the first match. As Southampton had worn red and white stripes in the first match, this time they swapped to white shirts with Sheffield in their normal stripes. Southampton fielded an unchanged team; Sheffield had to replace Walter Bennett, who had an ankle injury, with Billy Barnes. Barnes played at inside right and Alf Common moved to Bennett's right wing position.

Two minutes into the game, Southampton goalkeeper Robinson stumbled when trying to intercept a cross by Bert Lipsham, allowing George Hedley to score the opening goal for Sheffield. Playing against the wind, Southampton pressed for an equaliser and Foulke was kept busy throughout the rest of the first half but Southampton wasted their chances. According to The Times, "Boyle and Needham were very good" for Sheffield, while Common was always a danger when running down the right wing. Sheffield maintained their lead until half-time.

Southampton hoped to do better in the second half with the wind behind them but, as before, they wasted chances and were unable to overcome the Sheffield half-backs. Eventually, however, Albert Brown equalised after 70 minutes with a shot from a pass by Chadwick. The Times says that Southampton then had the upper hand for several minutes and "should have scored" again. Foulke had to make saves from Chadwick, Wood and Lee. It looked as though the match was going into extra time, when, with ten minutes remaining, Robinson failed to cut out a cross from Common and Barnes was left with an unguarded net to score the winner for Sheffield. Southampton had a chance to equalise in the final minute, but Fry kicked the ball high over the crossbar.

== Details ==
=== Final ===
19 April 1902
15:30 GMT

Sheffield United	1–1	Southampton
Common 55'		Wood 88'

Crystal Palace, London
Attendance: 74,479
Referee: Tom Kirkham, Burslem
Linesmen: A. Davis & J. Howcroft

Sheffield United	Southampton

GK	(England) Willie Foulke
RB	(England) Harry Thickitt
LB	(Ireland) Peter Boyle
RH	(England) Ernest Needham (c)
CH	(England) Bernie Wilkinson
LH	(England) Harry Johnson
RW	(England) Walter Bennett
IR	(England) Alf Common
CF	(England) George Hedley
IL	(England) Fred Priest
LW	(England) Bert Lipsham
Club secretary:
(England) John Nicholson

GK	(England) Jack Robinson
RB	(England) C. B. Fry
LB	(England) George Molyneux
RH	(Scotland) Samuel Meston
CH	(Scotland) Tommy Bowman
LH	(England) Bert Lee
RW	(England) Archie Turner
IR	(England) Harry Wood (c)
CF	(England) Albert Brown
IL	(England) Edgar Chadwick
LW	(England) Joe Turner
Club secretary:
(England) Er Arnfield

Match rules

- 90 minutes duration (two halves of 45 minutes each; teams change ends at half-time). (Note: The duration of a football match has been 90 minutes since an agreement in 1866 for the match between London and Sheffield.)
- No extra time if scores level at end of normal time. (Note: The FA introduced the option of extra time into its rules in 1897.) Result to be settled by replay at a later date. (Note: The 1875 final was the first in which a replay took place; this method of deciding the winners continued until 1999. The 2005 final was the first to be settled by penalty shoot-out.)
- No substitutes allowed. (Note: Although there were isolated instances of substitution in earlier times, it was not until the beginning of the 1965–66 season that substitutes were first allowed in English top-class matches, and then only for replacement of injured players.)

Notes

- Players are listed above according to their positions on the field. There was no shirt numbering in 1902. (Note: The first known instance of shirt numbering in English football was in March 1914. It was not until the 1939–40 season that a numbering system was formally introduced.)

=== Replay ===
26 April 1902
15:30 GMT

Sheffield United	2–1	Southampton
Hedley 2'; Barnes 79'		Brown 70'

Crystal Palace, London
Attendance: 33,068
Referee: Tom Kirkham, Burslem
Linesmen: A. Davis & J. Howcroft

Sheffield United	Southampton

GK	(England) Willie Foulke
RB	(England) Harry Thickitt
LB	(Ireland) Peter Boyle
RH	(England) Ernest Needham (c)
CH	(England) Bernie Wilkinson
LH	(England) Harry Johnson
RW	(England) Alf Common
IR	(England) Billy Barnes
CF	(England) George Hedley
IL	(England) Fred Priest
LW	(England) Bert Lipsham
Club secretary:
(England) John Nicholson

GK	(England) Jack Robinson
RB	(England) C. B. Fry
LB	(England) George Molyneux
RH	(Scotland) Samuel Meston
CH	(Scotland) Tommy Bowman
LH	(England) Bert Lee
RW	(England) Archie Turner
IR	(England) Harry Wood (c)
CF	(England) Albert Brown
IL	(England) Edgar Chadwick
LW	(England) Joe Turner
Club secretary:
(England) Er Arnfield

Match rules

- 90 minutes duration (two halves of 45 minutes each; teams change ends at half-time).
- 30 minutes of extra time if scores level at end of normal time.
- Replay at a later date if scores still level at end of extra time.
- No substitutes allowed.

Notes

- Players are listed above according to their positions on the field. There was no shirt numbering in 1902.

== Post-match ==
The trophy was presented to Ernie Needham by Lady Beatrice Villiers, who was accompanied by her father Lord Jersey. The Times said of the replay that it had been a good, hard game and without the "foul work" that had ruined the original match. In the reporter's opinion, the replay was "one of the best finals seen for some years".

Sheffield United have made three further FA Cup final appearances. They won in both 1915 against Chelsea and 1925 against Cardiff City, but lost to Arsenal in 1936. Southampton have played in two more finals. They won the cup in 1976 when they defeated Manchester United, but lost to Arsenal in 2003.

Southampton were the third Southern League team in succession to reach the FA Cup final, following themselves in 1900 and Tottenham in 1901. They remain the last team from outside the Football League to reach the final. Southern League teams began joining the Football League in the 1900s – Tottenham's application was accepted in 1908 and Southampton, along with several other clubs, joined in 1920.

== Bibliography ==
- Bull, David; Brunskell, Bob (2000). Match of the Millennium. Southampton: Hagiology Publishing. ISBN 978-09-53447-41-1.
- Chalk, Gary; Holley, Duncan (1987). Saints – A Complete Record. Derby: Breedon Books. ISBN 978-09-07969-22-8.
- Collett, Mike (2003). The Complete Record of the FA Cup. Cheltenham: SportsBooks Ltd. ISBN 978-18-99807-19-2.
- Lloyd, Guy; Holt, Nick (2005). The FA Cup – The Complete Story. London: Aurum Press. ISBN 978-18-45130-54-1.
