= Fred Cook (footballer, born 1880) =

English footballer

Personal information
- Full name: Frederick William Cook
- Date of birth: 1880
- Place of birth: Hardingstone, England
- Date of death: 1934 (aged 53–54)
- Position: Goalkeeper

Senior career*
Years	Team	Apps	(Gls)
1902–1903	Northampton Town		
1903–1905	West Bromwich Albion	28	(0)
1905–1906	Portsmouth		
Total		28	(0)
- * Club domestic league appearances and goals

Frederick William Cook (1880–1934) was an English footballer who played as a goalkeeper in the Football League for West Bromwich Albion and in the Southern League for Northampton Town and Portsmouth.
