= Henry Allen (footballer) =

English footballer (1898–1976)

Personal information
- Full name: Henry Albert Allen
- Date of birth: 1898
- Place of birth: Hackney, England
- Date of death: 1976 (aged 77–78)

Senior career*
Years	Team	Apps	(Gls)
- Gnome Athletic
1920–1921	Southend United	23	(0)
1923	Gillingham	6	(0)
1924–1925	Charlton Athletic	38	(1)
- Grays Thurrock
- * Club domestic league appearances and goals

Henry Albert Allen (1898–1976) was an English professional footballer of the 1920s. Born in Hackney, he joined Gillingham from Southend United in 1923 and went on to make six appearances for the club in The Football League. He left to join Charlton Athletic in 1924.
