= Harry Allen (footballer, born 1879) =

English footballer (1879–1939)

Personal information
- Full name: Henry Allen
- Date of birth: 1879
- Place of birth: Spondon, England
- Date of death: 1939 (aged 59–60)
- Position: Winger

Senior career*
Years	Team	Apps	(Gls)
1897–1898	Alvaston		
1898–1899	Derby County	15	(3)
1900–1901	Leicester Fosse	13	(2)
1900–1901	Derby County	0	(0)
1900	Alvaston & Boulton		
1901	(Rhodesia)		
Total		28	(5)
- * Club domestic league appearances and goals

Henry Allen (1879–1939) was an English footballer who played in the Football League for Derby County and Leicester Fosse. He was a member of the Derby team which lost 4–1 to Sheffield United in the 1899 FA Cup Final.
