= Henry C. Allen (1844–1925) =

American politician

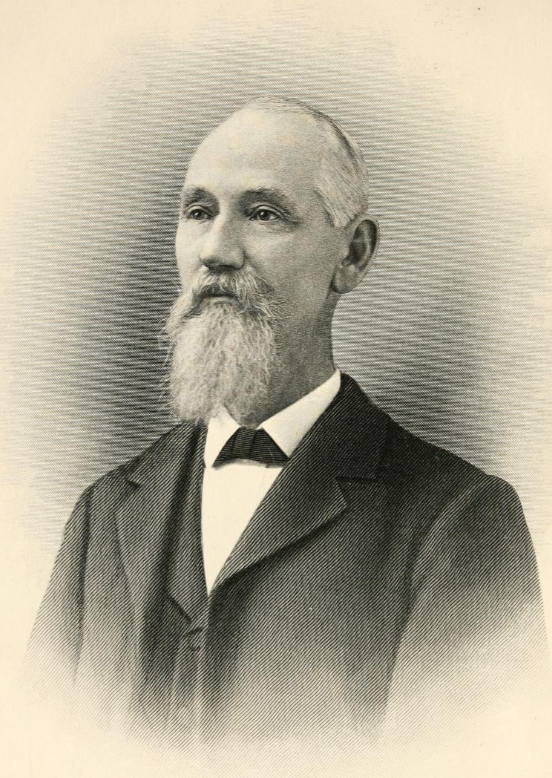
- Allen in 1908 publication

Member of the Virginia House of Delegates from the Pittsylvania County district
- In office 1897–1898

Personal details
- Born: Henry Clay Allen; November 4, 1844 Pittsylvania County, Virginia, U.S.
- Died: June 5, 1925 (aged 80)
- Party: Democratic
- Spouse(s): Elizabeth Taylor (m. 1867) Ora Graves (m. 1901)
- Children: 12
- Occupation: Politician; farmer
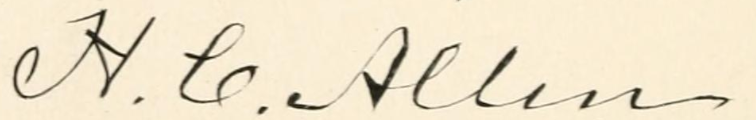
- Signature

Henry Clay Allen (November 4, 1844 – June 5, 1925) was an American politician and farmer from Virginia. He served as a member of the Virginia House of Delegates, representing Pittsylvania County, from 1897 to 1898.

== Early life ==
Henry Clay Allen was born on November 4, 1844, in Pittsylvania County, Virginia, to Lavicia Forrest (née Vaden) and James Green Allen. Allen's father died when he was nine years old. He then worked on a farm when not in school.

== Career ==
Allen enlisted in March 1862 as a private in the 38th Virginia Infantry Regiment, Pickett's division, of the Confederate States Army in the Civil War. He served three years and one month, until the close of the war.

Allen was a Democrat. Allen was elected as a member of the board of supervisors from 1893 to 1899. He was appointed by the county executive committee as a member of the Virginia House of Delegates, representing Pittsylvania County, in 1897 a few months before the election. He was then elected to the role. Allen put forward a resolution in the 1897–98 session for the oyster industry to pay revenue to the state of Virginia.

Allen farmed tobacco. In 1903, Allen organized an organization of tobacco growers in Pittsylvania County under the Inter-State Tobacco Growers' Protective Association of Virginia and North Carolina. He then served as its first president. He worked as a director of the Chatham Savings Bank.

== Personal life ==
Allen married Elizabeth Taylor on November 7, 1867. They had nine children, including James R., Henry E., Mrs. R. A. Terry, Mrs. O. C. Hoover, Mrs. B. L. Crowe, Raleigh C. and Mrs. T. B. Ruddick. He married Ora Graves on December 3, 1903. They had three children, including Dorothy and Clifton. Allen was a Presbyterian.

In 1905, his home in Spring Garden was destroyed by fire. Allen lived at Dry Fork in Pittsylvania County. He died on June 5, 1925, at his home.
