= Henry Allen Jr. =

Politician

Member of the Mississippi State Senate from the Calhoun and Yalobusha Counties district
- In office January 2, 1854 – March 1856
- Preceded by: G. S. Golliday (Yalobusha only)
- Succeeded by: C. H. Guy (both counties)

Personal details
- Born: 1823 or 1824
- Died: March 1856 (aged 32–33)
- Party: Democratic

Colonel Henry Allen Jr. (1823/24 - March 1856) was an American Democratic politician. He represented Calhoun and Yalobusha Counties in the Mississippi State Senate from 1854 to 1856.

== Biography ==
Henry Allen Jr. lived in Yalobusha County, Mississippi. In October 1850, a 25-year-old man enslaved by Allen or his family, named Sherrod, was being confined in Holly Springs, Mississippi. On December 13, 1851, Allen attended a meeting in Coffeeville, Mississippi, that considered expanding the New Orleans and Jackson Railroad northwards towards Holly Springs, Mississippi, and then to Tennessee. In 1853, Allen was elected to represent Calhoun and Yalobusha Counties in the Mississippi State Senate, and served in the 1854 and 1856 sessions. At the age of 30, Allen was the youngest member of the senate. In January 1854, he was the Secretary of a convention held to pay respects to Mississippi Governor Henry S. Foote. Allen died in March 1856, and the Legislature paid him tribute. He was survived by his widow and his parents. In November 1856, the Democratic Party nominated Major C. H. Guy to replace Allen in the Senate.
