= Frank Bedingfield =

English footballer

Personal information
- Date of birth: March qtr. 1877
- Place of birth: Sunderland
- Date of death: 3 November 1904 (aged 27)
- Place of death: South Africa
- Position: Centre-forward

Youth career
- South Shields Schools

Senior career*
Years	Team	Apps	(Gls)
- Great Yarmouth Town
- Rushden
1898–1899	Aston Villa	1	(1)
1899–1900	Queens Park Rangers	24	(17)
1900–1902	Portsmouth		
- * Club domestic league appearances and goals

Frank Bedingfield (1877 – 3 November 1904) was an English footballer who played at centre-forward for various clubs around the turn of the twentieth century, including a season in the Football League First Division with Aston Villa.

== Football career ==
Bedingfield was born in Sunderland, Tyne and Wear and represented South Shields Schools before moving to Great Yarmouth in Norfolk. After a spell with Rushden he joined Aston Villa in June 1898.

His only first-team appearance for Villa came on 26 November 1898 at Sheffield Wednesday. The referee was late arriving for the match at The Wednesday. After some deliberation, it was decided to start without him. Though he took over at half-time, the delay meant that darkness fell with 10 minutes left to play. Bedingfield scored the equalizer for Villa a minute after Tommy Crawshaw had given Wednesday the lead on 20 minutes. After two goals from Willie Dryburgh, Wednesday were 3–1 up when the referee Arthur Scragg called a halt on 79 minutes because of the failing light. The Football League ruled that the match had to be finished so the remaining eleven minutes of the match were played on 13 March 1899, when Bedingfield was replaced by Billy Garraty. Despite Villa's best efforts, they were unable to score but instead Fred Richards managed to scramble another goal for Wednesday in the final minute. Although Wednesday won this match, they were relegated at the end of the season while Villa were champions.

Bedingfield left Villa in August 1899 to join Queens Park Rangers of the Southern League. In his one year at Kensal Rise, Bedingfield was the club's top scorer with 21 goals in all competitions. His goals included one against Wolverhampton Wanderers of the First Division in the FA Cup First Round replay. The goal came in extra time after a goalless 90 minutes, when he burst past the Wolves back line two minutes into the second period to slam the ball home past Tom Baddeley in the Wolves' goal. In the Second Round, Q.P.R. met fellow Southern League club Millwall Athletic and lost 2–0.

Bedingfield moved to Portsmouth, another Southern League club, in the summer of 1900, where he was to remain for two years before dropping out of professional football.

== Later life ==
After ceasing his football career, Bedingfield emigrated to South Africa where he died on 3 November 1904, aged 27.

== Bibliography ==
- Collett, Mike (2003). The Complete Record of the FA Cup. Sports Books. ISBN 1-899807-19-5.
- Joyce, Michael (2004). Football League Players' Records 1888 to 1939. Nottingham: Tony Brown. ISBN 1-899468-67-6.
