= William Whiting (footballer) =

English footballer

Personal information
- Full name: William Whiting
- Date of birth: Not known
- Place of birth: Southampton, England
- Date of death: Not known
- Position: Half-back

Youth career
- Fitzhugh Rovers

Senior career*
Years	Team	Apps	(Gls)
1901–1907	Southampton	4	(0)
1907–1908	Salisbury City		
1908–1910	Eastleigh Athletic		
1910–19??	Southampton Wanderers		
- * Club domestic league appearances and goals

William Whiting was an English footballer who played as a half-back for Southampton in the 1900s, before becoming a referee.

== Football career ==
Whiting played football as an amateur for Fitzhugh Rovers before joining Southampton of the Southern League in 1901. In his six years at the "Saints", he only made four first-team appearances but in excess of 200 appearances for the reserves.

His first-team debut came when he replaced the injured Samuel Meston at right-half in a 4–1 victory over Kettering Town on 15 February 1902. He made two first-team appearances in the 1902–03 season, with his final appearance in the Southern League coming on 10 April 1905.

In 1905, he was a member of the Southampton Reserves team which won the Hampshire Senior Cup.

He left Southampton in the summer of 1907 to join Salisbury City where he spent a season, before joining Eastleigh Athletic.

== Career as a referee ==
After the First World War, Whiting became a referee in Southampton, and was promoted to the Southern League list in September 1921.
