= Harry W. Allen =

American entomologist

Harry Willis Allen
- Born: 1892
- Died: 1981 (aged 88–89)
- Known for: World's authority on wasps
- Scientific career
- Fields: entomologist

Harry Willis Allen (1892-1981) was an entomologist involved with the United States Department of Agriculture. He was the president of the American Entomological Society, and is considered a world authority on wasps.

== Bibliography ==
- North American species of two-winged flies belonging to the tribe Miltogrammini, Volume 68 of Proceedings of the United States National Museum. [Offprint]. Ohio State University, 1926.
- A revision of Neotiphia Malloch and Krombeinia Pate: (Hymenoptera, Tiphidae) (co-authored with Karl V. Krombein). Published in 1964.
- Redescriptions of Types of Tiphiinae from Asia, Africa, Oceania in the British Museum (NH) and at Oxford University. American Entomological Society, 1969.
- A Monographic Study of the Subfamily Tiphiinae Hymenoptera: Tiphiidae of South America, Volume 113 of Smithsonian Contributions to zoology. Smithsonian Inst. Press, 1972.
- The Genus Tiphia of the Indian Subcontinent; Technical Bulletin No. 1509, Agricultural Research Service. United States Department of Agriculture, Washington, D.C. Issued July 1975.
