= Albert Brown (footballer, born 1879) =

English footballer

Personal information
- Full name: Albert Frederick Brown
- Date of birth: 1 April 1879
- Place of birth: Austrey, Warwickshire, England
- Date of death: 6 April 1955 (aged 76)
- Place of death: Birmingham, England
- Height: 5 ft 11 in (1.80 m)
- Position: Striker

Youth career
- 18??–18??: Atherstone Star

Senior career*
Years	Team	Apps	(Gls)
18??–1898	Tamworth	?	(?)
1898–1901	Aston Villa	2	(2)
1901–1902	Southampton	26	(25)
1902–1904	Queens Park Rangers	30	(11)
1904–1905	Preston North End	22	(7)
1905–1906	Blackpool	3	(0)
- * Club domestic league appearances and goals

Albert Frederick Brown (1 April 1879 – 6 April 1955) was an English professional footballer who scored a goal in the 1902 FA Cup Final for Southampton, and also scored a record seven goals in one match.

== Playing career ==
Brown was born in Austrey, near Tamworth, England and started his career with the local Tamworth club, before joining Aston Villa in February 1898. He only made two first-team appearances for Villa in the 1900–01 season (in which he scored two goals) before moving (along with Tommy Bowman) to Southampton in May 1901.

Brown was reputed to be the fastest sprinter in English football and was known as the "Tamworth Sprinter". His career at Southampton got off to a slow start, scoring only once in his first three games before injury forced him to miss three games in October/November 1901. On his return from injury, he started to score more freely and by Christmas he had scored seven goals. In his next game he doubled his tally for the season as he scored a club record seven goals in a match against Northampton Town at The Dell on 28 December 1901. His first goal came almost straight from the kick-off and within five minutes he had completed his hat trick. By half time Saints were 7–0 up, with Brown contributing four. He added three more in the second half as Saints completed the rout, winning 11–0 (the other goals came from Sam Meston (2), Fred Harrison and Archie Turner).

He finished the 1901–02 season having scored 25 league goals from 25 games, as Saints ended the season in third place in the Southern League. He also made eight appearances in the FA Cup, scoring four times including Saints' goal in the replay of the final on 28 April 1902, as Saints went down 2–1 to Sheffield United.

During the summer of 1902, he sustained a serious injury which lost him his place in the starting line-up to John Fraser. Brown only made one further appearance for Southampton, before being sold to Queens Park Rangers in October 1902.

After two seasons with QPR, he moved on to Preston North End in May 1904 and then to Blackpool in March 1906, where he finished his career.

== Honours ==
Southampton

- FA Cup finalist: 1902

== Bibliography ==
- Holley, Duncan; Chalk, Gary (1992). The Alphabet of the Saints. ACL & Polar Publishing. ISBN 0-9514862-3-3.
- Chalk, Gary; Holley, Duncan (1987). Saints - A complete record. Breedon Books. ISBN 0-907969-22-4.
- Bull, David; Brunskell, Bob (2000). Match of the Millennium. Hagiology Publishing. ISBN 0-9534474-1-3.
