= Tom Kirkham =

British football referee

Thomas Kirkham was an English football referee.

In 1894 he officiated (most of) the 'Game of three halves' between Sunderland and Derby County on the opening day of the Football League First Division season, instructing that the full match should be played after one half had already been completed in his absence due to missing a train.

At the end of the first match in the 1902 Cup Final between Sheffield United and Southampton, United's goalkeeper William Foulke, unhappy with one of his decisions, left his dressing room unclothed and pursued Kirkham, who took refuge in a broom cupboard. Foulke had to be stopped by a group of FA officials from wrenching the cupboard door from its hinges to reach the referee.

Kirkham also refereed the replay, which Sheffield United won 2–1.

He also refereed the international match between Scotland and Ireland on 21 March 1903, followed by the matches between Scotland and Wales on 12 March 1904 and between Scotland and Ireland on 18 March 1905.

He is often confused with Fred Kirkham (from Preston) who refereed the 1906 FA Cup Final.
