= 1901–02 Southern Football League =

The 1901–02 season was the eighth in the history of the Southern League. Portsmouth were Division One champions for the first time. No clubs applied for election to the Football League.

== Division One ==
Southern Football League Division One
- Season: 1901–02
- Champions: Portsmouth (1st title)
- Promoted: none
- Relegated: none
- Matches: 240
- Goals: 712 (2.97 per match)

A total of 16 teams contest the division, including 13 sides from previous season and three new teams.

Team promoted from Division Two:

- Brentford

Teams elected from Midland League:

- Northampton Town
- Wellingborough

Pos	Team	Pld	W	D	L	GF	GA	GR	Pts	Qualification
1	Portsmouth	30	20	7	3	67	24	2.792	47	
2	Tottenham Hotspur	30	18	6	6	61	22	2.773	42	
3	Southampton	30	18	6	6	71	28	2.536	42	
4	West Ham United	30	17	6	7	45	28	1.607	40	
5	Reading	30	16	7	7	57	24	2.375	39	
6	Millwall Athletic	30	13	6	11	46	31	1.484	32	
7	Luton Town	30	11	10	9	31	36	0.861	32	
8	Kettering	30	12	5	13	44	39	1.128	29	
9	Bristol Rovers	30	12	5	13	43	39	1.103	29	
10	New Brompton	30	10	7	13	39	38	1.026	27	
11	Northampton Town	30	11	5	14	53	65	0.815	27	
12	Queens Park Rangers	30	9	6	15	34	55	0.618	24	
13	Watford	30	9	4	17	36	58	0.621	22	
14	Wellingborough	30	9	3	18	34	72	0.472	21	
15	Brentford	30	7	6	17	34	61	0.557	20	Relegation test matches
16	Swindon Town	30	2	3	25	17	92	0.185	7	Relegation test matches

Source: rsssf.com
Rules for classification: The system of using goal average to separate two teams tied on points was used until the 1976-77 season. The points system: 2 points for a win, 1 point for a draw and 0 points for losing.

== Division Two ==
Southern Football League Division Two
- Season: 1901–02
- Champions: Fulham
- Promoted: none
- Relegated: West Hampstead (resigned); Shepherds Bush (resigned); Maidenhead (resigned)
- Matches: 72
- Goals: 315 (4.38 per match)

A total of nine teams contest the division, including 7 sides from previous season and two new teams.

Newly elected teams:

- Brighton & Hove Albion
- West Hampstead.

Pos	Team	Pld	W	D	L	GF	GA	GR	Pts	Qualification
1	Fulham	16	13	0	3	51	19	2.684	26	Promotion test matches
2	Grays United	16	12	1	3	49	14	3.500	25	Promotion test matches
3	Brighton & Hove Albion	16	11	0	5	34	17	2.000	22	
4	Wycombe Wanderers	16	7	3	6	36	30	1.200	17	
5	West Hampstead	16	6	4	6	39	29	1.345	16	Left league at end of season
6	Shepherds Bush	16	6	1	9	31	31	1.000	13	Left league at end of season
7	Southall	16	5	2	9	28	52	0.538	12	
8	Maidenhead	16	3	1	12	23	59	0.390	7	Left league at end of season
9	Chesham Town	16	2	2	12	24	64	0.375	6	

Source: rsssf.com
Rules for classification: The system of using goal average to separate two teams tied on points was used until the 1976-77 season. The points system: 2 points for a win, 1 point for a draw and 0 points for losing.

== Promotion-relegation test matches ==
At the end of the season, test matches were held between the bottom two clubs in Division One and the top two clubs in Division Two. Swindon Town beat Fulham 3–0 to maintain their place in Division One. The other match between Brentford and Grays United ended in a 1–1 draw, but for a second successive season Grays were refused promotion after refusing to play extra time.

Division One clubs	v	Division Two clubs

30 April 1902

Swindon Town	3 – 0	Fulham

Elm Park, Reading
28 April 1902

Brentford	1 – 1	Grays United

Memorial Grounds, West Ham
