= 1908–09 Manchester United F.C. season =

English football club season

Manchester United
1908–09 season
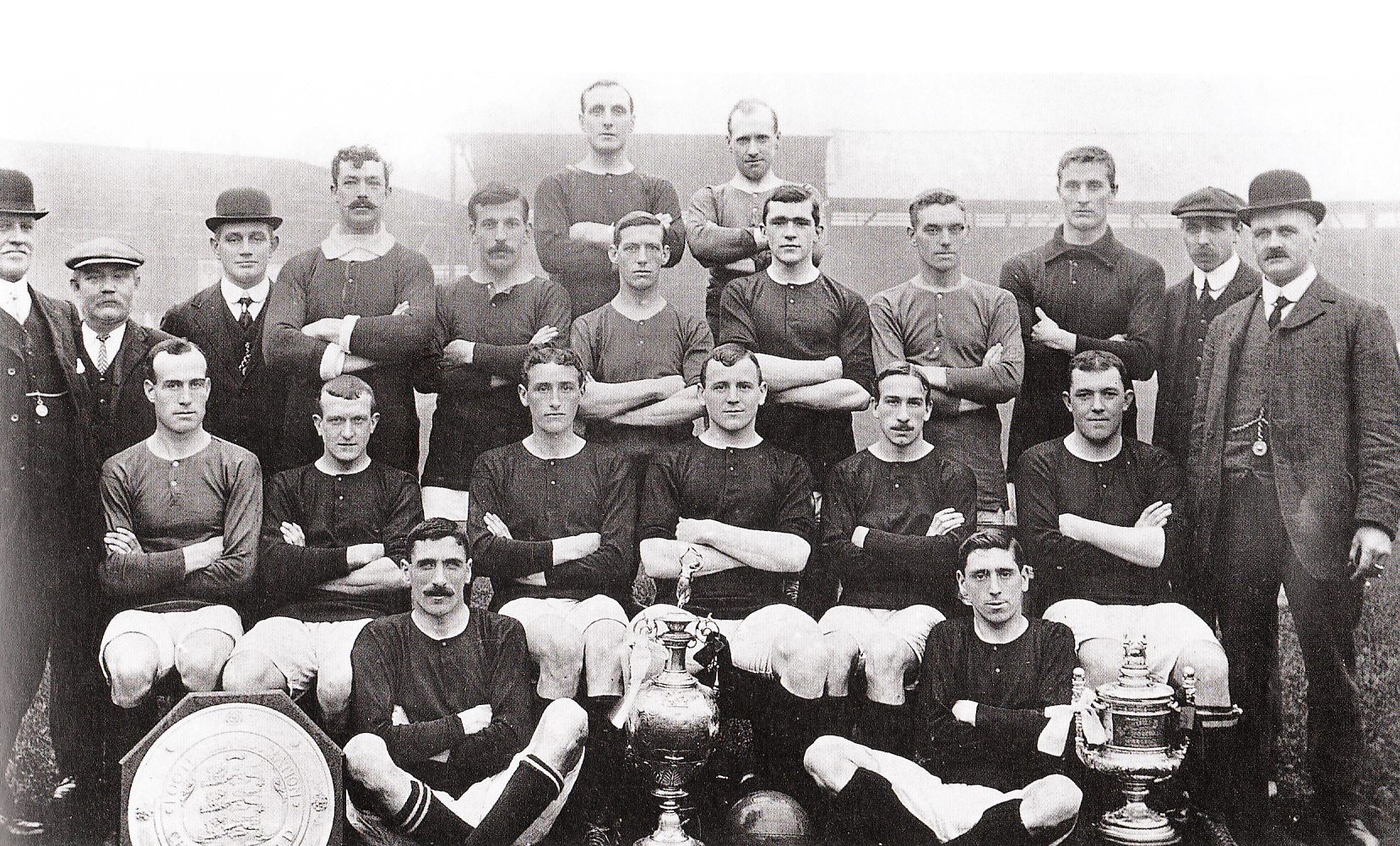
- The Manchester United FC team of 1909 posing with their trophies won, they are: FA Charity Shield, the Football League (First Division, won in 1907–08) and the FA Cup
- Chairman: John Henry Davies
- Manager: Ernest Mangnall
- Stadium: Bank Street Ground
- First Division: 13th
- FA Cup: Winners
- Top goalscorer: League: Jimmy Turnbull (17); All: Jimmy Turnbull (22)
- Highest home attendance: 40,000 vs Newcastle United (26 December 1908); 40,000 vs Manchester City (23 January 1909)
- Lowest home attendance: 8,000 vs Everton (10 April 1909)
- Average home league attendance: 19,183
Home colours	Away colours	Third colours

The 1908–09 season was Manchester United's 17th season in the Football League and fourth in the First Division.

== First Division ==
Date	Opponents	H / A	Result F–A	Scorers	Attendance
5 September 1908	Preston North End	A	3–0	J. Turnbull (2), Halse	18,000
7 September 1908	Bury	H	2–1	J. Turnbull (2)	16,000
12 September 1908	Middlesbrough	H	6–3	J. Turnbull (4), Halse, Wall	25,000
19 September 1908	Manchester City	A	2–1	Halse, J. Turnbull	40,000
26 September 1908	Liverpool	H	3–2	Halse (2), J. Turnbull	25,000
3 October 1908	Bury	A	2–2	Halse, Wall	25,000
10 October 1908	Sheffield United	H	2–1	Bell (2)	14,000
17 October 1908	Aston Villa	A	1–3	Halse	40,000
24 October 1908	Nottingham Forest	H	2–2	S. Turnbull (2)	20,000
31 October 1908	Sunderland	A	1–6	S. Turnbull	30,000
7 November 1908	Chelsea	H	0–1		15,000
14 November 1908	Blackburn Rovers	A	3–1	Halse, J. Turnbull, Wall	25,000
21 November 1908	Bradford City	H	2–0	Picken, Wall	15,000
28 November 1908	Sheffield Wednesday	H	3–1	Halse, J. Turnbull, Wall	20,000
5 December 1908	Everton	A	2–3	Bannister, Halse	35,000
12 December 1908	Leicester Fosse	H	4–2	Wall (3), Picken	10,000
19 December 1908	Woolwich Arsenal	A	1–0	Halse	10,000
25 December 1908	Newcastle United	A	1–2	Wall	35,000
26 December 1908	Newcastle United	H	1–0	Halse	40,000
1 January 1909	Notts County	H	4–3	Halse (2), Roberts, S. Turnbull	15,000
2 January 1909	Preston North End	H	0–2		18,000
9 January 1909	Middlesbrough	A	0–5		15,000
23 January 1909	Manchester City	H	3–1	Livingstone (2), Wall	40,000
30 January 1909	Liverpool	A	1–3	S. Turnbull	30,000
13 February 1909	Sheffield United	A	0–0		12,000
27 February 1909	Nottingham Forest	A	0–2		7,000
13 March 1909	Chelsea	A	1–1	Wall	30,000
15 March 1909	Sunderland	H	2–2	Payne, J. Turnbull	10,000
20 March 1909	Blackburn Rovers	H	0–3		11,000
31 March 1909	Aston Villa	H	0–2		10,000
3 April 1909	Sheffield Wednesday	A	0–2		15,000
9 April 1909	Bristol City	H	0–1		18,000
10 April 1909	Everton	H	2–2	J. Turnbull (2)	8,000
12 April 1909	Bristol City	A	0–0		18,000
13 April 1909	Notts County	A	1–0	Livingstone	7,000
17 April 1909	Leicester Fosse	A	2–3	J. Turnbull, Wall	8,000
27 April 1909	Woolwich Arsenal	H	1–4	J. Turnbull	10,000
29 April 1909	Bradford City	A	0–1		30,000

Pos	Team	Pld	W	D	L	GF	GA	GAv	Pts
11	Chelsea	38	14	9	15	56	61	0.918	37
12	Sheffield United	38	14	9	15	51	59	0.864	37
13	Manchester United	38	15	7	16	58	68	0.853	37
14	Nottingham Forest	38	14	8	16	66	57	1.158	36
15	Notts County	38	14	8	16	51	48	1.063	36

Source: World Football
Rules for classification: 1) Points; 2) Goal average; 3) Goals scored

== FA Cup ==
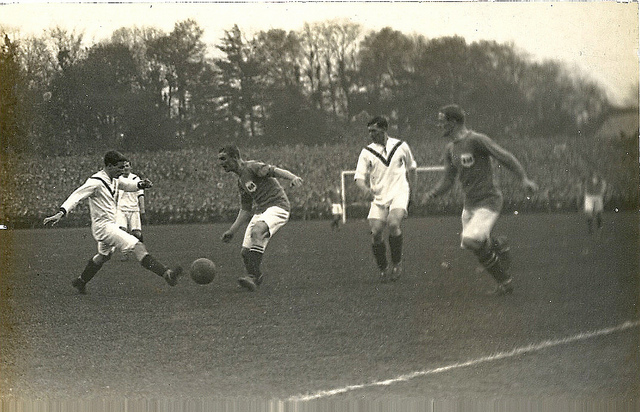
Action from the 1909 FA Cup final; United in white strip.

Date	Round	Opponents	H / A	Result F–A	Scorers	Attendance
16 January 1909	First Round	Brighton & Hove Albion	H	1–0	Halse	8,300
6 February 1909	Second Round	Everton	H	1–0	Halse	35,217
20 February 1909	Third Round	Blackburn Rovers	H	6–1	S. Turnbull (3), J. Turnbull (3)	38,500
5 March 1909	Fourth Round	Burnley	A	A–A	Match abandoned at 0–1	
10 March 1909	Fourth Round	Burnley	A	3–2	J. Turnbull (2), Halse	16,850
27 March 1909	Semi-Final	Newcastle United	N	1–0	Halse	40,118
24 April 1909	Final	Bristol City	N	1–0	S. Turnbull	71,401

== Squad statistics ==
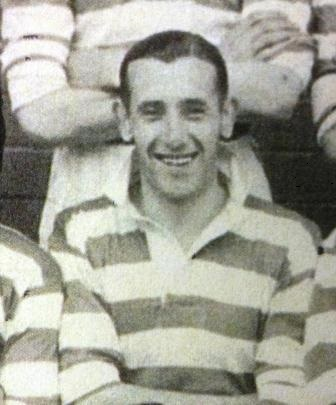
Jimmy Turnbull was the club's top scorer with 22 goals.

Pos.	Name	League		FA Cup		Total	
Pos.	Name	Apps	Goals	Apps	Goals	Apps	Goals
GK	(England) Harry Moger	36	0	6	0	42	0
GK	(England) Tom Wilcox	2	0	0	0	2	0
FB	(England) Herbert Burgess	4	0	0	0	4	0
FB	(England) Tony Donnelly	1	0	0	0	1	0
FB	(England) Vince Hayes	22	0	6	0	28	0
FB	(England) Dick Holden	2	0	0	0	2	0
FB	(England) Aaron Hulme	3	0	0	0	3	0
FB	(England) Oscar Linkson	10	0	0	0	10	0
FB	(England) George Stacey	32	0	6	0	38	0
HB	(Scotland) Alex Bell	20	2	6	0	26	2
HB	(England) Joe Curry	8	0	0	0	8	0
HB	(Scotland) Alex Downie	23	0	0	0	23	0
HB	(England) Dick Duckworth	33	0	6	0	39	0
HB	(England) Harold Hardman	4	0	0	0	4	0
HB	(England) John McGillivray	2	0	0	0	2	0
HB	(England) Charlie Roberts	27	1	6	0	33	1
HB	(England) Ernest Thomson	1	0	0	0	1	0
FW	(England) Jimmy Bannister	16	1	0	0	16	1
FW	(England) Bill Berry	1	0	0	0	1	0
FW	(Scotland) David Christie	2	0	0	0	2	0
FW	(England) Joe Ford	4	0	0	0	4	0
FW	(England) Harold Halse	29	14	6	4	35	18
FW	(Scotland) George Livingstone	11	3	2	0	13	3
FW	(Wales) Billy Meredith	34	0	4	0	38	0
FW	(England) Ernest Payne	2	1	0	0	2	1
FW	(Scotland) Jack Picken	13	3	0	0	13	3
FW	(Scotland) Jack Quin	1	0	0	0	1	0
FW	(Scotland) Jimmy Turnbull	22	17	6	5	28	22
FW	(Scotland) Sandy Turnbull	19	5	6	4	25	9
FW	(England) George Wall	34	11	6	0	40	11
