= 1920–21 Rochdale A.F.C. season =

English football club season

Rochdale
1920–21 season
- Stadium: Spotland Stadium
- Central League: 10th
- FA Cup: First Round
- Top goalscorer: League: Harry Dennison (22); All: Harry Dennison (23)

The 1920–21 season was Rochdale A.F.C.'s 14th in existence where they competed in The F.A. Cup for the 9th time and reached the first round proper. It was also the club's final season in the Central League before election to the Third Division North.

== Squad Statistics ==
=== Appearances and goals ===
No.	Pos	Nat	Player	Total		Central League		F.A. Cup	
No.	Pos	Nat	Player	Apps	Goals	Apps	Goals	Apps	Goals
	GK		H. Thorpe	6	0	6	0	0	0
	DF	(England) ENG	Jack Yarwood	44	1	39	1	5	0
	DF		Billy Bamford	1	0	1	0	0	0
	MF	(England) ENG	Jack Broster	41	2	37	2	4	0
	MF		J. Davie	24	0	22	0	2	0
	MF		W. Bradshaw	5	0	5	0	0	0
	MF	(England) ENG	William Clifton	23	4	20	4	3	0
	FW	(England) ENG	Tom Byrom	22	10	18	9	4	1
	FW		F. Braithwaite	1	0	1	0	0	0
	MF	(England) ENG	Harry Mallalieu	20	3	19	3	1	0
	FW	(England) ENG	Ted Connor	32	2	28	1	4	1
	DF	(England) ENG	Fred Baines	36	0	31	0	5	0
	FW	(England) ENG	Harry Dennison	34	23	29	22	5	1
	FW		W. Ward	10	1	10	1	0	0
	GK		Tom McDonald	4	0	4	0	0	0
	DF		J. Taylor	5	0	5	0	0	0
	MF	(England) ENG	Jack Hill	11	0	11	0	0	0
	GK	(England) ENG	Jimmy Crabtree	35	0	30	0	5	0
	DF	(England) ENG	Tom Bamford	2	0	2	0	0	0
	FW	(England) ENG	Sid Hoad	23	3	22	3	1	0
	DF	(England) ENG	Jimmy Nuttall	39	0	34	0	5	0
	DF	(England) ENG	Joe Wilson	24	1	19	1	5	0
	FW		E. Lowe	23	11	18	9	5	2
	MF		Tom Wilson	2	0	2	0	0	0
	FW		L. Turner	5	0	4	0	1	0
	FW		E. Tansey	2	0	2	0	0	0
	MF	(England) ENG	Joe Herbert	8	4	8	4	0	0
	FW	(England) ENG	Arthur Collinge	13	2	13	2	0	0
	FW	(England) ENG	Bob Sandiford	7	1	7	1	0	0
	DF	(England) ENG	Joseph Barnes	7	0	7	0	0	0
	DF	(England) ENG	Tom Nuttall	1	0	1	0	0	0
	FW		Bert Thornley	2	0	2	0	0	0
	GK		Lund/Lunn	1	0	1	0	0	0
	FW		Clutton	1	0	1	0	0	0
	GK		Stansfield	1	0	1	0	0	0
	FW		Bussey/Bussy	1	0	1	0	0	0
	DF		J.H. Doxford	0	0	0	0	0	0
	DF		A. Walker	0	0	0	0	0	0
	FW		J. Crompton	0	0	0	0	0	0
	DF		E. Fuller	0	0	0	0	0	0

Squad Statistics (Non-Competitive)

=== Appearances and goals (non-competitive) ===
No.	Pos	Nat	Player	Total		Manc. Cup		Lancs Jnr Cup		Friendlies	
No.	Pos	Nat	Player	Apps	Goals	Apps	Goals	Apps	Goals	Apps	Goals
	GK		H. Thorpe	0	0	0	0	0	0	0	0
	DF	(England) ENG	Jack Yarwood	6	0	4	0	0	0	2	0
	DF		Billy Bamford	0	0	0	0	0	0	0	0
	MF	(England) ENG	Jack Broster	6	0	4	0	0	0	2	0
	MF		J. Davie	3	0	0	0	1	0	2	0
	MF		W. Bradshaw	0	0	0	0	0	0	0	0
	MF	(England) ENG	William Clifton	3	1	3	1	0	0	0	0
	FW	(England) ENG	Tom Byrom	0	0	0	0	0	0	0	0
	FW		F. Braithwaite	0	0	0	0	0	0	0	0
	MF	(England) ENG	Harry Mallalieu	4	0	3	0	1	0	0	0
	FW	(England) ENG	Ted Connor	4	0	3	0	0	0	1	0
	DF	(England) ENG	Fred Baines	3	0	3	0	0	0	0	0
	FW	(England) ENG	Harry Dennison	6	8	4	4	0	0	2	4
	FW		W. Ward	1	0	0	0	1	0	0	0
	GK		Tom McDonald	3	0	1	0	1	0	1	0
	DF		J. Taylor	1	0	0	0	1	0	0	0
	MF	(England) ENG	Jack Hill	6	0	5	0	1	0	0	0
	GK	(England) ENG	Jimmy Crabtree	5	0	4	0	0	0	1	0
	DF	(England) ENG	Tom Bamford	0	0	0	0	0	0	0	0
	FW	(England) ENG	Sid Hoad	3	1	1	0	0	0	2	1
	DF	(England) ENG	Jimmy Nuttall	6	0	5	0	0	0	1	0
	DF	(England) ENG	Joe Wilson	0	0	0	0	0	0	0	0
	FW		E. Lowe	3	0	2	0	0	0	1	0
	MF		Tom Wilson	3	1	0	0	1	1	2	0
	FW		L. Turner	1	0	0	0	1	0	0	0
	FW		E. Tansey	0	0	0	0	0	0	0	0
	MF	(England) ENG	Joe Herbert	2	2	0	0	0	0	2	2
	FW	(England) ENG	Arthur Collinge	7	5	5	4	0	0	2	1
	FW	(England) ENG	Bob Sandiford	5	3	5	3	0	0	0	0
	DF	(England) ENG	Joseph Barnes	3	0	3	0	0	0	0	0
	DF	(England) ENG	Tom Nuttall	0	0	0	0	0	0	0	0
	FW		Bert Thornley	0	0	0	0	0	0	0	0
	GK		Lund/Lunn	0	0	0	0	0	0	0	0
	FW		Clutton	0	0	0	0	0	0	0	0
	GK		Stansfield	0	0	0	0	0	0	0	0
	FW		Bussey/Bussy	1	0	0	0	0	0	1	0
	DF		J.H. Doxford	1	0	0	0	1	0	0	0
	DF		A. Walker	1	0	0	0	1	0	0	0
	FW		J. Crompton	1	0	0	0	1	0	0	0
	DF		E. Fuller	1	0	0	0	0	0	1	0

== Friendlies ==
12 February 1921 Friendly	Darlington	3–3	Rochdale	Darlington
	Goal		Dennison; Collinge	Stadium: Feethams

19 February 1921 Friendly	Oldham Athletic	5–5	Rochdale	Oldham
	Goal		Hoad; Dennison; Herbert	Stadium: Boundary Park

== Competitions ==
=== Central League ===
28 August 1920 1	Rochdale	1–3	Nelson	Rochdale
	Byrom		Goal	Stadium: Spotland Stadium; Attendance: 5000

4 September 1920 2	Nelson	1–2	Rochdale	Nelson
	Goal		Dennison; Clifton	Stadium: Seedhill

7 September 1920 3	Rochdale	4–1	Stalybridge Celtic	Rochdale
	Byrom (pen.); Dennison		Goal	Stadium: Spotland Stadium; Attendance: 4000

11 September 1920 4	Rochdale	0–1	Burnley Reserves	Rochdale
			Goal	Stadium: Spotland Stadium; Attendance: 4500

18 September 1920 5	Burnley Reserves	3–4	Rochdale	Burnley
	Goal		Dennison; Byrom; Clifton; Ward	Stadium: Turf Moor

20 September 1920 6	Stalybridge Celtic	3–0	Rochdale	Stalybridge
	Goal			Stadium: Bower Fold

25 September 1920 7	Rochdale	3–0	Southport	Rochdale
	Dennison; Hoad			Stadium: Spotland Stadium; Attendance: 5000

2 October 1920 8	Southport	5–0	Rochdale	Southport
	Goal			Stadium: Haig Avenue

9 October 1920 9	Bradford City Reserves	0–3	Rochdale	Bradford
			Byrom (pen.); Lowe; Dennison	Stadium: Valley Parade; Attendance: 4000

16 October 1920 10	Rochdale	2–3	Bradford City Reserves	Rochdale
	Byrom (pen.); Dennison		Goal	Stadium: Spotland Stadium

23 October 1920 11	Bolton Wanderers Reserves	1–2	Rochdale	Bolton
	Goal		Clifton; Byrom	Stadium: Burnden Park; Attendance: 10000

26 October 1920 12	Rochdale	1–2	Bolton Wanderers Reserves	Rochdale
	Hoad		Goal	Stadium: Spotland Stadium; Attendance: 4500

6 November 1920 13	Tranmere Rovers	6–1	Rochdale	Birkenhead
	Goal		Byrom	Stadium: Prenton Park; Attendance: 8000

13 November 1920 14	Rochdale	3–1	Tranmere Rovers	Rochdale
	Connor; Lowe		Goal	Stadium: Spotland Stadium; Attendance: 3000

17 November 1920 15	Huddersfield Town Reserves	1–3	Rochdale	Huddersfield
	Goal		Lowe; Hoad	Stadium: Leeds Road; Attendance: 500

23 November 1920 16	Blackpool Reserves	2–1	Rochdale	Blackpool
	Goal		Byrom	Stadium: Bloomfield Road

11 December 1920 17	Rochdale	3–1	Everton Reserves	Rochdale
	Dennison; Lowe		Goal	Stadium: Spotland Stadium; Attendance: 4000

25 December 1920 18	Rochdale	0–2	Oldham Athletic Reserves	Rochdale
			Goal	Stadium: Spotland Stadium; Attendance: 5000

27 December 1920 19	Oldham Athletic Reserves	0–0	Rochdale	Oldham
				Stadium: Boundary Park; Attendance: 4000

1 January 1921 20	Blackburn Rovers	2–2	Rochdale	Blackburn
	Goal		Lowe; Broster	Stadium: Ewood Park

15 January 1921 21	Rochdale	2–1	Preston North End Reserves	Rochdale
	Broster; J. Wilson		Goal	Stadium: Spotland Stadium; Attendance: 3000

18 January 1921 22	Rochdale	0–3	Huddersfield Town Reserves	Rochdale
			Goal	Stadium: Spotland Stadium; Attendance: 1500

22 January 1921 23	Preston North End Reserves	2–0	Rochdale	Preston
	Goal			Stadium: Deepdale; Attendance: 4000

29 January 1921 24	Crewe Alexandra	3–0	Rochdale	Crewe
	Goal			Stadium: Gresty Road; Attendance: 6000

5 February 1921 25	Rochdale	5–1	Crewe Alexandra	Rochdale
	Lowe; Mallalieu; Dennison		Goal	Stadium: Spotland Stadium; Attendance: 4000

8 February 1921 26	Rochdale	1–1	Manchester City Reserves	Rochdale
	Mallalieu		Goal	Stadium: Spotland Stadium; Attendance: 4000

22 February 1921 27	Rochdale	1–1	Blackpool Reserves	Rochdale
	Herbert		Goal	Stadium: Spotland Stadium; Attendance: 4000

26 February 1921 28	Rochdale	2–1	Bury Reserves	Rochdale
	Mallalieu; Herbert		Goal	Stadium: Spotland Stadium; Attendance: 3000

5 March 1921 29	Bury Reserves	1–2	Rochdale	Bury
	Goal		Herbert; Yarwood	Stadium: Gigg Lane

8 March 1921 30	Rochdale	0–3	Blackburn Rovers	Rochdale
			Goal	Stadium: Spotland Stadium; Attendance: 2500

12 March 1921 31	Rochdale	3–1	Stockport County Reserves	Rochdale
	Clifton; Collinge; Dennison		Goal	Stadium: Spotland Stadium

19 March 1921 32	Stockport County Reserves	0–0	Rochdale	Stockport
				Stadium: Edgeley Park

26 March 1921 33	Manchester United Reserves	1–2	Rochdale	Manchester
	Goal		Dennison	Stadium: Old Trafford; Attendance: 6000

28 March 1921 34	Manchester City Reserves	2–0	Rochdale	Manchester
	Goal			Stadium: Hyde Road

2 April 1921 35	Rochdale	3–1	Manchester United Reserves	Rochdale
	Dennison		Goal	Stadium: Spotland Stadium; Attendance: 6000

11 April 1921 36	Aston Villa Reserves	5–0	Rochdale	Aston
	Goal			Stadium: Villa Park; Attendance: 4000

16 April 1921 37	Rochdale	1–0	Aston Villa Reserves	Rochdale
	Sandiford			Stadium: Spotland Stadium; Attendance: 5000

20 April 1921 38	Everton Reserves	1–0	Rochdale	Liverpool
	Goal			Stadium: Goodison Park; Attendance: 4000

23 April 1921 39	Liverpool Reserves	0–2	Rochdale	Liverpool
			Collinge; Dennison	Stadium: Anfield

30 April 1921 40	Rochdale	3–0	Liverpool Reserves	Rochdale
	Dennison			Stadium: Spotland Stadium; Attendance: 4000

2 May 1921 41	Port Vale Reserves	5–0	Rochdale	Stoke-on-Trent
	Goal			Stadium: Old Recreation Ground

7 May 1921 42	Rochdale	1–2	Port Vale Reserves	Rochdale
	Goal		Goal	Stadium: Spotland Stadium; Attendance: 2000

=== F.A. Cup ===
20 November 1920 Q4	Rochdale	1–0	Fleetwood	Rochdale
	Connor			Stadium: Spotland Stadium; Attendance: 3000

4 December 1920 Q5	Rochdale	1–0	Tranmere Rovers	Rochdale
	Dennison			Stadium: Spotland Stadium; Attendance: 3000

18 December 1920 Q6	Coventry City	1–1	Rochdale	Coventry
	Millard	Report	E. Lowe	Stadium: Highfield Road; Attendance: 18000

21 December 1920 Q6 Replay	Rochdale	2–1	Coventry City	Rochdale
	E. Lowe; Byrom	Report	Hanney	Stadium: Spotland Stadium; Attendance: 9000

8 January 1921 1	Plymouth Argyle	2–0	Rochdale	Plymouth
	Sheffield; Russell 77' (pen.)	Report		Stadium: Home Park; Attendance: 24287

=== Manchester Senior Cup ===
21 March 1921	Oldham Athletic	4–4	Rochdale	Oldham
	Goal		Collinge; Sandiford	Stadium: Boundary Park

4 April 1921	Rochdale	4–3	Oldham Athletic	Rochdale
	Dennison; Sandiford		Goal	Stadium: Spotland Stadium; Attendance: 2500

18 April 1921	Ashton National	1–1	Rochdale	Ashton-under-Lyne
	Goal		Collinge	Stadium: National Park; Attendance: 3000

25 April 1921	Rochdale	3–0	Ashton National	Rochdale
	Collinge; Dennison; Clifton			Stadium: Spotland Stadium; Attendance: 4000

5 May 1921 SF	Manchester United	2–0	Rochdale	Manchester
	Goal			Stadium: Old Trafford; Attendance: 1000

=== Lancashire Junior Cup ===
16 September 1920	Eccles United	3–1	Rochdale	Eccles
	Goal		T. Wilson	Stadium: ? Attendance: 5000
