= Arthur Whalley =

English footballer

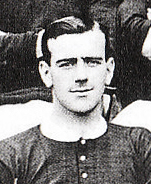

Personal information
- Full name: Arthur Whalley
- Date of birth: 17 February 1886
- Place of birth: Rainford, England
- Date of death: 23 November 1952 (aged 66)
- Place of death: Wythenshawe, England
- Position: Half back

Senior career*
Years	Team	Apps	(Gls)
1906–1907	Brynn Central		
1907–1908	Wigan Town		
1908–1909	Blackpool	6	(2)
1909–1920	Manchester United	97	(6)
1920–1921	Southend United	30	(5)
1921–1924	Charlton Athletic	88	(8)
1924–1925	Millwall	8	(0)
1926	Barrow	1	(0)
Total		229	(21)

International career
1913	Football League XI	1	(0)
- * Club domestic league appearances and goals

Arthur Whalley (17 February 1886 – 23 November 1952) was an English professional footballer who played as a half back in the Football League, most notably for Manchester United. He was nicknamed 'The Black Prince'.

== Career ==
Whalley played in the Football League for Blackpool, Manchester United, Southend United, Charlton Athletic, Millwall, Barrow and represented the Football League XI. He also played in non-League football for Brynn Central and Wigan Town. Whalley was one of eight players to be banned for life by the Football Association after a match-fixing scandal during the 1914–15 season, though in light of his war service, the ban was lifted in 1919.

== Personal life ==
Whalley served as a sergeant in the 2nd Football Battalion of the Middlesex Regiment during the First World War. He saw action at the battles of Flers-Courcelette, Le Transloy and Passchendaele. At Passchendaele, Whalley was seriously wounded in the head and leg and was evacuated to a hospital in Orpington, Kent. After retiring from football in 1927, Whalley worked as a bookmaker.

== Career statistics ==
Appearances and goals by club, season and competition
Club	Season	League			FA Cup		Total	
Club	Season	Division	Apps	Goals	Apps	Goals	Apps	Goals
Blackpool	1908–09	Second Division	6	2	1	1	7	3
Manchester United	1909–10	First Division	9	0	0	0	9	0
Manchester United	1910–11	First Division	15	0	0	0	15	0
Manchester United	1911–12	First Division	5	0	1	0	6	0
Manchester United	1912–13	First Division	26	4	5	0	31	4
Manchester United	1913–14	First Division	18	2	1	0	19	2
Manchester United	1914–15	First Division	1	0	0	0	1	0
Manchester United	1919–20	First Division	23	0	2	0	25	0
Manchester United	Total		97	6	9	0	106	6
Southend United	1920–21	Third Division	30	5	4	1	34	5
Charlton Athletic	1921–22	Third Division South	38	4	0	0	38	4
Charlton Athletic	1922–23	Third Division South	28	1	6	1	34	2
Charlton Athletic	1923–24	Third Division South	22	3	4	0	26	3
Charlton Athletic	Total		88	8	10	1	98	9
Millwall	1924–25	Third Division South	8	0	0	0	8	0
Barrow	1926–27	Third Division North	1	0	0	0	1	0
Total			230	21	24	3	254	24

== Honours ==
Manchester United

- Football League First Division: 1910–11
