= 1916–17 Manchester United F.C. season =

English football club season

Manchester United
1916–17 season
- Chairman: John Henry Davies
- Manager: Jack Robson
- Principal Tournament: 7th
- Subsidiary Tournament Group D: 1st
Home colours	Away colours

The 1916–17 season was Manchester United's second season in the non-competitive War League.

With the ongoing First World War, once again Manchester United played non-competitive war league football. In the principal tournament they contested the Lancashire Section, which was expanded to 16 teams to give a more complete 30-game season. In the subsidiary tournament they contested Group D of the Lancashire Section, with the groups reduced to four teams in size to complement the increased playing season of the Principal Tournament. However, none of these were considered to be competitive football, and thus their records are not recognised by the Football League.

On 8 August 1916, while fighting in France during the war, former United player Private Oscar Linkson went missing in the battle to seize Guillemont Station during the Battle of the Somme. His body was never recovered and he was recorded as missing presumed dead.

On 3 May 1917, Another United former player Sandy Turnbull was killed in France. Turnbull was killed in Arras while serving as a Lance Sergeant in the Eighth Battalion of the East Surrey Regiment of the British Army. His body was never found and he is commemorated on the Arras memorial.

== Lancashire Section Principal Tournament ==
Date	Opponents	H / A	Result F–A	Scorers	Attendance
2 September 1916	Port Vale	H	2–2	Woodcock (2)	
9 September 1916	Oldham Athletic	A	2–0	Armstrong, O'Connell	
16 September 1916	Preston North End	H	2–1	Woodcock (2)	
23 September 1916	Burnley	A	1–7	Armstrong	
30 September 1916	Blackpool	A	2–2	Woodcock (2)	
7 October 1916	Liverpool	H	0–0		
14 October 1916	Stockport County	A	0–1		
21 October 1916	Bury	H	3–1	Armstrong (2), Own goal	
28 October 1916	Stoke	A	0–3		
4 November 1916	Southport Central	H	1–0	Woodcock	
11 November 1916	Blackburn Rovers	A	2–1	Anderson, Woodcock	
18 November 1916	Manchester City	H	2–1	Anderson, Woodcock	
25 November 1916	Everton	A	2–3	Anderson, Woodcock	
2 December 1916	Rochdale	H	1–1	Anderson	
9 December 1916	Bolton Wanderers	A	1–5	Anderson	
23 December 1916	Oldham Athletic	H	3–2	Anderson (2), Ogden	
30 December 1916	Preston North End	A	2–3	Anderson, Woodcock	
6 January 1917	Burnley	H	3–1	Anderson (2), Woodcock	
13 January 1917	Blackpool	H	3–2	Woodcock (2), Crossley	
20 January 1917	Liverpool	A	3–3	Anderson (3)	
27 January 1917	Stockport County	H	0–1		
3 February 1917	Bury	A	1–1	Woodcock	
10 February 1917	Stoke	H	4–2	Woodcock (2), Ellis, Robinson	
17 February 1917	Southport Central	A	1–0	Ellis	
24 February 1917	Blackburn Rovers	H	1–0	Anderson	
3 March 1917	Manchester City	A	0–1		
10 March 1917	Everton	H	0–2		
17 March 1917	Rochdale	A	0–2		
24 March 1917	Bolton Wanderers	H	6–3	Woodcock (3), Anderson (2), Hilditch	
6 April 1917	Port Vale	A	0–3		

Pos	Team	Pld	W	D	L	GF	GA	GAv	Pts
6	Burnley	30	15	4	11	73	56	1.304	34
7	Manchester United	30	13	6	11	48	54	0.889	32
8	Rochdale	30	12	5	13	47	54	0.870	29

== Lancashire Section Subsidiary Tournament Group D ==
Date	Opponents	H / A	Result F–A	Scorers	Attendance
31 March 1917	Stoke	A	1–2	Ellis	
7 April 1917	Manchester City	H	5–1	Anderson (3), Woodcock (2)	
9 April 1917	Port Vale	H	5–1	Anderson (3), Travis (2)	
14 April 1917	Stoke	H	1–0	Woodcock	
21 April 1917	Manchester City	A	1–0	Anderson	
28 April 1917	Port Vale	A	2–5	McMenemy, Woodcock	

Pos	Team	Pld	W	D	L	GF	GA	GAv	Pts
1	Manchester United	6	4	0	2	15	9	1.667	8
2	Stoke	6	3	0	3	11	6	1.833	6
3	Port Vale	6	2	1	3	9	12	0.750	5
4	Manchester City	6	2	1	3	3	11	0.273	5
