= 1919–20 Manchester United F.C. season =

English football club season

Manchester United
1919–20 season
- Chairman: John Henry Davies
- Manager: Jack Robson
- First Division: 12th
- FA Cup: Second Round
- Top goalscorer: League: Joe Spence (14); All: Joe Spence (14)
- Highest home attendance: 45,000 vs Liverpool (26 December 1919)
- Lowest home attendance: 13,000 vs The Wednesday (1 September 1919)
| Home colours | Away colours |

The 1919–20 season was Manchester United's 24th season in the Football League, ninth in the First Division, and first season back in the Football League and the FA Cup after the cancellation of competitive league football during First World War.

Prior to the start of the season, the Football League expanded the number of teams taking part in the league to 22 teams, giving Manchester United their first taste of a 42-match league season.

== First Division ==
| Date | Opponents | H / A | Result F–A | Scorers | Attendance |
|---|---|---|---|---|---|
| 30 August 1919 | Derby County | A | 1–1 | Woodcock | 12,000 |
| 1 September 1919 | The Wednesday | H | 0–0 | | 13,000 |
| 6 September 1919 | Derby County | H | 0–2 | | 15,000 |
| 8 September 1919 | The Wednesday | A | 3–1 | Meehan, Spence, Woodcock | 10,000 |
| 13 September 1919 | Preston North End | A | 3–2 | Spence (2), Meehan | 15,000 |
| 20 September 1919 | Preston North End | H | 5–1 | Spence (2), Woodcock (2), Montgomery | 18,000 |
| 27 September 1919 | Middlesbrough | A | 1–1 | Woodcock | 20,000 |
| 4 October 1919 | Middlesbrough | H | 1–1 | Woodcock | 28,000 |
| 11 October 1919 | Manchester City | A | 3–3 | Hodge, Hopkin, Spence | 30,000 |
| 18 October 1919 | Manchester City | H | 1–0 | Spence | 40,000 |
| 25 October 1919 | Sheffield United | A | 2–2 | Hopkin, Woodcock | 18,000 |
| 1 November 1919 | Sheffield United | H | 3–0 | Hodges, Spence, Woodcock | 24,500 |
| 8 November 1919 | Burnley | A | 1–2 | Hodge | 15,000 |
| 15 November 1919 | Burnley | H | 0–1 | | 25,000 |
| 22 November 1919 | Oldham Athletic | A | 3–0 | Hodges, Hopkin, Spence | 15,000 |
| 6 December 1919 | Aston Villa | A | 0–2 | | 40,000 |
| 13 December 1919 | Aston Villa | H | 1–2 | Hilditch | 30,000 |
| 20 December 1919 | Newcastle United | H | 2–1 | Hodges, Spence | 20,000 |
| 26 December 1919 | Liverpool | H | 0–0 | | 45,000 |
| 27 December 1919 | Newcastle United | A | 1–2 | Hilditch | 45,000 |
| 1 January 1920 | Liverpool | A | 0–0 | | 30,000 |
| 3 January 1920 | Chelsea | H | 0–2 | | 25,000 |
| 17 January 1920 | Chelsea | A | 0–1 | | 40,000 |
| 24 January 1920 | West Bromwich Albion | A | 1–2 | Woodcock | 20,000 |
| 7 February 1920 | Sunderland | A | 0–3 | | 25,000 |
| 11 February 1920 | Oldham Athletic | H | 1–1 | Bissett | 15,000 |
| 14 February 1920 | Sunderland | H | 2–0 | Harris, Hodges | 35,000 |
| 21 February 1920 | Arsenal | A | 3–0 | Spence (2), Hopkin | 25,000 |
| 25 February 1920 | West Bromwich Albion | H | 1–2 | Spence | 20,000 |
| 28 February 1920 | Arsenal | H | 0–1 | | 20,000 |
| 6 March 1920 | Everton | H | 1–0 | Bissett | 35,000 |
| 13 March 1920 | Everton | A | 0–0 | | 30,000 |
| 20 March 1920 | Bradford City | H | 0–0 | | 25,000 |
| 27 March 1920 | Bradford City | A | 1–2 | Bissett | 18,000 |
| 2 April 1920 | Bradford Park Avenue | H | 0–1 | | 30,000 |
| 3 April 1920 | Bolton Wanderers | H | 1–1 | Toms | 39,000 |
| 6 April 1920 | Bradford Park Avenue | A | 4–1 | Bissett, Grimwood, Toms, Woodcock | 14,000 |
| 10 April 1920 | Bolton Wanderers | A | 5–3 | Bissett (2), Meredith, Toms, Woodcock | 25,000 |
| 17 April 1920 | Blackburn Rovers | H | 1–1 | Hopkin | 40,000 |
| 24 April 1920 | Blackburn Rovers | A | 0–5 | | 30,000 |
| 26 April 1920 | Notts County | H | 0–0 | | 30,000 |
| 1 May 1920 | Notts County | A | 2–0 | Meredith, Spence | 20,000 |

| Pos | Team | Pld | W | D | L | GF | GA | GAv | Pts |
|---|---|---|---|---|---|---|---|---|---|
| 10 | Arsenal | 42 | 15 | 12 | 15 | 56 | 58 | 0.966 | 42 |
| 11 | Bradford (Park Avenue) | 42 | 15 | 12 | 15 | 60 | 63 | 0.952 | 42 |
| 12 | Manchester United | 42 | 13 | 14 | 15 | 54 | 50 | 1.080 | 40 |
| 13 | Middlesbrough | 42 | 15 | 10 | 17 | 61 | 65 | 0.938 | 40 |
| 14 | Sheffield United | 42 | 16 | 8 | 18 | 59 | 69 | 0.855 | 40 |

Source: World Football
Rules for classification: 1) Points; 2) Goal average; 3) Goals scored

== FA Cup ==
| Date | Round | Opponents | H / A | Result F–A | Scorers | Attendance |
|---|---|---|---|---|---|---|
| 10 January 1920 | First Round | Port Vale | A | 1–0 | Toms | 14,549 |
| 31 January 1920 | Second Round | Aston Villa | H | 1–2 | Woodcock | 48,600 |
