= Oscar Linkson =

English footballer (1888–1916)

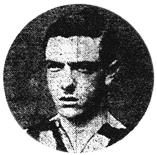

Personal information
- Full name: Oscar Horace Stanley Linkson
- Date of birth: 16 March 1888
- Place of birth: New Barnet, Hertfordshire, England
- Date of death: 8 August 1916 (aged 28) (missing in action)
- Place of death: Guillemont, France
- Height: 5 ft 9 1/2 in (1.77 m)
- Position: Full-back

Senior career*
Years	Team	Apps	(Gls)
- Barnet & Alston
1908–1913	Manchester United	55	(0)
1913–1914	Shelbourne		
1915–1916	→ Queens Park Rangers (guest)	17	
- * Club domestic league appearances and goals

Oscar Horace Stanley Linkson (16 March 1888 – 8 August 1916) was an English footballer who played as a full-back. He played for Manchester United for five years from 1908 to 1913, when he moved to Ireland to play for Shelbourne, where he spent a year before the outbreak of the First World War. During the war, he made guest appearances for Queens Park Rangers; however, in August 1916, he went missing during the Battle of the Somme and he was presumed dead.

== Football career ==
Linkson started his career with Barnet & Alston. By 1908, he was playing for an amateur team, Pirates FC. While on a continental tour, he was spotted by scouts from Manchester United, who were also touring in the same area, and he signed for the club in July 1908. He made his first-team debut on 24 October 1908 in a home match against Nottingham Forest, and went on to make a total of 10 appearances that season. He missed the entire 1909–10 season, but returned in 1910–11 to make seven appearances as United went on to win the First Division title. He became a regular in the team for the 1911–12 season, playing in 21 league matches and four in the FA Cup, taking over from Dick Holden and Tony Donnelly. He started the 1912–13 season as the club's first-choice right-back, but lost that position to Jimmy Hodge after Christmas 1912, making just three more appearances before the end of the season.

In August 1913, he transferred to Shelbourne in Dublin.

== Army career and disappearance ==
At the outbreak of the First World War, he returned to England, where he enrolled with the 1st Football Battalion of the Middlesex Regiment, who were formed under the Pals battalion scheme and made up entirely of sportsmen; he fought alongside other footballers, such as Walter Tull, Evelyn Lintott and Vivian Woodward.

On 8 August 1916, Private Linkson went missing in the battle to seize Guillemont Station during the Somme Offensive. His body was never recovered and he was recorded as missing presumed dead.

== Career statistics ==
Appearances and goals by club, season and competition
Club	Season	League			FA Cup		Total	
Club	Season	Division	Apps	Goals	Apps	Goals	Apps	Goals
Manchester United	1908–09	First Division	10	0	0	0	10	0
Manchester United	1909–10	First Division	0	0	0	0	0	0
Manchester United	1910–11	First Division	7	0	0	0	7	0
Manchester United	1911–12	First Division	21	0	4	0	25	0
Manchester United	1912–13	First Division	17	0	0	0	17	0
Manchester United	Total		55	0	4	0	59	0

== Honours ==
Shelbourne

- Leinster Senior Cup: 1913
- Gold Cup: 1914

== See also ==
- List of people who disappeared

== Books ==
- Dykes, Garth (1994). The United Alphabet: A Complete Who's Who of Manchester United F.C. Leicester: ACL & Polar Publishing. ISBN 0-9514862-6-8.
- Fitzpatrick, Seán (2009). Shelbourne Cult Heroes. Colour Books. ISBN 978-1-905483-67-9.
