= 1917–18 Manchester United F.C. season =

English football club season

Manchester United
1917–18 season
- Chairman: John Henry Davies
- Manager: Jack Robson
- Principal Tournament: 8th
- Subsidiary Tournament Group B: 2nd
| Home colours | Away colours |

The 1917–18 season was Manchester United's third season in the non-competitive War League.

With the ongoing First World War, once again Manchester United played non-competitive war league football. In the principal tournament they contested the Lancashire Section, in a 30-game season. In the subsidiary tournament they contested Group B of the Lancashire Section, in a group of four teams. However, none of these were considered to be competitive football, and thus their records are not recognised by the Football League.

On 9 October 1917 while Fighting in France during the First World War, former United player Arthur Beadsworth was killed while serving as a Sergeant in the Seventh Battalion of the Royal Leicestershire Regiment of the British Army.

== Lancashire Section Principal Tournament ==
| Date | Opponents | H / A | Result F–A | Scorers | Attendance |
|---|---|---|---|---|---|
| 1 September 1917 | Blackburn Rovers | A | 5–0 | Anderson (3), Meehan, Woodcock | |
| 8 September 1917 | Blackburn Rovers | H | 6–1 | Anderson (4), Woodcock (2) | |
| 15 September 1917 | Rochdale | A | 0–3 | | |
| 22 September 1917 | Rochdale | H | 1–1 | Woodcock | |
| 29 September 1917 | Manchester City | A | 1–3 | Anderson | |
| 6 October 1917 | Manchester City | H | 1–1 | Woodcock | |
| 13 October 1917 | Everton | A | 0–3 | | |
| 20 October 1917 | Everton | H | 0–0 | | |
| 27 October 1917 | Port Vale | H | 3–3 | Anderson, Connor, Ellis | |
| 3 November 1917 | Port Vale | A | 2–2 | Anderson, Ellis | |
| 10 November 1917 | Bolton Wanderers | A | 1–3 | Ellis | |
| 17 November 1917 | Bolton Wanderers | H | 2–4 | Anderson, Ellis | |
| 24 November 1917 | Preston North End | A | 2–1 | Anderson (2) | |
| 1 December 1917 | Preston North End | H | 0–0 | | |
| 8 December 1917 | Blackpool | H | 1–0 | Ellis | |
| 15 December 1917 | Blackpool | A | 3–2 | Woodcock (2), Meehan | |
| 22 December 1917 | Burnley | A | 5–0 | Anderson (3), Connor, Meehan | |
| 29 December 1917 | Burnley | H | 1–0 | Connor | |
| 5 January 1918 | Southport Central | A | 0–3 | | |
| 12 January 1918 | Southport Central | H | 0–0 | | |
| 19 January 1918 | Liverpool | A | 1–5 | Woodcock | |
| 26 January 1918 | Liverpool | H | 0–2 | | |
| 2 February 1918 | Stoke | H | 1–5 | Woodcock | |
| 9 February 1918 | Stoke | A | 2–1 | Ellis, Woodcock | |
| 16 February 1918 | Bury | A | 0–0 | | |
| 23 February 1918 | Bury | H | 2–1 | Massey, Woodcock | |
| 2 March 1918 | Oldham Athletic | A | 2–1 | Ellis, Woodcock | |
| 9 March 1918 | Oldham Athletic | H | 0–2 | | |
| 16 March 1918 | Stockport County | A | 2–0 | Buckley (2) | |
| 23 March 1918 | Stockport County | A | 1–2 | Buckley | |

| Pos | Team | Pld | W | D | L | GF | GA | GAv | Pts |
|---|---|---|---|---|---|---|---|---|---|
| 7 | Burnley | 30 | 13 | 4 | 13 | 68 | 70 | 0.971 | 30 |
| 8 | Manchester United | 30 | 11 | 8 | 11 | 45 | 49 | 0.918 | 30 |
| 9 | Rochdale | 30 | 11 | 6 | 13 | 50 | 59 | 0.847 | 28 |

== Lancashire Section Subsidiary Tournament Group B ==
| Date | Opponents | H / A | Result F–A | Scorers | Attendance |
|---|---|---|---|---|---|
| 29 March 1918 | Manchester City | A | 0–3 | | |
| 30 March 1918 | Stoke | H | 2–1 | Stafford, Woodcock | |
| 1 April 1918 | Manchester City | H | 2–0 | Buckley, Woodcock | |
| 6 April 1918 | Stoke | A | 0–0 | | |
| 13 April 1918 | Port Vale | H | 2–0 | Bourne (2) | |
| 20 April 1918 | Port Vale | A | 0–2 | | |

| Pos | Team | Pld | W | D | L | GF | GA | GAv | Pts |
|---|---|---|---|---|---|---|---|---|---|
| 1 | Manchester City | 6 | 4 | 1 | 1 | 11 | 4 | 2.750 | 9 |
| 2 | Manchester United | 6 | 3 | 1 | 2 | 6 | 7 | 0.857 | 7 |
| 3 | Stoke | 6 | 2 | 2 | 2 | 10 | 5 | 2.000 | 6 |
| 4 | Port Vale | 6 | 1 | 0 | 5 | 4 | 15 | 0.267 | 2 |
