= 1915–16 Manchester United F.C. season =

English football club season

Manchester United
1915–16 season
- Chairman: John Henry Davies
- Manager: Jack Robson
- Principal Tournament: 11th
- Subsidiary Tournament Southern Division: 6th
Home colours	Away colours

The 1915–16 season would have been Manchester United's 24th season in the Football League and ninth in the First Division.

With the start of the First World War, all Football League football was cancelled. In its place were formed War Leagues, based on geographical lines rather than based on previous league placement. Manchester United contested the Lancashire Section in the Principal Tournament, and the Southern Division of the Lancashire Section in the Subsidiary Tournament. However, none of these were considered to be competitive football, and thus their records are not recognised by the Football League.

== Lancashire Section Principal Tournament ==
Date	Opponents	H / A	Result F–A	Scorers	Attendance
4 September 1915	Oldham Athletic	A	2–3	Halligan, Wilson	
11 September 1915	Everton	H	2–4	Wilson (2)	
18 September 1915	Bolton Wanderers	A	5–3	West (2), Woodcock (2), A. Davies	
25 September 1915	Manchester City	H	1–1	Halligan	
2 October 1915	Stoke	A	0–0		
9 October 1915	Burnley	H	3–7	D. Davies, Wilson, Woodcock	
16 October 1915	Preston North End	A	0–0		
23 October 1915	Stockport County	H	3–0	Halligan, Hughes, Woodcock	
30 October 1915	Liverpool	A	2–0	West, Wilson	
6 November 1915	Bury	H	1–1	Woodcock	
13 November 1915	Rochdale	H	2–0	A. Davies, Gipps	
20 November 1915	Blackpool	A	1–5	Woodcock	
27 November 1915	Southport Central	H	0–0		
4 December 1915	Oldham Athletic	H	2–0	Anderson, Halligan	
11 December 1915	Everton	A	0–2		
18 December 1915	Bolton Wanderers	H	1–0	Bracegirdle	
25 December 1915	Manchester City	A	1–2	Halligan	
1 January 1916	Stoke	H	1–2	Woodcock	
8 January 1916	Burnley	A	4–7	Travis (4)	
15 January 1916	Preston North End	H	4–0	Woodcock (2), Hughes, Halligan	
22 January 1916	Stockport County	A	1–3	Woodcock	
29 January 1916	Liverpool	H	1–1	Cookson	
5 February 1916	Bury	A	1–2	Travis	
12 February 1916	Rochdale	A	2–2	Halligan, Woodcock	
19 February 1916	Blackpool	H	1–1	Woodcock	
26 February 1916	Southport Central	A	0–5		

Pos	Team	Pld	W	D	L	GF	GA	GAv	Pts
10	Bury	26	10	3	13	46	52	0.885	23
11	Manchester United	26	7	8	11	41	51	0.804	22
12	Bolton Wanderers	26	9	3	14	48	65	0.738	21

== Lancashire Section Subsidiary Tournament Southern Division ==
Date	Opponents	H / A	Result F–A	Scorers	Attendance
4 March 1916	Everton	H	0–2		
11 March 1916	Oldham Athletic	A	0–1		
18 March 1916	Liverpool	H	0–0		
25 March 1916	Manchester City	H	0–2		
1 April 1916	Stockport County	A	3–5	Campey (2), Winterburn	
8 April 1916	Everton	A	1–3	Forster	
15 April 1916	Oldham Athletic	H	3–0	Crossley, Halligan, Knowles	
21 April 1916	Stockport County	H	3–2	Crossley, Halligan, Woodcock	
22 April 1916	Liverpool	A	1–7	Woodcock	
29 April 1916	Manchester City	A	1–2	Crossley	

Pos	Team	Pld	W	D	L	GF	GA	GAv	Pts
4	Oldham Athletic	10	4	2	4	17	21	0.810	10
5	Stockport County	10	4	1	5	19	18	1.056	9
6	Manchester United	10	2	1	7	12	24	0.500	5
