= Jimmy Hodge =

Scottish footballer

James Hodge
Personal information
- Full name: James Hodge
- Date of birth: 5 July 1891
- Place of birth: Stenhousemuir, Scotland
- Date of death: 2 September 1970 (aged 79)
- Place of death: Manchester, England
- Height: 5 ft 8 in (1.73 m)
- Positions: Full back; centre half

Senior career*
Years	Team	Apps	(Gls)
1909–1910	Stenhousemuir		
1910–1919	Manchester United	79	(2)
1919–1922	Millwall Athletic	17	(1)
1922–1923	Norwich City	51	(1)
1923–1924	Southend United	18	(0)
1924–1925	Buxton		
- Buxton Medical Institution
Total		165+	(4+)
- * Club domestic league appearances and goals

James Hodge (5 July 1891 – 2 September 1970) was a Scottish professional footballer who played in the Football League for Manchester United, Millwall, Norwich City and Southend United as a full back or centre half.

== Personal life ==
Hodge's younger brother John and a brother-in-law also became a footballers. He served as a gunner in India and Mesopotamia with the Royal Garrison Artillery during the First World War.

== Career statistics ==
Appearances and goals by club, season and competition
Club	Season	League			National Cup		Total	
Club	Season	Division	Apps	Goals	Apps	Goals	Apps	Goals
Manchester United	1910–11	First Division	2	0	0	0	2	0
Manchester United	1911–12	First Division	10	0	0	0	10	0
Manchester United	1912–13	First Division	19	0	5	0	24	0
Manchester United	1913–14	First Division	28	0	1	0	29	0
Manchester United	1914–15	First Division	4	0	0	0	4	0
Manchester United	1919–20	First Division	16	2	0	0	16	2
Manchester United	Total		79	2	6	0	85	2
Millwall	1920–21	Third Division South	17	1	0	0	17	1
Norwich City	1921–22	Third Division South	15	0	0	0	15	0
Norwich City	1922–23	Third Division South	36	1	4	1	30	2
Norwich City	Total		51	1	4	1	55	2
Southend United	1923–24	Third Division South	18	0	3	0	21	0
Career total			165	4	13	1	178	5
