= Sam Blott =

English footballer

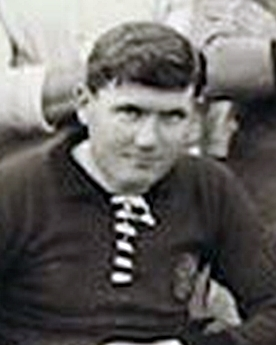
- Blott while with Plymouth Argyle in 1914.

Personal information
- Full name: Samuel Prince Blott
- Date of birth: 19 June 1886
- Place of birth: Holloway, England
- Date of death: 31 January 1969 (aged 82)
- Place of death: Southend-on-Sea, England
- Position: Forward

Senior career*
Years	Team	Apps	(Gls)
- Southend Athletic
1907–1908	Bradford Park Avenue	10	(3)
1908–1909	Southend United	40	(1)
1909–1913	Manchester United	19	(2)
1913–1920	Plymouth Argyle	66	(7)
1917	→ Brentford (guest)	1	(0)
1920–1922	Newport County	17	(1)
1922	Dartford		
- * Club domestic league appearances and goals

Samuel Prince Blott (19 June 1886 – 31 January 1969), sometimes known as Prince Blott, was an English professional footballer who played as a forward in the Football League for Manchester United and Newport County. He also played in the Southern League for Plymouth Argyle, Southend United and Bradford Park Avenue.

== Personal life ==
Blott served as a private in the Army Veterinary Corps during the First World War.

== Career statistics ==
Appearances and goals by club, season and competition
Club	Season	League			FA Cup		Total	
Club	Season	Division	Apps	Goals	Apps	Goals	Apps	Goals
Bradford Park Avenue	1907–08	Southern League First Division	10	3	0	0	10	3
Manchester United	1909–10	First Division	10	1	0	0	10	1
Manchester United	1910–11	First Division	1	0	0	0	1	0
Manchester United	1911–12	First Division	6	0	0	0	6	0
Manchester United	1912–13	First Division	2	1	0	0	2	1
Manchester United	Total		19	2	0	0	19	2
Plymouth Argyle	1913–14	Southern League First Division	30	3	2	0	32	3
Plymouth Argyle	1914–15	Southern League First Division	19	2	1	0	20	2
Plymouth Argyle	1919–20	Southern League First Division	14	2	0	0	14	2
Plymouth Argyle	Total		63	7	3	0	66	7
Career total			92	12	3	0	95	12
