= Arthur Hooper =

English footballer

Personal information
- Full name: Arthur Henry Hooper
- Date of birth: 5 December 1888
- Place of birth: Brierley Hill, England
- Date of death: 22 December 1963 (aged 75)
- Place of death: Kidderminster, England
- Position: Forward

Youth career
- Clay Cross Town

Senior career*
Years	Team	Apps	(Gls)
- Kidderminster Harriers
1909–1914	Manchester United	7	(1)
1914–1915	Crystal Palace	18	(2)
- * Club domestic league appearances and goals

Arthur Henry Hooper (5 December 1888 – 22 December 1963) was an English professional footballer who played as a forward in the Football League for Manchester United.

== Personal life ==
In December 1915, over a year after the outbreak of the First World War, Hooper enlisted in the British Army under the Derby Scheme. He was mobilised on 1 July 1916 and joined the Worcestershire Regiment. Prior to that point, he had worked in munitions. Hooper served as a corporal during the final 14 months of the First World War and saw action at the Polygon Wood, Broodseinde, Poelcappelle and on the Italian Front. He suffered a gunshot wound to the head on 30 July 1918 and after recovering, he was attached to the Labour Corps and made acting company sergeant major of the 517th Prisoner of War Company. Hooper returned to Britain and was transferred to the reserve list in September 1919.

== Career statistics ==
Appearances and goals by club, season and competition
Club	Season	League			FA Cup		Total	
Club	Season	Division	Apps	Goals	Apps	Goals	Apps	Goals
Manchester United	1909–10	First Division	2	1	0	0	2	1
Manchester United	1910–11	First Division	2	0	0	0	2	0
Manchester United	1913–14	First Division	3	0	0	0	3	0
Manchester United	Total		7	1	0	0	7	1
Crystal Palace	1914–15	Southern League First Division	18	2	0	0	18	2
Career total			25	3	0	0	25	3
