= 1909–10 Manchester United F.C. season =

English football club season

Manchester United
1909–10 season
- Chairman: John Henry Davies
- Manager: Ernest Mangnall
- Stadium: Bank Street Ground
- First Division: 5th
- FA Cup: First Round
- Top goalscorer: League: George Wall (14); All: George Wall (14)
- Highest home attendance: 50,000 vs Bristol City (25 March 1910)
- Lowest home attendance: 5,500 vs Everton (6 April 1910)
- Average home league attendance: 19,447
Home colours	Away colours	Third colours

The 1909–10 season was Manchester United's 18th consecutive season in the Football League and fourth in a row in the First Division.

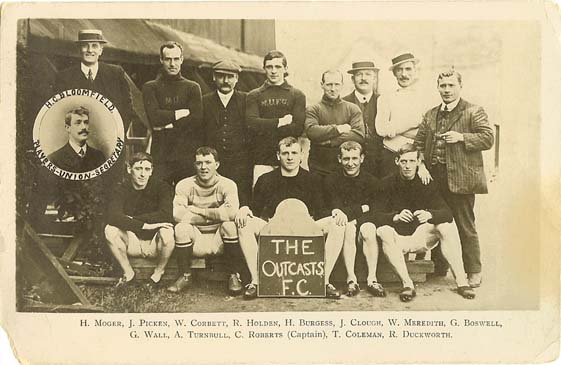
The "Outcasts F.C."

The club's participation in the Football League seemed uncertain at the start of the season, the Football Association withdrew its recognition of the Association of Football Players’ and Trainers’ Union when the union's intentions were made clear to the FA. Footballers throughout the country relinquished their membership of the AFPTU but the Manchester United team stood up to the FA and refused to give up membership. The club's players, who were dubbed by the press as the "Outcasts FC", continued to strike against the FA until their demands were met, but the FA responded by banning those affiliated with the AFPTU. A compromise was reached between the two parties and the suspension was lifted in time for the first game of the season.

In February 1910, the club moved from their old ground at Bank Street to a new home at Old Trafford. The first game played at the new stadium was a First Division fixture against Liverpool on 19 February 1910; the visitors won the match 4–3.

== First Division ==
Date	Opponents	H / A	Result F–A	Scorers	Attendance
1 September 1909	Bradford City	H	1–0	Wall	12,000
4 September 1909	Bury	H	2–0	J. Turnbull (2)	12,000
6 September 1909	Notts County	H	2–1	J. Turnbull, Wall	6,000
11 September 1909	Tottenham Hotspur	A	2–2	J. Turnbull, Wall	40,000
18 September 1909	Preston North End	H	1–1	Roberts	13,000
25 September 1909	Notts County	A	2–3	S. Turnbull (2)	11,000
2 October 1909	Newcastle United	H	1–1	Wall	30,000
9 October 1909	Liverpool	A	2–3	S. Turnbull (2)	40,000
16 October 1909	Aston Villa	H	2–0	Halse, S. Turnbull	20,000
23 October 1909	Sheffield United	A	1–0	S. Turnbull	30,000
30 October 1909	Arsenal	H	1–0	Wall	20,000
6 November 1909	Bolton Wanderers	A	3–2	Homer (2), Halse	20,000
13 November 1909	Chelsea	H	2–0	S. Turnbull, Wall	10,000
20 November 1909	Blackburn Rovers	A	2–3	Homer (2)	40,000
27 November 1909	Nottingham Forest	H	2–6	Halse, Wall	12,000
4 December 1909	Sunderland	A	0–3		12,000
18 December 1909	Middlesbrough	A	2–1	Homer, S. Turnbull	10,000
25 December 1909	Sheffield Wednesday	H	0–3		25,000
27 December 1909	Sheffield Wednesday	A	1–4	Wall	37,000
1 January 1910	Bradford City	A	2–0	S. Turnbull, Wall	25,000
8 January 1910	Bury	A	1–1	Homer	10,000
22 January 1910	Tottenham Hotspur	H	5–0	Roberts (2), Connor, Hooper, Meredith	7,000
5 February 1910	Preston North End	A	0–1		4,000
12 February 1910	Newcastle United	A	4–3	S. Turnbull (2), Blott, Roberts	20,000
19 February 1910	Liverpool	H	3–4	Homer, S. Turnbull, Wall	45,000
26 February 1910	Aston Villa	A	1–7	Meredith	20,000
5 March 1910	Sheffield United	H	1–0	Picken	40,000
12 March 1910	Arsenal	A	0–0		4,000
19 March 1910	Bolton Wanderers	H	5–0	Halse, Meredith, Picken, J. Turnbull, Wall	20,000
25 March 1910	Bristol City	H	2–1	Picken, J. Turnbull	50,000
26 March 1910	Chelsea	A	1–1	J. Turnbull	25,000
28 March 1910	Bristol City	A	1–2	Meredith	18,000
2 April 1910	Blackburn Rovers	H	2–0	Halse (2)	20,000
6 April 1910	Everton	H	3–2	J. Turnbull (2), Meredith	5,500
9 April 1910	Nottingham Forest	A	0–2		7,000
16 April 1910	Sunderland	H	2–0	S. Turnbull, Wall	12,000
23 April 1910	Everton	A	3–3	Homer, S. Turnbull, Wall	10,000
30 April 1910	Middlesbrough	H	4–1	Picken (4)	10,000

Pos	Team	Pld	W	D	L	GF	GA	GAv	Pts
3	Blackburn Rovers	38	18	9	11	73	55	1.327	45
4	Newcastle United	38	19	7	12	70	56	1.250	45
5	Manchester United	38	19	7	12	69	61	1.131	45
6	Sheffield United	38	16	10	12	62	41	1.512	42
7	Bradford City	38	17	8	13	64	47	1.362	42

Source: World Football
Rules for classification: 1) Points; 2) Goal average; 3) Goals scored

== FA Cup ==
Date	Round	Opponents	H / A	Result F–A	Scorers	Attendance
15 January 1910	First Round	Burnley	A	0–2		16,628
