= 1912–13 Manchester United F.C. season =

English football club season

Manchester United
1912–13 season
- Chairman: John Henry Davies
- Manager: John Bentley
- First Division: 4th
- FA Cup: Third Round
- Top goalscorer: League: Enoch West (21); All: Enoch West (22)
- Highest home attendance: 45,000 vs Blackburn Rovers (5 October 1912); 45,000 vs The Wednesday (25 January 1913)
- Lowest home attendance: 8,000 vs Liverpool (23 November 1912)
- Average home league attendance: 22,311
Home colours	Away colours

The 1912–13 season was Manchester United's 21st season in the Football League and sixth in the First Division.

== First Division ==
Date	Opponents	H / A	Result F–A	Scorers	Attendance
2 September 1912	Woolwich Arsenal	A	0–0		11,000
7 September 1912	Manchester City	H	0–1		40,000
14 September 1912	West Bromwich Albion	A	2–1	Livingstone, Turnbull	25,000
21 September 1912	Everton	H	2–0	West (2)	40,000
28 September 1912	The Wednesday	A	3–3	West (2), Turnbull	30,000
5 October 1912	Blackburn Rovers	H	1–1	Wall	45,000
12 October 1912	Derby County	A	1–2	Turnbull	15,000
19 October 1912	Tottenham Hotspur	H	2–0	Turnbull, West	12,000
26 October 1912	Middlesbrough	A	2–3	Nuttall (2)	10,000
2 November 1912	Notts County	H	2–1	Anderson, Meredith	12,000
9 November 1912	Sunderland	A	1–3	West	20,000
16 November 1912	Aston Villa	A	2–4	Wall, West	20,000
23 November 1912	Liverpool	H	3–1	Anderson (2), Wall	8,000
30 November 1912	Bolton Wanderers	A	1–2	Wall	25,000
7 December 1912	Sheffield United	H	4–0	Anderson, Turnbull, Wall, West	12,000
14 December 1912	Newcastle United	A	3–1	West (3)	20,000
21 December 1912	Oldham Athletic	H	0–0		30,000
25 December 1912	Chelsea	A	4–1	West (2), Anderson, Whalley	33,000
26 December 1912	Chelsea	H	4–2	Turnbull (2), Anderson, Wall	20,000
28 December 1912	Manchester City	A	2–0	West (2)	38,000
1 January 1913	Bradford City	H	2–0	Anderson (2)	30,000
4 January 1913	West Bromwich Albion	H	1–1	Roberts	25,000
18 January 1913	Everton	A	1–4	Hamill	20,000
25 January 1913	The Wednesday	H	2–0	West, Whalley	45,000
8 February 1913	Blackburn Rovers	A	0–0		38,000
15 February 1913	Derby County	H	4–0	West (2), Anderson, Turnbull	30,000
1 March 1913	Middlesbrough	H	2–3	Meredith, Whalley	15,000
8 March 1913	Notts County	A	2–1	Anderson, Turnbull	10,000
15 March 1913	Sunderland	H	1–3	Sheldon	15,000
21 March 1913	Woolwich Arsenal	H	2–0	Anderson, Whalley	20,000
22 March 1913	Aston Villa	H	4–0	Stacey, Turnbull, Wall, West	30,000
25 March 1913	Bradford City	A	0–1		25,000
29 March 1913	Liverpool	A	2–0	Wall, West	12,000
31 March 1913	Tottenham Hotspur	A	1–1	Blott	12,000
5 April 1913	Bolton Wanderers	H	2–1	Anderson, Wall	30,000
12 April 1913	Sheffield United	A	1–2	Wall	12,000
19 April 1913	Newcastle United	H	3–0	Hunter (2), West	10,000
26 April 1913	Oldham Athletic	A	0–0		3,000

Pos	Team	Pld	W	D	L	GF	GA	GAv	Pts
2	Aston Villa	38	19	12	7	86	52	1.654	50
3	The Wednesday	38	21	7	10	75	55	1.364	49
4	Manchester United	38	19	8	11	69	43	1.605	46
5	Blackburn Rovers	38	16	13	9	79	43	1.837	45
6	Manchester City	38	18	8	12	53	37	1.432	44

Source: World Football
Rules for classification: 1) Points; 2) Goal average; 3) Goals scored

== FA Cup ==
Date	Round	Opponents	H / A	Result F–A	Scorers	Attendance
11 January 1913	First Round	Coventry City	H	1–1	Wall	11,500
16 January 1913	First Round; Replay	Coventry City	A	2–1	Anderson, Roberts	20,042
1 February 1913	Second Round	Plymouth Argyle	A	2–0	Anderson, Wall	21,700
22 February 1913	Third Round	Oldham Athletic	A	0–0		26,932
26 February 1913	Third Round; Replay	Oldham Athletic	H	1–2	West	31,180
