= Jocelyn Rowe =

English footballer

Personal information
- Full name: Jocelyn Alexander Rowe
- Date of birth: 4 January 1886
- Place of birth: Allahabad, British India
- Date of death: 28 May 1956 (aged 70)
- Place of death: Kingston upon Thames, England
- Position: Right-back

Senior career*
Years	Team	Apps	(Gls)
1912–1917	Bohemians	17	(1)
1914	Manchester United	1	(0)
1919	Bohemians		
1919-1923	Kingstonian		

International career
1913	Irish League XI	1	(0)
- * Club domestic league appearances and goals

Jocelyn Alexander Rowe (4 January 1886 – 28 May 1956) was an English footballer who played made one appearance as a right-back in the Football League for Manchester United. He represented the Irish League XI.

== Personal life ==
Rowe enlisted in the British Army in January 1900, two days after he turned 14. He served as a colour sergeant in the East Surrey Regiment during the First World War.

== Career statistics ==
Appearances and goals by club, season and competition
Club	Season	League			National Cup		Total	
Club	Season	Division	Apps	Goals	Apps	Goals	Apps	Goals
Manchester United	1913–14	First Division	1	0	—		1	0
Career total			1	0	0	0	1	0
