= Ted Connor =

English footballer (1884–1955)

Personal information
- Full name: J. Edward Connor
- Date of birth: 19 April 1884
- Place of birth: Weaste, England
- Date of death: 19 January 1955 (aged 70)
- Place of death: Stretford, England
- Height: 5 ft 7 in (1.70 m)
- Positions: Outside forward; inside left

Senior career*
Years	Team	Apps	(Gls)
- Eccles Borough
1907–1908	Lincoln City	4	(0)
- Eccles Borough
–1909	Walkden Central		
1909–1910	Manchester United	15	(2)
1911–1912	Sheffield United	14	(0)
1912–1919	Bury	89	(4)
- Fulham
1919–1920	Exeter City		
1920–1921	Rochdale	28	(1)
1921	Nelson		
1921–1922	Chesterfield	9	(2)
- Saltney Athletic
- * Club domestic league appearances and goals

J. Edward Connor (19 April 1884 – 19 January 1955) was an English professional footballer who played as an outside forward in the Football League for Lincoln City, Manchester United, Sheffield United, Bury and Chesterfield. After his retirement from football, Connor returned to Manchester United as a scout and office worker.

== Personal life ==
Connor worked as a warehouseman. He served in the Royal Naval Air Service, the Royal Navy and the Royal Air Force during the First World War.

== Career statistics ==
Appearances and goals by club, season and competition
Club	Season	League			National cup (Note: Includes FA Cup)		Other		Total	
Club	Season	Division	Apps	Goals	Apps	Goals	Apps	Goals	Apps	Goals
Lincoln City	1907–08	Second Division	4	0	0	0	—		4	0
Manchester United	1909–10	First Division	8	1	0	0	—		8	1
Manchester United	1910–11	First Division	7	1	0	0	—		7	1
Manchester United	Total		15	2	0	0	—		15	2
Sheffield United	1911–12	First Division	14	0	0	0	—		14	0
Bury	1912–13	Second Division	36	2	3	0	—		39	2
Bury	1913–14	Second Division	38	0	3	0	—		41	0
Bury	1914–15	Second Division	15	2	3	1	—		18	3
Bury	Total		89	4	9	1	—		98	5
Rochdale	1920–21	Central League	28	1	4	1	3 (Note: Appearances in Manchester Senior Cup)	0	35	2
Chesterfield	1921–22	Third Division North	9	2	2	0	—		11	2
Career total			159	9	15	2	3	0	177	11
