= George Bisset =

George Bisset or Bissett may refer to:

- George Bisset (footballer) (born 1943), Australian rules footballer
- George Bissett (footballer) (1896–1946), Scottish footballer
- George Bissett (cricketer) (1905–1965), South African sportsman
- Maurice George Bisset (1757–1821), involved in the criminal conversation trial of Sir Richard Worsley, 7th Baronet and his wife
