= 1913–14 Manchester United F.C. season =

English football club season

Manchester United
1913–14 season
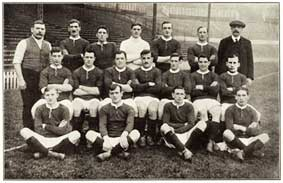
- The United team at the start of the 1913–14 season; Billy Meredith is second from the left in the back row.
- Chairman: John Henry Davies
- Manager: John Bentley
- First Division: 14th
- FA Cup: First Round
- Top goalscorer: League: George Anderson (15); All: George Anderson (15)
- Highest home attendance: 55,000 vs Oldham Athletic (27 September 1913)
- Lowest home attendance: 4,500 vs Sheffield United (22 April 1914)
- Average home league attendance: 26,763
Home colours	Away colours

The 1913–14 season was Manchester United's 22nd season in the Football League and seventh in the First Division.

== First Division ==
Date	Opponents	H / A	Result F–A	Scorers	Attendance
6 September 1913	The Wednesday	A	3–1	Turnbull, West, own goal	32,000
8 September 1913	Sunderland	H	3–1	Anderson, Turnbull, Whalley	25,000
13 September 1913	Bolton Wanderers	H	0–1		45,000
20 September 1913	Chelsea	A	2–0	Anderson, Wall	40,000
27 September 1913	Oldham Athletic	H	4–1	West (2), Anderson, Wall	55,000
4 October 1913	Tottenham Hotspur	H	3–1	Stacey, Wall, Whalley	25,000
11 October 1913	Burnley	A	2–1	Anderson (2)	30,000
18 October 1913	Preston North End	H	3–0	Anderson (3)	30,000
25 October 1913	Newcastle United	A	1–0	West	35,000
1 November 1913	Liverpool	H	3–0	Wall (2), West	30,000
8 November 1913	Aston Villa	A	1–3	Woodcock	20,000
15 November 1913	Middlesbrough	H	0–1		15,000
22 November 1913	Sheffield United	A	0–2		30,000
29 November 1913	Derby County	H	3–3	Turnbull (2), Meredith	20,000
6 December 1913	Manchester City	A	2–0	Anderson (2)	40,000
13 December 1913	Bradford City	H	1–1	Knowles	18,000
20 December 1913	Blackburn Rovers	A	1–0	own goal	35,000
25 December 1913	Everton	H	0–1		25,000
26 December 1913	Everton	A	0–5		40,000
27 December 1913	The Wednesday	H	2–1	Meredith, Wall	10,000
1 January 1914	West Bromwich Albion	H	1–0	Wall	35,000
3 January 1914	Bolton Wanderers	A	1–6	West	35,000
17 January 1914	Chelsea	H	0–1		20,000
24 January 1914	Oldham Athletic	A	2–2	Wall, Woodcock	10,000
7 February 1914	Tottenham Hotspur	A	1–2	Wall	22,000
14 February 1914	Burnley	H	0–1		35,000
21 February 1914	Middlesbrough	A	1–3	Anderson	12,000
28 February 1914	Newcastle United	H	2–2	Anderson, Potts	30,000
5 March 1914	Preston North End	A	2–4	Travers, Wall	12,000
14 March 1914	Aston Villa	H	0–6		30,000
4 April 1914	Derby County	A	2–4	Anderson, Travers	7,000
10 April 1914	Sunderland	A	0–2		20,000
11 April 1914	Manchester City	H	0–1		36,000
13 April 1914	West Bromwich Albion	A	1–2	Travers	20,000
15 April 1914	Liverpool	A	2–1	Travers, Wall	28,000
18 April 1914	Bradford City	A	1–1	Thomson	10,000
22 April 1914	Sheffield United	H	2–1	Anderson (2)	4,500
25 April 1914	Blackburn Rovers	H	0–0		20,000

Pos	Team	Pld	W	D	L	GF	GA	GAv	Pts
12	Burnley	38	12	12	14	61	53	1.151	36
13	Manchester City	38	14	8	16	51	53	0.962	36
14	Manchester United	38	15	6	17	52	62	0.839	36
15	Everton	38	12	11	15	46	55	0.836	35
16	Liverpool	38	14	7	17	46	62	0.742	35

Source: World Football
Rules for classification: 1) Points; 2) Goal average; 3) Goals scored

== FA Cup ==
Date	Round	Opponents	H / A	Result F–A	Scorers	Attendance
10 January 1914	First Round	Swindon Town	A	0–1		18,187
