= Billy Toms =

Irish footballer

William Toms MC (born 19 May 1895, date of death unknown) was an Irish footballer. His regular position was as a forward. He was born in Curragh.

Toms became a professional after the First World War, in which he was awarded the Military Cross, when he broke into Manchester United's first team playing 14 games for them in his first season, but was allowed to leave and joined Plymouth Argyle for £500 in September 1920.

He went on to play for Oldham Athletic, Coventry City, Stockport County, Wrexham and Crewe Alexandra in the Football League.

Coventry were the only club where he was successful, which was surprising considering the shambolic state of the club at the time. Toms holds the distinction of scoring Coventry's first hat-trick in the Football League, in the 7–1 victory over Wolves on Christmas Day 1922. He left Coventry having been suspended by the club for an undisclosed act of "misconduct" along with Arthur Ormston.

He went on to play non-league football with Great Harwood, Winsford United and CWS Margarine Works.
