= Joe Wilson (footballer, born 1883) =

English footballer (1883–1945)

Personal information
- Full name: Joseph Wilson
- Date of birth: 10 April 1883
- Place of birth: Westhoughton, England
- Date of death: 6 June 1945 (aged 62)
- Place of death: Westhoughton, England
- Height: 5 ft 10 3/4 in (1.80 m)
- Position: Centre half

Senior career*
Years	Team	Apps	(Gls)
1902–1903	Wigan United		
1903–1905	Darwen		
1905–1908	Blackburn Rovers	42	(4)
1908–1909	Brighton & Hove Albion	25	(0)
1909–1920	Millwall	238	(30)
1920–1921	Rochdale	19	(1)
1921–192?	Fleetwood		
- * Club domestic league appearances and goals

Joseph Wilson (10 April 1883 – 6 June 1945) was an English professional footballer who played as a centre half in the Football League for Blackburn Rovers. He also played for Brighton & Hove Albion and Millwall of the Southern League, and played for that league's representative team.

== Personal life ==
Wilson was born in 1883 in Westhoughton, near Bolton in Lancashire. Before becoming a professional footballer, he worked as a collier. Wilson married Ann Ellen Settle in 1908. The 1911 Census records the couple living in East Ferry Road, Millwall, with their baby son, also named Joseph. The 1939 Register finds Wilson employed as a railway wagon builder and living in Central Drive, Westhoughton, with his wife and three children of working age. He was still resident at that address when he died, in June 1945 at the age of 62.

== Football career ==
Wilson played football for Wigan United of the Lancashire League before moving on to Darwen in 1903. He helped the Lancashire Combination club reach the intermediate round of the 1903–04 FA Cup, in which they lost narrowly to Preston North End, who were on their way to becoming that season's Second Division champions.

He signed for Blackburn Rovers in April 1905 as cover at centre half, and made his debut in the First Division on 17 February 1906 away to Woolwich Arsenal, replacing Sammy McClure as one of several changes in an experimental line-up. Although Rovers lost 3–2, Wilson scored their first goal with a header from a corner and, according to the Athletic News' "Busy Bee", "was a trifle ungainly, but he promises to develop into a good player". He kept his place for the next two matches and then returned to the reserves. Early in the 1906–07 season, England international centre-half Kelly Houlker dislocated a kneecap, which gave Wilson a chance to establish himself in the team. By the end of November, the Athletic News had concluded that he was "fast developing into a really capable centre half-back": deceptively quick "by reason of his length of limb", a "splendid tackler", and particularly skilled at feeding the ball to his forwards. Wilson finished the season with 29 First Division appearances, but was not first choice for 1907–08, playing only 10 matches in the middle of the season.

Wilson spent the 1908–09 Southern League season with Brighton & Hove Albion. He missed two months with injury, but still played 35 matches in all competitions, and moved on to another Southern League club, Millwall. In his second season with the club, he was selected for the league's representative team to face the Scottish League XI for the first time in October 1910. He captained the Millwall team, and remained with them into the war years, until his wife's health meant they left London and returned to Lancashire, where he found work in the Bolton area and was able to play for Bolton Wanderers. He rejoined Millwall for the first post-war season, taking his totals to 30 goals from 238 Southern League matches, before returning north to spend the 1920–21 season with Rochdale, for whom he scored once in 19 appearances in the Central League. In 1921, he moved on to Fleetwood of the Lancashire Combination as player-coach.
