= Jack Quin =

Scottish footballer

Personal information
- Full name: John Joseph Quin
- Date of birth: 2 July 1890
- Place of birth: Barrhead, Renfrewshire, Scotland
- Date of death: 1953 (aged 62–63)
- Place of death: Ayr, Ayrshire, Scotland
- Height: 5 ft 10 in (1.78 m)
- Positions: Outside right; centre-forward

Youth career
- Xaverian College
- Higher Broughton
- Cheetham Hill

Senior career*
| Years | Team | Apps | (Gls) |
| 1907–1908 | Manchester City | 0 | (0) |
| 1908–1910 | Manchester United | 2 | (0) |
| 1910 | Nelson | | |
| 1910–1911 | Chorley | | |
| 1911–1912 | Eccles Borough | | |
| 1912–1919 | Grimsby Town | 61 | (5) |
| 1919–1921 | Clyde | | |
| 1921–1923 | Ayr United | | |
- * Club domestic league appearances and goals

John Joseph Quin (2 July 1890 – 1953) was a Scottish footballer who played as a forward. He played in the Football League for Manchester United and Grimsby Town, and also spent a season with Manchester City without making an appearance. After the First World War, he played in Scotland for Clyde and Ayr United.

== Career ==
Quin was born to Anna Maria (née Burns) and John Quin in Barrhead, Renfrewshire, but lived in Manchester from the age of 12. He played for Xaverian College, Higher Broughton and Cheetham Hill as a youth, before attracting the attention of Manchester City at the age of 17. He signed for the club in November 1907 after scoring against Liverpool in a trial match for the reserve team; however, he refused to sign a new contract at the end of the season and joined Manchester United.

He made his Football League debut at centre-forward, standing in for Jimmy Turnbull in a 2–0 away defeat to Sheffield Wednesday on 3 April 1909. His only other appearance for the club came on New Year's Day 1910, playing at outside right in a 2–0 win at Bradford City. During his time at Manchester United, Quin was also a teacher, which left little time for training. This resulted in him being let go by Manchester United, and he joined Nelson at the end of the 1909–10 season. His time there was short, and he moved to Chorley before the end of the year, followed by a move to Eccles Borough in October 1911.

In May 1912, however, he was signed by Grimsby Town, giving up his teaching job to go full-time as a footballer. In the two years before the outbreak of the First World War, Quin played 61 times for the Second Division side, but scored just five times, and at the end of the war, he moved to Scotland to play for Clyde. He spent two years there, followed by two years with Ayr United, during which time he scored a combined 36 goals in 52 appearances. After retiring from football, Quin became a linesman with the Scottish Football League.

Quin married Mary Caughey MacGavin in Milton in 1921. Quin's father, John Sr., was also a footballer who played as an amateur for Edinburgh Hibernian and had international trials for Scotland. Quin died in April in 1953 at the age of 62.
