= James Montgomery (footballer, born 1890) =

English footballer

Personal information
- Full name: James Montgomery
- Date of birth: 12 October 1890
- Place of birth: Craghead, England
- Date of death: 14 November 1960 (aged 70)
- Height: 5 ft 9 in (1.75 m)
- Position: Right half

Senior career*
Years	Team	Apps	(Gls)
- Bishop Auckland
- Craghead United
1912–1915	Glossop	67	(1)
1915–1921	Manchester United	27	(1)
1921	Crewe Alexandra	0	(0)
- * Club domestic league appearances and goals

James Montgomery MM (12 October 1890 – 14 November 1960) was an English professional footballer who played as a right half in the Football League for Glossop and Manchester United. He also served Manchester United as a youth coach.

== Personal life ==
Montgomery served as a lance corporal in the Royal Inniskilling Fusiliers during the First World War and was awarded the Military Medal.

== Career statistics ==
Appearances and goals by club, season and competition
Club	Season	League			FA Cup		Total	
Club	Season	Division	Apps	Goals	Apps	Goals	Apps	Goals
Glossop	1914–15	Second Division	28	0	1	0	29	0
Manchester United	1914–15	First Division	11	0	—		11	0
Manchester United	1919–20	First Division	14	1	0	0	14	1
Manchester United	1920–21	First Division	2	0	0	0	2	0
Manchester United	Total		27	1	0	0	27	1
Career total			55	1	1	0	56	1
