= George Wall =

English footballer

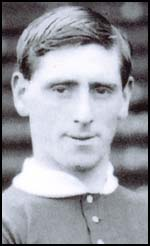

Personal information
- Full name: George Wall
- Date of birth: 20 February 1885
- Place of birth: Boldon Colliery, England
- Date of death: June 1962 (aged 77)
- Place of death: Manchester, England
- Height: 5 ft 7 in (1.70 m)
- Position: Outside left

Youth career
- –1901: Boldon Royal Rovers
- 1901–1903: Whitburn
- 1903: Jarrow

Senior career*
Years	Team	Apps	(Gls)
1903–1906	Barnsley	75	(24)
1906–1919	Manchester United	287	(89)
1916–1917	→ Cowdenbeath (loan)		
1919–1921	Oldham Athletic	74	(12)
1921–1922	Hamilton Academical	34	(6)
1922–1923	Rochdale	30	(1)
1923–1926	Ashton National		
1926–1927	Manchester Ship Canal		

International career
1907–1913	England	7	(2)
1909–1912	The Football League XI	5	(0)
- * Club domestic league appearances and goals

George Wall (20 February 1885 – June 1962) was an English footballer.

== Career ==
Born in Boldon Colliery, County Durham, Wall started his career with Boldon Royal Rovers and played for Whitburn and Jarrow before joining Barnsley in 1903. In almost three years with Barnsley, Wall scored 24 league goals at a rate of almost one goal in every three games. In 1906, he transferred to Manchester United and helped them win the 1908 and 1911 league titles, as well as the 1909 FA Cup. He left the club in 1915 because of World War I and joined Oldham Athletic after the war in 1919.

During the First World War George Wall served in the Black Watch Regiment. After the war he was sold to Oldham Athletic for £200. While at Manchester United he had scored 100 goals, becoming just the third player in the history of the club to achieve this feat, after Joe Cassidy and Sandy Turnbull. On 21 November 1914, in a league match against Tottenham Hotspur he became club's top appearance maker, overtaking Fred Erentz with 311 games to his name. His total of 319 matches was Manchester United's record until 26 April 1920, when Billy Meredith made 320th of his 335 appearances for the club.

He then played for two seasons with Oldham, before travelling north of the border to Hamilton Academical. He returned to England to play for Rochdale a year later, but dropped out of league football in 1923, playing for Ashton National and Manchester Ship Canal. He retired in 1927.

Wall also won seven caps for England, scoring two goals.

== Personal life ==
Wall's brother Thomas was a reserve team player at Manchester United and was killed during the First World War. Wall died in Manchester, aged 77, in June 1962.

== Career statistics ==
Club	Season	Division	League		National Cup		Other		Total	
Club	Season	Division	Apps	Goals	Apps	Goals	Apps	Goals	Apps	Goals
Barnsley	1903–04	Second Division	16	4	0	0	—		16	4
Barnsley	1904–05	Second Division	30	6	1	0	—		31	6
Barnsley	1905–06	Second Division	31	14	4	1	—		35	15
Barnsley	Total		75	24	5	1	—		80	25
Manchester United	1905–06	Second Division	6	3	—		—		6	3
Manchester United	1906–07	First Division	38	11	2	2	—		40	13
Manchester United	1907–08	First Division	36	19	4	3	2 (Note: Appearance(s) in FA Charity Shield)	1	42	23
Manchester United	1908–09	First Division	34	11	6	0	—		40	11
Manchester United	1909–10	First Division	32	14	1	0	—		33	14
Manchester United	1910–11	First Division	26	5	3	1	—		29	6
Manchester United	1911–12	First Division	33	3	6	1	1	1	40	5
Manchester United	1912–13	First Division	36	10	5	2	—		41	12
Manchester United	1913–14	First Division	29	11	1	0	—		30	11
Manchester United	1914–15	First Division	17	2	1	0	—		18	2
Manchester United	Total		287	89	29	9	3	2	319	100
Oldham Athletic	1919–20	First Division	40	4	0	0	—		40	4
Oldham Athletic	1920–21	First Division	34	8	0	0	—		34	8
Oldham Athletic	Total		74	12	0	0	—		74	12
Hamilton Academical	1921–22	Scottish First Division	34	6	0	0	—		34	6
Rochdale	1922–23	Third Division North	30	1	1	0	—		31	1
Career total			502	132	37	10	3	2	542	144

== Honours ==
=== Club ===
Manchester United

- Football League First Division (2): 1907–08, 1910–11
- FA Cup (1): 1908–09
- FA Charity Shield (2): 1908, 1911

Cowdenbeath

- Eastern League (1): 1916–17

=== Individual ===
- Cowdenbeath Hall of Fame
