= John Hodge (Scottish footballer) =

Scottish footballer

Personal information
- Full name: John Hodge
- Place of birth: Stenhousemuir, Scotland
- Height: 5 ft 10 in (1.78 m)
- Position: Full-back

Senior career*
Years	Team	Apps	(Gls)
?–1913	Stenhousemuir		
1913–1919	Manchester United	30	(0)
- * Club domestic league appearances and goals

John Hodge was a Scottish footballer who played as a full-back. Born in Stenhousemuir, Scotland, he played for hometown club Stenhousemuir and for Manchester United (30 appearances in the English Football League over two seasons without scoring, before competitive football in England was suspended due to World War I), two clubs his brother Jimmy also played for.
