= 1911–12 Manchester United F.C. season =

English football club season

Manchester United
1911–12 season
- Chairman: John Henry Davies
- Manager: Ernest Mangnall
- First Division: 13th
- FA Cup: Fourth Round
- FA Charity Shield: Winners
- Top goalscorer: League: Enoch West (17); All: Enoch West (23)
- Highest home attendance: 59,300 vs Blackburn Rovers (9 March 1912)
- Lowest home attendance: 6,000 vs Bury (17 February 1912)
- Average home league attendance: 21,972
Home colours	Away colours

The 1911–12 season was Manchester United's 20th season in the Football League and fifth in the First Division.

== FA Charity Shield ==
Date	Opponents	H / A	Result F–A	Scorers	Attendance
25 September 1911	Swindon Town	N	8–4	Halse (6), Turnbull, Wall	10,000

== First Division ==
Date	Opponents	H / A	Result F–A	Scorers	Attendance	League position
2 September 1911	Manchester City	A	0–0		35,000	9th
9 September 1911	Everton	H	2–1	Halse, Turnbull	20,000	7th
16 September 1911	West Bromwich Albion	A	0–1		35,000	10th
23 September 1911	Sunderland	H	2–2	Stacey (2)	20,000	12th
30 September 1911	Blackburn Rovers	A	2–2	West (2)	30,000	12th
7 October 1911	Sheffield Wednesday	H	3–1	Halse (2), West	30,000	11th
14 October 1911	Bury	A	1–0	Turnbull	18,000	6th
21 October 1911	Middlesbrough	H	3–4	Halse, Turnbull, West	20,000	9th
28 October 1911	Notts County	A	1–0	Turnbull	15,000	7th
4 November 1911	Tottenham Hotspur	H	1–2	Halse	20,000	10th
11 November 1911	Preston North End	H	0–0		10,000	9th
18 November 1911	Liverpool	A	2–3	Roberts, West	15,000	13th
25 November 1911	Aston Villa	H	3–1	West (2), Roberts	20,000	8th
2 December 1911	Newcastle United	A	3–2	West (2), Halse	40,000	8th
9 December 1911	Sheffield United	H	1–0	Halse	12,000	7th
16 December 1911	Oldham Athletic	A	2–2	Turnbull, West	20,000	6th
23 December 1911	Bolton Wanderers	H	2–0	Halse, Turnbull	20,000	3rd
25 December 1911	Bradford City	H	0–1		50,000	6th
26 December 1911	Bradford City	A	1–0	West	40,000	2nd
30 December 1911	Manchester City	H	0–0		50,000	4th
1 January 1912	Arsenal	H	2–0	Meredith, West	20,000	3rd
6 January 1912	Everton	A	0–4		12,000	4th
20 January 1912	West Bromwich Albion	H	1–2	Wall	8,000	4th
27 January 1912	Sunderland	A	0–5		12,000	8th
10 February 1912	Sheffield Wednesday	A	0–3		25,000	9th
17 February 1912	Bury	H	0–0		6,000	10th
2 March 1912	Notts County	H	2–0	West (2)	10,000	10th
16 March 1912	Preston North End	A	0–0		7,000	12th
23 March 1912	Liverpool	H	1–1	Nuttall	10,000	12th
30 March 1912	Aston Villa	A	0–6		15,000	13th
5 April 1912	Arsenal	A	1–2	Turnbull	14,000	14th
6 April 1912	Newcastle United	H	0–2		14,000	16th
9 April 1912	Tottenham Hotspur	A	1–1	Wall	20,000	15th
13 April 1912	Sheffield United	A	1–6	Nuttall	7,000	17th
17 April 1912	Middlesbrough	A	0–3		5,000	17th
20 April 1912	Oldham Athletic	H	3–1	West (2), Wall	15,000	14th
27 April 1912	Bolton Wanderers	A	1–1	Meredith	20,000	16th
29 April 1912	Blackburn Rovers	H	3–1	Hamill, Meredith, West	20,000	13th

Pos	Team	Pld	W	D	L	GF	GA	GAv	Pts
11	Bradford City	38	15	8	15	46	50	0.920	38
12	Tottenham Hotspur	38	14	9	15	53	53	1.000	37
13	Manchester United	38	13	11	14	45	60	0.750	37
14	Sheffield United	38	13	10	15	63	56	1.125	36
15	Manchester City	38	13	9	16	56	58	0.966	35

Source: World Football
Rules for classification: 1) Points; 2) Goal average; 3) Goals scored

== FA Cup ==
Date	Round	Opponents	H / A	Result F–A	Scorers	Attendance
13 January 1912	First Round	Huddersfield Town	H	3–1	West (2), Halse	19,579
3 February 1912	Second Round	Coventry City	A	5–1	Halse (2), West (2), Turnbull	17,130
24 February 1912	Third Round	Reading	A	1–1	West	24,069
29 February 1912	Third Round; Replay	Reading	H	3–0	Turnbull (2), Halse	29,511
9 March 1912	Fourth Round	Blackburn Rovers	H	1–1	own goal	59,300
14 March 1912	Fourth Round; Replay	Blackburn Rovers	A	2–4	West (2)	39,296
