= Tom Wilcox =

English footballer (1879–1962)

Personal information
- Date of birth: 1879
- Place of birth: Born at sea
- Date of death: 1962 (aged 82–83)
- Position: Goalkeeper

Senior career*
Years	Team	Apps	(Gls)
	Millwall Athletic	?	(?)
	Cray Wanderers	?	(?)
1904–1905	Woolwich Arsenal	0	(0)
1905–1906	Norwich City	?	(?)
1906–1907	Blackpool	37	(0)
1907–1909	Manchester United	2	(0)
1909–1910	Carlisle United	?	(?)
1910–1912	Huddersfield Town	2	(0)
1912–?	Goole Town	?	(?)
	Abergavenny	?	(?)
- * Club domestic league appearances and goals

Thomas Walter J. Wilcox (1879–1962) was a professional footballer who played for Norwich City, Blackpool, Manchester United, Huddersfield Town and Carlisle United.
