= Frank Harris (footballer, born 1899) =

English footballer

Francis Edgar Harris (17 December 1899 – December 1983) was an English footballer. His regular position was at full back. He was born in Urmston, Manchester. He played for Manchester United.
