= Jimmy Turnbull =

Scottish footballer

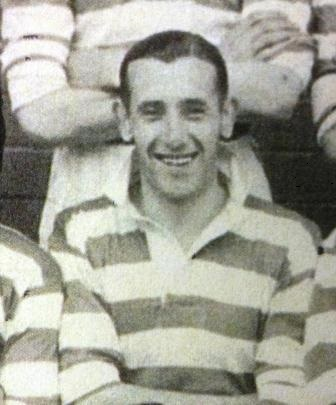

Personal information
- Full name: James McLachlan Turnbull
- Date of birth: 23 May 1882
- Place of birth: Bannockburn, Stirlingshire, Scotland
- Date of death: 19 September 1960 (aged 78)
- Place of death: Stretford, Lancashire, England
- Height: 5 ft 10 in (1.78 m)
- Position: Forward

Senior career*
Years	Team	Apps	(Gls)
- Stenhousemuir
1900–1901	East Stirlingshire	12	(11)
1901–1903	Dundee	25	(6)
1903–1904	Falkirk	16	(13)
1904	Rangers	1	(1)
1905–?	Preston North End	?	(?)
?–1907	Leyton	?	(?)
1907–1910	Manchester United	67	(36)
1910–1912	Bradford (Park Avenue)	?	(?)
1912–1913	Chelsea	20	(7)
- * Club domestic league appearances and goals

James McLachlan Turnbull (23 May 1882 – 19 September 1960) was a Scottish footballer who played as a forward, most notably for Manchester United, with whom he won the Football League and the FA Charity Shield in 1908 and the FA Cup in 1909. He was the first player to net a hat-trick in a Charity Shield game.

== Club career ==
Turnbull played for Scottish clubs East Stirlingshire, Dundee, Falkirk and Rangers, before moving to England to sign for Preston North End and later the now dissolved Leyton.

In May 1907, he was bought by Manchester United, where he won the 1907–08 Football League title, the 1908 FA Charity Shield and the 1908–09 FA Cup. He scored a total of 45 goals in 78 games for the club, with his best season being 1908–09, in which he scored 22 times in 28 appearances in all competitions. He was sold to Bradford Park Avenue in September 1910, and later played for Chelsea.

He played in the annual Home Scots v Anglo-Scots international trial match in 1911, but did not receive any other representative honours.

== Personal life ==
His elder brother Tom Turnbull was also a footballer who played as a defender, also featuring for Stenhousemuir, East Stirlingshire and Falkirk as well as Celtic and Sheffield United, but suffered a serious injury soon after joining the English club. Another brother, Alex, was one of Falkirk's early goalkeepers before emigrating to Canada.

== Honours ==
Manchester United

- Football League First Division: 1907–08
- FA Cup: 1908–09
- FA Community Shield: 1908
