= Tom Nuttall =

English footballer

Personal information
- Full name: Thomas Albert Bradshaw Nuttall
- Date of birth: February 1889
- Place of birth: Bolton, England
- Date of death: October 1963 (aged 74)
- Position: Forward

Senior career*
Years	Team	Apps	(Gls)
–1910	Heywood United		
1910–1913	Manchester United	16	(4)
1913–1914	Everton	19	(7)
- Northwich Victoria
- Rochdale
1919–1920	St Mirren	11	(0)
1920–1921	Southend United	57	(10)
- Leyland
- Northwich Victoria
- Eccles United
- Chorley
- * Club domestic league appearances and goals

Thomas Albert Bradshaw Nuttall (February 1889 – October 1963) was an English professional footballer who played as a forward in the Football League for Southend United, Everton and Manchester United.

== Personal life ==
Nuttall served as a lance bombardier in the Royal Garrison Artillery during the First World War.

== Career statistics ==
Appearances and goals by club, season and competition
Club	Season	League			National Cup		Total	
Club	Season	Division	Apps	Goals	Apps	Goals	Apps	Goals
Manchester United	1910–11	First Division	6	2	0	0	6	2
Manchester United	1911–12	First Division	10	2	0	0	10	2
Manchester United	Total		16	4	0	0	16	4
Everton	1913–14	First Division	14	7	0	0	14	7
Everton	1914–15	First Division	5	0	0	0	5	0
Everton	Total		19	7	0	0	19	7
St Mirren	1919–20	Scottish First Division	11	0	0	0	11	0
Career total			46	11	0	0	46	11
