= Ernest Thomson =

English footballer

Ernest Thomson (born 1884) was an English footballer. His regular position was at full back. He played for Manchester United, Darwen, and Nelson.
