= John Broster (footballer) =

English footballer (1889–1959)

Personal information
- Date of birth: 4 January 1889
- Place of birth: Warrington, England
- Date of death: 1959 (aged 69–70)
- Position: Wing-half

Senior career*
Years	Team	Apps	(Gls)
1907	Newton-le-Willows		
1908	Earlestown		
1911	Chorley		
1912	Queens Park Rangers		
1921	Rochdale	1	(0)
1921-1922	Wigan Borough	31	(3)
1922-1923	Rochdale	8	(0)
1923	Earlestown LMS		
Total		40	(3)
- * Club domestic league appearances and goals

John Broster (4 January 1889 – 1959) was an English footballer who played for Rochdale and Wigan Borough
