= Arthur Ormston =

English footballer (1900–1947)

Personal information
- Date of birth: 3 June 1900
- Place of birth: Alnwick, England
- Date of death: 13 October 1947 (aged 47)
- Place of death: Oldham, England
- Position: Centre-forward

Senior career*
| Years | Team | Apps | (Gls) |
| ????–1920 | Radcliffe Welfare United | | |
| 1920–1921 | South Shields | 0 | (0) |
| 1921–1922 | Chesterfield | 22 | (6) |
| 1922–1923 | Durham City | 16 | (2) |
| 1923 | Coventry City | 3 | (0) |
| 1923–1924 | Barrow | 32 | (10) |
| 1924–1925 | Wigan Borough | 19 | (5) |
| 1925–1926 | Oldham Athletic | 40 | (22) |
| 1926–1927 | Bradford City | 14 | (6) |
| 1927–1928 | Bristol Rovers | 27 | (15) |
| 1928–1929 | Oldham Athletic | 3 | (0) |
| 1929–1930 | Blyth Spartans | | |
| 1930–1931 | Stalybridge Celtic | | |
| 1931–1932 | Macclesfield | 5 | (4) |
- * Club domestic league appearances and goals

Arthur Ormston (born 3 June 1900 in Alnwick) was an English footballer, who played for eight different clubs in the Football League during the interwar period.

After brief spells with Radcliffe Welfare United and South Shields, Ormston made his Football League debut with Chesterfield during the 1921–22 season. He went on to play for Durham City, Coventry City, Barrow, Wigan Borough, Oldham Athletic, Bradford City, Bristol Rovers and Oldham again, all in quick succession. After this he dropped out of the League and made further appearances for Blyth Spartans, Stalybridge Celtic and Macclesfield.

== Personal life ==
Ormston was born in 1900 in Alnwick, Northumberland, the son of William and Mary Ormston. He had two older brothers, Albert and Ernest, and began attending Warkworth County First School in 1905.

He died on 13 October 1947 in Oldham, aged 47.
