= Joe Ford (footballer) =

English footballer

Personal information
- Full name: Joseph Bertram Ford
- Date of birth: 7 May 1886
- Place of birth: Northwich, Cheshire, England
- Height: 5 ft 10 1/2 in (1.79 m)
- Position: Outside left

Senior career*
Years	Team	Apps	(Gls)
- Witton Albion
- Crewe Alexandra
1907–1910	Manchester United	5	(0)
1910–1914	Nottingham Forest	102	(12)
1914–?	Goole Town		
- * Club domestic league appearances and goals

Joseph Bertram Ford (7 May 1886 – after 1914) was an English footballer. His regular position was as a forward. He was born in Northwich, Cheshire. He played for Witton Albion, Crewe Alexandra, Manchester United, Nottingham Forest, and Goole Town.
