= Joe Curry =

English footballer (1887–1936)

Personal information
- Full name: Joseph Curry
- Date of birth: January quarter, 1887
- Place of birth: Newcastle upon Tyne, England
- Date of death: 1 April 1936 (aged 49)
- Place of death: Hexham, England
- Position: Half-back

Youth career
- Scotswood

Senior career*
Years	Team	Apps	(Gls)
1908–1911	Manchester United	13	(0)
1911–1912	Southampton	7	(0)
1913–?	West Stanley		
- * Club domestic league appearances and goals

Joseph Curry (1887 – 1 April 1936) was an English footballer who played at full-back for Manchester United and Southampton in the early 20th century.

== Football career ==
Born in Newcastle upon Tyne, Curry started his career at Scotswood, before joining Manchester United in February 1908. Over the next three years, he spent most of the time in the reserves, but made a total of 14 first-team appearances.

Curry joined Southampton from Manchester United in May 1911. He found few opportunities to break into the first team as the Saints struggled near the foot of the Southern League First Division and was used as cover for Jim McAlpine. Even when he did manage to play, he had a propensity to get injured and struggled to get fit. After a frustrating season, he retired from the professional game and returned to his native north-east where he turned out occasionally for West Stanley.
