= Jack Yarwood =

English footballer

Personal information
- Full name: John Wright Yarwood
- Date of birth: 21 September 1891
- Place of birth: Stockport, England
- Date of death: 1964 (aged 72–73)
- Position: Centre-half

Senior career*
Years	Team	Apps	(Gls)
1913	Merthyr Town		
1921–1922	Rochdale	12	(0)
- * Club domestic league appearances and goals

John Wright Yarwood (21 Sep 1891–1964) was an English footballer who played as a centre-half for Rochdale when they joined the English Football League in 1921.
