= Harry Dennison =

English footballer

Personal information
- Full name: Harry Dennison
- Date of birth: 4 November 1894
- Place of birth: Bradford, England
- Date of death: 15 December 1947 (aged 53)
- Place of death: Blackburn, England
- Height: 5 ft 8 in (1.73 m)
- Position: Inside forward

Senior career*
Years	Team	Apps	(Gls)
1911–1920	Blackburn Rovers	3	(0)
1921–1922	Rochdale	33	(17)
1922–1923	Wigan Borough	30	(13)
1924–1925	Stockport County	11	(3)
- * Club domestic league appearances and goals

Harry Dennison (4 November 1894 – 15 December 1947) was an English footballer who played as a forward for Blackburn Rovers, Rochdale, Wigan Borough and Stockport County.

Dennison made his debut for Blackburn Rovers (against Bristol City) on 8 April 1911, aged 16 years and 155 days old, making him the youngest person to play for the club.
