= Aaron Hulme =

English footballer

Personal information
- Date of birth: Q2 1883
- Place of birth: Manchester, England
- Date of death: 1933 (aged 49–50)
- Position: Full back

Youth career
- Newton Heath Athletic
- 1904: Colne

Senior career*
Years	Team	Apps	(Gls)
1904–1906	Oldham Athletic		
1906–1909	Manchester United	4	(0)
1909–1910	Nelson		
1910–1912	Hyde		
1912–1913	St Helens Recreation		
1913–?	Newton Heath Athletic		
- * Club domestic league appearances and goals

Aaron Hulme (April 1886 – November 1933) was an English footballer. His regular position was at full back. He was born in Manchester. He played for Manchester United, Newton Heath Athletic, Colne, Oldham Athletic, and Nelson.
