= Tommy Gipps =

English footballer

Personal information
- Full name: Thomas Savill Gipps
- Date of birth: 1888
- Place of birth: Walthamstow, England
- Date of death: 7 January 1956 (aged 67–68)
- Place of death: Walthamstow, England
- Height: 5 ft 7 in (1.70 m)
- Position: Half back

Senior career*
Years	Team	Apps	(Gls)
–1907	Walthamstow Imperial		
1907–1911	Tottenham Hotspur	1	(0)
1911–1912	Barrow		
1912–1920	Manchester United	23	(0)
- * Club domestic league appearances and goals

Thomas Savill Gipps (1888 – 7 January 1956) was an English professional footballer who played as a half back in the Football League for Manchester United.

== Personal life ==
Gipps brother was also a footballer. In mid-1916, during the middle of the First World War, Gipps enlisted as a private in the Army Service Corps.

== Career statistics ==
Appearances and goals by club, season and competition
Club	Season	League			FA Cup		Other		Total	
Club	Season	Division	Apps	Goals	Apps	Goals	Apps	Goals	Apps	Goals
Tottenham Hotspur	1907–08	Southern League First Division	0	0	0	0	1 (Note: Appearance in Western League)	0	1	0
Manchester United	1912–13	First Division	2	0	0	0	—		2	0
Manchester United	1913–14	First Division	11	0	0	0	—		11	0
Manchester United	1914–15	First Division	10	0	0	0	—		10	0
Manchester United	Total		23	0	0	0	—		23	0
Career total			23	0	0	0	1	0	24	0
