= William Clifton (footballer) =

English footballer

Personal information
- Full name: William Clifton
- Date of birth: 1891
- Place of birth: Leyland, Lancashire, England
- Date of death: 1953 (aged 61–62)
- Height: 5 ft 7 in (1.70 m)
- Position: Winger

Senior career*
| Years | Team | Apps | (Gls) |
| 1913 | Leyland | | |
| 1915-1920 | Preston North End | 4 | (0) |
| 1921-1922 | Rochdale | 13 | (0) |
| Total | | 17 | (0) |
- * Club domestic league appearances and goals

William Clifton (1891–1953) was an English footballer who played for Preston North End and Rochdale.
