= David Christie (footballer, born 1885) =

Scottish footballer

Personal information
- Full name: David Christie
- Date of birth: 1885
- Date of death: Unknown
- Height: 5 ft 10 in (1.78 m)
- Position: Inside left

Senior career*
Years	Team	Apps	(Gls)
?–1907	Hurlford		
1907–1909	Manchester United	2	(0)
Total		2	(0)
- * Club domestic league appearances and goals

David Christie (1885 – unknown) was a Scottish footballer who played as a forward. He began his career with Hurlford, but moved to England in October 1907 to sign for Manchester United. After spending almost a year playing for the reserve team, he made his Football League debut in a 2–1 home win over Bury on 7 September 1908, after both Jack Picken and Sandy Turnbull were ruled out through injury; according to a match report by the Manchester Football Chronicle, Christie missed two goalscoring chances that "would just have suited Sandy".

Christie's only other first-team appearance for the club came later that same season in a 3–2 away defeat to Leicester Fosse on 17 April 1909. He was transfer listed at the end of the following season, but was unable to find a new club after Manchester United refused to lower their transfer fee demands. His movements went untracked for the next 14 years, until he was reported to be coaching Australian side Granville in north Sydney.
