= Sammy McClure =

English footballer

Personal information
- Full name: Samuel McClure
- Date of birth: 11 February 1878
- Place of birth: Workington, England
- Date of death: 17 July 1906 (aged 28)
- Place of death: Blackburn, England
- Position: Centre half

Senior career*
Years	Team	Apps	(Gls)
1897–1898	Black Diamonds		
1899–1906	Blackburn Rovers	144	(12)
Total		144	(12)
- * Club domestic league appearances and goals

Samuel McClure (11 February 1878 – 17 July 1906) was an English footballer who played in the Football League for Blackburn Rovers. He died from an abscess.
