= 1910–11 Manchester United F.C. season =

English football club season

Manchester United
1910–11 season
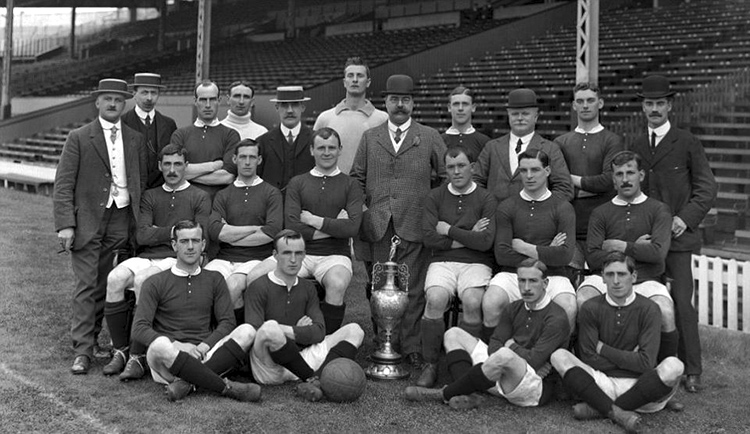
- The 1910–11 Manchester United team and staff with Football League First Division trophy
- Chairman: John Henry Davies
- Manager: Ernest Mangnall
- First Division: 1st
- FA Cup: Third Round
- Top goalscorer: League: Enoch West (19); All: Enoch West (20)
- Highest home attendance: 65,101 vs Aston Villa (4 February 1911)
- Lowest home attendance: 7,000 vs Bury (3 December 1910)
- Average home league attendance: 29,055
Home colours	Away colours

The 1910–11 season was Manchester United's 19th season in the Football League and fourth in the First Division.

== First Division ==
Date	Opponents	H / A	Result F–A	Scorers	Attendance
1 September 1910	Arsenal	A	2–1	Halse, West	15,000
3 September 1910	Blackburn Rovers	H	3–2	Meredith, Turnbull, West	40,000
10 September 1910	Nottingham Forest	A	1–2	Turnbull	20,000
17 September 1910	Manchester City	H	2–1	Turnbull, West	60,000
24 September 1910	Everton	A	1–0	Turnbull	25,000
1 October 1910	Sheffield Wednesday	H	3–2	Wall (2), West	25,000
8 October 1910	Bristol City	A	1–0	Halse	20,000
15 October 1910	Newcastle United	H	2–0	Halse, Turnbull	50,000
22 October 1910	Tottenham Hotspur	A	2–2	West (2)	30,000
29 October 1910	Middlesbrough	H	1–2	Turnbull	35,000
5 November 1910	Preston North End	A	2–0	Turnbull, West	13,000
12 November 1910	Notts County	H	0–0		13,000
19 November 1910	Oldham Athletic	A	3–1	Turnbull (2), Wall	25,000
26 November 1910	Liverpool	A	2–3	Roberts, Turnbull	8,000
3 December 1910	Bury	H	3–2	Homer (2), Turnbull	7,000
10 December 1910	Sheffield United	A	0–2		8,000
17 December 1910	Aston Villa	H	2–0	Turnbull, West	20,000
24 December 1910	Sunderland	A	2–1	Meredith, Turnbull	30,000
26 December 1910	Arsenal	H	5–0	Picken (2), West (2), Meredith	40,000
27 December 1910	Bradford City	A	0–1		35,000
31 December 1910	Blackburn Rovers	A	0–1		20,000
2 January 1911	Bradford City	H	1–0	Meredith	40,000
7 January 1911	Nottingham Forest	H	4–2	Homer, Picken, Wall, own goal	10,000
21 January 1911	Manchester City	A	1–1	Turnbull	40,000
28 January 1911	Everton	H	2–2	Duckworth, Wall	45,000
11 February 1911	Bristol City	H	3–1	Homer, Picken, West	14,000
18 February 1911	Newcastle United	A	1–0	Halse	45,000
4 March 1911	Middlesbrough	A	2–2	Turnbull, West	8,000
11 March 1911	Preston North End	H	5–0	West (2), Connor, Duckworth, Turnbull	25,000
15 March 1911	Tottenham Hotspur	H	3–2	Meredith, Turnbull, West	10,000
18 March 1911	Notts County	A	0–1		12,000
25 March 1911	Oldham Athletic	H	0–0		35,000
1 April 1911	Liverpool	H	2–0	West (2)	20,000
8 April 1911	Bury	A	3–0	Homer (2), Halse	20,000
15 April 1911	Sheffield United	H	1–1	West	22,000
17 April 1911	Sheffield Wednesday	A	0–0		25,000
22 April 1911	Aston Villa	A	2–4	Halse (2)	50,000
29 April 1911	Sunderland	H	5–1	Halse (2), Turnbull, West, own goal	10,000

Pos	Team	Pld	W	D	L	GF	GA	GAv	Pts
1	Manchester United (C)	38	22	8	8	72	40	1.800	52
2	Aston Villa	38	22	7	9	69	41	1.683	51
3	Sunderland	38	15	15	8	67	48	1.396	45
4	Everton	38	19	7	12	50	36	1.389	45
5	Bradford City	38	20	5	13	51	42	1.214	45

Source: World Football
Rules for classification: 1) Points; 2) Goal average; 3) Goals scored
(C) Champions

== FA Cup ==
Date	Round	Opponents	H / A	Result F–A	Scorers	Attendance
14 January 1911	First Round	Blackpool	A	2–1	Picken, West	12,000
4 February 1911	Second Round	Aston Villa	H	2–1	Halse, Wall	65,101
25 February 1911	Third Round	West Ham United	A	1–2	Turnbull	26,000
