= George Bissett (footballer) =

Scottish footballer

Personal information
- Full name: George Bissett
- Date of birth: 25 January 1896
- Place of birth: Cowdenbeath, Scotland
- Date of death: 1946 (aged 49–50)
- Height: 5 ft 7 in (1.70 m)
- Position: Forward

Youth career
- Glencraig Thistle

Senior career*
Years	Team	Apps	(Gls)
1916–1919	Third Lanark	59	(8)
1919–1921	Manchester United	40	(10)
1921–1924	Wolverhampton Wanderers	41	(10)
1924	Pontypridd		
1924–1926	Southend United		
- * Club domestic league appearances and goals

George Bissett (25 January 1896 – 1946) was a Scottish footballer who played as a forward, most notably for Manchester United and Wolverhampton Wanderers.

== Career ==
Born in Cowdenbeath, Bissett played for Glencraig Thistle and Third Lanark in his native Scotland before moving to Manchester United in 1919. He made his Football League debut on 15 November 1919 in a 1–0 loss at Burnley and remained at Old Trafford for two years, scoring 10 goals in 42 appearances.

In November 1921, he transferred to Wolverhampton Wanderers, where he made his debut on 3 December 1921 in a 2–0 win at Port Vale. He remained a first choice player for the remainder of the season, scoring nine times in 29 games. However, the appointment of George Jobey as manager during the 1922–23 season saw Bissett's opportunities decline and he featured only sporadically in that campaign.

He left to join Welsh League club Pontypridd in January 1924, but moved to Southend United four months later before retiring in 1926. He died in 1946.
