= Tom Homer (footballer) =

English footballer

Personal information
- Full name: Thomas Percy Homer
- Date of birth: April 1886
- Place of birth: Winson Green, Warwickshire, England
- Date of death: Unknown
- Position: Forward

Senior career*
Years	Team	Apps	(Gls)
- Soho Caledonians
- Erdington
- Aston Villa
- Stourbridge
- Kidderminster Harriers
1909–1912	Manchester United	25	(14)
- * Club domestic league appearances and goals

Thomas Percy Homer (April 1886 – ?) was an English footballer who played as a forward. Born in Winson Green, Warwickshire. He played for Soho Caledonians, Erdington, Aston Villa, Stourbridge, Kidderminster Harriers and Manchester United.
