= Harold Halse =

English footballer

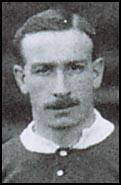

Personal information
- Full name: Harold James Halse
- Date of birth: 1 January 1886
- Place of birth: Stratford, London, England
- Date of death: 25 March 1949 (aged 63)
- Place of death: Colchester, Essex, England
- Height: 1.73 m (5 ft 8 in)
- Position: Forward

Youth career
- Wanstead
- Newportians
- Barking Town

Senior career*
Years	Team	Apps	(Gls)
1905–1906	Clapton Orient	2	(1)
1906–1907	Southend United	65	(91)
1908–1912	Manchester United	109	(41)
1912–1913	Aston Villa	31	(21)
1913–1921	Chelsea	96	(23)
1921–1923	Charlton Athletic	21	(5)
Total		324	(182)

International career
1909	England	1	(2)
- * Club domestic league appearances and goals

Harold James Halse (1 January 1886 – 25 March 1949) was an English football forward, who played most of his career for Manchester United and then for Chelsea. He was the first player to appear in three FA Cup finals for three clubs. He is also the highest scoring player in a Charity Shield match, having scored six goals in the 1911 edition for Manchester United.

== Career ==
He was born in Stratford, London and started his football career as an amateur with Wanstead, Newportians, Barking Town and Clapton Orient, where he made two appearances with one goal in the Football League.

On 21 July 1906 he signed for Southend United ahead of their first professional season in the Second Division of the Southern League, scoring 91 goals in 65 appearances in just under two seasons. He transferred to Manchester United in March 1908 for the maximum transfer fee allowed at that time, £350. He scored 56 goals in 125 appearances for United, who won the First Division title in 1908 and 1911, and the FA Cup in 1909. In the 1911 FA Charity Shield against Swindon Town, Halse scored six goals for United in an 8–4 win for his team.

He moved to Aston Villa for £1200 in 1912. He won the 1913 FA Cup with Villa and also scored all five goals when Aston Villa beat Derby County 5–1, but signed for Chelsea shortly afterwards. While at Chelsea Halse once again reached an FA Cup final, in 1915, although this time he finished on the losing side. He remained with Chelsea until 1921, scoring 25 goals in 111 games, and had a spell at Charlton Athletic before retiring in 1923.

Halse was the first player to appear in three FA Cup finals for three clubs.

Halse was capped once for England, in an 8–1 win over Austria on 1 June 1909. He scored twice in this game.

He died on 25 March 1949, aged 63, and was buried at Walton-on-the-Naze Cemetery.

== Honours ==
Manchester United

- Football League First Division: 1907–08, 1910–11
- FA Cup: 1908–09
- FA Charity Shield: 1911

Aston Villa

- FA Cup: 1912–13

Chelsea

- FA Cup runner-up: 1914–15
