= Enoch West =

English footballer

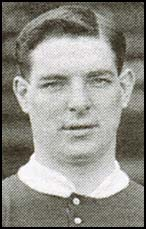

Personal information
- Full name: Enoch James West
- Date of birth: 31 March 1886
- Place of birth: Hucknall Torkard, England
- Date of death: 1965 (aged 78–79)
- Height: 5 ft 8 in (1.73 m)
- Position: Centre-forward

Senior career*
Years	Team	Apps	(Gls)
1903–1905	Sheffield United	0	(0)
1905–1910	Nottingham Forest	168	(94)
1910–1915	Manchester United	166	(72)
Total		334	(166)
- * Club domestic league appearances and goals

Enoch James West (31 March 1886 – September 1965), nicknamed Knocker, was an English footballer who played as a centre forward for Nottingham Forest and Manchester United before being banned due to his part in the 1915 British football match-fixing scandal.

West was born in Hucknall Torkard in Nottinghamshire. He started his career for Sheffield United but failed to break into the first team.

== Club career ==
=== Nottingham Forest ===
He transferred in 1905 for a fee of £5 to Nottingham Forest and made his debut on 16 September 1905 in the 3–2 victory at home to Bury.

West scored 14 league goals in his first season (1905/06) as Forest were relegated to the Second Division on goal difference. In his second season (1906/07) Forest finished top of the Second Division partly due to West's 14 league goals.

He top scored in 1907/08 (29 league goals) and 1908/09 (22 league goals) outscoring Grenville Morris.

In the 1907/08 season he scored four First Division hat-tricks including all four goals in the game against Sunderland on 9 November 1907. The other hat-tricks were against Chelsea, Blackburn Rovers and Everton.

On 13 March 1909 West became the first ever player to be sent off for Nottingham Forest while playing against Derby County in the FA Cup 4th Round by referee T. Kirkham.

He scored a hat-trick against Leicester Fosse on 21 April 1909 in Forest's record league win, a 12–0 victory (Alf Spouncer and Hooper also scored three whilst Grenville Morris scored two).

West's last game for Nottingham Forest was on 30 April 1910 away to Bristol City.

=== Manchester United ===
In 1910, he transferred to Manchester United. He helped the club win the 1911 league medal. He scored 80 goals in his Manchester United career, his most successful season being the 1911–12 season when he scored a total of 23 goals; 17 in the league and six in the FA Cup, although United failed to win either of these competitions.

In 1915, he was banned for life by the Football Association, along with three other United players and four Liverpool players after being found guilty of match fixing. West protested his innocence, but his ban was not lifted until 1945. His suspension, which lasted 30 years, was the longest in Football League history. As he was 59 by the time his ban was lifted, he was never involved in football again.

West died in 1965, at the age of 79.

== Career statistics ==
Club	Season	League			FA Cup		Total	
Club	Season	Division	Apps	Goals	Apps	Goals	Apps	Goals
Sheffield United	1903–04	First Division	0	0	0	0	0	0
Sheffield United	1904–05	First Division	0	0	0	0	0	0
Sheffield United	Total		0	0	0	0	0	0
Nottingham Forest	1905–06	First Division	35	14	4	3	39	17
Nottingham Forest	1906–07	Second Division	33	14	2	0	35	14
Nottingham Forest	1907–08	First Division	36	29	1	0	37	29
Nottingham Forest	1908–09	First Division	33	22	4	3	37	25
Nottingham Forest	1909–10	First Division	31	16	4	2	35	18
Nottingham Forest	Total		168	94	15	8	183	102
Manchester United.	1910–11	First Division	35	19	3	1	38	20
Manchester United.	1911–12	First Division	32	17	6	6	38	23
Manchester United.	1913–13	First Division	36	21	4	1	40	22
Manchester United.	1913–14	First Division	30	6	1	0	31	6
Manchester United.	1914–15	First Division	33	9	1	0	34	9
Manchester United.	Total		166	72	15	8	181	80
Career total			334	166	30	16	364	182
