= George Anderson (footballer, born 1891) =

English footballer (1891–1959)

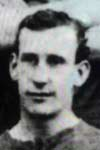

Personal information
- Full name: George Walter Anderson
- Date of birth: 25 May 1891
- Place of birth: Cheetham, Manchester, England
- Date of death: 1959 (aged 67–68)
- Position: Centre forward

Youth career
- Broughton St. James'
- Broughton Wellington
- Salford United

Senior career*
Years	Team	Apps	(Gls)
1910–1911	Bury	3	(0)
1911–1917	Manchester United	80	(37)
Total		83	(37)
- * Club domestic league appearances and goals

George Walter Anderson (25 May 1891 – 1959) was an English footballer who played as a forward. Born in Cheetham, Manchester, he began his career with local clubs Broughton St. James', Broughton Wellington and Salford United, before joining Bury in 1910. A year later, he was signed by Manchester United. Anderson went on to score 39 goals for United, and scored another 39 unofficial goals during the First World War.

Anderson was involved in a match-fixing scandal that ended his career. In a game against Burnley at Old Trafford on 29 December 1917, he was accused of fixing the match after three United players complained to the team president. He was banned from Old Trafford on 8 January 1918 and later sentenced to eight months in prison after a trial in Liverpool. Anderson had already testified during the investigation of the 1915 British football betting scandal, which led to the banning of seven Manchester United and Liverpool players.

He is buried in Blackley Cemetery.
