= 1907–08 Football League =

20th season of the Football League

The Football League
- Season: 1907–08
- Champions: Manchester United
- Relegated: Lincoln City
- Resigned: Stoke
- New clubs in league: Fulham; Oldham Athletic

The 1907–08 Football League season was the 20th season of The Football League.

This season saw the only occasion in history of the Football League where two teams have finished with exactly identical records (12 wins, 12 draws, 14 losses, 51 goals scored, 63 goals conceded), resulting in a tied 14th place between Woolwich Arsenal and Blackburn Rovers.

== Final league tables ==
Beginning in the 1894–95 season, clubs finishing level on points were separated according to goal average (goals scored divided by goals conceded). In case one or more teams had the same goal difference, this system favoured those teams who had scored fewer goals. The goal average system was eventually scrapped beginning with the 1976–77 season.

During the first six seasons of the league, (up to the 1893–94 season), re-election process concerned the clubs which finished in the bottom four of the league. From the 1894–95 season and until the 1920–21 season the re-election process was required of the clubs which finished in the bottom three of the league.

== First Division ==
First Division
- Season: 1907–08
- Champions: Manchester United; 1st English title
- Relegated: Bolton Wanderers; Birmingham
- Matches: 380
- Goals: 1,176 (3.09 per match)
- Top goalscorer: Enoch West (27 goals)
- Biggest home win: Newcastle United 8–0 Birmingham (23 November 1907)
- Biggest away win: Newcastle United 1–6 Manchester United (12 October 1907)
- Highest scoring: Liverpool 7–4 Manchester United (25 March 1908)

Pos	Team	Pld	W	D	L	GF	GA	GAv	Pts	Relegation
1	Manchester United (C)	38	23	6	9	81	48	1.688	52	
2	Aston Villa	38	17	9	12	77	59	1.305	43	
3	Manchester City	38	16	11	11	62	54	1.148	43	
4	Newcastle United	38	15	12	11	65	54	1.204	42	
5	The Wednesday	38	19	4	15	73	64	1.141	42	
6	Middlesbrough	38	17	7	14	54	45	1.200	41	
7	Bury	38	14	11	13	58	61	0.951	39	
8	Liverpool	38	16	6	16	68	61	1.115	38	
9	Nottingham Forest	38	13	11	14	59	62	0.952	37	
10	Bristol City	38	12	12	14	58	61	0.951	36	
11	Everton	38	15	6	17	58	64	0.906	36	
12	Preston North End	38	12	12	14	47	53	0.887	36	
13	Chelsea	38	14	8	16	53	62	0.855	36	
14	Blackburn Rovers	38	12	12	14	51	63	0.810	36	
15	Woolwich Arsenal	38	12	12	14	51	63	0.810	36	
16	Sunderland	38	16	3	19	78	75	1.040	35	
17	Sheffield United	38	12	11	15	52	58	0.897	35	
18	Notts County	38	13	8	17	39	51	0.765	34	
19	Bolton Wanderers (R)	38	14	5	19	52	58	0.897	33	Relegation to the Second Division
20	Birmingham (R)	38	9	12	17	40	60	0.667	30	Relegation to the Second Division

Source: World Football
Rules for classification: 1) Points; 2) Goal average; 3) Goals scored
(C) Champions; (R) Relegated

=== Results ===
Home \ Away	AST	BIR	BLB	BOL	BRI	BRY	CHE	EVE	LIV	MCI	MUN	MID	NEW	NOT	NTC	PNE	SHU	SUN	WED	WOO
Aston Villa		2–3	1–1	2–0	4–4	2–2	0–0	0–2	5–1	2–2	1–4	6–0	3–3	4–0	5–1	3–0	1–0	1–0	5–0	0–1
Birmingham	2–3		1–1	2–1	0–4	0–1	1–1	2–1	1–1	2–1	3–4	1–4	1–1	1–0	0–0	2–0	0–0	0–2	2–1	1–2
Blackburn Rovers	2–0	1–0		3–2	4–1	1–0	2–0	2–0	1–3	0–0	1–5	2–0	1–1	3–3	1–1	1–1	3–3	4–2	2–0	1–1
Bolton Wanderers	3–1	1–0	3–1		1–2	3–6	1–2	3–0	0–4	2–0	2–2	1–1	4–0	1–0	0–1	2–0	1–1	2–3	2–1	3–1
Bristol City	2–2	0–0	2–2	2–0		1–1	0–0	3–2	2–0	2–1	1–1	0–1	1–1	3–0	2–1	1–3	3–2	3–0	0–2	1–2
Bury	2–1	1–0	1–1	2–2	1–1		1–1	3–0	3–1	0–0	0–1	1–4	1–2	0–0	0–0	5–1	3–2	2–1	0–2	3–2
Chelsea	1–3	2–2	1–0	1–3	4–1	3–4		2–1	0–2	2–2	1–4	1–0	2–0	0–4	1–2	0–0	2–4	2–1	3–1	2–1
Everton	1–0	4–1	4–1	2–1	0–0	6–1	0–3		2–4	3–3	1–3	2–1	2–0	1–0	1–0	2–1	2–1	0–3	0–0	1–1
Liverpool	5–0	3–4	2–0	1–0	3–1	2–1	1–4	0–0		0–1	7–4	0–1	1–5	0–0	6–0	1–2	3–0	1–0	3–0	4–1
Manchester City	3–2	2–1	2–0	1–0	0–0	2–2	0–3	4–2	1–1		0–0	2–1	1–0	4–2	2–1	5–0	0–2	0–0	3–2	4–0
Manchester United	1–2	1–0	1–2	2–1	2–1	2–1	1–0	4–3	4–0	3–1		2–1	1–1	4–0	0–1	2–1	2–1	3–0	4–1	4–2
Middlesbrough	0–1	1–0	3–0	0–1	0–2	0–2	3–1	0–2	3–1	2–0	2–1		2–1	1–1	3–1	1–0	2–0	3–1	6–1	0–0
Newcastle United	2–5	8–0	3–0	3–0	2–0	3–0	1–0	2–1	3–1	1–1	1–6	1–1		3–0	1–1	0–0	2–3	1–3	2–1	2–1
Nottingham Forest	2–2	1–1	3–2	1–0	3–1	1–2	6–0	5–2	3–1	3–1	2–0	0–3	0–0		2–0	2–2	1–1	4–1	2–2	1–0
Notts County	0–3	0–0	0–2	0–1	3–1	2–1	2–0	2–1	2–2	1–0	1–1	2–0	0–1	2–0		0–1	0–3	4–0	1–2	2–0
Preston North End	3–0	1–1	1–1	2–0	3–0	3–1	2–4	2–2	3–0	2–4	0–0	1–1	2–0	0–1	1–0		0–0	3–2	1–1	3–0
Sheffield United	1–1	1–0	4–2	1–0	2–0	0–2	0–3	2–0	0–0	1–2	2–0	0–0	1–1	2–2	0–1	2–0		5–3	1–3	2–2
Sunderland	3–0	1–0	4–0	1–2	3–3	6–2	3–0	1–2	1–0	2–5	1–2	0–0	2–4	7–2	4–3	4–1	4–1		1–2	5–2
The Wednesday	2–3	1–4	2–0	5–2	5–3	2–0	3–1	1–2	1–2	5–1	2–0	3–2	3–1	2–1	2–0	1–0	2–0	2–3		6–0
Woolwich Arsenal	0–1	1–1	2–0	1–1	0–4	0–0	0–0	2–1	2–1	2–1	1–0	4–1	2–2	3–1	1–1	1–1	5–1	4–0	1–1	

Updated to match(es) played on unknown. Source:
Legend: Blue = home team win; Yellow = draw; Red = away team win.

=== Maps ===
Locations of the Football League First Division teams

== Second Division ==
Football League Second Division
- Season: 1907–08
- Champions: Bradford City (1st title)
- Failed re-election: Lincoln City
- Matches: 380
- Goals: 1,187 (3.12 per match)
- Top goalscorer: John Smith (Hull City), 27

Pos	Team	Pld	W	D	L	GF	GA	GAv	Pts	Promotion or relegation
1	Bradford City (C, P)	38	24	6	8	90	42	2.143	54	Promotion to the First Division
2	Leicester Fosse (P)	38	21	10	7	72	47	1.532	52	Promotion to the First Division
3	Oldham Athletic	38	22	6	10	76	42	1.810	50	
4	Fulham	38	22	5	11	82	49	1.673	49	
5	West Bromwich Albion	38	19	9	10	61	39	1.564	47	
6	Derby County	38	21	4	13	77	45	1.711	46	
7	Burnley	38	20	6	12	67	50	1.340	46	
8	Hull City	38	21	4	13	73	62	1.177	46	
9	Wolverhampton Wanderers	38	15	7	16	50	45	1.111	37	
10	Stoke (R)	38	16	5	17	57	52	1.096	37	Resigned from the league
11	Gainsborough Trinity	38	14	7	17	47	71	0.662	35	
12	Leeds City	38	12	8	18	53	65	0.815	32	
13	Stockport County	38	12	8	18	48	67	0.716	32	
14	Clapton Orient	38	11	10	17	40	65	0.615	32	
15	Blackpool	38	11	9	18	51	58	0.879	31	
16	Barnsley	38	12	6	20	54	68	0.794	30	
17	Glossop	38	11	8	19	54	74	0.730	30	
18	Grimsby Town	38	11	8	19	43	71	0.606	30	Re-elected
19	Chesterfield Town	38	6	11	21	46	92	0.500	23	Re-elected
20	Lincoln City (R)	38	9	3	26	46	83	0.554	21	Failed re-election and demoted

(C) Champions; (P) Promoted; (R) Relegated

=== Results ===
Home \ Away	BAR	BLP	BRA	BUR	CHF	CLA	DER	FUL	GAI	GLP	GRI	HUL	LEE	LEI	LIN	OLD	STP	STK	WBA	WOL
Barnsley		0–0	1–2	2–3	5–2	2–2	2–4	6–0	1–2	4–1	2–1	4–2	1–3	1–3	2–1	2–1	0–0	0–1	1–3	5–0
Blackpool	1–1		2–1	1–0	2–0	5–0	1–0	2–1	0–1	4–0	3–0	1–1	2–3	2–2	4–3	1–0	1–3	1–0	0–1	0–2
Bradford City	2–0	3–0		2–0	8–1	1–0	3–1	1–3	7–1	2–1	1–1	2–1	5–0	1–5	2–0	1–0	5–0	6–0	0–0	6–2
Burnley	4–1	2–1	2–1		1–1	3–0	2–2	0–1	2–0	1–0	5–1	5–0	1–0	4–1	1–2	2–1	4–0	3–1	1–1	1–0
Chesterfield	1–3	3–2	1–1	2–4		1–1	0–2	1–1	2–2	3–7	0–0	1–2	4–3	2–2	2–1	1–2	4–1	2–4	1–0	2–0
Clapton Orient	2–0	1–1	0–3	0–1	5–1		1–0	0–1	2–0	0–0	2–1	1–0	0–0	0–1	2–0	2–0	4–1	3–0	2–2	1–1
Derby County	3–0	2–1	2–3	1–0	0–0	4–0		0–1	5–2	2–0	4–0	4–1	6–1	1–2	4–0	1–0	3–0	3–0	2–0	3–2
Fulham	2–0	3–0	0–2	2–1	5–0	4–0	0–0		6–0	6–1	0–1	0–1	2–0	5–1	6–1	1–2	0–1	5–1	1–1	2–1
Gainsborough Trinity	0–1	2–1	1–5	2–0	2–1	0–0	1–4	3–3		1–0	3–2	1–2	2–1	1–1	5–1	1–1	3–2	2–0	1–2	0–1
Glossop	3–1	2–2	2–2	3–1	3–2	2–1	2–3	1–2	1–0		1–2	5–1	0–2	2–3	3–1	0–0	1–1	2–0	2–1	1–1
Grimsby Town	4–1	2–2	0–1	0–1	4–3	0–0	1–0	0–4	1–4	4–0		1–1	2–0	1–1	0–2	2–0	2–1	1–0	2–2	0–1
Hull City	2–0	3–2	0–2	3–1	2–0	5–0	4–0	1–2	0–1	3–2	4–2		4–1	3–2	5–3	3–2	0–0	2–1	4–2	2–0
Leeds City	1–1	1–1	0–1	2–2	0–0	5–2	5–1	0–1	0–0	2–1	4–1	3–2		0–0	2–1	1–2	3–0	0–1	1–0	3–1
Leicester Fosse	4–0	2–1	2–1	3–1	3–1	0–2	1–3	2–3	3–0	3–1	1–1	3–2	2–2		1–0	4–1	2–1	1–0	3–0	1–0
Lincoln City	0–2	2–0	2–4	1–3	4–0	2–2	1–0	2–4	2–0	0–1	1–0	0–1	5–0	0–3		0–2	1–1	1–2	0–2	3–1
Oldham Athletic	1–0	3–2	4–0	1–1	4–0	4–1	3–1	3–3	4–1	0–0	2–0	3–0	4–2	1–1	4–0		5–0	3–1	2–1	2–0
Stockport County	2–0	1–1	1–1	1–3	1–0	6–1	2–1	2–0	1–1	3–2	3–0	2–3	2–1	2–1	1–1	2–3		1–2	1–2	1–3
Stoke	4–0	3–1	3–0	0–0	1–1	3–0	0–3	6–1	5–0	4–0	5–0	1–1	2–1	0–1	3–0	1–3	1–0		1–1	0–0
West Bromwich Albion	1–1	3–0	3–2	5–0	4–0	3–0	1–0	3–1	0–1	1–1	1–2	1–0	1–0	1–1	5–2	1–2	2–0	1–0		1–0
Wolverhampton Wanderers	0–1	1–0	0–0	5–1	0–0	2–0	2–2	2–0	1–0	5–0	5–1	1–2	2–0	0–0	3–0	2–1	0–1	2–0	1–2	

Updated to match(es) played on unknown. Source: www.soccerbase.com
Legend: Blue = home team win; Yellow = draw; Red = away team win.

=== Maps ===
Locations of the Football League Second Division teams

== Attendances ==
#	Football club	Home games	Average attendance
1	Chelsea FC	19	31,965
2	Newcastle United	19	27,875
3	Manchester City	19	23,255
4	Manchester United	19	22,315
5	Aston Villa	19	19,520
6	Everton FC	19	17,630
7	Sunderland AFC	19	17,470
8	Liverpool FC	19	16,905
9	Middlesbrough FC	19	16,605
10	Birmingham City	19	15,265
11	Bolton Wanderers	19	14,515
12	Woolwich Arsenal	19	13,765
13	The Wednesday	19	13,500
14	Blackburn Rovers	19	13,270
15	Bristol City	19	13,245
16	Sheffield United	19	12,890
17	Nottingham Forest	19	12,840
18	Bury FC	19	11,880
19	Preston North End	19	10,870
20	Notts County	19	10,605

== See also ==
- 1907–08 in English football
