= Wilf Woodcock =

English footballer

Personal information
- Full name: Wilfred Woodcock
- Date of birth: 15 February 1892
- Place of birth: Droylsden, England
- Date of death: 1966 (aged 73–74)
- Place of death: Droylsden, England
- Height: 5 ft 8 in (1.73 m)
- Position: Inside right

Youth career
- Abbey Hey

Senior career*
Years	Team	Apps	(Gls)
1911–1912	Stalybridge Celtic		
1912–1920	Manchester United	58	(20)
1920–1922	Manchester City	15	(2)
1922–1924	Stockport County	75	(23)
1924–1925	Wigan Borough	14	(2)
1927–1929	Sandbach Ramblers		
- * Club domestic league appearances and goals

Wilf Woodcock (15 February 1892 – October 1966) was an English footballer. His regular position was as a forward. Born in Droylsden, he played for Abbey Hey, Stalybridge Celtic, Manchester United, Manchester City, Stockport County and Wigan Borough.
