= John Henry Davies =

English brewery owner (c. 1864–1927)

- Born: John Henry Davies c. 1864; Tutbury, Staffordshire, England
- Died: 24 October 1927 (aged 63); Llandudno, Conwy County Borough, Wales
- Occupations: Estate agent, innkeeper
- Known for: Chairman of Newton Heath LYR FC (now Manchester United)

John Henry Davies (c. 1864 – 24 October 1927) was a wealthy British brewery owner who in 1902 took over the football club Manchester United, which was then called Newton Heath. The club was struggling with a debt of £2,670 at the time.

Davies was born in Tutbury, Staffordshire, the fifth of nine children of David Davies, a Welsh engineer from Mold, Flintshire, and Susannah Nield Davies, from Bunbury, Cheshire. He grew up in Chorlton-on-Medlock, Manchester.

He did not come from a wealthy family and initially worked as an estate agent and innkeeper. He first moved into the brewing business in the late 1890s as a director of John Henry Lees brewery in Moss Side (formed in 1897). By the beginning of the next century, he was chairman of the Walker and Homfray Brewery, and in 1904 he also became chairman of the Manchester Brewery Company, which owned many public houses in Manchester and Salford. Walker and Homfray took control of the Manchester Brewery and several other companies in 1912. Davies also gained control of Stockport-based Daniel Clifton & Company, which owned around 50 pubs and off-licences. In 1920, he founded the Moss Side Brewery Company and the Palatine Bottling Company.

Before his involvement in football, he had become independently rich and had also married into another wealthy family. His wife Amy (née Caterall) was the niece and ward of sugar merchant Sir Henry Tate. Davies and his wife became known as philanthropists and were noted for their support of other sports in the Manchester area.

There is a popular story attached to how he came to take over Newton Heath. According to the story, the club captain Harry Stafford's dog (a St Bernard named Major) wandered away from the player at the club fund-raising bazaar at St James's Hall, Manchester in February 1901. Major was found by Davies, who returned him to Stafford. Davies asked if he could buy the dog, but instead ended up donating to the club. As a gesture of thanks, Stafford allowed him to keep the dog. In March 1902, at a meeting in the New Islington Hall, Stafford announced to Newton Heath supporters that he, Davies and three other local businessmen had agreed to invest £200 each in the club in order to save it after a winding-up order had been issued two months earlier.

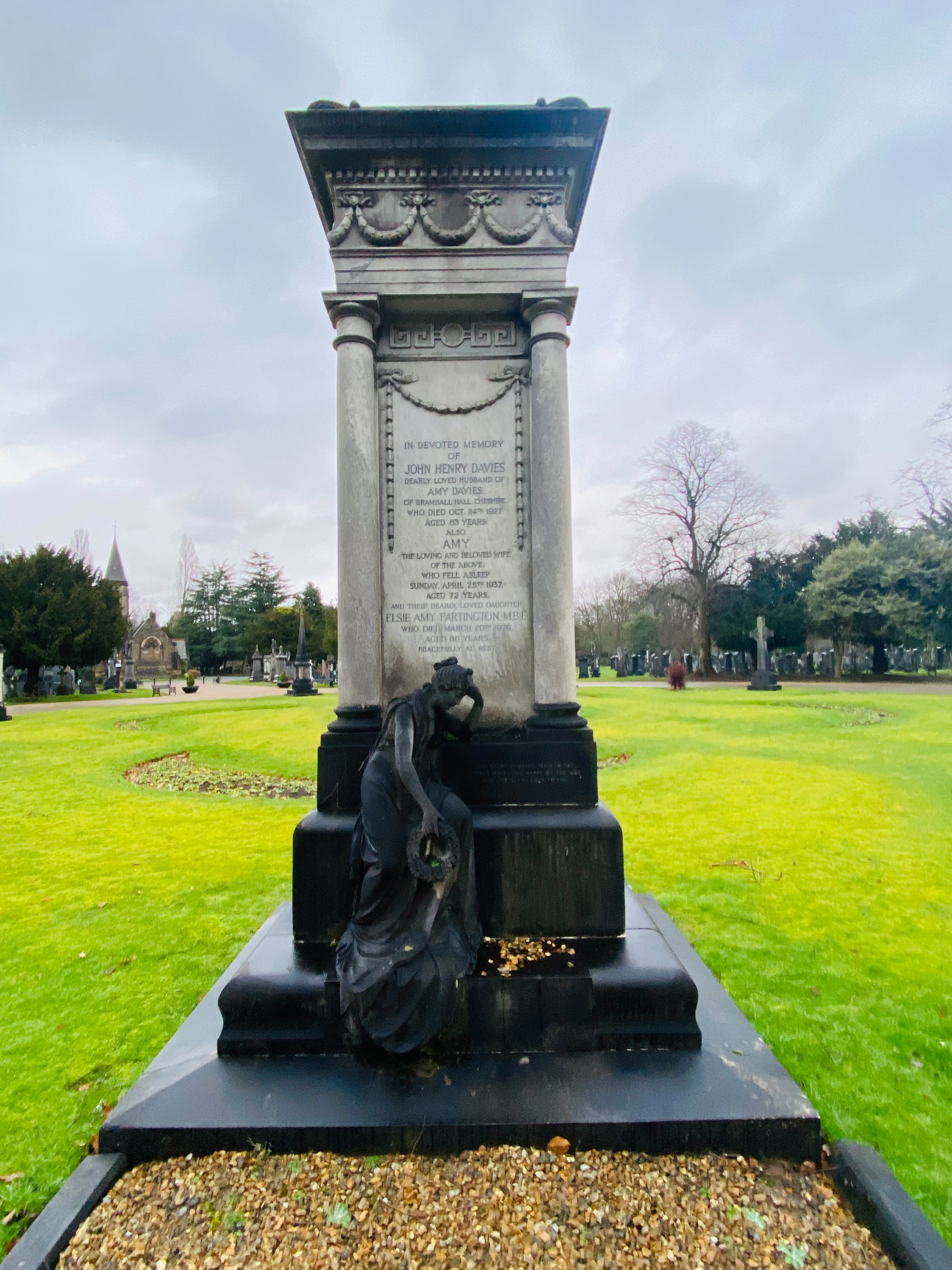
The grave of John Henry Davies in Southern Cemetery, Manchester

Under Davies's stewardship, the club changed its name to Manchester United FC and switched colours from white and navy to the now-famous red, white and black.

Their Bank Street ground was upgraded to accommodate more supporters, and Ernest Mangnall was appointed manager a year later. Players such as Alex Bell, Harry Moger, Charlie Roberts, George Wall and Charlie Sagar were signed, and the club began to move forward. and by 1906 United had been promoted to the First Division. They won the league in 1908 and the FA Cup in 1909 before Davies funded the move to a new ground at Old Trafford in 1910. A further league championship was won in 1911, but the ageing players, the loss of Mangnall to local rivals Manchester City and the outbreak of the First World War brought an end to the club's first period of success on the pitch.

Davies died Llandudno, Caernarfonshire, Wales, at the age of 63 after being in ill health for the previous three years. By this stage, United were back in the First Division after a spell in the Second Division.
