= 1907–08 Queens Park Rangers F.C. season =

English football club season

Queens Park Rangers
1907–08 season
- Chairman: Frank J. Walton
- Manager: James Cowan
- Stadium: New Park Royal
- Southern League Division One: Winners
- FA Cup: 2nd Round
- Western Football League Division One: 5th
- Charity Shield: Tie
- Top goalscorer: League: Alfred Gittens 16; All: Alfred Gittens, Arthur Walker 16
- Highest home attendance: 29,786 (25 December 1907) Vs Plymouth
- Lowest home attendance: 4,000 (7 September 1907) Vs New Brompton
- Biggest win: 4–0 (20 April 190) Vs West Ham
- Biggest defeat: 3–8 (29 April 1908) Vs Swindon
Home colours	Away colours

The 1907–08 Queens Park Rangers season was the club's 20th season of existence and their 9th season in the Southern League Division One, the top non-league division of football in England at the time. QPR also competed in the 1907–08 Western Football League.

== Season summary ==
In the 1907–08 season QPR continued play in the Southern League Division One and won their first Southern League title. as winners they were selected to play in the inaugural FA Charity Shield against Manchester United. Qpr began playing home games at the New Park Royal Ground – opening a new stand in November.

== Football League elections ==
Three Southern League clubs, Bradford Park Avenue, Queens Park Rangers and Tottenham Hotspur, applied for election to the Football League, although QPR later withdrew their application

=== Southern League Division One ===
Pos	Team	Pld	W	D	L	GF	GA	GR	Pts	
1	Queens Park Rangers	38	21	9	8	82	57	1.439	51	
2	Plymouth Argyle	38	19	11	8	50	31	1.613	49	
3	Millwall	38	19	8	11	49	32	1.531	46	
7	Tottenham Hotspur	38	17	7	14	59	48	1.229	41	Elected to the Football League Second Division
13	Bradford Park Avenue	38	12	12	14	53	54	0.981	36	Elected to the Football League Second Division

=== Results ===
QPR scores given first

Win Draw Loss

=== Southern League Division One ===
Date	Venue	Opponent	Result	Score F–A	Scorers	Attendance	League Position
2 September 1907	H	Tottenham	D	3–3	Gittins 2, Hitchcock	8,000	7
7 September 1907	H	New Brompton	D	2–2	Rogers, Hitchcock	4,000	8
14 September 1907	A	Tottenham	L	2–3	Walker, Barnes	12,000	13
21 September 1907	H	Swindon	W	2–1	Sugden 2 *	5,000	12
28 September 1907	A	Crystal P	W	3–2	Gittins 2, Walker	8,000	8
5 October 1907	H	Luton	W	3–1	Barnes, Gittins, Pentland	10,000	4
12 October 1907	A	Brighton	W	3–2	White, Walker, Gittins	8,000	2
19 October 1907	H	Portsmouth	W	3–2	Pentland, Skilton, Gittins	10,000	2
26 October 1907	A	Bradford	D	2–2	Skilton, Walker	15,000	2
2 November 1907	H	Millwall	L	2–3	Walker, Gittins	16,000	3
9 November 1907	A	Brentford	D	1–1	Downing	10,000	4
16 November 1907	H	Bristol R	W	5–3	Barnes, Pentland 2, Walker, Skilton	10,000	2
23 November 1907	A	Leyton	W	5–2	Walker 2, Gittins 2, Pentland (pen)	5,000	2
30 November 1907	H	Reading	W	1–0	Pentland (pen)	10,000	2
7 December 1907	A	Watford	W	3–0	Skilton, Walker, Gittins	6,000	1
14 December 1907	H	Norwich	W	3–1	Pentland 2, Downing	6,000	1
21 December 1907	A	Northampton	W	2–1	Pentland 2	6,000	1
25 December 1907	H	Plymouth	D	0–0		29,786	1
26 December 1907	A	West Ham	L	0–3		15,000	1
28 December 1907	H	Southampton	W	3–0	Walker 2, Sugden	7,000	1
4 January 1908	A	New Brompton	W	4–0	Downing, Barnes, Sugden, Gittins	6,000	1
18 January 1908	A	Swindon		0–0	abandoned after 75 mins due to fog	8,000	
25 January 1908	H	Crystal P	L	1–2	Ainsworth	6,000	1
8 February 1908	H	Brighton	W	1–0	Barnes	8,000	1
15 February 1908	A	Portsmouth	L	0–1		4,000	1
22 February 1908	H	Bradford	W	2–0	Barnes, Walker	7,000	1
26 February 1908	A	Luton	D	0–0		4,000	1
29 February 1908	A	Millwall	D	0–0		12,000	1
7 March 1908	H	Brentford	W	1–0	Cannon	10,000	1
14 March 1908	A	Bristol R	W	1–0	Downing	12,000	1
21 March 1908	H	Leyton	W	5–2	Lintott, Gittins, Pentland (pen), Skilton, Barnes	6,000	1
28 March 1908	A	Reading	W	3–0	Gittins 2, Cannon	5,000	1
4 April 1908	H	Watford	D	3–3	Barnes, Cannon, Pentland	8,000	1
11 April 1908	A	Norwich	W	1–0	Gittins	4,000	1
17 April 1908	A	Plymouth	D	1–1	Barnes	15,000	1
18 April 1908	H	Northampton	L	2–3	Pentland, Barnes	14,000	1
20 April 1908	H	West Ham	W	4–0	Cannon 3, Pentland	10,000	1
28 April 1908	A	Southampton	L	2–5	Walker, Snellgrove	2,000	1
29 April 1908	A	Swindon	L	3–8	Walker 2, Ainsworth	1,500	1

== Western Football League Division One ==
=== Section A ===
Pos	Team	Pld	W	D	L	GF	GA	GR	Pts
1	Southampton	12	8	1	3	30	12	2.500	17
2	Portsmouth	12	7	1	4	25	13	1.923	15
3	Brighton & Hove Albion	12	6	2	4	19	19	1.000	14
4	Plymouth Argyle	12	5	2	5	14	17	0.824	12
5	Queens Park Rangers	12	5	1	6	20	23	0.870	11

Date	Venue	Opponent	Result	Score F–A	Scorers	Attendance	League Position
11 September 1907	A	Portsmouth	W	4–3	Barnes, Pentland, Walker, Philip (og)	4,000	
16 September 1907	H	Brentford	W	3–1	Walker 3	4,000	1
25 September 1907	A	Brentford	D	1–1	Pentland (pen)	2,000	1
30 September 1907	H	Portsmouth	L	3–5	Gittins, Barnes, Sugden	2,000	1
7 October 1907	A	Leyton	W	1–0	Walker	1,000	1
14 October 1907	H	Plymouth	L	0–1		4,000	2
21 October 1907	A	Southampton	L	0–4		2,000	4
28 October 1907	H	Leyton	W	2–0	Walker, Downing	2,000	2
4 November 1907	H	Southampton	L	2–4	Sugden 2	3,000	2
11 November 1907	H	Brighton			abandoned after 20 mins due to fog		
20 November 1907	A	Plymouth	W	2–0	Walker, Barnes	5,000	3
4 December 1907	A	Brighton	L	0–1		1,000	4
30 December 1907	H	Brighton	L	2–3	Sugden, Ainsworth	1,000	5

=== FA Charity Shield ===
Date	Venue	Opponent	Result	Score F–A	Scorers	Attendance
27 April 1908	Stamford Bridge	Manchester U	D	1–1	Cannon 11'	12,000

=== Southern Professional Charity Cup ===
Round	Date	Venue	Opponent	Result	Score F–A	Scorers	Attendance
One	9 September 1907	A	Brighton	L	1–3	Rogers	2,000

=== FA Cup ===
Round	Date	Venue	Opponent	Result	Score F–A	Scorers	Attendance
Fifth qualifying round	Saturday 7 December 1907			Bye			
First Round	11 January 1908	H	Reading (Southern League)	W	1–0	Barnes	18,500
First Round Replay	1 February 1908	A	Swindon Town (Southern League)	L	1–2	Walker	9,771

== Squad ==
Position	Nationality	Name	Southern League Appearances	Southern League Goals	FA Cup Appearances	FA Cup Goals	Western League Appearances	Western League Goals
GK	(England)	Alfred Nicholls						
GK	(Scotland)	Charlie Shaw	38		2		11	
DF		Hugh Lawrie	2				1	
DF	(England)	Joe Fidler	33		1		9	
DF	(Scotland)	John Macdonald	15		1		6	
DF	(Scotland)	James McDonald						
DF	(Scotland)	Jim Gillespie						
DF	(Scotland)	John McLean	28		1		9	
DF	(England)	Jack White	25	1	2		7	
DF	(England)	Watty Corbett						
MF	(England)	Evelyn Lintott	22	1	2			
MF	(England)	Archie Mitchell	12	11				
MF	(England)	Sam Morris	2				5	
MF	(Scotland)	Harry Duff						
MF	(England)	George Berry					1	
MF	(England)	Sam Downing	30	4	2		4	1
MF	(England)	Eddie Anderson	1				3	
MF		S. Ford					1	
FW	(England)	Billy Barnes	36	10	2	1	11	3
FW	(England)	Alf Gittins	36	16	2		9	1
FW	(England)	Albert Rogers	5	1			12	
FW	(England)	Percy Skilton	21	5				
FW	(England)	George Snellgrove	3	1				
FW	(Scotland)	Tommy McKenzie						
FW	(England)	Frank Cannon	9	6				
FW	(England)	Billy Law						
FW	(England)	Ernie Hitchcock	2	2			3	
FW	(England)	Albert Walker	28	15	2	1	9	7
FW	(England)	Billy Yenson	21		1		4	
FW	(England)	Sidney Sugden	9	4	2		6	4
FW	(England)	Fred Pentland	37	14	2		10	2
FW	(England)	Charlie Ainsworth	2	2			1	1

== Transfers in ==
Name	from	Date	Fee
Ansell, W		cs1907	
Alfred Nicholls	Aston Villa	23 July 1907	
Evelyn Lintott	Plymouth	Aug1907	
Walter Corbett	Birmingham	Aug1907	Loan
Skilton, Arthur *	Harrow U	Aug1907	
Theobald, J		Aug1907	
Stagg, J		Aug1907	
Charlie Ainsworth	Aston Villa	Aug1907	
John Macdonald	Grimsby	9 Sep 1907	
George Berry		Sep1907	
Perry, E *		Sep1907	
Ford, S *	Middlesbrough	14 Dec 1907	
Cannon, Frank	Hitchin Town	Feb1908	
Williams, Ernest	Clapton Orient	17 Feb 1908	
Tommy McKenzie	Glossop	2 May 1908	
Billy Law	Watford	4 May 1908	
James McDonald	Aberdeen	8 May 1908	
George Snellgrove	Sittingbourne	10 Mar 1908	
Harry Duff	Manchester C	12 May 1908	
Jim Gillespie	Third Lanark	12 May 1908	

== Transfers out ==
Name	from	Date	Fee	Date	To	Fee
Wallace, Bertram	Stoke Town	10 Oct 1906		cs 1907		
Roberts, George *	Harrow U	7 June 1906		cs 1907		
Howes, Arthur	Brighton	4 Nov 1904		cs 1907	Retired (Injury)	
Moger, Thomas	Freemantle	May1905		cs 1907	Barrow	
Fox, Seeley *	Ealing	Apr1904		cs 1907	Ealing	
Taylor, Jack *	Croydon	Aug1905		cs 1907		
Murphy, Fred		Sep1906		cs 1907	Maidstone U	
Fletcher, Jack	West Ham	3 May 1905		Aug 1907	Wingate Albion	
Thompson, Andy	Sunderland	4 May 1905		Aug 1907	Wingate Albion	
Walter Corbett	Birmingham	Aug1907		Sep 1907	Birmingham	Loan
Coates, George	Newcastle East End	Aug1905		Sep 1907	Ashington	
Ansell, W		cs1907		Sep 1907		
Blake, Sid	Newcastle	1 May 1906		Sep 1907	Whitley Athletic	
Edwards, Albert	Manchester C	6 July 1901		Oct 1907	Wingate Albion	
McGargill, Henry	Gateshead Town	10 Aug 1905		Oct 1907	Scotswood	
Theobald, J		Aug1907		Oct 1907		
Hendren, Elias (Patsy)	Sanderson's	cs1906		Nov 1907	Brentford	
Williams, Ernest	Clapton Orient	17 Feb 1908		Mar 1908	Rhyl	
Webb, Isaac (Ike)	Sunderland			May 1908	Retired	
Jack White	Grays U	28 May 1901		May 1908	Leeds City	
Bill Yenson	Bolton	3 May 1905		May 1908	West Ham	
Albert Walker	Nottingham	25 May 1907		May 1908	Notts County	
Fred Pentland	Brentford	3 May 1907		June 1908	Middlesbrough	£350
Hugh Lawrie	Bolton	2 May 1907		cs 1908		
Eddie Anderson	Sheffield U	2 May 1906		cs 1908		
Skilton, Arthur *	Harrow U	Aug1907		cs 1908	Ilford	
Stagg, J		Aug1907		cs 1908		
Perry, E *		Sep1907		cs 1908		
Ford, S *		14 Dec 1907		cs 1908		
