= 1908–09 Queens Park Rangers F.C. season =

English football club season

Queens Park Rangers
1908–09 season
- Chairman: Frank J. Walton
- Manager: James Cowan
- Stadium: New Park Royal
- Southern League Division One: 15th
- FA Cup: 1st Round
- Western Football League Division One: 2nd
- Charity Shield: Runner-up
- Top goalscorer: League: Billy Barnes 11; All: Billy Barnes 11
- Highest home attendance: 20,000 (25 December 1908) Vs Norwich
- Lowest home attendance: 2,000 (26 October 1908) Vs New Brompton , (23 November 1908) Vs Leyton, (15 March 1909) vs Luton
- Biggest win: 5–1 (27 March 1909) vs Swindon
- Biggest defeat: 0–3 (21 October 1908) vs Crystal Palace, (23 November 1908) vs Leyton
Home colours	Away colours

The 1908–09 Queens Park Rangers season was the club's 21st season of existence and their 10th season in the Southern League Division One, the top non-league division of football in England at the time. QPR also competed in the 1908–09 Western Football League resigning at the end of the season.

== Season summary ==
In the 1908–09 season QPR continued play in the Southern League Division One and finished 15th. The first game of the season was the replay of the inaugural FA Charity Shield from the 1–1 draw in April of the previous season.

=== Southern League Division One ===
Pos	Team	Pld	W	D	L	GF	GA	GR	Pts
15	Queens Park Rangers	40	12	12	16	52	50	1.040	36
16	Crystal Palace	40	12	12	16	62	62	1.000	36
17	West Ham United	40	16	4	20	56	60	0.933	36
18	Brighton & Hove Albion	40	14	7	19	60	61	0.984	35
19	Norwich City	40	12	11	17	59	75	0.787	35
20	Coventry City	40	15	4	21	64	91	0.703	34
21	Brentford	40	13	7	20	59	74	0.797	33

=== Results ===
QPR scores given first

Win Draw Loss

=== Southern League Division One ===
Date	Venue	Opponent	Result	Score F–A	Scorers	Attendance	League Position
1 September 1908	A	West Ham	L	0–2		7,000	17
7 September 1908	H	Watford	W	2–0	McKenzie, Barnes	4,000	12
10 September 1908	A	Northampton	D	0–0		6,000	8
14 September 1908	H	Portsmouth	D	0–0		5,000	8
16 September 1908	A	Watford	D	0–0		3,000	6
19 September 1908	H	Plymouth	W	1–0	Cannon	10,000	4
23 September 1908	A	Reading	L	0–2		4,000	5
28 September 1908	A	Brentford	D	0–0		5,000	3
3 October 1908	A	Portsmouth	L	1–3	Barnes	10,000	7
12 October 1908	H	Coventry	W	4–2	Downing 2, Barnes, Gittins	7,000	6
17 October 1908	H	West Ham	W	3–0	Skilton 2, Rogers	6,000	5
21 October 1908	A	Crystal P	L	0–3		5,000	5
26 October 1908	H	New Brompton	W	2–1	Rogers, Cannon	2,000	3
2 November 1908	H	Southend	W	2–1	Drake, Barnes	5,000	3
7 November 1908	H	Brentford	W	3–0	Drake 2, Barnes	10,000	3
11 November 1908	A	Brighton	D	1–1	Barnes	5,000	3
21 November 1908	A	Swindon	L	1–3	Barnes	5,000	4
23 November 1908	H	Leyton	L	0–3		2,000	4
5 December 1908	H	Millwall	D	2–2	Rogers 2	7,000	4
25 December 1908	H	Norwich	D	2–2	Drake, Barnes	20,000	7
26 December 1908	A	Southampton	W	4–1	Law, Skilton, Downing, Rogers	14,000	6
28 December 1908	A	Millwall	W	1–0	Greer	5,000	4
25 January 1909	H	Bristol R	W	4–2	Morris, Rogers, Drake, Greer	5,000	6
6 February 1909	A	Coventry	L	1–2	Drake	5,671	6
8 February 1909	A	Luton	L	0–1		5,000	8
20 February 1909	H	Exeter	D	1–1	Skilton	7,000	9
24 February 1909	A	Exeter	L	0–1		4,000	9
10 March 1909	A	New Brompton	L	0–1		3,000	11
15 March 1909	H	Luton	W	4–0	Downing (pen), Morris, Barnes 2	2,000	9
22 March 1909	H	Brighton	L	1–2	Downing (pen)	3,000	11
27 March 1909	H	Swindon	W	5–1	Skilton 3, Rogers, Greer	8,000	9
29 March 1909	A	Bristol R	D	0–0		2,000	9
3 April 1909	H	Crystal P	D	1–1	Greer	6,000	8
9 April 1909	H	Southampton	L	1–2	Greer	12,000	9
10 April 1909	A	Plymouth	L	0–2		7,000	11
12 April 1909	A	Norwich	L	2–3	Greer, Rogers	10,000	13
13 April 1909	H	Reading	L	2–3	Cannon, Barnes	2,000	14
19 April 1909	H	Northampton	D	1–1	Skilton	3,000	15
26 April 1909	A	Leyton	L	0–1		4,000	17
28 April 1909	A	Southend	D	0–0		2,000	15

== Western Football League Division One ==
=== Section A ===
Pos	Team	Pld	W	D	L	GF	GA	GR	Pts	Result
1	Brighton & Hove Albion	12	7	2	3	23	13	1.769	16	All clubs left at the end of the season
2	Queens Park Rangers	12	6	1	5	28	24	1.167	13	All clubs left at the end of the season
3	Crystal Palace	12	5	2	5	23	22	1.045	12	All clubs left at the end of the season
4	Luton Town	12	5	2	5	24	24	1.000	12	All clubs left at the end of the season
5	Croydon Common	12	5	2	5	16	24	0.667	12	All clubs left at the end of the season
6	Reading	12	4	2	6	19	21	0.905	10	All clubs left at the end of the season
7	Leyton	12	4	1	7	16	21	0.762	9	All clubs left at the end of the season

Date	Venue	Opponent	Result	Score F–A	Scorers	Attendance	League Position
5 September 1908	H	Croydon Common	W	2–0	Gittins, Downing	4,000	
12 September 1908	A	Croydon Common	L	1–3	Cannon	4,000	
30 September 1908	A	Luton	L	1–8	Drake	1,000	7
19 October 1908	A	Leyton	L	1–2	McKenzie	600	7
30 November 1908	H	Reading	W	6–1	Crump (og), Drake 2, Wilkes (og), Cannon 2	2,000	7
7 December 1908	H	Brighton	L	0–1		1,000	7
14 December 1908	H	Luton	Abandoned	1–1	Greer	1,000	
16 December 1908	A	Crystal P	D	2–2	Greer, Downing	2,000	7
4 January 1909	H	Crystal P	W	5–1	Greer 2, Rogers 2, Drake (pen)	500	5
27 January 1909	A	Reading	L	1–2	Drake	handful	7
1 February 1909	H	Leyton	W	3–1	Barnes, Rogers, McDonald	1,000	
21 February 1909	H	Luton	W	2–0	McNaught, Mitchell	500	
3 March 1909	A	Brighton	W	4–3	Snellgrove 2, McDonald, Rogers	1,000	2

=== London Challenge Cup ===
Round	Date	Venue	Opponent	Result	Score F–A	Scorers	Attendance
LCC 1	5 October 1908	A	Tottenham	L	0–1		5,000

=== FA Charity Shield ===
Date	Venue	Opponent	Result	Score F–A	Scorers	Attendance
29 August 1908	Stamford Bridge	Manchester U	L	0–4		40,000

=== London Professional Charity Fund ===
Date	Venue	Opponent	Result	Score F–A	Scorers	Attendance
1 March 1909	A	Fulham	L	1–2	Rogers	300

=== Southern Professional Charity Cup ===
Round	Date	Venue	Opponent	Result	Score F–A	Scorers	Attendance
SCC 1	17 April 1909	A	Brentford	L	1–2	Snellgrove	2,000

=== FA Cup ===
Round	Date	Venue	Opponent	Result	Score F–A	Scorers	Attendance
Fifth qualifying round	Saturday 5 December 1908			Bye			
First Round	16 January 1909	H	West Ham United (Southern League)	D	0–0		9,295
First Round Replay	20 January 1909	A	West Ham United (Southern League)	L	0–1		23,574

== Squad ==
Position	Nationality	Name	Southern League Appearances	Southern League Goals	FA Cup Appearances	FA Cup Goals	Western League Appearances	Western League Goals
GK	(England)	Alfred Nicholls					1	
GK	(Scotland)	Charlie Shaw	40		2		12	
DF	(England)	Joe Fidler	37		2		11	
DF	(Scotland)	John Macdonald	39		2		6	
DF		Reid					1	
DF	(Scotland)	Willie Logan						
DF	(England)	Frank Wentworth						
DF	(Scotland)	James McDonald	18		2		8	2
DF	(Scotland)	Jim Gillespie	1				6	
DF	(Scotland)	John McLean	12				3	
DF	(Scotland)	Bob McEwan	3				4	
MF	(England)	Evelyn Lintott	9				2	
MF	(England)	Archie Mitchell	23		1		3	1
MF	(England)	Alf Whyman						
MF	(England)	Bill Wake						
MF	(England)	Sam Morris	23	2	1		7	
MF	(England)	Ambrose Hartwell						
MF	(England)	Joe Radnage						
MF	(England)	Robert King	3				1	
MF	(Scotland)	Harry Duff	21		2		9	
MF	(England)	George Berry					1	
MF	(England)	Sam Downing	31	5	2		11	2
FW	(England)	Billy Barnes	39	11	2		11	1
FW	(England)	Arthur Smith						
FW	(Scotland)	John McNaught	14				5	1
FW	(Republic of Ireland)	Bill Greer	16	6			6	3
FW	(England)	George Travers						
FW	(England)	Herbert Swann						
FW	(England)	Alf Gittins	5	1			1	1
FW	(England)	Albert Rogers	29	8			6	4
FW	(England)	Percy Skilton	19	8			2	
FW	(England)	George Snellgrove	6				2	2
FW	(Scotland)	Tommy McKenzie	9	1			4	1
FW	(England)	Frank Cannon	19	3			6	3
FW	(England)	Alonzo Drake	20	6			10	5
FW	(England)	Billy Law	4	1	1		4	

== Transfers in ==
Name	from	Date	Fee
Drake, Alonzo	Birmingham	25 July 1908	
Bob McEwan	Glossop	28 July 1908	
Alonzo Drake	Birmingham	25 July 1908	
Smith, A G *		Aug1908	
John McNaught	Hounslow	29 Aug 1908	
Turner, H	St. Augustine's	4 Sep 1908	
Bean, F *		Oct1908	
Nugent, S	Clapton	Oct1908	
Robert King	Chertsey Town	31 Oct 1908	
Bill Greer	Dumbarton	14 Dec 1908	£75
Jolliffe		Jan1909	
Bowman, John	Shepherd's Bush	Jan 1909	
Reid *	trialist	30 Jan 1909	
Johnson, C		Feb1909	
Bowman, John	Shepherd's Bush	Jan 1909	
Clark, J *		Apr1909	
Myerscough, J *		Apr1909	
Ashman, Harry *		Apr1909	
Riddy, Percy *		Apr 1909	
Kemp, Sydney *		Apr 1909	
Bill Wake	Exeter	1 May 1909	
Alf Whyman	New Brompton	4 May 1909	
George Travers	Aston Villa	4 May 1909	
Herbert Swann	Crystal P	4 May 1909	
Goodfellow, William	Salisbury City	6 May 1909	
Frank Wentworth	Salisbury City	6 May 1909	
Willie Logan	Vale of Leven	17 May 1909	
Ambrose Hartwell	Bradford Park Avenue	21 May 1909	
Ward, S *		cs1909	
Gibson, H A	Wood Green Town	cs1909	
Bullock, Fred *	Ilford	cs1909	
Leat, Edwin *		cs1909	
Joe Radnage	Shepherd's Bush	cs1909	
Ward, S *		cs1909	

== Transfers out ==
Name	from	Date	Fee	Date	To	Fee
Lawrie, Hugh	Bolton	2 May 1907		cs 1908		
Anderson, Eddie	Sheffield U	2 May 1906		cs 1908		
Skilton, Arthur *	Harrow U	Aug1907		cs 1908	Ilford	
Stagg, J		Aug1907		cs 1908		
Perry, E *		Sep1907		cs 1908		
Ford, S *		14 Dec 1907		cs 1908		
Sugden, Sydney	Nottingham	27 July 1905		Jul 1908	Brentford	
Ainsworth, Charlie	Aston Villa	Aug1907		Aug 1908	Derby	
Alf Gittins	Luton	3 May 1907		Oct 1908	Aston Villa	
Hitchcock, Ernie	Aston Villa	3 May 1907		Oct 1908	Bolsover Town	
Evelyn Lintott	Plymouth	Aug1907		Nov 1908	Bradford City	£1,000
Nugent, S	Clapton	Oct1908		Nov 1908		
Reid *	trialist	30 Jan 1909		Feb 1909		
Sam Downing	West Hampstead	Apr1903		Apr 1909	Chelsea	
John McLean	Millwall	May1906		May 1909	Retired	
Bob McEwan	Glossop	28 July 1908		May 1909	Dundee	
Jolliffe		Jan1909		May 1909		
Albert Rogers	Aston Villa	3 May 1907		May 1909	Aston Villa	
Harry Duff	Manchester C	12 May 1908		May 1909	Motherwell	
Bowman, John	Shepherd's Bush	Jan 1909		May 1909		
Frank Cannon	Hitchin Town	Feb1908		May 1909	West Ham	
Billy Law	Watford	4 May 1908		May 1909	Glossop	
Turner, H	St. Augustine's	4 Sep 1908		May 1909		
George Berry		Sep1907		cs 1909		
George Snellgrove	Sittingbourne	10 Mar 1908		cs 1909		
Percy Skilton	Harrow	Apr1904		cs 1909	Enfield	
Johnson, C		Feb1909		cs 1909		
