= 1911–12 Queens Park Rangers F.C. season =

English football club season

Queens Park Rangers
1911–12 season
- Chairman: J. H. Fielding
- Manager: James Cowan
- Stadium: New Park Royal
- Southern League Division One: Winners
- FA Cup: First Round
- London Challenge Cup: First Round
- FA Charity Shield: Runner up
- Top goalscorer: League: Dan McKie 15; All: Dan McKie 15
- Highest home attendance: 27,000 (5 April 1912) vs Southampton
- Lowest home attendance: 5,000 (3 February 1912) vs Exeter, (23 March 1912) vs Northampton
- Biggest win: 4–0 (7 October 1911) vs Brentford
- Biggest defeat: 1–5 (18 November 1911) vs Northampton
Home colours	Away colours

The 1911–12 Queens Park Rangers season was the club's 24th season of existence and their 13th season in the Southern League Division One, the top non-league division of football in England at the time.

== Season summary ==
In the 1911–12 season QPR continued play in the Southern League Division One and finished First winning their second league championship (the first being in 1907–08), but did not apply to join the Football League.At seasons end Qpr Competed in the 1912 Football Association Charity Shield was on 4 May 1912. The game was played at White Hart Lane, home of Tottenham Hotspur, and was contested by the Football League champions Blackburn Rovers and the winners of the Southern League championship, Queens Park Rangers. The game ended in a 2–1 win for Blackburn Rovers, and the proceeds of the match were donated to the Titanic Relief Fund.

=== Southern League Division One ===
Pos	Team	Pld	W	D	L	GF	GA	GR	Pts
1	Queens Park Rangers	38	21	11	6	59	35	1.686	53
2	Plymouth Argyle	38	23	6	9	63	31	2.032	52
3	Northampton Town	38	22	7	9	82	41	2.000	51
4	Swindon Town	38	21	6	11	82	50	1.640	48
5	Brighton & Hove Albion	38	19	9	10	73	35	2.086	47

=== Results ===
QPR scores given first

Win Draw Loss

=== Southern League Division One ===
Date	Venue	Opponent	Result	Score F–A	Scorers	Attendance	League Position
2 September 1911	A	Plymouth	W	1–0	Revill	10,000	3
9 September 1911	H	Reading	W	3–0	Butterworth, McKie,Thornton	10,000	2
16 September 1911	A	Watford	W	3–0	McKie, Thornton, Revill	3,000	1
23 September 1911	H	New Brompton	W	3–0	Revill 2, McKie	12,000	1
30 September 1911	A	Exeter	D	1–1	McKie (pen)	4,000	1
7 October 1911	H	Brentford	W	4–0	McKie 2 (1 pen), Revill, Browning	15,000	1
14 October 1911	H	Luton	W	2–0	Revill, McKie	14,000	1
21 October 1911	A	Millwall	D	1–1	Barnes	25,000	1
28 October 1911	H	West Ham	W	4–1	Thornton 2, Revill, McKie	25,000	1
4 November 1911	A	Bristol R	W	2–0	McKie, Revill	16,000	1
11 November 1911	H	Swindon	L	1–3	McKie	25,000	1
18 November 1911	A	Northampton	L	1–5	McKie	6,000	2
25 November 1911	H	Brighton	W	2–0	Mitchell (pen), Thornton	8,000	2
2 December 1911	A	Stoke	W	2–0	Barnes, McKie	15,000	2
9 December 1911	H	Coventry	D	0–0		6,000	2
16 December 1911	A	Leyton	W	1–0	Thornton	4,000	2
23 December 1911	H	Norwich	L	1–2	Revill	8,000	2
25 December 1911	H	Crystal P	W	3–2	Thornton 2, Revill	22,000	2
26 December 1911	A	Crystal P	L	0–3		8,000	2
30 December 1911	H	Plymouth	W	2–0	Revill, Mitchell (pen)	9,000	2
6 January 1912	A	Reading	W	1–0	Ovens	4,000	2
20 January 1912	H	Watford	D	1–1	Browning	10,000	2
27 January 1912	A	New Brompton	W	2–1	Barnes, Thornton	6,000	2
3 February 1912	H	Exeter	D	0–0		5,000	2
10 February 1912	A	Brentford	W	2–1	Revill, Barnes	8,000	2
17 February 1912	A	Luton	W	3–1	McKie, Smith 2	6,000	2
24 February 1912	H	Millwall	D	1–1	Mitchell (pen)	13,000	2
2 March 1912	A	West Ham	L	0–3		10,000	2
9 March 1912	H	Bristol R	W	4–2	Thornton 2, Revill, McKie	6,000	1
16 March 1912	A	Swindon	D	1–1	Smith	8,000	1
23 March 1912	H	Northampton	W	2–1	Smith, McKie	5,000	1
30 March 1912	A	Brighton	L	1–3	Revill	7,000	1
5 April 1912	H	Southampton	D	1–1	Tosswill	27,000	1
6 April 1912	H	Stoke	W	1–0	Whyman	20,000	1
8 April 1912	A	Southampton	D	0–0		12,000	1
13 April 1912	A	Coventry	D	0–0		8,000	1
20 April 1912	H	Leyton	W	1–0	Thornton	8,000	1
27 April 1912	A	Norwich	D	1–1	Smith	6,000	1

=== London Challenge Cup ===
Round	Date	Venue	Opponent	Result	Score F–A	Scorers	Attendance
LCC 1	18 September 1911	H	Woolwich Arsenal	L	0-2		3,500

=== Southern Professional Charity Cup ===
Round	Date	Venue	Opponent	Result	Score F–A	Scorers	Attendance
SCC 1	11 October 1911	H	Crystal P	W	3–0	Revill, McKie, Browning	3,000
SCC 2	22 November 1911	A	Southend	L	4–5	King 2, Browning, Wilson	

=== London Professional Charity Fund ===
Date	Venue	Opponent	Result	Score F–A	Scorers	Attendance
30 October 1911	H	Clapton Orient	L	0–1		3,000

=== FA Charity Shield ===
Date	Venue	Opponent	Result	Score F–A	Scorers	Attendance
4 May 1912	White Hart Lane	Blackburn	L	1–2	Revill	7,111

=== Ealing Hospital Cup (Final) ===
Date	Venue	Opponent	Result	Score F–A	Scorers	Attendance
8 November 1911	H	Brentford	W	4–1	Revill 3, McKie	

=== FA Cup ===
Round	Date	Venue	Opponent	Result	Score F–A	Scorers	Attendance
Fifth round qualifying	Saturday 2 December 1911			Bye			
First Round	13 January 1912	H	Bradford City (First Division)		0–0		18,000
First Round (replay)	8 January 1912	A	Bradford City (First Division)		0–4		6,967

== Squad ==
Position	Nationality	Name	Southern League Appearances	Southern League Goals	FA Cup Appearances	FA Cup Goals
GK	(England)	F.W Matthews				
GK	(England)	Alfred Nicholls	1			
GK	(Scotland)	Charlie Shaw	37		2	
DF	(England)	Harry Pullen	29		2	
DF	(England)	Gilbert Ovens	25	1	2	
DF	(England)	Francis Weblin				
DF	(England)	Joe Fidler	6			
DF	(Scotland)	John Macdonald	32		2	
DF	(England)	Herbert Butterworth	15	1		
MF	(England)	Archie Mitchell	37	3	2	
MF	(England)	Alf Whyman	11	1	1	
MF	(England)	Bill Wake	38		2	
FW	(England)	Jimmy Birch				
FW	(England)	William Gaul				
FW	(England)	Teddy Revill	36	14	2	
FW	(England)	Billy Barnes	38	4	2	
FW	(England)	Bob Browning	8	2	2	
FW	(England)	Dan McKie	30	15		
FW	(England)	Vincent Jackman				
FW	(England)	James Sangster				
FW	(England)	Harry Thornton	34	12	1	
FW	(England)	Arthur Smith	35	5	1	
FW	(England)	Alex King	3		1	
FW	(England)	John Tosswill	3	1		

== Transfers in ==
Name	from	Date	Fee
Syms, W *	Southall	cs1911	
Matthews, F W *	Harlesden	cs1911	
Gorman, William *	Wycombe Wanderers	July1911	
Thornton, Harry *	Shepherd's Bush	July1911	
Adams, Frank *		July1911	
William Gaul	Shepherd's Bush	July1911	
Arthur Smith	Brierley Hill Alliance	July1911	
Gilbert Ovens	Chelsea	17 July 1911	Free
Alex King	Southend	18 July 1911	
Lawrence, Sidney *		Aug1911	
Baker, Billy *	Northfleet U	Aug1911	
Teddy Revill	Chesterfield	2 Aug 1911	
Rayner, Edward		1 Sep 1911	
Mooney, C		9 Sep 1911	
Marchant, George *	Tufnell Park	Mar1912	
John Tosswill	Maidstone U	23 Mar 1912	
James Sangster	Southall	1 May 1912	
Jimmy Birch	Aston Villa	2 May 1912	£150
Francis Weblin	West Norwood	cs1912	
Burke, William	Croydon Common	cs1912	

== Transfers out ==
Name	from	Date	Fee	Date	To	Fee
Brown, Billy *	Civil Service	May1910		July 1911	Chelsea	
Steer, Billy *	Kingston-on-Thames	17 Aug 1909		July 1911	Chelsea	
Davis, A		cs1910		cs 1911		
Ward, S *		cs1909		cs 1911	Tufnell Park	
Noble, Robert *	Bromley	Nov1910		cs 1911	Bromley	
Sentance, Martin		Aug1910		cs 1911	Nunhead	
Leigh, Thomas (Ginger)	Fulham	17 May 1910		Aug 1911	Croydon Common	
McNaught, John *	Hounslow	29 Aug 1908		Aug 1911	Southend	£25
Dilley, Reginald *	Bromley	Dec 1910		Sep 1911	Bromley	
Law, Robert *	Falkirk	Apr1911		Dec 1911		
Smith, A G *		Aug1908		Nov 1911	Kilburn	
Adams, Frank *		July1911		Jan 1912	Wycombe	
Rayner, Edward		1 Sep 1911		Feb 1912		
Mooney, C		9 Sep 1911		Mar 1912	West Ham	
Burton, Frank (Bronco)	Kilburn	cs1910		Apr 1912	West Ham	
Smith, Arthur *	Brierley Hill Alliance	July1911		June 1912	Birmingham	
John Tosswill	Maidstone U	23 Mar 1912		June 1912	Liverpool	£350
Matthews, F W *	Harlesden	cs1911		cs 1912	Hampstead Town	
Syms, W *	Southall	cs1911		cs 1912	Southall	
Lawrence, Sidney *		Aug1911		cs 1912		
Robinson, Jimmy *	Stourbridge	12 May 1911		cs 1912		
Gorman, William *	Wycombe Wanderers	July1911		cs 1912	Wycombe	
Baker, Billy *	Northfleet U	Aug1911		cs 1912	Dartford	
