= 1912–13 Queens Park Rangers F.C. season =

English football club season

Queens Park Rangers F.C.
1912–13 season
- Chairman: J. H. Fielding
- Manager: James Cowan
- Stadium: New Park Royal
- Southern League Division One: 4th
- FA Cup: 2nd Round
- London Challenge Cup: 2nd Round
- Southern Professional Charity Cup: Winners
- Top goalscorer: League: Jimmy Birch 16; All: Jimmy Birch 19
- Highest home attendance: 20,000 (25 December 1912) Vs Southampton
- Lowest home attendance: 4,000 (10 April 1913) Vs Bristol R
- Biggest win: 4–0 (5 April 1913) Vs Coventry
- Biggest defeat: 1–4 (1 March 1913) Vs Swindon,( 29 March 1913) Vs Brighton
Home colours	Away colours

The 1912–13 Queens Park Rangers season was the club's 25th season of existence and their 14th season in the Southern League Division One, the top non-league division of football in England at the time.

== Season summary ==
In the 1912–13 season QPR continued play in the Southern League Division One and finished 4th. The team also won the Southern Professional Charity Cup.

=== Southern League Division One ===
Pos	Team	Pld	W	D	L	GF	GA	GR	Pts
1	Plymouth Argyle	38	22	6	10	77	36	2.139	50
2	Swindon Town	38	20	8	10	66	41	1.610	48
3	West Ham United	38	18	12	8	66	46	1.435	48
4	Queens Park Rangers	38	18	10	10	46	35	1.314	46
5	Crystal Palace	38	17	11	10	55	36	1.528	45
6	Millwall	38	19	7	12	62	43	1.442	45

=== Results ===
QPR scores given first

Win Draw Loss

=== Southern League Division One ===
Date	Venue	Opponent	Result	Score F–A	Scorers	Attendance	League Position
5 September 1912	H	Plymouth	W	2–1	Birch, McKie	10,000	6
7 September 1912	H	Norwich	W	1–0	Birch	9,000	2
14 September 1912	A	Gillingham	D	0–0		7,000	2
21 September 1912	H	Northampton	W	3–2	Birch, Anderson, Browning	12,000	3
28 September 1912	A	Stoke	D	0–0		6,000	3
5 October 1912	A	Brentford	W	2–0	Birch, Revill	13,200	1
12 October 1912	H	Millwall	D	1–1	Revill	16,000	2
19 October 1912	A	Bristol R	L	0–3		5,000	6
26 October 1912	H	Swindon	W	2–0	Kay (og), Ovens	8,000	5
2 November 1912	A	Portsmouth	D	1–1	Birch	12,000	4
9 November 1912	H	Exeter	W	2–1	Revill, Mitchell	8,000	3
16 November 1912	A	West Ham	L	0–1		10,000	4
23 November 1912	H	Brighton	D	0–0		11,000	4
30 November 1912	A	Coventry	D	1–1	Thompson	5,000	4
7 December 1912	H	Watford	W	2–0	Birch 2	8,000	4
14 December 1912	A	Merthyr Town	D	0–0		3,000	4
21 December 1912	H	Crystal P	W	2–0	Revill 2	10,000	3
25 December 1912	H	Southampton	W	1–0	Birch	20,000	2
26 December 1912	A	Southampton	W	1–0	McKie	7,000	2
28 December 1912	A	Norwich	L	0–2		6,000	2
4 January 1913	H	Gillingham	W	2–0	Birch, Barnes	7,000	2
25 January 1913	H	Stoke	W	1–0	Whyman	9,000	1
8 February 1913	H	Brentford	W	2–1	Birch, Richards (og)	16,000	1
15 February 1913	A	Millwall	L	1–2	Gaul	14,000	2
22 February 1913	A	Northampton	D	0–0		6,000	1
1 March 1913	A	Swindon	L	1–4	McKie	6,000	2
8 March 1913	H	Portsmouth	D	1–1	Birch	8,000	3
15 March 1913	A	Exeter	L	1–3	Birch (pen)	6,000	5
21 March 1913	A	Reading	L	0–1		15,000	8
22 March 1913	H	West Ham	L	0–1		15,000	8
24 March 1913	H	Reading	D	1–1	Gaul	14,000	8
29 March 1913	A	Brighton	L	1–4	Birch	5,000	8
5 April 1913	H	Coventry	W	4–0	Gaul, Whyman, Birch, Revill	6,000	8
10 April 1913	H	Bristol R	W	2–0	Revill, Birch	4,000	8
12 April 1913	A	Watford	W	2–1	Gaul, Ovens	4,000	6
19 April 1913	H	Merthyr Town	W	4–1	Ives 2, Gaul, Revill	7,000	5
23 April 1913	A	Plymouth	L	0–2		10,000	6
26 April 1913	A	Crystal P	W	2–1	Birch, Gaul	8,000	4

=== London Challenge Cup ===
Round	Date	Venue	Opponent	Result	Score F–A	Scorers	Attendance
LCC 1	18 Sep	H	London Caledonians	W	5-1	Browning 3, Strang (og), Whyman	1,500
LCC 2	21 Oct	A	West Ham	L	0–2		4,000

=== Southern Professional Charity Cup ===
Round	Date	Venue	Opponent	Result	Score F–A	Scorers	Attendance
SCC 1	20 November 1912	A	Gillingham	W	1–0	Birch	1,000
SCC 2	13 February 1913	H	Crystal P	W	7–1	Revill, Whyman 3, Birch, Mitchell, Wake	3,000
SCC SF	3 April 1913	H	Exeter	W	2–0	Revill, Birch	2,500
SCC F	28 April 1913	the Den	Brighton	W	4–1"	Gaul, Birch 2, Mitchell (pen)	3,000

=== London Professional Charity Fund ===
Date	Venue	Opponent	Result	Score F–A	Scorers	Attendance
7 October 1912	A	Clapton Orient	W	2–1 (a.e.t.)	Birch, Barnes	4,000

=== Ealing Hospital Cup (Final) ===
Date	Venue	Opponent	Result	Score F–A	Scorers	Attendance
30 October 1912	A	Brentford	L	0–1		2,000

=== FA Cup ===
Round	Date	Venue	Opponent	Result	Score F–A	Scorers	Attendance
Fifth round qualifying	Saturday 14 December 1912			Bye			
First Round	11 January 1913	H	Halifax Town (Midland League)	W	4–2	Revill, Birch, Whyman, Ovens	9,000
Second Round	1 February 1913	A	Middlesbrough (First Division)	L	2–3	Birch 2 (1 pen)	27,774

== Squad ==
Position	Nationality	Name	Southern League Appearances	Southern League Goals	FA Cup Appearances	FA Cup Goals
GK	(England)	F.W Matthews				
GK	(England)	Harry Jefferies				
GK	(England)	Alfred Nicholls	1			
GK	(Scotland)	Charlie Shaw	37		2	
DF	(England)	Billy Draper				
DF	(England)	Joe Wingrove	1			
DF	(England)	Harry Pullen	37		2	
DF	(England)	Joseph Wilde				
DF	(England)	Dan Higgins	2			
DF	(England)	Gilbert Ovens	31	2	2	1
DF	(England)	Francis Weblin	9			
DF	(England)	Joe Fidler	5		2	
DF	(Scotland)	John Macdonald	21			
MF	(England)	Jack Gregory	4			
MF	(England)	Archie Mitchell	38	1	2	
MF	(England)	Jack Broster	7			
MF	(England)	Alf Whyman	21	2	2	1
MF	(England)	Bill Wake	27		2	
MF	(England)	Andy Thompson				
MF	(England)	David Anderson	3	1		
FW	(England)	Jimmy Birch	38	16	2	3
FW	(England)	Billy Thompson	30	1	2	
FW	(England)	Ben Ives	1	2		
FW	(England)	John Miller				
FW	(England)	Herbert Strugnell				
FW	(England)	William Gaul	12	6		
FW	(Republic of Ireland)	Jimmy Fortune				
FW	(England)	Teddy Revill	26	8	2	1
FW	(England)	Billy Barnes	34	1	2	
FW	(England)	Bob Browning	12	1		
FW	(England)	Dan McKie	9	3		
FW	(England)	Vincent Jackman	3			
FW	(England)	James Sangster	4			
FW	(England)	Richard Day	4			
FW	(England)	Harry Thornton	1			

== Transfers in ==
Name	from	Date	Fee
Francis Weblin	West Norwood	cs1912	
Jack Broster	Chorley	6 July 1912	
Billy Thompson	Haslingden	23 July 1912	
Jack Gregory	Willenhall Swifts	25 July 1912	
David Anderson	Preston	20 July 1912	
Joseph Wilde	Burnley	20 August 1912	
Brooks, George	Southall	31 Aug 1912	
Bloom, H A *	Shepherd's Bush	Sep 1912	
Dan Higgins	Kingston-on-Thames	Jan 1913	
Scotchbrook, Ernest *		Feb 1913	
Bruton, A C *	Kilburn	Mar 1913	
Barron, Harrie *	Shelbourne	Mar 1913	
Lincoln, A J *		Mar 1913	
Willcox, Frederick *		Mar 1913	
Joe Wingrove	Uxbridge	Mar 1913	
Richard Day	Haslingden	7 Mar 1913	
Ben Ives	Exeter	1 April 1913	£300
John Miller	Vale of Leven	5 May 1913	
Jimmy Fortune	Barrow	6 May 1913	
Herbert Strugnell	Aston Villa	22 May 1913	
Andy Thompson	Gateshead	3 June 1913	
Ingham, James	Haslingden	16 June 1913	
Harry Jefferies	Aberdare	30 June 1913	
Billy Draper		cs1913	
Read, Albert *	Uxbridge	cs1913	
Saunders, John		cs1913	
Cater, William	Kilburn	cs1913	
Lockwood, James *	Ipswich Town	cs1913	
Matthews, F W *	Hampstead Town	cs1913	

== Transfers out ==
Name	from	Date	Fee	Date	To	Fee
Matthews, F W *	Harlesden	cs1911		cs 12	Hampstead Town	
Syms, W *	Southall	cs1911		cs 12	Southall	
Lawrence, Sidney *		Aug1911		cs 12		
Robinson, Jimmy *	Stourbridge	12 May 1911		cs 12		
Gorman, William *	Wycombe Wanderers	July1911		cs 12	Wycombe	
Baker, Billy *	Northfleet U	Aug1911		cs 12	Dartford	
Hartwell, Ambrose	Bradford Park Avenue	21 May 1909		Aug 1912	Kidderminster	£30
Butterworth, Herbert	Oldham	8 Aug 1910		Aug 1912	Millwall	
Levi, Harold	Norwich	15 May 1911		Sep 1912	Gillingham	
King, Alex	Southend	18 July 1911		Sep 1912	Chatham	
Burke, William	Croydon Common	cs1912		Oct 1912		
Bloom, H A *	Shepherd's Bush	Sep1912		Nov 1912		
Marchant, George *	Tufnell Park	Mar1912		Dec 1912	Hampstead Town	
Joe Fidler	Fulham	18 May 1906		Feb 1913	Woolwich Arsenal	
Bob Browning	Kettering Town	3 May 1910		Feb 1913	Southampton	
David Anderson	Preston	20 July 1912		Mar 1913	Swansea Town	
Radnage, Joe *	Shepherd's Bush	cs1909		Apr 1913	Oxford City	
Charlie Shaw	Port Glasgow Athletic	18 May 1907		May 1913	Celtic	£650
Handford, Ernest		cs1899		May 1913	Retired	
John Macdonald	Grimsby	9 Sep 1907		May 1913	Retired	
Billy Barnes	Luton	3 May 1907		May 1913	Southend	Free
Teddy Revill	Chesterfield	2 Aug 1911		May 1913	Chesterfield	
Brooks, George	Southall	31 Aug 1912		May 1913		
Dan McKie	Chorley	3 May 1910		June 1913	Merthyr Town	
Bruton, A C *	Kilburn	Mar1913		cs 13		
Scotchbrook, Ernest *		Feb1913		cs 13	Summerstown	
Barron, Harrie *	Shelbourne	Mar1913		cs 13		
Lincoln, A J *		Mar1913		cs 13		
Willcox, Frederick *		Mar1913		cs 13		
