= 1909–10 Queens Park Rangers F.C. season =

English football club season

Queens Park Rangers
1909–10 season
- Chairman: J. H. Fielding
- Manager: James Cowan
- Stadium: New Park Royal
- Southern League Division One: Third
- FA Cup: 4th round
- London Challenge Cup: Semi Final
- Top goalscorer: League: Billy Steer 18; All: Billy Steer 24
- Highest home attendance: 25,000 (25 March 1910) vs Brentford
- Lowest home attendance: 4,000 (4 October 1909) vs Reading
- Biggest win: 4–0 (18 October 1909) vs Coventry, (19 March 1910) vs Luton
- Biggest defeat: 0–4 (28 December 1909) vs Coventry,(23 April 1910) vs Portsmouth
Home colours	Away colours

The 1909–10 Queens Park Rangers season was the club's 22nd season of existence and their 11th season in the Southern League Division One, the top non-league division of football in England at the time.

== Season summary ==
In the 1909–10 season QPR continued play in the Southern League Division One and finished third. In the FA Cup Qpr were beaten by beaten Finalist Barnsley in the last eight.

=== Southern League Division One ===
Pos	Team	Pld	W	D	L	GF	GA	GR	Pts
1	Brighton & Hove Albion	42	23	13	6	69	28	2.464	59
2	Swindon Town	42	22	10	10	92	46	2.000	54
3	Queens Park Rangers	42	19	13	10	56	47	1.191	51
4	Northampton Town	42	22	4	16	90	44	2.045	48
5	Southampton	42	16	16	10	64	55	1.164	48

=== Results ===
QPR scores given first

Win Draw Loss

=== Southern League Division One ===
Date	Venue	Opponent	Result	Score F–A	Scorers	Attendance	League Position
1 September 1909	H	Watford	W	4–3	Hartwell, Whyman 2, Travers (pen)	5,000	7
4 September 1909	A	Southend	W	1–0	Barnes	5,000	5
8 September 1909	A	Watford	D	1–1	McNaught	3,000	5
11 September 1909	H	Leyton	W	2–1	Whyman, Steer	14,000	2
18 September 1909	A	Plymouth	W	2–0	Steer, McNaught	9,000	2
25 September 1909	H	Southampton	D	1–1	Steer	13,000	4
2 October 1909	A	Croydon Common	W	3–0	Steer, Travers 2	5,000	2
4 October 1909	H	Reading	W	1–0	Steer	4,000	2
9 October 1909	H	Millwall	L	1–2	McNaught	16,000	3
16 October 1909	A	New Brompton	D	1–1	Greer	7,000	5
18 October 1909	H	Coventry	W	4–0	Greer 3, Travers	5,000	2
23 October 1909	H	Northampton	W	2–0	Steer, Barnes	10,000	2
30 October 1909	H	Exeter	W	2–0	Barnes, McNaught	10,000	2
6 November 1909	A	Luton	D	1–1	Steer	7,000	3
13 November 1909	H	Swindon	L	0–3		12,000	3
20 November 1909	A	Crystal P	W	1–0	Steer	12,000	2
27 November 1909	H	Brighton	W	1–0	Steer	8,000	1
4 December 1909	A	West Ham	W	2–1	Barnes, Hartwell	14,000	1
11 December 1909	H	Portsmouth	L	3–5	Steer, Whyman, Greer	8,000	2
25 December 1909	H	Norwich	W	1–0	Wilson	20,000	2
28 December 1909	A	Coventry	L	0–4		7,000	4
1 January 1910	A	Brentford	W	1–0	Steer	12,000	3
8 January 1910	H	Southend	D	2–2	Steer 2	6,000	2
22 January 1910	A	Leyton	W	1–0	Steer	7,000	1
29 January 1910	H	Plymouth	W	2–1	Whyman, Travers	7,000	1
12 February 1910	H	Croydon Common	D	4–4	Travers, Whyman, Barnes 2	6,000	2
26 February 1910	H	New Brompton	W	1–0	Steer	8,000	2
12 March 1910	A	Exeter	D	0–0		6,000	3
14 March 1910	A	Bristol R	L	0–2		10,000	3
19 March 1910	H	Luton	W	4–0	Barnes 2, Steer 2	6,000	2
25 March 1910	H	Brentford	D	0–0		25,000	2
28 March 1910	A	Norwich	D	0–0		10,000	2
30 March 1910	A	Reading	D	0–0		2,000	2
2 April 1910	H	Crystal P	L	1–2	Swann	10,000	2
7 April 1910	A	Northampton	D	0–0		3,000	2
9 April 1910	A	Brighton	L	0–2		10,000	3
13 April 1910	A	Southampton	D	1–1	Steer (pen)	3,000	3
16 April 1910	H	West Ham	D	3–3	Barnes, Travers, Whyman	7,000	3
18 April 1910	A	Millwall	L	0–1		9,000	3
23 April 1910	A	Portsmouth	L	0–4		6,000	3
27 April 1910	A	Swindon	L	0–1		3,000	3
30 April 1910	H	Bristol R	W	2–1	Whyman, Mitchell (pen)	6,000	3

=== London Challenge Cup ===
Round	Date	Venue	Opponent	Result	Score F–A	Scorers	Attendance
LCC 1	16 September 1909	Upton Park	Clapton	W	4-2	Whyman 2, Greer, Barnes	2,241
LCC 2	11 October 1909	A	Chelsea	W	1–0	Whyman	8,000
LCC SF	8 November 1909	Stamford Bridge	Tottenham	D	0–0		20,000
LCC SF Rep	15 November 1909	Craven Cottage	Tottenham	L	1–4	Steer	10,000

=== Southern Professional Charity Cup ===
Round	Date	Venue	Opponent	Result	Score F–A	Scorers	Attendance
SCC 1	27 September 1909	H	Crystal P	W	3–1	Travers 2, Greer	2,500
SCC 2	1 November 1909	H	Southend	W	2–1	Travers, Mitchell	1,000
SCC SF	9 March 1910	A	Watford	L	0–1		

=== London Professional Charity Fund ===
Date	Venue	Opponent	Result	Score F–A	Scorers	Attendance
22 November 1909	H	Brentford	W	3–1	Whyman, McNaught, Steer	3,000

=== FA Cup ===
Round	Date	Venue	Opponent	Result	Score F–A	Scorers	Attendance
Fifth round qualifying	Saturday 4 December 1909			Bye			
First Round	15 January 1910	A	Norwich City (Southern League)	D	0–0		9,295
First Round Replay	19 January 1910	H	Norwich City (Southern League)	W	3–0	Steer, McNaught, Whyman	5,642
Second Round	5 February 1910	A	Southend United (Southern League)	D	0–0		5,000
Second Round Replay	9 February 1910	H	Southend United (Southern League)	W	3–2	Steer 3	11,000
Third Round	19 February 1910	H	West Ham United (Southern League)	D	1–1	Steer	31,000
Third Round Replay	24 February 1910	A	West Ham United (Southern League)	W	0–1	Steer	18,500
Fourth Round	5 March 1910	A	Barnsley (Second Division)	L	0–1		23,574

== Squad ==
Position	Nationality	Name	Southern League Appearances	Southern League Goals	FA Cup Appearances	FA Cup Goals
GK	(England)	Alfred Nicholls				
GK	(Scotland)	Charlie Shaw	42		7	
DF	(England)	Harry Pullen				
DF	(England)	Joe Fidler	39		7	
DF	(Scotland)	John Macdonald	38		7	
DF	(England)	Thomas (Ginger) Leigh				
DF	(Scotland)	Willie Logan	7			
DF	(England)	Frank Wentworth	7			
MF	(England)	Archie Mitchell	30	1	7	
MF	(England)	Alf Whyman	39	8	7	
MF	(England)	Bill Wake	39		7	
MF	(England)	Sam Morris	7			
MF	(England)	Ambrose Hartwell	39	2	7	
MF	(England)	Joe Radnage	2			
MF	(England)	Billy Brown				
MF	(Scotland)	Dan Ferguson			2	
MF	(England)	Joseph Dines	1			
MF	(England)	Andy Wyatt	10			
FW	(England)	Billy Barnes	40	9	7	
FW	(England)	Bob Browning				
FW	(England)	Dan McKie				
FW	(England)	Arthur Smith				
FW	(England)	Joe Bradshaw				
FW	(England)	Thomas Wilson	1	1		
FW	(Scotland)	John McNaught	29	4	5	
FW	(England)	Billy Steer	38	18	7	
FW	(England)	Horace Brindley				
FW	(Republic of Ireland)	Bill Greer	16	5		
FW	(England)	George Travers	34	7	7	
FW	(England)	Herbert Swann	4	1		

== Transfers in ==
Name	from	Date	Fee
Ward, S *		cs1909	
Gibson, H A	Wood Green Town	cs1909	
Bullock, Fred *	Ilford	cs1909	
Leat, Edwin *		cs1909	
Ward, S *		cs1909	
Joe Radnage	Shepherd's Bush	cs1909	
Ward, S *		cs1909	
Leat, Edwin *		cs1909	
Billy Steer	Kingston-on-Thames	17 Aug 1909	
Jennings, T *		Sep1909	
Richards, G *		Sep1909	
Jennings, T *		Sep1909	
Leonard, A *		Sep1909	
Jones, H		Oct1909	
Prodham, Valentine *		Oct1909	
Jones, H		Oct1909	
Gibson, W		Nov1909	
Porter, B		Nov1909	
Gibson, W		Nov1909	
Porter, B		Nov1909	
Woodthorpe, Bernard *	Sheffield United	Nov1909	
Thomas Wilson	Clapton	Dec1909	
Dan Ferguson	Wishaw Thistle	24 Dec 1909	
Andy Wyatt	Uxbridge	Jan1910	
Hughes, H		Feb1910	
Dale, G		Mar1910	
Barbour, J *		Mar1910	
Dale, G		Mar1910	
Joe Dines	King's Lynn	Apr1910	
Billy Brown	Civil Service	May1910	
Dan McKie	Chorley	3 May 1910	
Horace Brindley	Crewe	9 May 1910	
Joe Bradshaw	Chelsea	3 May 1910	
Bob Browning	Kettering Town	3 May 1910	
Harry Pullen	Kettering Town	4 May 1910	
Thomas (Ginger) Leigh	Fulham	17 May 1910	
Burton, Frank (Bronco)	Kilburn	cs1910	
Davis, A		cs1910	

== Transfers out ==
Name	from	Date	Fee	Date	To	Fee
Berry, George		Sep1907		cs 1909		
Snellgrove, George	Sittingbourne	Mar 1910,1908		cs 1909		
Skilton, Percy *	Harrow	Apr1904		cs 1909	Enfield	
Johnson, C		Feb1909		cs 1909		
Gillespie, Jim	Third Lanark	12 May 1908		Aug 1909	Clyde	
Drake, Alonzo	Birmingham	25 July 1908		Sep 1909	Huddersfield	
Bean, F *		Oct1908		Sep 1909		
Kemp, Sydney *		Apr 1909		Sep 1909	Bromley	
Gibson, H A	Wood Green Town	cs1909		Sep 1909	Wood Green Town	
Bullock, Fred *	Ilford	cs1909		Oct 1909	Ilford	
McKenzie, Tommy	Glossop	2 May 1908		Oct 1909	West Stanley	
Woodthorpe, Bernard *	Sheffield United	Nov1909		Nov 1909	Huddersfield	
Leonard, A *		Sep1909		Dec 1909		
McDonald, James	Aberdeen	8 May 1908		Dec 1909	Mardy	
Thomas Wilson	Clapton	Dec1909		Jan 1910	Clapton	
Ashman, Harry *		Apr1909		Jan 1910	Kilburn	
Prodham, Valentine *		Oct1909		Jan 1910	Shepherd's Bush	
Herbert Swann	Crystal P	4 May 1909		May 1910		
Jones, H		Oct1909		cs 1910		
Porter, B		Nov1909		cs 1910		
Clark, J *		Apr1909		cs 1910		
Myerscough, J *		Apr1909		cs 1910		
Leat, Edwin *		cs1909		cs 1910	Shepherd's Bush	
Gibson, W		Nov1909		cs 1910		
Dale, G		Mar1910		cs 1910		
King, Robert *	Chertsey Town	31 Oct 1908		cs 1910		
Riddy, Percy *		Apr 1909		cs 1910		
Richards, G *		Sep1909		cs 1910		
Jennings, T *		Sep1909		cs 1910		
Hughes, H		Feb1910		cs 1910		
Barbour, J *		Mar1910		cs 1910		
