= 1910–11 Queens Park Rangers F.C. season =

English football club season

Queens Park Rangers
1910–11 season
- Chairman: J. H. Fielding
- Manager: James Cowan
- Stadium: New Park Royal
- Southern League Division One: 6th
- FA Cup: 1st round
- London Challenge Cup: 1st round
- Top goalscorer: League: Bob Browning 18; All: Bob Browning 18
- Highest home attendance: 15,000 (3 September 1910) Vs Coventry, (17 September 1910) Vs Millwall, (1 October 1910) Vs West Ham, 3 December 1910) Vs Brentford,(14 April 1911) Vs Southend
- Lowest home attendance: 4,000 (17 December 1910) Vs Watford
- Biggest win: 5–0 (3 September 1910) Vs Coventry, (7 January 1911) Vs New Brompton
- Biggest defeat: 0–3 (1 October 1910) Vs West Ham
Home colours	Away colours

The 1910–11 Queens Park Rangers season was the club's 23rd season of existence and their 12th season in the Southern League Division One, the top non-league division of football in England at the time.

== Season summary ==
In the 1910–11 season QPR continued play in the Southern League Division One and finished sixth.

=== Southern League Division One ===
Pos	Team	Pld	W	D	L	GF	GA	GR	Pts
2	Northampton Town	38	18	12	8	54	27	2.000	48
3	Brighton & Hove Albion	38	20	8	10	58	36	1.611	48
4	Crystal Palace	38	17	13	8	55	48	1.146	47
5	West Ham United	38	17	11	10	63	46	1.370	45
6	Queens Park Rangers	38	13	14	11	52	41	1.268	40

=== Results ===
QPR scores given first

Win Draw Loss

=== Southern League Division One ===
Date	Venue	Opponent	Result	Score F–A	Scorers	Attendance	League Position
3 September 1910	H	Coventry	W	5–0	Bradshaw 2, Whyman 2, Hartwell	15,000	1
10 September 1910	A	New Brompton	L	0–1		10,000	7
12 September 1910	H	West Ham	L	0–2		14,000	8
17 September 1910	H	Millwall	W	2–1	Barnes, McKie	15,000	8
24 September 1910	A	Norwich	D	0–0		9,000	8
1 October 1910	A	West Ham	L	0–3		15,000	10
8 October 1910	H	Luton	D	3–3	Steer, Browning, McNaught	12,000	13
15 October 1910	A	Portsmouth	D	1–1	Browning	9,000	10
22 October 1910	H	Northampton	D	1–1	Steer	10,000	11
29 October 1910	A	Brighton	L	1–2	Steer	12,000	12
5 November 1910	H	Exeter	W	1–0	Browning	8,000	12
12 November 1910	A	Swindon	L	1–2	Browning	8,000	12
19 November 1910	H	Bristol R	L	1–2	Steer	9,000	13
26 November 1910	A	Crystal P	L	1–2	Browning	6,000	14
3 December 1910	H	Brentford	W	2–0	Browning, Whyman	15,000	12
10 December 1910	A	Leyton	L	1–2	Browning	4,000	13
17 December 1910	H	Watford	W	4–1	Browning 3, McKie	4,000	12
24 December 1910	A	Plymouth	D	1–1	Steer	8,000	11
26 December 1910	A	Southampton	L	0–1		10,000	13
27 December 1910	H	Southampton	W	3–1	McKie 2, Whyman	12,000	12
31 December 1910	A	Coventry	L	2–3	Browning, McKie	6,000	12
7 January 1911	H	New Brompton	W	5–0	Whyman, Steer 2, Browning 2	5,000	12
21 January 1911	A	Millwall	D	1–1	Steer	6,000	12
28 January 1911	H	Norwich	D	1–1	Browning	6,000	12
11 February 1911	A	Luton	W	1–0	McKie	6,000	11
18 February 1911	H	Portsmouth	W	1–0	McKie	7,000	9
25 February 1911	A	Northampton	D	0–0		5,000	10
4 March 1911	H	Brighton	D	0–0		6,000	11
11 March 1911	A	Exeter	D	2–2	McKie, Steer	8,000	10
18 March 1911	H	Swindon	W	1–0	Browning	8,000	8
25 March 1911	A	Bristol R	D	0–0		6,000	8
1 April 1911	H	Crystal P	D	0–0		8,000	8
8 April 1911	A	Brentford	D	1–1	Hartwell	8,000	8
14 April 1911	H	Southend	D	1–1	Browning	15,000	8
15 April 1911	H	Leyton	W	5–3	McKie 3, Whyman, Newton (og)	7,000	7
17 April 1911	A	Southend	W	2–1	Barnes, Browning	6,000	6
22 April 1911	A	Watford	L	0–2		6,000	8
29 April 1911	H	Plymouth	W	1–0	Browning	6,000	6

=== London Challenge Cup ===
Round	Date	Venue	Opponent	Result	Score F–A	Scorers	Attendance
LCC 1	19 September 1910	A	Woolwich Arsenal	L	0-3		1,800

=== Southern Professional Charity Cup ===
Round	Date	Venue	Opponent	Result	Score F–A	Scorers	Attendance
SCC 1	3 October 1910	H	New Brompton	W	4–1	McNaught, Browning 3	2,000
SCC 2	26 October 1910	A	Southend	D	1–1	Whyman	
SCC 2 Rep	31 October 1910	H	Southend	W	5–3	Brindley, Browning 3, McKie	2,000
SCC SF	28 November 1910	Stamford Bridge	Swindon	D	1–1	Steer	4,000
SCC Re	12 December 1910	Craven Cottage	Swindon	D	1–1	Butterworth	2,000
SCC Re	3 April 1911	Stamford Bridge	Swindon	D	0–0*after 105 mins		4,500
SCC SF Rep	18 April 1911	White Hart Lane	Swindon	L	2–3'	McNaught 2	5,414

=== London Professional Charity Fund ===
Date	Venue	Opponent	Result	Score F–A	Scorers	Attendance
17 October 1910	H	Brentford	W	2–0	Steer, Brindley	2,000

=== Ealing Hospital Cup (Final) ===
Date	Venue	Opponent	Result	Score F–A	Scorers	Attendance
28 April 1911	A	Brentford	L	0–4		2,000

=== FA Cup ===
Round	Date	Venue	Opponent	Result	Score F–A	Scorers	Attendance
Fifth round qualifying	Saturday 3 December 1910			Bye			
First Round	14 January 1911	A	Bradford Park Avenue (Second Division)	L	3–5	Steer, McKie 2	25,000

== Squad ==
Position	Nationality	Name	Southern League Appearances	Southern League Goals	FA Cup Appearances	FA Cup Goals
GK	(England)	F.W Matthews				
GK	(England)	Alfred Nicholls				
GK	(Scotland)	Charlie Shaw	38		1	
DF	(England)	Harry Pullen	1			
DF	(England)	Joe Fidler	35		1	
DF	(Scotland)	John Macdonald	35		1	
DF	(England)	Herbert Butterworth	25		1	
DF	(England)	Thomas (Ginger) Leigh	5			
MF	(England)	Archie Mitchell	32		1	
MF	(England)	Alf Whyman	28		1	
MF	(England)	Bill Wake	28	6		
MF	(England)	Sam Morris	9		1	
MF	(England)	Ambrose Hartwell	19	2		
MF	(England)	Joe Radnage	1			
MF	(England)	Billy Brown	7			
MF	(Scotland)	Robert Law	1			
FW	(England)	Billy Barnes	29			
FW	(England)	Bob Browning	31	18	1	
FW	(England)	Dan McKie	28	11	1	2
FW	(England)	Vincent Jackman				
FW	(England)	Arthur Smith				
FW	(England)	Joe Bradshaw	2	2		
FW	(England)	Thomas Wilson	6			
FW	(Scotland)	John McNaught	12	1		
FW	(England)	Billy Steer	28	9	1	1
FW	(England)	Horace Brindley	17		1	

== Transfers in ==
Name	from	Date	Fee
Burton, Frank (Bronco)	Kilburn	cs1910	
Davis, A		cs1910	
Thomas Wilson	Clapton	18 July 1910	
Martin, George *	King's Lynn	Aug1910	
Sentance, Martin		Aug1910	
Herbert Butterworth	Oldham	8 Aug 1910	
Noble, Robert *	Bromley	Nov1910	
Dilley, Reginald *	Bromley	Dec 1910	
Vincent Jackman		Mar1911	
Robert Law	Falkirk	Apr1911	
Robinson, Jimmy *	Stourbridge	12 May 1911	
Levi, Harold	Norwich	15 May 1911	
Syms, W *	Southall	cs1911	
Matthews, F W *	Harlesden	cs1911	

== Transfers out ==
Name	from	Date	Fee	Date	To	Fee
Martin, George *	King's Lynn	Aug1910		Nov 1910	Ilford	
Jones, H		Oct1909		cs1910		
Porter, B		Nov1909		cs1910		
Clark, J *		Apr1909		cs1910		
Myerscough, J *		Apr1909		cs1910		
Leat, Edwin *		cs1909		cs1910	Shepherd's Bush	
Gibson, W		Nov1909		cs1910		
Dale, G		Mar1910		cs1910		
King, Robert *	Chertsey Town	31 Oct 1908		cs1910		
Riddy, Percy *		Apr 1909		cs1910		
Richards, G *		Sep1909		cs1910		
Jennings, T *		Sep1909		cs1910		
Hughes, H		Feb1910		cs1910		
Barbour, J *		Mar1910		cs1910		
Greer, Bill	Dumbarton	14 Dec 1908	£75	July 1910	Dumbarton	
Travers, George	Aston Villa	4 May 1909		August 1910	Leicester	
Dines, Joe *	King's Lynn	Apr1910		August 1910	Ilford	
Ferguson, Dan	Wishaw Thistle	24 Dec 1909		August 1910	Royal Albert	
Goodfellow, William	Salisbury City	6 May 1909		August 1910	Salisbury City	
Wentworth, Frank	Salisbury City	6 May 1909		September 1910	Salisbury City	
Wyatt, Andy *	Uxbridge	Jan1910		October 1910	Uxbridge	
Logan, Willie	Vale of Leven	17 May 1909		October 1910	Rangers	
Joe Bradshaw	Chelsea	3 May 1910		Feb 1911	Southend (Player/Manager)	
Davis, A		cs1910		cs 1911		
Ward, S *		cs1909		cs 1911	Tufnell Park	
Noble, Robert *	Bromley	Nov1910		cs 1911	Bromley	
Sentance, Martin		Aug1910		cs 1911	Nunhead	
