= Frank Burton (footballer, born 1890) =

English footballer

Personal information
- Full name: Frank James Burton
- Date of birth: 7 September 1890
- Place of birth: Cheadle, Cheshire, England
- Date of death: 8 July 1967 (aged 76)
- Place of death: Northcote, Auckland, New Zealand
- Position: Full-back

Senior career*
Years	Team	Apps	(Gls)
- Kilburn
1910–1912	Queens Park Rangers	0	(0)
1912–1921	West Ham United	114	(6)
1921–1925	Charlton Athletic	97	(0)
1925–?	Grays Thurrock United		

Managerial career
- 1927–1928: Real Oviedo
- * Club domestic league appearances and goals

Frank James "Bronco" Burton (7 September 1890 – 8 July 1967) was an English professional footballer who played as full-back for West Ham United and Charlton Athletic in the Football League, and also for Queens Park Rangers and Grays Thurrock United. He was later head coach of Spanish club Real Oviedo.

== Life and career ==
Born in Cheadle, Stockport, (Note: Due to an error on Burton's 1911 Census return, a number of sources list his birthplace as Luapanso or Luapagno, Mexico.) Burton played for Kilburn before joining Queens Park Rangers in the close season of 1910. He did not appear for the QPR first team before joining West Ham United in the summer of 1912. He made his debut for West Ham on 5 October 1912 in a 3–1 win at home to Plymouth Argyle, replacing the injured Harry Forster. He appeared mostly for the reserves in 1912–13 and became a regular for the first team in the second half of 1913–14, initially at left-half before settling into the left-back position. He totalled 50 appearances in the Southern League First Division, forming full-back partnerships with Jim Rothwell and then Billy Cope. He scored four goals during this period, against Southampton home and away during the 1913–14 season, and against Bristol Rovers and Southend United in 1914–15.

Burton's career was interrupted by World War I and he saw service between 1914 and 1918, as a serjeant in the Royal Fusiliers, including the Sportsmen's Battalions. He fought at Ypres, the Somme and Cambrai, and sustained six injuries during the conflict. He was treated for shrapnel wounds at the Welsh Metropolitan War Hospital, Whitchurch, in 1916. He was awarded the Croix de Guerre and Médaille militaire, amongst other medals, for his service. Despite this, he turned out for West Ham in the wartime London Combination, making 22 appearances in the 1915–16 season, 14 in 1916–17 and a further four in 1917–18.

After hostilities ended, West Ham were successful in their application to join the Football League for the upcoming 1919–20 season, and Burton formed part of the team that competed in the Second Division for the first time in the club's history. He missed the first two matches but returned for the away fixture against Lincoln City on 6 September 1919. He scored from the penalty spot in a 4–1 win, marking West Ham's first victory in the Football League. He gained winners' medals in the London Football Association Professional Charity Fund Cup in 1919 and 1920, with both finals contested against rival club Millwall. The first was won after a rematch. With the Hammers leading 4–3 at The Den, the match was abandoned, but they won the replayed fixture 3–1. A 1–0 victory proved sufficient for the 1920 final, held at The Den on 15 November.

In May 1921, he joined Charlton Athletic along with West Ham teammate Dan Bailey. Burton's move to Charlton had coincided with the club's conversion to professionalism and he was a part of the first line-up to compete in the Football League, alongside the likes of Arthur Whalley and Harold Halse. He participated in Charlton's FA Cup run in 1922–23, which saw them beat Manchester City, Preston North End and West Bromwich Albion to reach the fourth round. They were matched against Bolton Wanderers in a heavily attended fixture at The Valley, in which a number of spectators were injured after a section of the railings collapsed. Bolton won the game 1–0 and would go on to win the first final at Wembley Stadium against his former club West Ham. The season also saw Burton gain honours in the London Challenge Cup, with a 2–1 victory over Crystal Palace in the final. He played his final season for Charlton in 1924–25, partnering Baden Herod, before losing his place to Norman Smith. He made 97 league appearances in his four seasons with the club.

Burton joined Grays Thurrock United as player-trainer for the 1925–26 season. Grays Thurrock were in their second season of existence and were due to compete in the Kent League and the Southern League. They had also engaged the services of Charlton teammate Freddy Wood, as well as a number of other professional players.

On 20 August 1927, he became head coach of Real Oviedo in Asturias, Spain, becoming the club's second manager after fellow Englishman Fred Pentland. The club at that point were competing in the Regional Championship of Asturias. He left in January 1928, later to be replaced by Antonín Fivébr.

== Style of play ==
Burton could play in either full-back position. He was given the nickname Bronco while at West Ham due to his "loping gait and extraordinary onfield contortions", for which he was likened to a cowboy's horse.

== Career statistics ==
Club	Season	League			FA Cup		Total	
Club	Season	Division	Apps	Goals	Apps	Goals	Apps	Goals
Queens Park Rangers	1910–11	Southern League First Division	0	0	0	0	0	0
Queens Park Rangers	1911–12	Southern League First Division	0	0	0	0	0	0
Queens Park Rangers	Total		0	0	0	0	0	0
West Ham United	1912–13	Southern League First Division	5	0	0	0	5	0
West Ham United	1913–14	Southern League First Division	19	2	4	0	23	2
West Ham United	1914–15	Southern League First Division	26	2	2	0	28	2
West Ham United	1919–20	Football League Second Division	34	2	4	0	38	2
West Ham United	1920–21	Football League Second Division	30	0	1	0	31	0
West Ham United	Total		114	6	11	0	125	6
Charlton Athletic	1921–22	Football League Second Division	25	0	0	0	25	0
Charlton Athletic	1922–23	Football League Second Division	38	0	6	0	44	0
Charlton Athletic	1923–24	Football League Second Division	19	0	4	0	23	0
Charlton Athletic	1924–25	Football League Second Division	15	0	0	0	15	0
Charlton Athletic	Total		97	0	10	0	107	0
Career total			211	6	21	0	232	6
