= 1908 FA Charity Shield =

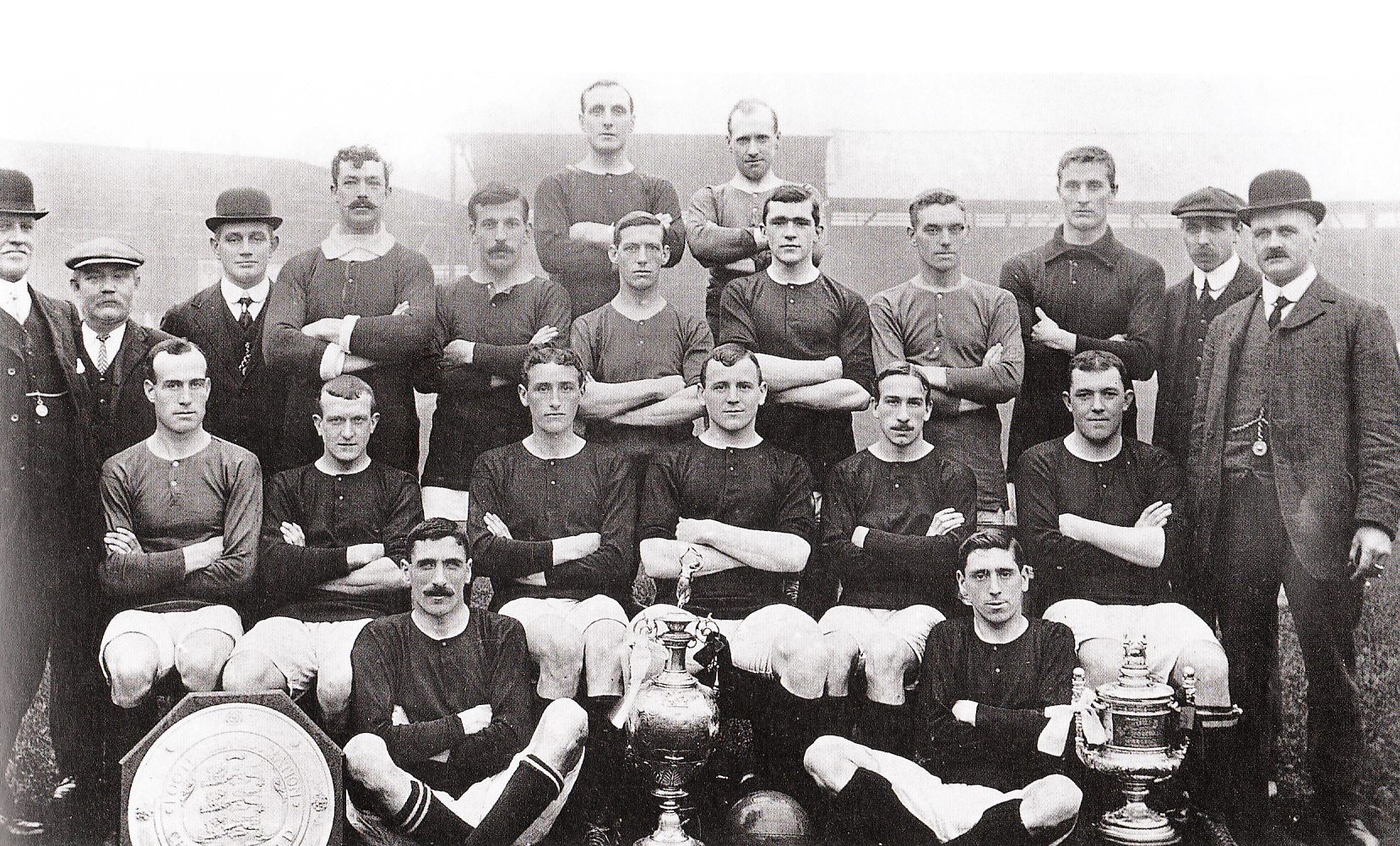
- The Manchester United team posing with the trophy
- Event: FA Charity Shield
Manchester United	Queens Park Rangers
The Football League	Southern Football League
Manchester United	Queens Park Rangers
1	1
- Date: 27 April 1908
- Venue: Stamford Bridge, London
- Attendance: 6,000
- Weather: Rain, turning to drizzle

Replay
Manchester United	Queens Park Rangers
4	0
- Date: 29 August 1908
- Venue: Stamford Bridge, London
- Referee: J. Howcroft, Lancashire
- Attendance: 50,000
- Weather: Dry and clear

The 1908 FA Charity Shield was the first Charity Shield, a football match contested by the winners of the previous season's Football League and Southern League competitions. It was intended as a replacement for the Sheriff of London Charity Shield, after The Football Association declined to provide a professional club to the organisers of that event for the annual amateurs vs. professionals match. The new match was subsequently arranged to take place at Chelsea F.C.'s home ground, Stamford Bridge. Following the conclusion of the respective leagues, 1907–08 Football League winners Manchester United were scheduled to play against 1907–08 Southern League champions Queens Park Rangers.

The first match was played on a very damp pitch in poor weather and ended in a 1–1 draw between the two sides, with the QPR goalkeeper Charlie Shaw also saving a penalty struck by George Stacey. Following the match it was thought that the two sides would share the honours, but instead at the suggestion of Arthur Kinnaird, 11th Lord Kinnaird, the match was replayed in late August. It was once again played at Stamford Bridge and the two teams fielded most of the same players with only a few exceptions. On this occasion the weather was far improved and the attendance by spectators was far higher with 50,000 fans attending. Manchester United won the game by four goals, and between the two matches more than £1000 was raised for charity.

== Match ==
=== Background ===
The Charity Shield was originally designed to be a game between professionals and amateurs. It had evolved from the Sheriff of London Charity Shield, a similar earlier competition which also pitted an amateur club versus a professional one. As late as February 1908, there were yet no plans to change the competition and the organisers of the Sheriff of London match were seeking to have the Football Association nominate a professional club to play either Corinthians or Queen's Park of Scotland. In response the FA told all their clubs to refuse to compete in the match and not allow the organisation to use their facilities for it either. This was as a result of the formation of the Amateur Football Association the previous year, who had broken away from the FA as they felt that it was for the good of amateur football.

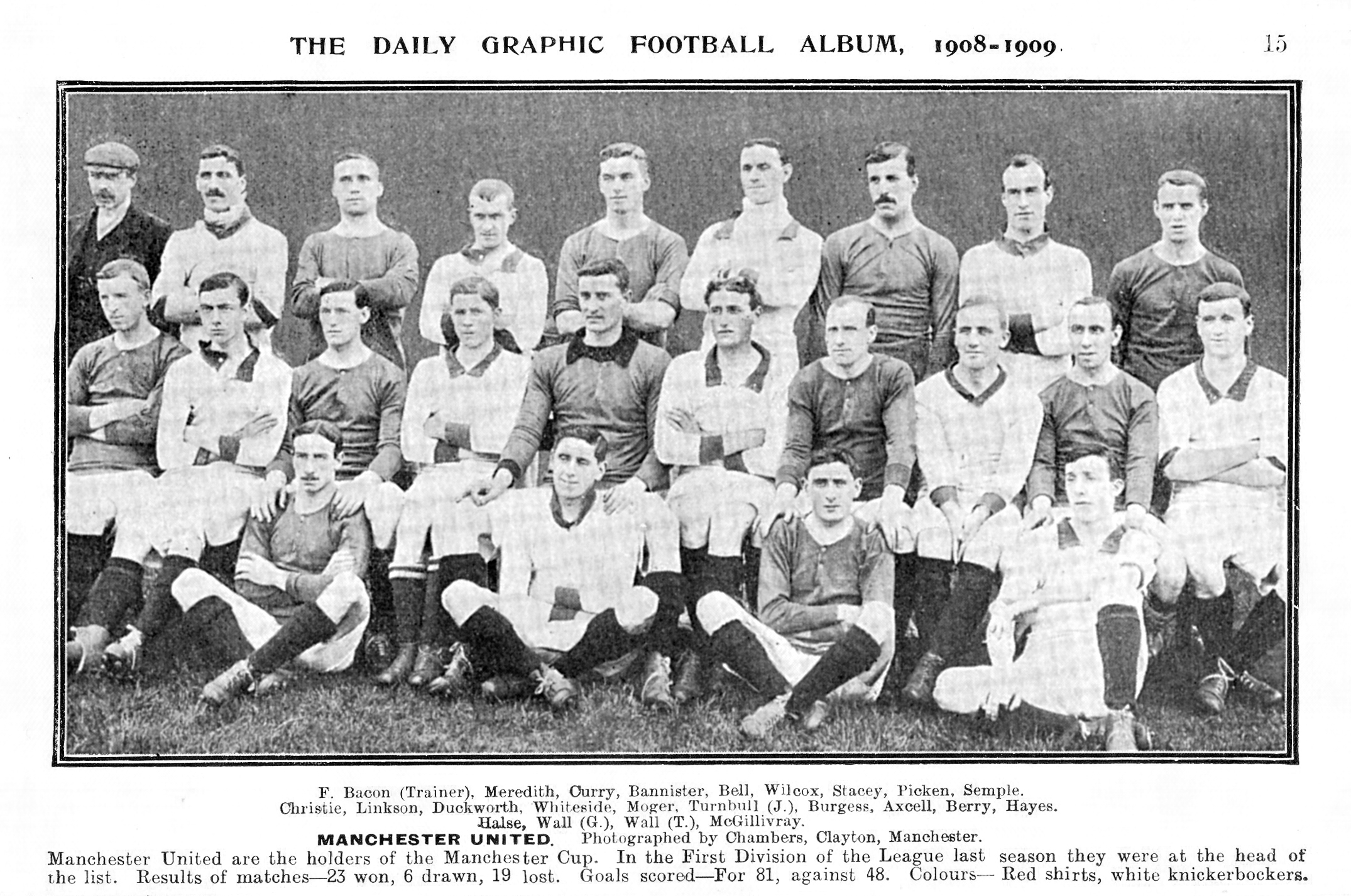
The Manchester United team from the start of the 1908 season.

An informal discussion between the organisers and the FA took place on 10 February, but they could not come to an agreement. In protest the organisers of the Sheriff of London Charity Shield wrote a public letter to Arthur Balfour, the leader of the Conservative Party and the Opposition. Balfour wrote back publicly to say that he was unhappy about the situation but did not feel qualify to intervene. It was subsequently announced in mid April that the match had been cancelled for the year.

Meanwhile, the Football Association organised their own Charity Shield, and on 22 February it was announced that the intention was to invite the winners of the 1907–08 Football League to play the champions of the 1907–08 Southern League at a location in London. It was proposed to play at the game at Stamford Bridge, home of Chelsea F.C., on 2 May but as the stadium was busy it was instead organised for 27 April. A week prior to the scheduled match, Queens Park Rangers were named the winners of the Southern League, qualifying them for the game. Around the same time, Manchester United won the Football League, pushing Aston Villa into second place. This meant that Manchester United were due to play Queens Park Rangers for the first FA Charity Shield. Both clubs agreed to take part in the match without charging any expenses, and likewise Chelsea F.C. allowed the match to take place at their Stamford Bridge ground for free. The rain prior to the match had made the pitch quite boggy, but reduced to drizzle by match time at 5:30 pm.

=== First half ===
Manchester United were initially surprised by the abilities of the Queens Park Rangers players, in particular the two full backs. They had the majority of the early play and in the eleventh minute Alfred Gittins and P. Skilton took the ball past the United half backs before passing it onto Frank Cannon. He dribbled it towards goal and scored past Moger. After the goal, the United team improved but Skilton nearly scored twice more for Rangers. Just before half time, United had a chance when Billy Meredith played a ball on for Jimmy Turnbull but an injury to a QPR player stopped play. Charlie Roberts took the ball for United immediately afterwards and took it into the area, but was fouled with a penalty awarded. George Stacey stepped up to take the shot, but Charlie Shaw in goal for Rangers got a hand to the ball and saved it.

=== Second half ===
United were improved once more following half-time with Meredith switched to the right side. He was receiving far more of the ball than in the first half and his ability to dribble the ball down the wing was causing problems for the QPR defence. On the 60th minute, Jimmy Bannister passed the ball out to Meredith once again who took the ball on towards Filder, the Rangers left-back. As he approached the defender he shot from outside the area past the QPR keeper to equalise for United. Manchester continued to keep the advantage after this, but the QPR defence was stubborn and Shaw in goal saved three more shots on target. The game ended in a 1–1 draw.

=== Details ===
27 April 1908
17:30

Manchester United	1–1	Queens Park Rangers
Meredith 60'	Report	Cannon 11'

Stamford Bridge, London
Attendance: 6,000

GK	(England) Harry Moger
RB	(England) George Stacey
LB	(England) Herbert Burgess
RH	(England) Dick Duckworth
CH	(England) Charlie Roberts (c)
LH	(Scotland) Alex Bell
OR	(Wales) Billy Meredith
IR	(England) Jimmy Bannister
CF	(Scotland) Jimmy Turnbull
IL	(Scotland) Sandy Turnbull
OL	(England) George Wall
Manager:
(England) Ernest Mangnall

GK	(Scotland) Charlie Shaw
RB	(Scotland) John MacDonald
LB	(England) Joe Fidler
RH	(England) Evelyn Lintott
CH	(Scotland) John McLean
LH	(England) Samuel Downing
OR	(England) Fred Pentland
IR	(England) Frank Cannon
CF	(England) Percy Skilton
IL	(England) Alfred Gittins
OL	(England) Billy Barnes
Manager:
(Scotland) James Cowan

== Replay ==
=== Background ===
Following the initial draw, it was expected that QPR and Manchester United would share the honours. However Arthur Kinnaird, 11th Lord Kinnaird suggested that it would be suitable to run a replay of the match in the autumn. It was eventually arranged to take place on 29 August, once again at Chelsea's Stamford Bridge stadium. Fred Pentland requested to play for QPR in the replay, despite having transferred to Middlesbrough following the first match; his request was declined by the directors of the club. It was the first professional match for former England international amateur player Evelyn Lintott, who had joined Rangers. Meanwhile, Manchester United had made a change from the first game with Jack Picken replacing Sandy Turnbull to partner George Wall on the left side of the attack. Unlike the first match, the weather was fine for the replay.

=== First half ===
The match was played at a speedy pace with Queens Park Rangers starting strong, holding the ball in the centre of the pitch. But they were soon in trouble from the combined work of Wall and Picken, who took a shot at goal which deflected off John MacDonald in the Rangers defence. Manchester United kept pressing the attack against their London opponents who were kept on the defensive for most of the first half. But MacNaught made a mistake for Rangers which led to Manchester forcing a corner. It was crossed in by Dick Duckworth, but the ball passed in front of an open goalmouth before being cleared. After 23 minutes Meredith crossed for Turnbull who headed the ball past Shaw to put Manchester United a goal up. Moments later, Picken took the ball into the QPR box and Shaw ran out to collect; but slipped, allowing Turnbull score another goal. Following a brief QPR counterattack, Bannister for Manchester drove in a powerful shot but Shaw punched the ball onto the underside of the crossbar and clear. Again Manchester attacked, with Turnbull firing in a shot which once again came off the crossbar; he attempted to convert the rebound but it ended up in the hands of Shaw. Just prior to half time, Manchester United drew a corner which resulted in a shot being sent over the bar by Cannon.

=== Second half ===
The second half saw most of the action once again taking place in the QPR half of the field. At one point Shaw was forced to run ten yards off his goal line and throw himself onto the ball, with Picken falling on top of him. Manchester United attacked once again straight away afterwards after Picken passed to Wall who struck the ball past the QPR keeper for his side's third goal. Rangers tried a few attacks but they were mostly uncoordinated, although one shot struck the crossbar. The fourth goal for Manchester United came late in the game when Roberts passed forward to Meredith who sent it into the area for Meredith to strike it into the net once more. Before the match finished, Bannister was taken off injured with United ending the game a player down. A trophy was awarded to the Manchester United players by Sir William Treloar.

=== Details ===
29 August 1908
16:00

Manchester United	4–0	Queens Park Rangers
J. Turnbull 25', 30', 75'; Wall 56'	Report

Stamford Bridge, London
Attendance: 50,000
Referee: Jack Howcroft, Lancashire

Manchester United
Queens Park Rangers

GK	(England) Harry Moger
RB	(England) George Stacey
LB	(England) Herbert Burgess
RH	(England) Dick Duckworth
CH	(England) Charlie Roberts (c)
LH	(Scotland) Alex Bell
OR	(Wales) Billy Meredith
IR	(England) Jimmy Bannister
CF	(Scotland) Jimmy Turnbull
IL	(Scotland) Jack Picken
OL	(England) George Wall
Manager:
(England) Ernest Mangnall

GK	(Scotland) Charlie Shaw
RB	(Scotland) John MacDonald
LB	J. Fidler
RH	(England) Evelyn Lintott
CH	(Scotland) John McLean
LH	(England) Samuel Downing
OR	J. MacNaught
IR	(England) Frank Cannon
CF	(England) Percy Skilton
IL	(England) Alfred Gittins
OL	(England) Billy Barnes
Manager:
(Scotland) James Cowan

== Post match ==
Following the matches it was announced by the Benevolent Fund and Charity Committee of the Football Association that the proceeds from both games after expenses amounted to £1,104 5s. 2d. Of this, Manchester United were allowed to allocate £300 to charities of their choice, and Queens Park Rangers could nominate which charities would receive £100. The Football Association chose to donate their portion of the money to a number of hospitals and children's homes. It is the only Charity or Community Shield to date to have featured a replay.
