= 1913–14 Queens Park Rangers F.C. season =

English football club season

Queens Park Rangers
1913–14 season
- Chairman: J. H. Fielding
- Manager: James Cowan resigned in November; Jimmy Howie appointed 19 November 1913
- Stadium: New Park Royal
- Southern League Division One: 8th
- FA Cup: 4th Round
- London Challenge Cup: 1st Round
- Top goalscorer: League: Jimmy Birch 15; All: Jimmy Birch 19
- Highest home attendance: 18,500 (10 April 1914) Vs Bristol Rovers
- Lowest home attendance: 3,000 (7 February 1914) Vs Southend
- Biggest win: 3–0 (22 November 1913) Vs Crystal Palace, (6 December 1913) Vs Coventry, (23 April 1914) Vs Brighton
- Biggest defeat: 1–4 (24 January 1914) Vs West Ham
Home colours	Away colours

The 1913–14 Queens Park Rangers season was the club's 26th season of existence and their 15th season in the Southern League Division One, the top non-league division of football in England at the time.

== Season summary ==
In the 1913–14 season Qpr continued play in the Southern League Division One and finished 8th. Rangers reached the last 8 in the FA Cup losing to First division and eventual FA Cup Finalist Liverpool .They were the last non-league team to reach the quarter-finals until Lincoln City in 2017.

=== Southern League Division One ===
Pos	Club	P	W	D	L	F	A	GA	Pts
5	Plymouth Argyle	38	15	13	10	46	42	1.095	43
6	West Ham United	38	15	12	11	61	60	1.017	42
7	Brighton & Hove Albion	38	15	12	11	43	45	0.956	42
8	Queens Park Rangers	38	16	9	13	45	43	1.047	41
9	Portsmouth	38	14	12	12	57	48	1.188	40

=== Results ===
QPR scores given first

Win Draw Loss

=== Southern League Division One ===
Date	Venue	Opponent	Result	Score F–A	Scorers	Attendance	League Position
1 September 1913	A	Swindon	L	0–3		7,000	16
6 September 1913	A	Gillingham	L	0–1		6,000	20
13 September 1913	H	Merthyr Town	L	0–1		10,000	20
20 September 1913	A	Northampton	D	2–2	Birch, Gaul	5,000	18
27 September 1913	H	West Ham	D	2–2	Miller, Birch	14,000	18
4 October 1913	A	Southend	W	2–1	Gregory 2	6,000	18
11 October 1913	H	Plymouth	D	0–0		7,000	18
18 October 1913	A	Brighton	L	0–1		6,000	18
25 October 1913	H	Southampton	W	3–1	Gregory, Miller 2	11,000	18
1 November 1913	A	Portsmouth	D	1–1	Pullen	12,000	17
8 November 1913	H	Reading	W	1–0	Miller	10,000	16
15 November 1913	A	Millwall	L	0–2		10,000	17
22 November 1913	H	Crystal P	W	3–0	Miller 2, Birch	10,000	14
29 November 1913	A	Exeter	D	0–0		6,300	12
6 December 1913	H	Coventry	W	3–0	Birch 2, Baldock	8,000	10
13 December 1913	A	Cardiff	L	0–3		12,000	11
20 December 1913	H	Watford	W	3–2	Birch 2, Mitchell (pen)	6,000	8
25 December 1913	H	Norwich	D	1–1	Birch	15,000	9
26 December 1913	A	Norwich	W	3–2	Miller 3	13,000	8
27 December 1913	H	Gillingham	D	0–0		8,000	7
3 January 1914	A	Merthyr Town	W	2–1	Birch, Gregory	7,000	6
17 January 1914	H	Northampton	D	0–0		10,000	8
24 January 1914	A	West Ham	L	1–4	Miller	11,000	9
7 February 1914	H	Southend	D	0–0		3,000	10
14 February 1914	A	Plymouth	L	0–2		5,000	12
28 February 1914	A	Southampton	W	2–0	Birch, Gregory	8,000	10
12 March 1914	H	Swindon	W	4–2	Miller, Birch, Skiller (og), Mitchell (pen)	8,000	9
21 March 1914	H	Millwall	W	1–0	Gregory	12,000	9
26 March 1914	H	Portsmouth	W	1–0	Gregory	6,000	7
28 March 1914	A	Crystal P	L	1–2	Whyman	7,000	8
4 April 1914	H	Exeter	L	2–3	Birch, Miller	5,000	8
10 April 1914	H	Bristol R	W	1–0	Birch	18,500	8
11 April 1914	A	Coventry	W	1–0	Birch	8,500	8
13 April 1914	A	Bristol R	L	1–2	Thompson	12,000	9
18 April 1914	H	Cardiff	L	0–2		8,000	9
23 April 1914	H	Brighton	W	3–0	Birch, Miller 2	7,000	8
25 April 1914	A	Watford	L	0–2		4,000	9
29 April 1914	A	Reading	W	1–0	Thompson	5,000	8

=== London Challenge Cup ===
Round	Date	Venue	Opponent	Result	Score F–A	Scorers	Attendance
LCC 1	22 September 1913	A	Woolwich Arsenal	D	1-1	Gregory	6,000
LCC Rep	29 September 1913	H	Woolwich Arsenal	L	2–3	Mitchell (pen), Miller	3,000

=== Southern Professional Charity Cup ===
Round	Date	Venue	Opponent	Result	Score F–A	Scorers	Attendance
SCC 1	3 November 1913	A	Brentford	W	2–1	Miller, Gregory	
SCC 2	19 February 1914	A	Norwich	L	0–3		2,035

=== London Professional Charity Fund ===
Date	Venue	Opponent	Result	Score F–A	Scorers	Attendance
6 October 1913	H	Fulham	L	1–2*	Gregory	2,000

=== Ealing Hospital Cup (Final) ===
Date	Venue	Opponent	Result	Score F–A	Scorers	Attendance
27 April 1914	H	Brentford	W	2–1	Birch, Miller	500

=== FA Cup ===
Round	Date	Venue	Opponent	Result	Score F–A	Scorers	Attendance
Fifth round qualifying	13 December 1913			Bye			
First Round	10 January 1914	H	Bristol City (Second Division)	D	2–2	Miller, Birch	18,000
First Round Replay	14 January 1914	A	Bristol City (Second Division)	W	2–0	Birch, Gregory	13,781
Second Round	31 January 1914	A	Swansea Town (Southern League Division Two)	W	2–1	Birch 2	15,000
Third Round	21 February 1914	A	Birmingham (Second Division)	W	2–1	Gregory, Miller	33,000
Fourth Round	7 March 1914	A	Liverpool (First Division)	L	1–2	Mitchell 68' (pen) Birch Missed penalty	36,500

== Squad ==
Position	Nationality	Name	Southern League Appearances	Southern League Goals	FA Cup Appearances	FA Cup Goals
GK	(England)	F.W Matthews	2			
GK	(England)	Harry Jefferies	1			
GK	(England)	Bob McLeod				
GK	(England)	Alfred Nicholls	35		5	
DF	(England)	Billy Draper				
DF	(England)	Joe Wingrove	11			
DF	(England)	Harry Pullen	37	1	5	
DF	(England)	Joseph Wilde	1			
DF	(England)	Dan Higgins	17		4	
DF	(England)	Gilbert Ovens	32		5	
DF	(England)	Francis Weblin	3			
MF	(England)	John Pennifer	3			
MF	(England)	Jack Gregory	31	7	5	2
MF	(England)	Archie Mitchell	32	2	5	1
MF	(England)	John Baldock	3	1		
MF	(England)	Jack Broster	4			
MF	(England)	Alf Whyman	27	1	1	
MF	(England)	Bill Wake	28		5	
MF	(England)	Edward McKinney				
MF	(England)	Andy Thompson	1			
FW	(England)	David Donald				
FW	(England)	Jimmy Birch	30	15	5	4
FW	(England)	Billy Thompson	37	2	5	
FW	(England)	Ben Ives	30			
FW	(England)	Freddie Blake	2			
FW	(England)	John Miller	28	14	5	2
FW	(England)	Herbert Strugnell	11			
FW	(England)	William Gaul	4	1		
FW	(Republic of Ireland)	Jimmy Fortune	8		5	

== Transfers in ==
Name	from	Date	Fee
Billy Draper		cs1913	
Read, Albert *	Uxbridge	cs1913	
Saunders, John		cs1913	
Cater, William	Kilburn	cs1913	
Lockwood, James *	Ipswich Town	cs1913	
Matthews, F W *	Hampstead Town	cs1913	
John Pennifer	Hampstead Town	July1913	
Butler, Albert (Ben)	Hartlepools U	1 Sep 1913	
Stephenson, James	Luton	6 Sep 1913	
John Baldock	Luton Vandale	Nov1913	
Freddie Blake	Ilford	Jan1914	
Brightwell, W		Mar1914	
Lilliott, Frank		Mar1914	
Poplett, John *	Shepherd's Bush	May1914	
Browning, Bob	Brentford	May1914	
Bob McLeod	Newport	4 May 1914	
David Donald	Watford	16 May 1914	
Edward McKinney	Broom Athletic	16 May 1914	
Amstad, Jonas		June1914	
Bowler, George	Tottenham	cs1914	
Downing, Alfred		cs1914	
Nitschke, William *	Kilburn	cs1914	

== Transfers out ==
Name	from	Date	Fee	Date	To	Fee
Bruton, A C *	Kilburn	Mar1913		cs 13		
Scotchbrook, Ernest *		Feb1913		cs 13	Summerstown	
Barron, Harrie *	Shelbourne	Mar1913		cs 13		
Lincoln, A J *		Mar1913		cs 13		
Willcox, Frederick *		Mar1913		cs 13		
Day, Richard	Haslingden	7 Mar 1913		Aug 1913	Haslingden	
Jackman, Vincent *		Mar1911		Sep 1913	Croydon Common	
Sangster, James	Southall	1 May 1912		Sep 1913	Abertillery	Free
William Gaul	Shepherd's Bush	July1911		Mar 1914	London Caledonians	
Lockwood, James *	Ipswich Town	cs1913		Apr 1914	Ipswich Town	
Herbert Strugnell	Aston Villa	22 May 1913		May 1914	Hartlepools U	£125
Jimmy Fortune	Barrow	6 May 1913		May 1914	Bristol R	£100
Andy Thompson	Gateshead	3 June 1913		May 1914		
Stephenson, James	Luton	6 Sep 1913		cs 14	Bedlington United	
Harry Jefferies	Aberdare	30 June 1913		cs 14		
Saunders, John		cs1913		cs 14		
Cater, William	Kilburn	cs1913		cs 14		
Lilliott, Frank		Mar1914		cs 14		
Wilson, Thomas *	Clapton	18 July 1910		cs 14		
Ingham, James	Haslingden	16 June 1913		cs 14		
Brightwell, W		Mar1914		cs 14		
Thornton, Harry *	Shepherd's Bush	July1911		cs 14		
