= Frank Cannon =

Frank Cannon may refer to:

- Frank Cannon (footballer) (1888–1916), English footballer
- Frank J. Cannon (1859–1933), United States Senator from Utah
- Franklin Cannon (1794–1863), Lieutenant Governor of Missouri
- Frank Cannon (drag racer), American drag racer, early user of a front engine dragster
- Frank Cannon, fictional title character of the U.S. TV series Cannon
- Ardath Mayhar (1930–2012), American author who used the pseudonym Frank Cannon
