= Charles Ainsworth =

Charles Ainsworth may refer to:

- Charles Ainsworth (politician) (1874–1956), British businessman and politician
- Charles Ainsworth (footballer) (1885–1955), English footballer
