= Jim Rothwell =

English footballer

Personal information
- Date of birth: Q3 1883
- Place of birth: Crosby, England
- Date of death: Q3 1940 (aged 56–57)
- Place of death: West Derby, England
- Position: Full-back

Senior career*
Years	Team	Apps	(Gls)
- Litherland
1910–1917	West Ham United	87	(4)
- * Club domestic league appearances and goals

James Rothwell (1883–1940) was an English footballer who played as a full-back in the Southern League for West Ham United.

Rothwell was born in Crosby, Lancashire. He played for Litherland and had trials with Liverpool before joining Southern League First Division club West Ham United in 1910. He made his debut against Brentford in a 3–0 defeat on 13 December. His second outing saw West Ham beat Leyton by the same scoreline and he scored his first of four goals for the club in his fourth match, against Plymouth Argyle. He missed one match up to the end of the 1910–11 season and was part of the team that reached the fourth round of the FA Cup, beating Nottingham Forest, Preston North End and Manchester United along the way but eventually succumbing to Blackburn Rovers. He remained a regular in the team until the 1913–14 season, often partnering Frank Burton. He played his final match on 25 February 1914, against Liverpool, in an FA Cup third round replay at Anfield. In all, he totalled 98 games for West Ham in league and cup.

In December 1916, he returned to the club for two matches in the wartime London Combination, partnering his eventual replacement Billy Cope against Chelsea and Clapton Orient.

== Bibliography ==
- Hogg, Tony (2005). Who's Who of West Ham United. Profile Sports Media. ISBN 1-903135-50-8.
- Northcutt, John; Marsh, Steve (2015). West Ham United: The Complete Record. deCoubertin Books. ISBN 978-1-909245-27-3.
