= Potijze Château Wood Cemetery =

WWI CWGC cemetery in Ypres, Belgium

Potijze Château Wood
- Commonwealth War Graves Commission
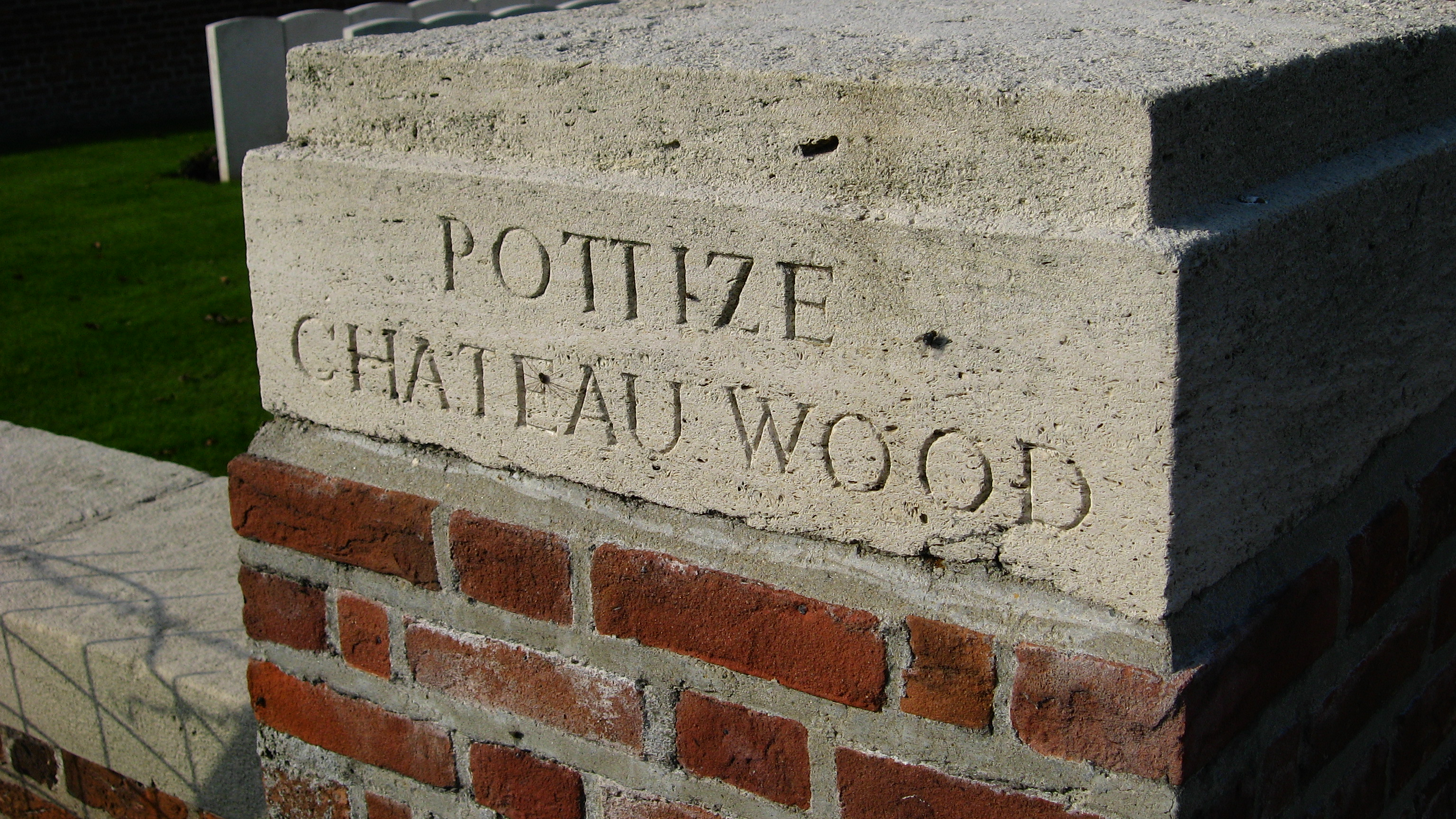
- Used for those deceased 1915–1918
- Established: 1915
- Location: 50°51′41″N 02°54′47″E near Ypres, West Flanders, Belgium
- Designed by: Sir Reginald Blomfield
- Total burials: 157
- Unknowns: 6

Burials by nation
- Allied Powers: United Kingdom 151; Canada 6

Burials by war
- World War I: 157
- Statistics source: WW1Cemeteries.com and CWGC

Potijze Château Wood Cemetery is a Commonwealth War Graves Commission (CWGC) burial ground for the dead of the First World War located in the Ypres Salient on the Western Front.

The cemetery grounds were assigned to the United Kingdom in perpetuity by King Albert I of Belgium in recognition of the sacrifices made by the British Empire in the defence and liberation of Belgium during the war.

== Foundation ==
The cemetery is one of four in and around the site of the former Potijze Château. The château was behind Allied lines for most of the war and served as an Advanced Dressing Station. The château was destroyed by German artillery fire.

The cemetery holds the bodies of 46 soldiers, from the Hampshire and Royal Inniskilling Fusiliers regiments, who were killed in August 1916 by poison gas.

The cemetery was designed by Sir Reginald Blomfield.

== See also ==
- Potijze Château Lawn and Grounds Commonwealth War Graves Commission Cemeteries
- Potijze Burial Ground Commonwealth War Graves Commission Cemetery
