= Potijze Château Lawn and Grounds Cemeteries =

WWI CWGC cemetery in Ypres, Belgium

- Commonwealth War Graves Commission
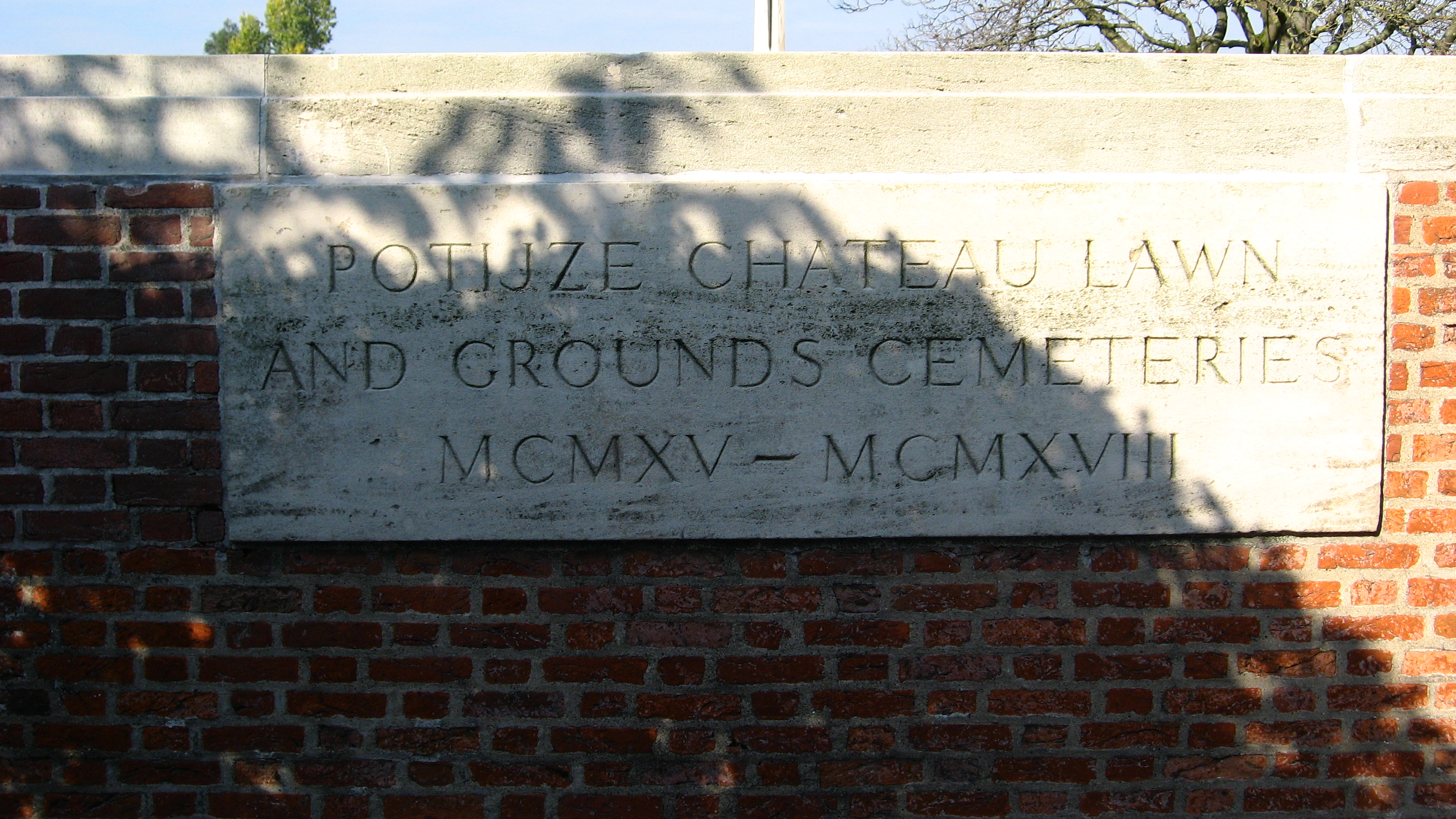
- Used for those deceased 1915–1918
- Established: 1915
- Location: 50°51′41.0″N 02°54′54.1″E near Ypres, West Flanders, Belgium
- Designed by: Sir Reginald Blomfield
- Total burials: 477 (Grounds) 229 (Lawn)
- Unknowns: 111 (Grounds)

Burials by nation
- Allied Powers: (Grounds/Lawn): United Kingdom 399/191; Australia 25/4; Canada 49/22; New Zealand 2/0; South Africa 1/9; Central Powers: (Grounds/Lawn): Germany: 1/3

Burials by war
- World War I: 706
- Statistics source: WW1Cemeteries.com and the CWGC

Potijze Château Lawn and Grounds Cemeteries are Commonwealth War Graves Commission (CWGC) burial grounds for the dead of the First World War located in the Ypres Salient on the Western Front.

The cemetery grounds were assigned to the United Kingdom in perpetuity by King Albert I of Belgium in recognition of the sacrifices made by the British Empire in the defence and liberation of Belgium during the war.

== Foundation ==
These adjoining cemeteries are two of four in and around the site of the former Potijze Château. The château was behind Allied lines for most of the war and served as an Advanced Dressing Station. The château was destroyed by German artillery fire.

The cemeteries were extended after the war by concentration of battlefield graves and small cemeteries from the north-east of Ypres.

The cemeteries were designed by Sir Reginald Blomfield.

== See also ==
- Potijze Burial Ground Commonwealth War Graves Commission Cemetery
- Potijze Château Wood Commonwealth War Graves Commission Cemetery
