= John Tosswill =

English footballer

Personal information
- Full name: John Speare Tosswill
- Date of birth: 6 August 1890
- Place of birth: Eastbourne, England
- Date of death: 28 September 1915 (aged 25)
- Place of death: Eastbourne, England
- Position: Inside right

Senior career*
Years	Team	Apps	(Gls)
1906–1907	Eastbourne		
1907–1908	Hastings & St Leonards United	4	(4)
1908–1909	Aberdare Town		
1909–1910	Tunbridge Wells Rangers		
1910–1911	Maidstone United		
1911–1912	Queens Park Rangers	3	(1)
1912–1913	Liverpool	11	(1)
1913	Southend United		
1913–1914	Coventry City	17	(1)
- * Club domestic league appearances and goals

John Speare Tosswill (6 August 1890 – 28 September 1915), sometimes known as Jack Tosswill, was an English professional footballer who played as an inside right in the Football League for Liverpool. His partial deafness "used to cause some curious happenings in football matches, for he was not able to hear the referee's signal and oftimes was seen to proceed to score goals while the crowd and other players were waiting to take a free kick!". Tosswill also played cricket for Eastbourne.

== Personal life ==
Tosswill was partially deaf. He enlisted as a corporal in the Royal Engineers soon after Britain's entry into the First World War in August 1914. Before he could serve overseas, an illness suffered while stationed in Southampton led to Tosswill returning to Eastbourne. He died on 28 September 1915, following an operation at Eastbourne Military Hospital. Tosswill was buried in Ocklynge Cemetery, Eastbourne.

== Career statistics ==
Appearances and goals by club, season and competition
Club	Season	League			FA Cup		Total	
Club	Season	Division	Apps	Goals	Apps	Goals	Apps	Goals
Queens Park Rangers	1911–12	Southern League First Division	3	1	—		3	1
Liverpool	1912–13	First Division	11	1	0	0	11	1
Coventry City	1913–14	Southern League Second Division	17	1	0	0	17	1
Career total			31	3	0	0	31	3
