= John McLean (footballer, born 1872) =

Scottish footballer

Personal information
- Date of birth: 22 May 1872
- Place of birth: Port Glasgow, Scotland
- Position: Defender

Senior career*
Years	Team	Apps	(Gls)
1890–1894	Greenock Volunteers		
1894–1897	Liverpool	26	(0)
1897–1898	Grimsby Town	30	(2)
1898–1902	Bristol City		
1902–1904	Bristol Rovers	29	(1)
1904–1906	Millwall		
1906–1909	Queens Park Rangers	73	(0)
- * Club domestic league appearances and goals

John McLean (born 22 May 1872) was a Scottish footballer who played as a defender for Liverpool in The Football League.

McLean signed for Liverpool from the Scottish junior ranks during the 1894–95 Football League season as reinforcement for their defence which was not performing well. He made his debut against Stoke in a 3–1 defeat, and made a further 20 appearances that season. He featured less in the following campaign as the only two positions he could play (right and left back) were occupied, so he made a total of eight more appearances for Liverpool before he left in 1897.

He thereafter moved around several clubs, mainly being used in the centre half position, firstly to Grimsby Town (where he was brought in as a replacement for Sandy Higgins), and later Bristol City, Bristol Rovers, Millwall and Queens Park Rangers, winning the 1907–08 Southern Football League title with the West Londoners and playing in the subsequent 1908 FA Charity Shield. (Note: In the source, his record has been merged with that of a later Liverpool player of the same name and position.)
