= Frank Cannon (footballer) =

English footballer

Personal information
- Full name: Frank Cannon
- Date of birth: 8 November 1888
- Place of birth: Ware, England
- Date of death: 15 February 1916 (aged 27)
- Place of death: Ypres Salient, Belgium
- Position: Inside right

Youth career
- 1900–1907: Hitchin Town

Senior career*
Years	Team	Apps	(Gls)
1907–1909	Queen's Park Rangers	27	(9)
1909–1910	West Ham United	3	(1)
1910–1911	New Brompton	23	(1)
1911–1913	Port Vale	48	(17)
- * Club domestic league appearances and goals

Frank Cannon (8 November 1888 – 15 February 1916) was an English footballer who played at inside-right. He played for Hitchin Town, Queen's Park Rangers, West Ham United, New Brompton, and Port Vale. He helped QPR to the Southern League title in 1907–08 and scored in the FA Charity Shield defeat in 1908. He later won the Staffordshire Senior Cup and Birmingham Senior Cup with Port Vale. He was killed in action during World War I at the age of 27.

== Career ==
Cannon began his career with his hometown club Hitchin Town at 15 whilst working for a firm of solicitors. Described as "a dashing player and good dribbler with a fine shot", he joined Southern League club Queen's Park Rangers in April 1907. He helped Rangers to win the league title in 1907–08.

He scored for QPR at Stamford Bridge in the first ever FA Charity Shield game in 1908. His goal cancelled out that of Manchester United's Billy Meredith, and took the game to a replay, which United won 4–0. QPR went on to finish 15th in 1908–09. He moved on to West Ham United for the 1909–10 season, but played just four competitive games, all in January 1901, with his only goal coming in a 5–0 win over Norwich City.

Cannon joined New Brompton for the 1910–11 season, before moving on to Port Vale of The Central League in July 1911. With 18 goals in the 1911–12 season he became the club's top scorer. He helped the Vale lift the Staffordshire Senior Cup in 1912 and the Birmingham Senior Cup in 1913, but lost form during the 1912–13 season and departed the Athletic Ground in the summer of 1913.

== World War I ==
Cannon signed up to fight in World War I and was transferred from the Bedfordshire Regiment to the 13th (Service) Battalion of the Essex Regiment, known as the West Ham Pals. He rose to the rank of sergeant major but was killed by shrapnel at Ypres on 15 February 1916. The report of his death in a local newspaper contained the following note from QM Sergeant L.P Martin:

"The 13th Essex had been in the trenches for sixteen days and were just about to be relieved. He was just ready to leave the trench when several shrapnel shells burst over him, wounding him and several others. Although his wound was rather serious – he was wounded in the back – it was quite thought he would get to England and recover, but I am sorry to say he died on his way to the dressing station about an hour after he was hit".

Buried at Potijze Burial Ground, he left behind a wife, Violet, and three children.

== Career statistics ==
Appearances and goals by club, season and competition
Club	Season	League			FA Cup		Other		Total	
Club	Season	Division	Apps	Goals	Apps	Goals	Apps	Goals	Apps	Goals
Queen's Park Rangers	1907–08	Southern League First Division	9	6	—		1 (Note: Appearance in FA Charity Shield.)	1	10	7
Queen's Park Rangers	1908–09	Southern League First Division	18	3	1	0	1	0	20	3
Queen's Park Rangers	Total		27	9	1	0	2	1	30	10
West Ham United	1909–10	Southern League First Division	3	1	1	0	—		4	1
New Brompton	1910–11	Southern League First Division	23	1	3	5	—		26	6
Port Vale	1911–12	Central League	30	13	0	0	8	5	38	18
Port Vale	1912–13	Central League	18	4	4	0	6	2	28	6
Port Vale	Total		48	17	4	0	14	7	66	24
Career total			101	28	9	5	16	8	126	41

== Honours ==
Queens Park Rangers

- Southern Football League: 1907–08
- FA Charity Shield runner-up: 1908

Port Vale

- Staffordshire Senior Cup: 1912
- Birmingham Senior Cup: 1913
