= Billy Law =

English footballer

Personal information
- Full name: William Law
- Date of birth: 1882
- Place of birth: Walsall, England
- Height: 5 ft 8 1/2 in (1.74 m)
- Position: Outside left

Youth career
- Rushall Olympic

Senior career*
| Years | Team | Apps | (Gls) |
- Walsall
- Scarborough
| 1904–1905 | Doncaster Rovers | 26 | (2) |
| 1905–1906 | West Bromwich Albion | | |
| 1906–1908 | Watford | 63 | (7) |
| 1908–1909 | Queens Park Rangers | | |
| 1909–1913 | Glossop | | |
- * Club domestic league appearances and goals

William Law (born 1882) was a professional footballer, born in Walsall. He played as an outside left for various English clubs, including in the Football League for Doncaster Rovers, West Bromwich Albion and Glossop, and the Southern League for Watford and Queens Park Rangers. Law played eleven first-team games for West Brom; the team did not lose any of them.
