= Evelyn Lintott =

English footballer (1883–1916)

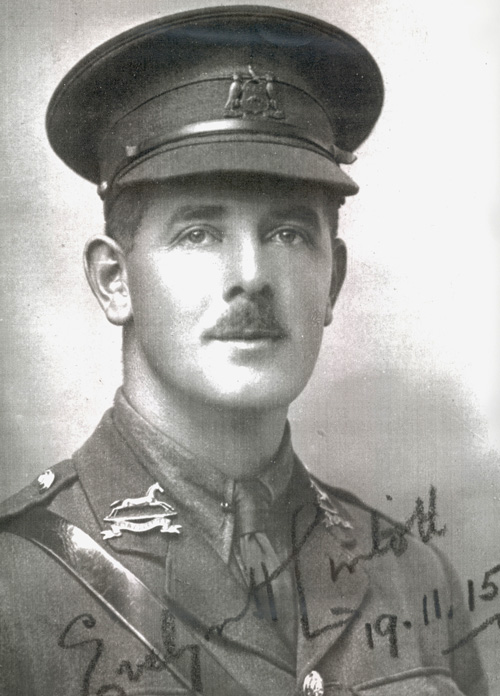
- Lintott in 1915, wearing his British Army uniform

Personal information
- Full name: Evelyn Henry Lintott
- Date of birth: 2 November 1883
- Place of birth: Godalming, Surrey, England
- Date of death: 1 July 1916 (aged 32)
- Place of death: Somme, Picardy, France
- Height: 5 ft 10 in (1.78 m)
- Position: Half back

Senior career*
Years	Team	Apps	(Gls)
1900–1908	Woking	74	(49)
1906–1907	Plymouth Argyle	2	(0)
1907–1908	Queens Park Rangers	32	(?)
1908–1912	Bradford City	53	(2)
1912–1913	Leeds City	43	(1)

International career
1907–1908	England Amateur	5	(0)
1908–1909	England	7	(0)
- * Club domestic league appearances and goals

Evelyn Henry Lintott (2 November 1883 – 1 July 1916) was an English footballer who joined the British Army and died during the First World War. He played as a half back for Plymouth Argyle and Queens Park Rangers in the Southern League, and Bradford City and Leeds City in the Football League. Lintott was capped seven times by the England national team after becoming a professional player, and he also made five appearances for the amateur side. He was killed in action on the first day on the Somme, the opening day of the Battle of Albert.

== Life and career ==
Lintott was born in Godalming, and educated at the Royal Grammar School, Guildford.

His first major club was Woking where he helped the club to win the East and West Surrey League and Surrey Charity Shield. He moved to Devon to study teaching at St Luke's College in Exeter, and signed with Southern League club Plymouth Argyle in 1906. He made two appearances for Argyle during the 1906–07 season and then settled in London, where he taught at Oldfield Road School in Willesden. He joined Queens Park Rangers in 1907, making his professional debut in the replay of the 1908 FA Charity Shield match and becoming Rangers' first ever England international in 1908. He played 31 Southern League games before moving to Football League side Bradford City in 1908. He finished his career at Leeds City. Lintott was a schoolmaster throughout his career. In 1908 his weight was 12 stone and height 5 ft 10 inches.

When World War I was declared in 1914, Lintott was one of the first players to sign up for army service and joined the West Yorkshire Regiment's 15th Battalion, known as the Leeds Pals. He was promoted to lieutenant and became the first professional footballer to hold a commission. He was killed in action on 1 July 1916, the first day on the Somme, which was the opening day of the Battle of Albert and the first phase of the British and French offensive that became known as the Battle of the Somme. Lintott lost his life along with more than 19,000 other men.
