= Charles Ainsworth (footballer) =

English footballer

Personal information
- Date of birth: 1885
- Place of birth: Ashbourne, Derbyshire, England
- Date of death: 1955 (aged 69–70)
- Position: Outside left

Senior career*
Years	Team	Apps	(Gls)
1907	Aston Villa		
1907-08	Queens Park Rangers	2	(2)
1908	Derby County	8	(0)
1909	Grimsby Town	3	(0)
- * Club domestic league appearances and goals

Charles Ainsworth (1885–1955) was a footballer who played in The Football League for Derby County and Grimsby Town. He also played for Queens Park Rangers.
