= Samuel Downing =

English footballer

Personal information
- Full name: Samuel Downing
- Date of birth: 19 January 1883
- Place of birth: Willesden, England
- Date of death: March 1974 (aged 91)
- Place of death: Cuckfield, England
- Position: Wing half

Senior career*
Years	Team	Apps	(Gls)
1898–1899	Willesden Green		
1899	Willesden Town		
1899	Park Royal		
1899–????	West Hampstead		
1903–1909	Queens Park Rangers	170	(13)
1909–1914	Chelsea	134	(9)
1914–1915	Croydon Common	23	(1)
- * Club domestic league appearances and goals

Samuel Downing (19 January 1883 – 1974) was an English footballer who played for a number of teams including Queens Park Rangers and Chelsea.

== Career ==
Downing's career started at Willesden Town, but spent time at Willesden Green and Park Royal football clubs before being transferred to West Hampstead. He moved to Queens Park Rangers in 1903 where he scored a hat-trick on his debut against Swindon Town.

He moved to Chelsea in April 1909, where he was part of the team that made it to the semi-final of the 1910–11 FA Cup and was promoted to the Football League First Division in 1911–12 when they finished second in the Second Division.

After retiring from professional football, he became a cricket coach.

== Honours ==
Chelsea

- Football League Second Division second-place promotion – 1911–12
