= Gilbert Ovens =

English footballer

Personal information
- Date of birth: 1884 or 1885
- Place of birth: Bristol, England
- Date of death: 17 March 1963 (aged 77–79)
- Place of death: Bristol, England
- Position: Full back

Senior career*
Years	Team	Apps	(Gls)
1904–1910	Bristol Rovers	66	(0)
1910–1911	Chelsea	0	(0)
1911-1915	Queens Park Rangers	88	(3)
- * Club domestic league appearances and goals

Gilbert Ovens (1884 or 1885 – 17 March 1963) was an English professional footballer who played in the Southern League for Bristol Rovers and Queens Park Rangers, as well as being on the books of Football League side Chelsea.

Ovens, who was born in Bristol, began his career with his home town club Bristol Rovers. He made a total of 66 appearances for them in the then-professional Southern League before being signed by Chelsea in 1910. He later returned to Southern League football with QPR.
