= Bob Browning =

English footballer (1888–1949)

Personal information
- Full name: Robert Ernest Browning
- Date of birth: 24 June 1888
- Place of birth: Kettering, England
- Date of death: 16 February 1949 (aged 60)
- Place of death: Bream, Gloucestershire, England
- Height: 5 ft 10 in (1.78 m)
- Position: Inside forward

Senior career*
Years	Team	Apps	(Gls)
1905–1910	Kettering Town		
1910–1913	Queens Park Rangers	54	(20)
1913	Southampton	6	(0)
1913–1914	Brentford	0	(0)
1921	Bream		
- * Club domestic league appearances and goals

Robert Ernest Browning (24 June 1888 – 16 February 1949) was an English professional footballer who played as an inside-forward for Queens Park Rangers and Southampton in the Southern League in the 1910s. He was nicknamed "Lightning".

== Football career ==
Browning was born in Kettering and played his early football for his home-town club before joining Queens Park Rangers in the 1910 close season, although he did not sign a full-time contract until 8 October that year. At Q.P.R., he was a regular scorer during his first season and was the club's top-scorer in the 1910–11 season with 18 goals. His scoring dropped off during his second season with the club, where he only scored once in 10 games played, in a draw against Watford on 22 January 1912. However, he would form part of the Q.P.R. team which won the Southern League during 1911–12. He did not play in Ranger's subsequent FA Charity Shield loss against Blackburn Rovers. The following season, he again scored only once for Rangers in twelve games.

In February 1913, his previous goalscoring form attracted him to fellow Southern League club, Southampton who were having difficulty filling the inside-left position, having used eight different players so far that season. Browning was immediately drafted into the first-team, making his Southampton debut at West Ham United on 15 February. Although match reports described him as "a clever forward with an accurate shot", Browning was unable to reproduce his previous goalscoring form and after six matches, with only one victory, he was dropped in favour of Bill Sanders, a soldier on loan from the Royal Artillery at Portsmouth.

In the summer of 1913, Browning was released and returned to West London to join Brentford, for whom he failed to make an appearance.

== Later career ==
During the First World War, Browning served in the Middlesex Regiment and later the Agricultural Labour Corps. He then settled in the Forest of Dean in Gloucestershire, where he worked as a coal-miner, playing as a permit player for Bream Amateurs.

== Honours ==
Queens Park Rangers

- Southern League First Division: 1911–12

== Bibliography ==
- Chalk, Gary; Holley, Duncan (1987). Saints – A complete record. Breedon Books. ISBN 0-907969-22-4.
- Chalk, Gary; Holley, Duncan; Bull, David (2013). All the Saints: A Complete Players' Who's Who of Southampton FC. Southampton: Hagiology Publishing. ISBN 978-0-9926-8640-6.
- Holley, Duncan; Chalk, Gary (1992). The Alphabet of the Saints. ACL & Polar Publishing. ISBN 0-9514862-3-3.
- Macey, Gordon (2009). Queens Park Rangers: The Complete Record. Derby, UK: Breedon. ISBN 978-1-85983-714-6.
