= 1907–08 Southern Football League =

The 1907–08 season was the 14th in the history of Southern Football League. Queens Park Rangers won Division One, whilst Bradford Park Avenue and Tottenham Hotspur were elected to the Football League. Southend United won Division Two and were promoted to Division One. At the end of the season all the reserve teams left Division Two.

== Division One ==
Southern Football League Division One
- Season: 1907–08
- Champions: Queens Park Rangers (1st title)
- Promoted: Tottenham Hotspur; Bradford Park Avenue
- Relegated: none
- Matches: 380
- Goals: 1,045 (2.75 per match)

A total of 20 teams contest the division, including 19 sides from previous season and one new team.

Newly elected teams:

- Bradford Park Avenue

Pos	Team	Pld	W	D	L	GF	GA	GR	Pts	Promotion
1	Queens Park Rangers	38	21	9	8	82	57	1.439	51	
2	Plymouth Argyle	38	19	11	8	50	31	1.613	49	
3	Millwall	38	19	8	11	49	32	1.531	46	
4	Crystal Palace	38	17	10	11	54	51	1.059	44	
5	Swindon Town	38	16	10	12	55	40	1.375	42	
6	Bristol Rovers	38	16	10	12	59	56	1.054	42	
7	Tottenham Hotspur	38	17	7	14	59	48	1.229	41	Elected to the Football League Second Division
8	Northampton Town	38	15	11	12	50	41	1.220	41	
9	Portsmouth	38	17	6	15	64	52	1.231	40	
10	West Ham United	38	15	10	13	47	48	0.979	40	
11	Southampton	38	16	6	16	51	60	0.850	38	
12	Reading	38	15	6	17	55	50	1.100	36	
13	Bradford Park Avenue	38	12	12	14	53	54	0.981	36	Elected to the Football League Second Division
14	Watford	38	12	10	16	47	59	0.797	34	
15	Norwich City	38	12	9	17	46	49	0.939	33	
16	Brentford	38	14	5	19	49	53	0.925	33	
17	Brighton & Hove Albion	38	12	8	18	46	59	0.780	32	
18	Luton Town	38	12	6	20	33	56	0.589	30	
19	Leyton	38	8	11	19	52	74	0.703	27	
20	New Brompton	38	9	7	22	44	75	0.587	25	

Rules for classification: The system of using goal average to separate two teams tied on points was used until the 1976-77 season. The points system: 2 points for a win, 1 point for a draw and 0 points for losing.

== Division Two ==
Southern Football League Division Two
- Season: 1907–08
- Champions: Southend United
- Promoted: Southend United
- Relegated: Portsmouth II; Southampton II; Tunbridge Wells Rangers; Swindon Town II; Brighton & Hove Albion II; Wycombe Wanderers (all resigned)
- Matches: 90
- Goals: 381 (4.23 per match)

A total of 10 teams contest the division, including 8 sides from previous season and two new teams, both of them are newly elected teams.

Newly elected teams:

- Croydon Common
- Brighton & Hove Albion II

Pos	Team	Pld	W	D	L	GF	GA	GR	Pts	Promotion or relegation
1	Southend United	18	13	3	2	47	16	2.938	29	Promoted to Division One
2	Portsmouth II	18	10	5	3	39	22	1.773	25	Left league at end of season
3	Croydon Common	18	10	3	5	35	25	1.400	23	
4	Hastings & St Leonards	18	10	2	6	43	29	1.483	22	
5	Southampton II	18	7	4	7	54	46	1.174	18	Left league at end of season
6	Tunbridge Wells Rangers	18	7	3	8	42	38	1.105	17	Left league at end of season
7	Salisbury City	18	6	4	8	35	46	0.761	16	
8	Swindon Town II	18	5	5	8	36	40	0.900	15	Left league at end of season
9	Brighton & Hove Albion II	18	4	4	10	34	47	0.723	12	Left league at end of season
10	Wycombe Wanderers	18	1	1	16	16	72	0.222	3	Left league at end of season

Rules for classification: The system of using goal average to separate two teams tied on points was used until the 1976-77 season. The points system: 2 points for a win, 1 point for a draw and 0 points for losing.

== Football League elections ==
Three Southern League clubs, Bradford Park Avenue, Queens Park Rangers and Tottenham Hotspur, applied for election to the Football League, although QPR later withdrew their application. Bradford PA were successful in the ballot, and replaced Lincoln City in the League. However, Stoke later resigned from the League, and a special meeting was arranged to elect a new member. Although at the meeting Stoke stated that they wished to remain in the League, a ballot was still held, in which Stoke and Tottenham won 20 votes (Rotherham County and Southport Central were also involved), after which the management committee voted 5-3 in favour of Tottenham.

Club	League	Votes
Grimsby Town	Football League	32
Chesterfield Town	Football League	23
Bradford Park Avenue	Southern League	20
Lincoln City	Football League	18
Tottenham Hotspur	Southern League	14
Burton United	Birmingham & District League	1
