= Joe Fidler =

English footballer

Personal information
- Full name: Joseph Edward Fidler
- Date of birth: 1885
- Place of birth: Sheffield, England
- Date of death: 1948 (aged 62–63)
- Height: 5 ft 10 in (1.78 m)
- Position: Full-back

Senior career*
Years	Team	Apps	(Gls)
- South Street New Connexion
1903–1905	Sheffield United	2	(0)
1905–1906	Fulham		
1906–1913	Queens Park Rangers	177	(0)
1913–1914	Woolwich Arsenal	25	(0)
1914–1915	Port Vale	5	(0)

International career
	Southern League XI	1	
- * Club domestic league appearances and goals

Joseph Edward Fidler (1885–1948) was an English professional football left back who played in the Football League for Woolwich Arsenal and Sheffield United.

== Playing career ==
Fidler joined Sheffield United from South Street New Connexion, and played one First Division game in both the 1903–04 and 1904–05 seasons. He moved on to Fulham and then Queens Park Rangers, spending six years at QPR. He joined Woolwich Arsenal in February 1913. He played 13 games as the club was relegated out of the First Division and into the Second Division at the end of the 1912–13 campaign. With Jack Peart out injured, he was partnered with Joe Shaw at full-back for the last 13 games of the 1912–13 season and first ten matches of the 1913–14 campaign, before he was dropped for England international Bob Benson. He joined Port Vale of the Central League in summer 1914, but was unable to establish himself in the first-team at the Old Recreation Ground.

== Military service ==
In January 1915, he enlisted in the 17th (Service) Battalion of the Duke of Cambridge's Own (Middlesex Regiment) to fight in World War I. Due to the number of footballers who were placed there it was nicknamed the Football Battalion.

== Career statistics ==
Appearances and goals by club, season and competition
Club	Season	League			FA Cup		Other		Total	
Club	Season	Division	Apps	Goals	Apps	Goals	Apps	Goals	Apps	Goals
Sheffield United	1903–04	First Division	1	0	0	0	—		1	0
Sheffield United	1904–05	First Division	1	0	0	0	—		1	0
Sheffield United	Total		2	0	0	0	—		2	0
Queens Park Rangers	1906–07	Southern League First Division	18	0	0	0	0	0	18	0
Queens Park Rangers	1907–08	Southern League First Division	33	0	2	0	1 (Note: Appearance in Southern Professional Charity Cup.)	0	36	0
Queens Park Rangers	1908–09	Southern League First Division	39	0	3	0	1 (Note: Appearance in London Challenge Cup.)	0	43	0
Queens Park Rangers	1909–10	Southern League First Division	39	0	7	0	5 (Note: 3 appearances in London Challenge Cup, 1 appearance in Southern Professional Charity Cup, 1 appearance in London Professional Charity Fund.)	0	51	0
Queens Park Rangers	1910–11	Southern League First Division	36	0	1	0	2 (Note: 1 appearance in Southern Professional Charity Cup, 1 appearance in London Challenge Cup.)	0	39	0
Queens Park Rangers	1911–12	Southern League First Division	7	0	0	0	1	0	8	0
Queens Park Rangers	1912–13	Southern League First Division	5	0	2	0	0	0	7	0
Queens Park Rangers	Total		177	0	15	0	10	0	202	0
Woolwich Arsenal	1912–13	First Division	13	0	—		—		13	0
Woolwich Arsenal	1913–14	Second Division	12	0	0	0	—		12	0
Woolwich Arsenal	Total		25	0	0	0	—		25	0
Port Vale	1914–15	Central League	5	0	0	0	—		5	0
Career total			209	0	15	0	10	0	234	0
