= John MacDonald (footballer, born 1883) =

Scottish footballer

Personal information
- Full name: John MacDonald
- Date of birth: 18 January 1883
- Place of birth: Ayr, Scotland
- Date of death: 1915 (aged 31–32)
- Position: Full-back

Senior career*
Years	Team	Apps	(Gls)
1901–1902	Arden Villa		
1902–1903	Ayr		
1903–1904	Blackburn Rovers	1	(0)
1905–1906	Leeds City	25	(0)
1906–1907	Grimsby Town	16	(0)
1907–1913	Queens Park Rangers	198	(0)
1913–191?	Mardy		
- * Club domestic league appearances and goals

John MacDonald (18 January 1883 – 1915) was a Scottish professional footballer who played as a full-back.
