= 1905–06 Manchester United F.C. season =

English football club season

Manchester United
1905–06 season
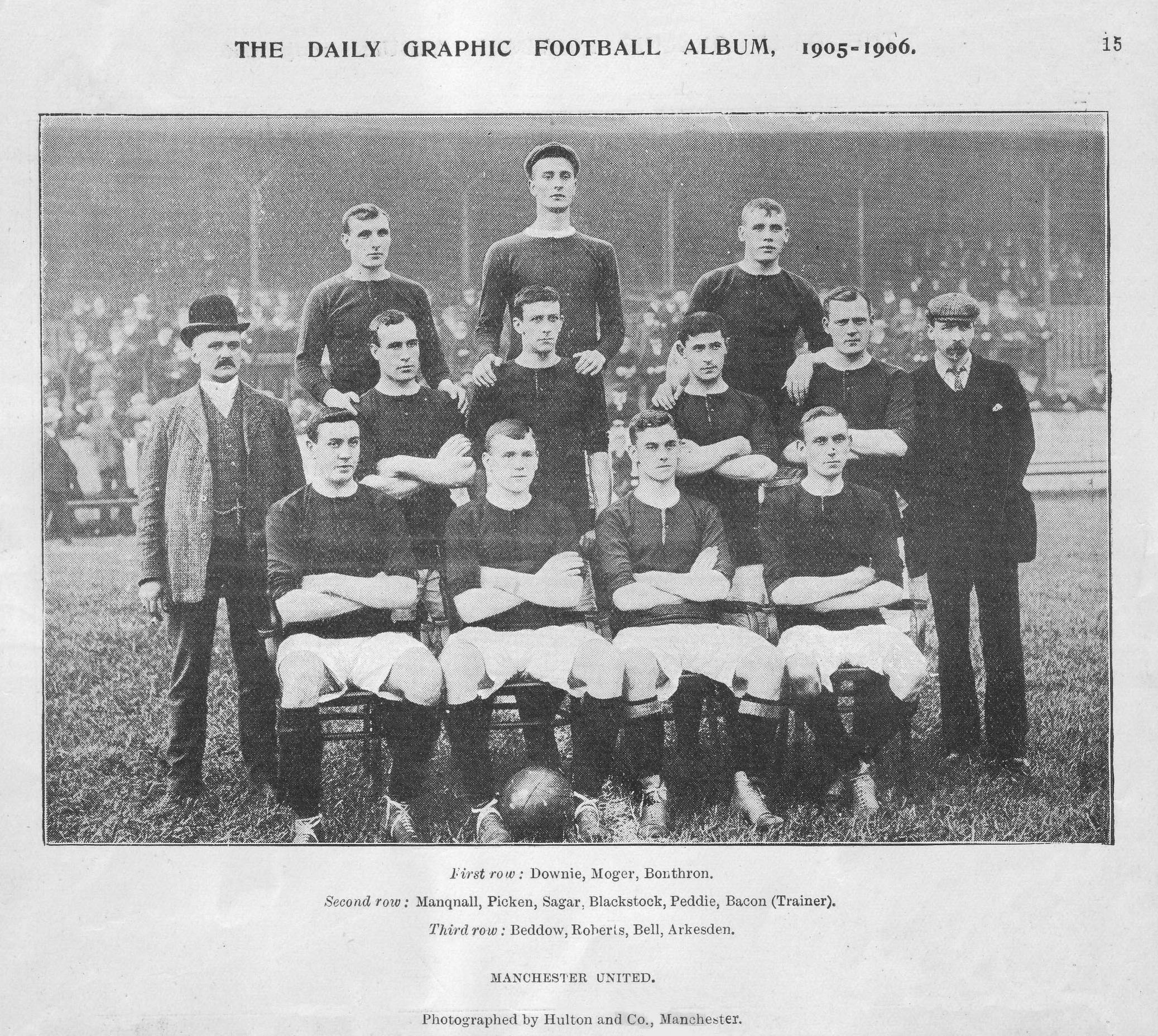
- The 1905–06 Manchester United team
- Chairman: John Henry Davies
- Manager: Ernest Mangnall
- Stadium: Bank Street Ground
- Second Division: 2nd
- FA Cup: Fourth round
- Top goalscorer: League: Jack Picken (20); All: Jack Picken (25)
- Highest home attendance: 35,500 vs Aston Villa (24 February 1906)
- Lowest home attendance: 6,000 vs Leeds City (15 January 1906)
- Average home league attendance: 16,242
Home colours	Away colours

The 1905–06 season was Manchester United's 14th season in the Football League. United finished second in the Second Division and gained promotion to the Football League First Division for the 1906–07 season. In the FA Cup, United reached the fourth round, where they were defeated by Woolwich Arsenal.

== Second Division ==
Date	Opponents	H / A	Result F–A	Scorers	Attendance
2 September 1905	Bristol City	H	5–1	Sagar (3), Beddow, Picken	25,000
4 September 1905	Blackpool	H	2–1	Peddie (2)	7,000
9 September 1905	Grimsby Town	A	1–0	Sagar	6,000
16 September 1905	Glossop	A	2–1	Bell, Beddow	7,000
23 September 1905	Stockport County	H	3–1	Peddie (2), Sagar	15,000
30 September 1905	Blackpool	A	1–0	Roberts	7,000
7 October 1905	Bradford City	H	0–0		17,000
14 October 1905	West Bromwich Albion	A	0–1		15,000
21 October 1905	Leicester Fosse	H	3–2	Peddie (2), Sagar	12,000
25 October 1905	Gainsborough Trinity	A	2–2	Bonthron (2)	4,000
28 October 1905	Hull City	A	1–0	Picken	14,000
4 November 1905	Lincoln City	H	2–1	Picken, Roberts	15,000
11 November 1905	Chesterfield	A	0–1		15,000
18 November 1905	Burslem Port Vale	H	3–0	Beddow, Peddie, own goal	8,000
25 November 1905	Barnsley	A	3–0	Beddow, Picken, own goal	3,000
2 December 1905	Clapton Orient	H	4–0	Peddie (2), Picken (2)	12,000
9 December 1905	Burnley	A	3–1	Beddow, Peddie, Picken	8,000
23 December 1905	Burton United	A	2–0	Schofield (2)	5,000
25 December 1905	Chelsea	H	0–0		35,000
30 December 1905	Bristol City	A	1–1	Roberts	18,000
6 January 1906	Grimsby Town	H	5–0	Beddow (3), Picken (2)	10,000
15 January 1906	Leeds City	H	0–3		6,000
20 January 1906	Glossop	H	5–2	Picken (2), Beddow, Peddie, Williams	7,000
27 January 1906	Stockport County	A	1–0	Peddie	15,000
10 February 1906	Bradford City	A	5–1	Beddow (2), Roberts, Schofield, Wombwell	8,000
17 February 1906	West Bromwich Albion	H	0–0		30,000
3 March 1906	Hull City	H	5–0	Picken (2), Peddie, Sagar, Schofield	30,000
17 March 1906	Chesterfield	H	4–1	Picken (3), Sagar	16,000
24 March 1906	Burslem Port Vale	A	0–1		3,000
29 March 1906	Leicester Fosse	A	5–2	Peddie (3), Picken, Sagar	5,000
31 March 1906	Barnsley	H	5–1	Sagar (3), Bell, Picken	15,000
7 April 1906	Clapton Orient	A	1–0	Wall	8,000
13 April 1906	Chelsea	A	1–1	Sagar	60,000
14 April 1906	Burnley	H	1–0	Sagar	12,000
16 April 1906	Gainsborough Trinity	H	2–0	Allan (2)	20,000
21 April 1906	Leeds City	A	3–1	Allan, Peddie, Wombwell	15,000
25 April 1906	Lincoln City	A	3–2	Allan (2), Wall	1,500
28 April 1906	Burton United	H	6–0	Sagar (2), Picken (2), Peddie, Wall	16,000

Pos	Team	Pld	W	D	L	GF	GA	GAv	Pts	Promotion
1	Bristol City (C, P)	38	30	6	2	83	28	2.964	66	Promotion to the First Division
2	Manchester United (P)	38	28	6	4	90	28	3.214	62	Promotion to the First Division
3	Chelsea	38	22	9	7	90	37	2.432	53	
4	West Bromwich Albion	38	22	8	8	79	36	2.194	52	
5	Hull City	38	19	6	13	67	54	1.241	44	

(C) Champions; (P) Promoted

== FA Cup ==
Manchester United entered the 1905–06 FA Cup at the first round proper stage and were drawn at home to Staple Hill on 13 January 1906. United dominated the match, winning 7–2 with a hat-trick from Clem Beddow and two goals from Jack Picken; Jack Allan and Harry Williams scored the other two goals. In the second round, United were drawn at home to Norwich City on 3 February 1906. Harry Moger kept the Canaries off the score sheet, while United saw goals from Alex Downie, Jack Peddie and Charlie Sagar. The Reds then faced Aston Villa at home in the third round stage on 24 February. 35,500 fans watched United defeat Villa 5–1 to reach the fourth round for the first time in their history; Picken scored a hat-trick for United, while Sagar scored two goals. United were drawn at home to Woolwich Arsenal in the fourth round. The match was played on 10 March, but goals by Peddie and Sagar would not be enough, as Arsenal advanced the next round with three goals of their own.

Date	Round	Opponents	H / A	Result F–A	Scorers	Attendance
13 January 1906	First round	Staple Hill	H	7–2	Beddow (3), Picken (2), Allan, Williams	7,560
3 February 1906	Second round	Norwich City	H	3–0	Downie, Peddie, Sagar	10,000
24 February 1906	Third round	Aston Villa	H	5–1	Picken (3), Sagar (2)	35,500
10 March 1906	Fourth round	Woolwich Arsenal	H	2–3	Peddie, Sagar	26,500

== Squad statistics ==
Pos.	Name	League		FA Cup		Total	
Pos.	Name	Apps	Goals	Apps	Goals	Apps	Goals
GK	(England) Harry Moger	27	0	4	0	31	0
GK	(England) Bob Valentine	8	0	0	0	8	0
GK	(Scotland) Archie Montgomery	3	0	0	0	3	0
FB	(Scotland) Tommy Blackstock	21	0	0	0	21	0
FB	(Wales) Horace Blew	1	0	0	0	1	0
FB	(Scotland) Bob Bonthron	26	2	4	0	30	2
FB	(England) Dick Holden	27	0	4	0	31	0
HB	(Scotland) Alex Bell	36	2	4	0	40	2
HB	(Scotland) Alex Downie	34	0	4	1	38	1
HB	(England) Dick Duckworth	10	0	0	0	10	0
HB	(England) Charlie Roberts (c)	34	4	4	0	38	4
FW	(England) Jack Allan	5	5	1	1	6	6
FW	(England) Tommy Arkesden	7	0	0	0	7	0
FW	(England) Clem Beddow	21	11	1	0	22	11
FW	(Northern Ireland) Bernard Donaghy	3	0	0	0	3	0
FW	(England) Jimmy Dyer	1	0	0	0	1	0
FW	(England) George Lyons	2	0	0	0	2	0
FW	(Scotland) Jack Peddie	34	18	3	2	37	20
FW	(Scotland) Jack Picken	33	20	4	5	37	25
FW	(Scotland) Alex Robertson	1	0	0	0	1	0
FW	(England) Charlie Sagar	20	16	3	4	23	20
FW	(England) Alf Schofield	23	4	4	0	27	4
FW	(England) George Wall	6	3	0	0	6	3
FW	(England) Harry Williams	10	1	2	1	12	2
FW	(England) Dick Wombwell	25	2	2	0	27	2
