= 1906–07 Manchester United F.C. season =

English football club season

Manchester United
1906–07 season
- Chairman: John Henry Davies
- Manager: Ernest Mangnall
- Stadium: Bank Street Ground
- First Division: 8th
- FA Cup: First Round
- Top goalscorer: League: George Wall (11); All: George Wall (13)
- Highest home attendance: 45,000 vs Bolton Wanderers (22 September 1906)
- Lowest home attendance: 8,000 vs Portsmouth (16 January 1907)
- Average home league attendance: 20,500
Home colours	Away colours

The 1906–07 season was Manchester United's 15th season in the Football League.

== First Division ==
Date	Opponents	H / A	Result F–A	Scorers	Attendance
1 September 1906	Bristol City	A	2–1	Roberts 10', Picken 31'	5,000
3 September 1906	Derby County	A	2–2	Schofield (2) 16', 34'	5,000
8 September 1906	Notts County	H	0–0		30,000
15 September 1906	Sheffield United	A	2–0	Downie 7', Bell 80'	12,000
22 September 1906	Bolton Wanderers	H	1–2	Peddie (??)	45,000
29 September 1906	Derby County	H	1–1	Bell 55'	25,000
6 October 1906	Stoke City	A	2–1	Duckworth (2) 44', 60'	7,000
13 October 1906	Blackburn Rovers	H	1–1	Wall 45'	20,000
20 October 1906	Sunderland	A	1–4	Peddie 80'	18,000
27 October 1906	Birmingham	H	2–1	Peddie (2) (??)	14,000
3 November 1906	Everton	A	0–3		20,000
10 November 1906	Woolwich Arsenal	H	1–0	Downie 49'	20,000
17 November 1906	The Wednesday	A	2–5	Menzies 85', Peddie 89'	7,000
24 November 1906	Bury	H	2–4	Peddie 8', Wall (??)	30,000
1 December 1906	Manchester City	A	0–3		40,000
8 December 1906	Middlesbrough	H	3–1	Wall (2) (??), Sagar (??)	12,000
15 December 1906	Preston North End	A	0–2		9,000
22 December 1906	Newcastle United	H	1–3	Menzies 17'	18,000
25 December 1906	Liverpool	H	0–0		20,000
26 December 1906	Aston Villa	A	0–2		20,000
29 December 1906	Bristol City	H	0–0		10,000
1 January 1907	Aston Villa	H	1–0	Turnbull 52'	40,000
5 January 1907	Notts County	A	0–3		10,000
19 January 1907	Sheffield United	H	2–0	Turnbull 20', Wall 30'	15,000
26 January 1907	Bolton Wanderers	A	1–0	Turnbull 81'	25,000
2 February 1907	Newcastle United	A	0–5		30,000
9 February 1907	Stoke City	H	4–1	Holford 14' (o.g.), Picken (2) 30', 42', Meredith 86'	15,000
16 February 1907	Blackburn Rovers	A	4–2	Meredith (2) (??), Sagar (??), Wall (??)	5,000
23 February 1907	Preston North End	H	3–0	Sagar 4', Wall (2) 19' (pen.)	16,000
2 March 1907	Birmingham	A	1–1	Menzies 42'	20,000
16 March 1907	Woolwich Arsenal	A	0–4		6,000
25 March 1907	Sunderland	H	2–0	Williams 11', Turnbull 50'	12,000
30 March 1907	Bury	A	2–1	Meredith 50', Menzies 55'	25,000
1 April 1907	Liverpool	A	1–0	Turnbull 43'	20,000
6 April 1907	Manchester City	H	1–1	Roberts 75'	40,000
10 April 1907	The Wednesday	H	5–0	Wall (3) 2', 30' (pen.), Picken 7', Sagar (??)	10,000
13 April 1907	Middlesbrough	A	0–2		15,000
22 April 1907	Everton	H	3–0	Bannister 12', Meredith (??), Turnbull (??)	10,000

Pos	Team	Pld	W	D	L	GF	GA	GAv	Pts
6	Bolton Wanderers	38	18	8	12	59	47	1.255	44
7	Woolwich Arsenal	38	20	4	14	66	59	1.119	44
8	Manchester United	38	17	8	13	53	56	0.946	42
9	Birmingham	38	15	8	15	52	52	1.000	38
10	Sunderland	38	14	9	15	65	66	0.985	37

Source: World Football
Rules for classification: 1) Points; 2) Goal average; 3) Goals scored

== FA Cup ==
Date	Round	Opponents	H / A	Result F–A	Scorers	Attendance
12 January 1907	First Round	Portsmouth	A	2–2	Picken 2', Wall 20'	24,329
16 January 1907	First Round; Replay	Portsmouth	H	1–2	Wall 34'	8,000

== Squad statistics ==
Pos.	Name	League		FA Cup		Total	
Pos.	Name	Apps	Goals	Apps	Goals	Apps	Goals
GK	(England) Harry Moger	38	0	2	0	40	0
FB	(Scotland) Tommy Blackstock	3	0	1	0	4	0
FB	(Scotland) Bob Bonthron	28	0	1	0	29	0
FB	(England) Herbert Burgess	17	0	0	0	17	0
FB	(England) Dick Holden	27	0	2	0	29	0
HB	(Scotland) Alex Bell	35	2	2	0	37	2
HB	(England) Frank Buckley	3	0	0	0	3	0
HB	(Scotland) Alex Downie	19	2	1	0	20	2
HB	(England) Dick Duckworth	28	2	2	0	30	2
HB	(England) Charlie Roberts (c)	31	2	1	0	32	2
HB	(Scotland) Arthur Young	2	0	0	0	2	0
FW	(England) Jack Allan	3	0	0	0	3	0
FW	(England) Jimmy Bannister	4	1	0	0	4	1
FW	(England) Clem Beddow	3	0	0	0	3	0
FW	(England) Bill Berry	9	0	0	0	9	0
FW	(Scotland) Alex Menzies	17	4	2	0	19	4
FW	(Wales) Billy Meredith	16	5	2	0	18	5
FW	(Scotland) Jack Peddie	16	6	0	0	16	6
FW	(Scotland) Jack Picken	26	4	2	1	28	5
FW	(England) Charlie Sagar	10	4	0	0	10	4
FW	(England) Alf Schofield	10	2	0	0	10	2
FW	(Scotland) Sandy Turnbull	15	6	0	0	15	6
FW	(England) George Wall	38	11	2	2	40	13
FW	(England) Joe Williams	3	1	0	0	3	1
FW	(England) Dick Wombwell	14	0	2	0	0	0
FW	(England) William Yates	3	0	0	0	3	0
