= 1903–04 Manchester United F.C. season =

English football club season

Manchester United
1903–04 season
- Chairman: John Henry Davies
- Manager: Ernest Mangnall
- Stadium: Bank Street Ground
- Second Division: 3rd
- FA Cup: Second Round
- Top goalscorer: League: Tommy Arkesden (11); Billy Grassam (11); Billy Griffiths (11); All: Tommy Arkesden (15)
- Highest home attendance: 40,000 vs Bristol City (5 September 1903); 40,000 vs Woolwich Arsenal (30 January 1904)
- Lowest home attendance: 6,000 vs Gainsborough Trinity (19 December 1903)
- Average home league attendance: 16,737
Home colours	Away colours

The 1903–04 season was Manchester United's 12th season in the Football League.

== Second Division ==
Date	Opponents	H / A	Result F–A	Scorers	Attendance
5 September 1903	Bristol City	H	2–2	Griffiths (2)	40,000
7 September 1903	Burnley	A	0–2		5,000
12 September 1903	Burslem Port Vale	A	0–1		3,000
19 September 1903	Glossop	H	5–0	Griffiths (2), Arkesden, Downie, A. Robertson	3,000
26 September 1903	Bradford City	H	3–1	Pegg (3)	30,000
3 October 1903	Woolwich Arsenal	A	0–4		20,000
10 October 1903	Barnsley	H	4–0	Pegg (2), Griffiths, A. Robertson	20,000
17 October 1903	Lincoln City	A	0–0		5,000
24 October 1903	Stockport County	H	3–1	Arkesden, Grassam, Schofield	15,000
7 November 1903	Bolton Wanderers	H	0–0		30,000
21 November 1903	Preston North End	H	0–2		15,000
19 December 1903	Gainsborough Trinity	H	4–2	Arkesden, Duckworth, Grassam, A. Robertson	6,000
25 December 1903	Chesterfield	H	3–1	Arkesden (2), A. Robertson	15,000
26 December 1903	Burton United	A	2–2	Arkesden (2)	4,000
2 January 1904	Bristol City	A	1–1	Griffiths	8,000
9 January 1904	Burslem Port Vale	H	2–0	Arkesden, Grassam	10,000
16 January 1904	Glossop	H	3–1	Arkesden (2), Downie	10,000
23 January 1904	Bradford City	A	3–3	Griffiths (2), Downie	12,000
30 January 1904	Woolwich Arsenal	H	1–0	A. Robertson	40,000
13 February 1904	Lincoln City	H	2–0	Downie, Griffiths	8,000
9 March 1904	Blackpool	A	1–2	Grassam	3,000
12 March 1904	Burnley	H	3–1	Grassam (2), Griffiths	14,000
19 March 1904	Preston North End	A	1–1	Arkesden	7,000
26 March 1904	Grimsby Town	H	2–0	A. Robertson (2)	12,000
28 March 1904	Stockport County	A	3–0	Hall, Pegg, Schofield	2,500
1 April 1904	Chesterfield	A	2–0	Bell, Hall	5,000
2 April 1904	Leicester Fosse	A	1–0	McCartney	4,000
5 April 1904	Barnsley	A	2–0	Grassam, Schofield	5,000
9 April 1904	Blackpool	H	3–1	Grassam (2), Schofield	10,000
12 April 1904	Grimsby Town	A	1–3	Grassam	8,000
16 April 1904	Gainsborough Trinity	A	1–0	A. Robertson	4,000
23 April 1904	Burton United	H	2–0	Grassam, A. Robertson	8,000
25 April 1904	Bolton Wanderers	A	0–0		10,000
30 April 1904	Leicester Fosse	H	5–2	Schofield (2), Bonthron, Griffiths, A. Robertson	7,000

Pos	Team	Pld	W	D	L	GF	GA	GAv	Pts	Promotion or relegation
1	Preston North End (C, P)	34	20	10	4	62	24	2.583	50	Promotion to the First Division
2	Woolwich Arsenal (P)	34	21	7	6	91	22	4.136	49	Promotion to the First Division
3	Manchester United	34	20	8	6	65	33	1.970	48	
4	Bristol City	34	18	6	10	73	41	1.780	42	
5	Burnley	34	15	9	10	50	55	0.909	39	

(C) Champions; (P) Promoted

== FA Cup ==
Date	Round	Opponents	H / A	Result F–A	Scorers	Attendance
12 December 1903	Intermediate Round	Small Heath	H	1–1	Schofield	10,000
16 December 1903	Intermediate Round; Replay	Small Heath	A	1–1	Arkesden	5,000
21 December 1903	Intermediate Round; 2nd Replay	Small Heath	Bramall Lane	1–1	Schofield	3,000
11 January 1904	Intermediate Round; 3rd Replay	Small Heath	Hyde Road	3–1	Arkesden (2), Grassam	9,372
6 February 1904	Round 1	Notts County	A	3–3	Arkseden, Downie, Schofield	12,000
10 February 1904	Round 1 Replay	Notts County	H	2–1	Morrison, Pegg	18,000
20 February 1904	Round 2	The Wednesday	A	0–6		22,051

== Squad statistics ==
Pos.	Name	Second Division		FA Cup		Total	
Pos.	Name	Apps	Goals	Apps	Goals	Apps	Goals
GK	(England) Harry Moger	13	0	0	0	13	0
GK	(England) John Willie Sutcliffe	21	0	7	0	28	0
FB	(Scotland) Tommy Blackstock	7	0	3	0	10	0
FB	(Scotland) Bob Bonthron	33	1	7	0	40	1
FB	(England) Vince Hayes	21	0	3	0	24	0
FB	(England) Bert Read	8	0	1	0	9	0
HB	(Scotland) Alex Bell	6	1	0	0	6	1
HB	(England) Walter Cartwright	9	0	6	0	15	0
HB	(Scotland) Alex Downie	29	4	6	1	35	5
HB	(England) Dick Duckworth	1	1	0	0	1	1
HB	(England) Billy Griffiths	30	11	7	0	37	11
HB	(England) Charlie Roberts	2	0	0	0	2	0
HB	(Scotland) Alex Robertson	27	10	5	0	32	10
FW	(England) Tommy Arkesden	26	11	6	4	32	15
FW	(England) Ralph Gaudie	7	0	1	0	8	0
FW	(Scotland) Billy Grassam	23	11	5	1	28	12
FW	(England) Proctor Hall	8	2	0	0	8	2
FW	(England) William Hartwell	1	0	0	0	1	0
FW	(Scotland) Hugh Kerr	2	0	0	0	2	0
FW	(England) George Lyons	2	0	0	0	2	0
FW	(Scotland) William McCartney	13	1	0	0	13	1
FW	(Ireland) Tommy Morrison	9	0	7	1	16	1
FW	(England) Dick Pegg	13	6	3	1	16	7
FW	(Scotland) Sandy Robertson	24	0	2	0	26	0
FW	(Scotland) Tom Robertson	3	0	0	0	3	0
FW	(England) Alf Schofield	26	6	7	3	33	9
FW	(England) Joseph Schofield	2	0	0	0	2	0
FW	(England) Harry Wilkinson	8	0	1	0	9	0
