= List of Manchester United F.C. players (100+ appearances) =

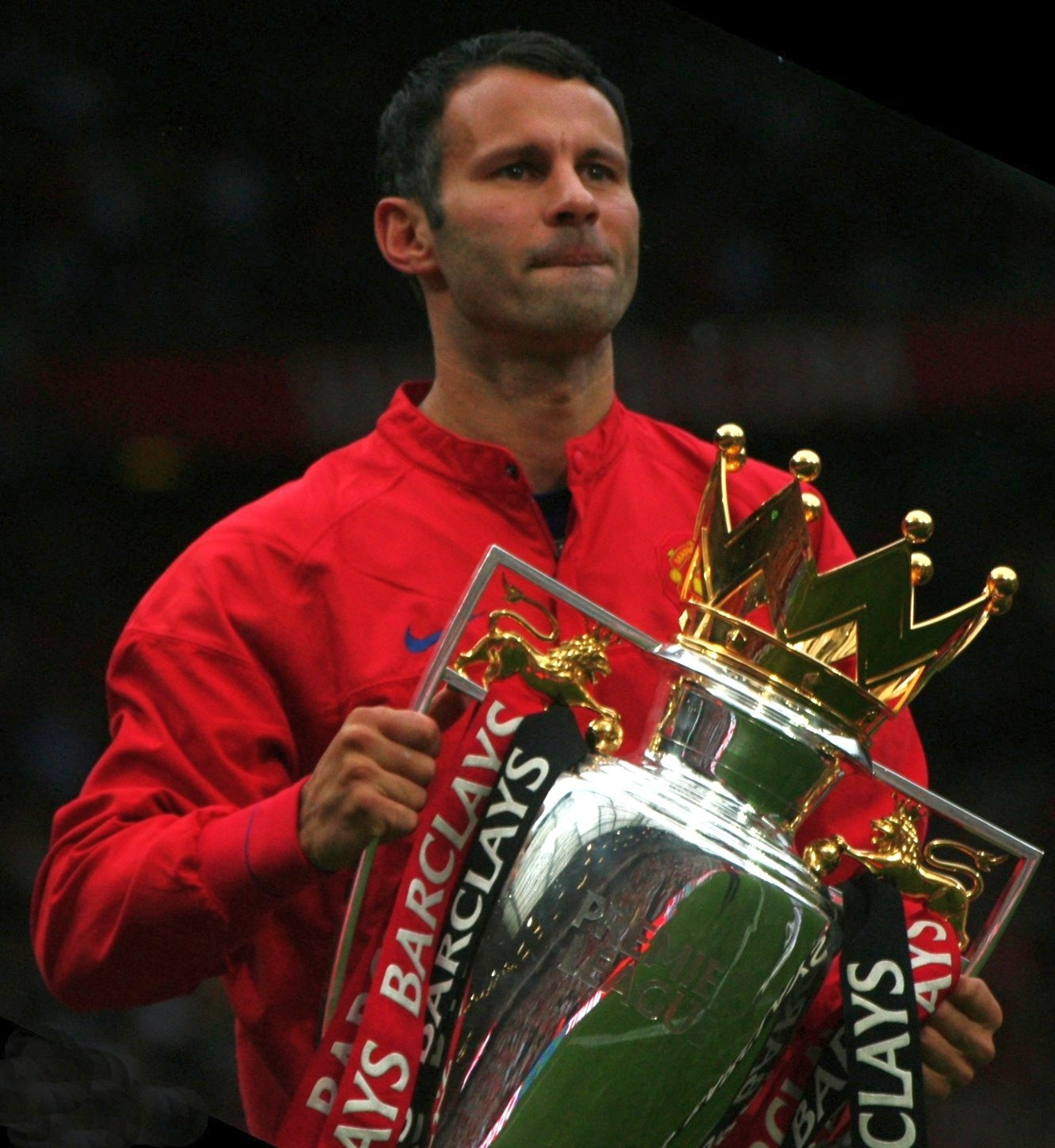
Ryan Giggs is Manchester United's most-capped player of all time, making 963 appearances in 23 years for the club. He later served as caretaker manager for the club in 2014.

Manchester United Football Club is an English professional association football club based in Old Trafford, Greater Manchester. The club was formed in Newton Heath in 1878 as Newton Heath LYR F.C., and played their first competitive match in October 1886, when they entered the First Round of the 1886–87 FA Cup. The club was renamed Manchester United F.C. in 1902, and they moved to Old Trafford in 1910. The club won its first significant trophy in 1908, the First Division title. Since then, the club has won a further 19 league titles, along with 13 FA Cups and six League Cups, among many other honours. They have also been crowned champions of Europe on three occasions by winning the European Cup. The club was one of 22 teams in the Premier League when it was formed in 1992. They experienced the most successful period in their history under the management of Alex Ferguson, who guided the team to 13 league titles in 21 years.

Since the club's first competitive match, 989 players have made a competitive first-team appearance for the club, of whom 229 players have made at least 100 appearances (including substitute appearances). Manchester United's record appearance-maker is Ryan Giggs, who made a total of 963 appearances over a 23-year playing career; he broke Bobby Charlton's previous appearance record in the 2008 UEFA Champions League final. Giggs also holds the record for the most starts (802 matches), and for the most matches played as a substitute (161).

Charlton was also the club's top goalscorer with 249 goals in his 17 years with the club. He held the mark for 45 years, until his record was overtaken by Wayne Rooney, who scored his 250th goal during the 2016–17 season; Rooney finished his 13-year tenure with Manchester United with 253 goals in 559 appearances. Other than Charlton, Giggs, and Rooney, only eight players have made more than 500 appearances for the club, including three members of the 1968 European Cup–winning team (Tony Dunne, Alex Stepney, and Bill Foulkes as well as Charlton) and three members of the 1999 Treble-winning team (Denis Irwin, Gary Neville and Paul Scholes, as well as Giggs); the two other players to reach 500 appearances are Joe Spence, who played for the club during the interwar period, and David de Gea, who played for the club from 2011 to 2023. De Gea, who is Spanish, is the first 500 Club member from outside of the United Kingdom and Ireland. Other than Charlton and Rooney, only two players (Denis Law and Jack Rowley) have scored more than 200 goals for the club.

The most recent player to reach 100 appearances for the club is Ivorian winger Amad Diallo, who reached the milestone on 18 October 2026.

== List of players ==
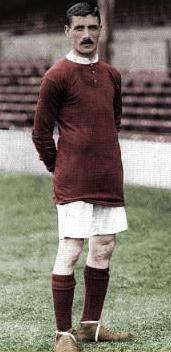
Billy Meredith made 335 appearances for Manchester United and is considered one of football's first superstars.

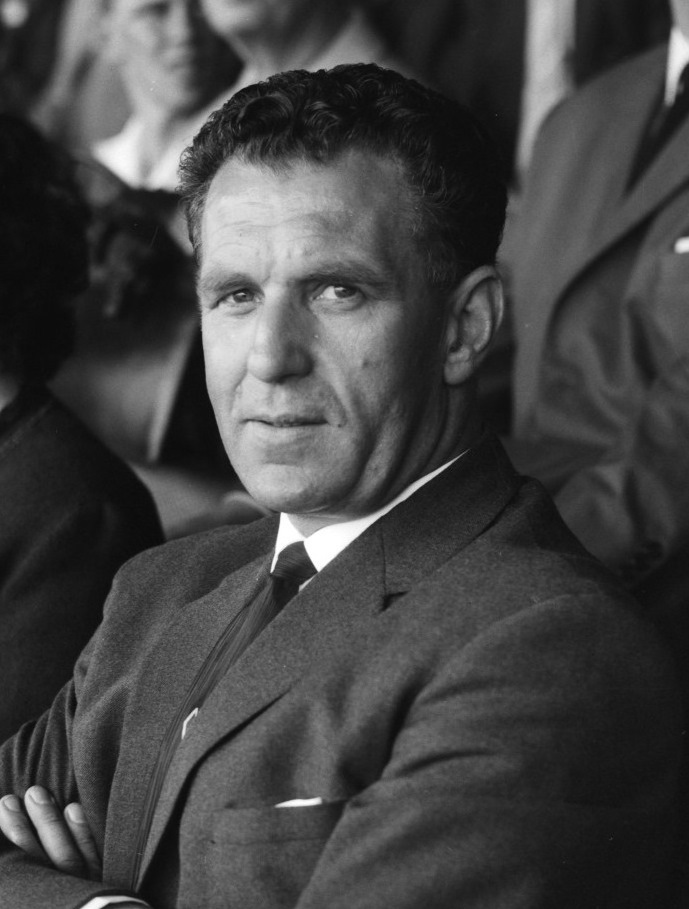
Jack Rowley made 424 appearances for Manchester United and was the first of only four players to score 200 goals for the club.

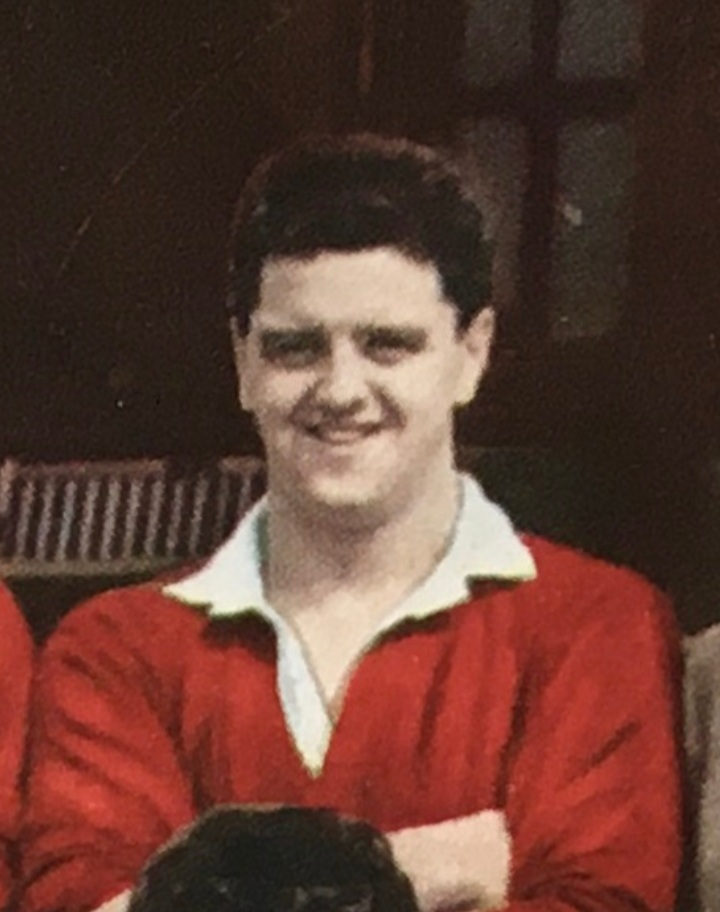
Tommy Taylor scored 131 goals in just 161 appearances for Manchester United. He was one of eight players to be killed in the Munich air disaster.

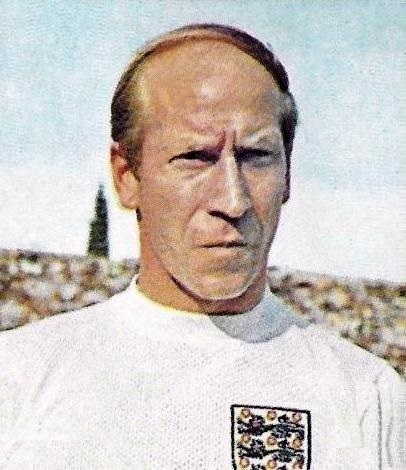
Bobby Charlton is United's second-highest goalscorer and has the second-most appearances for the club. He captained the club from 1968 to 1973.

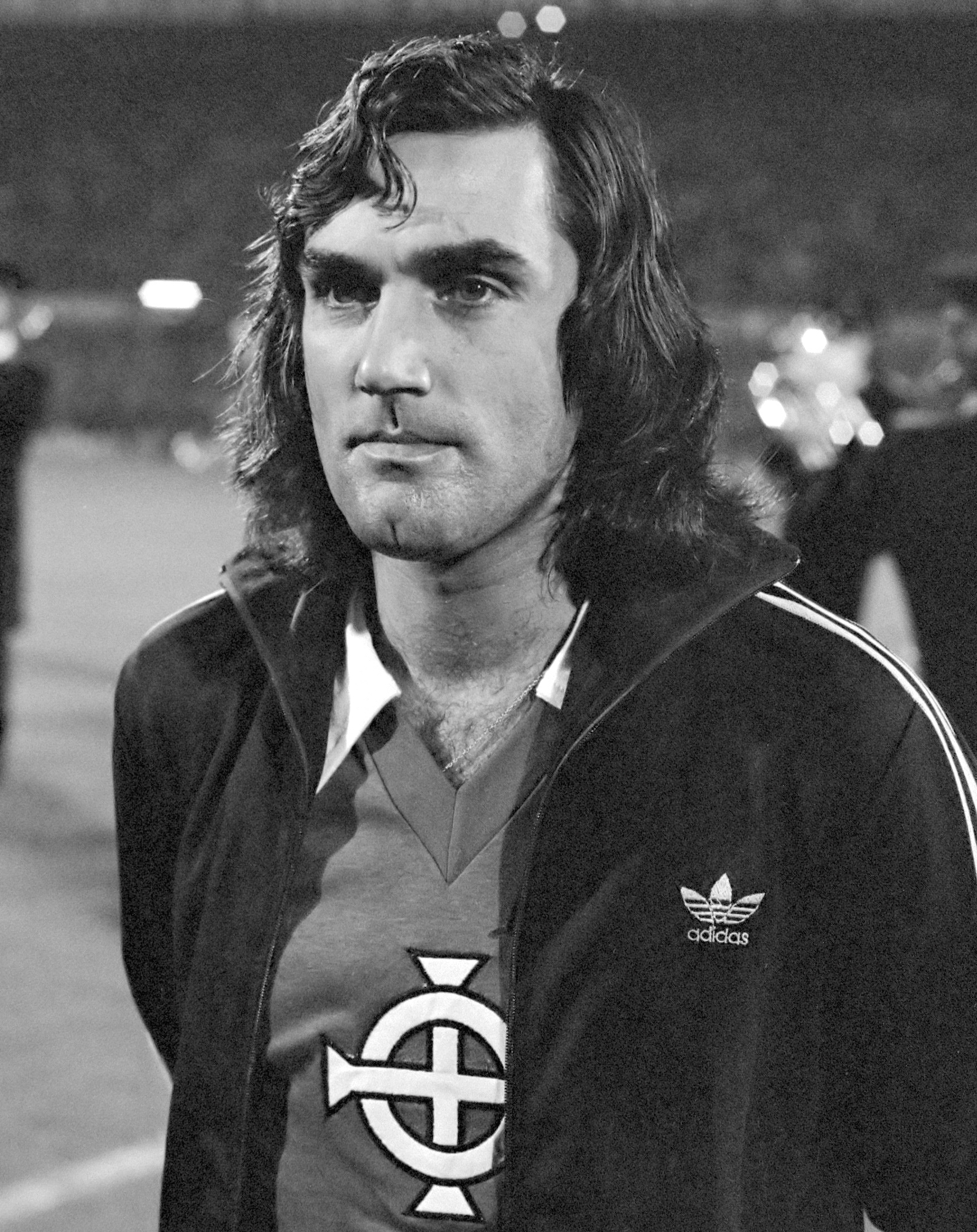
George Best made 470 appearances for United, and is considered one of the greatest footballers of all time.

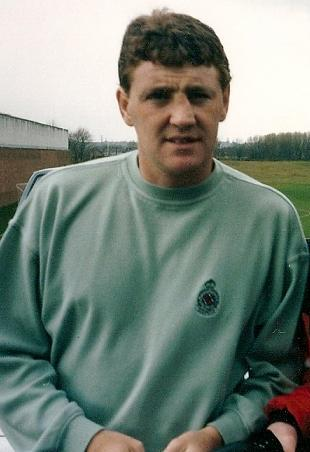
Steve Bruce made 414 appearances for Manchester United.

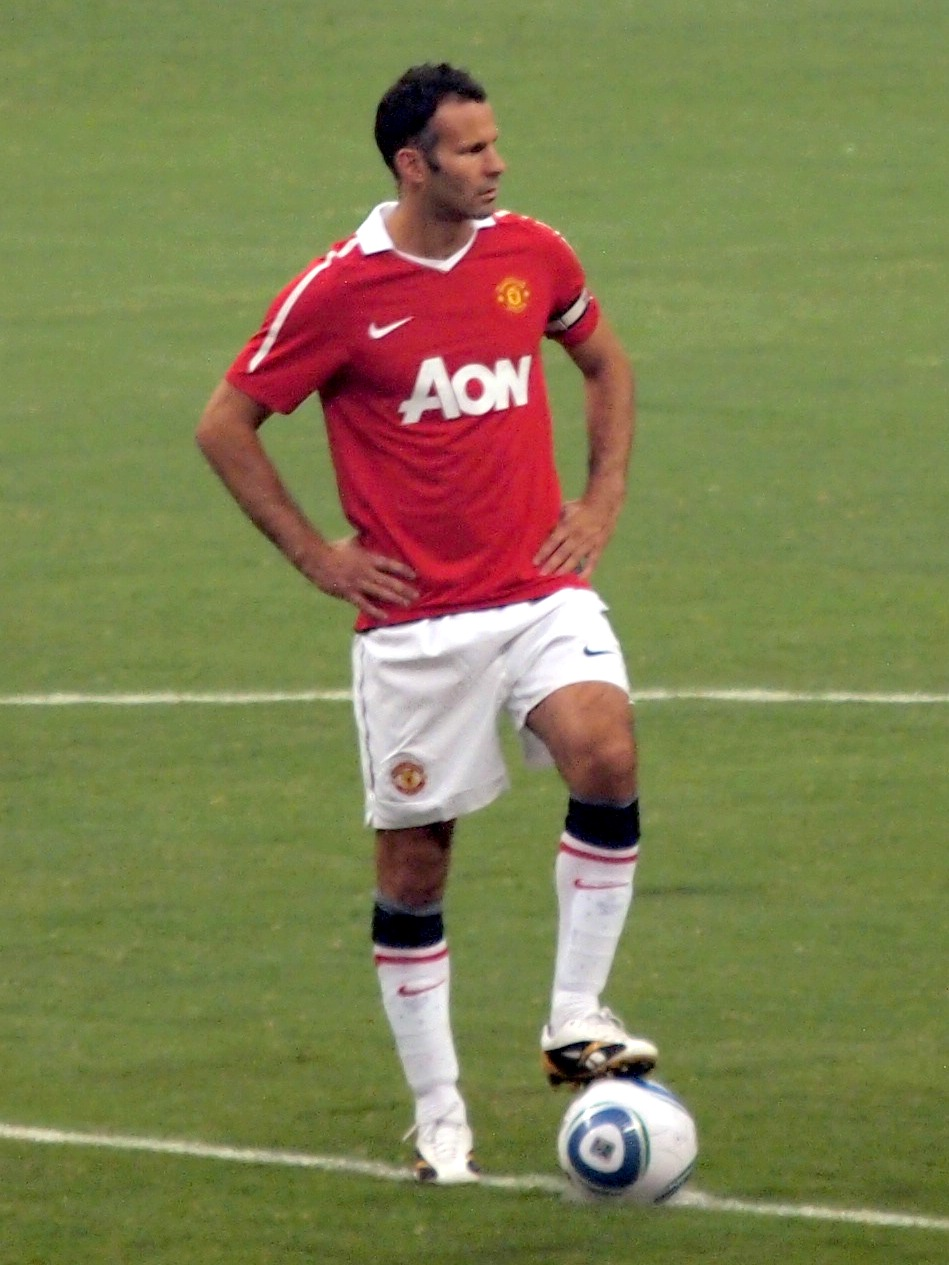
Ryan Giggs made 963 appearances for Manchester United, the most out of any player.

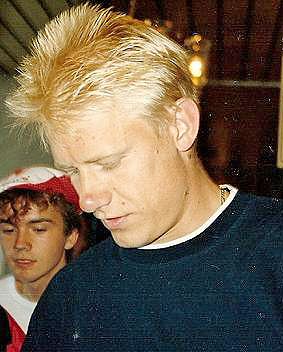
Peter Schmeichel made 398 appearances for Manchester United.

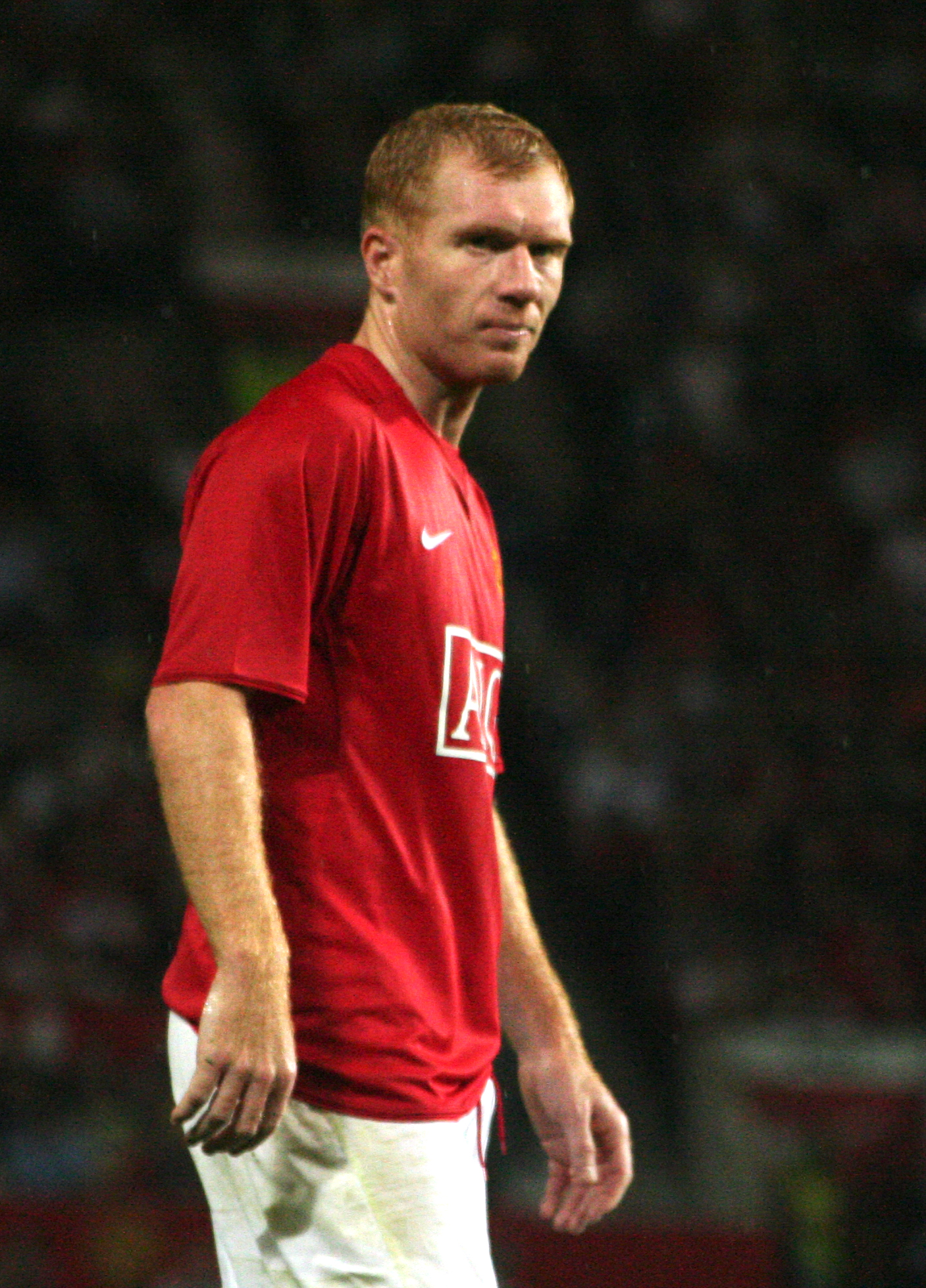
Paul Scholes made the third-most appearances for Manchester United with 718.

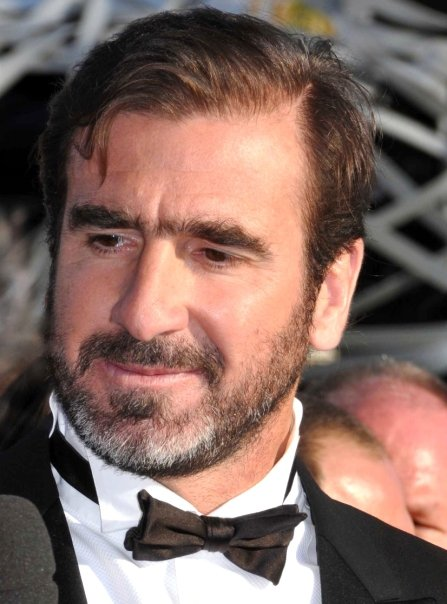
Eric Cantona made 185 appearances and scored 87 goals for Manchester United. He was the club's first captain from outside the British Isles.

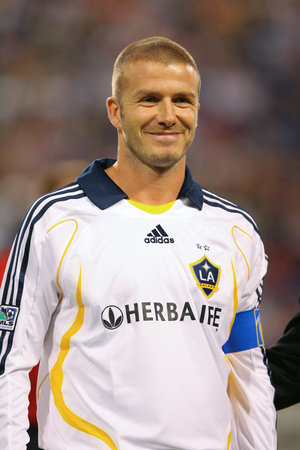
David Beckham made 394 appearances and scored 85 goals for Manchester United.

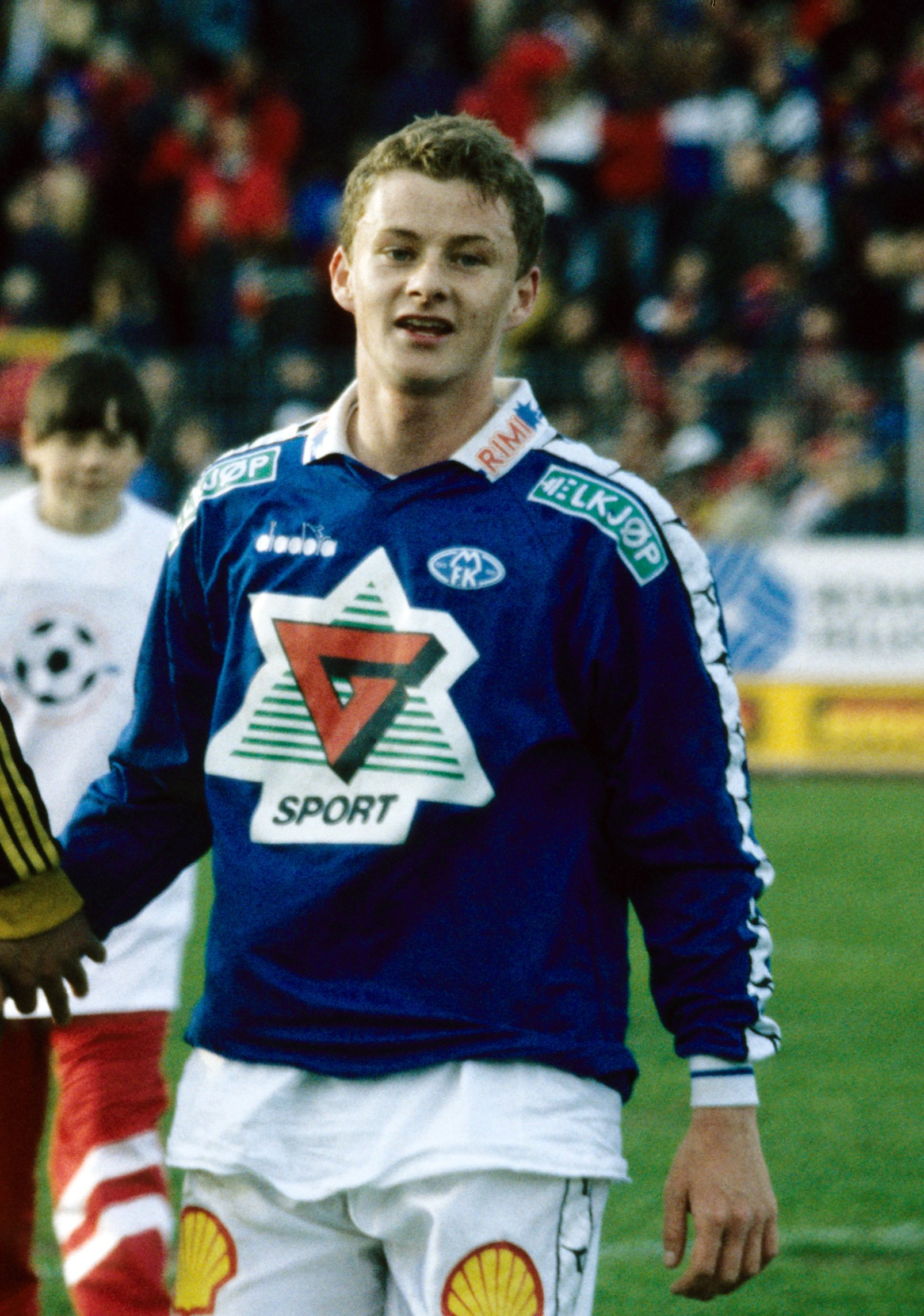
Ole Gunnar Solskjær made 366 appearances for the club, and managed it from 2018 to 2021.

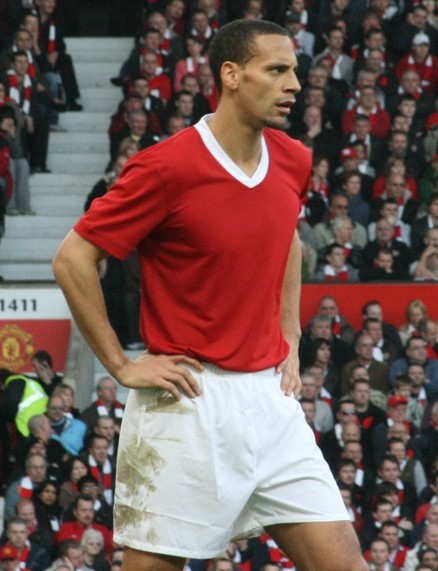
Rio Ferdinand made 455 appearances in 12 seasons with Manchester United.

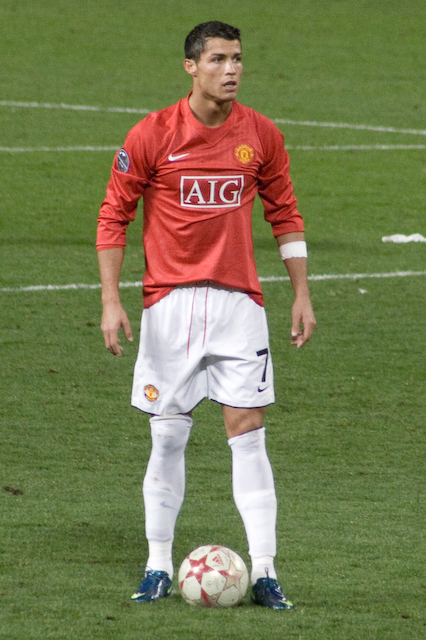
Cristiano Ronaldo made 346 appearances in two spells at Manchester United, winning the Ballon d'Or in 2008, as well as becoming the only United player to date to win the European Golden Boot.

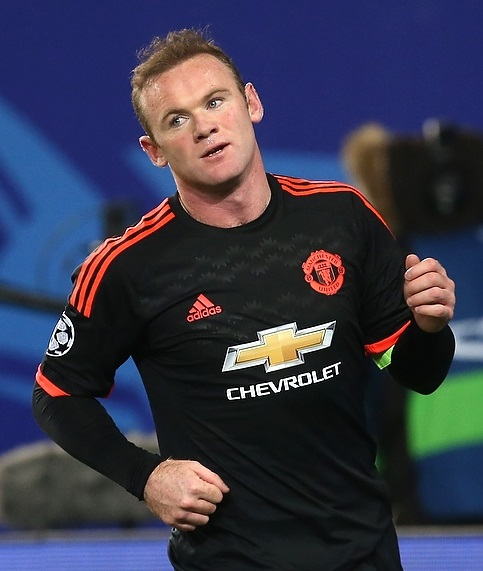
Wayne Rooney is Manchester United's all-time top scorer with 253 goals. He captained the club from 2014 to 2017.

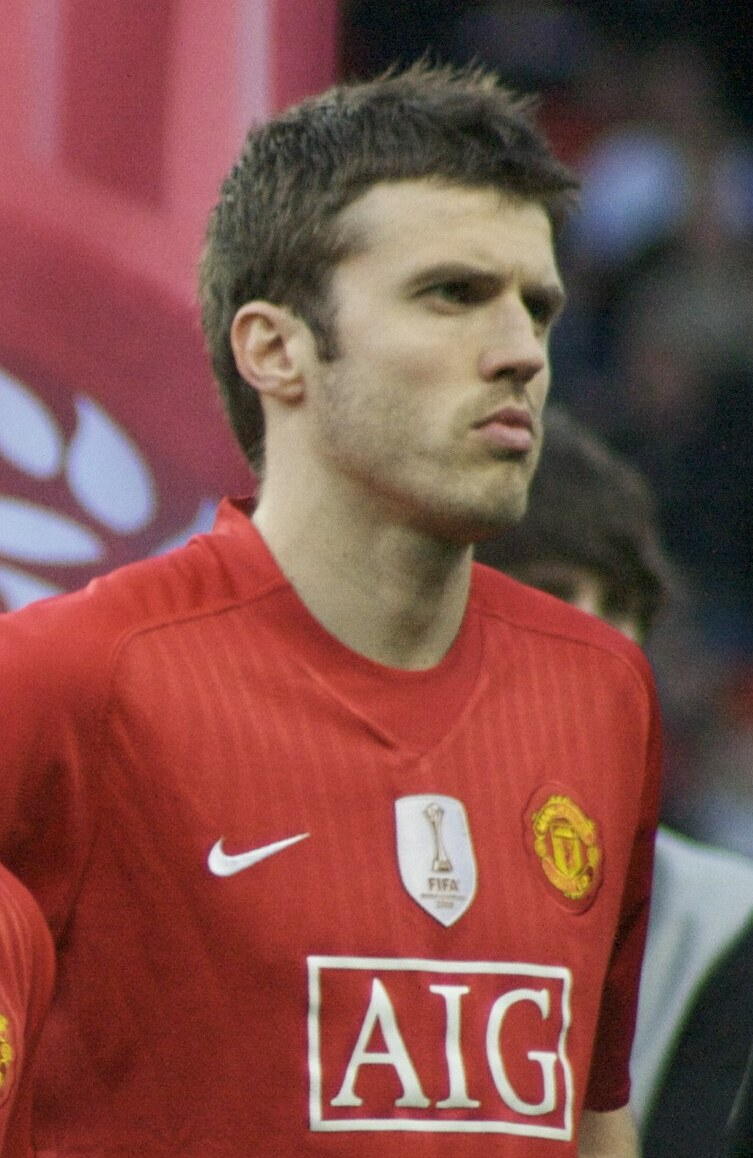
Michael Carrick made 464 appearances for Manchester United, captained the club from 2017 to 2018, and served two spells as caretaker or interim head coach in 2021 and 2026.

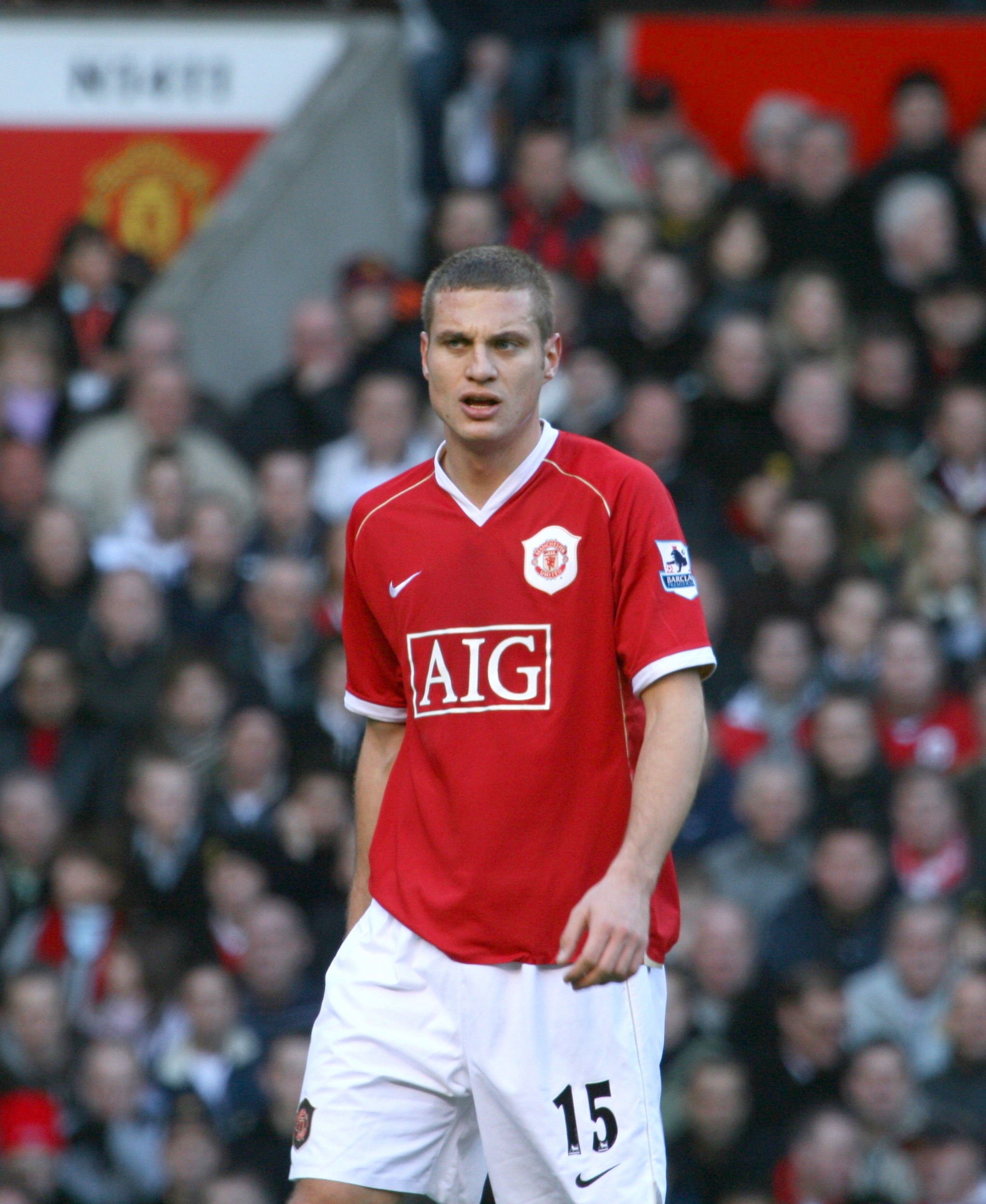
Nemanja Vidić made 300 appearances for Manchester United and served as captain from 2011 to 2014.

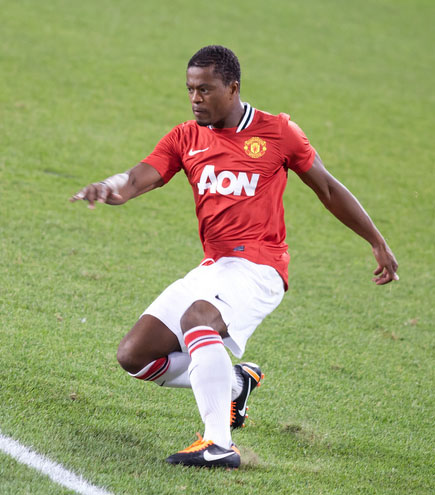
Patrice Evra made 379 appearances for United.

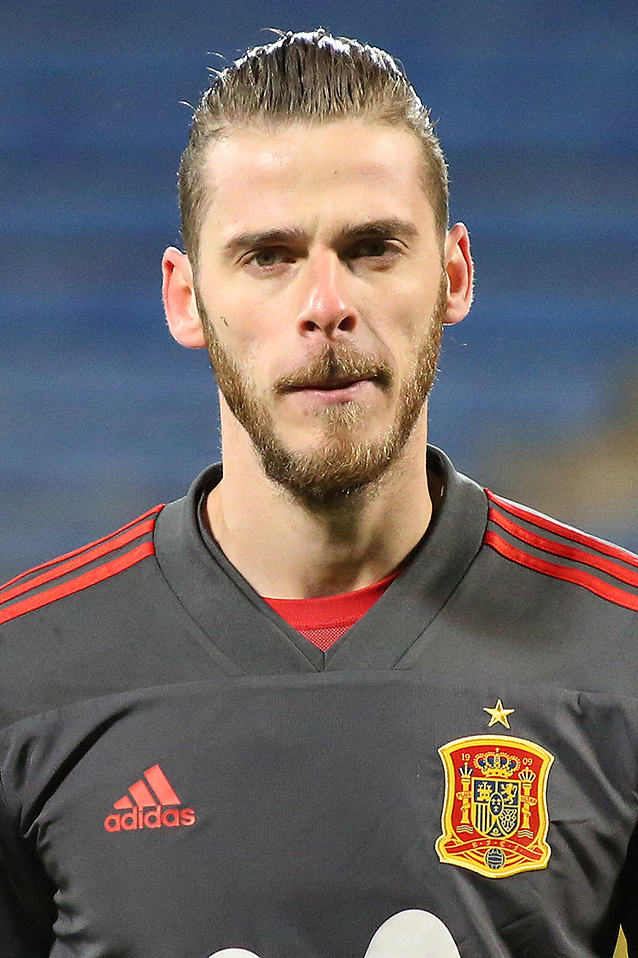
David de Gea made 545 appearances for Manchester United, the seventh-most all time.

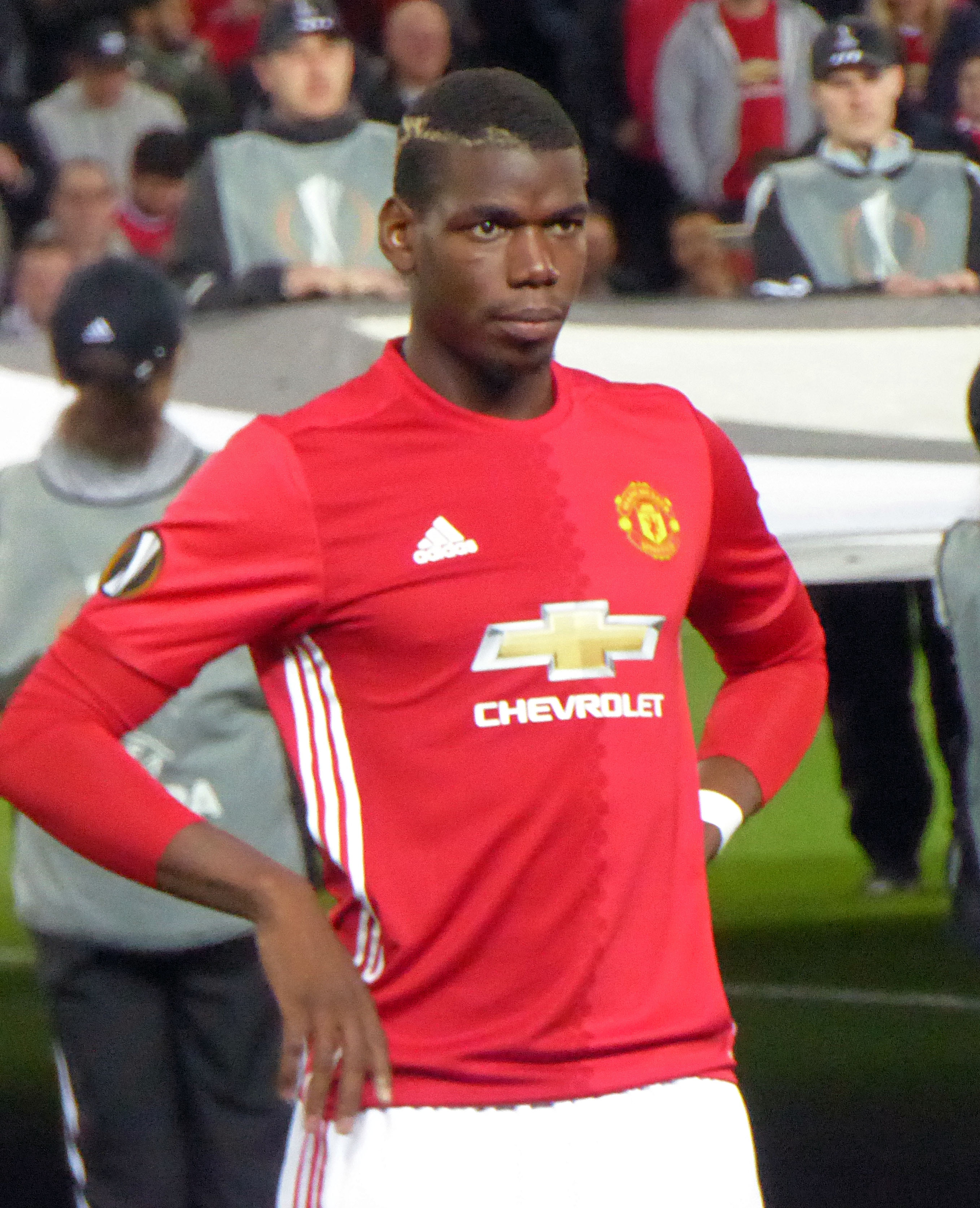
Paul Pogba made 233 appearances in two spells at Manchester United. His 2016 transfer from Juventus made him the world's most expensive footballer at the time.

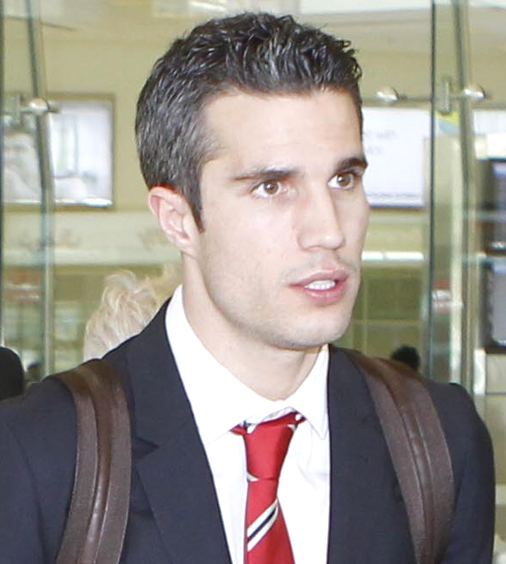
Robin van Persie made 105 appearances for Manchester United.

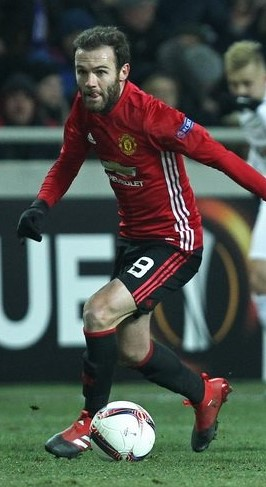
Juan Mata made 285 appearances for Manchester United.

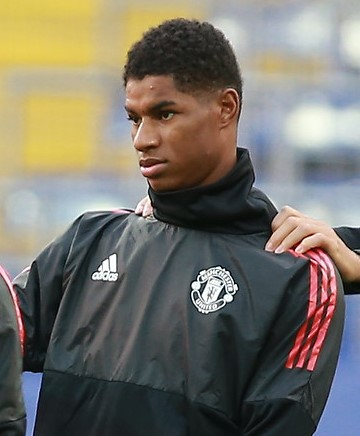
Marcus Rashford has made over 400 appearances for Manchester United.

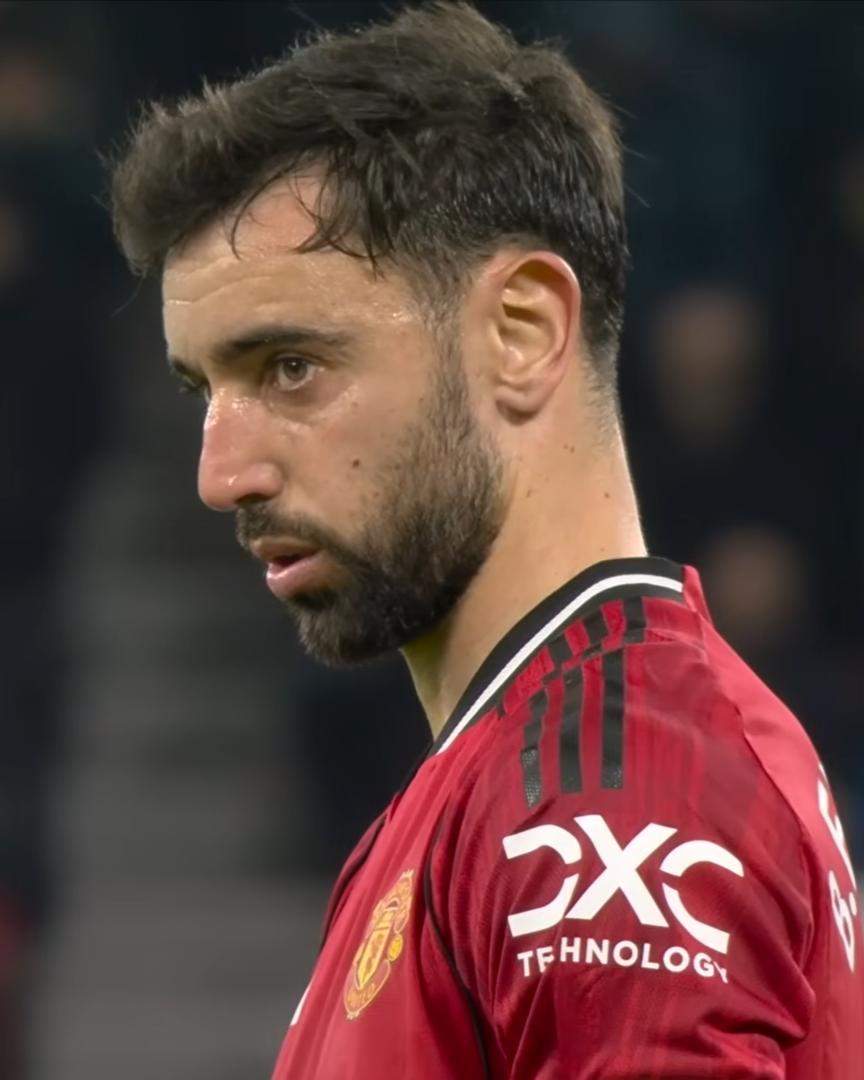
Bruno Fernandes, current club captain, has made over 300 appearances for Manchester United and has won the club's Player of the Year award a record five times

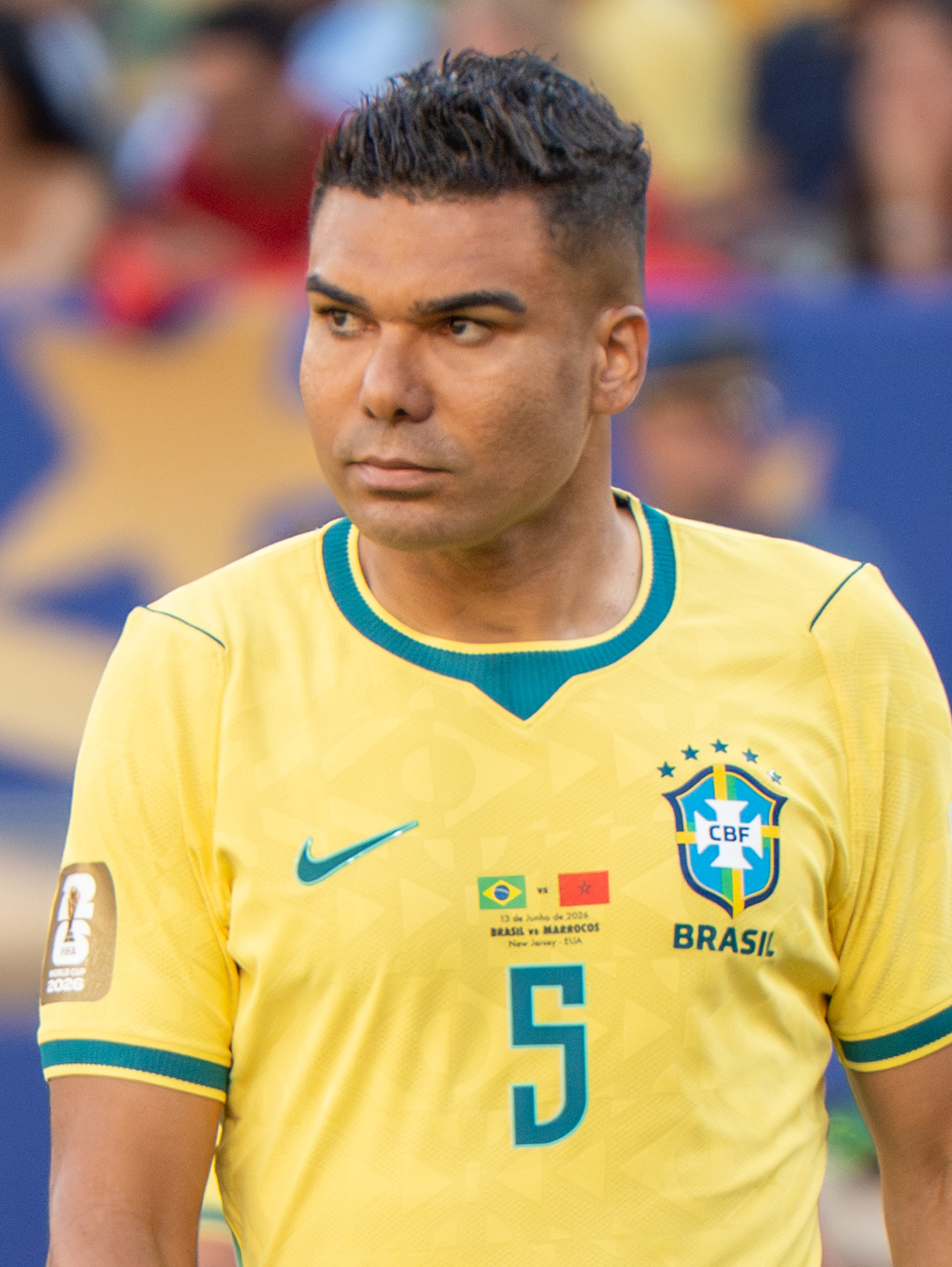
Casemiro made 160 appearances for Manchester United.
- Appearances and goals are for first-team competitive matches only, including Premier League, Football League, FA Cup, League Cup, Charity/Community Shield, European Cup/Champions League, UEFA Cup/Europa League, Cup Winners' Cup, Inter-Cities Fairs Cup, Super Cup and Club World Cup matches; wartime matches are regarded as unofficial and are excluded, as are matches from the abandoned 1939–40 season.
- Players are listed according to the date of their first-team debut for the club.
- Players in **bold** are currently under contract with Manchester United.

Statistics correct as of match played 8 November 2026

Table headers

- **Nationality** – If a player played international football, the country/countries he played for are shown. Otherwise, the player's nationality is given as their country of birth.
- **Manchester United career** – The year of the player's first appearance for Manchester United to the year of his last appearance.
- **Starts** – The number of matches started.
- **Sub** – The number of matches played as a substitute.
- **Total** – The total number of matches played, both as a starter and as a substitute.

Positions key
Pre-1960s		Post-1960s	
GK	Goalkeeper		
FB	Full back	DF	Defender
HB	Half back	MF	Midfielder
FW	Forward		
U	Utility player (Note: A utility player is one who is considered to play in more than one position.)		

List of Manchester United F.C. players with at least 100 appearances
Name	Nationality	Position	Manchester United career	Appearances			Goals	Ref
Name	Nationality	Position	Manchester United career	Starts	Subs	Total	Goals	Ref
George Perrins	England	HB	1892–1896	102	0	102	0	
Fred Erentz	Scotland	FB	1892–1902	310	0	310	9	
Bob Donaldson	Scotland	FW	1892–1897	155	0	155	66	
Joe Cassidy	Scotland	FW	1893; 1895–1900	174	0	174	100	
James McNaught	Scotland	HB	1893–1898	157	0	157	12	
Dick Smith	England	FW	1894–1898; 1900	101	0	101	37	
Walter Cartwright	England	HB	1895–1905	257	0	257	8	
Harry Stafford	England	FB	1896–1903	200	0	200	1	
William Bryant	England	FW	1896–1900	127	0	127	33	
Frank Barrett	Scotland	GK	1896–1900	136	0	136	0	
Billy Morgan	England	HB	1897–1903	152	0	152	7	
Billy Griffiths	England	HB	1899–1905	175	0	175	30	
Alf Schofield	England	FW	1900–1907	179	0	179	35	
Vince Hayes	England	FB	1901–1907; 1908–1910	128	0	128	2	
Jack Peddie	Scotland	FW	1902–1903; 1904–1907	121	0	121	58	
Alex Downie	Scotland	HB	1902–1909	191	0	191	14	
Alex Bell	Scotland	HB	1903–1913	309	0	309	10	
Bob Bonthron	Scotland	FB	1903–1907	134	0	134	3	
Harry Moger	England	GK	1903–1912	266	0	266	0	
Dick Duckworth	England	HB	1903–1915	254	0	254	11	
Charlie Roberts	England	HB	1904–1913	302	0	302	23	
Dick Holden	England	FB	1905–1914	117	0	117	0	
Jack Picken	Scotland	FW	1905–1911	122	0	122	46	
George Wall	England	FW	1906–1915	319	0	319	100	
Billy Meredith	Wales	FW	1907–1921	335	0	335	36	
Sandy Turnbull	Scotland	FW	1907–1915	247	0	247	101	
George Stacey	England	FB	1907–1915	270	0	270	9	
Harold Halse	England	FW	1908–1912	125	0	125	56	
Arthur Whalley	England	HB	1909–1920	106	0	106	6	
Enoch West	England	FW	1910–1915	181	0	181	80	
Bobby Beale	England	GK	1912–1919	112	0	112	0	
Jack Mew	England	GK	1912–1926	199	0	199	0	
Lal Hilditch	England	HB	1919–1932	322	0	322	7	
Jack Silcock	England	FB	1919–1934	449	0	449	2	
Joe Spence	England	FW	1919–1933	510	0	510	168	
Charlie Moore	England	FB	1919–1921; 1922–1931	328	0	328	0	
John Grimwood	England	HB	1919–1927	205	0	205	8	
Teddy Partridge	England	FW	1920–1929	160	0	160	18	
Alf Steward	England	GK	1920–1932	326	0	326	0	
Ray Bennion	Wales	HB	1921–1932	301	0	301	3	
Arthur Lochhead	Scotland	FW	1921–1925	153	0	153	50	
Harry Thomas	Wales	FW	1922–1931	135	0	135	13	
Frank Barson	England	HB	1922–1928	152	0	152	4	
Frank Mann	England	HB	1923–1930	197	0	197	5	
Frank McPherson	England	FW	1923–1928	175	0	175	52	
Tom Jones	Wales	FB	1924–1937	200	0	200	0	
Jimmy Hanson	England	FW	1924–1931	147	0	147	52	
Jack Wilson	England	HB	1926–1932	140	0	140	3	
Hugh McLenahan	England	HB	1928–1937	116	0	116	12	
Harry Rowley	England	FW	1928–1932; 1934–1937	180	0	180	55	
Tommy Reid	Scotland	FW	1929–1933	101	0	101	67	
George McLachlan	Scotland	FW	1929–1933	116	0	116	4	
Jack Mellor	England	FB	1930–1937	122	0	122	0	
Tom Manley	England	HB	1931–1939	195	0	195	41	
George Vose	England	HB	1933–1939	209	0	209	1	
Jack Griffiths	England	FB	1934–1944	173	0	173	1	
Bill McKay	Scotland	HB	1934–1940	182	0	182	15	
George Mutch	Scotland	FW	1934–1937	120	0	120	49	
Tommy Bamford	Wales	FW	1934–1938	109	0	109	57	
Billy Bryant	England	FW	1934–1939	157	0	157	42	
James Brown	Scotland	HB	1935–1939	110	0	110	1	
Johnny Carey	Ireland; Republic of Ireland	FB	1937–1953	344	0	344	17	
Jack Rowley	England	FW	1937–1955	424	0	424	211	
Stan Pearson	England	FW	1937–1954	343	0	343	148	
Jack Warner	Wales	HB	1938–1950	115	0	115	2	
John Aston Sr.	England	FB	1946–1954	284	0	284	30	
Allenby Chilton	England	HB	1946–1955	391	0	391	3	
Henry Cockburn	England	HB	1946–1954	275	0	275	4	
Jack Crompton	England	GK	1946–1956	212	0	212	0	
Jimmy Delaney	Scotland	FW	1946–1950	184	0	184	28	
Billy McGlen	England	HB	1946–1952	122	0	122	2	
Charlie Mitten	England	FW	1946–1952	162	0	162	61	
Johnny Downie	Scotland	FW	1949–1953	116	0	116	37	
Ray Wood	England	GK	1949–1958	208	0	208	0	
Don Gibson	England	HB	1950–1955	115	0	115	0	
Mark Jones	England	HB	1950–1958	121	0	121	1	
Johnny Berry	England	FW	1951–1958	276	0	276	45	
Jackie Blanchflower	Northern Ireland	HB	1951–1958	117	0	117	27	
Roger Byrne	England	FB	1951–1958	280	0	280	20	
David Pegg	England	FW	1952–1958	150	0	150	28	
Bill Foulkes	England	DF	1952–1970	685	3	688	9	
Tommy Taylor	England	FW	1953–1958	191	0	191	131	
Duncan Edwards	England	HB	1953–1958	177	0	177	21	
Dennis Viollet	England	FW	1953–1962	293	0	293	179	
Freddie Goodwin	England	HB	1954–1960	107	0	107	8	
Albert Scanlon	England	FW	1954–1960	127	0	127	35	
Eddie Colman	England	HB	1955–1958	108	0	108	2	
Ronnie Cope	England	HB	1956–1961	106	0	106	2	
Bobby Charlton	England	FW	1956–1973	756	2	758	249	
David Gaskell	England	GK	1956–1967	119	0	119	0	
Harry Gregg	Northern Ireland	GK	1957–1966	247	0	247	0	
Shay Brennan	Republic of Ireland	FB	1958–1970	358	1	359	6	
Albert Quixall	England	FW	1958–1963	184	0	184	56	
Johnny Giles	Republic of Ireland	FW	1959–1963	115	0	115	13	
Nobby Stiles	England	HB	1959–1971	395	0	395	19	
Maurice Setters	England	HB	1960–1964	194	0	194	14	
Tony Dunne	Republic of Ireland	DF	1960–1973	534	1	535	2	
Noel Cantwell	Republic of Ireland	FB	1960–1967	146	0	146	8	
David Herd	Scotland	FW	1961–1968	264	1	265	145	
Denis Law	Scotland	FW	1962–1973	398	6	404	237	
David Sadler	England	U	1963–1973	328	7	335	27	
Paddy Crerand	Scotland	HB	1963–1971	397	0	397	15	
George Best	Northern Ireland	FW	1963–1974	470	0	470	179	
John Connelly	England	FW	1964–1966	112	1	113	35	
John Fitzpatrick	Scotland	DF	1965–1973	141	6	147	10	
John Aston Jr.	England	FW	1965–1972	166	21	187	27	
Alex Stepney	England	GK	1966–1978	539	0	539	2	
Brian Kidd	England	FW	1967–1974	257	9	266	70	
Francis Burns	Scotland	DF	1967–1972	143	13	156	7	
Willie Morgan	Scotland	MF	1968–1975	293	3	296	34	
Steve James	England	HB	1968–1975	160	1	161	4	
Sammy McIlroy	Northern Ireland	MF	1971–1982	391	28	419	71	
Martin Buchan	Scotland	DF	1972–1983	456	0	456	4	
David McCreery	Northern Ireland	MF	1972–1979	57	53	110	8	
Alex Forsyth	Scotland	FB	1973–1978	116	3	119	5	
Lou Macari	Scotland	FW	1973–1984	374	27	401	97	
Gerry Daly	Republic of Ireland	MF	1973–1977	137	5	142	32	
Brian Greenhoff	England	DF	1973–1979	268	3	271	17	
Stewart Houston	Scotland	DF	1974–1980	248	2	250	16	
Stuart Pearson	England	FW	1974–1979	179	1	180	66	
Arthur Albiston	Scotland	FB	1974–1988	467	18	485	7	
Steve Coppell	England	MF	1975–1983	393	3	396	70	
Jimmy Nicholl	Northern Ireland	DF	1975–1981	235	13	248	6	
Gordon Hill	England	MF	1975–1978	133	1	134	51	
Jimmy Greenhoff	England	FW	1976–1980	119	4	123	36	
Ashley Grimes	Republic of Ireland	DF	1977–1983	77	30	107	11	
Joe Jordan	Scotland	FW	1978–1981	125	1	126	41	
Gordon McQueen	Scotland	DF	1978–1985	229	0	229	26	
Gary Bailey	England	GK	1978–1987	375	0	375	0	
Mickey Thomas	Wales	MF	1978–1981	110	0	110	15	
Kevin Moran	Republic of Ireland	DF	1979–1988	284	5	289	24	
Ray Wilkins	England	MF	1979–1984	191	3	194	10	
Mike Duxbury	England	DF	1980–1990	345	33	378	7	
John Gidman	England	DF	1981–1986	116	4	120	4	
Frank Stapleton	Republic of Ireland	FW	1981–1987	267	21	288	78	
Remi Moses	England	MF	1981–1988	188	11	199	12	
Bryan Robson	England	MF	1981–1994	437	24	461	99	
Norman Whiteside	Northern Ireland	FW	1982–1989	256	18	274	67	
Paul McGrath	Republic of Ireland	DF	1982–1989	192	7	199	16	
Mark Hughes	Wales	FW	1983–1986; 1988–1995	453	14	467	163	
Graeme Hogg	Scotland	DF	1984–1988	108	2	110	1	
Clayton Blackmore	Wales	U	1984–1994	201	44	245	26	
Jesper Olsen	Denmark	MF	1984–1988	149	27	176	24	
Gordon Strachan	Scotland	MF	1984–1989	195	6	201	38	
Peter Davenport	England	FW	1986–1988	83	23	106	26	
Brian McClair	Scotland	U	1987–1998	398	73	471	127	
Steve Bruce	England	DF	1987–1996	411	3	414	51	
Lee Martin	England	DF	1988–1994	84	25	109	2	
Lee Sharpe	England	MF	1988–1996	213	50	263	36	
Mal Donaghy	Northern Ireland	DF	1988–1992	98	21	119	0	
Mike Phelan	England	U	1989–1994	127	19	146	3	
Neil Webb	England	MF	1989–1992	105	5	110	11	
Gary Pallister	England	DF	1989–1998	433	4	437	15	
Paul Ince	England	MF	1989–1995	276	5	281	29	
Denis Irwin	Republic of Ireland	DF	1990–2002	511	18	529	33	
Ryan Giggs	Wales	MF	1991–2014	802	161	963	168	
Andrei Kanchelskis	Soviet Union; CIS; Russia	MF	1991–1995	132	29	161	36	
Paul Parker	England	DF	1991–1996	137	9	146	2	
Peter Schmeichel	Denmark	GK	1991–1999	398	0	398	1	
Gary Neville	England	DF	1992–2011	566	36	602	7	
David Beckham	England	MF	1992–2003	356	38	394	85	
Nicky Butt	England	MF	1992–2004	307	80	387	26	
Eric Cantona	France	FW	1992–1997	184	1	185	82	
Roy Keane	Republic of Ireland	MF	1993–2005	458	22	480	51	
David May	England	DF	1994–2002	98	20	118	8	
Paul Scholes	England	MF	1994–2011; 2012–2013	577	141	718	155	
Andy Cole	England	FW	1995–2001	231	44	275	121	
Phil Neville	England	U	1995–2005	301	85	386	8	
Ronny Johnsen	Norway	DF	1996–2002	131	19	150	9	
Ole Gunnar Solskjær	Norway	FW	1996–2007	216	150	366	126	
Teddy Sheringham	England	FW	1997–2001	101	52	153	46	
Henning Berg	Norway	DF	1997–2000	81	22	103	3	
Wes Brown	England	DF	1998–2011	313	49	362	5	
Jaap Stam	Netherlands	DF	1998–2001	125	2	127	1	
Dwight Yorke	Trinidad and Tobago	FW	1998–2002	120	32	152	66	
Quinton Fortune	South Africa	MF	1999–2006	88	38	126	11	
Mikaël Silvestre	France	DF	1999–2008	326	35	361	10	
John O'Shea	Republic of Ireland	U	1999–2011	301	92	393	15	
Fabien Barthez	France	GK	2000–2004	139	0	139	0	
Ruud van Nistelrooy	Netherlands	FW	2001–2006	200	19	219	150	
Rio Ferdinand	England	DF	2002–2014	444	11	455	8	
Darren Fletcher	Scotland	MF	2003–2015	266	76	342	24	
Cristiano Ronaldo	Portugal	MF	2003–2009; 2021–2022	289	57	346	145	
Louis Saha	France	FW	2004–2008	76	48	124	42	
Wayne Rooney	England	FW	2004–2017	497	62	559	253	
Edwin van der Sar	Netherlands	GK	2005–2011	266	0	266	0	
Park Ji-sung	South Korea	MF	2005–2012	146	59	205	27	
Patrice Evra	France	DF	2006–2014	357	22	379	10	
Nemanja Vidić	Serbia and Montenegro; Serbia	DF	2006–2014	290	10	300	21	
Michael Carrick	England	MF	2006–2018	395	69	464	24	
Nani	Portugal	MF	2007–2015	178	52	230	40	
Anderson	Brazil	MF	2007–2015	128	53	181	9	
Jonny Evans	Northern Ireland	DF	2007–2015; 2023–2025	202	39	241	8	
Dimitar Berbatov	Bulgaria	FW	2008–2012	108	41	149	56	
Rafael	Brazil	DF	2008–2015	150	20	170	5	
Danny Welbeck	England	FW	2008–2014	90	52	142	29	
Antonio Valencia	Ecuador	U	2009–2019	277	62	339	25	
Javier Hernández	Mexico	FW	2010–2015	85	72	157	59	
Chris Smalling	England	DF	2010–2019	281	42	323	18	
David de Gea	Spain	GK	2011–2023	545	0	545	0	
Phil Jones	England	U	2011–2022	198	31	229	6	
Ashley Young	England	U	2011–2020	202	59	261	19	
Paul Pogba	France	MF	2011–2012; 2016–2022	195	38	233	39	
Robin van Persie	Netherlands	FW	2012–2015	89	16	105	58	
Marouane Fellaini	Belgium	MF	2013–2019	106	71	177	22	
Juan Mata	Spain	MF	2014–2022	213	72	285	51	
Daley Blind	Netherlands	U	2014–2018	132	9	141	6	
Jesse Lingard	England	FW	2014–2022	143	89	232	35	
Ander Herrera	Spain	MF	2014–2019	140	49	189	20	
Marcos Rojo	Argentina	DF	2014–2019	105	17	122	2	
**Luke Shaw**	England	DF	2014–	296	33	329	5	
Anthony Martial	France	FW	2015–2023	222	96	318	90	
**Marcus Rashford**	England	FW	2016–	318	115	433	138	
Eric Bailly	Ivory Coast	DF	2016–2021	99	14	113	1	
Nemanja Matić	Serbia	MF	2017–2022	152	37	189	4	
Victor Lindelöf	Sweden	DF	2017–2025	247	37	284	4	
Scott McTominay	Scotland	MF	2017–2024	172	83	255	29	
Fred	Brazil	MF	2018–2023	154	59	213	14	
**Diogo Dalot**	Portugal	DF	2018–	226	33	259	10	
Mason Greenwood	England	FW	2019–2022	84	46	130	35	
**Harry Maguire**	England	DF	2019–	242	41	283	17	
Aaron Wan-Bissaka	DR Congo	DF	2019–2024	178	12	190	2	
**Bruno Fernandes**	Portugal	MF	2020–	323	17	340	113	
**Amad Diallo**	Ivory Coast	FW	2021–	68	37	105	16	
Alejandro Garnacho	Argentina	FW	2022–2025	88	56	144	26	
**Lisandro Martínez**	Argentina	DF	2022–	101	18	119	4	
Casemiro	Brazil	MF	2022–2026	138	22	160	26	
Christian Eriksen	Denmark	MF	2022–2025	70	37	107	8	
**André Onana**	Cameroon	GK	2023–	102	0	102	0	
**Kobbie Mainoo**	England	MF	2023–	78	34	112	8	
