= 1900–01 Newton Heath F.C. season =

English football club season

Newton Heath
1900–01 season
- Secretary: James West
- Stadium: Bank Street Ground
- Second Division: 10th
- FA Cup: First Round
- Top goalscorer: League: Tom Leigh (14); All: Tom Leigh (14)
- Highest home attendance: 10,000 vs Blackpool (26 December 1900); 10,000 vs Burnley (12 January 1901); 10,000 vs Burnley (9 February 1901)
- Lowest home attendance: 1,000 vs Chesterfield (27 April 1901)
- Average home league attendance: 5,658
Home colours	Away colours

The 1900–01 season was Newton Heath's ninth season in the Football League and their seventh in the Second Division. They finished 10th in the league, some way off the promotion places. In the FA Cup, the Heathens were knocked out by Burnley after a replay in the First Round, having beaten Portsmouth in the Intermediate Round.

The club also entered teams in the Lancashire and Manchester Senior Cups in 1900–01. Although they were knocked out by Manchester City in the second round of the Lancashire Cup, the Heathens managed to reach the final of the Manchester Senior Cup for the first time since 1893 before being beaten by the same opposition.

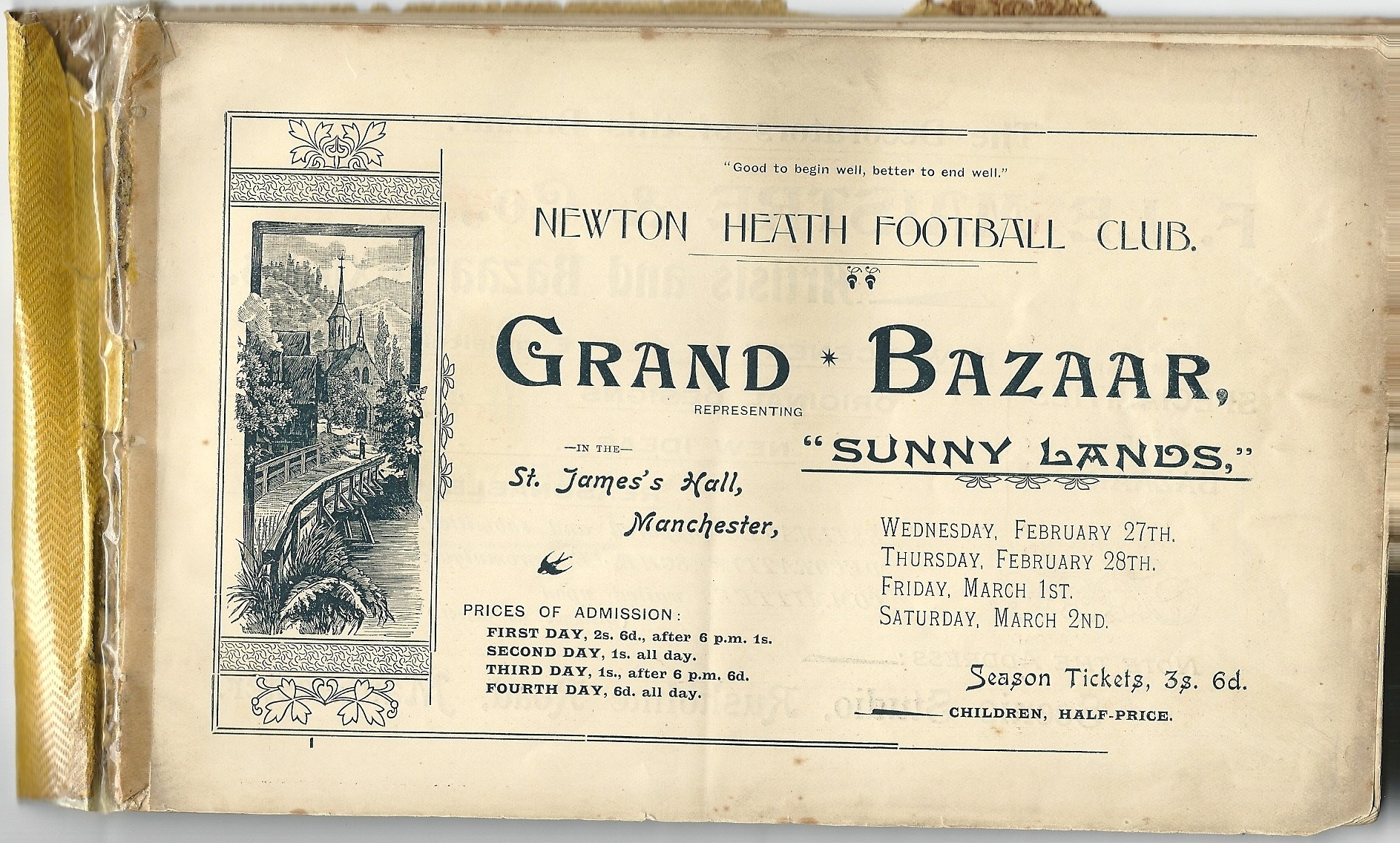
Leaflet for a fundraising bazaar for Newton Heath, February–March 1901.

== Second Division ==
Date	Opponents	H / A	Result F–A	Scorers	Attendance
1 September 1900	Glossop	A	0–1		2,000
8 September 1900	Middlesbrough	H	4–0	Griffiths, Grundy, Jackson, Leigh	8,000
15 September 1900	Burnley	A	0–1		2,000
22 September 1900	Burslem Port Vale	H	4–0	Grundy, Leigh, Schofield (2)	6,000
29 September 1900	Leicester Fosse	A	0–1		6,000
6 October 1900	New Brighton Tower	H	1–0	Jackson	5,000
13 October 1900	Gainsborough Trinity	A	1–0	Leigh	2,000
20 October 1900	Walsall	H	1–1	Schofield	8,000
27 October 1900	Burton Swifts	A	1–3	Leigh	2,000
10 November 1900	Woolwich Arsenal	A	1–2	Jackson	8,000
24 November 1900	Stockport County	A	0–1		5,000
1 December 1900	Small Heath	H	0–1		5,000
8 December 1900	Grimsby Town	A	0–2		4,000
15 December 1900	Lincoln City	H	4–1	Leigh (3), H. Morgan	4,000
22 December 1900	Chesterfield	A	1–2	Hancock (o.g.)	4,000
26 December 1900	Blackpool	H	4–0	Griffiths, Leigh, B. Morgan, Schofield	10,000
29 December 1900	Glossop	H	3–0	Leigh (2), H. Morgan	8,000
1 January 1901	Middlesbrough	A	2–1	Schofield (2)	12,000
12 January 1901	Burnley	H	0–1		10,000
19 January 1901	Burslem Port Vale	A	0–2		1,000
16 February 1901	Gainsborough Trinity	H	0–0		3,000
19 February 1901	New Brighton Tower	A	0–2		2,000
25 February 1901	Walsall	A	1–1	B. Morgan	2,000
2 March 1901	Burton Swifts	H	1–1	Leigh	5,000
13 March 1901	Barnsley	H	1–0	Leigh	6,000
16 March 1901	Woolwich Arsenal	H	1–0	Leigh	5,000
20 March 1901	Leicester Fosse	H	2–3	Fisher (2)	2,000
23 March 1901	Blackpool	A	2–1	Griffiths (2)	2,000
30 March 1901	Stockport County	H	3–1	Leigh, H. Morgan, Schofield	4,000
5 April 1901	Lincoln City	A	0–2		5,000
6 April 1901	Small Heath	A	0–1		6,000
9 April 1901	Barnsley	A	2–6	Jackson, B. Morgan	3,000
13 April 1901	Grimsby Town	H	1–0	H. Morgan	3,000
27 April 1901	Chesterfield	H	1–0	Leigh	1,000

Pos	Team	Pld	W	D	L	GF	GA	GAv	Pts
8	Lincoln City	34	13	7	14	43	39	1.103	33
9	Burslem Port Vale	34	11	11	12	45	47	0.957	33
10	Newton Heath	34	14	4	16	42	38	1.105	32
11	Leicester Fosse	34	11	10	13	39	37	1.054	32
12	Blackpool	34	12	7	15	33	58	0.569	31

Rules for classification: 1) Points; 2) Goal average; 3) Goals scored

== FA Cup ==
Date	Round	Opponents	H / A	Result F–A	Scorers	Attendance
5 January 1901	Intermediate Round	Portsmouth	H	3–0	Griffiths, Stafford, Jackson	5,000
9 February 1901	First Round	Burnley	H	0–0		10,000
13 February 1901	First Round; Replay	Burnley	A	1–7	Schofield	4,000
