= Billy Grassam =

Scottish footballer

- Grassam while with West Ham United in 1903.

Personal information
- Full name: William Grassam
- Date of birth: 20 November 1878
- Place of birth: Larbert, Scotland
- Date of death: 1943 (aged 64–65)
- Place of death: Erie County, New York, United States
- Height: 5 ft 9 in (1.75 m)
- Position: Inside right

Youth career
- Redcliffe Thistle

Senior career*
Years	Team	Apps	(Gls)
1897–1899	Maryhill		
1899–1900	Burslem Port Vale	31	(5)
1900–1903	West Ham United	78	(41)
1903	Celtic	2	(0)
1903–1905	Manchester United	29	(13)
1905	Leyton		
1905–1909	West Ham United	91	(24)
1909–1910	Brentford	4	(0)
Total		235	(83)
- * Club domestic league appearances and goals

William Grassam (20 November 1878 – 1943) was a Scottish footballer who played as a forward.

== Career ==
Grassam played for Scottish Junior Football Association sides Redcliffe Thistle and Maryhill before joining English side Burslem Port Vale in July 1899. He scored three goals in the opening five Second Division fixtures of the 1899–1900 campaign, and finished the season with ten goals in 41 games. In the summer of 1900 he moved on to West Ham United of the Southern League. On 1 September 1900, he became the first West Ham player to score a hat-trick, when he scored four goals on his debut against Gravesend United. The club finished sixth in 1900–01. He finished as the club's joint-top scorer (with George Ratcliffe) in 1901–02 with 10 goals. After West Ham finished tenth in 1902–03, Grassam returned to Scotland with Celtic.

In September 1903, he returned to England to join Manchester United. He scored 11 goals in 23 games in his first season with the club, becoming joint-top scorer in the league (with Billy Griffiths and Tommy Arkesden). However, he fell out of favour the following season, contributing just two goals in six league games, before moving on to Leyton in July 1905. He rejoined West Ham later that year, where he built up a solid partnership with Harry Stapley. The Boleyn Ground club finished 11th in 1905–06, 5th in 1906–07, 10th in 1907–08, 17th in 1908–09, and 9th in 1909–10. Having lost his first-team place to Danny Shea, Grassam moved on to league rivals Brentford in 1910. He was the second-highest goal scorer of the period for the "Hammers" behind Shea before the club joined the Football League in 1919.

== Career statistics ==
Appearances and goals by club, season and competition
Club	Season	League			National cup (Note: Includes FA Cup, Scottish Cup)		Total	
Club	Season	Division	Apps	Goals	Apps	Goals	Apps	Goals
Burslem Port Vale	1899–1900	Second Division	31	5	4	1	35	6
West Ham United	1900–01	Southern First Division	20	12	3	3	23	15
West Ham United	1901–02	Southern First Division	29	10	1	0	30	10
West Ham United	1902–03	Southern First Division	29	19	1	0	30	19
West Ham United	Total		78	41	5	3	83	44
Celtic	1903–04	Scottish First Division	2	0	—		2	0
Manchester United	1903–04	Second Division	23	11	5	1	28	12
Manchester United	1904–05	Second Division	6	2	3	0	9	2
Manchester United	Total		29	13	8	1	37	14
West Ham United	1905–06	Southern First Division	14	3	0	0	14	3
West Ham United	1906–07	Southern First Division	37	10	2	0	39	10
West Ham United	1907–08	Southern First Division	32	9	2	0	34	9
West Ham United	1908–09	Southern First Division	8	2	1	0	9	2
West Ham United	West Ham United total		91	24	5	0	96	24
Brentford	1909–10	Southern First Division	4	0	—		4	0
Career total			235	83	22	5	257	88
