= Clem Beddow =

English footballer

Personal information
- Full name: Jonathon Harry Beddow
- Date of birth: October 1885
- Place of birth: Burton upon Trent, England
- Date of death: Unknown
- Height: 6 ft 1 in (1.85 m)
- Position: Forward

Senior career*
Years	Team	Apps	(Gls)
19xx–1904	Trent Rovers	?	(?)
1904–1905	Burton United	21	(2)
1905–1907	Manchester United	33	(12)
1907–1909	Burnley	16	(7)
- * Club domestic league appearances and goals

Jonathon Harry "Clem" Beddow (born October 1885, deceased) was an English footballer. His regular position was as a forward. He was born in Burton upon Trent, Staffordshire. He played for Trent Rovers, Burton United, Manchester United and Burnley.

== Football career ==
Beddow started his career in amateur football with Trent Rovers before joining Football League Second Division side Burton United in 1904. After making 21 league appearances and scoring twice for Burton during the 1904–05 season, he signed for rival Second Division club Manchester United in February 1905. Beddow made his debut for the club on 25 February 1905 in the goalless draw away at Barnsley. He scored his first goal for Manchester United in the 6–0 win against Doncaster Rovers on 1 April 1905 at Old Trafford. During the 1905–06 season he netted 11 goals, including a hat-trick against Grimsby Town in the 5–0 victory on 6 January 1906. Beddow also scored a hat-trick the following week as United progressed to the Second Round of the FA Cup with a 7–2 home win over non-League outfit Staple Hill.

The three goals in the FA Cup tie turned out to be Beddow's last for Manchester United. Following the side's promotion to the First Division for the 1906–07 season, he played only sparingly. In July 1907 he returned to the Second Division, joining Burnley on a free transfer. Beddow played his first competitive game for his new club in the first match of the 1907–08 season, a 0–5 defeat away to West Bromwich Albion. The following week, he scored twice as Burnley secured a 3–1 win against Stoke at Turf Moor. After losing his place in the team for a short period, Beddow netted twice on his return as Burnley won 3–2 away at Barnsley on 19 October. During November, he scored in consecutive matches against Grimsby Town and Oldham Athletic. However, he was dropped for the game against Stockport County on 14 December in favour of young William Short, making his senior debut. Beddow did not appear again for Burnley that season, unable to displace first Alex Leake and later Frederick Whittaker from the starting eleven.

Beddow struggled to force his way back into the first team in the 1908–09 campaign, making just two league appearances without scoring. The following season, he was used only once, selected at right outside forward ahead of Jonathan Morley for the visit of Hull City on 8 September 1909. However, Burnley were beaten by a single goal and youngster George Clarke was picked for the next match, and Beddow left the club shortly afterwards.
