= Alex Menzies (forward) =

Scottish footballer (1882–1964)

Personal information
- Full name: Alexander William Menzies
- Date of birth: 25 November 1882
- Place of birth: Blantyre, Scotland
- Date of death: 1964 (aged 81–82)
- Place of death: Blantyre, Scotland
- Position: Centre forward

Senior career*
Years	Team	Apps	(Gls)
- Blantyre Victoria
1902–1906	Heart of Midlothian	40	(23)
1903–1904	→ Motherwell (loan)	5	(3)
1904–1905	→ Arthurlie (loan)	16	(11)
1906–1907	Manchester United	23	(4)
1908–1909	Luton Town		
1909	Dundee	2	(2)
1910	Hamilton Academical	6	(2)
1910	Port Glasgow Athletic	7	(3)
1910–1912	Dumbarton	8	(8)

International career
1906	Scotland	1	(0)
- * Club domestic league appearances and goals

Alexander William Menzies (25 November 1882 – 1964) was a Scottish footballer who played as a forward for Heart of Midlothian and Manchester United in the 1900s.

Born in Blantyre, South Lanarkshire, Menzies began his football career with local Blantyre Victoria in 1901. He signed for Hearts in December 1902, making two appearances for the club before being sent on loan to Motherwell then Arthurlie for a season apiece. On his return to Hearts he became a regular in the side, winning the Scottish Cup in 1906.

In November 1906 Menzies was sold to Manchester United. He played for the Red Devils until the end of the 1906–07 season, making 25 appearances and scoring four goals, before being sold to Luton Town. He then moved back to Scotland with Dundee, Hamilton Academical and Port Glasgow Athletic, before finishing his career at Dumbarton.

Menzies made one appearance for Scotland, a 2–1 win over England in April 1906.
