= Tommy Leigh (footballer, born 1875) =

English footballer

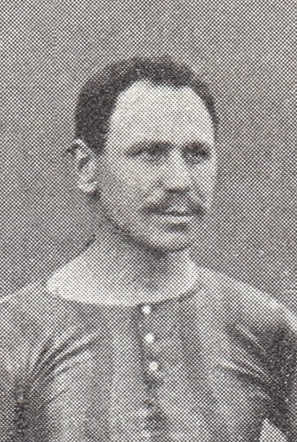
- Leigh while with Brentford in 1903

Personal information
- Full name: Thomas Leigh
- Date of birth: 2 February 1875
- Place of birth: Derby, England
- Date of death: 24 January 1914 (aged 38)
- Place of death: Derby, England
- Position: Centre forward

Senior career*
Years	Team	Apps	(Gls)
1895	Derby County	0	(0)
1896–1898	Burton Swifts	73	(26)
1898–1899	New Brighton Tower	12	(4)
1899–1900	Newton Heath	43	(16)
1901–1903	New Brompton	32	(12)
1903–1904	Brentford	19	(1)
- * Club domestic league appearances and goals

Thomas Leigh (2 February 1875 – 24 January 1914) was an English professional footballer who played as a centre-forward. Born in Derby, he played in the Football League for New Brighton Tower, Burton Swifts and Newton Heath. He also played in the Southern League for New Brompton and Brentford.

== Career statistics ==
Appearances and goals by club, season and competition
Club	Season	League			FA Cup		Total	
Club	Season	Division	Apps	Goals	Apps	Goals	Apps	Goals
Burton Swifts	1896–97	Second Division	27	10	0	0	27	10
Burton Swifts	1897–98	Second Division	28	12	0	0	28	12
Burton Swifts	1898–99	Second Division	18	4	0	0	18	4
Burton Swifts	Total		73	26	0	0	73	26
New Brighton Tower	1898–99	Second Division	2	0	0	0	2	0
New Brighton Tower	1899–1900	Second Division	10	4	0	0	10	4
New Brighton Tower	Total		12	4	0	0	12	4
Newton Heath	1899–1900	Second Division	9	1	0	0	9	1
Newton Heath	1900–01	Second Division	34	15	3	0	37	15
Newton Heath	Total		43	16	3	0	46	16
New Brompton	1901–02	Southern League First Division	27	10	5	4	32	14
New Brompton	1902–03	Southern League First Division	8	2	3	3	11	5
New Brompton	Total		35	12	8	7	43	19
Brentford	1903–04	Southern League First Division	19	1	5	3	24	4
Career total			182	59	16	10	198	69
