= Bernard Donaghey =

Northern Irish footballer (1882–1916)

Personal information
- Full name: Bernard Donaghey
- Date of birth: 23 December 1882
- Place of birth: Derry, Ireland
- Date of death: 1 July 1916 (aged 33)
- Place of death: near Beaumont-Hamel, France
- Height: 5 ft 4 in (1.63 m)
- Position: Inside forward

Senior career*
Years	Team	Apps	(Gls)
1900–1902	Derry Celtic		(3)
1902	Ulster		
	Belfast Celtic		(8)
1904	Glentoran	2	
1904–1905	Hibernian	15	(8)
1905	Derry Celtic		
1905–1906	Manchester United	3	(0)
1906–1907	Derry Celtic		
1907–1908	Burnley	5	(2)
–1914	Derry Celtic		(17)
1914	Dumbarton Harp		

International career
1902–1905	Irish League XI	2	(0)
1902	Ireland	1	(0)
- * Club domestic league appearances and goals

Bernard Donaghey (23 December 1882 – 1 July 1916), sometimes known as Barney Donaghey, was an Irish professional footballer, who played as an inside forward in the Football League for Burnley and Manchester United. He also played in the Scottish League for Hibernian and in his native Ireland for Derry Celtic (four spells), Ulster, Belfast Celtic and Glentoran. Donaghey was capped by Ireland at international level and represented the Irish League.

== Personal life ==
Donaghey was a Catholic and was married. Prior to the First World War, Donaghey was a reservist in the British Army and in early 1915, during the second year of the war, he enlisted as a private in the Royal Inniskilling Fusiliers. He saw action at Gallipoli and was wounded in the head by shrapnel and evacuated to a hospital in Tanta, Egypt. After being deployed to the Western Front in 1916, Donaghey was killed on the first day on the Somme, during his battalion's attack on German trench lines and the Y-Ravine strongpoint, south of Beaumont-Hamel. His body was never recovered and he is commemorated on the Thiepval Memorial.

== Honours ==
Derry Celtic

- North West Senior Cup (2): 1900–01, 1901–02

== Career statistics ==
Appearances and goals by club, season and competition
Club	Season	League			National Cup		Total	
Club	Season	Division	Apps	Goals	Apps	Goals	Apps	Goals
Glentoran	1903–04	Irish League	2	0	0	0	2	0
Hibernian	1904–05	Scottish First Division	15	8	2	0	17	8
Manchester United	1905–06	Second Division	3	0	0	0	3	0
Burnley	1907–08	Second Division	5	2	0	0	5	2
Career total			23	10	2	0	25	10
