= George Clarke (winger) =

English footballer

Personal information
- Position: Outside right

Senior career*
| Years | Team | Apps | (Gls) |
| 1908–1910 | Burnley | 3 | (0) |
- Hyde
- * Club domestic league appearances and goals

George Clarke was an English professional association footballer who played as an outside right for Burnley.
