= William Short (footballer) =

English footballer

Personal information
- Full name: William Short
- Place of birth: England
- Position: Inside forward

Senior career*
Years	Team	Apps	(Gls)
1907–1908	Burnley	3	(0)
- * Club domestic league appearances and goals

William Short was an English professional footballer who played as an inside forward.
