= William McCartney (footballer) =

Scottish footballer

Billy McCartney
Personal information
- Full name: William McCartney
- Place of birth: Newmilns, Ayrshire, Scotland
- Position: Inside left

Senior career*
Years	Team	Apps	(Gls)
- Rutherglen Glencairn
- Ayr
1899–1903	Hibernian	65	(15)
1903–1904	Manchester United	13	(1)
1904–1905	West Ham United	28	(3)
- Broxburn
- Lochgelly United
1906–1913	Clyde	128	(22)
1908	→ Broxburn (loan)		

International career
1902	Scotland	1	(0)
1902–1903	Scottish Football League XI	2	(0)
- * Club domestic league appearances and goals

William McCartney (born in Newmilns) was a Scottish footballer, whose regular position was as an inside left. He played for Rutherglen Glencairn, Ayr, Hibernian, Manchester United, and West Ham United. McCartney played once for Scotland, in a 5–1 win against Ireland in the 1902 British Home Championship. He also represented the Scottish League twice against the English League in 1902 and 1903.

McCartney helped Hibs to win the 1901–02 Scottish Cup, but missed the final due to a broken leg, and the 1903 Scottish league championship. He was transferred to Manchester United in 1903, and then moved to West Ham United after one season.

His single season at West Ham, the 1904–05 campaign, saw him make 28 Southern League First Division appearances. His two goals from open play came home and away against Southampton, and his only other goal for the club came from the penalty spot, against Bristol Rovers on 8 April 1905. He also made one FA Cup appearance for the Irons, a sixth-round qualifying match against Brighton and Hove Albion.
