= Arthur Young (footballer) =

Scottish footballer

Arthur Young (fl. 1906) was a Scottish footballer. His regular position was as an outside right. He played for Hurlford Thistle and Manchester United. He made his Football League debut on 27 October 1906, when he played in a 2–1 home win Birmingham.
