= Jonathan Morley =

English footballer

Personal information
- Full name: Jonathan Bell Morley
- Date of birth: 29 January 1884
- Place of birth: Carlisle, England
- Date of death: 1957 (aged 72 or 73)
- Position: Winger

Senior career*
Years	Team	Apps	(Gls)
- Workington
1907–1908	Sunderland	5	(1)
1908–1911	Burnley	96	(15)
1911–1915	Preston North End	94	(15)
- * Club domestic league appearances and goals

Jonathan Bell Morley (29 January 1884 – 1957) was an English professional footballer who played as a winger.
