= William Yates (footballer) =

English footballer

Personal information
- Full name: William Yates
- Date of birth: 1883
- Place of birth: Birmingham, England
- Date of death: Unknown
- Position: Inside forward

Senior career*
Years	Team	Apps	(Gls)
- Witton Shell Shop
- Erdington
1903–1905	Aston Villa	1	(0)
1905–1906	Brighton & Hove Albion	33	(4)
1906–1907	Manchester United	3	(0)
1907–1908	Heart of Midlothian	12	(5)
1908–1911	Portsmouth	107	
1911–1914	Coventry City	106	
- * Club domestic league appearances and goals

William Yates (1883 – after 1914), known as was an English professional footballer who played as an inside forward in the Football League for Manchester United, in the Southern League for Brighton & Hove Albion, Portsmouth and Coventry City, and in the Scottish League for Heart of Midlothian.

== Life and career ==
Yates was born in Birmingham, where he played local football before joining Aston Villa in 1903. He made one appearance for Villa's first team, and moved on after two years to Brighton & Hove Albion of the Southern League. He missed only one match in the 1905–06 Southern League season, and scored three goals as the team progressed to the second round proper (last 32) of that season's FA Cup, in which they lost to Middlesbrough after two replays.

During the close season, he and Frank Buckley were transferred to Manchester United of the Football League First Division. He made his debut on 15 September 1906 in a 2–0 win against Sheffield United, but played only twice more before moving on to the Scottish First Division with Heart of Midlothian in January 1907.

He spent a year in Scotland, scoring five goals from twelve league appearances and playing on the losing side in the 1907 Scottish Cup Final. becoming the first English man to play in a Scottish FA Cup final. According to the Glasgow Herald's match report, "only [Bobby] Walker and Yates were effective forward" for Hearts.

Returning to England in January 1908, he spent three years apiece with Portsmouth and Coventry City, making more than 100 Southern League appearances for each. He retired because of injury in 1914, and went on to keep a pub in Coventry.
