= Proctor Hall =

English footballer

Personal information
- Full name: Proctor Ratcliffe Hall
- Date of birth: 26 December 1882
- Place of birth: Blackburn, England
- Date of death: 2 October 1957 (aged 74)
- Place of death: Heath Charnock, Lancashire
- Position: Inside forward

Senior career*
Years	Team	Apps	(Gls)
- Oswaldtwistle Rovers
1903–1905	Manchester United	8	(2)
1905–1906	Brighton & Hove Albion	27	(7)
1906	Aston Villa	0	(0)
1906–1907	Bradford City	28	(7)
1907	Luton Town		
1907–1909	Chesterfield	44	(13)
1909–1910	Hyde		
1910	Preston North End	0	(0)
- Newport County
- Mardy
- * Club domestic league appearances and goals

Proctor Ratcliffe Hall (26 December 1882 – 2 October 1957) was an English footballer. His regular position was as a forward. He was born in Blackburn. He played for various clubs, including Brighton & Hove Albion, Bradford City, Chesterfield and Manchester United.
