= George Lyons (footballer) =

English footballer

George Lyons (born April 1884) was an English footballer. His regular position was as a forward. He was born in Salford, Lancashire. He played for Black Lane Temperance, Oldham Athletic, and Manchester United.
