= Dick Wombwell =

English footballer

Personal information
- Full name: Richard Wombwell
- Date of birth: 1877
- Place of birth: Nottingham, England
- Date of death: 1943 (aged 65–66)
- Position: Winger

Youth career
- Bulwell

Senior career*
Years	Team	Apps	(Gls)
189?–1899	Ilkeston Town		
1899–1902	Derby County	85	(17)
1902–1904	Bristol City	92	(19)
1904–1906	Manchester United	47	(3)
1906–1907	Hearts	10	(1)
1907–1908	Brighton & Hove Albion	20	(3)
1907–1908	Blackburn Rovers	15	(1)
1906–1907	Ilkeston United	?	(?)
Total		269	(44)
- * Club domestic league appearances and goals

Richard Wombwell (1877–1943) was an English footballer. His regular position was as a forward. He was born in Nottingham, Nottinghamshire. He played for Bulwell, Ilkeston Town, Derby County, Bristol City, Manchester United, Heart of Midlothian, Brighton & Hove Albion, Blackburn Rovers and Ilkeston United. The highlight of his career came at Brighton when he scored the winning goal in a famous giant killing of Preston North End in 1908.
