= Alex Robertson (Scottish footballer) =

Scottish footballer

Alexander Robertson (born 1878; year of death unknown) was a Scottish footballer, whose regular position was as a half-back. He played for Hibernian, Manchester United, and Fair City Athletic. Robertson won the 1902 Scottish Cup and the 1903 Scottish league championship with Hibs, and was transferred to Manchester United at the end of the 1902–03 season. He made 33 appearances for United in the Football League from 1903 to 1906, scoring one goal.
