= Jack Allan (footballer, born 1883) =

English footballer

John Thomas Allan (born 16 January 1883) was an English footballer. His regular position was as a forward. He was born in South Shields, County Durham. He played for Bishop Auckland and Manchester United.
