= Billy Morgan (footballer, born 1878) =

English footballer

Personal information
- Full name: William Henry Morgan
- Date of birth: 1878
- Place of birth: Barrow in Furness, England
- Date of death: 1939 (aged 60–61)
- Place of death: Manchester, England
- Height: 5 ft 10 in (1.78 m)
- Position: Half back

Senior career*
Years	Team	Apps	(Gls)
- Horwich
1897–1903	Newton Heath	143	(6)
1903	Bolton Wanderers	3	(0)
- Watford
1904–1906	Leicester Fosse	66	(9)
- New Brompton
- Newton Heath Athletic
1910-1911	Ton Pentre F.C.		
- * Club domestic league appearances and goals

William Henry Morgan (1878–1939) was an English footballer who played as a half back.

Born in Barrow in Furness, Lancashire, the son of John Morgan and Mary (Lewis), he began his football career with Horwich F.C. In January 1897, he was sold to Newton Heath, making his debut appearance against Darwen on 2 March 1897. He was one of the team during the first season after Newton Heath became Manchester United. During his time with the club, he made 152 appearances (all in Division 2) and scored seven goals (six in Division 2 games, one in an FA Cup match).

He transferred to join Bolton Wanderers in March 1903 and went on to play for Watford, Leicester Fosse, New Brompton and Newton Heath Athletic. On 22 Oct 1910 he made his debut for Ton Pentre F.C. in South Wales and is featured in a number of newspaper articles. It appears he played for one season.

By the time he joined up for the First World War (being assigned to the 20th Service Battalion, Manchester Regiment), Morgan was working as a cleaner but the fact that he still enjoyed his football is clear from the notes in his army pension records when he was discharged in February 1915 as being "[unlikely] to become an efficient soldier". The reason given was that he had "an old football injury [and had been injured] once again last Saturday the 28th (February) playing football."

Morgan married Mary Alice Barnett in 1900 and the couple had two sons and a daughter, all born in Newton Heath, Manchester. He died in Manchester on 5 June 1939, at the age of 61. His wife died in 1954 aged 77 years.
