= Dick Duckworth (footballer, born 1882) =

English footballer

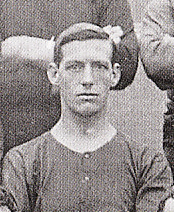

Personal information
- Full name: Richard Hargreaves Duckworth
- Date of birth: 14 September 1882
- Place of birth: Collyhurst, Manchester, England
- Date of death: Q3 1965
- Position: Right half

Youth career
- Stretford
- Manchester United

Senior career*
Years	Team	Apps	(Gls)
1903–1914	Manchester United	225	(11)

International career
	Football League	5	(?)
- * Club domestic league appearances and goals

Richard Hargreaves Duckworth (14 September 1882 – Q3 1965) was an English footballer who played as a wing half for Manchester United, with whom he won the Football League twice and the FA Cup once.

== Career ==
Born in Manchester, he played for Smedley Road School and as a youth player for Harpurhey Wesleyan Juniors, Rossall Mission and Stretford. His first professional contract was with Newton Heath Athletic, who paid him 7 shillings and sixpence a week. As a centre-forward, he scored twice against the Manchester United reserves, and he was signed by the club in October 1903. He scored on his debut, a 4–2 win over Gainsborough Trinity on 19 December 1903. Although he played at right-half in the match, it was not until after a reserve team derby against Manchester City on Christmas Day 1903 that he was considered for the position on a regular basis. In 1904–05, he scored six goals in eight league appearances, his best goal return in a season.

By the 1906–07 season, Duckworth became Manchester United's regular right-half, forming an effective partnership with Charlie Roberts and Alex Bell. The following year, the club won their first major honour, the First Division title, and followed it up with the FA Cup a year later and another league title in 1911. In total, Duckworth scored 11 goals in 254 appearances for Manchester United. A severe knee injury meant he played his final game for the club against Middlesbrough on 15 November 1913, though he remained on their books until 1915. He was also part of a Football Association representative team on a tour of South Africa in 1910, and made five appearances for the Football League XI.

== Personal life ==
After his retirement, Duckworth became a pub licensee, operating the Queen's Arms in Manchester as well as others in Bury, Royton, Castleton, Edenfield and Bacup. In 1949, while working in Edenfield, his 1909 FA Cup winner's medal, which he had lost 20 years earlier, was found in a pile of rubble at a hotel he had once managed. His death was registered in Rochdale in the third quarter of 1965. His son, also called Dick, was also a professional footballer who was on the books of Manchester United before playing in the Football League for Chesterfield, Rotherham United and York City; he later managed York, as well as Stockport County, Darlington and Scunthorpe United.

== Career statistics ==
Club	Season	League		FA Cup		Other		Total	
Club	Season	Apps	Goals	Apps	Goals	Apps	Goals	Apps	Goals
Manchester United	1903–04	1	1	0	0	0	0	1	1
Manchester United	1904–05	8	6	0	0	0	0	8	6
Manchester United	1905–06	10	0	0	0	0	0	10	0
Manchester United	1906–07	28	2	2	0	0	0	30	2
Manchester United	1907–08	35	0	3	0	2	0	40	0
Manchester United	1908–09	33	0	6	0	0	0	39	0
Manchester United	1909–10	29	0	1	0	0	0	30	0
Manchester United	1910–11	22	2	3	0	0	0	25	2
Manchester United	1911–12	26	0	6	0	1	0	33	0
Manchester United	1912–13	24	0	5	0	0	0	29	0
Manchester United	1913–14	9	0	0	0	0	0	9	0
Manchester United	Total	225	11	26	0	3	0	254	11

== Honours ==
=== Club ===
Manchester United

- First Division (2): 1907–08, 1910–11
- FA Cup (1): 1908–09
