= Tommy Blackstock =

Scottish footballer

Personal information
- Date of birth: 1882
- Place of birth: Kirkcaldy, Fife, Scotland
- Date of death: 8 April 1907 (aged 24–25)
- Position: Defender

Thomas Blackstock (1882 – 8 April 1907) was a Scottish footballer who played as a defender. He was born in Kirkcaldy and played for the Dunniker Rangers, Manchester United, Blue Bell, Raith Rovers, Leith Athletic, and Cowdenbeath. On 8 April 1907, he died on the field while playing for Manchester United against St. Helens after sustaining a head injury and collapsing when heading the ball.

A grandson of Charlie Roberts has stated that it was Blackstock's death, and the lack of support for his family, which led Roberts and teammate Billy Meredith to form the Association of Football Players' and Trainers' Union.

== See also ==
- List of association footballers who died while playing
