= Dick Holden =

English footballer (1885–1971)

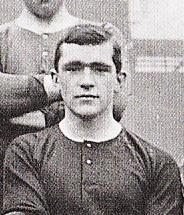

Personal information
- Full name: Richard Holden
- Date of birth: 12 June 1885
- Place of birth: Middleton, Lancashire, England
- Date of death: 12 January 1971 (aged 85)
- Place of death: Stockport, Cheshire
- Height: 5 ft 10 in (1.78 m)
- Position: Full back

Youth career
- Parkfield Central
- 1903–1904: Tonge
- Manchester United

Senior career*
Years	Team	Apps	(Gls)
1904–1913	Manchester United	106	(0)
Total		106	(0)
- * Club domestic league appearances and goals

Richard Holden (12 June 1885 – 12 January 1971) was an English footballer who played at right-back. He started playing football at Parkfield Central as a forward. He then joined Tonge, where he started playing as a full back. In May 1904, Holden joined Manchester United, and spent most of his first season at United in the Reserves. In the season 1905-06, an injury to Bob Bonthron allowed Holden to play for the first-team. In 1908, he suffered a knee injury, and had to go for an operation.

After 117 appearances for the club and no goals, he left United in May 1914 and joined the Royal Air Force, serving in the First World War that began three months later. When the war ended in November 1918, Holden did not resume his career as a footballer.
