= Alex Downie (footballer) =

Scottish footballer

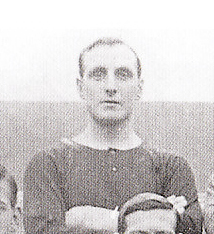

Personal information
- Full name: Alexander Leck Brown Downie
- Date of birth: 8 October 1876
- Place of birth: Glasgow, Scotland
- Date of death: 9 December 1953 (aged 77)
- Height: 5 ft 9 in (1.75 m)
- Position: Wing half

Youth career
- ?–1898: Glasgow Perthshire

Senior career*
Years	Team	Apps	(Gls)
1898–1899	Third Lanark	4	(0)
1899–1900	Bristol City		
1900–1902	Swindon Town	57	(2)
1902–1909	Manchester United	172	(12)
1909–1911	Oldham Athletic	48	(0)
1911–1914	Crewe Alexandra (player-coach)		
1914–1915	Nelson		
Total		281	(14)
- * Club domestic league appearances and goals

Alexander Leck Brown Downie (8 October 1876 – 9 December 1953) was a Scottish footballer who played as a wing half. He was born in Glasgow, and played for Glasgow Perthshire and Third Lanark, before moving to England to play for Bristol City in the 1890s. He then joined Swindon Town before moving to Manchester United in October 1902.

He was able to play in all three half-back positions, and thus earned a regular first-team spot at Old Trafford even after being replaced by Dick Duckworth. He made ten appearances in 1907–08 as the Red Devils won the Football League championship and played in 23 of the league fixtures of the following season but did not take any part in the two-legged 1908 FA Charity Shield at its start, nor in the 1909 FA Cup final at its end. In 1909, after scoring 14 goals in 191 appearances for United, he moved to Oldham Athletic. In the 1909–10 season, he skippered the Latics to promotion to the First Division. He later played for Crewe Alexandra and Nelson.
