= Tommy Arkesden =

English footballer

Tom Arkesden
Personal information
- Full name: Thomas Arthur Arkesden
- Date of birth: July 1878
- Place of birth: Warwick, England
- Date of death: 18 June 1921 (aged 42)
- Height: 1.80 m (5 ft 11 in)
- Position: Inside forward

Senior career*
Years	Team	Apps	(Gls)
1895–1897	Burton Wanderers	25	(5)
1898–1901	Derby County	50	(14)
1901–1903	Burton United	53	(26)
1903–1907	Manchester United	70	(28)
1907–1908	Gainsborough Trinity	6	(1)
Total		204	(74)
- * Club domestic league appearances and goals

Thomas Arthur Arkesden (July 1878 – 18 June 1921) was an English footballer who played as a forward. Born in Warwick, Arkesden played for Burton Wanderers, Derby County, and Burton United, before joining Manchester United for £150 on 2 February 1903. In 1907, he was transferred to Gainsborough Trinity. In 79 matches for Manchester United, he scored 33 goals. Thomas died from tuberculosis on the 18th June 1921 at the age of 42 he was buried at Weaste Cemetery in Salford on the 24th June 1921
