= Harry Moger =

English footballer

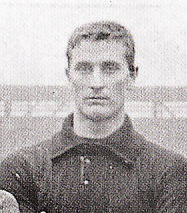

Personal information
- Full name: George Henry Moger
- Date of birth: September 1878
- Place of birth: Southampton, England
- Date of death: 16 June 1927 (aged 48)
- Place of death: London, Middlesex England
- Height: 6 ft 2 in (1.88 m)
- Position: Goalkeeper

Youth career
- Forest Swifts

Senior career*
Years	Team	Apps	(Gls)
1898–1900	Freemantle		
1900–1903	Southampton	14	(0)
1903–1912	Manchester United	242	(0)
- * Club domestic league appearances and goals

George Henry Moger (September 1878 – 16 June 1927) was an English football goalkeeper.

== Playing career ==
Born in Southampton, Moger started his career with local side Forest Swifts, before joining Southampton St. Marys' main local rivals, Freemantle in 1898. In 1899 he was suspended for two months due to his having played amateur football for Forest Swifts whilst registered as a professional with Freemantle.

=== Southampton ===
He joined Southampton in the summer of 1900, but spent most of his time at Southampton as understudy to the England international 'keeper, Jack Robinson. Tall and lean, Moger was particularly useful in high-ball situations when he could come off his goal line to punch the ball clear. Robinson's dominance of the 'keeper's position restricted Moger to 14 Southern League appearances in his three years at The Dell.

=== Manchester United ===
In May 1903, he was sold to Manchester United who had spotted his potential when at Southampton. He would stay with United until 1912 when he retired. During his Manchester United career, he made 266 appearances, and helped United to the Football League titles in 1907–08 and 1910–11, and the FA Cup in 1909.

== Life after football ==
Moger retired as a player in 1912 and then began a new career as an accountant and commission agent. He died at the age of 48 in a Belgrave Road nursing home in Middlesex on 16 June 1927. He was buried in Manchester four days later, on 20 June 1927.

== First World War ==
Moger served as a gunner in the Royal Garrison Artillery during the First World War.

== Honours ==
Manchester United

- Football League First Division: 1907–08, 1910–11
- FA Cup: 1908–09
