= Alex Bell =

South African-born Scottish soccer player (1882–1934)

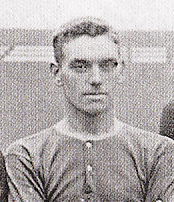

Personal information
- Full name: Alexander Bell
- Date of birth: 20 October 1882
- Place of birth: Cape Town, Cape Colony
- Date of death: 30 November 1934 (aged 52)
- Place of death: Chorlton-cum-Hardy, England
- Position: Wing half

Senior career*
Years	Team	Apps	(Gls)
1900–1903	Ayr Parkhouse		
1903–1913	Manchester United	278	(10)
1913–1920	Blackburn Rovers	11	(0)
1920–1922	Clackmannan	18	(1)
1922–1923	Royal Albert		

International career
1912	Scotland	1	(0)
- * Club domestic league appearances and goals

Alexander Bell (20 October 1882 – 30 November 1934) was a footballer who played as a wing half. His professional career was mostly spent in England, where he won trophies with Manchester United and Blackburn Rovers. Born in South Africa, he was largely raised in Scotland and made one appearance for the Scotland national team.

== Club career ==
Born in Cape Town, Cape Colony, to Scottish parents, Bell began his professional football career as a centre-forward with various clubs in Ayr, including Ayr Spring Vale, Ayr Westerlea and Ayr Parkhouse. While with Ayr Parkhouse (then still to join the Scottish Football League), Bell was spotted by former Newton Heath half-back Will Davidson, who reported his findings back to Manchester United.

United paid Ayr Parkhouse £700 for Bell in January 1903. At this stage, it was less than a year since United's formation in place of the bankrupt Newton Heath club, and they were still in the Football League Second Division, from which they won promotion in 1906.

He struggled to make an impact in the Manchester United first team as a centre-forward, making just 11 appearances in his first two years at the club. However, United suffered an injury crisis at half-back in 1904, and Bell was called upon to step in. As it happened, Bell excelled in his new position, and became the club's regular left-half, forming an unbreakable trio with Charlie Roberts and Dick Duckworth.

After scoring 10 goals in 309 appearances, and winning two First Division titles (1907–08 and 1910–11) and one FA Cup (1909), Bell was sold to Blackburn Rovers for a fee of £1,000 in July 1913. He played only a few matches for Blackburn before the outbreak of the First World War, and signed for Clackmannan in 1921. He played there for two seasons and spent one with Royal Albert, before retiring as a player and joining the coaching staff at Coventry City. His last job in football was at Manchester City, where he was employed as coach and trainer from 1925 until his death in November 1934 at the age of 52.

Bell's name was immortalised by former Manchester United teammate Charlie Roberts, who became a tobacconist after retiring from football, naming a brand of cigarette "Ducrobel" after United's famous half-back trio of Duckworth, Roberts and Bell.

== International career ==
On 16 March 1912, Bell played for Scotland in a 4–1 win against Ireland. It was his only international cap and he was the first Manchester United player to represent Scotland.

== Honours ==
Manchester United

- Football League First Division: 1907–08, 1910–11
- FA Cup: 1909
- FA Charity Shield 1910–11

Blackburn Rovers

- Football League First Division: 1913–14

== See also ==
- List of Scotland international footballers born outside Scotland
