= Billy Griffiths (footballer, born 1876) =

English footballer (1876–1946

Billy Griffiths (16 April 1876 – 26 October 1946) was an English footballer who played as a centre half-back. He joined Newton Heath in February 1899 as a replacement for James McNaught. In the 1903-04 season, he scored 11 goals, becoming joint leading scorer from centre half-back. However, he soon lost his place to Charlie Roberts. Griffiths left Newton Heath, which had been renamed Manchester United in 1902, for Atherton Church House in June 1905, after scoring 30 goals in 175 appearances for United.
