= Bob Bonthron =

Scottish footballer

Personal information
- Full name: Robert Pollock Bonthron
- Date of birth: 14 July 1880
- Place of birth: Burntisland, Scotland
- Date of death: 19 February 1947 (aged 66)
- Place of death: Edinburgh, Scotland
- Height: 5 ft 11 in (1.80 m)
- Position: Right-back

Youth career
- Raith Athletic
- –1900: Burntisland Thistle

Senior career*
Years	Team	Apps	(Gls)
1900–1902	Raith Rovers		
1902–1903	Dundee	0	(0)
1903–1907	Manchester United	119	(3)
1907–1908	Sunderland	23	(1)
1908–1910	Northampton Town	59	(0)
1910–1911	Birmingham	11	(1)
1911–1912	Airdrieonians	5	(0)
1912–1913	Leith Athletic	11	(0)
- * Club domestic league appearances and goals

Robert Pollock Bonthron (14 July 1880 – 19 February 1947) was a Scottish professional footballer who played as a right-back for Manchester United, Sunderland and Birmingham in the Football League.

Bonthron was born in Burntisland, Fife. He played for Raith Rovers and Dundee before joining Manchester United in May 1903. He helped them to promotion to the First Division in the 1905–06 season and made a total of 134 appearances for the club in all competitions, scoring three goals.

Bonthron was a combative player and during the promotion season was at the centre of a serious incident after Manchester United's match at Bradford City. His treatment of Bradford player Jimmy Conlin during the match enraged the crowd, and after the game Bonthron was attacked by home supporters. Criminal charges followed against the perpetrators and a Football Association (FA) inquiry resulted in the temporary closure of Bradford City's Valley Parade ground.

He joined Sunderland in May 1907, playing 24 games, before moving on the following year to Northampton Town, with whom he won the Southern League championship in the 1908–09 season. He spent the 1910–11 season with Birmingham before returning to Scotland with Airdrieonians and Leith Athletic.

== Personal life ==
Bonthron served as a lance corporal in the Gordon Highlanders and the Labour Corps during the First World War.

He was married to Grace Reid. He died at Edinburgh Royal Infirmary, aged 66.

== Honours ==
Raith Rovers

- Northern League: 1901–02
