= Alf Schofield =

English footballer

Alfred John Schofield (born 1873) was an English footballer.

Schofield came to Manchester United in 1900 from Everton as a replacement for William Bryant. He went on to score 35 goals in 179 games for United before retiring in 1906.
