= 1903–04 Manchester City F.C. season =

English football club season

Manchester City F.C.
1903–04 season
- Manager: Tom Maley
- Football League First Division: 2nd
- FA Cup: Winners
- Top goalscorer: League: Billie Gillespie (18 goals); All: Billie Gillespie / Sandy Turnbull (21 goals)
- Highest home attendance: 35,000 vs Middlesbrough (5 March 1904)
- Lowest home attendance: 8,000 vs The Wednesday (28 November 1903)
Home colours

The 1903–04 season was Manchester City F.C.'s thirteenth season of league football and first season back in the top flight of English football. Following their promotion, City made an immediate challenge for the league championship, falling at the last hurdle but finishing creditably second. They did, however, take the FA Cup in the same season, winning their first major trophy of their existence and becoming the 19th winner in the trophy's 33rd year with a 1–0 victory over Bolton Wanderers.

== Football League First Division ==
Pos	Team	Pld	W	D	L	GF	GA	GAv	Pts
1	The Wednesday (C)	34	20	7	7	48	28	1.714	47
2	Manchester City	34	19	6	9	71	45	1.578	44
3	Everton	34	19	5	10	59	32	1.844	43
4	Newcastle United	34	18	6	10	58	45	1.289	42
5	Aston Villa	34	17	7	10	70	48	1.458	41

Source: World Football
Rules for classification: 1) Points; 2) Goal average; 3) Goals scored
(C) Champions

=== Results summary ===
Overall								Home						Away					
Pld	W	D	L	GF	GA	GAv	Pts	W	D	L	GF	GA	Pts	W	D	L	GF	GA	Pts
34	19	6	9	71	45	1.578	44	10	4	3	35	19	24	9	2	6	36	26	20

Source: rsssf.com

=== Reports ===
Date	Opponents	H / A	Venue	Result F – A	Scorers	Attendance
5 September 1903	Stoke	A	Victoria Ground	2 – 1	Livingstone, ? (o.g.)	16,000
12 September 1903	Derby County	H	Hyde Road	2 – 1	Turnbull (2)	28,000
19 September 1903	Wolverhampton Wanderers	H	Hyde Road	4 – 1	Meredith, Turnbull (2), Booth	25,000
26 September 1903	Notts County	A	Trent Bridge	3 – 0	Hynds, Meredith, Pearson	15,000
3 October 1903	Sheffield United	H	Hyde Road	0 – 1		28,000
10 October 1903	Newcastle United	A	St James' Park	0 – 1		19,730
17 October 1903	Aston Villa	H	Hyde Road	1 – 0	Gillespie	30,000
24 October 1903	Middlesbrough	A	Ayresome Park	0 – 6		14,000
31 October 1903	Liverpool	H	Hyde Road	3 – 2	Booth, Turnbull, Gillespie	25,000
7 November 1903	Bury	A	Gigg Lane	3 – 1	Gillespie (2), Meredith	19,371
14 November 1903	Blackburn Rovers	H	Hyde Road	1 – 0	Meredith	20,000
21 November 1903	Nottingham Forest	A	City Ground	3 – 0	Frost, Hynds, Gillespie	12,000
28 November 1903	The Wednesday	H	Hyde Road	1 – 1	Livingstone	8,000
5 December 1903	Sunderland	A	Roker Park	1 – 1	Hynds	18,000
12 December 1903	West Bromwich Albion	H	Hyde Road	6 – 3	Meredith (2), Gillespie (2), Turnbull, Livingstone	14,000
19 December 1903	Small Heath	A	Muntz Street	3 – 0	Turnbull (2), Gillespie	12,000
26 December 1903	Everton	H	Hyde Road	1 – 3	Gillespie	28,000
28 December 1903	Sheffield United	A	Bramall Lane	3 – 5	Gillespie (2), Threlfall	35,000
1 January 1904	Middlesbrough	H	Hyde Road	1 – 1	Meredith	30,000
2 January 1904	Stoke	H	Hyde Road	2 – 2	Frost, Turnbull	16,000
9 January 1904	Derby County	A	Baseball Ground	3 – 2	Gillespie (2), Meredith	12,000
23 January 1904	Notts County	H	Hyde Road	3 – 0	Gillespie, Booth, Frost	15,000
13 February 1904	Aston Villa	A	Villa Park	1 – 0	Gillespie	16,000
27 February 1904	Liverpool	A	Anfield	2 – 2	Gillespie, Hynds	20,000
12 March 1904	Blackburn Rovers	A	Ewood Park	5 – 2	Meredith (2), Dennison (2), Turnbull	12,000
21 March 1904	Wolverhampton Wanderers	A	Molineux	6 – 1	Livingstone (2), Gillespie (2), Meredith, Turnbull	6,000
26 March 1904	The Wednesday	A	Owlerton	0 – 1		25,000
1 April 1904	Newcastle United	H	Hyde Road	1 – 3	Turnbull	28,000
2 April 1904	Sunderland	H	Hyde Road	2 – 1	Turnbull (2)	15,000
9 April 1904	West Bromwich Albion	A	The Hawthorns	1 – 2	Jones	14,000
11 April 1904	Bury	H	Hyde Road	3 – 0	Turnbull (2), Bannister	10,000
13 April 1904	Nottingham Forest	H	Hyde Road	0 – 0		10,000
16 April 1904	Small Heath	H	Hyde Road	4 – 0	Bannister (2), J. Moffatt (2)	15,000
24 April 1904	Everton	A	Goodison Park	0 – 1		12,000

== FA Cup ==
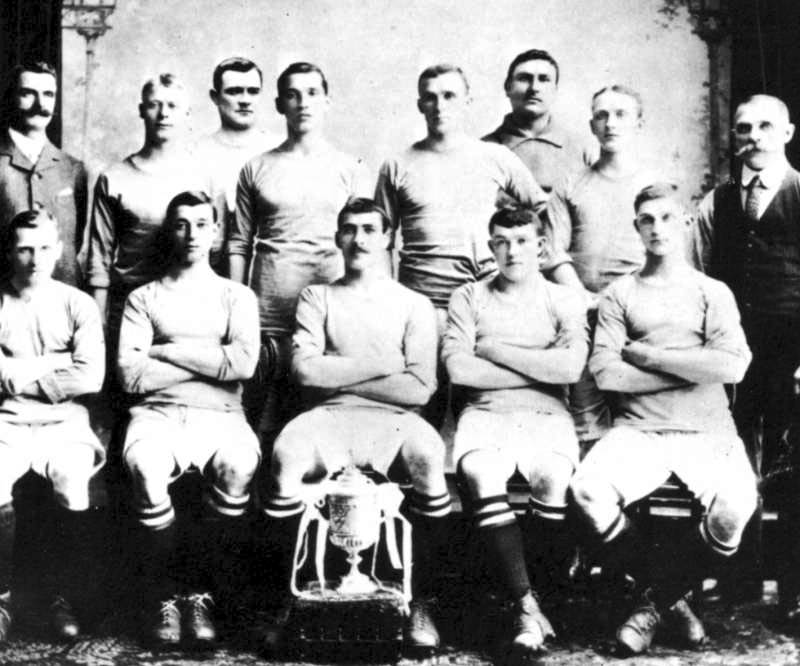
The Manchester City team which won the FA Cup in 1904

Date	Round	Opponents	H / A	Venue	Result F – A	Scorers	Attendance
6 February 1904	First round	Sunderland	H	Hyde Road	3 – 2	Turnbull (2), Gillespie	23,000
20 February 1904	Second round	Woolwich Arsenal	A	Manor Ground	2 – 0	Turnbull, Booth	30,000
5 March 1904	Third round	Middlesbrough	H	Hyde Road	0 – 0		35,000
9 March 1904	Third round replay	Middlesbrough	A	Ayresome Park	3 – 1	Livingstone, Gillespie, Turnbull	33,000
19 March 1904	Semi-final	The Wednesday	N	Goodison Park	3 – 0	Meredith, Gillespie, Turnbull	53,000
23 April 1904	Final	Bolton Wanderers	N	Crystal Palace	1 – 0	Meredith	61,374

== Squad statistics ==
=== Squad ===
Appearances for competitive matches only

Pos.	Name	League		FA Cup		Total	
Pos.	Name	Apps	Goals	Apps	Goals	Apps	Goals
GK	John Edmondson	6	0	1	0	7	0
GK	(England) Jack Hillman	28	0	5	0	33	0
DF	(England) Herbert Burgess	27	0	6	0	33	0
DF	(Scotland) Tommy Hynds	32	4	6	0	38	4
FW	(England) Jimmy Bannister	7	3	0	0	7	3
FW	(England) Frank Booth	24	3	6	1	30	4
FW	(England) Billie Gillespie	24	18	6	3	30	21
FW	(Wales) Lot Jones	1	1	0	0	1	1
FW	(Wales) Billy Meredith	34	11	6	2	40	13
FW	(England) Irvine Thornley	4	0	0	0	4	0
FW	(Scotland) Sandy Turnbull	32	16	6	5	38	21
--	Sam Ashworth	18	0	4	0	22	0
--	Robert Davidson	6	0	0	0	6	0
--	R. Dearden	6	0	0	0	6	0
--	J. Dennison	1	2	0	0	1	2
--	Jimmy Drummond	1	0	0	0	1	0
--	Sammy Frost	30	3	6	0	36	3
--	Billy Holmes	8	0	2	0	10	0
--	Geordie Livingstone	29	5	6	1	35	6
--	Billy Lyon	6	0	0	0	6	0
--	McMahon	27	0	6	0	33	0
--	(Scotland) Willie McOustra	2	0	0	0	2	0
--	Joe Moffatt	4	2	0	0	4	2
--	Frank Norgrove	1	0	0	0	1	0
--	Frank Pearson	3	1	0	0	3	1
--	William Robinson	1	0	0	0	1	0
--	Percy Slater	2	0	0	0	2	0
--	Fred Threlfall	10	1	0	0	10	1

=== Scorers ===
==== All ====
Scorer	Goals
(England) Billie Gillespie	21
(Scotland) Sandy Turnbull	21
(Wales) Billy Meredith	13
Geordie Livingstone	6
(England) Frank Booth	4
(Scotland) Tommy Hynds	4
(England) Jimmy Bannister	3
Sammy Frost	3
J. Dennison	2
Joe Moffatt	2
(Wales) Lot Jones	1
Frank Pearson	1
Fred Threlfall	1

==== League ====
Scorer	Goals
(England) Billie Gillespie	18
(Scotland) Sandy Turnbull	16
(Wales) Billy Meredith	11
Geordie Livingstone	5
(Scotland) Tommy Hynds	4
(England) Jimmy Bannister	3
(England) Frank Booth	3
Sammy Frost	3
J. Dennison	2
Joe Moffatt	2
(Wales) Lot Jones	1
Frank Pearson	1
Fred Threlfall	1

==== FA Cup ====
Scorer	Goals
(Scotland) Sandy Turnbull	5
(England) Billie Gillespie	3
(Wales) Billy Meredith	2
(England) Frank Booth	1
Geordie Livingstone	1

== See also ==
- Manchester City F.C. seasons
