= 1902–03 Manchester City F.C. season =

English football club season

Manchester City F.C.
1902–03 season
- Manager: Tom Maley
- Football League Second Division: 1st (promoted)
- FA Cup: First round
- Top goalscorer: League: Gillespie (30 goals); All: Gillespie (30 goals)
- Highest home attendance: 35,000 vs Small Heath (10 January 1903)
- Lowest home attendance: 8,000 vs Glossop (22 November 1902); 8,000 vs Barnsley (24 November 1902); 8,000 vs Blackpool (11 April 1903)
Home colours

The 1902–1903 season was Manchester City F.C.'s twelfth season of league football and first season back in the Second Division of the Football League following relegation. Determined to return to Division One, City finished the season at the top of the league, with a 25–5–4 record, gaining its second minor league trophy.

During the season, Manchester City set a league record with 95 goals, 30 of which were scored by Billie Gillespie and 22 of which were scored by Billy Meredith. It was also their best defensive record in the Football League, conceding only 29 goals over 34 matches.City tied the club record for fewest away defeats (4), previously set during the 1898–1899 season.

== Football League Second Division ==
| Pos | Team | Pld | W | D | L | GF | GA | GAv | Pts | Promotion or relegation |
|---|---|---|---|---|---|---|---|---|---|---|
| 1 | Manchester City (C, P) | 34 | 25 | 4 | 5 | 95 | 29 | 3.276 | 54 | Promotion to the First Division |
| 2 | Small Heath (P) | 34 | 24 | 3 | 7 | 74 | 36 | 2.056 | 51 | Promotion to the First Division |
| 3 | Woolwich Arsenal | 34 | 20 | 8 | 6 | 66 | 30 | 2.200 | 48 | |
| 4 | Bristol City | 34 | 17 | 8 | 9 | 59 | 38 | 1.553 | 42 | |
| 5 | Manchester United | 34 | 15 | 8 | 11 | 53 | 38 | 1.395 | 38 | |

(C) Champions; (P) Promoted

=== Results summary ===
| Overall | | | | | | | | Home | | | | | | Away | | | | | |
| Pld | W | D | L | GF | GA | GAv | Pts | W | D | L | GF | GA | Pts | W | D | L | GF | GA | Pts |
|---|---|---|---|---|---|---|---|---|---|---|---|---|---|---|---|---|---|---|---|
| 34 | 25 | 4 | 5 | 95 | 29 | 3.276 | 54 | 15 | 1 | 1 | 64 | 15 | 31 | 10 | 3 | 4 | 31 | 14 | 23 |

Source: rsssf.com

=== Reports ===
| Date | Opponents | H / A | Venue | Result F – A | Scorers | Attendance |
|---|---|---|---|---|---|---|
| 6 September 1902 | Lincoln City | H | Hyde Road | 3 – 1 | McOustra (2), Bevan | 16,000 |
| 13 September 1902 | Small Heath | A | Muntz Street | 0 – 4 | | 12,000 |
| 20 September 1902 | Leicester Fosse | H | Hyde Road | 3 – 1 | Meredith, Gillespie, ? (o.g.) | 12,000 |
| 27 September 1902 | Chesterfield Town | A | Recreation Ground | 1 – 0 | Meredith | 15,000 |
| 4 October 1902 | Burnley | A | Turf Moor | 1 – 1 | Miller | 4,000 |
| 11 October 1902 | Preston North End | H | Hyde Road | 1 – 0 | Gillespie | 16,000 |
| 18 October 1902 | Burslem Port Vale | A | Athletic Ground | 4 – 1 | Gillespie (2), Meredith, Drummond | 5,000 |
| 22 October 1902 | Gainsborough Trinity | A | The Northolme | 3 – 0 | Gillespie (2), Miller | 4,000 |
| 25 October 1902 | Barnsley | H | Hyde Road | Abandoned; 5 – 0 | Meredith, Gillespie, Drummond, Threlfall, ? (o.g.) | 16,000 |
| 1 November 1902 | Woolwich Arsenal | A | Manor Ground | 0 – 1 | | 11,000 |
| 8 November 1902 | Burton United | H | Hyde Road | 2 – 0 | Gillespie, McOustra | 13,000 |
| 15 November 1902 | Bristol City | A | St John's Lane | 2 – 3 | Turnbull, Drummond | 13,000 |
| 22 November 1902 | Glossop | H | Hyde Road | 5 – 2 | Gillespie (3), Turnbull, ? (o.g.) | 8,000 |
| 24 November 1902 | Barnsley | H | Hyde Road | 3 – 2 | Gillespie (2), Meredith | 8,000 |
| 6 December 1902 | Stockport County | H | Hyde Road | 5 – 0 | Meredith (2), Turnbull (2), Gillespie | 12,000 |
| 13 December 1902 | Blackpool | A | Bloomfield Road | 3 – 0 | Meredith, Turnbull, Gillespie | 5,000 |
| 20 December 1902 | Woolwich Arsenal | H | Hyde Road | 4 – 1 | Gillespie (3), Turnbull | 25,000 |
| 25 December 1902 | Manchester United | A | Bank Street | 1 – 1 | Bannister | 40,000 |
| 26 December 1902 | Preston North End | A | Deepdale | 2 – 0 | Gillespie, Drummond | 10,000 |
| 27 December 1902 | Doncaster Rovers | A | Intake Ground | 2 – 1 | Hynds, Gillespie | 30,000 |
| 1 January 1903 | Doncaster Rovers | H | Hyde Road | 4 – 1 | Bannister (2), Meredith, Turnbull | 25,000 |
| 3 January 1903 | Lincoln City | A | Sincil Bank | 0 – 1 | | 6,000 |
| 10 January 1903 | Small Heath | H | Hyde Road | Abandoned after 40 minutes 0 – 0 | | 35,000 |
| 17 January 1903 | Leicester Fosse | A | Filbert Street | 1 – 1 | Threlfall | 7,000 |
| 24 January 1903 | Chesterfield Town | H | Hyde Road | 4 – 2 | Meredith (3), Turnbull | 15,000 |
| 31 January 1903 | Burnley | H | Hyde Road | 6 – 0 | Meredith (2), Gillespie (2), Threlfall, Bannister | 16,000 |
| 14 February 1903 | Burslem Port Vale | H | Hyde Road | 7 – 1 | Bannister (2), Gillespie (2), Turnbull, Meredith, McOustra | 12,000 |
| 23 February 1903 | Small Heath | H | Hyde Road | 4 – 0 | Meredith (2), Gillespie, Threlfall | 20,000 |
| 28 February 1903 | Gainsborough Trinity | H | Hyde Road | 9 – 0 | Bannister (3), Gillespie (2), Turnbull (2), Meredith, Threlfall | 15,000 |
| 7 March 1903 | Burton United | A | Peel Croft | 5 – 0 | Bannister (2), Gillespie (2), Meredith | 5,000 |
| 14 March 1903 | Bristol City | H | Hyde Road | 2 – 2 | Meredith, Threlfall | 20,000 |
| 21 March 1903 | Glossop | A | North Road | 1 – 0 | Bannister | 7,000 |
| 4 April 1903 | Stockport County | A | Edgeley Park | 2 – 0 | Gillespie, Turnbull | 10,000 |
| 10 April 1903 | Manchester United | H | Hyde Road | 0 – 2 | | 30,000 |
| 11 April 1903 | Blackpool | H | Hyde Road | 2 – 0 | Meredith (2) | 8,000 |
| 14 April 1903 | Barnsley | A | Oakwell | 3 – 0 | Meredith, Bannister, Gillespie | 5,000 |

== FA Cup ==
| Date | Round | Opponents | H / A | Venue | Result F – A | Scorers | Attendance |
|---|---|---|---|---|---|---|---|
| 7 February 1903 | First round | Preston North End | A | Deepdale | 1 – 3 | Turnbull | 8,000 |

== Squad statistics ==
=== Squad ===
Appearances for competitive matches only

| Pos. | Name | League | | FA Cup | | Abandoned | | Total | |
| Pos. | Name | Appearances | Goals | Appearances | Goals | Appearances | Goals | Appearances | Goals |
|---|---|---|---|---|---|---|---|---|---|
| GK | John Edmondson | 3 | 0 | 0 | 0 | 0 | 0 | 3 | 0 |
| GK | (England) Jack Hillman | 31 | 0 | 1 | 0 | 2 | 0 | 34 | 0 |
| DF | (Scotland) Tommy Hynds | 31 | 0 | 1 | 0 | 2 | 0 | 34 | 0 |
| FW | (England) Jimmy Bannister | 21 | 0 | 1 | 0 | 1 | 0 | 23 | 0 |
| FW | (England) Frank Booth | 9 | 0 | 0 | 0 | 0 | 0 | 9 | 0 |
| FW | (England) Billie Gillespie | 32 | 0 | 1 | 0 | 2 | 0 | 35 | 0 |
| FW | (Wales) Billy Meredith | 34 | 0 | 1 | 0 | 2 | 0 | 37 | 0 |
| FW | (Scotland) John Miller | 8 | 0 | 0 | 0 | 1 | 0 | 9 | 0 |
| FW | (Scotland) Sandy Turnbull | 22 | 0 | 1 | 0 | 1 | 0 | 24 | 0 |
| -- | Fred Bevan | 6 | 0 | 1 | 0 | 0 | 0 | 7 | 0 |
| -- | Robert Davidson | 26 | 0 | 0 | 0 | 2 | 0 | 28 | 0 |
| -- | R. Dearden | 3 | 0 | 0 | 0 | 0 | 0 | 3 | 0 |
| -- | Jimmy Drummond | 14 | 0 | 0 | 0 | 1 | 0 | 15 | 0 |
| -- | Sammy Frost | 30 | 0 | 1 | 0 | 1 | 0 | 32 | 0 |
| -- | Billy Holmes | 11 | 0 | 1 | 0 | 0 | 0 | 12 | 0 |
| -- | Jamie Hosie | 3 | 0 | 0 | 0 | 0 | 0 | 3 | 0 |
| -- | McMahon | 17 | 0 | 0 | 0 | 1 | 0 | 18 | 0 |
| -- | (Scotland) Willie McOustra | 32 | 0 | 0 | 0 | 2 | 0 | 34 | 0 |
| -- | Bobby Moffatt | 1 | 0 | 0 | 0 | 1 | 0 | 2 | 0 |
| -- | Willie Orr | 13 | 0 | 1 | 0 | 1 | 0 | 15 | 0 |
| -- | Percy Slater | 2 | 0 | 0 | 0 | 0 | 0 | 2 | 0 |
| -- | Fred Threlfall | 25 | 0 | 1 | 0 | 2 | 0 | 28 | 0 |

=== Scorers ===
==== All (incl. abandoned) ====
| Scorer | Goals |
|---|---|
| (England) Billie Gillespie | 30 |
| (Wales) Billy Meredith | 22 |
| (England) Jimmy Bannister | 13 |
| (Scotland) Sandy Turnbull | 13 |
| Fred Threlfall | 5 |
| (Scotland) Willie McOustra | 4 |
| Jimmy Drummond | 3 |
| (Scotland) John Miller | 2 |
| Fred Bevan | 1 |
| (Scotland) Tommy Hynds | 1 |

==== League ====
| Scorer | Goals |
|---|---|
| (England) Billie Gillespie | 29 |
| (Wales) Billy Meredith | 21 |
| (England) Jimmy Bannister | 13 |
| (Scotland) Sandy Turnbull | 12 |
| (Scotland) Willie McOustra | 4 |
| Fred Threlfall | 4 |
| Jimmy Drummond | 2 |
| (Scotland) John Miller | 2 |
| Fred Bevan | 1 |
| (Scotland) Tommy Hynds | 1 |

==== FA Cup ====
| Scorer | Goals |
|---|---|
| (Scotland) Sandy Turnbull | 1 |

==== Abandoned ====
| Scorer | Goals |
|---|---|
| Jimmy Drummond | 1 |
| (England) Billie Gillespie | 1 |
| (Wales) Billy Meredith | 1 |
| Fred Threlfall | 1 |

== See also ==
- Manchester City F.C. seasons
