= 1905–06 Manchester City F.C. season =

English football club season

Manchester City F.C.
1905–06 season
- Manager: Tom Maley
- Football League First Division: 5th
- FA Cup: First round
- Top goalscorer: League: Thornley (21 goals); All: Thornley (21 goals)
- Highest home attendance: 38,000 vs Bolton Wanderers (25 November 1905)
- Lowest home attendance: 3,000 vs Sunderland (21 April 1906)

The 1905–06 season was Manchester City F.C.'s fifteenth season of league football and third consecutive season in the top flight of English football.

At the end of the season, Manchester City were investigated by the FA for allegations of awarding players bonuses, which was at the time against FA regulations. Consequently, the club were found guilty and seventeen players were fined, suspended from football until 1 January 1907 and were banned from representing Man City in future. The club was forced to shed most of its players, including its best performers and early club legends such as Billy Meredith, Sandy Turnbull and Billie Gillespie. Though several players followed guidance and moved to Manchester United (then not a rival but a fellow community club) or other league clubs, Gillespie refused to pay his fine and instead moved to America. In addition to this, manager Tom Maley was banned from football for life, and left the club.

== Football League First Division ==
Pos	Team	Pld	W	D	L	GF	GA	GAv	Pts
3	The Wednesday	38	18	8	12	63	52	1.212	44
4	Newcastle United	38	18	7	13	74	48	1.542	43
5	Manchester City	38	19	5	14	73	54	1.352	43
6	Bolton Wanderers	38	17	7	14	81	67	1.209	41
7	Birmingham	38	17	7	14	65	59	1.102	41

Source: World Football
Rules for classification: 1) Points; 2) Goal average; 3) Goals scored

=== Results summary ===
Overall								Home						Away					
Pld	W	D	L	GF	GA	GAv	Pts	W	D	L	GF	GA	Pts	W	D	L	GF	GA	Pts
38	19	5	14	73	54	1.352	43	11	2	6	46	23	24	8	3	8	27	31	19

Source: rsssf.com

=== Reports ===
Date	Opponents	H / A	Venue	Result F – A	Scorers	Attendance
2 September 1905	The Wednesday	A	Owlerton	0 – 1		25,000
6 September 1905	Newcastle United	A	St James' Park	2 – 2	Thornley, Dorsett	22,000
9 September 1905	Nottingham Forest	H	Hyde Road	5 – 0	Dorsett (2), Livingstone, Jones, Booth	16,000
16 September 1905	Wolverhampton Wanderers	H	Hyde Road	4 – 0	Jones (2), Livingstone, Booth	20,000
23 September 1905	Bury	A	Gigg Lane	4 – 2	Thornley (2), Livingstone, Booth	24,000
30 September 1905	Middlesbrough	H	Hyde Road	4 – 0	Dorsett (2), Jones, McMahon	20,000
7 October 1905	Preston North End	A	Deepdale	0 – 2		10,000
21 October 1905	Aston Villa	A	Villa Park	1 – 2	Livingstone	30,000
28 October 1905	Liverpool	H	Hyde Road	0 – 1		30,000
4 November 1905	Sheffield United	A	Bramall Lane	3 – 1	Dorsett, Thornley, Jones	8,000
11 November 1905	Notts County	H	Hyde Road	5 – 1	Thornley (2), Turnbull, Dorsett, Buchan	14,000
18 November 1905	Stoke	A	Victoria Ground	0 – 0		8,000
25 November 1905	Bolton Wanderers	H	Hyde Road	3 – 1	Thornley, Jones, Booth	38,000
2 December 1905	Woolwich Arsenal	A	Manor Ground	0 – 2		15,000
9 December 1905	Blackburn Rovers	H	Hyde Road	1 – 1	Dorsett	16,000
16 December 1905	Sunderland	A	Roker Park	0 – 2		15,000
23 December 1905	Birmingham	H	Hyde Road	4 – 1	Turnbull (2), Livingstone, ? (o.g.)	15,000
25 December 1905	Derby County	A	Baseball Ground	2 – 1	Dorsett, Frost	12,000
26 December 1905	Newcastle United	H	Hyde Road	1 – 4	Burgess	35,000
30 December 1905	The Wednesday	H	Hyde Road	2 – 1	Banks, Booth	16,000
1 January 1906	Everton	H	Hyde Road	1 – 0	Thornley	25,000
6 January 1906	Nottingham Forest	A	City Ground	1 – 0	Thornley	4,000
20 January 1906	Wolverhampton Wanderers	A	Molineux	3 – 2	Thornley, Livingstone, Booth	5,000
27 January 1906	Bury	H	Hyde Road	5 – 2	Thornley (2), Dorsett, Booth, Turnbull	16,000
10 February 1906	Preston North End	H	Hyde Road	0 – 0		12,000
3 March 1906	Liverpool	A	Anfield	1 – 0	Booth	30,000
10 March 1906	Sheffield United	H	Hyde Road	1 – 2	Bannister	18,000
14 March 1906	Aston Villa	H	Hyde Road	1 – 4	Dorsett	10,000
17 March 1906	Notts County	A	Trent Bridge	0 – 3		12,000
24 March 1906	Stoke	H	Hyde Road	2 – 0	Dorsett, Thornley	8,000
31 March 1906	Bolton Wanderers	A	Burnden Park	3 – 1	Thornley (2), Livingstone	40,000
7 April 1906	Woolwich Arsenal	H	Hyde Road	1 – 2	Dorsett	12,000
13 April 1906	Derby County	H	Hyde Road	1 – 2	Dorsett	15,000
14 April 1906	Blackburn Rovers	A	Ewood Park	1 – 1	Turnbull	12,000
16 April 1906	Everton	A	Goodison Park	3 – 0	Thornley (2), Turnbull	10,000
17 April 1906	Middlesbrough	A	Ayresome Park	1 – 6	J. Moffatt	8,000
21 April 1906	Sunderland	H	Hyde Road	5 – 1	Thornley (3), Whittaker, Bannister	3,000
28 April 1906	Birmingham	A	Muntz Street	2 – 3	Burgess, Thornley	6,000

== FA Cup ==
Date	Round	Opponents	H / A	Venue	Result F – A	Scorers	Attendance
13 January 1906	First round	The Wednesday	A	Owlerton	1 – 4	Bannister	21,352

== Squad statistics ==
=== Squad ===
Appearances for competitive matches only

Pos.	Name	League		FA Cup		Total	
Pos.	Name	Apps	Goals	Apps	Goals	Apps	Goals
GK	John Edmondson	27	0	1	0	28	0
GK	(England) Jack Hillman	11	0	0	0	11	0
DF	(Scotland) James Buchan	29	1	0	0	29	1
DF	(England) Herbert Burgess	32	2	1	0	33	2
DF	(Scotland) Tommy Hynds	33	0	1	0	34	0
MF	(England) George Dorsett	34	15	1	0	35	15
MF	(Scotland) James Young	1	0	0	0	1	0
FW	(England) Jimmy Bannister	11	2	1	1	12	3
FW	(England) Frank Booth	28	7	1	0	29	7
FW	(Wales) Lot Jones	25	6	0	0	25	6
FW	(England) Irvine Thornley	36	21	1	0	37	21
FW	(Scotland) Sandy Turnbull	26	6	0	0	26	6
--	Willie Banks	21	1	1	0	22	1
--	John Christie	5	0	0	0	5	0
--	R. Dearden	4	0	0	0	4	0
--	Sammy Frost	9	1	1	0	10	1
--	Julius Gregory	3	0	0	0	3	0
--	Geordie Livingstone	26	7	1	0	27	7
--	McMahon	25	1	1	0	26	1
--	(Scotland) Willie McOustra	7	0	0	0	7	0
--	Joe Moffatt	3	1	0	0	3	1
--	Frank Norgrove	11	0	0	0	11	0
--	Frank Pearson	1	0	0	0	1	0
--	Alex Steele	4	0	0	0	4	0
--	James Whittaker	6	1	0	0	6	1

=== Scorers ===
==== All ====
Scorer	Goals
(England) Irvine Thornley	21
(England) George Dorsett	15
(England) Frank Booth	7
Geordie Livingstone	7
(Wales) Lot Jones	6
(Scotland) Sandy Turnbull	6
(England) Jimmy Bannister	3
(England) Herbert Burgess	2
Willie Banks	1
(Scotland) James Buchan	1
Sammy Frost	1
McMahon	1
Joe Moffatt	1
James Whittaker	1

==== League ====
Scorer	Goals
(England) Irvine Thornley	21
(England) George Dorsett	15
(England) Frank Booth	7
Geordie Livingstone	7
(Wales) Lot Jones	6
(Scotland) Sandy Turnbull	6
(England) Jimmy Bannister	2
(England) Herbert Burgess	2
Willie Banks	1
(Scotland) James Buchan	1
Sammy Frost	1
McMahon	1
Joe Moffatt	1
James Whittaker	1

==== FA Cup ====
Scorer	Goals
(England) Jimmy Bannister	1

== See also ==
- Manchester City F.C. seasons
