= 1904–05 Manchester City F.C. season =

English football club season

Manchester City F.C.
1904–05 season
- Manager: Tom Maley
- Football League First Division: 3rd
- FA Cup: Second round
- Top goalscorer: League: Turnbull (19 goals); All: Turnbull (20 goals)
- Highest home attendance: 40,000 vs Newcastle United (28 January 1905); 40,000 vs Everton (21 April 1905)
- Lowest home attendance: 8,000 vs Aston Villa (9 November 1904)

The 1904–05 season was Manchester City F.C.'s fourteenth season of league football and second consecutive season in the top flight of English football. The club remained undefeated at home at Hyde Road for the entire season.

In December 1904, George Dorsett joined City from West Bromwich Albion F.C. for a record £450 signing for a winger.

== Football League First Division ==
Pos	Team	Pld	W	D	L	GF	GA	GAv	Pts
1	Newcastle United (C)	34	23	2	9	72	33	2.182	48
2	Everton	34	21	5	8	63	36	1.750	47
3	Manchester City	34	20	6	8	66	37	1.784	46
4	Aston Villa	34	19	4	11	63	43	1.465	42
5	Sunderland	34	16	8	10	60	44	1.364	40

Source: World Football
Rules for classification: 1) Points; 2) Goal average; 3) Goals scored
(C) Champions

=== Results summary ===
Overall								Home						Away					
Pld	W	D	L	GF	GA	GAv	Pts	W	D	L	GF	GA	Pts	W	D	L	GF	GA	Pts
34	20	6	8	66	37	1.784	46	14	3	0	46	17	31	6	3	8	20	20	15

Source: rsssf.com

=== Reports ===
Date	Opponents	H / A	Venue	Result F – A	Scorers	Attendance
3 September 1904	Small Heath	H	Hyde Road	2 – 1	Livingstone, Booth	30,000
10 September 1904	Stoke	A	Victoria Ground	0 – 1		12,000
17 September 1904	Notts County	A	Trent Bridge	1 – 1	Thornley	10,000
24 September 1904	Sheffield United	H	Hyde Road	1 – 1	Thornley	23,000
1 October 1904	Newcastle United	A	St James' Park	0 – 2		22,000
8 October 1904	Preston North End	H	Hyde Road	6 – 1	Turnbull (2), Livingstone (2), Booth, Gillespie	23,000
15 October 1904	Middlesbrough	A	Ayresome Park	1 – 0	Gillespie	12,000
29 October 1904	Bury	A	Gigg Lane	4 – 2	Gillespie, Meredith, Turnbull, Booth	12,000
9 November 1904	Aston Villa	H	Hyde Road	2 – 1	Turnbull, Booth	8,000
12 November 1904	Blackburn Rovers	A	Ewood Park	1 – 3	Turnbull	10,000
14 November 1904	Wolverhampton Wanderers	H	Hyde Road	5 – 1	Meredith, Booth (2), Livingstone, Gillespie	11,000
19 November 1904	Nottingham Forest	H	Hyde Road	1 – 1	Booth	16,000
26 November 1904	The Wednesday	A	Owlerton	1 – 2	Turnbull	15,000
3 December 1904	Sunderland	H	Hyde Road	5 – 2	Turnbull (3), Gillespie, Booth	27,000
10 December 1904	Woolwich Arsenal	A	Manor Ground	0 – 1		16,000
17 December 1904	Derby County	H	Hyde Road	6 – 0	Turnbull (4), Gillespie (2)	22,000
24 December 1904	Everton	A	Goodison Park	0 – 0		16,000
26 December 1904	Preston North End	A	Deepdale	1 – 0	Turnbull	17,000
31 December 1904	Small Heath	A	Muntz Street	1 – 3	Turnbull	11,000
7 January 1905	Stoke	H	Hyde Road	1 – 0	Meredith	12,000
14 January 1905	Notts County	H	Hyde Road	2 – 1	Turnbull, Dorsett	10,000
21 January 1905	Sheffield United	A	Bramall Lane	3 – 0	Dorsett (2), Turnbull	15,000
28 January 1905	Newcastle United	H	Hyde Road	3 – 2	Hynds, Dorsett, Jones	40,000
11 February 1905	Middlesbrough	H	Hyde Road	3 – 2	J. Moffatt, Dorsett, ? (o.g.)	18,000
25 February 1905	Bury	H	Hyde Road	3 – 2	Bannister (2), Meredith	16,000
4 March 1905	Derby County	A	Baseball Ground	1 – 0	Bannister	7,000
11 March 1905	Blackburn Rovers	H	Hyde Road	2 – 1	Meredith, Turnbull	12,000
18 March 1905	Nottingham Forest	A	City Ground	1 – 2	Meredith	10,000
1 April 1905	Sunderland	A	Roker Park	0 – 0		9,000
8 April 1905	Woolwich Arsenal	H	Hyde Road	1 – 0	Meredith	18,000
15 April 1905	The Wednesday	H	Hyde Road	1 – 1	Meredith	20,000
21 April 1905	Everton	H	Hyde Road	2 – 0	Hynds, Livingstone	40,000
24 April 1905	Wolverhampton Wanderers	A	Molineux	3 – 0	Livingstone, Jones, Pearson	15,000
29 April 1905	Aston Villa	A	Villa Park	2 – 3	Turnbull, Livingstone	20,000

== FA Cup ==
Date	Round	Opponents	H / A	Venue	Result F – A	Scorers	Attendance
4 February 1905	First round	Lincoln City	A	Sincil Bank	2 – 1	Meredith, Turnbull	10,000
18 February 1905	Second round	Bolton Wanderers	H	Hyde Road	1 – 2	Gillespie	39,000

== Squad statistics ==
=== Squad ===
Appearances for competitive matches only

Pos.	Name	League		FA Cup		Total	
Pos.	Name	Apps	Goals	Apps	Goals	Apps	Goals
GK	John Edmondson	2	0	0	0	2	0
GK	(England) Jack Hillman	32	0	2	0	34	0
DF	(Scotland) James Buchan	7	0	0	0	7	0
DF	(England) Herbert Burgess	26	0	2	0	28	0
DF	(Scotland) Tommy Hynds	33	2	2	0	35	2
MF	(England) George Dorsett	9	5	2	0	11	5
FW	(England) Jimmy Bannister	6	3	0	0	6	3
FW	(England) Frank Booth	33	8	2	0	35	8
FW	(England) Billie Gillespie	16	7	1	1	17	8
FW	(Wales) Lot Jones	12	2	0	0	12	2
FW	(Wales) Billy Meredith	34	8	2	1	36	9
FW	(England) Irvine Thornley	4	2	0	0	4	2
FW	(Scotland) Sandy Turnbull	30	19	2	1	32	20
--	John Christie	1	0	0	0	1	0
--	R. Dearden	8	0	0	0	8	0
--	Sammy Frost	32	0	1	0	33	0
--	Billy Holmes	4	0	0	0	4	0
--	Geordie Livingstone	26	7	0	0	26	7
--	McMahon	31	0	2	0	33	0
--	(Scotland) Willie McOustra	2	0	0	0	2	0
--	Joe Moffatt	13	1	2	0	15	1
--	Frank Norgrove	10	0	1	0	11	0
--	Frank Pearson	3	1	1	0	4	1
--	Fred Threlfall	1	0	0	0	1	0

=== Scorers ===
==== All ====
Scorer	Goals
(Scotland) Sandy Turnbull	20
(Wales) Billy Meredith	9
(England) Frank Booth	8
(England) Billie Gillespie	8
Geordie Livingstone	7
(England) George Dorsett	5
(England) Jimmy Bannister	3
(Scotland) Tommy Hynds	2
(Wales) Lot Jones	2
(England) Irvine Thornley	2
Joe Moffatt	1
Frank Pearson	1

==== League ====
Scorer	Goals
(Scotland) Sandy Turnbull	19
(England) Frank Booth	8
(Wales) Billy Meredith	8
(England) Billie Gillespie	7
Geordie Livingstone	7
(England) George Dorsett	5
(England) Jimmy Bannister	3
(Scotland) Tommy Hynds	2
(Wales) Lot Jones	2
(England) Irvine Thornley	2
Joe Moffatt	1
Frank Pearson	1

==== FA Cup ====
Scorer	Goals
(England) Billie Gillespie	1
(Wales) Billy Meredith	1
(Scotland) Sandy Turnbull	1

== See also ==
- Manchester City F.C. seasons
