= 1901–02 Manchester City F.C. season =

English football club season

Manchester City F.C.
1901–02 season
- Manager: Sam Ormerod
- Football League: 18th (relegated)
- FA Cup: Second round
- Top goalscorer: League: Gillespie (15 goals); All: Gillespie (15 goals)
- Highest home attendance: 25,000 vs The Wednesday (28 March 1902)
- Lowest home attendance: 7,000 vs Bury (5 April 1902)
Home colours

The 1901–02 season was Manchester City F.C.'s eleventh season of league football and third consecutive season in the First Division of the Football League. It was also the first year in which the club suffered relegation from a division of league football.

== Football League First Division ==
Pos	Team	Pld	W	D	L	GF	GA	GAv	Pts	Relegation
14	Wolverhampton Wanderers	34	13	6	15	46	57	0.807	32	
15	Grimsby Town	34	13	6	15	44	60	0.733	32	
16	Stoke	34	11	9	14	45	55	0.818	31	
17	Small Heath (R)	34	11	8	15	47	45	1.044	30	Relegation to the Second Division
18	Manchester City (R)	34	11	6	17	42	58	0.724	28	Relegation to the Second Division

Source: World Football
Rules for classification: 1) Points; 2) Goal average; 3) Goals scored
(R) Relegated

=== Results summary ===
Overall								Home						Away					
Pld	W	D	L	GF	GA	GAv	Pts	W	D	L	GF	GA	Pts	W	D	L	GF	GA	Pts
34	11	6	17	42	58	0.724	28	10	3	4	28	17	23	1	3	13	14	41	5

Source: rsssf.com

=== Results ===
Date	Opponents	H / A	Venue	Result F – A	Scorers	Attendance
2 September 1901	Everton	A	Goodison Park	1 – 3	Meredith	20,000
7 September 1901	Sunderland	A	Roker Park	0 – 1		14,000
14 September 1901	Small Heath	H	Hyde Road	1 – 4	Scotson	18,000
21 September 1901	Derby County	A	Baseball Ground	0 – 2		10,000
5 October 1901	Notts County	A	Trent Bridge	0 – 2		12,000
12 October 1901	Bolton Wanderers	H	Hyde Road	1 – 0	F. Williams	20,000
19 October 1901	Grimsby Town	H	Hyde Road	3 – 0	Meredith, Gillespie, F. Williams	18,000
26 October 1901	Wolverhampton Wanderers	A	Molineux	0 – 0		8,000
2 November 1901	Liverpool	H	Hyde Road	2 – 3	Gillespie, F. Williams	22,000
9 November 1901	Newcastle United	A	St James' Park	0 – 3		8,000
23 November 1901	Sheffield United	A	Bramall Lane	0 – 5		10,000
30 November 1901	Nottingham Forest	H	Hyde Road	3 – 1	Meredith, Morgan, R. Jones	15,000
7 December 1901	Bury	A	Gigg Lane	0 – 3		9,000
14 December 1901	Blackburn Rovers	H	Hyde Road	1 – 1	Meredith	10,000
21 December 1901	Stoke	A	Victoria Ground	Abandoned after 75 minutes 0 – 2		6,000
26 December 1901	The Wednesday	A	Owlerton	1 – 2	R. Jones	10,000
1 January 1902	Bolton Wanderers	A	Burnden Park	3 – 3	Meredith, Ross, Henderson	19,853
4 January 1902	Sunderland	H	Hyde Road	0 – 3		15,000
11 January 1902	Small Heath	A	Muntz Street	0 – 1		12,000
13 January 1902	Stoke	A	Victoria Ground	0 – 3		5,000
18 January 1902	Derby County	H	Hyde Road	0 – 0		18,000
1 February 1902	Notts County	H	Hyde Road	1 – 0	Threlfall	20,000
15 February 1902	Grimsby Town	A	Blundell Park	2 – 3	Gillespie (2)	4,000
17 February 1902	Aston Villa	H	Hyde Road	1 – 0	Hosie	17,000
22 February 1902	Wolverhampton Wanderers	H	Hyde Road	3 – 0	Gillespie (2), McOustra	16,269
1 March 1902	Liverpool	A	Anfield	0 – 4		20,000
8 March 1902	Newcastle United	H	Hyde Road	2 – 0	Hynds (2)	20,000
17 March 1902	Everton	H	Hyde Road	2 – 0	Meredith, McOustra	22,000
22 March 1902	Sheffield United	H	Hyde Road	4 – 0	Gillespie (2), Meredith, Hosie	20,000
28 March 1902	The Wednesday	H	Hyde Road	0 – 3		25,000
29 March 1902	Nottingham Forest	A	City Ground	1 – 3	Hosie	10,000
31 March 1902	Aston Villa	A	Villa Park	2 – 2	Gillespie, Drummond	18,000
5 April 1902	Bury	H	Hyde Road	2 – 0	Gillespie, Meredith	7,000
12 April 1902	Blackburn Rovers	A	Ewood Park	4 – 1	Gillespie (4)	3,000
19 April 1902	Stoke	H	Hyde Road	2 – 2	Gillespie, Drummond	12,000

== FA Cup ==
Date	Round	Opponents	H / A	Venue	Result F – A	Scorers	Attendance
25 January 1902	First round	Preston North End	H	Hyde Road	1 – 1	Henderson	10,000
29 January 1902	First round replay	Preston North End	A	The Hawthorns	0 – 0 (aet)		7,000
3 February 1902	First round second replay	Preston North End	A	The Hawthorns	4 – 2 (aet)	B. Smith (3), Morgan	5,000
7 February 1902	Second round	Nottingham Forest	H	Hyde Road	0 – 2		16,000

== Squad statistics ==
=== Squad ===
Appearances for competitive matches only

Pos.	Name	League		FA Cup		Abandoned		Total	
Pos.	Name	Apps	Goals	Apps	Goals	Apps	Goals	Apps	Goals
GK	(Scotland) Frank Barrett	5	0	4	0	1	0	10	0
GK	(England) Jack Hillman	14	0	0	0	0	0	14	0
GK	(England) Charlie Williams	15	0	0	0	0	0	15	0
DF	(Scotland) Tommy Hynds	29	2	4	0	1	0	34	2
DF	(Wales) Di Jones	20	0	0	0	1	0	21	0
FW	(England) Billie Gillespie	30	15	0	0	0	0	30	15
FW	(England) Daniel Hurst	15	0	0	0	1	0	16	0
FW	(Wales) Billy Meredith	33	8	4	0	1	0	38	8
FW	(Scotland) Jimmy Ross	7	1	1	0	1	0	9	1
FW	(England) Fred Williams	13	3	0	0	0	0	13	3
--	Fred Bevan	2	0	0	0	1	0	3	0
--	Jimmy Drummond	13	2	0	0	0	0	13	2
--	Sammy Frost	2	0	0	0	0	0	2	0
--	John Henderson	4	1	2	1	0	0	6	2
--	Billy Holmes	6	0	0	0	0	0	6	0
--	Jamie Hosie	33	3	4	0	1	0	38	3
--	Robert Hunter	5	0	0	0	0	0	5	0
--	Dick Jones	11	2	2	0	1	0	14	2
HB	(Scotland) Willie McOustra	13	2	0	0	0	0	13	2
--	Bobby Moffatt	21	0	2	0	0	0	23	0
--	Hugh Morgan	12	1	3	1	0	0	15	2
--	Willie Orr	23	0	4	0	1	0	28	0
--	Thomas Read	4	0	0	0	0	0	4	0
--	Jimmy Scotson	3	1	1	0	0	0	4	1
--	Percy Slater	13	0	4	0	0	0	17	0
DF	(England) William "Buxton" Smith	16	0	4	3	1	0	21	3
--	Fred Threlfall	18	1	4	0	0	0	22	1
--	Lionel Watson	1	0	0	0	0	0	1	0

=== Scorers ===
==== All ====
Scorer	Goals
(England) Billie Gillespie	15
(Wales) Billy Meredith	8
James Hosie	3
(England) William "Buxton" Smith	3
(England) Fred Williams	3
Jimmy Drummond	2
John Henderson	2
(Scotland) Tommy Hynds	2
Dick Jones	2
(Scotland) Willie McOustra	2
Hugh Morgan	2
(Scotland) Jimmy Ross	1
Jimmy Scotson	1
Fred Threlfall	1

==== League ====
Scorer	Goals
(England) Billie Gillespie	15
(Wales) Billy Meredith	8
James Hosie	3
(England) Fred Williams	3
Jimmy Drummond	2
(Scotland) Tommy Hynds	2
Dick Jones	2
(Scotland) Willie McOustra	2
John Henderson	1
Hugh Morgan	1
(Scotland) Jimmy Ross	1
Jimmy Scotson	1
Fred Threlfall	1

==== FA Cup ====
Scorer	Goals
(England) William "Buxton" Smith	3
John Henderson	1
Hugh Morgan	1

== See also ==
- Manchester City F.C. seasons
