= 1907–08 Manchester United F.C. season =

English football club season

Manchester United
1907–08 season
- Chairman: John Henry Davies
- Manager: Ernest Mangnall
- Stadium: Bank Street Ground
- First Division: 1st
- FA Cup: Fourth Round
- Charity Shield: Winners
- Top goalscorer: League: Sandy Turnbull (25); All: Sandy Turnbull (27)
- Highest home attendance: 50,000 vs Newcastle United (8 February 1908)
- Lowest home attendance: 6,000 vs Everton (9 November 1904)
- Average home league attendance: 22,105
Home colours	Away colours

The 1907–08 season was Manchester United's 16th season in the Football League. They won the Football League First Division, marking their first league title.

== First Division ==
Date	Opponents	H / A	Result F–A	Scorers	Attendance
2 September 1907	Aston Villa	A	4–1	Wall 4', Meredith 42', 85', Bannister 90'	20,000
7 September 1907	Liverpool	H	4–0	Wall 44', S. Turnbull 35', 48', 50'	24,000
9 September 1907	Middlesbrough	H	2–1	S. Turnbull 65', 75'	20,000
14 September 1907	Middlesbrough	A	1–2	Bannister 75'	18,000
21 September 1907	Sheffield United	H	2–1	S. Turnbull 8', 35'	25,000
28 September 1907	Chelsea	A	4–1	Meredith 7', 89', S. Turnbull 28', Bannister 48'	40,000
5 October 1907	Nottingham Forest	H	4–0	Bannister 10', Maltby 46' (o.g.), Wall 75', J. Turnbull 88'	20,000
12 October 1907	Newcastle United	A	6–1	Meredith 4', J. Turnbull 21', S. Turnbull 23' (pen.), Wall 50', 62', Roberts 60'	25,000
19 October 1907	Blackburn Rovers	A	5–1	S. Turnbull 10', 40' (??), J. Turnbull (??)	30,000
26 October 1907	Bolton Wanderers	H	2–1	J. Turnbull 18', S. Turnbull 46'	35,000
2 November 1907	Birmingham City	A	4–3	J. Turnbull 15', Meredith 21', 55', Wall 57'	20,000
9 November 1907	Everton	H	4–3	Meredith 29', Roberts 65', Wall 67', 69'	6,000
16 November 1907	Sunderland	A	2–1	S. Turnbull 53', 59'	30,000
23 November 1907	Woolwich Arsenal	H	4–2	S. Turnbull 2', 32', 67', 75'	10,000
30 November 1907	Sheffield Wednesday	A	0–2		40,000
7 December 1907	Bristol City	H	2–1	Wall 20', 80'	20,000
14 December 1907	Notts County	A	1–1	Meredith 40'	11,000
21 December 1907	Manchester City	H	3–1	Wall 10', S. Turnbull 30', 46'	35,000
25 December 1907	Bury	H	2–1	J. Turnbull 12', Meredith 43'	45,000
28 December 1907	Preston North End	A	0–0		12,000
1 January 1908	Bury	A	1–0	Wall 60'	29,500
18 January 1908	Sheffield United	A	0–2		17,000
25 January 1908	Chelsea	H	1–0	J. Turnbull 80'	20,000
8 February 1908	Newcastle United	H	1–1	J. Turnbull 20'	50,000
15 February 1908	Blackburn Rovers	H	1–2	S. Turnbull 75' (pen.)	15,000
29 February 1908	Birmingham City	H	1–0	S. Turnbull 9'	12,000
14 March 1908	Sunderland	H	3–0	Bell 30', Berry 38', Wall 55'	15,000
21 March 1908	Woolwich Arsenal	A	0–1		20,000
25 March 1908	Liverpool	A	4–7	Wall (??), 68', S. Turnbull 79', Bannister 84'	10,000
28 March 1908	Sheffield Wednesday	H	4–1	Halse 1', Wall 55', 65', S. Turnbull 63'	30,000
4 April 1908	Bristol City	A	1–1	Wall 30'	12,000
8 April 1908	Everton	A	3–1	Halse 45', S. Turnbull 70' (pen.), Wall 90'	17,000
11 April 1908	Notts County	H	0–1		20,000
17 April 1908	Nottingham Forest	A	0–2		22,000
18 April 1908	Manchester City	A	0–0		40,000
20 April 1908	Aston Villa	H	1–2	Picken 15'	10,000
22 April 1908	Bolton Wanderers	A	2–2	Halse 40', Stacey 80' (pen.)	18,000
25 April 1908	Preston North End	H	2–1	Halse (??), Rodway (??)	8,000

Pos	Team	Pld	W	D	L	GF	GA	GAv	Pts
1	Manchester United (C)	38	23	6	9	81	48	1.688	52
2	Aston Villa	38	17	9	12	77	59	1.305	43
3	Manchester City	38	16	11	11	62	54	1.148	43
4	Newcastle United	38	15	12	11	65	54	1.204	42
5	The Wednesday	38	19	4	15	73	64	1.141	42

Source: World Football
Rules for classification: 1) Points; 2) Goal average; 3) Goals scored
(C) Champions

== FA Cup ==
Date	Round	Opponents	H / A	Result F–A	Scorers	Attendance
11 January 1908	First Round	Blackpool	H	3–1	Wall (??), Bannister (??)	11,747
1 February 1908	Second Round	Chelsea	H	1–0	S. Turnbull 2'	25,184
22 February 1908	Third Round	Aston Villa	A	2–0	Wall 27', S. Turnbull 33'	12,777
7 March 1908	Fourth Round	Fulham	A	1–2	J. Turnbull 56'	41,000

== FA Charity Shield ==
Date	Opponents	H / A	Result F–A	Scorers	Attendance
27 April 1908	Queens Park Rangers	N	1–1	Meredith 60'	6,000
Replay
29 August 1908	Queens Park Rangers	N	4–0	J. Turnbull 25', 30', 75', Wall 56'	6,000
