= 1900–01 Manchester City F.C. season =

English football club season

Manchester City F.C.
1900–01 season
- Manager: Sam Ormerod
- Football League: 11th
- FA Cup: First round
- Top goalscorer: League: Cassidy (14 goals); All: Cassidy (14 goals)
- Highest home attendance: 23,000 vs Bury (5 January 1901); 23,000 vs West Brom (5 April 1901)
- Lowest home attendance: 8,000 vs Blackburn (19 January 1901)
Home colours

The 1900–01 season was Manchester City F.C.'s tenth season of league football and second season in the First Division of the Football League.

== Football League First Division ==
Pos	Team	Pld	W	D	L	GF	GA	GAv	Pts
9	Blackburn Rovers	34	12	9	13	39	47	0.830	33
10	Bolton Wanderers	34	13	7	14	39	55	0.709	33
11	Manchester City	34	13	6	15	48	58	0.828	32
12	Derby County	34	12	7	15	55	42	1.310	31
13	Wolverhampton Wanderers	34	9	13	12	39	55	0.709	31

Source: World Football
Rules for classification: 1) Points; 2) Goal average; 3) Goals scored

=== Results summary ===
Overall								Home						Away					
Pld	W	D	L	GF	GA	GAv	Pts	W	D	L	GF	GA	Pts	W	D	L	GF	GA	Pts
34	13	6	15	48	58	0.828	32	12	3	2	32	16	27	1	3	13	16	42	5

Source: rsssf.com

=== Reports ===
Date	Opponents	H / A	Venue	Result F – A	Scorers	Attendance
1 September 1900	The Wednesday	H	Hyde Road	2 – 2	Ross, Dougal	18,000
8 September 1900	Bury	A	Gigg Lane	0 – 4		17,000
15 September 1900	Nottingham Forest	H	Hyde Road	1 – 0	Cassidy	20,000
22 September 1900	Blackburn Rovers	A	Ewood Park	0 – 1		10,000
29 September 1900	Stoke	H	Hyde Road	2 – 0	Meredith, Davies	20,000
6 October 1900	West Bromwich Albion	A	The Hawthorns	2 – 3	Holmes, Moffatt	5,000
13 October 1900	Everton	H	Hyde Road	1 – 0	Cassidy	15,000
20 October 1900	Sunderland	A	Roker Park	0 – 3		10,000
27 October 1900	Derby County	H	Hyde Road	2 – 0	F. Williams (2)	15,000
3 November 1900	Bolton Wanderers	A	Burnden Park	0 – 0		20,000
10 November 1900	Notts County	H	Hyde Road	2 – 0	Gillespie, Cassidy	16,000
17 November 1900	Preston North End	A	Deepdale	4 – 0	Cassidy (2), Gillespie, F. Williams	5,000
24 November 1900	Wolverhampton Wanderers	H	Hyde Road	3 – 2	Meredith, Ross, Cassidy	16,000
1 December 1900	Aston Villa	A	Villa Park	1 – 7	Cassidy	12,000
8 December 1900	Liverpool	H	Hyde Road	3 – 4	Cassidy (2), B. Smith	18,000
15 December 1900	Newcastle United	A	St James' Park	1 – 2	F. Williams	16,000
22 December 1900	Sheffield United	H	Hyde Road	2 – 1	Meredith, Gillespie	15,000
25 December 1900	Sunderland	H	Hyde Road	1 – 1	Gillespie	20,000
26 December 1900	Sheffield United	A	Bramall Lane	1 – 1	Gillespie	20,000
29 December 1900	The Wednesday	A	Owlerton	1 – 4	Cassidy	15,000
5 January 1901	Bury	H	Hyde Road	1 – 0	Cassidy	23,000
12 January 1901	Nottingham Forest	A	City Ground	2 – 4	Gillespie, Cassidy	8,000
19 January 1901	Blackburn Rovers	H	Hyde Road	1 – 3	Meredith	8,000
26 January 1901	Stoke	A	Victoria Ground	1 – 2	Cassidy	3,000
16 February 1901	Everton	A	Goodison Park	2 – 5	Meredith, Cassidy	20,000
23 February 1901	Preston North End	H	Hyde Road	3 – 1	Meredith, F. Williams, Dougal	10,000
2 March 1901	Derby County	A	Baseball Ground	0 – 2		5,000
9 March 1901	Bolton Wanderers	H	Hyde Road	1 – 1	Holmes	15,000
16 March 1901	Notts County	A	Trent Bridge	0 – 0		6,000
30 March 1901	Wolverhampton Wanderers	A	Molineux	0 – 1		3,000
5 April 1901	West Bromwich Albion	H	Hyde Road	1 – 0	Gillespie	23,000
13 April 1901	Liverpool	A	Anfield	1 – 3	Meredith	15,000
20 April 1901	Newcastle United	H	Hyde Road	2 – 1	Gillespie (2)	20,000
27 April 1901	Aston Villa	H	Hyde Road	4 – 0	Scotson (2), Threlfall, Ross	15,000

== FA Cup ==
Date	Round	Opponents	H / A	Venue	Result F – A	Scorers	Attendance
9 February 1901	First round	West Bromwich Albion	A	The Hawthorns	0 – 1		16,000

== Squad statistics ==
=== Squad ===
Appearances for competitive matches only

Pos.	Name	League		FA Cup		Total	
Pos.	Name	Apps	Goals	Apps	Goals	Apps	Goals
GK	(England) Walter Cox	1	0	0	0	1	0
GK	(England) Charlie Williams	33	0	1	0	34	0
DF	(Wales) Di Jones	33	0	1	0	34	0
FW	(Scotland) Joe Cassidy	30	14	1	0	31	14
FW	(England) Billie Gillespie	23	9	0	0	23	9
FW	(England) Howard Harvey	2	0	0	0	2	0
FW	(England) Frank Hesham	1	0	0	0	1	0
FW	(Wales) Billy Meredith	34	7	1	0	35	7
FW	(England) Fred Williams	23	5	1	0	24	5
--	Herbert Dartnell	3	0	0	0	3	0
--	Alex Davidson	2	0	0	0	2	0
--	Davies	3	1	0	0	3	1
--	George Dougal	8	2	0	0	8	2
--	Herbert Hallows	1	0	0	0	1	0
--	Billy Holmes	28	2	1	0	29	2
--	James Hosie	3	0	0	0	3	0
--	Robert Hunter	2	0	0	0	2	0
FB	(Scotland) Peter Meechan	6	0	0	0	6	0
--	Bobby Moffatt	32	1	1	0	33	1
--	Thomas Read	27	0	1	0	28	0
--	(Scotland) Jimmy Ross	13	3	1	0	14	3
--	Jimmy Scotson	5	2	0	0	5	2
--	Percy Slater	3	0	0	0	3	0
--	(England) William "Buxton" Smith	32	1	1	0	33	1
--	Fred Threlfall	4	1	0	0	4	1

=== Scorers ===
==== All ====
Scorer	Goals
(Scotland) Joe Cassidy	14
(England) Billie Gillespie	9
(Wales) Billy Meredith	7
(England) Fred Williams	5
(Scotland) Jimmy Ross	3
George Dougal	2
Billy Holmes	2
Jimmy Scotson	2
Davies	1
Bobby Moffatt	1
(England) William "Buxton" Smith	1
Fred Threlfall	1

==== League ====
Scorer	Goals
(Scotland) Joe Cassidy	14
(England) Billie Gillespie	9
(Wales) Billy Meredith	7
(England) Fred Williams	5
(Scotland) Jimmy Ross	3
George Dougal	2
Billy Holmes	2
Jimmy Scotson	2
Davies	1
Bobby Moffatt	1
(England) William "Buxton" Smith	1
Fred Threlfall	1

== See also ==
- Manchester City F.C. seasons
