= 1898–99 Manchester City F.C. season =

English football club season

Manchester City F.C.
1898–99 season
- Manager: Sam Ormerod
- Football League: 1st
- FA Cup: First round
- Top goalscorer: League: Meredith (29 goals); All: Meredith (30 goals)
- Highest home attendance: 20,000 vs Newton Heath (26 December 1898); 20,000 vs Small Heath (8 April 1899)
- Lowest home attendance: 4,000 vs Loughborough (17 December 1898)

The 1898–99 season was Manchester City F.C.'s eighth season of league football and seventh season in the Football League. The season saw their first title as they won the Football League Second Division, earning promotion to the First Division.

== Football League Second Division ==
Pos	Team	Pld	W	D	L	GF	GA	GAv	Pts	Promotion or relegation
1	Manchester City (C, P)	34	23	6	5	92	35	2.629	52	Promotion to the First Division
2	Glossop North End (P)	34	20	6	8	76	38	2.000	46	Promotion to the First Division
3	Leicester Fosse	34	18	9	7	64	42	1.524	45	
4	Newton Heath	34	19	5	10	67	43	1.558	43	
5	New Brighton Tower	34	18	7	9	71	52	1.365	43	

Rules for classification: 1) Points; 2) Goal average; 3) Goals scored
(C) Champions; (P) Promoted

=== Results summary ===
Overall								Home						Away					
Pld	W	D	L	GF	GA	GAv	Pts	W	D	L	GF	GA	Pts	W	D	L	GF	GA	Pts
34	23	6	5	92	35	2.629	52	15	1	1	64	10	31	8	5	4	28	25	21

Source: rsssf.com

=== Reports ===
Date	Opponents	H / A	Venue	Result F – A	Scorers	Attendance
3 September 1898	Grimsby Town	H	Hyde Road	7 – 2	Meredith (3), Gillespie (3), Whitehead	10,000
10 September 1898	Newton Heath	A	Bank Street	0 – 3		15,000
17 September 1898	New Brighton Tower	H	Hyde Road	1 – 1	Cowie	6,000
24 September 1898	Lincoln City	A	Sincil Bank	1 – 3	Whitehead	3,000
1 October 1898	Woolwich Arsenal	H	Hyde Road	3 – 1	Read, S. Smith, Dougal	6,000
8 October 1898	Luton Town	A	Dunstable Road	3 – 0	Meredith, S. Smith, Cowie	10,000
15 October 1898	Leicester Fosse	H	Hyde Road	3 – 1	Meredith, S. Smith, Gillespie	8,000
22 October 1898	Darwen	A	Barley Bank	2 – 0	Meredith, S. Smith	7,000
5 November 1898	Barnsley	A	Oakwell	1 – 1	Cowie	4,000
12 November 1898	Glossop North End	A	North Road	2 – 1	Meredith, Gillespie	6,000
19 November 1898	Walsall	H	Hyde Road	2 – 0	Jones, Gillespie	10,000
26 November 1898	Burton Swifts	A	Peel Croft	3 – 3	Meredith, Moffatt, Gillespie	5,000
3 December 1898	Burslem Port Vale	H	Hyde Road	3 – 1	Meredith (2), Dougal	10,000
10 December 1898	Loughborough	A	Athletic Ground	3 – 1	Bill Smith, Meredith, F. Williams	10,000
17 December 1898	Loughborough	H	Hyde Road	5 – 0	Meredith (3), Ray, S. Smith	4,000
24 December 1898	Blackpool	A	Athletic Grounds	4 – 2	Moffatt (2), Meredith, Gillespie	8,000
26 December 1898	Newton Heath	H	Hyde Road	4 – 0	Meredith, Gillespie, Dougal, F. Williams	20,000
27 December 1898	Small Heath	A	Muntz Street	1 – 4	Dougal	10,000
31 December 1898	Grimsby Town	A	Abbey Park	Abandoned; 0 – 0		300
2 January 1899	Glossop North End	H	Tower Athletic Grounds	0 – 2		7,000
14 January 1899	New Brighton Tower	A	Hyde Road	1 – 0	Gillespie	10,000
4 February 1899	Luton Town	H	Hyde Road	2 – 0	S. Smith, Gillespie	8,000
11 February 1899	Leicester Fosse	A	Filbert Street	1 – 1	F. Williams	10,000
18 February 1899	Darwen	H	Hyde Road	10 – 0	F. Williams (5), Meredith (3), Dougal, S. Smith	8,000
22 February 1899	Lincoln City	H	Hyde Road	3 – 1	S. Smith, Gillespie, F. Williams	5,000
25 February 1899	Gainsborough Trinity	A	The Northolme	1 – 3	Meredith	5,000
4 March 1899	Barnsley	H	Hyde Road	5 – 0	Meredith (3), Ross (2)	12,000
18 March 1899	Walsall	A	Hillary Street	1 – 1	Ross	6,000
25 March 1899	Burton Swifts	H	Hyde Road	6 – 0	Meredith (2), Ross (2), Moffatt, Dougal	6,000
31 March 1899	Gainsborough Trinity	H	Hyde Road	4 – 0	Gillespie (2), Dougal, Ross	15,000
1 April 1899	Burslem Port Vale	A	Athletic Ground	1 – 1	Meredith	12,000
3 April 1899	Woolwich Arsenal	A	Manor Ground	1 – 0	Gillespie	5,000
8 April 1899	Small Heath	H	Hyde Road	2 – 0	F. Williams (2)	20,000
11 April 1899	Grimsby Town	A	Abbey Park	2 – 1	Meredith, Gillespie	5,000
22 April 1899	Blackpool	H	Hyde Road	4 – 1	Meredith (2), Gillespie, Ross	10,000

== FA Cup ==
Date	Round	Opponents	H / A	Venue	Result F – A	Scorers	Attendance
28 January 1899	First round	Small Heath	A	Muntz Street	2 – 3	Meredith, Gillespie	15,399

== Squad statistics ==
=== Squad ===
Appearances for competitive matches only

Pos.	Name	League		FA Cup		Abandoned		Total	
Pos.	Name	Apps	Goals	Apps	Goals	Apps	Goals	Apps	Goals
GK	Tommy Chappell	1	0	0	0	0	0	1	0
GK	(England) Charlie Williams	33	0	1	0	1	0	35	0
DF	(Wales) Di Jones	27	1	1	0	1	0	29	1
DF	(England) Dick Ray	24	1	1	0	1	0	26	1
MF	(Scotland) Stuart Munn	6	0	0	0	0	0	6	0
FW	(Canada) Walter Bowman	3	0	0	0	0	0	3	0
FW	(England) Billie Gillespie	30	17	1	1	1	0	32	18
FW	(Wales) Billy Meredith	33	29	1	1	1	0	35	30
FW	(England) Bill Smith	34	1	1	0	1	0	36	1
FW	(England) Jimmy Whitehead	4	2	0	0	0	0	4	2
FW	(England) Fred Williams	25	11	1	0	1	0	27	11
--	Andrew Cowie	11	3	0	0	0	0	11	3
--	George Dougal	31	7	1	0	1	0	33	7
--	Billy Holmes	25	0	0	0	1	0	26	0
--	Bobby Moffatt	34	4	1	0	1	0	36	4
--	Thomas Read	20	1	0	0	0	0	20	1
--	(Scotland) Jimmy Ross	9	7	0	0	0	0	9	7
--	S. Smith	25	8	1	0	1	0	27	8

=== Scorers ===
==== All ====
Scorer	Goals
(Wales) Billy Meredith	30
(England) Billie Gillespie	18
(England) Fred Williams	11
S. Smith	8
George Dougal	7
(Scotland) Jimmy Ross	7
Bobby Moffatt	4
Andrew Cowie	3
(England) Jimmy Whitehead	2
(Wales) Di Jones	1
(England) Dick Ray	1
Thomas Read	1
(England) Bill Smith	1

==== League ====
Scorer	Goals
(Wales) Billy Meredith	29
(England) Billie Gillespie	17
(England) Fred Williams	11
S. Smith	8
George Dougal	7
(Scotland) Jimmy Ross	7
Bobby Moffatt	4
Andrew Cowie	3
(England) Jimmy Whitehead	2
(Wales) Di Jones	1
(England) Dick Ray	1
Thomas Read	1
(England) Bill Smith	1

==== FA Cup ====
Scorer	Goals
(England) Billie Gillespie	1
(Wales) Billy Meredith	1

== See also ==
- Manchester City F.C. seasons
