= Willie McOustra =

Scottish footballer

Personal information
- Full name: William McOustra
- Date of birth: 1881
- Place of birth: Larbert, Scotland
- Date of death: 1953 (aged 71–72)
- Place of death: Glasgow, Scotland
- Positions: Left half; inside right

Senior career*
Years	Team	Apps	(Gls)
- Heather Rangers
–1899	Ashfield		
1899–1902	Celtic	22	(8)
1900	→ Stenhousemuir (loan)		
1902–1907	Manchester City	65	(6)
1907–1909	Blackpool	0	(0)
1909	Stenhousemuir		
1909–1910	Abercorn		
1910–1914	Alloa Athletic		
- * Club domestic league appearances and goals

William McOustra (1881–1953) was a Scottish professional footballer who played as a left half and inside right in the Football League for Manchester City. He also played in the Scottish League for Celtic and later served on the groundstaff at Celtic Park.

== Personal life ==
In September 1914, one month after the outbreak of the First World War, McOustra enlisted as a private in the Scots Guards. He arrived on the Western Front in March 1915 and was medically discharged from the army in September 1917, due to a gunshot wound to the right knee.

== Career statistics ==
Appearances and goals by club, season and competition
Club	Season	League			National Cup		Other		Total	
Club	Season	Division	Apps	Goals	Apps	Goals	Apps	Goals	Apps	Goals
Celtic	1899–1900	Scottish First Division	0	0	0	0	1 (Note: Appearances in Glasgow Cup)	0	1	0
Celtic	1900–01	Scottish First Division	13	4	5	3	2	0	20	7
Celtic	1901–02	Scottish First Division	9	4	2	0	1	1	12	5
Celtic	Total		22	8	7	3	4	1	33	12
Manchester City	1901–02	First Division	13	2	—		—		13	2
Manchester City	1902–03	Second Division	32	4	0	0	—		32	4
Manchester City	1903–04	First Division	2	0	0	0	—		2	0
Manchester City	1904–05	First Division	2	0	0	0	—		2	0
Manchester City	1905–06	First Division	7	0	0	0	—		7	0
Manchester City	1906–07	First Division	9	0	0	0	—		9	0
Manchester City	Total		65	6	0	0	—		65	6
Career total			87	14	7	3	4	1	98	18
