= Billy Meredith =

Welsh footballer (1874–1958)

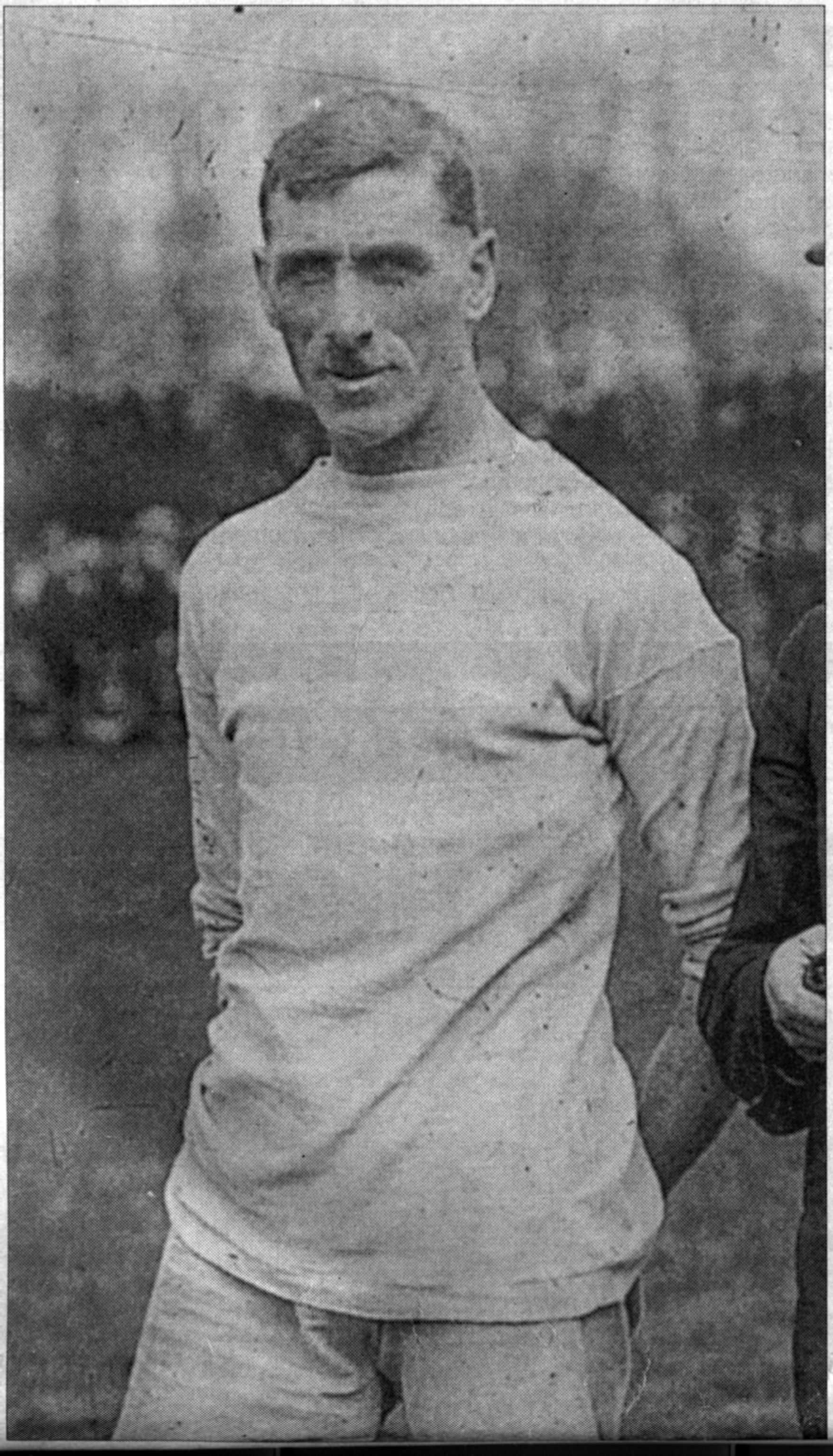
- Meredith as a Manchester City player in 1903

Personal information
- Full name: William Henry Meredith
- Date of birth: 30 July 1874
- Place of birth: Chirk, Wales
- Date of death: 19 April 1958 (aged 83)
- Place of death: Withington, England
- Height: 5 ft 9 in (1.75 m)
- Position: Outside forward

Youth career
- Black Park

Senior career*
Years	Team	Apps	(Gls)
1890–1892	Chirk		
1892–1894	Northwich Victoria	11	(5)
1894	Wrexham		
1894	Chirk		
1894–1906	Manchester City	338	(147)
1906–1921	Manchester United	303	(35)
1921–1924	Manchester City	28	(1)
Total		680	(188)

International career
1895–1920	Wales	48	(11)
- * Club domestic league appearances and goals

William Henry Meredith (30 July 1874 – 19 April 1958) was a Welsh professional footballer. He was considered one of the early superstars of football due to his performances, notably for Manchester City and Manchester United. He won each domestic trophy in the English football league and gained 48 caps for Wales, for whom he scored eleven goals and won two British Home Championship titles. His favoured position was outside right, and his key skills were dribbling, passing, crossing and shooting. A dedicated and extremely fit professional, his habit of chewing on a toothpick during games made him instantly recognisable.

In 27 seasons in the Football League from 1892 to 1924 (not including the four seasons lost to the First World War and the 1905–06 season in which he was banned for bribing an opposition player), he scored 194 goals in 740 league and cup appearances. He played for Chirk before joining Northwich Victoria in 1892. His career took off when he signed with Manchester City in 1894 and turned professional in January 1895. He captained the team to the club's first major honour, a 1–0 victory over Bolton Wanderers in the 1904 FA Cup final. He moved to Manchester United in May 1906 after being banned for bribing Aston Villa half-back Alex Leake £10 to lose a match. There, he won the league title in 1907–08 and 1910–11, the FA Cup in 1909, and two FA Charity Shields. He also helped to set up the Players' Union, which was a forerunner of the Professional Footballers' Association. He returned to Manchester City in 1921 at age 47 and played 32 games before retiring in 1924, making him the oldest-ever player for City, United and Wales. He later ran the Stretford Road Hotel and helped to coach the short-lived Manchester Central.

Including wartime results and appearances in reserve teams, he has made over 1,050 appearances in his career.

== Early life ==
Meredith was born in 1874 in Chirk, a small mining town in Denbighshire, Wales, just south of Wrexham. He started work at Black Park Colliery as a pit pony driver at the age of 12. His family were Primitive Methodists, and Meredith himself remained a lifelong teetotaller. He spent eight years working in the mines and worked during a tough time for the industry, enduring a 25% pay cut which led to strike action in 1893; this experience helped to shape his political views, which would become significant later in his life. An interest in football was kindled by his elder brothers. Elias, the eldest, was a train driver for the Lancashire and Yorkshire Railway. His work allowed him to take Meredith to watch professional teams such as Everton. Football was a keen pastime for the miners, and the standard of amateur teams from towns and villages in north east Wales was high as a result; Chirk won the Welsh Cup five times between 1887 and 1894, with miners making up a large proportion of the team. All the Meredith brothers played football, but Sam, two years older than Billy, was the first to make an impression. He left Chirk to attempt a professional career and went on to play for Stoke City as a full-back.

Meredith made his debut for the Chirk first team in September 1892. The club played in The Combination, a league which contained a mixture of town clubs and reserve teams of clubs from big cities. At the end of his first season, Meredith played in the 1893 Welsh Cup final, which Chirk lost 2–1 to Wrexham. Meredith formed a solid understanding with inside-right William Owen, a former Wales international. Chirk withdrew from The Combination and entered only the Welsh league in 1893 due to low attendances caused by the coal miners' strike. In an attempt to make ends meet, Meredith not only played for Chirk but accepted an offer to play for Football League club Northwich Victoria as well, who gave him a small fee on top of his expenses. Northwich were a struggling side who withdrew from the Football League at the end of the 1893–94 season after finishing bottom of the Second Division. The club won just three league matches; Meredith featured in each win. Back at Chirk, Meredith gained his first honour as part of the team that beat Westminster Rovers to win the 1894 Welsh Cup. Meredith also played for Wrexham in 1894, sharing his talents between them, Chirk and Northwich Victoria that year.

== Club career ==
=== First spell at Manchester City ===
Meredith's performances for Northwich gained the attention of several other clubs in the Football League. Bolton Wanderers full-back Di Jones, a former Chirk player, spoke with him about a possible move. Still, Bolton secretary J.J. Bentley felt Meredith was too inexperienced and his frame too slight. Lawrence Furniss, an official at Ardwick, had first noticed him while refereeing a Northwich match. Meredith also played in both meetings between the clubs that season. Later, in 1894, Ardwick, known as Manchester City, vigorously pursued Meredith's signature. Two club officials travelled to Wales to meet the player. One was secretary-manager Joshua Parlby, the other either Furniss or chairman John Chapman. The pair were met with suspicion. Anecdotes by contemporary figures suggest locals initially chased them away and were only allowed to speak to Meredith after they bought drinks for his mining colleagues. Meredith did not wish to abandon life in Chirk. His mother was particularly against the idea: "It is all very well for you gentlemen to leave your big cities and come to our villages to steal our boys away ... Our boys are happy and healthy, satisfied with their work and innocent amusements ... if Billy takes my advice he will stick to his work and play football for his own amusement when work is finished." Meredith eventually signed for Manchester City as an amateur. He continued to work at the pit for at least a year, commuting for matches.

Meredith made his Manchester City debut in November 1894 in a 5–4 loss to Newcastle United. The following week he played his first home match for the club at Hyde Road, and scored two goals against Newton Heath – who later became Manchester United – in the first Manchester derby to take place in the league. Newton Heath won the match 5–2. He turned professional in January 1895. He ended the 1894–95 season with 12 goals in 18 appearances, just three strikes behind top-scorer Pat Finnerhan, who had played an extra 12 games.

Meredith finished as top scorer in his first full season at Manchester City. He was appointed club captain in his second season at the club, aged just 21. The club finished as Second Division runners-up in 1895–96, but were denied promotion after heavy defeats to West Bromwich Albion and Small Heath in the test matches. After the departure of strike partner Pat Finnerhan to Liverpool in March 1897, Meredith remained as City's star player.

His new partner for the 1897–98 season was William Smith (known as "Stockport Smith" to differentiate him from another William Smith in the team), whilst Billie Gillespie was placed at centre-forward. Meredith provided Gillespie with many crosses into the box, picking up numerous assists as Gillespie outscored Meredith by 19 goals to 12. Meredith also mentored the slightly younger Gillespie, steering him away from drinking sessions by taking him along on fishing trips. The final match of the season saw Meredith score his first hat-trick for the club in an emphatic 9–0 win against Burton Swifts.

"Oh I wish I was you Billy Meredith
I wish I was you, I envy you, indeed I do!
It ain't that you're tricky with your feet,
But it's those centres that you send in
Which Turnbull then heads in,
Oh, I wish I was you,
Indeed I do
Indeed I do"

— One of the popular songs sung on the terraces at Hyde Road.

City dominated the Second Division in the 1898–99 season and won promotion as champions. Helping them to keep them in winning ways in the close season was late signing Jimmy Ross, a veteran forward who Meredith considered to be his "favourite hero". Meredith claimed 30 goals in 34 games, including hat-tricks against Grimsby Town, Loughborough, Darwen and Barnsley.

Meredith scored City's first goal in the First Division on the opening day of the 1899–1900 season in a 4–3 defeat to Blackburn Rovers at Ewood Park on 2 September. Seven days later he claimed two goals in a 4–0 home victory over Derby County, and "led the field that day" by dribbling the ball almost the whole length of the pitch before launching a powerful shot that settled into the corner of Jack Fryer's net. The Athletic News reported that "for real brilliance the right-wing [Meredith and Ross] took the biscuit".

First Division defences managed to limit Meredith's contribution in the 1900–01 campaign by singling him out for rough treatment, though Liverpool manager Tom Watson felt compelled to write a letter to Manchester City denying that a Liverpool director had stated that "all that the opposition had to do was watch Meredith – the rest are no good". He finished the season with just seven goals in 35 appearances.

Meredith found the net eight times in 37 games in the 1901–02 campaign, as City were relegated back out of the First Division. The club's secretary, Sam Ormerod, selected 29 different players as the club slumped to defeat in 13 of the opening 20 games. Ormerod was forced to step down as new business figures took control behind the scenes and began to sign promising young Scottish players. New manager Tom Maley was more willing than his predecessor to confront Meredith over his tendency to stray out of position and attempt to dominate the City attack.

City won immediate promotion as Second Division champions in 1902–03, with Meredith scoring 23 goals in 35 appearances and claiming a hat-trick against Chesterfield Town. Maley found him a suitable inside-right partner in Jimmy Bannister, who was unselfish in his play and willing to feed the ball through to Meredith. He also played Sammy Frost at half-back, who was able to win the ball and bring Meredith into the play, and signed outside-left Frank Booth to balance the attack. Maley encouraged teamwork, meaning there was less pressure on Meredith from opposition defenders.

Meredith was partnered with George Livingstone for the 1903–04 campaign, who was able to supply him and the rest of the team with quality passes. Drawn against a strong Sunderland club in the first round of the FA Cup, Meredith was the "raider-in-chief" as City claimed a 3–2 victory at Hyde Road. City then defeated Woolwich Arsenal and Middlesbrough to reach the semi-finals. There they faced The Wednesday at Goodison Park, and Meredith scored one goal (bundled in by Gillespie) and claimed two assists as City won the game 3–1. Their opponents in the final at Crystal Palace were mid-table Second Division club Bolton Wanderers, and Meredith was cautiously optimistic before the match, stating "We ought to win ... if we play anything like our normal game the cup is ours ... but this is the cup final and, well, anything might happen." With just over 20 minutes played, Livingstone found Meredith with a long ball, who then beat goalkeeper Dai Davies to score the only goal of the game; Bolton supporters long maintained that Meredith had been offside. As captain, Meredith was handed the trophy by Prime Minister Arthur Balfour.

He scored ten goals in 35 games in the 1904–05 season, as City came within two points and two places of champions Newcastle United. The season ended in controversial circumstances at Villa Park. With a 3–2 defeat to Aston Villa ending any hopes of winning the league, Sandy Turnbull and Villa captain Alex Leake exchanged blows. The Football Association launched an investigation into the violence, and the findings shocked the sporting world as Meredith was suspended for the entirety of the 1905–06 season for (unsuccessfully) attempting to bribe Alex Leake. No evidence was taken from Meredith, who denied the charge, and the evidence was not made public. The club, fearful of FA sanctions, refused to pay Meredith during the campaign. He was transfer listed in May 1906 after he claimed that he had only attempted to bribe Leake on the orders of manager Tom Maley and that illegal payments were common practice at Hyde Road. The FA acted on his information, and fined Manchester City £900 for illegal payments and suspended numerous players, boardroom members and staff members.

You approve of the severe punishment administered by the Commission AGAINST ME and state that the offence I committed at Aston Villa should have wiped me out of football forever. Why ME ALONE? when I was only the spokesman of others equally guilty.

— Meredith wrote an open letter to the Athletic News, justifying his decision to reveal the illegal actions of the club.

=== Manchester United ===
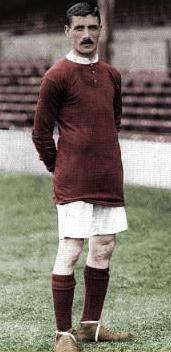
Meredith in Manchester United colours

In May 1906 while serving his ban, Meredith moved to Manchester United. He joined on a free transfer and received a £500 signing-on fee from United; Manchester City reluctantly accepted the transfer as they had previously signed an undertaking promising Meredith a benefit match, and he was willing to forego the agreement if the club granted his transfer. He returned from suspension on 1 January 1907 and marked his debut at Bank Street with an assist for Sandy Turnbull to score the only goal of the game against Aston Villa. In addition to Turnbull, Meredith was joined at United by former City teammates Jimmy Bannister and Herbert Burgess. This new forward line made the team into a powerful force, as they already possessed a dominant half-back line in captain Charlie Roberts, Dick Duckworth and Alex Bell. They ended the 1906–07 season in eighth place in the First Division.

Manager Ernest Mangnall signed Jimmy Turnbull, and the forward line of Meredith, Bannister, Jimmy Turnbull and Sandy Turnbull were dominant in the 1907–08 campaign. United won the title with a nine-point margin over second-placed Aston Villa, and secured the 1908 FA Charity Shield (the first ever Charity Shield) with a 4–0 win over Queens Park Rangers at Stamford Bridge.

United slipped to a disappointing 13th-place finish in 1908–09. Meredith was suspended for January in punishment for kicking a Brighton & Hove Albion player in an FA Cup match. The club reached the 1909 FA Cup final, knocking out Brighton, Everton, Blackburn Rovers, Burnley and Newcastle United. Their cup final opponents at Crystal Palace were Bristol City, captained at centre-half by Billy Wedlock – England captain and staunch opponent of the Players' Union. A Sandy Turnbull goal settled the tie, which was described as quite a boring game; Meredith himself dismissed reports of the match, stating "it was a good game for dashing, keen, thrilling football, great goalkeeping and narrow escapes at either end". Meredith and his teammates celebrated the victory with music hall stars such as George Robey.

United finished fifth in 1909–10 and exited the FA Cup in the first round with a defeat to Burnley at Turf Moor. However, the club continued to advance under the generous chairmanship of John Henry Davies, and Old Trafford was opened in February 1910.

Harold Halse was to partner Meredith at inside-right for the 1910–11 season but proved too much of a "free-spirit" and was replaced by Jack Picken, a "plodder [who] understands what Meredith requires". A defeat at Villa Park in the penultimate game of the season left United needing to beat third-place Sunderland and hope that Aston Villa failed to beat Liverpool. United were a goal down when Meredith provided Enoch West with a cross which West sent into the net for the equalising goal. Four more goals came and they won the game 5–1 and left the field as champions of England for the second time.

Meredith played in the 1911 FA Charity Shield, as United beat Swindon Town 8–4 at Stamford Bridge. However, the 1911–12 campaign ended in a disappointing 13th-place finish, and Mangnall left the club to manage rivals Manchester City. Meredith's Benefit match was played on 7 September 1912 between Manchester United and Manchester City, and the Welsh FA also donated the proceeds of two trial matches to the fund. There were 39,911 spectators and a total of £1,400 was raised.

New manager John Bentley led United to a fourth-place finish in 1912–13. He dropped Meredith to blood a young Jackie Sheldon. By this time, Meredith made headlines primarily due to his squabbling with the club over them stalling payment of his benefit matches and his dissatisfaction at being dropped. The club dropped to 14th spot in 1913–14 and only avoided relegation on the last day of the 1914–15 season after bribing Liverpool to lose 2–0 at Old Trafford; Meredith this time played no part in the resulting bribery scandal. He claimed to be baffled as to why his teammates refused to pass him during the game.

During the First World War, he played a match against United, making a guest appearance for Port Vale, with Vale recording a 5–2 victory at the Old Recreation Ground. Frustrated with the club for delaying payments over his benefit match, he also played as a guest for Manchester City. After the war ended, he demanded a free transfer and was repulsed that the club demanded a transfer fee, stating that the transfer market was a "degrading business" for players. On 26 April 1920, in a league match against Notts County, Meredith became the club's top appearance maker, overtaking George Wall with 320 caps to his name. On 7 May 1921, at 46 years, 281 days, he became United's oldest ever player when he took to the field in a league game against Derby County. His total of 335 appearances was Manchester United's record until 27 August 1928, when Joe Spence made 336th of his 510 appearances for the club.

=== Return to Manchester City ===
In 1921 he returned to Manchester City on a free transfer. He played 25 first-team games in the 1921–22 season, helping City to record a derby victory over rivals Manchester United. He featured once in the 1922–23 campaign, playing the club's final game at Hyde Road. He played four FA Cup and two First Division games in the 1923–24 season. Mangnall, now his manager at City, shocked Manchester when he selected Meredith for the cup game with Brighton & Hove Albion at the Goldstone Ground, but was vindicated with a 5–1 victory; Meredith also scored a goal, though this was due to a poor mistake from the Brighton goalkeeper. He played both games against Cardiff City in the next round, a 0–0 draw at Maine Road and 1–0 win at Ninian Park, and claimed an assist in the goal that settled the tie. His last match was against Newcastle United in the semi-finals at the age of 49 years and 245 days, making him City's oldest ever player; the game ended in a 2–1 defeat.

== International career ==
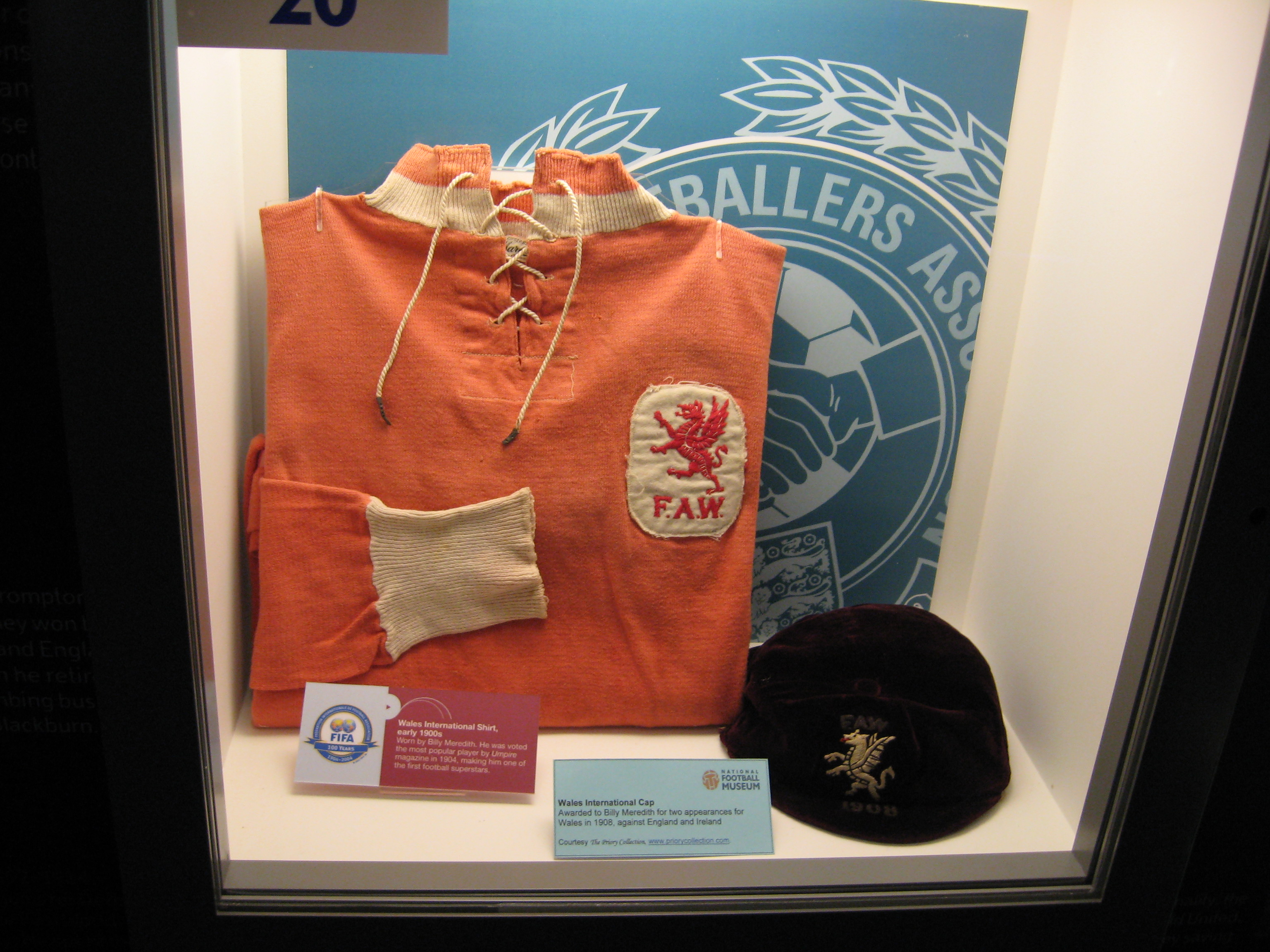
A Wales national team football shirt which was worn by Billy Meredith in the early 1900s, with Welsh cap. On display at the National Football Museum in Manchester.

Meredith won his first cap for Wales in a 2–2 draw with Ireland on 16 March 1895 in Belfast. He won 12 caps in the 1890s. Still, he was forced to miss six games as his club would not let him play in games that clashed with league fixtures. Wales could compete with Ireland but were regularly beaten by Scotland and England. On 26 March 1900, Wales played for the first time in South Wales, at Cardiff Arms Park, and Meredith scored a goal to earn the Welsh a celebrated 1–1 draw with England. After serving his suspension, he returned to Wales for the British Home Championship title victory in 1907, the nation's first success in the competition. In those three games, he scored against Ireland in a 3–2 victory and captained Wales to a 1–0 win over Scotland and a 1–1 draw with England. Wales were denied a late penalty against the English, and Meredith was later recorded to have said, "Never mind, little Wales will win some day [against England]. May I be there at the death."

After draws with Ireland and Scotland, Meredith "wept unashamedly" as he helped Wales to beat England 2–1 at Highbury to claim the 1920 British Home Championship. It was only his second victory against the English in 20 attempts, marking the last of his 48 caps. Though his record number of caps was later surpassed, at 45 years and 229 days, he remains the oldest player to win a Wales cap and an international call from any national team ever. He was actually chosen by the selectors for 71 consecutive matches, but only made 48 appearances as his clubs regularly refused to release him for international duty.

== Style of play ==
Meredith was able to avoid injury throughout his career despite the extremely physical nature of the game during the period. This was due in part to his extraordinary balance and agility, which allowed him to avoid clumsy challenges, and the toughness he had built up from spending his adolescence working in the mines. A model professional, he spent his spare time improving his game with extra training sessions and maintained peak physical fitness by avoiding alcohol and tobacco. His "gimmick" was to chew on a toothpick during matches, and this unusual trait was picked up on by cartoonists of the time.

Writing a 1947 critique of Stanley Matthews, Meredith criticised the lack of direct play on show in the 1940s and stated that when he was playing, "I knew what was expected of me – to beat the wing-half and the full-back, take the ball down to the corner flag and centre". His ball control skills were unparalleled, leaving opposition players unable to tackle him. He also was an extremely accurate passer and crosser of the ball. His dribbling and crossing gave him a large advantage over rival wingers, who relied solely on speed to beat opposition full-backs. In addition to wing-play, he was also highly skilled at sending in long-range shots across the face of the goal, and could be relied upon to meet crosses from his left-winger with a powerful volley.

Meredith had to deal with extremely physical defences and was often boxed into the corner of the pitch by as many as four players. As his talents became widely regarded, more well-organised defences would designate him with a man-marker, to try and isolate him from his teammates. This often left him reliant on an unselfish inside-right partner willing to fetch and carry the ball for him without expecting much goals or glory in return. A hard-working wing-half would also improve Meredith's effectiveness by winning the ball and sending him a pass down the flank. The best teams he played in also had a centre-forward able to make the most of his accurate crosses.

== Players' Union ==
"I have devoted myself to football, and I have become a better player than most men because I have denied myself much that men prize ... They congratulate me and give me caps but they will not give me a penny more than men are earning in the reserve team, some of them perhaps do not trouble themselves to improve themselves and don't worry about taking care of condition. If football is a man's livelihood and he does more than others for his employer, why is he not entitled to better pay than others? So far as I can make out, the sole reason why the best footballers in England are prevented from earning better than men of lesser ability and experience is purely sentimental."

— Meredith made a passionate and eloquent case for abandoning the maximum wage.

Meredith organised the first meeting of the Players' Union (PU) in December 1907. Meredith had previously been involved with the Association Footballers' Union (the "AFU"), the first attempt by football players in England to organise a trade union. Like the AFU before it, the Players' Union sought the relaxation of restrictions on transfers and wages. Others made the argument that a free market wage structure would ruin the amateur principles the sport was founded on, but Meredith felt that these words rang hollow considering that club directors and shareholders made vast profits. At the first annual meeting in December 1908, the PU stated their aims as to allow unlimited wages, the right to transfer from club to club, and for players to take a percentage of any transfer fee.

With the union threatening strike action, particularly at international matches, in April 1909, the Football Association insisted that all players agree to leave the union and pledge loyalty to the FA. Manchester United refused to issue the revised contracts to its players, and the FA suspended the entire squad. The club then refused to pay the players in lieu of their suspension, and so the players instead took away ornaments from the club's office before Mangnall persuaded them to return the items. The players continued to train, and captain Charlie Roberts came up with the name of Outcasts F.C. The FA organised a meeting of 200 players, excluding the Outcasts, but a rambling speech from chairman Charles Clegg failed to win them over, and an agreement was reached where the PU would be recognised by the FA.

In October 1909, the Union balloted its members over the organisation's membership of the General Federation of Trade Unions (GTFU). The result of the vote, a decisive "no" to GFTU support, effectively supported the FA's position that professional footballers were fundamentally different from workmen in other industries. Meredith resumed league football in November 1909, bemoaning his view that "many players refuse to take things seriously and continue to live a kind of schoolboy life".

== Personal life and legacy ==
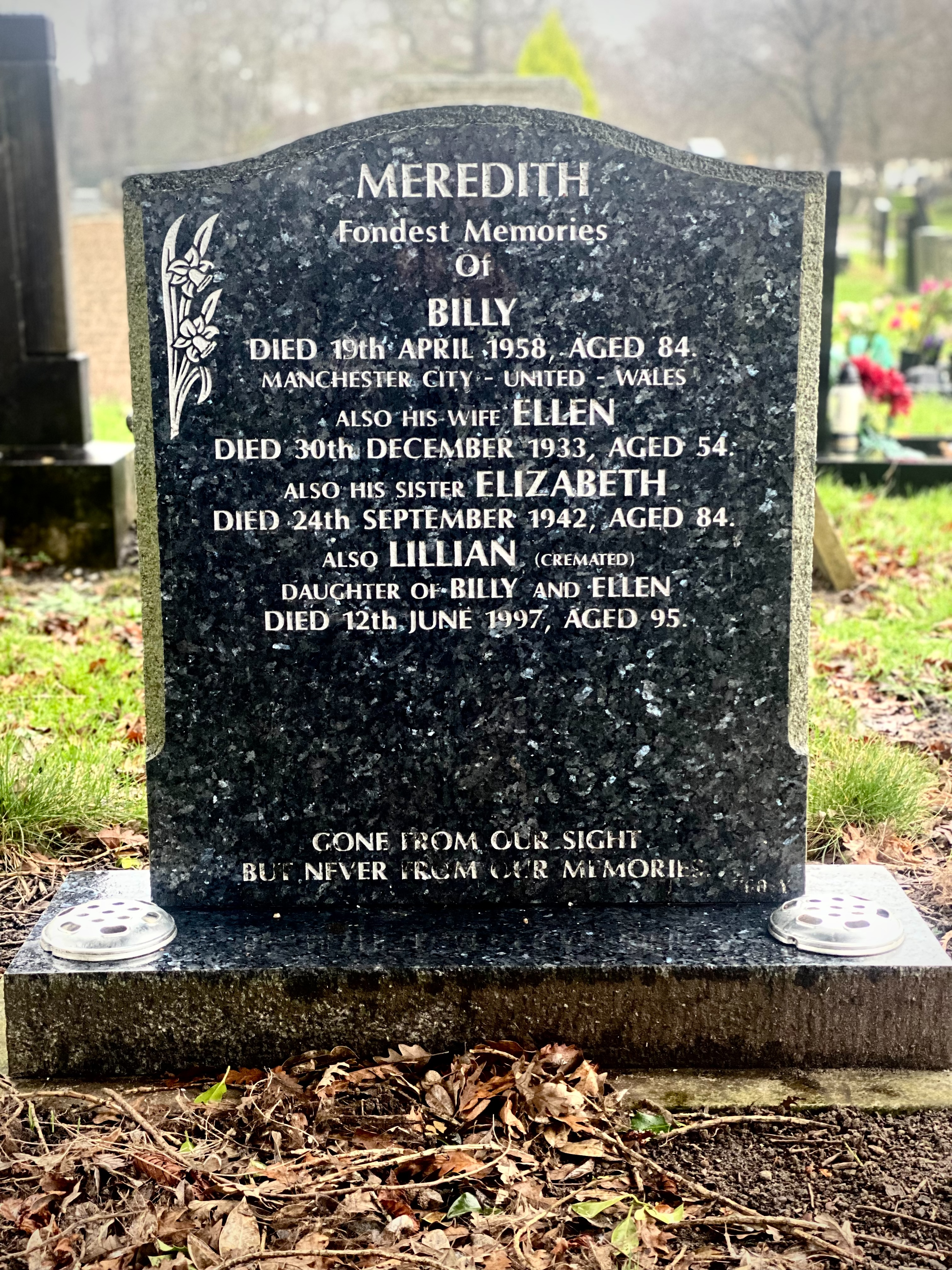
Billy Meredith's grave in Southern Cemetery, Manchester

He married Ellen Negus in 1901, and the couple had two daughters. He was a supporter of the Liberal Party. He ran businesses throughout his career, with little success, and was declared bankrupt in July 1909 after his clothing shop was damaged by fire. During the 1910s he ran a public house (despite being a teetotaller). He later pursued an interest in the film industry by buying shares in numerous Stretford cinemas in the 1930s. He also starred in the 1926 picture The Ball of Fortune, playing himself as a football trainer; the film received generally positive reviews. In 1928, together with former colleague Charlie Roberts, he became a coach for the ambitious but short-lived Manchester Central. Meredith's son-in-law, former City captain Charlie Pringle, was a player. He retained a passion for football and spent much of his retirement discussing the game with former colleagues and regulars at his hotel, the Stretford Road Hotel, which he ran from 1930 to 1945. He rarely missed the chance to attend a Wales game in the 1920s and 1930s.

Meredith died in Withington, Manchester in April 1958 at the age of 83, and was buried in Southern Cemetery, Manchester. After he spent many years in an unmarked grave, the Professional Footballers' Association, the Welsh FA, Manchester City and Manchester United all agreed to cover the cost of upkeep on a new headstone. Meredith is honoured in the hall of fame at the Etihad Stadium. It was announced in August 2007 that Meredith was one of the ten new inductees for 2007 to the English Football Hall of Fame. There is a street in Manchester named Billy Meredith Close in his honour and there are a pair of plaques dedicated to Meredith in his home village of Chirk (Cymraeg: Y Waun): one at Chirk AAA FC's home ground; the other in Millennium Gardens at the Station Avenue entrance to the park and cricket ground. The latter was unveiled in 2002 by Billy's daughter Winifrede.

== Career statistics ==
=== Club statistics ===
Appearances and goals by club, season and competition
Club	Season	League			FA Cup		Other		Total	
Club	Season	Division	Apps	Goals	Apps	Goals	Apps	Goals	Apps	Goals
Northwich Victoria	1893–94	Second Division	11	5	0	0	—		11	5
Manchester City	1894–95	Second Division	18	12	0	0	—		18	12
Manchester City	1895–96	Second Division	29	12	0	0	4 (Note: Appearance(s) in Football League test matches)	0	33	12
Manchester City	1896–97	Second Division	27	10	1	0	—		28	10
Manchester City	1897–98	Second Division	30	12	2	0	—		32	12
Manchester City	1898–99	Second Division	33	29	1	1	—		34	30
Manchester City	1899–1900	First Division	33	14	2	0	—		35	14
Manchester City	1900–01	First Division	34	7	1	0	—		35	7
Manchester City	1901–02	First Division	33	8	4	0	—		37	8
Manchester City	1902–03	Second Division	34	23	1	0	—		35	23
Manchester City	1903–04	First Division	34	11	6	2	—		40	13
Manchester City	1904–05	First Division	33	9	2	1	—		35	10
Manchester City	1905–06	First Division	0	0	0	0	—		0	0
Manchester City	Total		338	147	20	4	4	0	362	151
Manchester United	1906–07	First Division	16	5	2	0	—		18	5
Manchester United	1907–08	First Division	37	10	4	0	2 (Note: Appearance(s) in FA Charity Shield)	1	43	11
Manchester United	1908–09	First Division	34	0	4	0	—		38	0
Manchester United	1909–10	First Division	31	5	1	0	—		32	5
Manchester United	1910–11	First Division	35	5	3	0	—		38	5
Manchester United	1911–12	First Division	35	3	6	0	1	0	42	3
Manchester United	1912–13	First Division	22	2	5	0	—		27	2
Manchester United	1913–14	First Division	34	2	1	0	—		35	2
Manchester United	1914–15	First Division	26	0	1	0	—		27	0
Manchester United	1919–20	First Division	19	2	2	0	—		21	2
Manchester United	1920–21	First Division	14	1	0	0	—		14	1
Manchester United	Total		303	35	29	0	3	1	335	36
Manchester City	1921–22	First Division	25	1	0	0	—		25	1
Manchester City	1922–23	First Division	1	0	0	0	—		1	0
Manchester City	1923–24	First Division	2	0	4	1	—		6	1
Manchester City	Total		28	1	4	1	—		32	2
Career total			680	188	53	5	7	1	740	194

=== International statistics ===
Wales national team
Year	Apps	Goals
1895	2	0
1896	2	2
1897	3	2
1898	2	0
1899	1	0
1900	2	2
1901	2	0
1902	2	0
1903	3	0
1904	1	0
1905	2	1
1906	0	0
1907	3	1
1908	2	0
1909	3	1
1910	3	0
1911	3	0
1912	3	0
1913	3	1
1914	3	0
1915	0	0
1916	0	0
1917	0	0
1918	0	0
1919	0	0
1920	3	0
Total	48	10

== Honours ==
=== Club ===
Chirk

- Welsh Cup: 1894

Manchester City

- Second Division: 1898–99
- FA Cup: 1903–04

Manchester United

- First Division: 1907–08, 1910–11
- FA Cup: 1908–09
- FA Charity Shield: 1908, 1911

=== National team ===
Wales

- British Home Championship: 1907, 1920

=== Individual ===
- Football League 100 Legends: 1998 (inducted)
- English Football Hall of Fame: 2007 (inducted)

== See also ==
- List of men's footballers with the most official appearances
