= Frank Booth (English footballer) =

English footballer (1882–1919)

Personal information
- Full name: Frank Booth
- Date of birth: September 1882
- Place of birth: Hyde, England
- Date of death: 22 June 1919 (aged 36)
- Place of death: Chorlton-on-Medlock, England
- Position: Outside left

Youth career
- –1900: Hyde

Senior career*
Years	Team	Apps	(Gls)
1900–1901	Glossop	0	(0)
1901–1902	Stockport County	6	(1)
1902–1906	Manchester City	94	(18)
1906–1909	Bury	58	(4)
1909–1911	Clyde	44	(13)
1911–1912	Manchester City	4	(0)

International career
1905	England	1	(0)
- * Club domestic league appearances and goals

Frank Booth (September 1882 – 22 June 1919), also known as 'Tabby', was an English footballer who played in the Football League for Stockport County, Manchester City and Bury. He played in the outside left position. He had two spells as a Manchester City player between 1902 and 1906 and in 1911. In total he made 98 appearances for the team and scored 18 goals. He also won one cap for England.

== Career ==
Booth began his football career playing for Glossop and Stockport County.

=== Manchester City ===
In 1902 he joined Manchester City, a team which included the prolific Scottish centre forward Billie Gillespie and Welsh outside right Billy Meredith. He played 9 games in his first season for the club and helped earn the team promotion into the first division.

In the 1903–04 season Booth made 30 appearances and scored 4 goals. His first goal for the Manchester team came in a 4–1 victory against Wolverhampton Wanderers. Manchester City finished in second place that season, 3 points behind champions Sheffield Wednesday. The team also reached the final of the FA Cup where the defeated Bolton Wanderers 1–0 with a goal from Billy Meredith.

In the 1904–05 football season Booth scored 8 goals in 35 games for City and helped the team to third place in the league, two points behind champions Newcastle United. In the same season Booth won his only international cap for England in a 1–1 draw with Ireland. In the 1905–06 season he scored 7 goals in 29 appearances for City and the team finished fifth. At the end of the season the Football Association conducted an investigation into the finances of Manchester City and it was found that the team had made extra payments to all of their players. As a consequence Tom Maley was banned from football for life and 17 players were fined and suspended until January 1907. Manchester City were forced to sell their players and Frank Booth was sold to Bury in 1906.

=== Bury, Clyde ===
In two seasons at Bury Booth appeared 58 times and scored 4 goals. He then played for Clyde in the Scottish Football League, playing in their 1911 Scottish Cup Final defeat to Dundee (he scored in the first game of the tie, which was eventually settled after a second replay).

=== Return to Manchester City ===
In the 1911–12 football season Booth returned to Manchester City and made four appearances before retiring.

== Personal life ==
Booth was married with two children. In December 1915, over a year after the outbreak of the First World War, Booth attested under the Derby Scheme. He was called into the Royal Garrison Artillery in April 1917 and after service in Britain, he was posted to France in March 1918. After the armistice, Booth returned to Britain in February 1919, but died of an inoperable heart tumour at Manchester Royal Infirmary on 22 June 1919. He was buried in a military grave in Denton Cemetery.

== Honours ==
Manchester City

- Football League Second Division: 1902–03
- FA Cup: 1903–04

Clyde

- Scottish Cup: Runners-up 1909–10,
- Glasgow Merchants Charity Cup: 1909–10
