= Tommy Rodway =

English footballer

Personal information
- Full name: Thomas William Rodway
- Date of birth: 6 January 1879
- Place of birth: Dudley, England
- Date of death: 1953 (aged 70–71)
- Position: Full back

Senior career*
| Years | Team | Apps | (Gls) |
| 1902–1903 | Wellingborough | | |
| 1903–1915 | Preston North End | 335 | (9) |
| 1919–1920 | Chorley | | |
| 1920–1921 | Fleetwood | | |
| 1921 | Dick, Kerr's XI | | |
| Total | | 335 | (9) |
- * Club domestic league appearances and goals

Thomas William Rodway (6 January 1879 – 1959) was an English footballer who played in the Football League for Preston North End.
