= 1905 English football bribery scandal =

Sport scandal in England

The 1905 English football bribery scandal was an event of corruption that surfaced at the conclusion of the 1904–05 football season in England. It centred on the accusations that Manchester City player Billy Meredith had offered a rival player from Aston Villa a bribe to purposely lose their final league match of the season between the teams.

It resulted in the Manchester City manager (Tom Maley) and former chairman (W. Forrest) being banned from English football sine die, two directors (Allison and Davies) suspended for seven months, a further five directors dismissed, and a total of 17 players banned from ever playing for the club again. Among the players was Billy Meredith, who was banned from football for 18 months and transferred to City's local rivals Manchester United before the end of his ban.

== Key figures ==
Billy Meredith had played for Manchester City since 1894. He was the key participant in the 1905 scandal, where he allegedly tried to bribe Alex Leake, a rival player with Aston Villa, a sum of £10 (worth over £1,090 in 2026) to throw the final match of the 1904–05 English football season (City were in contention for the title, while Villa had dropped out of the running). Aston Villa won the match 3–2. After losing the match and thus any hopes of winning the league, Manchester City player Sandy Turnbull physically fought with Alex Leake, and the resulting investigation into the violence revealed the bribery scandal, Leake turning Meredith in to The Football Association when asked about the incident; however, Meredith always pleaded innocence. Although no evidence was taken from Meredith, he was suspended for one year and fined. Manchester City refused to pay him, as they did not want to upset the Football Association, and Meredith retaliated by exposing Manchester City's illegal payments to their players of over £4 (which was the set wage given at the time). In his statement to the press, he said, "What was the secret of the success of the Manchester City team? In my opinion, the fact that the club put aside the rule that no player should receive more than four pounds a week... The team delivered the goods, the club paid for the goods delivered and both sides were satisfied" As a result, he claimed, "You approve of the severe punishment administered by the Commission AGAINST ME and state that the offence I committed at Aston Villa should have wiped me out of football forever. Why ME ALONE? when I was only the spokesman of others equally guilty" in a letter to the Athletic News.

After the Football Association looked into and verified Meredith's accusations of overpaying players, Manchester City's manager Tom Maley was suspended from football for life. Maley was pointed out by name by Meredith, who claimed that Maley ordered him to bribe Leake, also stating that corruption was common among Manchester City's administration.

== Aftermath ==
As a result of the scandal at Manchester City, the club was forced to pay £900. 17 players were fined individually and were suspended until New Year's Day 1907. The Football Association also forced Manchester City to auction off all of their players at the Queen's Hotel in Manchester. Manchester United's manager, Ernest Mangnall, bought up many of the most talented players, including Billy Meredith (for £500), Herbert Burgess, Sandy Turnbull, and Jimmy Bannister. In fact, Meredith moved to Manchester United in May 1906, while still banned; he soon became the heart of the United team as they proceeded to win the 1907–08 championship. All of the Manchester City players' bans were lifted on 31 December 1906.

== See also ==
- History of Manchester City F.C. (1880–1928)
