= John Miller (footballer, born 1878) =

Scottish footballer

Personal information
- Full name: John Miller
- Date of birth: 1878
- Place of birth: Maryhill, Scotland
- Position: Winger

Senior career*
Years	Team	Apps	(Gls)
- Birtley Colliery
1899–1901	Burnley	18	(2)
- * Club domestic league appearances and goals

John Miller (1878 – unknown) was a Scottish professional footballer who played as a winger.
