= Herbert Burgess =

English footballer and manager

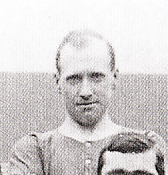

Personal information
- Full name: Herbert Larry Burgess
- Date of birth: 25 February 1883
- Place of birth: Openshaw, Manchester, England
- Date of death: 23 September 1961 (age 78)
- Place of death: Ashton, Lancashire, England
- Position: Left back

Youth career
- Glossop North End

Senior career*
Years	Team	Apps	(Gls)
1903–1906	Manchester City	85	(2)
1906–1910	Manchester United	49	(0)
- Kristiania F.C.
1914–1918	MTK Budapest		

International career
1904–1906	England	4	(0)

Managerial career
- 1921–1922: MTK Budapest
- 1922–1926: Padova
- 1926–1928: Milan
- 1928–1930: Padova
- 1930–1932: Roma
- * Club domestic league appearances and goals

Herbert Larry Burgess (25 February 1883 – 23 September 1961) was an English footballer.

Born in Openshaw, Manchester, Burgess began his football career with Glossop North End, but soon signed for Manchester City. He made his debut for City on 5 September 1903, playing at left back away to Stoke City on the opening day of the 1903–04 season. In 1906, in the wake of a scandal regarding players' wages, Manchester City were forced into selling most of their players, and Burgess was purchased by Manchester United along with Sandy Turnbull, Jimmy Bannister and Billy Meredith. After helping the club to the 1907–08 Football League title, Burgess left the club and moved to Denmark to play for Kristiania. He then immigrated to Hungary, where he played for MTK Budapest, before becoming their manager. In the 1920s, Burgess' managerial career took him to Italy, where he became the manager of Padova. He had a two-year spell at Milan before returning to Padova, but two years later he was on the move again, this time to Roma.

Burgess was capped four times for England.
