= Tommy Hynds =

Scottish footballer

Personal information
- Full name: Thomas Hynds
- Date of birth: 5 November 1880
- Place of birth: Hurlford, Scotland
- Date of death: 1944 (aged 63–64)
- Position: Centre half

Senior career*
Years	Team	Apps	(Gls)
–	Hurlford Thistle		
1898–1902	Celtic	28	(2)
1899	→ Bolton Wanderers (loan)	8	(0)
1899	→ Clyde (loan)	4	(0)
1900	→ Bolton Wanderers (loan)		
1901–1902	→ Manchester City (loan)	29	(2)
1902–1906	Manchester City	129	(7)
1907	Woolwich Arsenal	13	(0)
1907–1908	Leeds City	37	(0)
1908–1910	Heart of Midlothian	35	(4)

International career
1901	Scottish League XI	1	(0)
- * Club domestic league appearances and goals

Thomas Hynds (5 November 1880 – 1944) was a Scottish footballer.

Born in Hurlford in Ayrshire, Hynds started out as a centre half at Celtic, but was mainly a reserve; his time there included two loan spells at Bolton Wanderers in 1899 and 1900, and a short loan at Clyde in 1899. It is known that he was presented with a Scottish Cup winner's medal from 1899, although he only played in one match during the run.

He left the Glasgow side to join Manchester City in September 1901. His City debut came on 5 October 1901 in a 2–0 defeat against Notts County at Trent Bridge. In five seasons he played 171 matches for City, scoring nine goals and helped them to win the Second Division in 1902–03 and the FA Cup in 1903–04; such was his value to the club he was reportedly paid more than their star player, Billy Meredith.

However, the club was engulfed in an illegal payments scandal and Hynds was banned from football for four months and fined £75. While still under suspension, he was transferred to Woolwich Arsenal in December 1906. He made his debut on 1 January 1907 against Sheffield Wednesday but spent just five months at the club, displacing Percy Sands from the centre half position for 13 League matches and four FA Cup ties, as Arsenal reached the semi-finals of the 1906–07 competition. He scored one goal for the club.

Hynds left Arsenal in May 1907, playing a single season for Leeds City (where he was also captain), before returning to Scotland to play for Heart of Midlothian in 1908, where he played 39 league and Scottish Cup matches. He later coached abroad, in British Columbia and Italy. Hynds's brother John also attempted a football career, but did not progress beyond the Manchester City reserve team.

Hynds represented the Scottish League once in February 1901, although at club level he had not featured for the Celtic first team for several weeks prior. While with Manchester City he played in the Home Scots v Anglo-Scots annual trial match in 1905, and during his time at Arsenal was invited to take part again (along with four team-mates) in the 1907 edition; neither appearance led on to a full international cap for Scotland.
