= 1903–04 FA Cup =

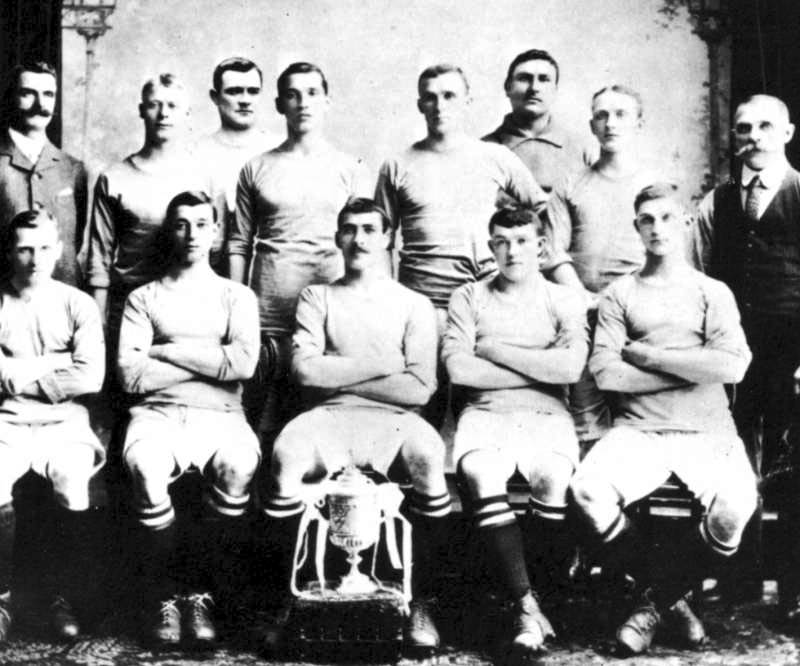
- The Manchester City team following the club's first FA Cup victory

Tournament details
- Country: England

Final positions
- Champions: Manchester City (1st title)
- Runners-up: Bolton Wanderers

The 1903–04 FA Cup was the 33rd season of the world's oldest association soccer competition, the Soccer Association Challenge Cup (more usually known as the FA Cup). Manchester City, despite never having advanced past the second round before, won the competition for the first time, beating Bolton Wanderers 1–0 in the final at Crystal Palace, through a goal scored by Billy Meredith.

Matches were scheduled to be played at the stadium of the team named first on the date specified for each round, which was always a Saturday. If scores were level after 90 minutes had been played, a replay would take place at the stadium of the second-named team later the same week. If the replayed match was drawn further replays would be held at neutral venues until a winner was determined. If scores were level after 90 minutes had been played in a replay, a 30-minute period of extra time would be played.

== Calendar ==
The format of the FA Cup for the season had two preliminary rounds, five qualifying rounds, an intermediate round, three proper rounds, and the semi-finals and final.

Round	Date
Extra Preliminary Round	Saturday 12 September 1903
Preliminary Round	Saturday 19 September 1903
First Round Qualifying	Saturday 4 October 1903
Second Round Qualifying	Saturday 17 October 1903
Third Round Qualifying	Saturday 31 October 1903
Fourth Round Qualifying	Saturday 14 November 1903
Fifth Round Qualifying	Saturday 28 November 1903
Intermediate Round	Saturday 12 December 1903
First Round Proper	Saturday 6 February 1904
Second Round Proper	Saturday 20 February 1904
Third Round Proper	Saturday 5 March 1904
Semi-finals	Saturday 19 March 1904
Final	Saturday 23 April 1904

== Qualifying rounds ==
This season's competition was notable for the addition of an extra preliminary round to the qualifying stages for the first time. 14 clubs from the south-east of England and 10 clubs from the north-east were required to enter the competition at this stage due to the large number of teams from those areas now seeking to participate in the tournament. The most successful club from this stage was Essex side Leytonstone who progressed to the third qualifying round where they were defeated by Clapton.

The 10 clubs to progress through to the Intermediate Round from the fifth qualifying round were Burton United, Gainsborough Trinity and Burslem Port Vale from the Football League Second Division and non-league sides Stockton, Darwen, Shrewsbury Town, Fulham, Brentford, West Ham United and Plymouth Argyle. Fulham and Plymouth Argyle were qualifying for the main competition for the first time, while Shrewsbury Town had only previously featured at this stage in 1887-88 (the season before qualifying rounds were introduced).

== Intermediate Round ==
The Intermediate Round featured 10 ties played between the winners from the fifth qualifying round and 10 teams given byes. Small Heath from the Football League First Division and Manchester United, Bristol City, Preston North End, Woolwich Arsenal, Barnsley and Grimsby Town from the Second Division were entered automatically into this round, as were Reading, Bristol Rovers and New Brompton from the Southern League.

The other Second Division sides had to gain entry to this round through qualifying rounds. Burton United and Bradford City were entered in the first qualifying round, while Glossop was entered in the second qualifying round but withdrew from the competition. Blackpool, Burnley, Burslem Port Vale, Chesterfield, Gainsborough Trinity, Leicester Fosse, Lincoln City and Stockport County were all entered in the third qualifying round.

The 10 matches were played on 12 December 1903. Four ties went to replays, with two going to a second replay and one, between Manchester United and Small Heath, to a third replay.

Tie no	Home team	Score	Away team	Date
1	Preston North End	2–1	Darwen	12 December 1903
2	Reading	1–0	Gainsborough Trinity	12 December 1903
3	Grimsby Town	2–0	Barnsley	12 December 1903
4	Burslem Port Vale	3–0	Burton United	12 December 1903
5	Stockton	2–1	Shrewsbury Town	12 December 1903
6	New Brompton	1–1	Bristol City	12 December 1903
Replay	Bristol City	5–2	New Brompton	16 December 1903
7	Brentford	1–1	Plymouth Argyle	12 December 1903
Replay	Plymouth Argyle	4–1	Brentford	16 December 1903
8	Bristol Rovers	1–1	Woolwich Arsenal	12 December 1903
Replay	Woolwich Arsenal	1–1	Bristol Rovers	16 December 1903
Replay	Bristol Rovers	0–1	Woolwich Arsenal	21 December 1903
9	West Ham United	0–1	Fulham	12 December 1903
10	Manchester United	1–1	Small Heath	12 December 1903
Replay	Small Heath	1–1	Manchester United	16 December 1903
Replay	Small Heath	1–1	Manchester United	21 December 1903
Replay	Manchester United	3–1	Small Heath	11 January 1904

== First Round Proper ==
The First Round Proper featured 16 ties between 32 teams. 17 of the 18 First Division sides were given a bye to this round, as were Bolton Wanderers from the Second Division, and non-league Southampton, Portsmouth, Millwall Athletic and Tottenham Hotspur. They joined the ten teams who won in the Intermediate Round.

The matches were played on 6 February 1904. Four matches were drawn, with the replays taking place in the following midweek.

Tie no	Home team	Score	Away team	Date
1	Bristol City	1–3	Sheffield United	6 February 1904
2	Bury	2–1	Newcastle United	6 February 1904
3	Preston North End	1–0	Grimsby Town	6 February 1904
4	Southampton	3–0	Burslem Port Vale	6 February 1904
5	Stoke	2–3	Aston Villa	6 February 1904
6	Reading	1–1	Bolton Wanderers	6 February 1904
Replay	Bolton Wanderers	3–2	Reading	10 February 1904
7	Notts County	3–3	Manchester United	6 February 1904
Replay	Manchester United	2–1	Notts County	10 February 1904
8	Blackburn Rovers	3–1	Liverpool	6 February 1904
9	West Bromwich Albion	1–1	Nottingham Forest	10 February 1904
Replay	Nottingham Forest	3–1	West Bromwich Albion	13 February 1904
10	Everton	1–2	Tottenham Hotspur	6 February 1904
11	Stockton	1–4	Wolverhampton Wanderers	6 February 1904
12	Woolwich Arsenal	1–0	Fulham	6 February 1904
13	Manchester City	3–2	Sunderland	6 February 1904
14	Portsmouth	2–5	Derby County	6 February 1904
15	Plymouth Argyle	2–2	The Wednesday	6 February 1904
Replay	The Wednesday	2–0	Plymouth Argyle	10 February 1904
16	Millwall Athletic	0–2	Middlesbrough	6 February 1904

== Second Round Proper ==
The eight Second Round Proper matches were scheduled for 20 February 1904. There was one replay – between Derby County and Wolverhampton Wanderers – played in the following midweek, but this was again drawn and went to a second replay a week later. Tottenham were drawn at home to play Aston Villa, the match started on 20 February but abandoned with the score at 1–0 in Villa's favour after crowd trouble. The FA ordered the game to be replayed at Villa Park and fined Tottenham £350.

Tie no	Home team	Score	Away team	Date
1	Bury	1–2	Sheffield United	20 February 1904
2	Preston North End	0–3	Middlesbrough	20 February 1904
3	Blackburn Rovers	3–1	Nottingham Forest	20 February 1904
4	Aston Villa	0–1	Tottenham Hotspur	25 February 1904
5	The Wednesday	6–0	Manchester United	20 February 1904
6	Bolton Wanderers	4–1	Southampton	20 February 1904
7	Derby County	2–2	Wolverhampton Wanderers	20 February 1904
Replay	Wolverhampton Wanderers	2–2	Derby County	24 February 1904
Replay	Derby County	1–0	Wolverhampton Wanderers	29 February 1904
8	Woolwich Arsenal	0–2	Manchester City	20 February 1904

== Third Round Proper ==
The four Third Round Proper matches were scheduled for 5 March 1904. Two matches were drawn and replayed in the following midweek.

Tie no	Home team	Score	Away team	Date
1	Derby County	2–1	Blackburn Rovers	5 March 1904
2	Sheffield United	0–2	Bolton Wanderers	5 March 1904
3	Tottenham Hotspur	1–1	The Wednesday	5 March 1904
Replay	The Wednesday	2–0	Tottenham Hotspur	9 March 1904
4	Manchester City	0–0	Middlesbrough	5 March 1904
Replay	Middlesbrough	1–3	Manchester City	9 March 1904

== Semi-finals ==
The semi-final matches were played on 19 March 1904.

19 March 1904
15:00

Bolton Wanderers	1–0	Derby County

Molineux Stadium, Wolverhampton

19 March 1904
15:00

Manchester City	3–0	The Wednesday

Goodison Park, Liverpool

== Final ==
The final was the first to be contested by two teams from Lancashire: Manchester City and Bolton Wanderers. It was played at Crystal Palace on 23 April 1904. Manchester City won the match 1–0, Billy Meredith scoring the only goal.

=== Match details ===
23 April 1904
15:00 GMT

Manchester City	1–0	Bolton Wanderers
Meredith 23'

Crystal Palace, London
Attendance: 61,374
Referee: A. J. Barker

Manchester City	Bolton Wanderers

== See also ==
- FA Cup Final Results 1872-
