= Di Jones =

Welsh footballer

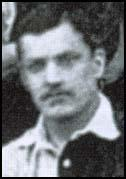
- Di Jones in 1890

Personal information
- Full name: David Jones
- Date of birth: 1867
- Place of birth: Trefonen, Shropshire, England
- Date of death: 27 August 1902 (aged 34–35)
- Place of death: England
- Position: Full back

Senior career*
| Years | Team | Apps | (Gls) |
| 1882 | Oswestry | | |
| 1883 | Chirk | | |
| 1887 | Newton Heath | 0 | (0) |
| 1888–1898 | Bolton Wanderers | 228 | (4) |
| 1898–1902 | Manchester City | 114 | (1) |
| Total | | 342 | (5) |

International career
| 1888–1900 | Wales | 14 | (0) |
- * Club domestic league appearances and goals

David "Di" Jones (1867 – 27 August 1902) was a Welsh footballer who played as a full-back for Oswestry, Chirk, Bolton Wanderers and Manchester City in the late 19th century. He also won 14 caps for the Welsh national team.

== Career ==
=== Club career ===
Jones was born in Trefonen, Shropshire to Lot Jones, a coal miner and labourer. His nephew was the footballer, Lot Jones.

He began his career with Oswestry in 1882 and helped them win the Shropshire Cup. Jones moved to Chirk, with whom he won the Welsh Cup in 1887 and 1888, the latter as captain. He was then persuaded to join Newton Heath. However, he soon moved on to Bolton Wanderers in March 1888 after just two friendly appearances for the Heathens.

Jones was noted for his strong tackling and ability to kick with either foot, and he was capable of plying in either full–back position, though he normally appeared at left–back.

Di Jones, playing as a full–back, made his League and Bolton Wanderers debut on 22 September 1888 at Deepdale, the home of Preston North End. Bolton Wanderers were defeated by the home team 3–1. Di Jones appeared in 12 of the 22 League matches played by Bolton Wanderers in season 1888–89. With Jones in the team, Bolton kept one clean sheet and conceded a single goal on 11 occasions.

At Bolton, he captained the side in the 1894 FA Cup Final, but finished on the losing side as Notts County defeated Wanderers 4–1. In ten years at Bolton, Jones made a total of 228 appearances and scored four goals, before moving to Manchester City, where his former Chirk teammate Billy Meredith was a player. He made his Manchester City debut against Luton Town on 8 October 1898. In his first season at City the club won promotion to the First Division, the highest level of English football. He scored one goal in 114 appearances for City.

=== International career ===
Jones made his debut for the Wales national team on 3 March 1888, playing at right-half in an 11–0 victory over Ireland at Wrexham. In a 12-year international career, Jones made a total of 16 appearances, but two, against Canada in 1891, were uncapped. His final Wales appearance came on 26 March 1900, a 1–1 draw with England in which he played at right-back.

== Personal life and death ==
On 17 August 1902, Jones was playing in a pre-season practice match when he suffered a cut to his knee after falling on a piece of glass. The wound became infected, and Jones died of blood poisoning and lockjaw on 27 August.
