= Sam Ormerod =

English footballer, referee, and manager

Samuel Ormerod (1848–1906) was an English football player, referee and manager.

In the early years of football Ormerod was an influential figure in his home town, first as a player and then as one of the men who formed Accrington F.C., which later became one of the founder members of the Football League. By 1883 he was a referee. Officiating a Bolton Wanderers match in November 1883, he was chased from the ground by a mob and assaulted at the railway station, an event which led the Football Association to threaten Bolton with expulsion.

In 1895 Ormerod was appointed manager of Manchester City, succeeding Joshua Parlby. In his first season in charge the club finished second in the Second Division, qualifying for the Test Matches, a nineteenth-century equivalent of the promotion play-offs. The club won only one of their four test matches, and failed to gain promotion. The following season was less successful with a sixth-place finish for the club.

During Ormerod's tenure City's style of play combined physical defending with an attack spearheaded by Billie Gillespie and Billy Meredith. Gillespie was an Ormerod signing, who came to the club from Lincoln City in 1897. A third-place finish was achieved in 1898, and in 1898–99 Ormerod's City won the Second Division championship, earning automatic promotion to the First Division, the highest level of English football. This was the first time the Manchester club had achieved promotion.

City's debut season in the top flight resulted in a comfortable finish in the upper mid-table, and this successful period earned Ormerod the nickname "The Wizard of Longsight". However, the club finished bottom of the First Division in the 1901–02 season and were relegated. This, coupled with club debts of £1,000, led to Ormerod resigning in July 1902. After leaving the club he became manager of Stockport County. In 1904 his former club invited him to travel to the FA Cup final as a thank you for his work. He later managed Clapton Orient. He died in 1906 shortly after his departure from Clapton.
