= Billie Gillespie =

Scottish footballer

Personal information
- Full name: William Jardine Gillespie
- Date of birth: 2 October 1873
- Place of birth: Glasgow, Scotland
- Date of death: 1942 (aged 67–68)
- Place of death: United States
- Position: Centre forward

Senior career*
Years	Team	Apps	(Gls)
- Strathclyde
1895–1897	Lincoln City	37	(16)
1897–1905	Manchester City	218	(126)
- * Club domestic league appearances and goals

William Jardine Gillespie (2 October 1873 – 1942) was a Scottish footballer who played as a centre forward for Lincoln City and Manchester City. Gillespie is tied alongside Fred Tilson as Man City's ninth highest goalscorer of all time.

== Career ==
Gillespie was born in Bridgeton, Glasgow on 2 October 1873. He began his football career playing for his local team Strathclyde. In 1895 he signed for Lincoln City who were then in the Second Division of the English Football League, playing alongside his elder brother Matt. Billie scored an eventual 16 goals in 37 games for the imps.

=== Manchester City ===
In January 1897 Gillespie signed for Manchester City who were also in the second tier of English football. He formed an effective partnership with the Welsh outside right Billy Meredith. He scored his first goal for City in a 3–1 defeat to Darwen. In his first season for the Manchester team he made 11 appearances and scored four times. The team finished sixth in the league, 10 points behind winners Notts County.

In the 1897–98 season Gillespie was City's leading scorer with 18 goals in 30 games, helping the team to third in the second division, nine points behind winners Burnley. In the following season, the 1898–99 football season, he was the club's second leading goalscorer with 17 goals and helped City, who were only defeated twice in the entire season, to earn promotion to the First Division. Billy Meredith was the team's leading goalscorer with 29 goals. With Gillespie's brother Matt having joined Newton Heath, they met on opposite sides in the Manchester derby until City's promotion.

In the 1899–1900 football season Gillespie scored eight goals and was City's third highest goalscorer. The team finished in seventh place that season. Gillespie's first goal in the top tier of English football came in a 4–0 victory over Derby County. In the 1900–01 season Gillespie found his place in the team challenged by Joe Cassidy who was the team's leading goalscorer with 14 goals that season. However Cassidy moved to Middlesbrough after a wage dispute. Gillespie had managed to score nine goals in 23 appearances that season.

In the 1901–02 football season Gillespie was the team's top scorer with 15 goals in 24 games. However, City finished in 18th place with only 28 points and were consigned to the Second Division once more. As a consequence, Sam Ormerod resigned as Manchester City manager and was succeeded by Tom Maley, who strengthened the team by purchasing Billy Lot Jones, Sandy Turnbull and Jimmy Bannister and they immediately earned promotion in the 1902–03 season by winning the Second Division championship. The team scored 95 goals in 34 games that season and Gillespie was the Second Division's top scorer with 30 goals.

In the 1903–04 season, Gillespie was City's top league goalscorer with 18 goals as the team finished in second place in the First Division, three points behind champions Sheffield Wednesday. City had defeated Wednesday 3–0 in the semi-final of that season's FA Cup, with a brace from Sandy Turnbull and one goal from Gillespie. City played Bolton Wanderers in the 1904 FA Cup Final and won 1–0 to win their first major trophy; the only goal of the game was scored by Billy Meredith.

In the 1904–05 football season, Gillespie was the team's fourth top scorer with seven league goals in 16 games (behind Sandy Turnbull who scored 19 goals, and Billy Meredith and Frank Booth who both scored eight). Manchester City finished third in the league that season, two points behind champions Newcastle United. At the end of the season the Football Association conducted an investigation into the financial activities of Manchester City and discovered that the team had been paying their players extra. The FA ruled that manager Tom Maley should be suspended from football for life while seventeen players were fined and suspended until January 1907. Gillespie refused to pay his fine and instead emigrated to the United States. In 231 League and FA Cup games for City he had scored 132 goals.

== Later life ==
Gillespie lived the rest of his life in Lynn, Massachusetts. He continued his association with the game of football by coaching a team at Harvard University. He died in 1942.

== Honours ==
Manchester City

- FA Cup: 1904
- Football League Second Division champions: 1898–99, 1902–03
