= Sandy Turnbull =

Scottish footballer

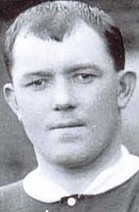

Personal information
- Full name: Alexander Turnbull
- Date of birth: 30 July 1884
- Place of birth: Hurlford, Scotland
- Date of death: 3 May 1917 (aged 32)
- Place of death: Arras, France
- Position: Inside forward

Youth career
- Hurlford Thistle

Senior career*
Years	Team	Apps	(Gls)
1902–1906	Manchester City	110	(53)
1906–1915	Manchester United	220	(90)
- → Rochdale (guest)
- → Clapton Orient (guest)
Total		330	(143)
- * Club domestic league appearances and goals

Alexander "Sandy" Turnbull (30 July 1884 – 3 May 1917) was a Scottish footballer who played as a forward for both Manchester City and Manchester United in the early 20th century. He was killed in action during the First World War.

== Football career ==
Born in Hurlford to James and Jessie Turnbull of 1 Gibson Street, Kilmarnock, Ayrshire, Turnbull started his football career with his hometown club, Hurlford Thistle. He later moved to Manchester City. In 1905, City was found guilty of malpractice relating to payments of its players, and the entire squad was suspended from playing football. When the ban was lifted on 31 December 1906, Turnbull moved to City's crosstown rivals Manchester United, along with Billy Meredith, Herbert Burgess and Jimmy Bannister. His first game for United came on the next day, 1 January 1907, against Aston Villa. Along with Meredith, he helped the club to their first championship in 1908 and the 1909 FA Cup, scoring the only goal in the final, against Bristol City. In 1908 alone, he would score 27 goals in 25 games. On 19 February 1910, Turnbull scored the first ever goal at Old Trafford, in a 4–3 loss against Liverpool. He would go on to score 100 goals for the club in 245 games. His final game for the Reds came against Sheffield United in 1915.

Turnbull received a lifelong ban from football in 1915 along with several others players after being found guilty of match-fixing. He was posthumously re-instated in 1919.

== Military career ==
Turnbull enlisted in the 23rd Battalion of the Middlesex Regiment (2nd Football Battalion) during the First World War before being transferred to the 8th Battalion of the East Surrey Regiment. After being promoted to the rank of lance sergeant, Turnbull was killed during the Battle of Arras on 3 May 1917 aged 32. Turnbull's body, if recovered, was never identified. He is commemorated on the Arras memorial.

== Family ==
Turnbull was married and had four children. Two of Turnbull's sons, Alexander Jr. and Ronald, signed amateur forms with Manchester United in August 1932, but neither managed to follow in their father's footsteps and they were released before making an appearance for the club.

== Honours ==
=== Club ===
Manchester City

- FA Cup: 1903–04

Manchester United

- First Division: 1907–08, 1910–11
- FA Cup: 1908–09

== See also ==
- 1915 British football betting scandal
