= Tom Maley =

Scottish footballer and manager

Personal information
- Full name: Thomas Edward Maley
- Date of birth: November 8, 1864
- Place of birth: Portsmouth, England
- Date of death: August 24, 1935 (aged 70)
- Place of death: Glasgow, Scotland

Thomas Edward Maley (8 November 1864 – 24 August 1935) was a Scottish football player and manager.

Born in Portsmouth to a soldier from County Clare, Maley spent his entire playing career in Scotland, with Partick Thistle, Dundee Harp, Hibernian, Third Lanark and Celtic (playing on the losing side in the 1889 Scottish Cup Final). An amateur during his playing days, he worked as a school teacher and later governor. He left this role in 1902 to become manager of Manchester City, helping them to their first major honour, the 1903–04 FA Cup. He was involved in the 1905 English football bribery scandal which resulted in him being banned from football. After leaving City in 1906 he became manager of Bradford Park Avenue then later assisted Southport.

Two of Maley's brothers also found fame in the footballing world. Alex Maley was a manager with Clyde, Clydebank, Hibernian and Crystal Palace while Willie Maley was a Scottish international and later manager of Celtic between 1897 and 1940. It was on a visit to the family home in Cathcart in December 1887 to invite Tom Maley to join Celtic that Brother Walfrid and the rest of the Celtic deputation first met Willie Maley (Tom was out courting his wife-to-be), and their invitation to Willie to also come along was important in Celtic's history.

Maley died in 1935 and was buried at Kentigern RC cemetery in Glasgow.
