= Jimmy Bannister =

English footballer

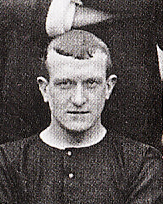

Personal information
- Full name: James Bannister
- Date of birth: 20 September 1880
- Place of birth: Leyland, Lancashire, England
- Date of death: 18 December 1953 (aged 73)
- Place of death: Farington, Leyland, England
- Height: 5 ft 7 in (1.70 m)
- Position: Inside right

Youth career
- Leyland Temperance
- Leyland
- Chorley

Senior career*
Years	Team	Apps	(Gls)
1902–1906	Manchester City	45	(21)
1906–1909	Manchester United	57	(7)
1909–1912	Preston North End	65	(12)
1912–?	Heywood	?	(?)
- * Club domestic league appearances and goals

James Bannister (20 September 1880 – 18 December 1953) was an English footballer. Bannister was acquired byManchester United at the 1906 auction of players, forced when Manchester City were found guilty of skimming money off gate receipts to illegally pay player bonuses. He helped the club win the 1908 league championship. He left United in 1909 to sign for Preston North End.
