= Association football during World War I =

Effects of the First World War on association football

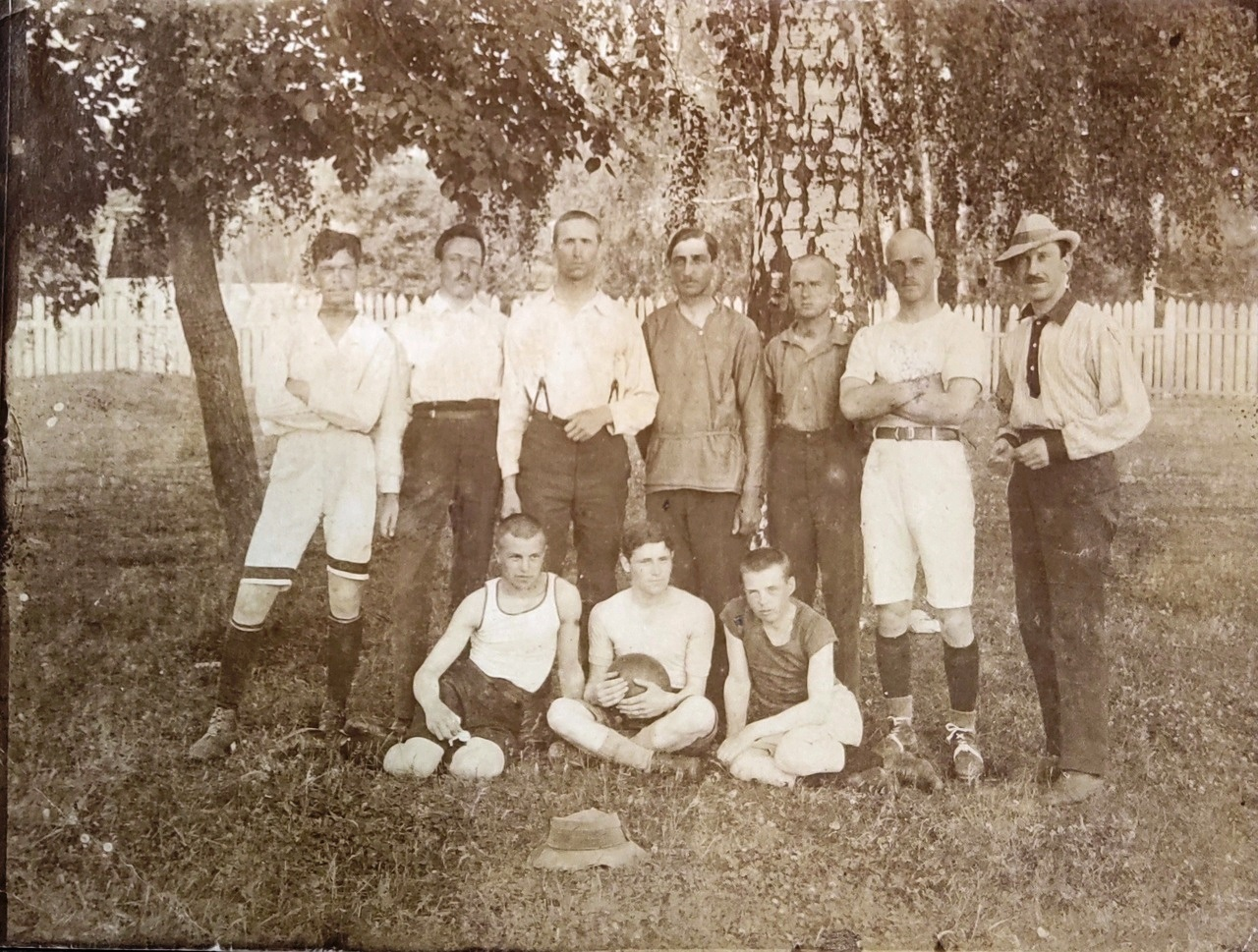
Football team of prisoners of war from Germany who worked on Kurbatovs furniture factory in Tsivilsk, Russian Empire

When World War I was declared in 1914, it had a negative effect on association football; in some countries competitions were suspended and players signed up to fight, resulting in the deaths of many players. Frederick Wall, Secretary of the Football Association, famously implied Jimmy Hogan was a traitor for spending the duration of World War I in Europe.

== Competition ==
=== United Kingdom ===
English club Harrogate Town were scheduled to play their first match as a club on 5 September 1914, but the match was cancelled due to the outbreak of the war.

Between 1915 and 1919 competitive football was suspended in England. Many players signed up to fight in the war, and as a result, many teams were depleted, and fielded guest players instead. The Football League and FA Cup were suspended and in their place regional league competitions were set up; appearances in these tournaments do not count in players' official records.

League football did continue in Scotland with the aim of maintaining morale, however the Scottish Cup was not held for five years.

=== Switzerland ===
Even though the Swiss Football League was not suspended, some 5,800 footballers – out of a total of 8,500 – signed up to fight. However, many of the pitches were destroyed – 420,000 square feet (39,000 m^{2}) out of a total of 920,000 square feet (85,000 m^{2}) had been turned into potato fields. After the outbreak of war in 1914, the Swiss national side did not compete again until 1920.

== Englishmen on the Continent ==
British players and trainers who were in contract with German professional clubs were among Allied civilians interned at Ruhleben in Berlin. Sports played a major role in the lives of the detainees. Among them were several former professional footballers, including three former England internationals, Fred Pentland, Samuel Wolstenholme and Steve Bloomer; a Scotland international, John Cameron; a German international, Edwin Dutton; John Brearley, once of Everton and Tottenham Hotspur and Fred Spiksley.

The Austro-Hungarian Empire was another enemy Central Power. Jimmy Hogan who had briefly coached Amateure SV between 1911 and 1912, returned to Vienna to coach the Austria national team in 1914.

== Christmas truce ==
The Christmas truce was a series of brief unofficial cessations of hostilities occurring on Christmas Eve or Christmas Day of 1914 between German and British or French troops in World War I, particularly that between British and German troops stationed along the Western Front. During the truce, a game of football was played between the British and German soldiers.

== Fighting footballers ==
=== The Football Battalion ===
On 6 September 1914, author Arthur Conan Doyle made a direct appeal for footballers to volunteer for service. Many players heeded the call, and a special Football Battalion was formed, as part of the Middlesex Regiment. The battalion was led by Frank Buckley, who later estimated that over 500 of the battalion's original 600 men had died. There were over 5,000 men playing professional football in Great Britain 1914, and of those, 2,000 joined the military services.

=== Edinburgh City Pals ===
The first of the footballers' battalions was raised in Edinburgh in November 1914 by Lieutenant Colonel Sir George McCrae. The 16th Royal Scots included players and supporters from Hearts, Hibernian, Falkirk and Raith Rovers, and recruitment of 1350 officers and men was completed in only six days.

=== Decorated footballers ===
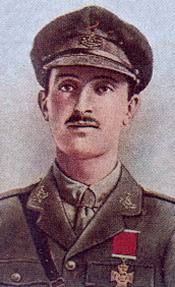
Donald Simpson Bell V.C.

A number of British footballers received medals for bravery during World War I, including Bernard Vann (MC and VC), Donald Simpson Bell (VC), William Angus (VC), Jimmy Speirs (MM), Tim Coleman (MM) and Davie Glen (MM). Others to receive decoration include Leigh Richmond Roose (MM) and Philip F. Fullard (MC and AFC). Other players who were not awarded medals have also been honoured, such as Walter Tull, who is honoured on both the Arras Memorial and at Northampton Town's Sixfields Stadium.

=== Players killed in action ===
Many football players, both amateur and professional, lost their lives. Larrett Roebuck was the first player from the English league to die, on 18 October 1914. Scottish side Heart of Midlothian lost seven players. Another Scottish side, Brechin City, lost six players. English team Bradford City, for example, lost nine players – first-team players Bob Torrance, Jimmy Speirs, Evelyn Lintott, James Conlin, James Comrie, Gerald Kirk, and reserve players George Draycott, Ernest Goodwin, and Harry Potter. William Baker, a member of the Plymouth Argyle team that won the Southern League in 1913, was killed in Serre during the Battle of the Somme. The website created by the Professional Footballers' Association, 'Football and the First World War' currently lists 296 players who were killed in the war.

== Memorials ==
On 7 November 2004, the McCrae's Battalion Great War Memorial was unveiled in the village of Contalmaison, France after first being proposed in April 1919. It commemorates the men of McCrae's Battalion who were killed during the First Battle of the Somme.

On 21 October 2010, the Footballers' Battalions Memorial was unveiled at Longueval, France, near Delville Wood, to commemorate those from the Footballers' Battalions who had fought and died in the Great War.

In October 2018, it was announced that in November 2018, to celebrate the 100th anniversary of the end of the war, a number of clubs would plant trees as part of a 'Football Remembers' campaign.

== See also ==
- Association football during World War II
- England national football team results (unofficial matches)
- Scotland national football team results (unofficial matches)
