= John Cameron (footballer, born 1872) =

Scottish footballer and manager

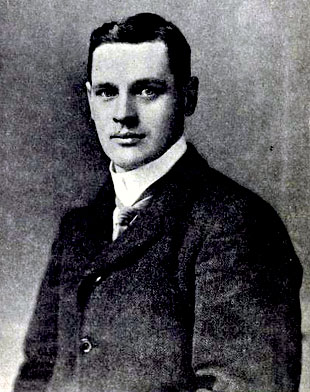
- Cameron c. 1908

Personal information
- Full name: John Cameron
- Date of birth: 13 April 1872
- Place of birth: Ayr, Scotland
- Date of death: 20 April 1935 (aged 63)
- Place of death: Glasgow, Scotland
- Position: Forward

Senior career*
Years	Team	Apps	(Gls)
–1895	Ayr Parkhouse		
1895	Queen's Park	0	(0)
1895–1898	Everton	42	(12)
1896	Queen's Park	0	(0)
1898–1907	Tottenham Hotspur	111	(43)

International career
1896	Scotland	1	(0)

Managerial career
- 1899–1907: Tottenham Hotspur
- 1907–1914: Dresdner SC
- 1918–1919: Ayr United
- * Club domestic league appearances and goals

John Cameron (13 April 1872 – 20 April 1935) was a Scottish footballer and manager. He played as a forward for Queen's Park, Everton and Scotland and was noted as an effective goal-maker and goalscorer. In 1899 he became player-manager at Tottenham Hotspur and guided them to victory in the 1901 FA Cup. As a result, they became the only club outside the English Football League to win the competition. In 1898 he became the first secretary of the Association Footballers' Union, which was the ill-fated fore-runner of the Professional Footballers' Association. He later coached Dresdner SC and during the First World War he was interned at Ruhleben, a civilian detention camp in Germany. After the war he coached Ayr United for one season and then became a football journalist, author and publisher. He had previously worked as a columnist for various newspapers before the war.

== Early career ==
Born in Ayr and educated at Ayr Grammar School, Cameron began his career with local club Ayr Parkhouse, before moving to Queen's Park in early 1895. He made 5 Glasgow Cup appearances and scored one goal for the Spiders (who were not members of the Scottish Football League at the time).

He worked in a shipping office in Liverpool and joined Everton in September 1895 as an amateur, and then turned fully professional. He switched from a centre-forward to an inside-forward while he was at Everton. He made his senior debut in a 5–0 home League win over Sheffield United in October 1895. Cameron produced some excellent displays for Everton and made 48 appearances and scored 14 goals. This record included 6 games and 2 goals in the FA Cup. Cameron had been one of the highest earning footballers of the day with Everton. He returned to Queen's Park for two short spells in the second half of the 1895–96 season, making four appearances, and also won a cap for Scotland: alongside Robert Smyth McColl, he played in a 3–3 draw with Ireland and helped Scotland win the 1896 British Home Championship.

In February 1898 while contracted to play for Everton, Cameron became involved in the movement toward unionisation of footballers in defiance of both League directives and club proposals which resulted in the power of players to seek high earnings. As the League were not willing to negotiate on this point Cameron broke contract with Everton and went to play for Tottenham Hotspur in the Southern Football League, directly because that League did not support the proposal to limit earnings.

== Tottenham Hotspur ==
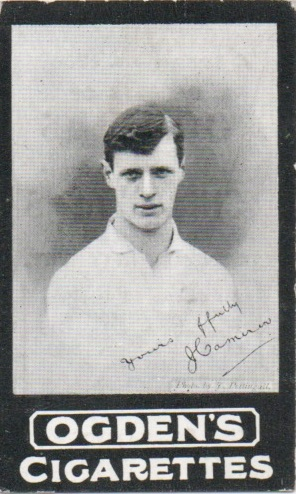
Ogden's Cigarette card of John Cameron after winning the 1900–01 FA Cup.

In May 1898 Cameron was signed by Frank Brettell as a player for Tottenham Hotspur. When Brettell was offered a better-paid position at Portsmouth and moved there in February 1899, Cameron succeeded Brettell and became player-manager for Tottenham. He enjoyed instant success when, in his first game in charge, Tottenham became the first lower division club ever to come from behind against top flight opposition to win an FA Cup tie, Cameron himself scoring the winning goal against Sunderland. In 1900 he led Tottenham to the Southern Football League title and a year later led them to victory in the 1901 FA Cup final: after drawing 2–2 with Sheffield United, Tottenham eventually won the replay with Cameron scoring an equaliser in a 3–1 win. As a result, Spurs became the only club outside the English League to win the competition. Under Cameron, the club also finished as a runners-up in the Southern League in 1902 and 1904. Cameron scored 139 goals in 293 appearances, including 43 goals in 111 appearances in the Southern League. He resigned as Tottenham manager in March 1907.

== Prisoner in Germany ==
After Tottenham Hotspur, Cameron worked briefly as a sport journalist, before going to Germany to coach Dresdner SC. While there the First World War broke out and he was subsequently interned at Ruhleben, a civilian detention camp in the Spandau district of Berlin. The camp contained between 4,000 and 5,500 prisoners. Gradually a mini-society evolved and football became a popular activity. Cup and league competitions were organised and as many as 1,000 attended the bigger games. Cameron was prominent in organising and playing football within the camp and was secretary of the Ruhleben Football Association. During his time at the camp he was also a member of the Ruhleben Tennis Association.

Cameron was one of several former professional footballers at Ruhleben. Others included former England internationals Fred Pentland, Samuel Wolstenholme and Steve Bloomer, a German international Edwin Dutton and one of his former Tottenham players, John Brearley. On 2 May 1915 an England XI featuring Pentland, Wolstenholme, Brearley and Bloomer played a World XI captained by Cameron.

== Career statistics ==
=== International ===
Appearances and goals by national team and year
National team	Year	Apps	Goals
Scotland	1896	1	0
Total		1	0

== Honours ==
=== Player ===
Scotland

- British Home Championship: 1895–96

=== Player/Manager ===
Tottenham Hotspur

- FA Cup: 1900–01
- Southern League: 1899–1900
- Western League: 1903–04
- Sheriff of London Charity Shield: 1902

== Sources ==
- Who's Who of Everton (2004): Tony Matthews
- Brown, Paul (2020). The Ruhleben Football Association: How Steve Bloomer's Footballers Survived a First World War Prison Camp. Goal Post. ISBN 9780995541238.
