= Charles Drummond Ellis =

English physicist and scientific administrator

Charles Drummond Ellis FRS
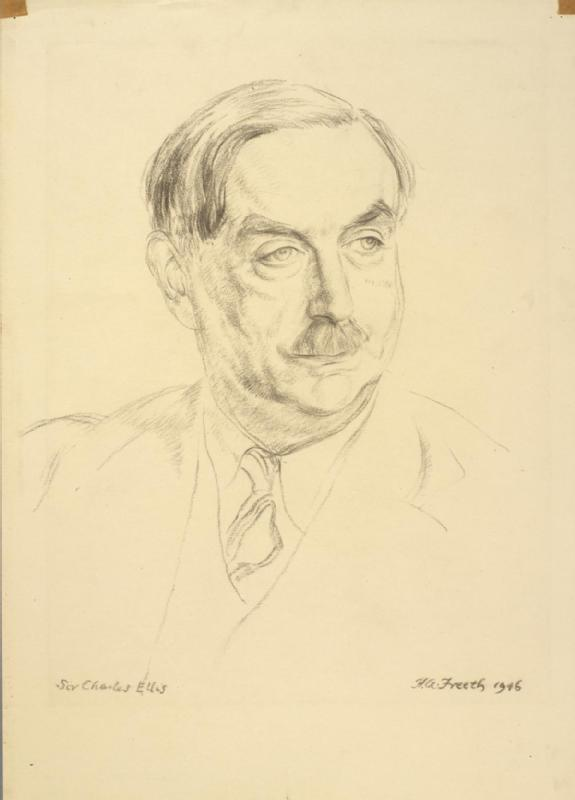
- Sir Charles Drummond Ellis, FRS by Andrew Freeth
- Born: 11 August 1895; Hampstead, London, United Kingdom
- Died: 10 January 1980 (aged 84); Cookham, United Kingdom
- Education: Trinity College, Cambridge
- Known for: Co-discoverer of the neutrino
- Board member of: MAUD (1936); Finance Corporation for Industry, director; National Coal Board, advisor; British Coal Utilization Research Association, President (1946-1955); British American Tobacco Company, advisor
- Spouse: Paula Warzcewska (m. 1925; died 1966)
- Parents: Abraham Charles Ellis (father); Isabelle Flockart Carswell (mother)
- Scientific career
- Fields: Physics
- Workplaces: Trinity College, Cambridge (1921-1935); King's College London (1935-1945)
- Academic advisors: Ernest Rutherford

Sir Charles Drummond Ellis FRS (11 August 1895 in Hampstead – 10 January 1980 in Cookham) was an English physicist and scientific administrator. His work on the magnetic spectrum of the beta-rays helped to develop a better understanding of nuclear structure.

== Education and internment ==
Ellis was the son of Abraham Charles Ellis, a general manager of the Metropolitan Railway, and Isabelle Flockart Carswell. He won a scholarship to Harrow School where he excelled academically as well as at sport. In 1913, he became a cadet in the Royal Military Academy in preparation for a career in the Royal Engineers.

He was holidaying in Germany the following summer when World War I broke out. All British nationals were rounded up and sent to the Ruhleben internment camp just outside Berlin. The camp had been a horse racecourse. During internment the detainees had a large degree of freedom. They had access to books, and Ellis made good use of his time to study. Another detainee in the camp was James Chadwick who was later to receive the Nobel Prize for his work on the discovery of the neutron. Chadwick inspired Ellis and together they erected a laboratory in one of the horse stables where they undertook scientific experiments on the photochemical process.

== Career after the war ==
After the war Ellis decided to abandon a military career. He entered Trinity College, Cambridge where he studied natural sciences. After graduating in 1920 he became engaged in research work at the Cavendish Laboratory, Cambridge, where the director, Sir Ernest Rutherford, had now engaged Chadwick. While Rutherford and Chadwick worked on alpha radioactivity and alpha particles for nuclear disintegration experiments Ellis studied beta and gamma radiation. He became a leading authority on the subject, publishing many articles in scientific journals.

In 1921, Ellis had become a fellow of Trinity College and was appointed assistant lecturer in natural science. In 1925, he married Paula Warzcewska, the daughter of a wealthy Polish shipbuilder. Although there were no children Paula (known as Polly in England) had a daughter from a previous marriage. In 1929, he was elected a fellow of the Royal Society.

In 1930, Rutherford, Chadwick and Ellis published together a classic monograph Radiations from Radioactive Substances.

== Discovery of the neutrino ==
During the early 1930s Ellis worked with Nevill Mott on energy relations in beta decay. Mott said later that Ellis had “practically discovered the neutrino”. He worked with W.J. Henderson on the energy distribution of positrons in artificial radioactivity. In 1936 Ellis was elected a fellow of the American Physical Society.

In 1936, a year after Chadwick's appointment to a professorship at Liverpool, Ellis was appointed to the Wheatstone chair of physics at King's College London in succession to Edward Victor Appleton who had become professor of natural sciences at Cambridge. Ellis continued his research alongside his new teaching and administration commitments.

In 1940, Ellis became a member of MAUD who were investigating the possibility of using nuclear fission to develop new weapons. He became scientific adviser to the army council from 1943 to 1946, serving on several high-level committees. He was knighted in 1946 for his war service.

== Later career ==
After World War II, Ellis held several posts which were not related to nuclear weapons. He was director of the Finance Corporation for Industry, in charge of research and development for the National Coal Board. He was president of the British Coal Utilization Research Association from 1946 to 1955 and a member of the advisory council to the minister of fuel and power from 1947 to 1955. He became scientific adviser to the British American Tobacco Company (BAT) at a time when the association between smoking and various diseases was just starting to be suspected. He retired from the Gas Council in 1966 and from BAT in 1972.

During his final decade, his health was poor. In 1980, he died in a nursing home in Cookham after a short illness.

== Ellis–Wooster experiment ==
In 1927, Ellis and William Alfred Wooster (1903–1984) performed an important experiment with β-rays. Their experiment led to Pauli's suggestion of the neutrino.

In beta decay, an atom emitted electrons with a continuous range of energies up to a certain maximum value. This phenomenon had been known since 1914, but it was not until 1927 that Charles Drummond Ellis, a British experimental physicist, and his colleague William Alfred Wooster were able to establish conclusively that the energies were distributed continuously at the electrons' emission from the nucleus. Before this result, Ellis had engaged in a long dispute with Lise Meitner in Germany, who held that that the electrons were slowed down unevenly only after being emitted.
