= Steve Bloomer's Watchin' =

"Steve Bloomer's Watchin'" is a song which has been the official club anthem of Derby County Football Club since Boxing Day 1997, where the finished version of the song was played for the first time before the league game against Newcastle United. Derby won the game 1-0. The original version of the song was first played before the Manchester United home game in October of that same season.

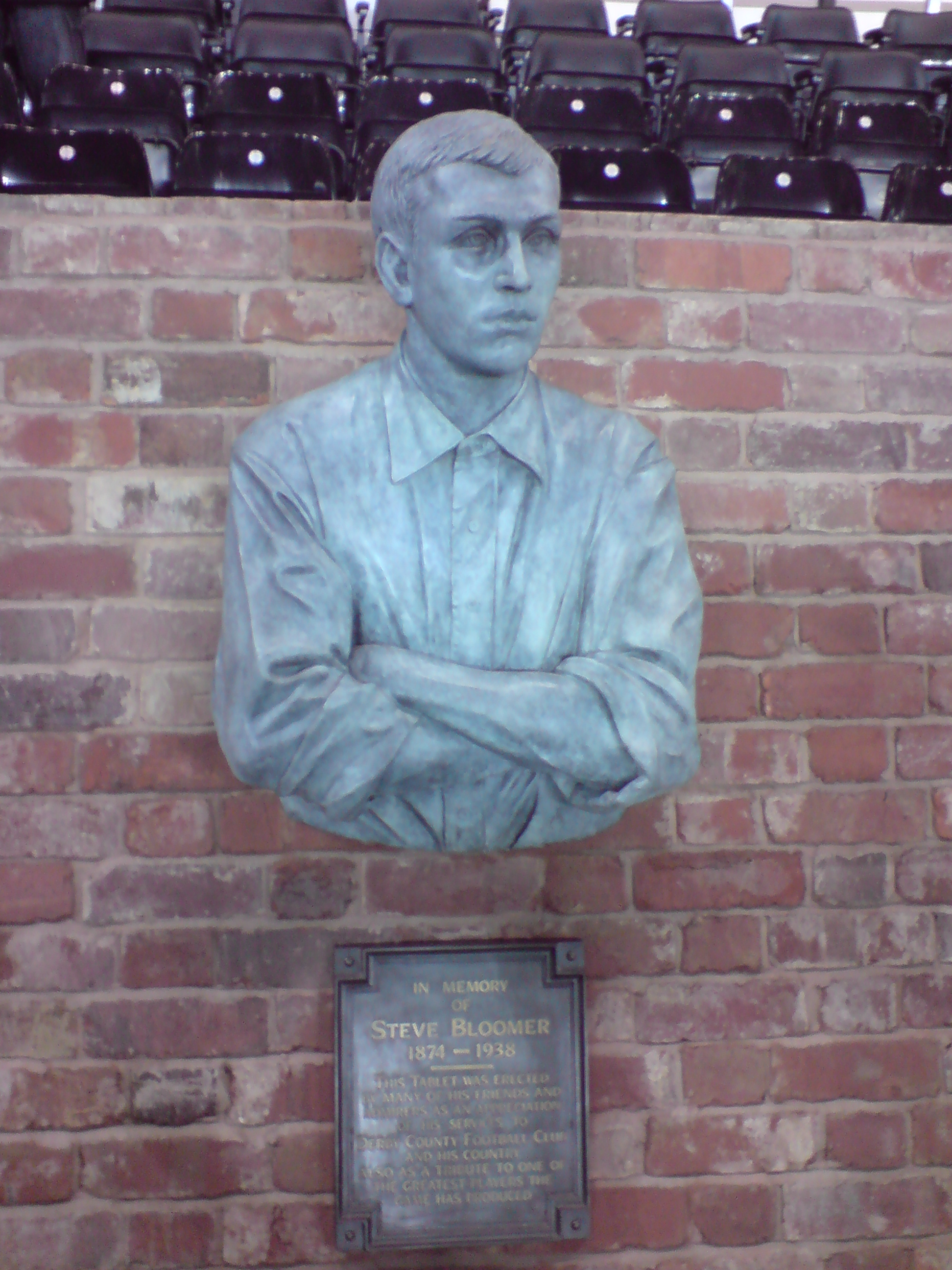
The bust of Steve Bloomer watching the matches at Pride Park Stadium

The idea for the song began in November 1996 when two Derby County supporters Mark Tewson and Martyn Miller heard an old Australian rules football song entitled "Up There Cazaly" when Gary Sadler recommended it which was composed by Mike Brady, in 1979, for the Seven Network's telecasts of the VFL. Within days of first hearing the Australian song, the two Derby fans had rewritten the lyrics of the song. A friend and musician Stephen Halsten-Reid re-vamped the musical composition.

The local BBC radio station, Radio Derby aired the song on the Pam Steele Show. The Derby County Head of Media Jim Fearn told Miller and Tewson that he thought they had something here that could work, however, a more professional version of the composition would be needed if this was going to be an anthem of the future. The actor Robert Lindsay (a Derby County fan) agreed to assist. Others involved in the new recording were Lionel Pickering and Jim Smith (who were Derby's owner and manager respectively) and many of the squad's players at the time, including team captain, Robin van der Laan, Ron Willems, and Rob Kozluk. The eventual recording was performed under the name "Robert Lindsay and the Pride Park Posse".

A near capacity crowd greeted the home team as they walked out onto the field on Boxing Day 1997 to play Newcastle United. They were also greeted by the thundering noise of "Steve Bloomer's Watchin'" over the loud-speaker system. From then until the end of the season, the song was played before the home games and also at full-time, unless Derby lost. In the years since its first pre-game playing, the song has grown in popularity among the Derby fans. It is still played at home games and can now be often heard being sung at away games by the fans themselves.

In 2007, "Steve Bloomer's Watchin'" celebrated its 10th anniversary as the club's official song. The song has helped bring Steve Bloomer back into the consciousness of modern Derby fans. The player had unparalleled scoring achievements, for both Derby and England (28 goals in 23 games). He was considered the game's first true superstar and there is a bronze statue of him next to the home dug-out at Pride Park Stadium.
