= John Balfour (diplomat) =

British diplomat

Balfour in 1948.

Sir John Balfour GCMG, GBE (1894–1983) was a British diplomat.

== Family ==
Sir John was the son of the Conservative politician Charles Balfour, and the maternal grandson of the 5th Earl of Antrim. In 1933, he married Frances van Millingen, daughter of Professor Alexander van Millingen of Robert College, Constantinople, although their marriage remained childless.

== World War 1 ==
Balfour was an Oxford student studying German in the city of Freiberg when World War I began. He spent the entire war in Ruhleben internment camp.

== Diplomatic career ==
During his service with the Foreign Office, Balfour was posted to Portugal, Spain (1951–1954), Argentina, Moscow, and Washington DC. A hispanophile, Balfour was an ardent opponent of Francisco Franco's regime.

In 1983, Balfour published his memoirs, Not Too Correct an Aureole: Recollections of a Diplomat.
