= Francis Gribble =

British author

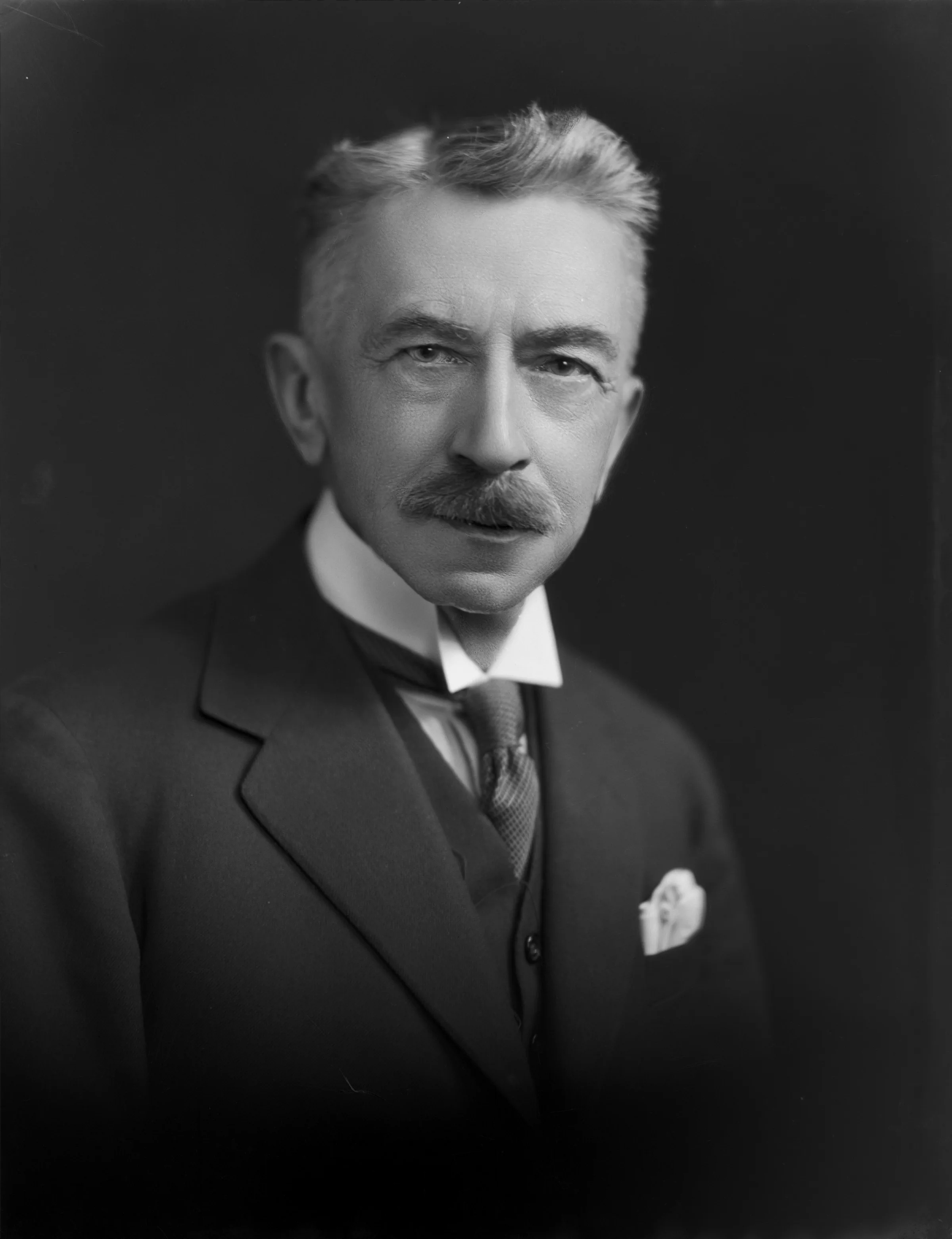
- Gribble in 1929
- Born: Francis Henry Gribble; 1862
- Died: 1946 (aged 83–84)
- Education: Chatham House; Exeter College, Oxford
- Occupations: Author; journalist
- Notable work: The Pillar of Cloud (1906)

Francis Henry Gribble (1862 – 1946) was a British writer born in Devon. During World War I, he worked in the Ministry of Information. He published a memoir called Seen in Passing (1926).

He was the son of a banker and received his education at Chatham House, Ramsgate, and Exeter College, Oxford. He finished Oxford in 1884 with a degree in classics. Gribble became a teacher of Classics, but moved to London to become a journalist in 1887. He also began to publish fiction books in the 1890s. His novel The Red Spell (1895) was about the Paris Commune. His most significant novel is The Pillar of Cloud (1906) about a boarding-house for women who plot to escape the service life. It is not considered a feminist novel but it does emphasize a female community and the idea that women should not depend too much upon men.

He also wrote travel books and biographies, among these, The Love Affairs of Lord Byron (1910), The Life of Emperor Francis Joseph (1914) and The Romantic Life of Shelley (1911).

He was held at the Ruhleben internment camp during World War I. When he returned to London he reported that Germany was in danger of famine.
