= James Chadwick =

British physicist (1891–1974)

Sir James Chadwick CH FRS
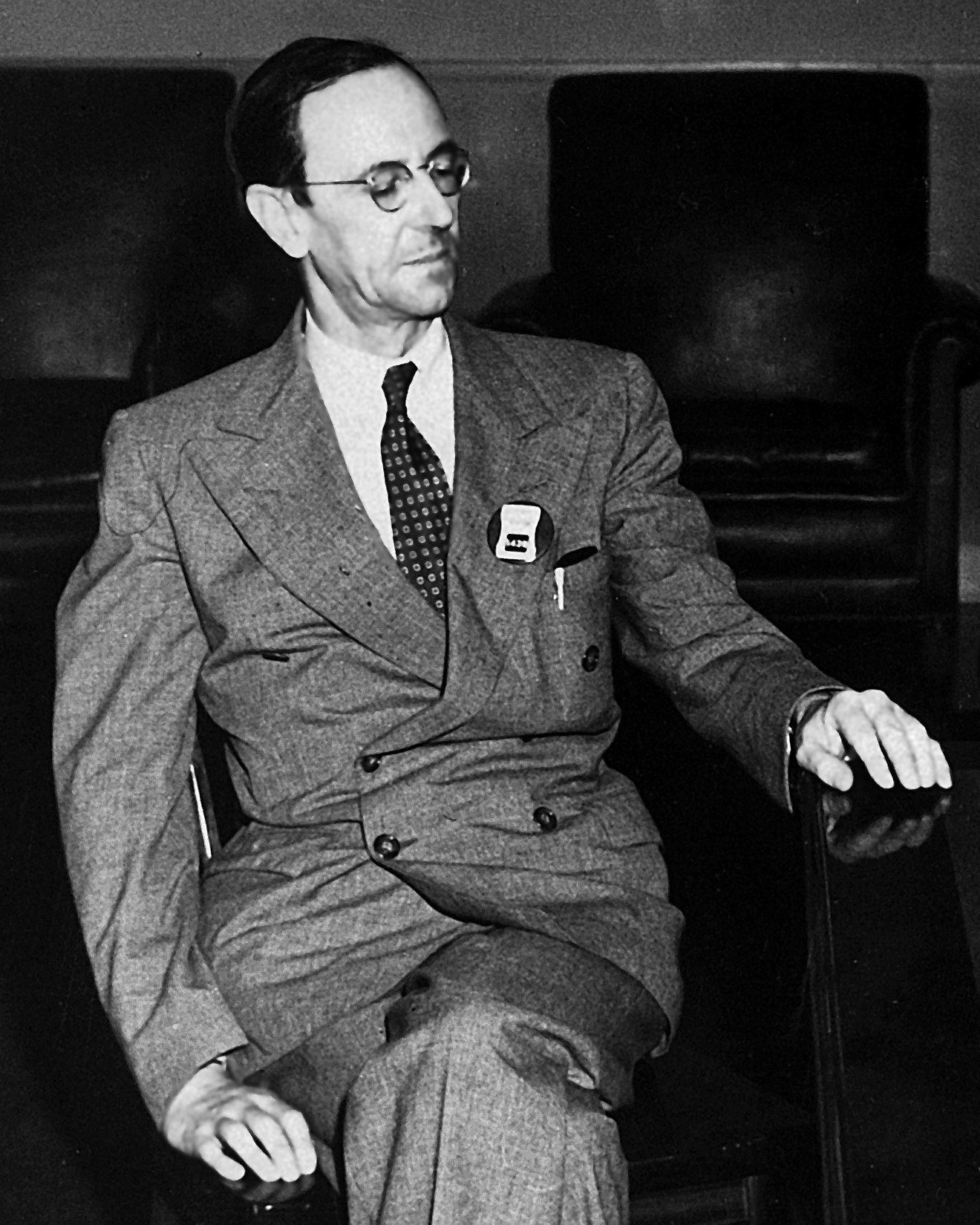
- Chadwick, c. 1945

36th Master of Gonville and Caius College, Cambridge
- In office 1948–1959
- Preceded by: J. F. Cameron
- Succeeded by: Sir Nevill Mott

Personal details
- Born: 20 October 1891 Cheshire, England
- Died: 24 July 1974 (aged 82) Cambridge, England
- Spouse: Aileen Stewart-Brown (m. 1925)
- Children: 2
- Education: Victoria University of Manchester (BSc, MSc); University of Cambridge (PhD)
- Known for: Discovery of the neutron
- Awards: Hughes Medal (1932); Nobel Prize in Physics (1935); Copley Medal (1950); Faraday Medal (1950); Franklin Medal (1951)
- Scientific career
- Fields: Physics
- Workplaces: University of Cambridge; University of Liverpool
- Doctoral advisor: Ernest Rutherford
- Doctoral students: Étienne Biéler; Albert Crewe; Maurice Goldhaber; John Riley Holt; Ernest C. Pollard
- Other notable students: Charles Drummond Ellis; Norman Feather; Joseph Rotblat

Sir James Chadwick (20 October 1891 – 24 July 1974) was a British experimental physicist who received the Nobel Prize in Physics in 1935 for his discovery of the neutron. In 1941, he wrote the final draft of the MAUD Report, which inspired the U.S. government to begin serious atomic bomb research efforts. He was the head of the British team that worked on the Manhattan Project during World War II. He was knighted in Britain in 1945 for his achievements in nuclear physics.

Chadwick graduated from the Victoria University of Manchester in 1911, where he studied under Ernest Rutherford (known as the "father of nuclear physics"). At Manchester, he continued to study under Rutherford until he was awarded his MSc in 1913. The same year, Chadwick was awarded an 1851 Research Fellowship from the Royal Commission for the Exhibition of 1851. He elected to study beta radiation under Hans Geiger in Berlin. Using Geiger's recently developed Geiger counter, Chadwick was able to demonstrate that beta radiation produced a continuous spectrum, and not discrete lines as had been thought. Still in Germany when World War I broke out in Europe, he spent the next four years in the Ruhleben internment camp.

After the war, Chadwick followed Rutherford to the Cavendish Laboratory at the University of Cambridge, where Chadwick earned his Doctor of Philosophy degree under Rutherford's supervision from Gonville and Caius College, Cambridge, in June 1921. He was Rutherford's assistant director of research in the Cavendish Laboratory for over a decade at a time when it was one of the world's foremost centres for the study of physics, attracting students like John Cockcroft, Norman Feather, and Mark Oliphant. Chadwick followed his discovery of the neutron by measuring its mass. He anticipated that neutrons would become a major weapon in the fight against cancer. Chadwick left the Cavendish Laboratory in 1935 to become a professor of physics at the University of Liverpool, where he overhauled an antiquated laboratory and, by installing a cyclotron, made it an important centre for the study of nuclear physics.

== Early life and education ==
James Chadwick was born on 20 October 1891 in Cheshire, England, the son of Anne Mary (née Knowles) and John Joseph Chadwick. He was named after his paternal grandfather. In 1895, his parents moved to Manchester, leaving him in the care of his maternal grandparents. He went to Bollington Cross Primary School, and was offered a scholarship to Manchester Grammar School, which his family had to turn down as they could not afford the small fees that still had to be paid. Instead he attended the Central Grammar School for Boys in Manchester, rejoining his parents there. He now had two younger brothers, Harry and Hubert; a sister had died in infancy. At the age of 16, he sat two examinations for university scholarships, and won both of them.

Chadwick chose to attend Victoria University of Manchester, which he entered in 1908. He meant to study mathematics, but enrolled in physics by mistake. Like most students, he lived at home, walking the 4 miles (6.4 km) to the university and back each day. At the end of his first year, he was awarded a Heginbottom Scholarship to study physics. The physics department was headed by Ernest Rutherford, who assigned research projects to final-year students, and he instructed Chadwick to devise a means of comparing the amount of radioactive energy of two different sources. The idea was that they could be measured in terms of the activity of 1 gram (0.035 oz) of radium, a unit of measurement which would become known as the curie. Rutherford's suggested approach was unworkable—something Chadwick knew but was afraid to tell Rutherford—so Chadwick pressed on, and eventually devised the required method. The results became Chadwick's first paper, which, co-authored with Rutherford, was published in 1912. He graduated with first-class honours in 1911.

Having devised a means of measuring gamma radiation, Chadwick proceeded to measure the absorption of gamma rays by various gases and liquids. This time the resulting paper was published under his name alone. He was awarded a Master of Science in 1913, and was appointed a Beyer Fellow. The same year, he was awarded an 1851 Exhibition Scholarship, which allowed him to study and research at a university in continental Europe. He chose to go to the Physikalisch-Technische Reichsanstalt in Germany to study beta radiation under Hans Geiger. Using Geiger's recently developed Geiger counter, which provided more accuracy than the earlier photographic techniques, he was able to demonstrate that beta radiation did not produce discrete lines, as has been previously thought, but rather a continuous spectrum with peaks in certain regions. On a visit to Geiger's laboratory, Albert Einstein told Chadwick that: "I can explain either of these things, but I can't explain them both at the same time." The continuous spectrum would remain an unexplained phenomenon for many years.

Chadwick was still in Germany at the start of the First World War, and was interned in the Ruhleben internment camp near Berlin, where he was allowed to set up a laboratory in the stables and conduct scientific experiments using improvised materials such as radioactive toothpaste. With the help of Charles Drummond Ellis, he worked on the ionisation of phosphorus, and the photochemical reaction of carbon monoxide and chlorine. He was released after the Armistice with Germany came into effect in November 1918, and returned to his parents' home in Manchester, where he wrote up his findings over the previous four years for the 1851 Exhibition commissioners.

Rutherford gave Chadwick a part-time teaching position at Manchester, allowing him to continue research. He looked at the nuclear charge of platinum, silver, and copper, and experimentally found that this was the same as the atomic number within an error of less than 1.5 per cent. In April 1919, Rutherford became director of the Cavendish Laboratory at the University of Cambridge, and Chadwick joined him there a few months later. Chadwick was awarded a Clerk Maxwell Studentship in 1920, and enrolled as a PhD student at Gonville and Caius College, Cambridge. The first half of his thesis was his work with atomic numbers; in the second, he looked at the forces inside the nucleus. He was awarded his degree in June 1921, and became a Fellow of Gonville and Caius College in November.

== Career and research ==
=== Cambridge ===
Chadwick's Clerk Maxwell Studentship expired in 1923, and he was succeeded by the Russian physicist Pyotr Kapitza. The Chairman of the Advisory Council of the Department of Scientific and Industrial Research, Sir William McCormick, arranged for Chadwick to become Rutherford's assistant director of research. In this role, he helped Rutherford select PhD students. Over the next few years these would include John Cockcroft, Norman Feather, and Mark Oliphant, who would become firm friends with Chadwick. As many students had no idea what they wanted to research, Rutherford and Chadwick would suggest topics. He edited all the papers produced by the laboratory.

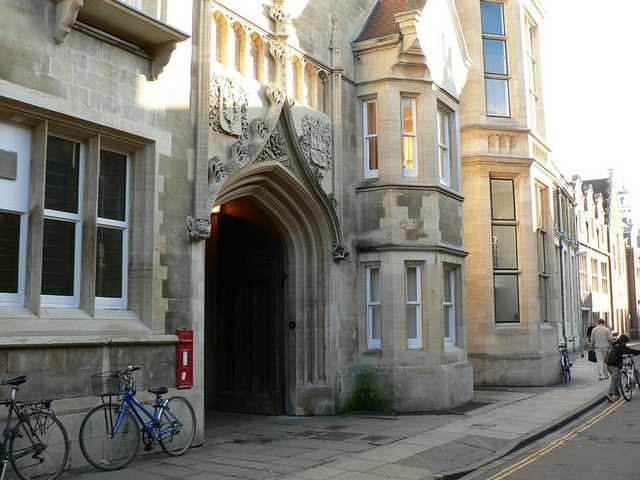
The original building of the Cavendish Laboratory was the home of some of the great discoveries in physics. It was founded in 1874 by the Duke of Devonshire (whose family name was Cavendish), and its first professor was James Clerk Maxwell. The Laboratory has since moved to West Cambridge.

In 1925, Chadwick met Aileen Stewart-Brown, the daughter of a Liverpool stockbroker. The two were married in August 1925, with Kapitza as best man. The couple had twin daughters, Joanna and Judith, who were born in February 1927.

In his research, Chadwick continued to probe the nucleus. In 1925, the concept of spin had allowed physicists to explain the Zeeman effect, but it also created unexplained anomalies. At the time it was believed that the nucleus consisted of protons and electrons, so nitrogen's nucleus, for example, with a mass number of 14, was assumed to contain 14 protons and 7 electrons. This gave it the right mass and charge, but the wrong spin.

At a conference at Cambridge on beta particles and gamma rays in 1928, Chadwick met Geiger again. Geiger had brought with him a new model of his Geiger counter, which had been improved by his student, Walther Müller. Chadwick had not used one since the war, and the new Geiger–Müller counter was potentially a major improvement over the scintillation techniques then in use at Cambridge, which relied on the human eye for observation. The major drawback with it was that it detected alpha, beta and gamma radiation, and radium, which the Cavendish Laboratory normally used in its experiments, emitted all three, and was therefore unsuitable for what Chadwick had in mind. However, polonium is an alpha emitter, and Lise Meitner sent Chadwick about 2 millicuries (about 0.5 μg) from Germany.

=== Liverpool ===
With the onset of the Great Depression in the United Kingdom, the government became more parsimonious with funding for science. At the same time, Lawrence's recent invention, the cyclotron, promised to revolutionise experimental nuclear physics, and Chadwick felt that the Cavendish Laboratory would fall behind unless it also acquired one. He therefore chafed under Rutherford, who clung to the belief that good nuclear physics could still be done without large, expensive equipment, and turned down the request for a cyclotron.

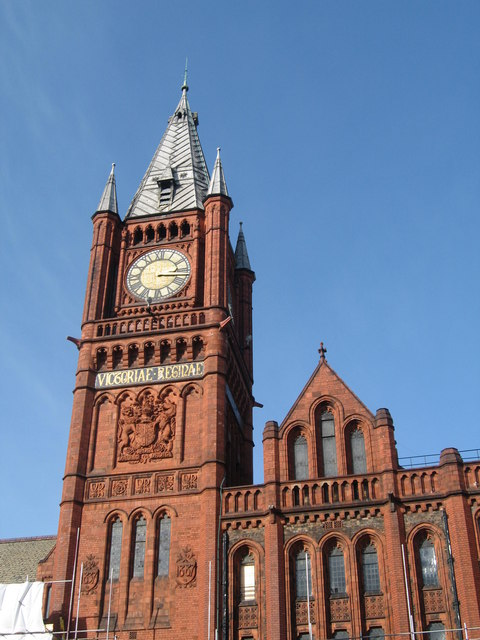
"Red brick" Victoria Building at the University of Liverpool.

Chadwick was a critic of Big Science in general, and Lawrence in particular, whose approach he considered careless and focused on technology at the expense of science. When Lawrence proposed the existence of a new and hitherto unknown particle that he claimed was a possible source of limitless energy at the Solvay Conference in 1933, Chadwick responded that the results were more likely attributable to contamination of the equipment. While Lawrence rechecked his results at Berkeley only to find that Chadwick was correct, Rutherford and Oliphant conducted an investigation at the Cavendish that found that deuterium fuses to form helium-3, thereby causing the effect that Lawrence had observed. This was another major discovery, but the Oliphant–Rutherford particle accelerator was an expensive state-of-the-art piece of equipment.

In March 1935, Chadwick received an offer of the Lyon Jones Chair of Physics at the University of Liverpool, in his wife's home town, to succeed Lionel Wilberforce. The laboratory was so antiquated that it still ran on direct current electricity, but Chadwick seized the opportunity, assuming the chair on 1 October 1935. The university's prestige was soon bolstered by Chadwick's Nobel Prize, which was announced in November 1935. His medal was sold at auction in 2014 for $329,000.

Chadwick set about acquiring a cyclotron for Liverpool. He started by spending £700 to refurbish the antiquated laboratories at Liverpool, so some components could be made in-house. He was able to persuade the university to provide £2,000 and obtained a grant for another £2,000 from the Royal Society. To build his cyclotron, Chadwick brought in two young experts, Bernard Kinsey and Harold Walke, who had worked with Lawrence at the University of California. A local cable manufacturer donated the copper conductor for the coils. The cyclotron's 50-ton magnet was manufactured in Trafford Park by Metropolitan-Vickers, which also made the vacuum chamber. The cyclotron was completely installed and running in July 1939. The total cost of £5,184 was more than Chadwick had received from the university and the Royal Society, so Chadwick paid the rest from his 159,917 kr (£8,243) Nobel Prize money.

At Liverpool, the Medicine and Science faculties worked together closely. Chadwick was automatically a committee member of both faculties, and in 1938 he was appointed to a commission headed by Lord Derby to investigate the arrangements for cancer treatment in Liverpool. Chadwick anticipated that neutrons and radioactive isotopes produced with the 37-inch cyclotron could be used to study biochemical processes, and might become a weapon in the fight against cancer.

== Discovery of the neutron ==
In Germany, Walther Bothe and his student, Herbert Becker, had used polonium to bombard beryllium with alpha particles, producing an unusual form of radiation. Chadwick had his Australian 1851 Exhibition scholar, Hugh Webster, duplicate their results. To Chadwick, this was evidence of something that he and Rutherford had been hypothesising for years: the neutron, a theoretical nuclear particle with no electric charge. Then in January 1932, Feather drew Chadwick's attention to another surprising result. Frédéric and Irène Joliot-Curie had succeeded in knocking protons from paraffin wax using polonium and beryllium as a source for what they thought was gamma radiation. Rutherford and Chadwick disagreed; protons were too heavy for that. But neutrons would need only a small amount of energy to achieve the same effect. In Rome, Ettore Majorana came to the same conclusion: the Joliot-Curies had discovered the neutron but did not know it.

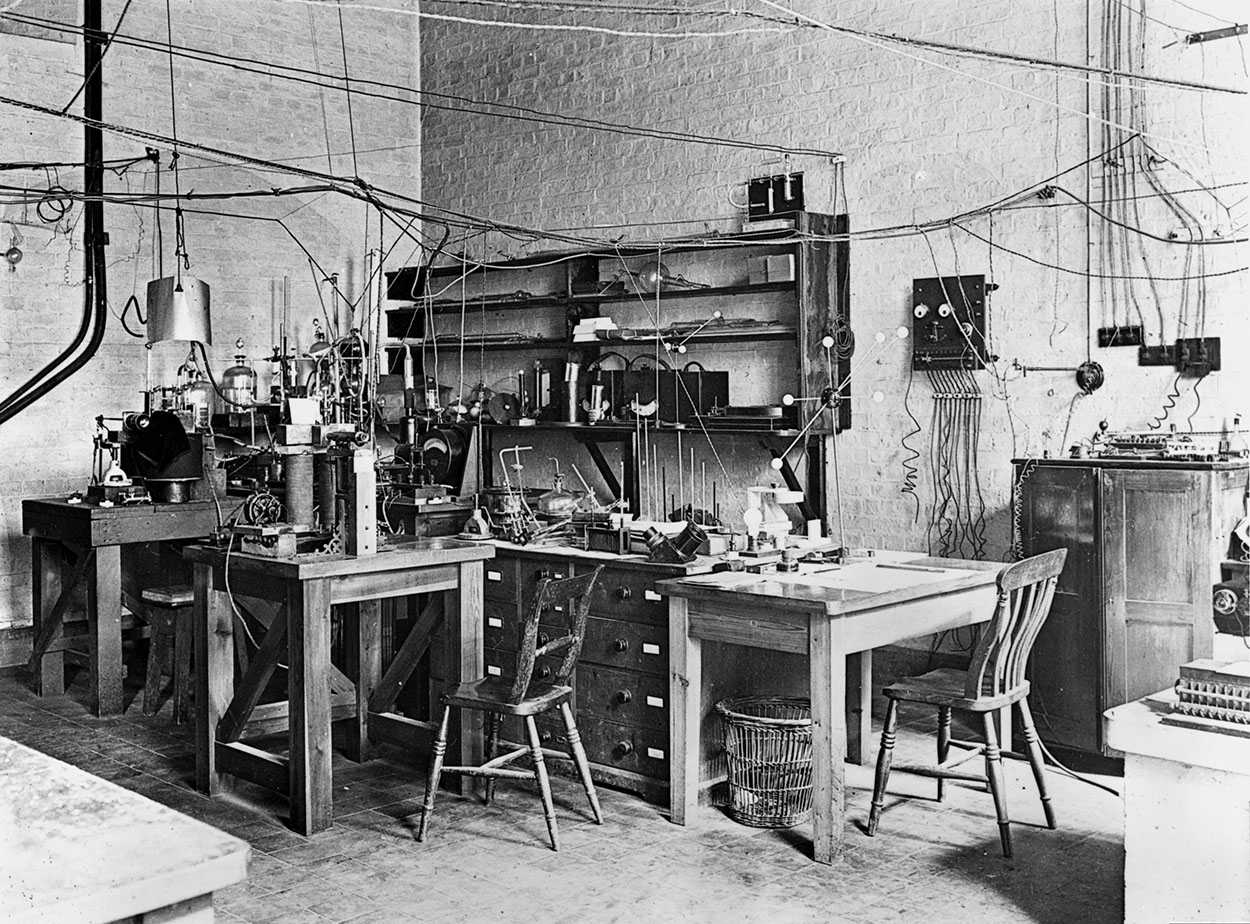
Sir Ernest Rutherford's laboratory

Chadwick dropped all his other responsibilities to concentrate on proving the existence of the neutron, assisted by Feather and frequently working late at night. He devised a simple apparatus that consisted of a cylinder containing a polonium source and beryllium target. The resulting radiation could then be directed at a material such as paraffin wax. The displaced particles, which were protons, would go into a small ionisation chamber where they could be detected with an oscilloscope. In February 1932, after only about two weeks of experimentation with neutrons, Chadwick sent a letter to Nature titled "Possible Existence of a Neutron". He communicated his findings in detail in an article sent to Proceedings of the Royal Society A titled "The Existence of a Neutron" in May. His discovery of the neutron was a milestone in understanding the nucleus. Reading Chadwick's paper, Robert Bacher and Edward Condon realised that anomalies in the then-current theory, like the spin of nitrogen, would be resolved if the neutron has a spin of 1/2 and that a nitrogen nucleus consisted of seven protons and seven neutrons.

The theoretical physicists Niels Bohr and Werner Heisenberg considered whether the neutron could be a fundamental nuclear particle like the proton and electron, rather than a proton–electron pair. Heisenberg showed that the neutron was best described as a new nuclear particle, but its exact nature remained unclear. In his 1933 Bakerian Lecture, Chadwick estimated that a neutron had a mass of about 1.0067 Da. Since a proton and an electron had a combined mass of 1.0078 u, this implied the neutron as a proton–electron composite had a binding energy of about 2 MeV, which sounded reasonable, although it was hard to understand how a particle with so little binding energy could be stable. Estimating such a small mass difference required challenging precise measurements, however, and several conflicting results were obtained in 1933–4. By bombarding boron with alpha particles, Frédéric and Irène Joliot-Curie obtained a large value for the mass of a neutron, but Ernest Lawrence's team at the University of California produced a small one. Then Maurice Goldhaber, a refugee from Nazi Germany and a graduate student at the Cavendish Laboratory, suggested to Chadwick that deuterons could be photodisintegrated by the 2.6 MeV gamma rays of ^{208}Tl (then known as thorium C"):

| ^{2}_{1}D | + | γ | → | ^{1}_{1}H | + | n |

An accurate value for the mass of the neutron could be determined from this process. Chadwick and Goldhaber tried this and found that it worked. They measured the kinetic energy of the proton produced as 1.05 MeV, leaving the mass of the neutron as the unknown in the equation. Chadwick and Goldhaber calculated that it was either 1.0084 or 1.0090 atomic units, depending on the values used for the masses of the proton and deuteron. (The modern accepted value for the mass of the neutron is 1.00866 Da.) The mass of the neutron was too large to be a proton–electron pair.

For his discovery of the neutron, Chadwick was awarded the Hughes Medal in 1932, the Nobel Prize in Physics in 1935, the Copley Medal in 1950, and the Franklin Medal in 1951. His discovery of the neutron made it possible to produce elements heavier than uranium in the laboratory by the capture of slow neutrons followed by beta decay. Unlike the positively charged alpha particles, which are repelled by the electrical forces present in the nuclei of other atoms, neutrons do not need to overcome any Coulomb barrier, and can therefore penetrate and enter the nuclei of even the heaviest elements such as uranium. This inspired Enrico Fermi to investigate the nuclear reactions brought about by collisions of nuclei with slow neutrons, work for which Fermi would receive the Nobel Prize in 1938.

Wolfgang Pauli proposed another kind of particle on 4 December 1930 to explain the continuous spectrum of beta radiation that Chadwick had reported in 1914. Since not all of the energy of beta radiation could be accounted for, the law of conservation of energy appeared to be violated, but Pauli argued that this could be redressed if another, undiscovered, particle was involved. Pauli also called this particle a neutron, but it was clearly not the same particle as Chadwick's neutron. Fermi renamed it the neutrino (Italian for "little neutron"). In 1934, Fermi proposed his theory of beta decay which explained that the electrons emitted from the nucleus were created by the decay of a neutron into a proton, an electron, and a neutrino. The neutrino could account for the missing energy, but a particle with little mass and no electric charge was difficult to observe. Rudolf Peierls and Hans Bethe calculated that neutrinos could easily pass through the Earth, so the chances of detecting them were slim. Frederick Reines and Clyde Cowan would confirm the neutrino on 14 June 1956 by placing a detector within a large antineutrino flux from a nearby nuclear reactor.

== Second World War ==
=== Tube Alloys and the MAUD Report ===
During the Second World War, Chadwick carried out research as part of the Tube Alloys project to build an atom bomb, while his Manchester lab and environs were harassed by Luftwaffe bombing. When the Quebec Agreement merged his project with the American Manhattan Project, he became part of the British Mission, and worked at the Los Alamos Laboratory and in Washington, D.C. He surprised everyone by earning the almost-complete trust of project director Leslie R. Groves, Jr. For his efforts, Chadwick received a knighthood in the New Year Honours on 1 January 1945. In July 1945, he viewed the Trinity nuclear test. After this, he served as the British scientific advisor to the United Nations Atomic Energy Commission. Uncomfortable with the trend toward Big Science, he returned to Cambridge where he became Master of Gonville and Caius College in 1948.

In Germany, Otto Hahn and Fritz Strassmann bombarded uranium with neutrons, and noted that barium, a lighter element, was among the products produced. Hitherto, only the same or heavier elements had been produced by the process. In January 1939, Meitner and her nephew Otto Frisch astounded the physics community with a paper that explained this result. They theorised that uranium atoms bombarded with neutrons can break into two roughly equal fragments, a process they called fission. They calculated that this would result in the release of about 200 MeV, implying an energy release orders of magnitude greater than chemical reactions, and Frisch confirmed their theory experimentally. It was soon noted by Hahn that if neutrons were released during fission, then a chain reaction was possible. French scientists Pierre Joliot, Hans von Halban, and Lew Kowarski soon verified that more than one neutron was indeed emitted per fission. In a paper co-authored with the American physicist John Wheeler, Bohr theorised that fission was more likely to occur in the uranium-235 isotope, which made up only 0.7 per cent of natural uranium.

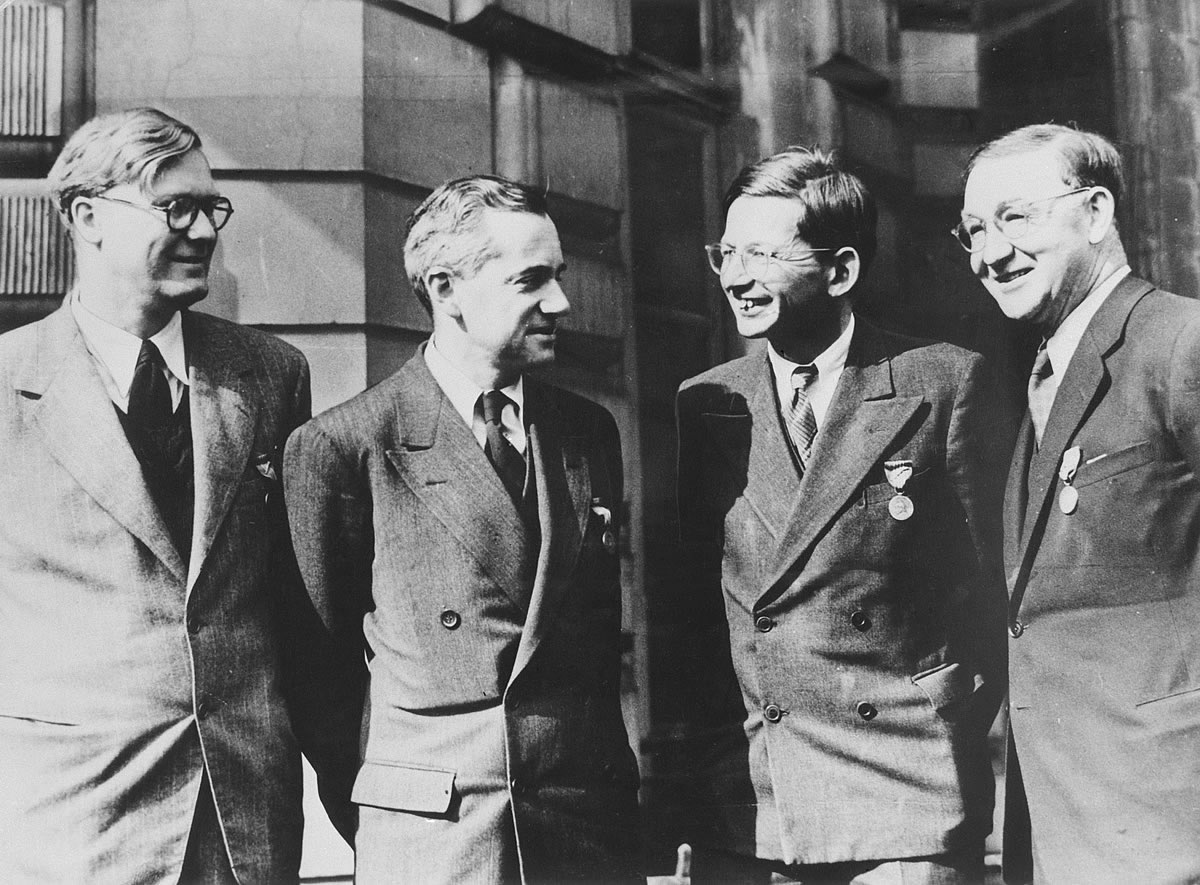
Key British physicists. Left to right: William Penney, Otto Robert Frisch, Rudolf Peierls and John Cockcroft. They are wearing the American Medal of Freedom.

Chadwick did not believe that there was any likelihood of another war with Germany in 1939, and took his family for a holiday on a remote lake in northern Sweden. The news of the outbreak of the Second World War therefore came as a shock. Determined not to spend another war in an internment camp, Chadwick made his way to Stockholm as fast as he could, but when he arrived there with his family, he found that all air traffic between Stockholm and London had been suspended. They made their way back to England on a tramp steamer. When he reached Liverpool, Chadwick found Joseph Rotblat, a Polish postdoctoral fellow who had come to work with the cyclotron, was now destitute, as he was cut off from funds from Poland. Chadwick promptly hired Rotblat as a lecturer, despite his poor grasp of English.

In October 1939, Chadwick received a letter from Edward Appleton, the Secretary of the Department of Scientific and Industrial Research, asking for his opinion on the feasibility of an atomic bomb. Chadwick responded cautiously. He did not dismiss the possibility, but carefully went over the many theoretical and practical difficulties involved. Chadwick decided to investigate the properties of uranium oxide further with Rotblat. In March 1940, Otto Frisch and Rudolf Peierls at the University of Birmingham re-examined the theoretical issues involved in a paper that became known as the Frisch–Peierls memorandum. Instead of looking at unenriched uranium oxide, they considered what would happen to a sphere of pure uranium-235, and found that not only could a chain reaction occur, but that it might require as little as 1 kilogram (2.2 lb) of uranium-235, and unleash the energy of tons of dynamite.

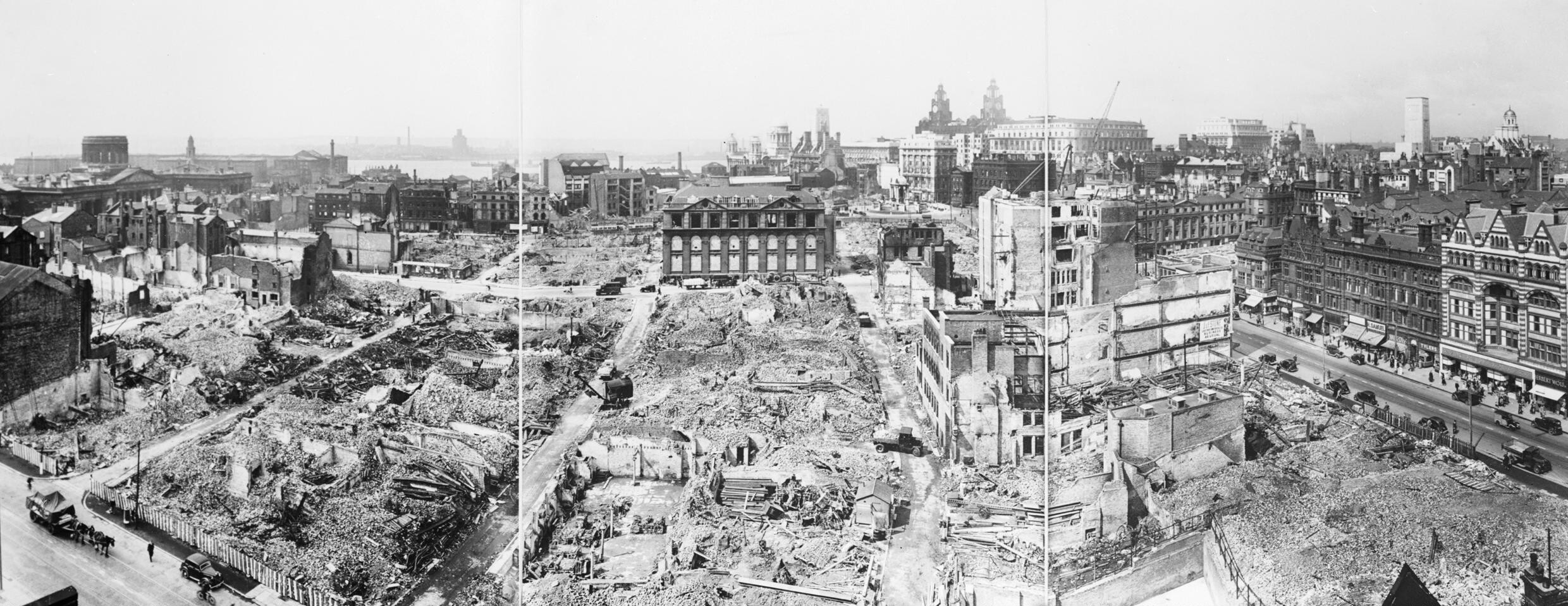
Part of Liverpool devastated by the Blitz.

A special subcommittee of the Committee for the Scientific Survey of Air Warfare (CSSAW), known as the MAUD Committee, was created to investigate the matter further. It was chaired by George Paget Thomson, and its original membership included Chadwick, along with Mark Oliphant, John Cockcroft, and Philip Moon. While other teams investigated uranium enrichment techniques, Chadwick's team at Liverpool concentrated on determining the nuclear cross section of uranium-235. By April 1941, it had been experimentally confirmed that the critical mass of uranium-235 might be 8 kilograms (18 lb) or less. His research into such matters was complicated by all-but-incessant Luftwaffe bombings of the environs of his Liverpool lab; the windows were blown out so often that they were replaced by cardboard.

In July 1941, Chadwick was chosen to write the final draft of the MAUD Report, which, when presented by Vannevar Bush to President Franklin D. Roosevelt in October 1941, inspired the U.S. government to pour millions of dollars into the pursuit of an atom bomb. When George B. Pegram and Harold Urey visited Britain to see how the project, now known as Tube Alloys, was going, Chadwick was able to tell them: "I wish I could tell you that the bomb is not going to work, but I am 90 per cent sure that it will."

In a recent book about the Bomb project, Graham Farmelo wrote that "Chadwick did more than any other scientist to give Churchill the Bomb. ... Chadwick was tested almost to the breaking point." So worried that he could not sleep, Chadwick resorted to sleeping pills, which he continued to take for most of his remaining years. Chadwick later said that he realised that "a nuclear bomb was not only possible—it was inevitable. Sooner or later these ideas could not be peculiar to us. Everybody would think about them before long, and some country would put them into action". Sir Hermann Bondi suggested that it was fortunate that Chadwick, not Rutherford, was the doyen of UK physics at the time, as the latter's prestige might otherwise have overpowered Chadwick's interest in "looking forward" to the Bomb's prospects.

=== Manhattan Project ===
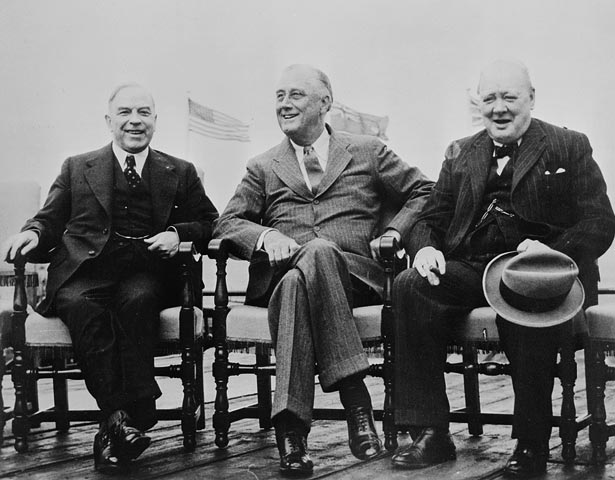
Mackenzie King, Franklin D. Roosevelt and Winston Churchill at the first Quebec Conference, 1943.

Owing to the danger from aerial bombardment, the Chadwicks sent their twins to Canada as part of a government evacuation scheme. Chadwick was reluctant to move Tube Alloys there, believing that the United Kingdom was a better location for the isotope separation plant. The enormous scope of the effort became more apparent in 1942: even a pilot separation plant would cost over £1 million and strain Britain's resources, to say nothing of a full-scale plant, which was estimated to cost somewhere in the vicinity of £25 million. It would have to be built in America. At the same time that the British became convinced that a joint project was necessary, the progress of the American Manhattan Project was such that British cooperation seemed less essential, although the Americans were still eager to use Chadwick's talents.

The matter of cooperation had to be taken up at the highest level. In September 1943, Prime Minister Winston Churchill and President Roosevelt negotiated the Quebec Agreement, which reinstated cooperation between Britain, the United States, and Canada. Chadwick, Oliphant, Peierls and Simon were summoned to the United States by the director of Tube Alloys, Sir Wallace Akers, to work with the Manhattan Project. The Quebec Agreement established a new Combined Policy Committee to direct the joint project. The Americans disliked Akers, so Chadwick was appointed technical advisor to the Combined Policy Committee, and the head of the British Mission.

Leaving Rotblat in charge in Liverpool, Chadwick began a tour of the Manhattan Project facilities in November 1943, except for the Hanford Site where plutonium was produced, which he was not allowed to see. He became the only man, apart from Groves and his second in command, to have access to all the American research and production facilities for the uranium bomb. Observing the work on the K-25 gaseous diffusion facility at Oak Ridge, Tennessee, Chadwick realised how wrong he had been about building the plant in wartime Britain. The enormous structure could never have been concealed from the Luftwaffe. In early 1944, he moved to Los Alamos, New Mexico, with his wife and their twins, who now spoke with Canadian accents. For security reasons, he was given the cover name of James Chaffee.

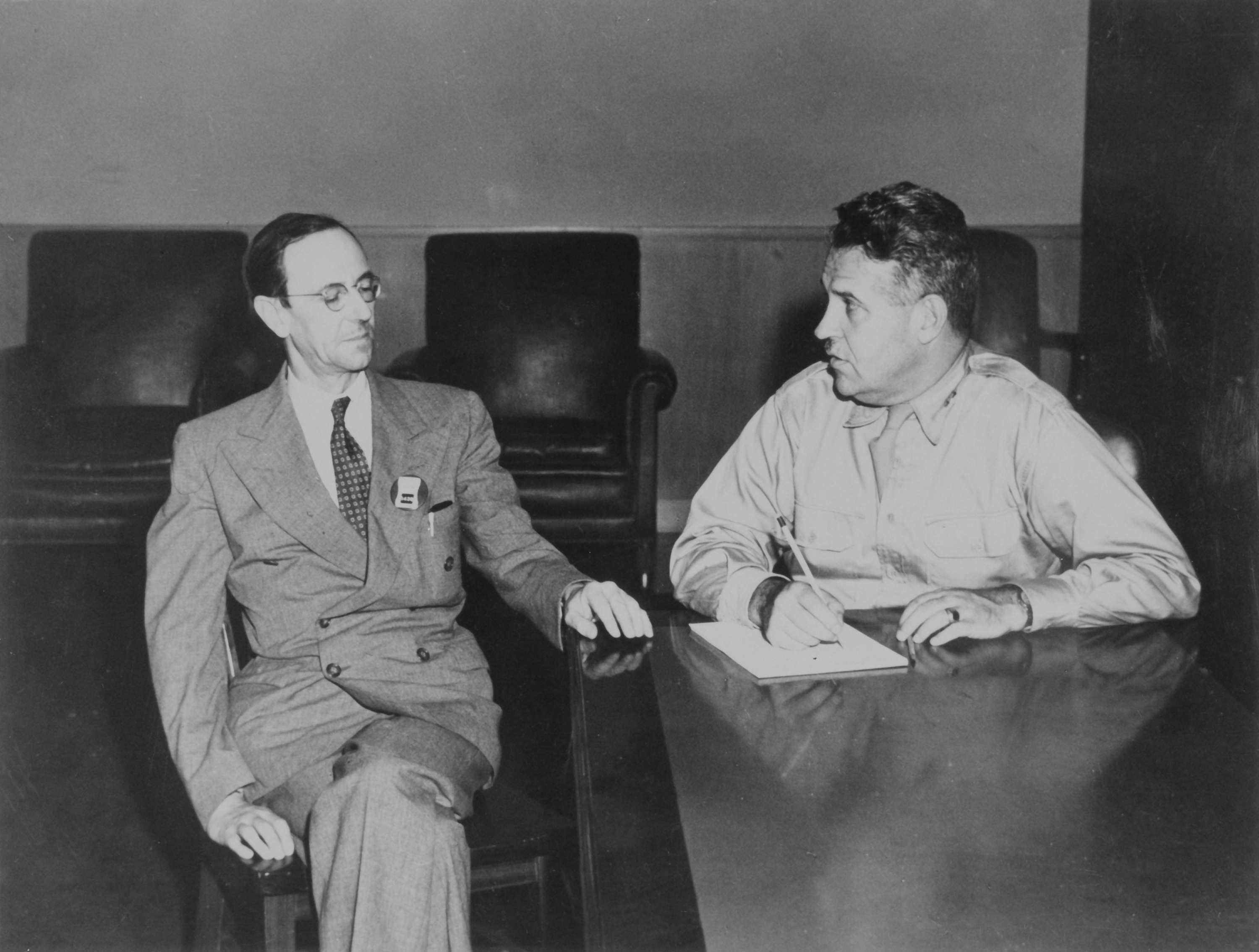
Chadwick (left) with Major General Leslie R. Groves, Jr., the director of the Manhattan Project.

Chadwick accepted that the Americans did not need British help, but that it could still be useful in bringing the project to an early and successful conclusion. Working closely with the director of the Manhattan Project, Major General Leslie R. Groves, Jr., he attempted to do everything he could to support the effort. He also endeavoured to place British scientists in as many parts of the project as possible to facilitate a post-war British nuclear weapons project to which Chadwick was committed. Requests from Groves via Chadwick for particular scientists tended to be met with an immediate rejection by the company, ministry or university currently employing them, only to be overcome by the overriding priority accorded to Tube Alloys. As a result, the British team was critical to the Project's success.

Although he had more knowledge of the project than anyone else from Britain, Chadwick had no access to the Hanford site. Lord Portal was offered a tour of Hanford in 1946. "This was the only plant to which Chadwick had been denied access in wartime, and now he asked Groves if he could accompany Portal. Groves replied that he could, but if he did then 'Portal will not see very much'." For his efforts, Chadwick received a knighthood in the New Year Honours on 1 January 1945. He considered this to be a recognition of the work of the whole Tube Alloys project.

By early 1945, Chadwick was spending most of his time in Washington, D.C., and his family relocated from Los Alamos to a house on Washington's Dupont Circle in April 1945. He was present at the meeting of the Combined Policy Committee on 4 July when Field Marshal Sir Henry Maitland Wilson gave Britain's agreement to use the atomic bomb against Japan, and at the Trinity nuclear test on 16 July, when the first atom bomb was detonated. Inside its pit was a polonium-beryllium modulated neutron initiator, a development of the technique that Chadwick had used to discover the neutron over a decade before. William L. Laurence, a reporter from The New York Times attached to the Manhattan Project, wrote that "never before in history had any man lived to see his own discovery materialize itself with such telling effect on the destiny of man."

== Later life ==
Shortly after the war ended, Chadwick was appointed to the Advisory Committee on Atomic Energy (ACAE). He was also appointed as the British scientific advisor to the United Nations Atomic Energy Commission. He clashed with fellow ACAE member Patrick Blackett, who disagreed with Chadwick's conviction that Britain needed to acquire its own nuclear weapons; but it was Chadwick's position that was ultimately adopted. He returned to Britain in 1946, to find a country still beset by wartime rationing and shortages.

At this time, Sir James Mountford, the Vice Chancellor of the University of Liverpool, wrote in his diary "he had never seen a man 'so physically, mentally and spiritually tired" as Chadwick, for he "had plumbed such depths of moral decision as more fortunate men are never called upon even to peer into ... [and suffered] ... almost insupportable agonies of responsibility arising from his scientific work'."

In September 1949 Edward Teller was in England to discuss nuclear power and safety, and was dining with Sir James Chadwick and his wife at their home in Cambridge. His wife was a charming conversationalist but Sir James was (typically) taciturn. When Teller made an unflattering comment on Groves, he became very talkative, saying that the project would never have succeeded without Groves: while acknowledging his dislike of the British.

In 1948, Chadwick accepted an offer to become Master of Gonville and Caius College, Cambridge. The job was prestigious but ill-defined; the Master was the titular head of the college, but authority actually resided in a council of 13 fellows, of whom one was the Master. As Master, Chadwick strove to improve the academic reputation of the college. He increased the number of research fellowships from 31 to 49, and sought to bring talent into the college. This involved controversial decisions, such as hiring in 1951 the Chinese biochemist Tien-chin Tsao and the Hungarian-born economist Peter Bauer. In what became known as the Peasants' Revolt, fellows led by Patrick Hadley voted an old friend of Chadwick's off the council and replaced him with Bauer. More friends of Chadwick's were removed over the following years, and he retired in November 1958. It was during his mastership that Francis Crick, a Ph.D. student at Gonville and Caius College,Rosalind Franklin and James Watson discovered the structure of DNA.

By the 1970s Chadwick became more frail, and seldom left his flat, although he travelled to Liverpool for celebrations of his eightieth birthday. A lifelong atheist, he saw no reason to adopt religious faith in later life. He died in his sleep on 24 July 1974 in Cambridge at the age of 82.

== Recognition ==
=== Memberships ===
| Year | Organisation | Type | Ref. |
|---|---|---|---|
| 1927 | Royal Society | Fellow | |
| 1946 | Royal Netherlands Academy of Arts and Sciences | Foreign Member | |
| 1948 | American Philosophical Society | International Member | |

=== Awards ===
| Year | Organisation | Award | Citation | Ref. |
|---|---|---|---|---|
| 1932 | Royal Society | Hughes Medal | "For his researches on radioactivity." | |
| 1935 | Royal Swedish Academy of Sciences | Nobel Prize in Physics | "For the discovery of the neutron." | |
| 1950 | Royal Society | Copley Medal | "For his outstanding work in nuclear physics and in the development of atomic energy, especially for his discovery of the neutron." | |
| 1950 | Institution of Electrical Engineers | Faraday Medal | — | |
| 1951 | Franklin Institute | Franklin Medal | "For the identification of the neutron as part of the nucleus of the atom." | |

=== Honours ===
| Year | Country | Honour | Ref. |
|---|---|---|---|
| 1945 | United Kingdom | Knight Bachelor | |
| 1966 | West Germany | Pour le Mérite | |
| 1970 | United Kingdom | Order of the Companions of Honour | |

== Commemoration ==
- Chadwick's papers are held at the Churchill Archives Centre in Cambridge, and are accessible to the public.
- The Chadwick Laboratory at the University of Liverpool.
- Sir James Chadwick Chair of Experimental Physics, also at the University of Liverpool. Named in 1991 as part of celebrations of the centenary of his birth.
- James Chadwick Building, which houses part of the School of Chemical Engineering and Analytical Sciences, University of Manchester, as well as the Industrial Hub for Sustainable Engineering.
- Chadwick was described by the United Kingdom Atomic Energy Authority official historian Lorna Arnold as "a physicist, a scientist-diplomat, and a good, wise, and humane man."
- Chadwick crater on the Moon

== Notes ==
Academic offices
| Preceded by John Forbes Cameron | Master of Gonville and Caius College; 1948–1959 | Succeeded by Sir Nevill Francis Mott |
