= Ruhleben internment camp =

World War I civilian detention camp in Germany

Coordinates: 52.531238°N 13.2328°E

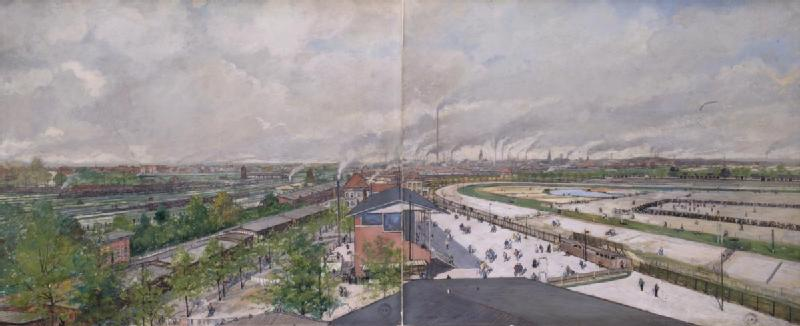
Panoramic view of Ruhleben internment camp by Nico Jungmann, one of the detainees

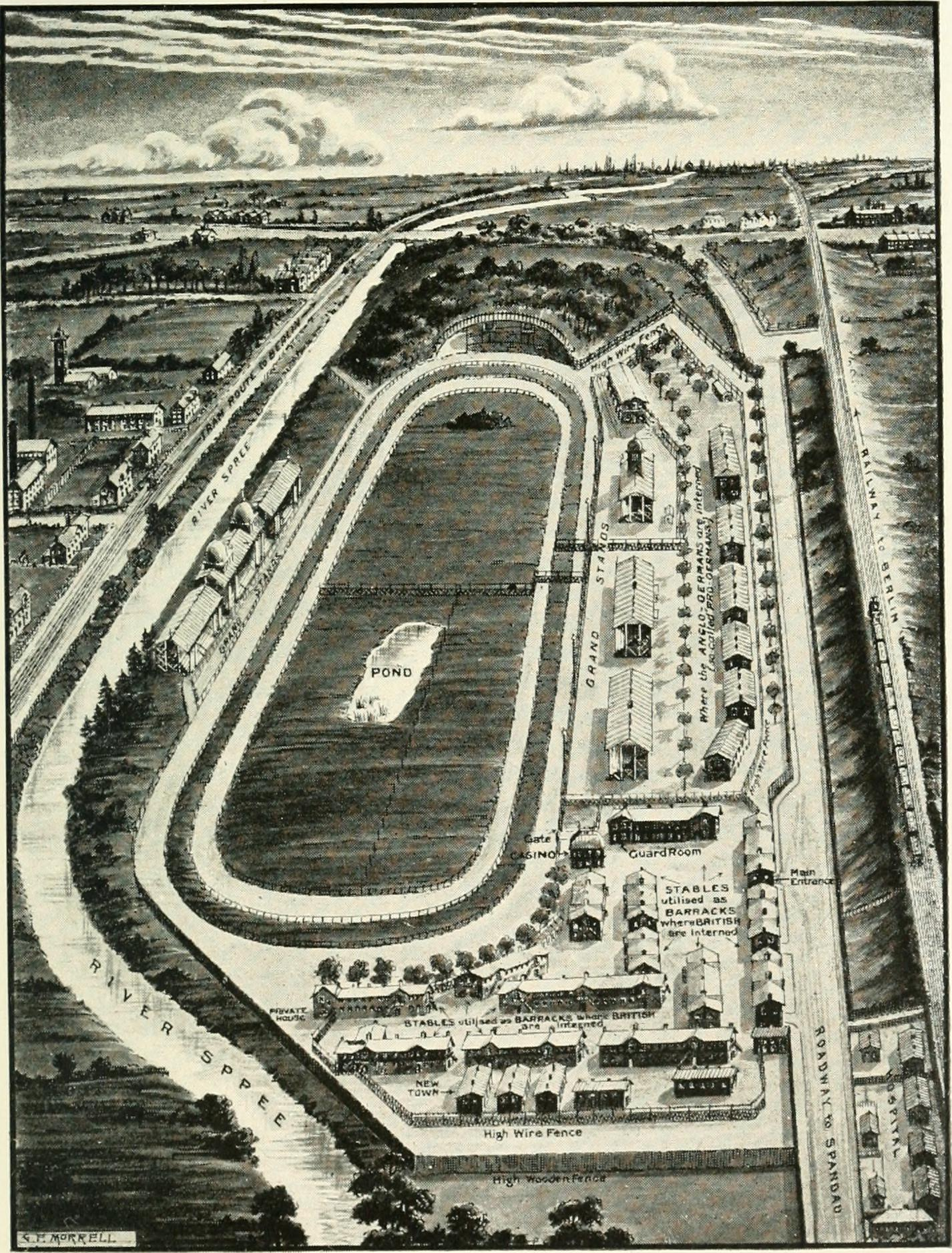
Bird's eye view of the camp

Ruhleben internment camp was a civilian detention camp in Germany during World War I. It was located in Ruhleben, a former Vorwerk manor 10 km (6.2 mi) to the west of Berlin. This area is now split between the districts of Spandau and Charlottenburg-Wilmersdorf. The camp was developed on the site of a harness racing track laid out in 1908 north of the Berlin-Hamburg Railway line.

== Detainees ==
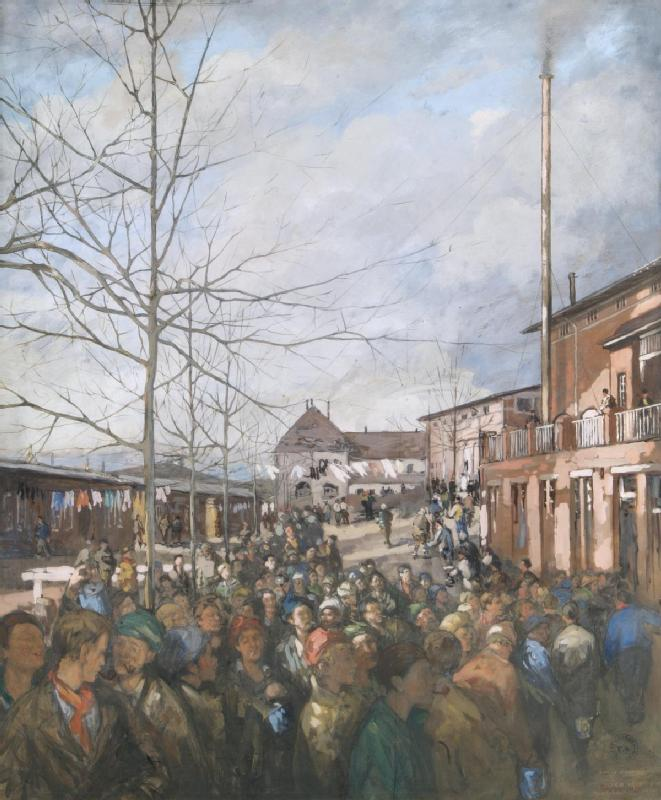
Detainees queuing for Christmas dinner: painting by Nico Jungman

The camp detainees included male citizens of the Allied Powers who were living, studying, working or on holiday in Germany at the outbreak of World War I. They also included the crews of several civilian ships stranded in German harbours or captured at sea. There were numerous fishermen captured from trawlers which had been sunk in the North Sea in the first days of the war: they were mainly men from Hull, Yorkshire; and Grimsby and Boston, Lincolnshire. Numbers in the camp varied between 4,000 and 5,500 prisoners, most of them British.

Life in the camp was described in several books and essays subsequently written by detainees. They included To Ruhleben – And Back (1916) by Geoffrey Pyke, who had successfully escaped from the camp in 1915; and Life in Ruhleben, 1914–1918 (1920) by Frederick Keel. Quarters were cramped: the stable blocks averaged 27 stalls, each housing six men, and the stable block lofts each housed about 200 men.

The German authorities adhered to the Geneva Convention and allowed the camp detainees to administer their own internal affairs. Gradually, a mini-society evolved. Letters, books, sports equipment and a printing press were all allowed into the camp, and the detainees organised their own police force, magazine, library and postal service. The latter, known as the Ruhleben Express Delivery, was organised by Albert Kamps and began operating in July 1915. Soon it was handling over 6,000 pieces of mail per month, and 16 different postage stamps were issued which have since become collector's items. In April 1916, however, the German postal authorities declared the service illegal and it ceased operating.

Prisoners grew flowers beside their barracks to provide a bit of beauty; this later evolved into the Ruhleben Horticultural Society, which became a formal affiliate in October 1916 of the Royal Horticultural Society in London (subscription fee waived). Later they grew their own vegetables in the centre of the race track as fresh produce became harder to acquire. In addition, a number of independent businesses developed within the camp, including a casino.

== Arts and culture ==
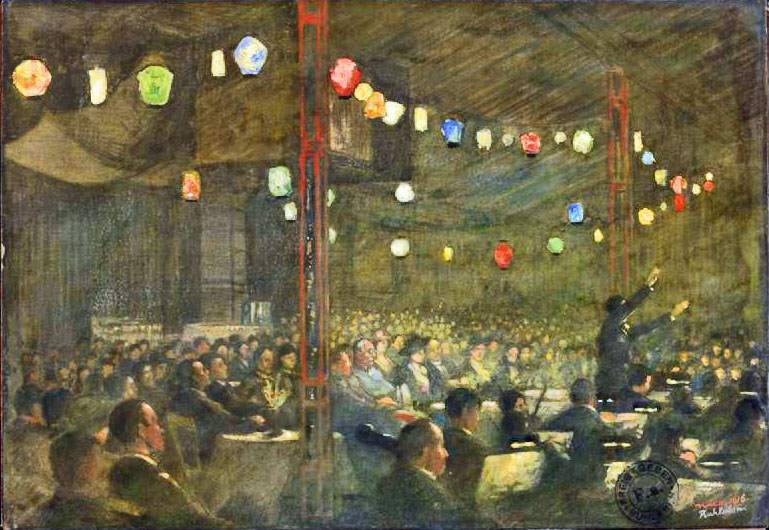
Gala performance of The Mikado: painting by Nico Jungman

The detainees arranged their own entertainment. Among them were several musicians, including Ernest MacMillan, later to become a conductor of the Toronto Symphony Orchestra. Other British musicians included Edgar Bainton, Edward Clark and the Australian-born Arthur Benjamin. MacMillan was a prominent member of the Ruhleben Musical Society, formed in 1915, and directed performances of The Mikado (with orchestra and costumes) and a pantomime version of Cinderella. MacMillan transcribed the music for the former from memory with the help of four other musicians, including Benjamin Dale. Among those who attended these performances were James W. Gerard, the United States ambassador. The detainees also presented Trial by Jury, The Pirates of Penzance, The Yeomen of the Guard and The Gondoliers. MacMillan gave lectures on each of Beethoven's symphonies, which were followed by piano duet performances played by him together with Benjamin Dale. MacMillan was also a member of the Ruhleben Drama Society and acted in productions of Othello, Twelfth Night, Lady Windermere's Fan and The Importance of Being Earnest.

The artist Charles Freegrove Winzer was interned at the camp, and provided illustrations for the camp magazine. His detention was contested, because he worked for the French Red Cross, and had been visiting his sister in Germany with permission of the military authorities there. Some of his lithographs, depicting life in the camp, are now in the Australian War Memorial collection.

=== Education ===
The British Government provided internees with books for educational purposes for free. A wooden hall erected by the YMCA, which housed the library of about 5000 volumes sent over from Britain, served as a place for reading.

Detainees also arranged their own school and ′college′. A Ruhleben Camp School offered elementary and high school education to younger internees. Within the Arts and Science Union, organised by the British chemist and inventor Henry Stafford Hatfield, scholars from different fields gave lectures of university standard, organised in the open air. Among the lecturers were the physicists James Chadwick, Charles D. Ellis and Henry Brose, and the historian and author John Cecil Masterman.

== Sports ==
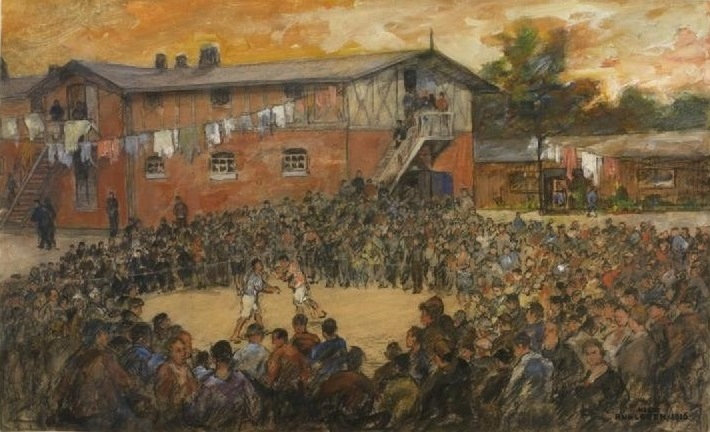
Boxing match: painting by Nico Jungman

Sports also played a major role in the lives of the detainees. Among them were several former professional footballers, including three former England internationals, Fred Pentland, Samuel Wolstenholme and Steve Bloomer; a Scotland international, John Cameron; a German international, Edwin Dutton; and John Brearley, once of Everton and Tottenham Hotspur. The Ruhleben Football Association was formed with Pentland as chairman and Cameron as secretary. Cup and league competitions were organised with teams representing the individual camp barracks. Around 500 prisoners played in the football competitions. Several thousand spectators attended the bigger games. A series of exhibition and "international" matches were also organised. On 2 May 1915 an "England XI" featuring Pentland, Wolstenholme, Brearley and Bloomer played a "World XI" captained by Cameron. Towards the end of the war an international triangular tournament called the Coupe de Allies, featuring a "British XI", a "French XI" and a "Belgium XI", was organised.

Other sports such as cricket, rugby, tennis and golf were also popular within the camp. In May 1915 a "Ruhleben XI", featuring Bloomer and Brearley, played a "Varsities XI" in the Ruhleben Cricket League. In July 1916 a "Lancashire XI", featuring Bloomer, beat a "Yorkshire XI" that included Wolstenholme.

== Notable detainees ==
- F. Charles Adler
- Edgar Bainton
- John Balfour
- Winthrop Pickard Bell
- Arthur Benjamin
- Steve Bloomer
- Roland Bocquet
- John Brearley
- Henry Brose
- John Cameron
- Sir James Chadwick
- Edward Clark
- Israel Cohen
- Benjamin Dale
- Sefton Delmer
- Dr Arthur Henry Douthwaite
- William Huntley Drummond, 6th Earl of Perth
- Edwin Dutton
- Harry Edward, first British black Olympian and medalist (1920)
- Sir Charles D. Ellis
- Charles Fryatt
- Francis Gribble
- Percy Hartley
- Percy Hull
- Nico Jungmann
- Frederick Keel
- John D. Ketchum
- Peter Carl Mackay, alias Prince Monolulu
- Ernest MacMillan
- Thomas Humphrey Marshall
- John Cecil Masterman
- George Merritt
- Michael Pease
- Fred Pentland
- Matthew Stewart Prichard
- Geoffrey Pyke
- R. M. Smyllie
- Fred Spiksley
- Jascha Spivakovsky
- Tom Sullivan
- Bryceson Treharne
- Samuel Wolstenholme

== See also ==
- World War I prisoners of war in Germany
- List of prisoner-of-war camps in Germany
- List of concentration and internment camps
- Holzminden internment camp
