= Sam Wolstenholme (footballer) =

English footballer (1878–1933)

Personal information
- Full name: Samuel Wolstenholme
- Date of birth: 16 March 1877
- Place of birth: Little Lever, England
- Date of death: 20 October 1945 aged 68
- Place of death: Bolton, England
- Height: 5 ft 9 1/2 in (1.77 m)
- Position: Defender

Youth career
- –: Darley Vale
- –: Farmworth FC
- –: Farmworth Alliance
- –1897: Horwich

Senior career*
Years	Team	Apps	(Gls)
1897–1904	Everton	160	(8)
1904–1908	Blackburn Rovers	97	(1)
1908–1909	Croydon Common		
1909–1913	Norwich City	138	(7)
1913	Chester		

International career
1904–1905	England	3	(0)

Managerial career
- 1924–1926: Gimnástica de Torrelavega
- * Club domestic league appearances and goals

Samuel Wolstenholme (16 March 1877 – 20 October 1945) was an English footballer who played for, among others Everton, Blackburn Rovers, Norwich City and England. He played alongside Steve Bloomer and Vivian Woodward in the England teams that won the British Home Championship in 1904 and 1905. He also played twice for The North XI against The South XI and played for the English League XI against the Scottish League XI.

After retiring as a player in 1913, Wolstenholme accepted a coaching position in Germany. In the spring of 1914, he was appointed by the Norddeutscher Fußball-Verband (North German Football Association) as team coach/manager of their representative XI. However while there, the First World War broke out and he was subsequently interned at Ruhleben, a civilian detention camp near Berlin. The camp contained between 4,000 and 5,500 prisoners. Gradually a mini-society evolved and football became a popular activity. Wolstenholme was one of several former professional footballers in the camp. Others included fellow former England internationals Fred Pentland and Steve Bloomer, a German international Edwin Dutton and two fellow former Evertonians, John Cameron and John Brearley.

Wolstenholme was a prominent member of the Ruhleben Football Association. Cup and league competitions were organised and as many as 1,000 attended the bigger games. The teams adopted the names of established teams and November 1914 Wolstenholme refereed a cup final between Tottenham Hotspur and Oldham Athletic. Among the players participating were Bloomer and Dutton. On 2 May 1915 an England XI featuring Wolstenholme, Pentland, Brearley and Bloomer played a World XI captained by Cameron. Wolstenholme also played cricket at Rubleben and in July 1916 played for a Yorkshire XI that lost to a Lancashire XI, featuring Bloomer.

== Honours ==
England

- British Home Championship: 2
  - 1904, 1905
