= John Brearley =

English footballer and manager

Personal information
- Date of birth: October 1875
- Place of birth: West Derby, Liverpool, England
- Date of death: 1944 (aged 68–69)
- Position: Forward

Senior career*
Years	Team	Apps	(Gls)
18??–1897	Kettering Town		
1897–1898	Notts County		
1898–1899	Chatham		
1899–1900	Millwall Athletic		
1900–1901	Notts County		
1901–1902	Middlesbrough		
1902–1903	Everton		(7)
1903–1907	Tottenham Hotspur	70	(7)
1907–1909	Crystal Palace	71	(3)
1909–1911	Millwall Athletic		

Managerial career
- 1909–1911: Millwall Athletic
- 19??–1915: Viktoria 89 Berlin
- * Club domestic league appearances and goals

John Brearley (October 1875 – 1944) was an English football player and manager. He played as a forward for several clubs, most notably Millwall Athletic, Everton and Tottenham Hotspur. He was able to play in at least five outfield positions, but had a preference for playing inside-right. During the First World War he was interned at Ruhleben, a civilian detention camp in Germany.

== Playing career ==
Brearley played 51 games and scored 13 goals for Millwall Athletic as he helped them win the Southern League District Combination and reach the semi-final of the FA Cup in 1900. He made his debut for Everton against WBA in September 1902 and subsequently made 24 appearances and scored 8 goals for the club. He finished as Everton's top league goalscorer in 1902–03 with 7 goals. Among his teammates at Everton were Samuel Wolstenholme. He was then signed for Tottenham by former Evertonian, John Cameron and went on to score 24 goals in 133 games for them. Among his teammates at Tottenham were Vivian Woodward. In January 1905 he played for a Professionals of the South XI against an Amateurs of the South XI during an England trial at White Hart Lane. He signed for Crystal Palace (then playing in the Southern League) in May 1907 and made 71 league appearances (3 goals) for the club between then and 1909. He finished his playing career with a return to Millwall Athletic as a player-coach in 1909.

== Prisoner in Germany ==
Brearley subsequently worked as a coach at Viktoria 89 Berlin in Germany. While there the First World War broke out and he was interned at Ruhleben, a civilian detention camp in the Spandau district of Berlin. Brearley was one of several former professional footballers at Ruhleben. Among them were his former Everton teammate, Samuel Wolstenholme, and his former manager at Tottenham, John Cameron. Others included former England internationals Fred Pentland and Steve Bloomer and a former German international Edwin Dutton. The camp contained between 4,000 and 5,500 prisoners. Gradually a mini-society evolved and football became a popular activity. Cup and league competitions were organised and as many as 1,000 attended the bigger games. On 2 May 1915 an England XI featuring Brearley, Pentland, Wolstenholme and Bloomer played a World XI captained by Cameron. Brearley also captained the Barracks 10 team that won a cup competition in 1915. He also played cricket at the camp and in May 1915 played for a Rubleben XI, which also included Bloomer, against a Varsities XI in the Rubleban Cricket League. A John Brearley was also listed as one of several Freemasons at the camp.

Brearley died in 1944, aged 68 or 69.
