= Steve Bloomer =

English footballer and manager (1874–1938)

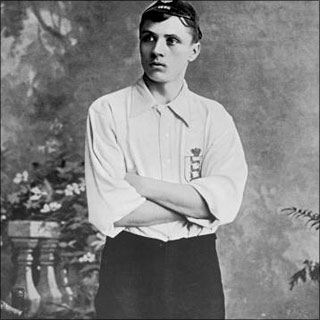
- Bloomer in England kit

Personal information
- Full name: Stephen Bloomer
- Date of birth: 20 January 1874
- Place of birth: Cradley, Worcestershire, England
- Date of death: 16 April 1938 (aged 64)
- Place of death: Derby, England
- Height: 5 ft 8 in (1.73 m)
- Position: Forward

Youth career
- 1886–1888: St. Chad's Juniors
- 1888–1891: Derby Swifts

Senior career*
Years	Team	Apps	(Gls)
1891	Derby Midland		
1891–1906	Derby County	376	(240)
1906–1910	Middlesbrough	125	(59)
1910–1914	Derby County	98	(53)
Total		599	(352)

International career
1895–1907	England	23	(28)

Managerial career
- 1914: Britannia Berlin 92
- 1918: Blauw-Wit Amsterdam
- 1920–1922: Derby County
- 1922: Grenadier Guards
- 1922–1923: Derby County
- 1923–1925: Real Unión
- * Club domestic league appearances and goals

Stephen Bloomer (20 January 1874 – 16 April 1938) was an England international footballer and manager who played for Derby County – becoming their record goalscorer – and Middlesbrough. The anthem "Steve Bloomer's Watchin'" is played at every Derby home game and there is a bust of him at the Pride Park Stadium. He is also listed in the Football League 100 Legends and English Football Hall of Fame.

During his career, Bloomer was a prolific goalscorer for both club and country. A quick-thinking forward, he was able to shoot powerfully and accurately with either foot and his speciality was the daisy cutter – a low shot, hit with great power, speed and accuracy. In 535 First Division games he scored 314 goals and, after Jimmy Greaves, he is the second-highest all-time goalscorer in the top-flight of English football. He also scored 28 goals in 23 appearances for England. He helped Derby to win the Second Division title in 1911–12, and to finish second in the First Division in 1895–96; he also played on the losing side in four FA Cup semi-finals and three FA Cup finals (1898, 1899 and 1903).

Bloomer also played baseball for Derby Baseball Club and helped them become British champions three times in the 1890s. After retiring as a footballer he became a coach and worked with clubs in Germany, the Netherlands and Spain. During World War I he was interned at Ruhleben, a civilian detention camp. The highlight of his coaching career came in 1924 when he guided Real Unión to victory in the Copa del Rey.

== Family and early life ==
Bloomer was born in Cradley, Worcestershire (now the West Midlands) to Caleb Bloomer (a blacksmith / iron foundry worker) and Merab Dunn, on 20 January 1874. He was the eldest of six children. The family moved to Litchurch, Derbyshire five years later. Caleb began working for Ley's Malleable Castings foundry in Derby which was founded by Francis Ley. At the age of 12 Bloomer left school, and started working as an apprentice for a local blacksmith. This helped him to build strength.

Bloomer had an aptitude for football that he later described as "a natural gift". He first made an impression on the Derby football scene playing for St. Chad's Choir on 11 April 1887. Bloomer was on the losing side of the 1887 Derbyshire Boys' Shield under-15 final on this date, and impressed despite his team losing 14–0 to a dominant St Luke's Choir. His mother died on 27 November 1887 at 87, Yates Street in Derby.

In 1888, soon after his 14th birthday Stephen began working as a 'striker' at Ley's iron foundry, where his father Caleb, and uncle Farley worked. In 1888 he also began playing football for Derby Swifts in the Derbyshire Minor League. On 20 December 1890, at Belper he scored seven goals against Belper Town in a 22–2 win. In 1891 he appeared in the Midland League for Derby Midland, playing in a 1–1 draw with Burton Swifts on 27 March.

== Playing career ==
=== Club ===
==== Derby County ====
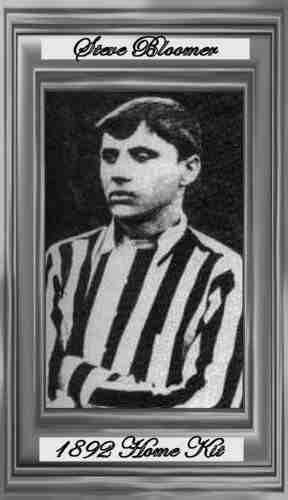
Bloomer as a Derby player in 1892

Derby County merged with Derby Midland in June 1891, and Bloomer was a Derby County player for the start of the 1891–92 – the fourth season of the Football League. He chose to retain his amateur status because he wanted to help out his team Derby Swifts in their shield competition. Bloomer turned out for the third-team twice, and the second team once in this season. He signed a professional contract for Derby County on Thursday 28 April 1892. Mr. Clarke, the Secretary of Burton Wanderers also tried to sign Bloomer for his club. Two days after he signed for Derby, he tried to persuade Bloomer to sign for his club, but he refused. He was approached by Mr. Clarke again on Monday 2 May 1892, and this time signed a professional contract with Burton Wanderers but the Football Association soon ruled the contract to be invalid and reprimanded the Burton official. A hearing of the case was held at Crewe, on 25 January 1893. (Note: "Bloomer was called as a witness, and he said that in April last he signed for Derby County. That was on a Thursday, and on the following Saturday Mr. Clarke, the secretary of Burton Wanderers, who was 'after' Bloomer himself, tried to persuade Bloomer to throw in his lot with the brewery club. Bloomer declined, but he alleges that on the next Monday he was at a dance, when Mr. Clarke again approached him. The Burton secretary is said to have used undue influence over Bloomer, whose extreme youth was urged as some excuse for his conduct, and the Derby lad signed a registration form in favour of Burton Wanderers.")

An administrative error by Derby secretary William Parker meant that Ernest Hickinbottom, Jimmy McLachlan and Samuel Mills were ineligible for the opening game of the 1892–93 season against Stoke at the Victoria Ground, and Bloomer was a surprise late addition to the first eleven. Hickinbottom, McLachlan and Mills had been registered a day too late and so they could not play unless by special permission, which could not be granted in time. Bloomer later claimed many times that he scored twice during the game but contemporary reports instead credited him with scoring just one goal, which was the second of Derby's goals in the 3–1 win. The local papers credited Johnny McMillan with scoring the first goal for Derby County in this game, and Frederick George Ekins getting the third goal for the team. Steve Bloomer's performance in this game was reviewed very positively in the local papers. (Note: "Young Bloomer, who has heretofore been seen only in junior matches in Derby, seems likely to prove a rare good find for the club, and his performance on Saturday is a tribute to the soundness of John Goodall's judgement, as the committee were largely guided by the captain's opinion in making the selection." "Young Bloomer, too, ought to be heard of again in the first team, and if he continues to improve as he has done hitherto, he will make one of the finest forwards in the Association game.") He remained a key member of the first team, and was also given penalty taking duties, and finished the campaign with 11 goals from 28 matches. Veteran striker and captain John Goodall helped to improve his game, helping to improve his ball control and positional skills.

He missed seven games of the 1893–94 season after Leicester Fosse half-back Peggy Lord broke his collarbone on 10 February. Bloomer recovered and claimed 19 goals from 27 appearances during the campaign.

Derby struggled during the 1894–95 campaign, and Bloomer was limited to 10 goals in 29 league games as County finished in 15th place and forced to play a test match against Notts County at Filbert Street to retain their First Division status. Notts County were leading 1–0 with seven minutes to go, but goals from Goodall and Bloomer gave Derby the win.

Bloomer opened the 1895–96 season by scoring both goals in a 2–0 win over Sunderland in the club's new permanent home at the Baseball Ground (the club had actually already played two first team games at the ground in 1892 due to scheduling conflicts at the County Ground). Derby finished the season in second-place behind Aston Villa and exited the FA Cup at the semi-finals after losing 2–1 to Wolverhampton Wanderers.

While at Derby, he was top scorer in the First Division on five occasions in 1896, 1897, 1899, 1901 and 1904. In 1896, together with John Campbell of Aston Villa. He was also the leading "Rams" scorer for 14 consecutive seasons and scored 17 hat-tricks in the league. One of his best seasons came in 1896–97 when he scored 31 goals, including five hat-tricks, in 33 League and FA Cup games. Between 14 November 1896 and 5 April 1897 he scored 21 goals in 20 games. He also scored six goals for the club in a game against Sheffield Wednesday in January 1899.

Bloomer's goals helped Derby finish runners-up in the First Division in 1896 and helped them reach three FA Cup finals in 1898, 1899 and 1903. He scored in the 1898 final, a 3–1 defeat to Nottingham Forest. On 3 September 1900 Bloomer scored the first-ever goal at The Hawthorns, the 1–1 draw against West Bromwich Albion being the first match played at the ground.

==== Middlesbrough ====
On 15 March 1906 Bloomer joined Middlesbrough for a fee of £750. Among teammates at his new club were Alf Common, the first £1,000 footballer, and Fred Pentland. He was top-scorer at Middlesbrough in both the 1906–07 and 1907–08 seasons. He also scored four goals in a game against Woolwich Arsenal on 5 January 1907.

==== Return to Derby County ====
After four years at Middlesbrough, he returned to the Rams in 1910 and helped them win the Second Division title in 1912. He scored his last league goal for Derby against Sheffield United on 6 September 1913 and his last match for the Derby County first team, was against Burnley on 31 January 1914 when he was 40 years and 11 days.

=== International ===
Bloomer made his England debut on 9 March 1895, scoring twice in a 9–0 win against Ireland, which helped England win the British Home Championship. The Sporting Life viewed Bloomer as being the best forward on the field for England in this game with Billy Bassett coming a close second. (Note: "It was extremely satisfying to see Bloomer make such a capable partner for Bassett, and it would be unjust if we did not give the young lad deserving praise. To say he was the best forward on the field is not beyond the mark, although Bassett was a near approach.") He scored in all of his first 10 international appearances, which remains a record for number of consecutive scoring appearances. He netted 19 times during these games, including 5 goals against Wales on 16 March 1896, winning three British Home Championships. He became England's all-time top goalscorer on 2 April 1898, when he surpassed Tinsley Lindley's total of 14 with two goals against Scotland. On 18 March 1901, he scored four goals against Wales, becoming the first player to score two hat-tricks for England and also the first to score four goals for England twice, as England once again won the British Home Championship. At the end of 1901, his goal tally stood at 25 in just 14 games. Bloomer played for England 11 times over the next 6 years, all in the British Home Championship, winning four more, bringing England's total to eight during his career, however he only scored 3 more goals during this period. He captained England once; against Scotland on 3 May 1902. He finished his international career in 1907 as England's longest serving player and England's all-time top goalscorer with 28 goals. He held the record until his tally was overhauled by Vivian Woodward in 1911.

During his international career, Bloomer's teammates included his County teammate John Goodall as well as Frank Becton, Billy Bassett, Jack Reynolds, Ernest Needham, Fred Spiksley, Sam Wolstenholme and Woodward.

== Prisoner in Germany ==
After retiring as a player, Bloomer went to Germany in July 1914 to coach Britannia Berlin 92. However, within three weeks of arriving, the First World War broke out. When Germany declared war on Russia, his contract was cancelled at once, and Herr Fauber, President of Britannia Berlin 92, advised Bloomer to get out of Germany as soon as possible, but he could not get out of the country. Britain declared war on Germany on 4 August 1914.

On 5 August 1914, Steve Bloomer, anxious to leave Germany, went to the British Consul office in Berlin. He was stopped by two gendarmes who questioned him, and his translator. Along with about a dozen others, he was marched through the streets of Berlin for about a quarter of a mile to the Alexander Platz, accompanied by a guard with revolvers and swords. At the Alexander Platz, he was questioned by magistrates with others, and arrested. Bloomer was given a slip of paper with his name and description, and told to report to the police at periodic intervals. On 6 November 1914, he was interned at Ruhleben, a civilian detention camp in the Spandau district of Berlin. According to the Derby Daily Telegraph, which relayed details in a letter written from Bloomer to his wife, he was arrested as a prisoner of war on 5 November 1914, although another source gives the date of his arrest as 6 November 1914. Bloomer was one of several former professional footballers among the detainees. Others included his former England colleague Sam Wolstenholme; his former Middlesbrough teammate Fred Pentland; a Scotland international, John Cameron; John Brearley, once of Everton and Tottenham Hotspur; and a German international, Edwin Dutton, who had previously played for Britannia Berlin 92.

The camp contained between 4,000 and 5,500 prisoners. Gradually, a mini-society evolved and football became a popular activity. The Ruhleben Football Association was formed and cup and league competitions were organised with as many as 1,000 attending the bigger games. The teams adopted the names of established teams and in November 1914, Bloomer captained a Tottenham Hotspur XI, that also included Dutton, to victory in a cup final against an Oldham Athletic XI. On 2 May 1915, an England XI featuring Pentland, Wolstenholme, Brearley and Bloomer played a World XI captained by Cameron. Bloomer also played cricket at the camp and in May 1915 a Rubleben XI, featuring Bloomer and Brearley, played a Varsities XI in the Rubleban Cricket League. In July 1916, a Lancashire XI, featuring Bloomer, beat a Yorkshire XI that included Wolstenholme.

In the summer, the prisoners turned to cricket on 'The Oval', played to packed houses. Bloomer established the camp batting record with an innings of 204 and recorded bowling figures of 6 for 15. There was athletics too. Bloomer won the 'Old Age Handicap' at the Ruhleben Olympics, sprinting the 75 yards in 9.6 seconds. Everybody in the camp knew 'Steve'. When he finally left Ruhleben in March 1918, a farewell football match was staged in his honour. Bloomer was released to neutral Holland, where he was employed as a coach of Blauw-Wit Amsterdam. He was not allowed to return home until the end of the war. Bloomer later said of his time in Ruhleben: "Myself and many others would not have survived without football."

== Coaching career ==
Immediately after World War I, Bloomer briefly coached Blauw-Wit Amsterdam in The Netherlands. He returned to England on 22 November 1918, and became player-coach of the Derby County reserve team, retiring from playing in January 1920. He was coach of the Derby first team in 1921. Between May and August 1922, he was in Montréal, Canada coaching the Grenadier Guards football team during their close season. He arrived back in England on 11 August 1922, and resumed his coaching duties with Derby County.

In 1923, he became coach of Real Unión in Spain and subsequently guided them to victory in the 1924 Copa del Rey. During the 1920s, the Copa was effectively a play-off to decide the Spanish champions. Teams qualified by winning their regional titles and Real Unión represented Guipuzcoa. Nine other regional champions also qualified and in the first round of the competition Real beat Sevilla, the champions of Andalusia, 3–1 on aggregate. In the semi-final, they faced the Catalan champions, Barcelona, coached by another Englishman, Jack Greenwell. Greenwell's squad included the likes of Paulino Alcántara, Sagibarba and Josep Samitier. Despite this, Real beat Barcelona 5–1 after a replay and went on to beat Real Madrid, the champions of central Spain, 1–0 in the final.

== Last years ==
After finishing coaching Real Union, Bloomer returned to England and to Derby where he worked the rest of his life as a groundsman and general assistant at the Baseball Ground. He died in Derby of bronchitis on 16 April 1938 aged 64.

== Baseball ==
On 13 May 1893, he played at first base for St. James's in a 17 - 34 defeat against Vulcan, at Derby. This was the first match of the 1893-1894 Derbyshire Baseball Association. The Vulcan team contained many members of the old Derby Baseball Club which had disbanded in 1890, but had reformed again later in that same year. On 10 June 1893, Steve Bloomer played for a Rest Of League team against Derby in a 22 - 26 defeat.

Bloomer then played baseball for Derby Baseball Club, making his debut for the team at the age of 20 on 5 May 1894, at the Baseball Ground in Derby. The Derby County goalkeeper, Jack Robinson also made his debut on the same day. (Note: "Jack Robinson and Steve Bloomer both assisted Derby, and bid fair to prove valuable acquisitions to the team.") Derby got to the semi-final of the English cup in 1894, and lost to the Thespians. The team won the English Baseball Cup on 17 August 1895 at Derby's Baseball Ground beating Fullers in the final, with Steve Bloomer playing at first base. They won 16 matches and lost just five in that season. The English Cup was won again by Derby in 1897, when they beat Middlesbrough in the final. The trophy was won for a third time by Derby, beating Nott'm Forest 14 - 3 in the final on 19 August 1899. Bloomer captained the team in the final and played at second base.

Derby County formed a baseball team in 1900 which Steve Bloomer played for in that season. Their first game was played on 19 May 1900. It contained, with Bloomer and among others, players who were or had been, members of Derby County football team up to that date: Enos Bromage, Hugh McQueen, Jonathan Staley, John Goodall, and Jimmy Methven. They played in a local league against Derby, Ilkeston, Belper, Chesterfield and Nottingham Forest. However, both Derby baseball teams do not appear to have existed after 1900.

== Legacy ==
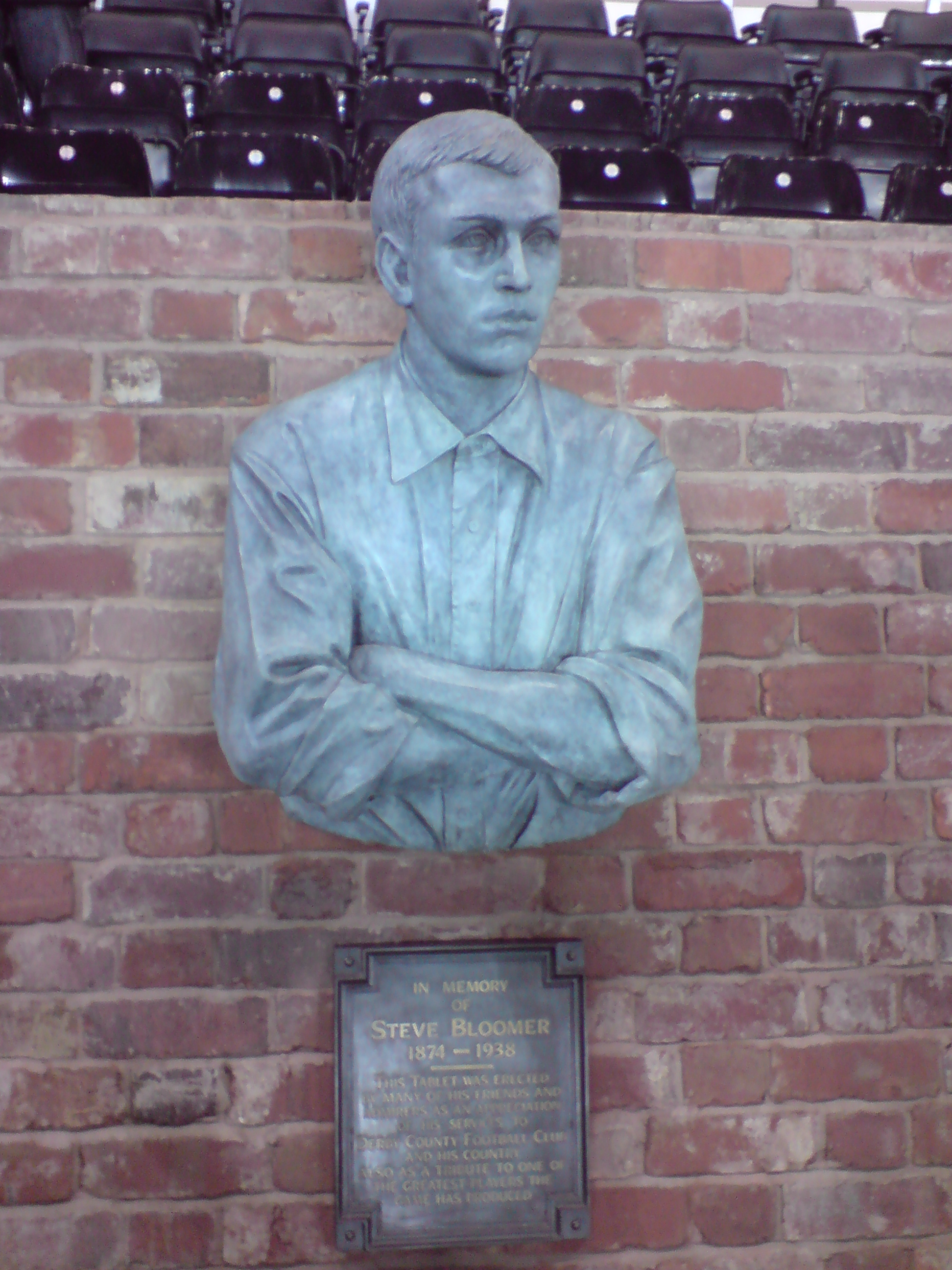
The bust of Bloomer at Pride Park

A plaque commemorating Bloomer's by-then demolished birthplace in Bridge Street, Cradley, was unveiled in 2000 by former Wolverhampton Wanderers and Derby player Jimmy Dunn and Bloomer's grandson Steve Richards.

On 17 January 2009, after a long and sustained period of campaigning, a bust of Bloomer was finally unveiled inside Pride Park, Derby. Bloomer's two grandsons, Steve Richards and Alan Quantrill, unveiled the bust in the presence of Bloomer's family and relations, the sculptor Andy Edwards and thousands of Derby County fans. On 17 January 2009, a bust of Bloomer was unveiled next to the home dugout at Pride Park Stadium. He remains a legend at Derby County and the club anthem, "Steve Bloomer's Watchin'", is played and sang before every home game. He is also listed in the Football League 100 Legends and English Football Hall of Fame.

Real Unión held a Steve Bloomer Day on 21 January 2017, to pay tribute to Bloomer. In recognition of his contribution to both clubs, Real Unión and Derby County met to contest the Steve Bloomer Trophy in a friendly match in Irun on 3 October 2017, in what is intended to become an annual fixture.

On 16 February 2018, a Blue plaque honouring Bloomer was unveiled on Bloomer's former school, in Portland Street, Derby, by the Derby Civic Society, in the presence of the Mayor of Derby, councillor John Whitby. It reads:

Steve Bloomer

1874-1938
Footballer
Played for Derby County FC (1892-1914) and capped 23 times for his Country

Brought up in Portland Street, he received his earliest education in this building

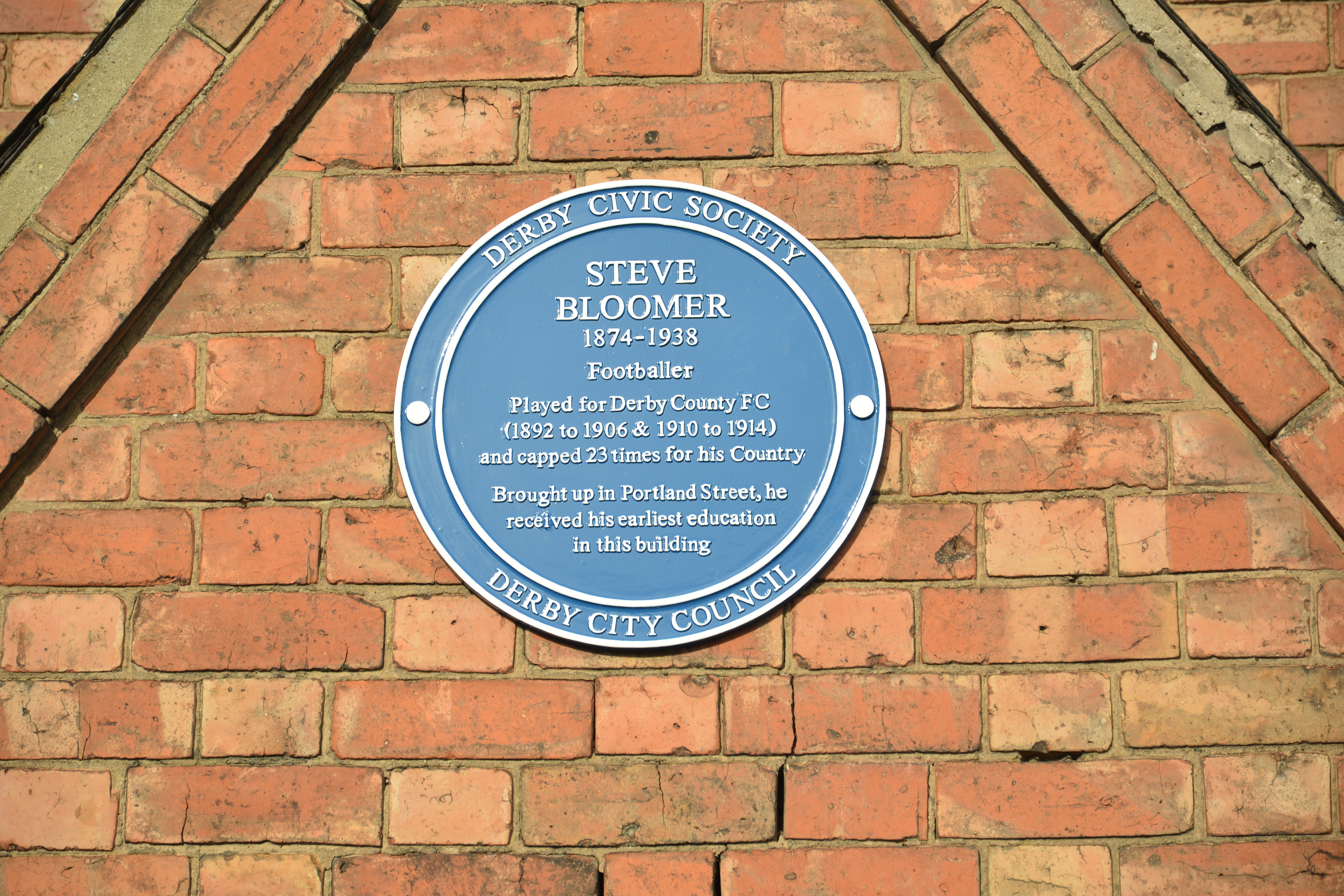
Blue Plaque commemorating the life of Steve Bloomer in Derby, sited on the corner of Peartree Street and Portland Street.

== Career statistics ==
=== Club ===
Appearances and goals by club, season and competition
Club	Season	League			FA Cup		Other		Total	
Club	Season	Division	Apps	Goals	Apps	Goals	Apps	Goals	Apps	Goals
Derby County	1892–93	First Division	28	11	–	–	–		28	11
Derby County	1893–94	First Division	25	19	2	0	–		27	19
Derby County	1894–95	First Division	29	10	1	0	1 (Note: One appearance and one goal in a League Test match)	1	31	11
Derby County	1895–96	First Division	25	22	5	5	–		30	27
Derby County	1896–97	First Division	29	24	4	7	–		33	31
Derby County	1897–98	First Division	23	15	3	5	–		26	20
Derby County	1898–99	First Division	28	24	5	6	–		33	30
Derby County	1899–1900	First Division	28	19	2	0	–		30	19
Derby County	1900–01	First Division	27	24	1	0	–		28	24
Derby County	1901–02	First Division	29	15	7	3	–		36	18
Derby County	1902–03	First Division	24	12	2	1	–		26	13
Derby County	1903–04	First Division	29	20	6	5	–		35	25
Derby County	1904–05	First Division	29	13	1	0	–		30	13
Derby County	1905–06	First Division	23	12	3	0	–		26	12
Derby County	Total		376	240	42	32	1	1	419	273
Middlesbrough	1905–06	First Division	9	6	–	–	–		9	6
Middlesbrough	1906–07	First Division	34	18	2	2	–		36	20
Middlesbrough	1907–08	First Division	34	12	1	0	–		35	14
Middlesbrough	1908–09	First Division	28	14	–	–	–		28	14
Middlesbrough	1909–10	First Division	20	9	2	1	–		22	10
Middlesbrough	Total		125	59	5	1	0	0	130	60
Derby County	1910–11	Second Division	28	20	4	4	–		32	24
Derby County	1911–12	Second Division	36	18	2	1	–		38	19
Derby County	1912–13	First Division	29	13	1	1	–		30	14
Derby County	1913–14	First Division	5	2	1	0	–		6	2
Derby County	Total		98	53	8	6	0	0	106	59
Career total			599	352	55	39	1	1	655	392

=== International ===
Appearances and goals by national team and year
National team	Year	Apps	Goals
England	1895	2	3
England	1896	2	6
England	1897	3	4
England	1898	1	2
England	1899	3	4
England	1900	1	1
England	1901	2	5
England	1902	3	0
England	1904	1	1
England	1905	3	1
England	1907	2	1
Total		23	28

== Honours ==
=== Player ===
Derby County

- Second Division: 1911–12
- FA Cup runner-up: 1897–98, 1898–99, 1902–03

England

- British Home Championship: 1895, 1898, 1899, 1901, 1903, 1904, 1905

Individual

- English Top Division Golden Boot: 1895–96, 1896–97, 1898–99, 1900–01, 1903–04
- Football League 100 Legends: 1998 (inducted)
- English Football Hall of Fame: 2007 (inducted)

=== Manager ===
Real Unión

- Copa del Rey: 1924

== See also ==
- List of English football first tier top scorers
- List of men's footballers with 500 or more goals

== Notes ==
=== Bibliography ===
- Seddon, Peter (1999). Steve Bloomer: The Story of Football's First Superstar. Breedon Books (Derby). ISBN 1-85983-146X.
