= Fred Pentland =

English footballer (1883–1962)

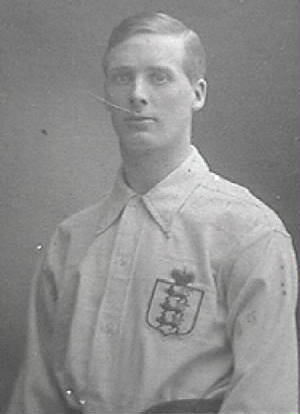
- Pentland in 1909

Personal information
- Full name: Frederick Beaconsfield Pentland
- Date of birth: 29 July 1883
- Place of birth: Wolverhampton, England
- Date of death: 16 March 1962 (aged 78)
- Place of death: Lytchett Matravers, England
- Position: Outside right

Youth career
- 1898–1899: Avondale Juniors
- 1899–1900: Willenhall Swifts

Senior career*
Years	Team	Apps	(Gls)
1900–1903	Small Heath	0	(0)
1903	Blackpool	8	(5)
1903–1906	Blackburn Rovers	51	(9)
1906–1907	Brentford	36	(12)
1907–1908	Queens Park Rangers	37	(14)
1908–1912	Middlesbrough	92	(11)
1912–1913	Halifax Town		
1913	Stoke	12	(6)
1913–1914	Halifax Town		
Total		200	(45)

International career
1909	England	5	(0)

Managerial career
- 1914: Germany Olympic
- 1919: AS Strasbourg
- 1920: France Olympic
- 1920–1921: Racing de Santander
- 1922–1925: Athletic Club de Bilbao
- 1925–1926: Atlético Madrid
- 1926–1927: Real Oviedo
- 1927–1929: Atlético Madrid
- 1929–1933: Athletic Club de Bilbao
- 1934–1935: Atlético Madrid
- 1938–1940: Barrow
- * Club domestic league appearances and goals

Frederick Beaconsfield Pentland (29 July 1883 – 16 March 1962) was an English football player and coach.

Pentland played club football in the Football League for Blackpool, Blackburn Rovers and Middlesbrough, in the Southern Football League for Brentford, Queens Park Rangers and Stoke, and in the Midland League for Halifax Town. He was capped five times for England in 1909. He played as a forward, mainly at outside right.

As a manager, he took charge of the German Olympic football team, the France national team, and Spanish club sides Racing de Santander, Athletic Club de Bilbao, Atlético Madrid and Real Oviedo, before returning to England where he briefly managed Barrow.

== Playing career ==
Pentland began his football career with Avondale Juniors and Willenhall Swifts before joining Football League Second Division club Small Heath in August 1900 at the age of 17. He played for Small Heath's reserves in the Birmingham & District League, but made no senior league appearances, and after the club's promotion to the First Division at the end of the 1900–01 season, it became more difficult to break through. His only senior appearance was in a 2–1 defeat at Portsmouth in the 1901–02 FA Cup, playing at inside forward in a team weakened by injuries, and in 1903 he signed for Blackpool.

Blackpool used him at centre forward: he scored his first senior goal on 26 September, at home to Stockport County, completed a run of five goals in four matches with a double in a 4–1 win away to Burnley on 17 October, and eleven days later, signed for First Division Blackburn Rovers in a deal reported as "a good bargain" for Blackpool. Over the next two and a half seasons, Pentland contributed 9 goals from 51 league appearances as Blackburn twice finished near the foot of the division and once climbed to mid-table. In 1906, the club listed him for transfer at a fee of £250. There were no takers from the Football League, so he moved into the Southern League, initially with Brentford. He had been so popular at Blackburn that a "crowd of players and friends", accompanied by the Palace Theatre band, saw him off at the station with renditions of "For He's a Jolly Good Fellow" and "Auld Lang Syne".

He missed only two league matches and contributed twelve goals as Brentford finished in mid-table, but was not retained. He remained in west London with another Southern League club, Queens Park Rangers, who had ended the previous season eight places below Brentford. Under the management of James Cowan, QPR won the 1907–08 title. Playing at outside right, Pentland scored 14 goals from 37 Southern League matches, and was selected for The South to face The North in an international trial. Although his performance in the trial did not earn him selection for his country, he was first reserve at outside right for that season's internationals. As Southern League winners, Queens Park Rangers faced the Football League champions, in this case Manchester United, in a match for the new Football Association Charity Shield. Pentland played, and the match was drawn. It was replayed in August, by which time Pentland had left QPR; although he was reportedly keen to play, and the Football Association granted special dispensation for his inclusion, QPR's directors did not select him because, according to the Kilburn Times, he had been insistent on leaving the club despite being offered the maximum salary.

In June 1908, Pentland returned to the First Division with Middlesbrough, who had to pay fees to both clubs with an interest in the player: £350 to Queens Park Rangers and £150 to Blackburn Rovers. Playing with such teammates as Alf Common and Steve Bloomer, he helped Middlesbrough finish ninth in his first season, and in 1909, was rewarded with his first cap for England. He played at outside right, alongside captain Vivian Woodward, as England beat Wales and Scotland to complete victory in the 1908–09 British Home Championship. He won three more caps, on a tour of central Europe that same year. In the next two seasons, Pentland continued to play regularly, although Middlesbrough were less successful, and in 1911 he spent some time suspended by the club for "neglecting his training". He made only one first-team appearance in 1911–12, to take his totals to 11 goals from 96 appearances in all senior competition.

In August 1912 he joined Halifax Town, newly admitted to the Midland League. He scored freely, finishing the season as the club's top scorer, as well as acting as player-manager, and helped Halifax reach the first round proper of the 1912–13 FA Cup. With the club in straitened financial circumstances, he was sold to Southern League Stoke in February for a substantial fee. He remained with Stoke until December of that year, contributing six league goals in twelve appearances, before returning to Halifax where his career ended a few months later through injury.

== Prisoner in Germany ==
After retiring as a player, Pentland went to Berlin in 1914 to take charge of the German Olympic football team. However within a few months, the First World War broke out and he was subsequently interned at Ruhleben, a civilian detention camp in the Spandau district of Berlin. The camp contained between 4,000 and 5,500 prisoners. Gradually a mini-society evolved and football became a popular activity. Cup and league competitions were organised and as many as 1,000 attended the bigger games. Pentland was prominent in organising and playing football within the camp. He was chairman of the Ruhleben Football Association and regularly contributed to football articles in the camp magazine.

Pentland was one of several former professional footballers at Ruhleben. Others included former club teammates and fellow England internationals, Samuel Wolstenholme and Steve Bloomer, a Scotland international, John Cameron, a German international Edwin Dutton, and John Brearley, once of Everton and Tottenham Hotspur. On 2 May 1915 an England XI featuring Pentland, Wolstenholme, Brearley and Bloomer played a World XI captained by Cameron. Towards the end of the war an international triangular tournament called the Coupe de Allies, featuring a British XI, a French XI and a Belgium XI, was organised. Pentland remained in the camp until the end of the war and then returned to England. During his recuperation, he met Nahneen Hayes, a war widow working as a nurse with a Voluntary Aid Detachment (VAD); the couple married in 1923.

== Olympic Games with France ==
In 1919, rebuilt AS Strasbourg, formerly Straßburger FV, appointed Pentland as manager-coach. In 1920 Pentland coached France at the Olympic Games. France received a bye to the quarter-final stages where they beat Italy 3–1. However, in the semi-finals they lost 4–1 to Czechoslovakia. The final stages of the tournament descended into farce and France missed out on the opportunity to win the silver medal. The host nation, Belgium won the gold medal by default after Czechoslovakia walked off in protest during the final, unhappy with the performance of the referee and the conditions surrounding the match. As a result, they were disqualified and a second consolation tournament was organised to decide the silver and bronze medallists. However France and Pentland, presuming the competition was over, had already returned home and Spain eventually won the silver medal.

== Manager in Spain ==
In 1920 Pentland joined Racing de Santander but after one season he was hired by Athletic Club de Bilbao. He revolutionised the way Athletic Club played, favouring the short-passing game, and in 1923 he led the club to victory in the Copa del Rey. However, in 1925 he left Athletic and went on to coach Athletic Madrid, leading them to the Copa final in 1926. He spent the next season with Real Oviedo, In 1927 he returned to Athletic Madrid and was manager during the inaugural La Liga season. In May 1929 he helped coach the Spain national team, under manager José María Mateos, when they beat England 4–3 at Athletic Madrid's Metropolitano Stadium. As a result, Spain became the first non-British team to beat England.

In 1929 Pentland rejoined Athletic Club de Bilbao. He subsequently led them to La Liga–Copa del Rey "doubles" in 1930 and 1931. He also guided the club as they won the Copa four times in a row between 1930 and 1933 and finished as La Liga runners-up in 1932 and 1933. In 1931 he also masterminded Athletic's 12–1 victory over Barcelona, the latter's worst ever defeat. He was known in Bilbao for his "trademark" cigar and bowler hat.

In 1933 he joined Athletic Madrid for a third time but returned to England at the outbreak of the Spanish Civil War.

== Career statistics ==
=== Club ===
Appearances and goals by club, season and competition
Club	Season	League			FA Cup		Total	
Club	Season	Division	Apps	Goals	Apps	Goals	Apps	Goals
Small Heath	1901–02	First Division	0	0	1	0	1	0
Blackpool	1903–04	Second Division	8	5	0	0	8	5
Blackburn Rovers	1903–04	First Division	18	7	0	0	18	7
Blackburn Rovers	1904–05	First Division	27	1	1	0	28	1
Blackburn Rovers	1905–06	First Division	6	1	0	0	6	1
Blackburn Rovers	Total		51	9	1	0	52	9
Middlesbrough	1908–09	First Division	28	2	1	0	30	2
Middlesbrough	1909–10	First Division	33	2	1	0	34	2
Middlesbrough	1910–11	First Division	30	7	2	0	32	7
Middlesbrough	1911–12	First Division	1	0	0	0	1	0
Middlesbrough	Total		92	11	4	0	96	11
Stoke	1912–13	Southern League Division One	5	1	0	0	5	1
Stoke	1913–14	Southern League Division Two	7	5	0	0	7	5
Stoke	Total		12	6	0	0	12	6
Career Total			163	31	6	0	169	31

=== International ===
Appearances and goals by national team and year
National team	Year	Apps	Goals
England	1909	5	0
Total		5	0

== Honours ==
Athletic Bilbao

- La Liga: 1929–30, 1930–31
- Copa del Rey: 1923, 1930, 1931, 1932, 1933

Atlético Madrid

- Copa del Rey runner-up: 1926
