= Edwin Dutton =

German footballer and manager (1890–1970)

Personal information
- Date of birth: 8 April 1890
- Place of birth: Mittelwalde, Silesia
- Date of death: 24 May 1972 (aged 82)
- Place of death: Wilmslow, England
- Position: Forward

Senior career*
Years	Team	Apps	(Gls)
- Britannia Berlin 92
1909–19xx	BFC Preussen		
1910-1913	Newcastle United		
1913–19xx	Britannia 92		

International career
1909	Germany	1	(0)

Managerial career
- 1917–1918: AFC
- 1924–1926: Stuttgarter Kickers
- 1927–1928: Ipswich Town (coach)
- * Club domestic league appearances and goals

Edwin Dutton (8 April 1890 – 24 May 1972) was an Anglo-German footballer and coach. Dutton played as a forward for Britannia Berlin 92, BFC Preussen, Newcastle United and Germany. During the First World War he was interned at Ruhleben, a civilian detention camp in Germany. During the 1920s he managed Stuttgarter Kickers and became the first professional trainer at Ipswich Town.

== Birthplace ==
Dutton's parents migrated from England to Germany where his father, Thomas Edwin Dutton, became a sporting pioneer, helping introduce football and cricket to Berlin and Wrocław. As a result, there is some confusion over where Edwin was actually born. Conflicting sources have claimed South Shields in Tyne and Wear or Mittelwalde in Germany. This town is now known as Międzylesie and is in modern Poland. Others have given his birthplace as Berlin.

== Playing career ==
Dutton went to school in Berlin and played as right-winger for Britannia Berlin 92 and BFC Preussen. In 1909–10 he played for BFC Preussen against Holstein Kiel, in a quarter-final of the German championship. While playing for BFC Preussen, Dutton also played one game for Germany, a 3–3 draw with Hungary on 4 April 1909. The game was refereed by Hugo Meisl. Later on, Dutton was with Newcastle United for a while but then returned to Berlin, rejoining his first club, Britannia 92. He became eligible to play in league and cup matches as from January 1913 following longish discussions concerning his amateur status. In February that same year, he played for Berlin against Paris.

== Prisoner in Germany ==
When the First World War began, Dutton was resident at Blücherstraße 42 in Berlin and was working as a sports outfitter. He was arrested in Berlin on 6 November 1914, and sent to Ruhleben, a civilian detention camp in the Spandau district. While there he was interned in Barrack 1. The camp contained between 4,000 and 5,500 prisoners. Gradually a mini-society evolved and football became a popular activity. Dutton was one of several former professional footballers at Ruhleben. Others included former England internationals Fred Pentland, Samuel Wolstenholme and Steve Bloomer, John Cameron, a former Scotland international and John Brearley, a former Everton and Tottenham player.

The Ruhleben Football Association organised cup and league competitions and as many as 1,000 attended the bigger games. The teams adopted the names of established teams and in November 1914 Dutton played in a cup final as an outside left for a Tottenham Hotspur team that also featured Bloomer. Their opponents were an Oldham Athletic team. The Tottenham team won the game which was refereed by Wolstenholme. Dutton also occasionally played cricket at Ruhleben.
