= Altmann (surname) =

Altmann is a surname. Notable people with the surname include:

- Alexander Altmann (1906–1987), Orthodox Jewish scholar
- Andreas Altmann (born 1963), Austrian economist
- Anton Altmann (1808–1871), Austrian painter
- Barbara K. Altmann (born 1957), Canadian academic and college administrator
- Bernhard Altmann (1888–1960), Austro-Hungarian socialite
- Danny Altmann, British immunologist
- Denise Altmann (born 1987), Austrian ice hockey forward
- Dora Altmann (1881–1971), German actress
- Elisabeth Altmann-Gottheiner (1874–1930), first female German university lecturer
- Elke Altmann (born 1957), German politician
- Eva Altmann (1903–1991), German economist
- Gabriel Altmann (1931–2020), Slovak-German linguist and mathematician
- Jeanne Altmann (born 1940), American primatologist
- Jens Altmann (born 1968), German Paralympic volleyball player
- John Altmann (1916–1983), Australian rules footballer
- Karl Altmann (painter) (1802–1861), German painter
- Karl Altmann (politician) (1904–1960), Austrian politician
- Kelly Altmann (born 1993), Australian netball player
- Klaus Altmann, alias of war criminal Klaus Barbie
- Livia Altmann (born 1994), Swiss ice hockey player
- Madeleine Altmann (born 1963), Contemporary video artist
- Margaret Altmann (1900–1984), German-American biologist
- Maria Altmann (1916–2011), Austrian-American Jewish refugee
- Mario Altmann (born 1986), Austrian ice hockey player
- Mark Altmann, Australian Paralympic swimmer
- Olaf Altmann (born 1966), German scenic designer and theatre director
- Richard Altmann (1852–1900), German pathologist
- Ros Altmann (born 1956), British pensions campaigner
- Virgilius Altmann (1913–1943), Austrian cyclist
- Wilhelm Altmann (1862–1951), German historian and musicologist
- Wolfgang Altmann (born 1952), German footballer

== See also ==
- Altman (surname)
