= Altmann =

Altmann may refer to:

- Altmann (surname)
- Altmann (mountain), a summit of the Appenzell Alps
- Altmann of Passau, bishop (1020–1091)
- Altmann (1905 automobile), an early German automobile
- Republic of Austria v. Altmann, a decision by the US Supreme Court

== See also ==
- Altman (disambiguation)
- Oldman (disambiguation)
- Jungmann
- Jungman
