= Elke =

- Pronunciation: Elke: German: [ˈɛlkə], English: /ˈɛlkə/ Elka: German: [ˈɛlka], English: /ˈɛlkə/ Elkie: English: /ˈɛlki/ Alke: German: [ˈalkə]
- Gender: Female
- Language: Low German and East Frisian, Yiddish

Origin
- Meaning: "of noble birth"

Other names
- Related names: Adelheid, Elkan, Elkanah, Elkie, Elka and Alke
- Popularity: see popular names

Elke (see panel for pronunciation) is a feminine given name. Different sources give different accounts of its origin. One source describes it as a Low German and East Frisian diminutive of Adelheid, meaning "of noble birth". Another states that it originated as a Yiddish feminine variant of Elkan, which itself came from the Biblical name Elkanah.

In English-speaking countries, the variant Elkie was popularised by the singer Elkie Brooks. Other German variants of the name include Elka and Alke.

In the United States, the 1990 census found that Elke was the 2,588th most common given name for women, being held by about 0.002% of the female population at the time, while the other variants Elkie, Elka, and Alke were not among the names held by at least 0.001% of the female population (the most common 4,275 names).

== People ==
=== Elke ===
- Elke Aberle (born 1950), German actress
- Elke Altmann (born 1957), German politician
- Elke Clijsters (born 1985), Belgian table tennis player
- Elke Drüll (born 1956), German field hockey player
- Elke Felten (born 1943), German sprint canoeist
- Elke Gebhardt (born 1983), German racing cyclist
- Elke Van Gorp (born 1995), Belgian football player
- Elke Gryglewski (born 1965), German political scientist and historian
- Elke Hanel-Torsch (born 1981), Austrian politician
- Elke Heidenreich (born 1943), German journalist
- Elke Hipler (born 1978), German rower
- Elke Hoff (born 1957), German politician
- Elke-Karin Morciniec (born 1943), Polish equestrian
- Elke Karsten (born 1995), Argentine handball player
- Elke König (born 1954), German financial regulator
- Elke Krystufek (born 1970), Austrian artist
- Elke Mackenzie (1911-1990), British polar explorer and botanist
- Elke Maravilha (1945–2016), German-born Brazilian actress
- Elke Neidhardt (1941–2013), German-born Australian actress
- Elke Philipp (born 1964), German Paralympic equestrian
- Elke Radlingsmaier (born 1943), German fencer
- Elke Rehder (born 1953), German artist
- Elke Roex (born 1974), Belgian politician
- Elke Schall (born 1973), German table tennis player
- Elke Schmitter (born 1961), German journalist and author
- Elke Sehmisch (born 1955), German swimmer
- Elke Slagt-Tichelman (born 1977), Dutch politician
- Elke Sleurs (born 1968), Belgian politician
- Elke Sommer (born 1940), German actress
- Elke Reva Sudin (born 1987), American artist
- Elke Talma (born 1977), Seychellois swimmer
- Elke Tindemans (born 1961), Belgian politician
- Elke Tsang Kai-mong (1964–1994), Hong Kong drug trafficker
- Elke Twesten (born 1963), German politician
- Elke Vanhoof (born 1991), Belgian BMX rider
- Elke Voelker (born 1968), German organist
- Elke U. Weber, American business professor
- Elke Winkens (born 1970), German and Austrian actress
- Elke Wölfling (born 1971), Austrian hurdler

=== Elka ===
- Elka Graham (born 1981), Australian swimmer
- Elka de Levie (1905–1979), Dutch gymnast
- Elka Nikolova, Bulgarian-born American film director
- Elka Todorova (born 1956), Bulgarian sociologist and psychologist
- Elka Wardega, Australian makeup artist

=== Elkie ===
- Elkie Brooks (born Elaine Bookbinder, 1945), English singer
- Elkie Chong (born Chong Ting-yan, 1998), Hong Kong singer

== Fictional characters ==
- Elke Haien, the wife of the main character in the 1888 German novel The Rider on the White Horse by Theodor Storm
- Elka Ostrovsky, from the 2010–2015 American television show Hot in Cleveland
- Fräulein Elke, a travesti performer from the 1972 film Cabaret
