= Altman (surname) =

Altman is a surname. Notable people with the surname include:

- Albert L. Altman (1853–1903), Irish entrepreneur
- Aryeh Altman (1902–1982), Israeli politician
- Arthur Altman (1910–1994), American composer and violinist
- Benjamin Altman (1840–1913), American retailer, founder of B. Altman & Co. and art collector
- Bruce Altman (born 1955), American actor
- Dana Altman (born 1958), American basketball coach
- David R. Altman (1915–2000), American advertising executive
- Dennis Altman (born 1943), Australian academic and pioneering gay rights activist
- Doug Altman (1948–2018), English statistician
- Edith Altman (1931–2020), German-American artist
- Edward I. Altman, (born 1941), American economist and professor of finance, creator of Altman Z-score bankruptcy prediction model
- Emily Altman, American television writer
- George Altman (born 1933), American professional baseball player
- Georges Altman (1901–1960), French journalist and resistance fighter
- Hannah Altman (born 1995), American photographer
- Ida Altman (born 1950), American historian
- Jeff Altman (born 1951), American comedian
- John Altman (disambiguation), several people
- Joseph Altman (1925–2016), American neuroscientist and biologist who discovered adult neurogenesis in the 1960s
- Jurate Kristina Kazickas-Altman (born 1943), Lithuanian American journalist
- Koby Altman (born 1982/1983), American basketball executive
- Kyle Altman (born 1986), American soccer player
- Mark A. Altman, American writer, producer and actor
- Marshall Altman, American composer
- Michael J. Altman, American scholar of religion
- Mike Altman (born 1975), American rower
- Mike Altman (lyricist) (born 1955), American songwriter
- Mitch Altman (born 1956), American hacker and inventor
- Moyshe Altman (1890–1981), Russian Yiddish writer
- Naomi Altman, Canadian-American statistician
- Nathan Altman (1889–1970), Russian painter
- Phyllis Altman (1919–1999), South African trade unionist and anti-apartheid activist
- Ray H. Altman (born 1943), American politician from Kentucky
- Rick Altman (born 1945), American film scholar
- Robert Altman (1925–2006), American film director, producer and screenwriter
- Robert Altman (1944–2021), American photographer
- Robert A. Altman (1947–2021), American lawyer involved in Bank of Credit and Commerce International scandal
- Roger Altman (born 1946), American politician and banker
- Roy Altman (born 1982), judge of the U.S. District Court for the Southern District of Florida, lawyer, and author
- Sam Altman (born 1985), American entrepreneur, investor, programmer; president of Y Combinator, chief executive of OpenAI
- Scott Altman (born 1959), American astronaut
- Sean Altman (born 1961), American musician and songwriter (Rockapella)
- Semen Altman (born 1946), Ukrainian football coach
- Shelly Altman, American television writer
- Sidney Altman (1939–2022), Canadian biologist
- Stuart Altman (born 1937), American health-care economist
- Tosia Altman (1918–1943), Polish Jewish resistance fighter

== See also ==
- Altmann (surname)
