= Karl Altmann =

Karl Altmann may refer to:

- Karl Altmann (painter)
- Karl Altmann (politician)
