= Jungman =

Jungman is a surname. Notable people with the surname include:

- Ann Jungman (born 1938), author of children's literature
- Phillip Jungman (born 1995), American sport shooter
- Teresa Jungman (1907–2010), birth name of Teresa Cuthbertson, British socialite
- Zita Jungman (1903–2006), birth name of Zita James, British socialite, sister of Teresa

== See also ==
- Jungman language
- Jungmann
- Altmann (surname)
