= Altman =

Altman may refer to:

- Altman (surname)
- Altman (automobile), Ohio-based manufacturer
- Altman (film), a 2014 documentary film about film director Robert Altman
- Altman, Colorado, a ghost town
- Altman, West Virginia

== See also ==
- Altmann (disambiguation)
