= Internationales Studentenhaus Innsbruck =

Student accommodation company in Innsbruck, Austria

Coordinates: 47°15′43″N 11°22′58″E

Internationales Studentenhaus gem. GmbH
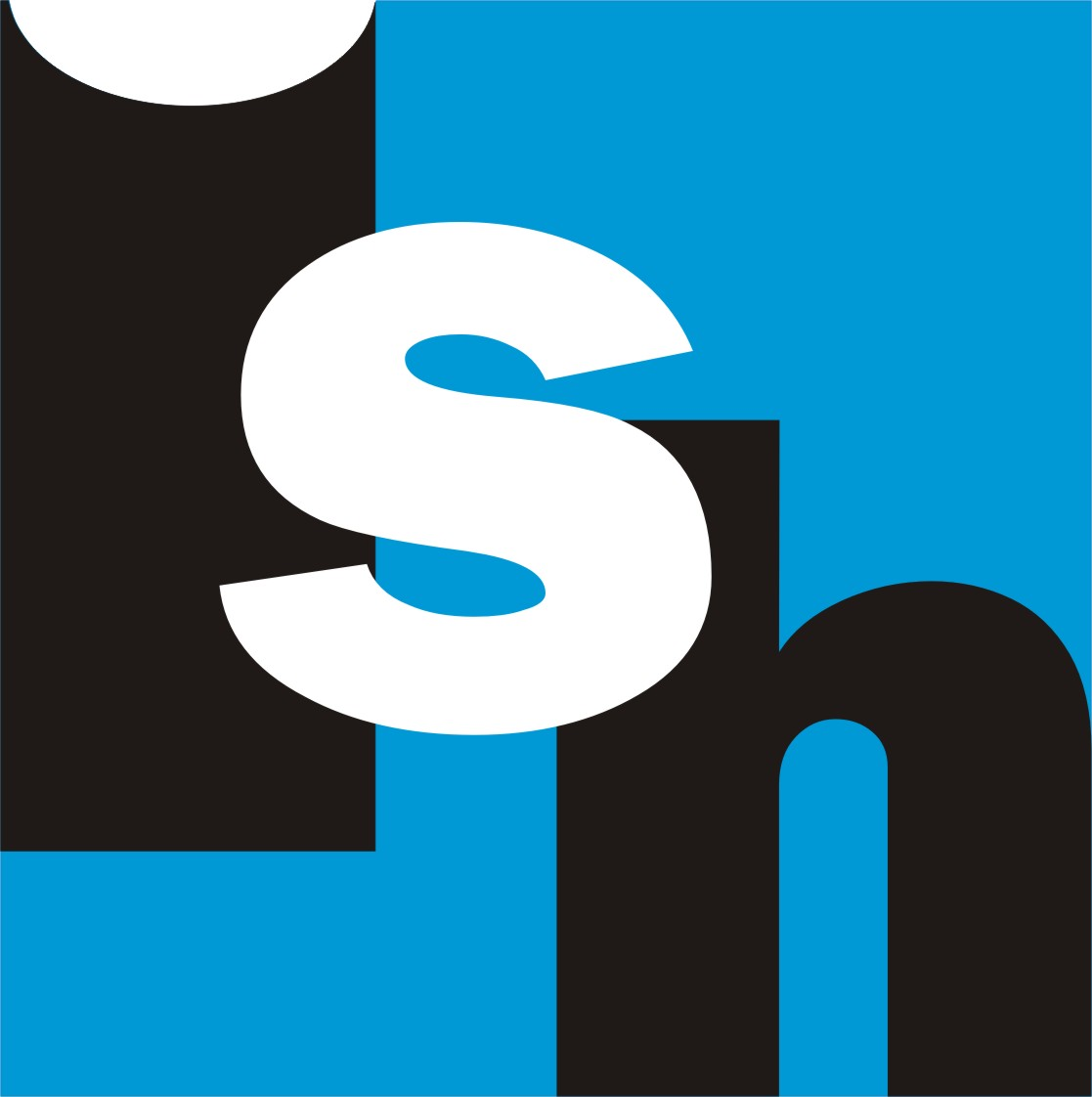
- Type: Limited liability company (Gesellschaft mit beschränkter Haftung)
- Industry: Education - Student accommodation
- Founded: 15. February 1952
- Headquarters: Innsbruck
- Key people: Mag. Huberta Scheiber, CEO
- Number of employees: 35 (October 2011)
- Website: www.studentenhaus.at

Internationales Studentenhaus (ISH) is a non-profiit student accommodation company in Innsbruck, Austria. The company that built and owns the residences was founded in 1952.

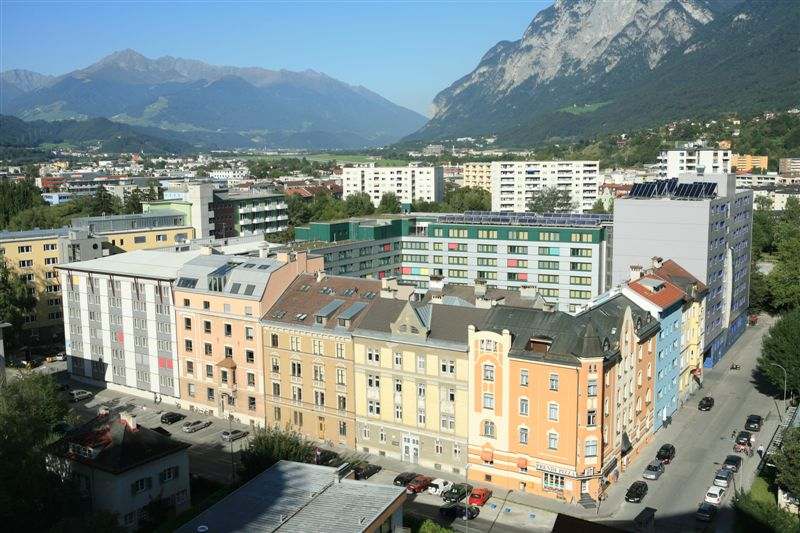
Overview of the buildings of ISH

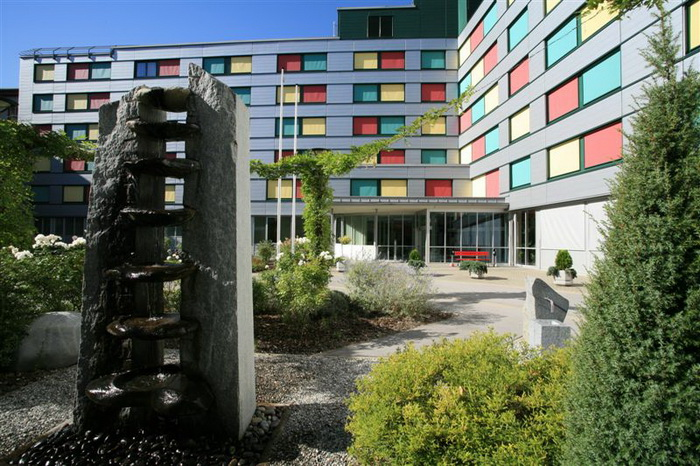
Courtyard

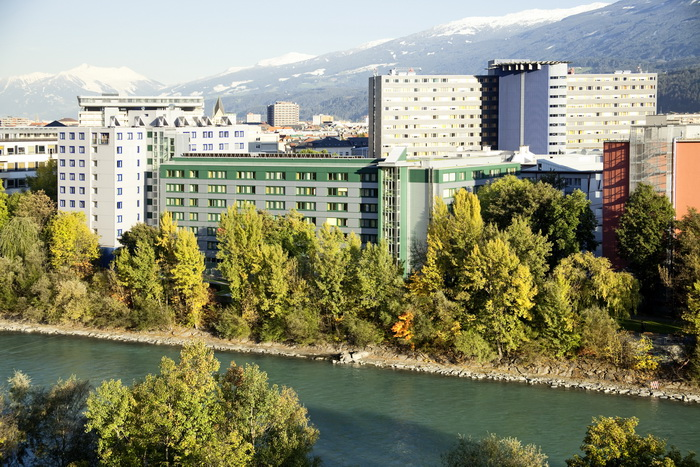
ISH, in front the Inn

== Introduction ==
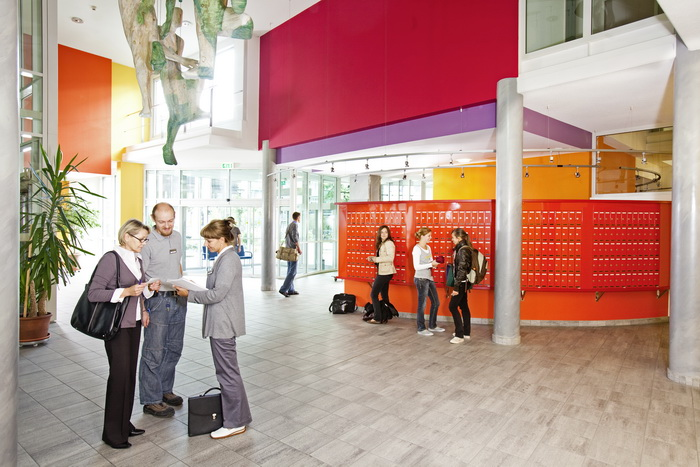
Foyer

ISH provides accommodation to 670 students enrolled in universities or colleges located in Innsbruck and its surroundings. From its founding, ISH has developed an international orientation, and in some instances more than a dozen different nationalities have been represented in its accommodation, though the major demographic comes from Austria and the neighbouring countries.

All accommodation units have a bath or shower with toilet and a kitchen. The main building also contains a number of communal areas and rooms for leisure activities. The main building is located at Rechengasse 7. The annexes are located at Rechengasse 1, Rechengasse 3 and Hormayrstrasse 12.

=== Location ===
ISH occupies a central location, with downtown Innsbruck and the historical Old Town in walking distance and direct access to the promenade with cycle paths also on the banks of the River Inn. There is one bus stop opposite ISH and a tram and bus interchange about 500 m away.

=== Universities ===
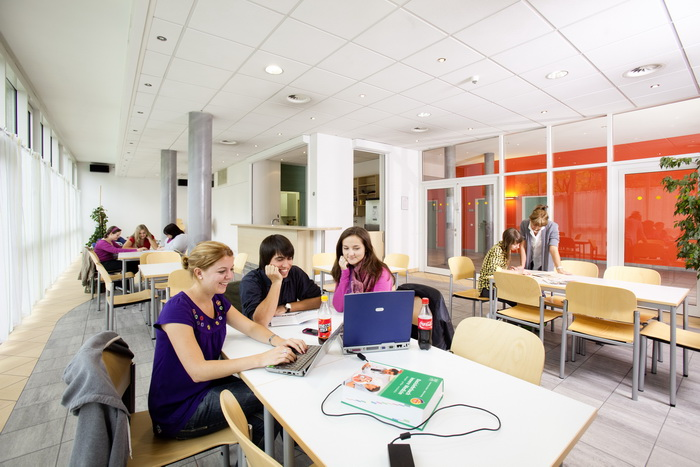
Studyroom

Most institutions of further education in Innsbruck and its surroundings are located in close proximity to an ISH accommodation. The main building of Innsbruck University, with its Law and Humanities Faculties and some of the departments of the Natural Science Faculty are located next to ISH. And it is less than a five minutes’ walk to the Medical University, the new Chemistry and Pharmacy building, the University and Regional Library of Tyrol and Training Centre West (AZW) with its university of applied science programmes in healthcare (FH Gesundheit Tirol).

Within a fifteen minutes radius (on foot) lie the Faculty of Social and Economic Sciences, the Catholic Theological Faculty, the Department of Botany and Management Center Innsbruck (MCI). And it is just a bus or tram ride to the Technical Faculty, the Department of Biology, the University Sports Institute (USI), the Tyrol College of Education (PHT), the Tourism College, the Media College and the Health and Life Sciences University (UMIT) in Hall in Tirol.

=== The company ===
ISH is run by Internationales Studentenhaus gemeinnützige GmbH. The company is owned by the Austrian federal authority with a 25 percent shareholding, and by the Tyrolean regional and Innsbruck municipal authorities, the regional authorities of Vorarlberg, Salzburg and Upper Austria, and the Tyrolean Chamber of Commerce, which each hold a one-eighth share in the company. Another partner is the German Friends of Innsbruck Universities Association in Munich, which holds a one-thousandth share in the company.

== History ==
=== Student accommodation problems in the 1930s ===
In the 1930s, it was very difficult for students to find accommodation in Innsbruck, with a growing student body on the one hand and a general shortage of rooms on the other. There was a student hostel adjoining the university, with one hundred beds that were seen as small, and the building had no social space for students to interact. In 1931, University Rector August Haffner found clear words to describe the problem: “The student hostel is merely a provisional timber-framed building with a useful life that cannot be expected to exceed another ten years.”

With the outbreak of the 2nd World War, however, plans for the construction of a new student hostel had to be shelved. The problem of accommodation for students was exacerbated by bomb damage suffered during the war, and the situation deteriorated further in the second half of the 1940s when Innsbruck developed into a major university city attracting more and more students from home and abroad. The city also became increasingly popular with tourists, which made it increasingly attractive to let rooms to wealthy tourists rather than students.

=== Plans and delays ===
University Rectors Hugo Rahner and Gustav Sauser were prominent figures in provoking the improvement of the accommodation situation for students. Yet, it was not until their successor, Eduard Reut-Nicolussi, was in office that the plans were finally implemented. On 15 February 1952 “Internationales Studentenhaus” was established on a non-profit basis and in July of the same year was officially recognised by the Tyrolean Regional Government as a non-profit housing organisation.

By 1955 the company had raised the capital needed to construct the first building. But, the planned location on a plot of land between the university and Blasius-Hueber-Strasse was no longer available as the Tyrolean Office of Public Works chose to reserve the site for future extensions to the university itself. As an alternative, a plot of land in Rechengasse was proposed and accepted. Work on the six-storey building proved difficult due to the poor load-bearing capacity of the foundation soil and the need to excavate the clay and mud strata to remove the remains of a rack from the days of river logging operations. That led to a cost overrun and further delays before the building could be completed.

=== Extensions and renovations from 1958 to 1998 ===
In 1958 the first students moved into their rooms at ISH. Demand was high, and up to a thousand applications for accommodation had to be rejected in the following years. In 1959 plans were therefore drawn up for an additional tract, which was constructed with great urgency starting in 1961. In December 1963 the whole ISH complex, with the capacity to house 468 students, was inaugurated and – thanks above all to the generosity of Max Kade, a German-born US businessman in the chemical and pharmaceutical industries and an international patron of science – became the unencumbered property of ISH.

At the beginning of the 1970s a further extension was added to ISH when an adjoining building was demolished to make way for a new tract to accommodate 91 students. The next step was the acquisition of an old building at Rechengasse 1, which had a storey added, the facades renovated and the windows replaced, and in 1980/81 four studios were purchased at Rechengasse 3. Thanks to a legacy received in 1985 from Consul Hanns Bisegger, an industrialist from Bielefeld, another eight studios were acquired at Rechengasse 3, three at Hormayrstrasse 12 and also eight parking spaces for use by students. In the same year work started on a loft conversion project at Rechengasse 1, which created two shared apartments for a total of twelve students. From 1986 to 1996 all four buildings benefitted from continuous refurbishment and the installation of such amenities as telephone and cable television.

=== General refurbishment starting in 1998 ===
In view of the effects of decades of intensive use of the buildings and the higher standards expected of student accommodation in the meantime, the Supervisory Board gave its approval for a general refurbishment in 1996. The work, which started in 1998, involved thorough renovations to two tracts, reconstruction of the oldest part of the building and rehabilitation of the fourth tract. In the four years from 1998 to the summer of 2002, accommodation for 400 students was renovated and total capacity increased for a further 270.

=== Additional roles ===
Prior to the general refurbishment in 1998, ISH was also made available for various functions in addition to its role as a student residence. These activities were doubly useful: for image-building for ISH and as a source of finance for cost-intensive construction work.

- Press accommodation for the 1964 and 1976 Winter Olympics

Use of the residence as a hotel for representatives of the press during the Winter Olympic Games in 1964 and 1976 was a particularly striking example of the business acumen of the ISH management and made a significant contribution to the finances required for various construction projects. 450 journalists from all over the world reported on the Olympic events from their base in the converted student residence.

- Summer hotel from the 1960s until 1999

Summer hotel operations were another source of useful finance. From the beginning of the 1960s until the first phase of the general refurbishment, ISH let rooms in cooperation with tourist offices and agents and local hotels during the summer vacations. ISH was run as a bed and breakfast hotel for individual visitors and groups and was awarded 2½ stars by the Österreichischer Fachverband der Beherbergungsbetriebe.

- Shoe industry trade shows in the 1980s

At the beginning of the 1980s annual shoe industry trade shows were held on the premises of ISH at which manufacturers presented their new collections in parallel with the Innsbruck Autumn Trade Fair. These trade shows attracted fifty to seventy shoe manufacturers from Austria, Germany and Italy.

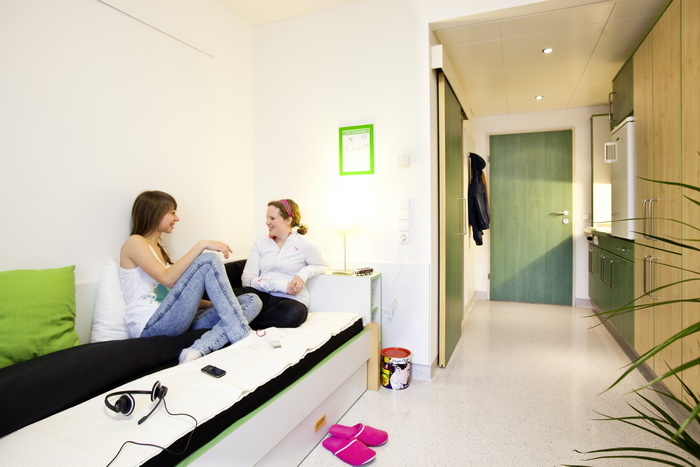
Single room

== Facilities ==
=== Rooms ===
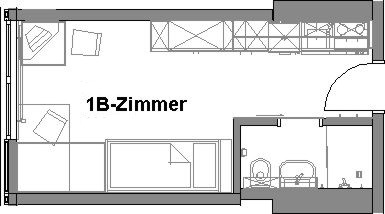
Layout of a single room

In addition to accommodation units with bath and kitchen for one person, ISH also has a number of apartments for two to six persons, who share the hall, bath and kitchen but have a room of their own. There are also some studios and small apartments and barrier-free units for one or two persons each as well.

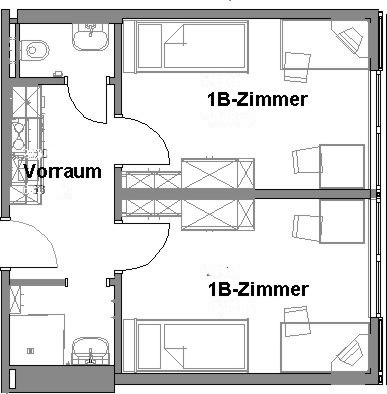
Layout of a flat share for two students

The main building has a communications room with several PC workstations, a winter garden, two terraces and a garden. There are laundry rooms with coin-operated washing machines and driers as well.

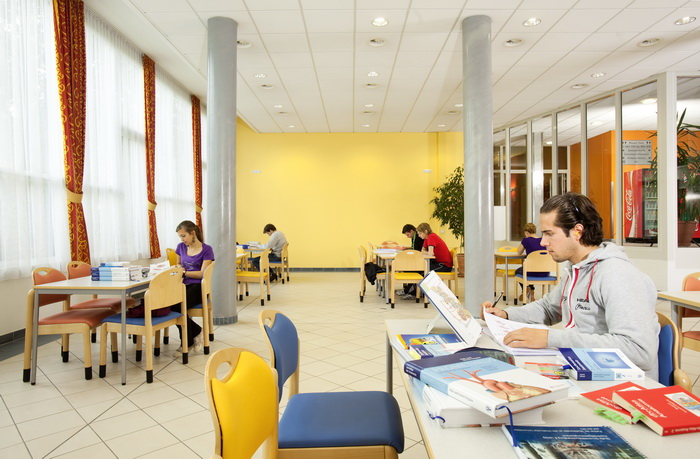
Common room

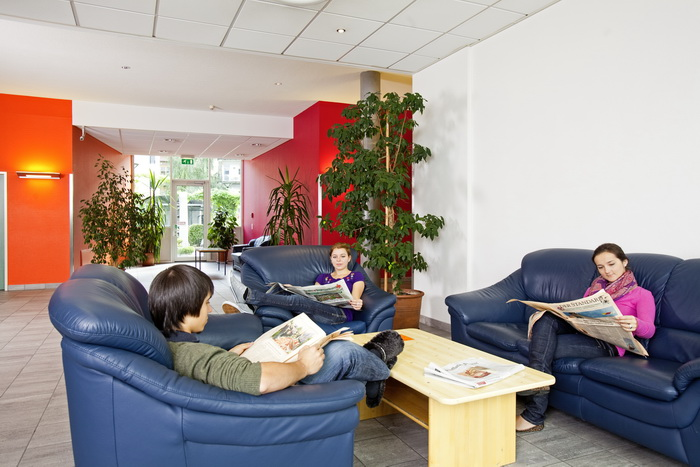
Reading corner

ISH also has seminar and conference facilities. With two seminar rooms for up to thirty participants each, a foyer with a cloakroom and a small kitchen.

=== Parking ===
As in most parts of Innsbruck, the streets around ISH are in a short-term parking zone where charges apply. Residents can rent parking spaces in the grounds of ISH or in its basement car park. For bicycles there are both cycle shelters and a lockable storage room in the basement.

=== Leisure facilities at ISH ===
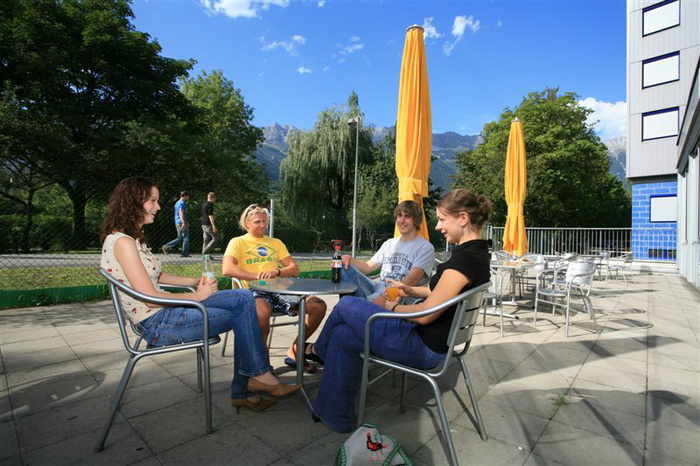
Terrace

There are several rooms for leisure activities e.g. table-tennis, billiard, fitness rooms, four music rooms, a mediation room, TV-lounges and a party room.

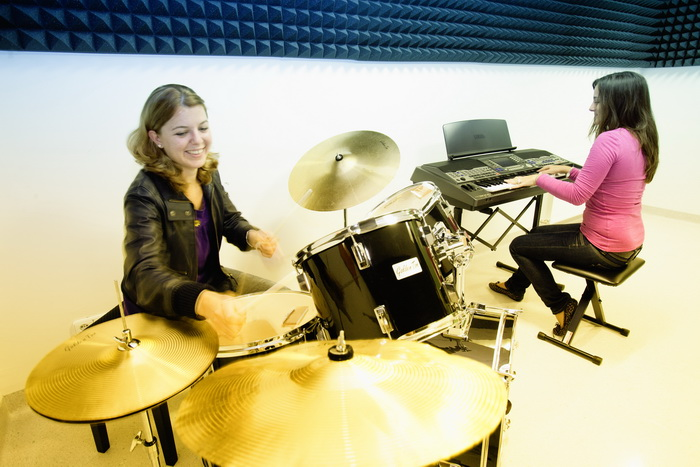
Music room

== Bibliography / sources ==
- Internationales Studentenhaus GmbH (ed.): Festschrift anlässlich 50 Jahre Internationales Studentenhaus Innsbruck und Abschluss der Generalsanierung sowie des Neubaues, Innsbruck 2002
- ISH website: http://www.studentenhaus.at
