= Elkie =

Elkie is a given name. Notable people with the name include:

- Elkie Brooks (born 1945), English singer
- Elkie Chong (born 1998), Hong Kong singer and actress

== See also ==
- Elke
- Ellie
- Noam Elkies (born 1966), American mathematician
