= Biographical film =

Film genre

A biographical film, or biopic (/ˈbaɪoʊˌpɪk/, biographical picture), is a film that dramatizes the life of a real person or sometimes a group of people. Such films show the life of the person and the central character's real name is used. They differ from docudrama films and historical drama films in that they attempt to comprehensively tell a single person's life story or at least the most historically important years of their lives.

== Context ==
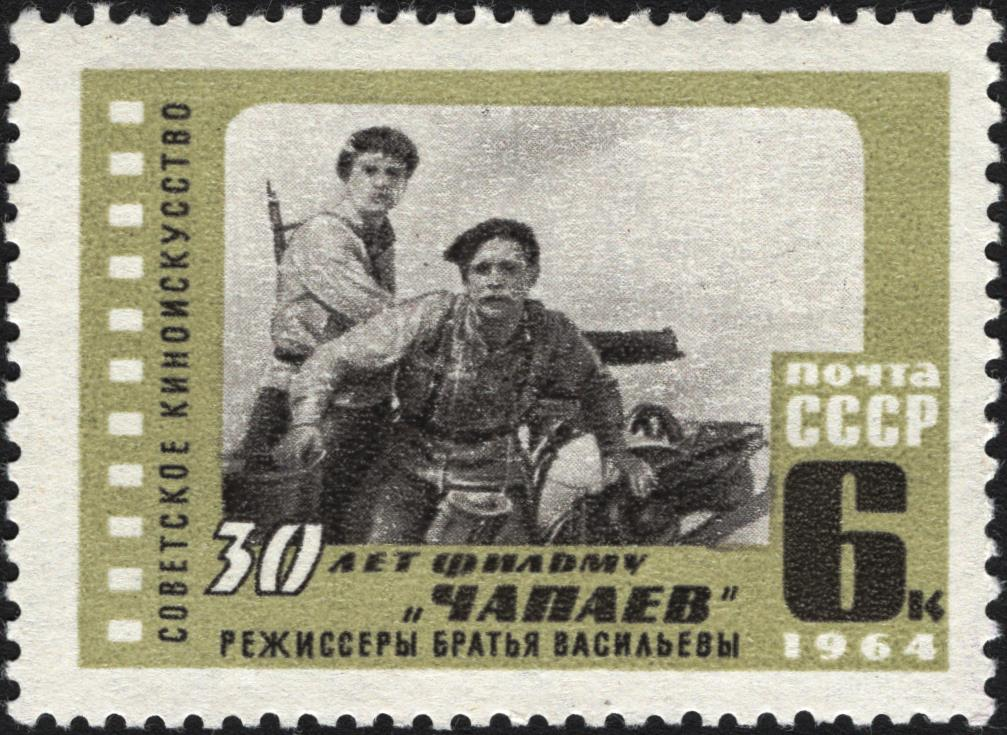
Chapaev, a 1934 biopic of Russian war hero Vasily Chapayev.

Biopic scholars include George F. Custen of the College of Staten Island and Dennis P. Bingham of Indiana University–Purdue University Indianapolis. Custen, in Bio/Pics: How Hollywood Constructed Public History (1992), regards the genre as having died with the Hollywood studio era, and in particular, Darryl F. Zanuck. On the other hand, Bingham's 2010 study Whose Lives Are They Anyway? The Biopic as Contemporary Film Genre shows how it perpetuates as a codified genre using many of the same tropes used in the studio era that has followed a similar trajectory as that shown by Rick Altman in his study, Film/Genre. Bingham also addresses the male biopic and the female biopic as distinct genres from each other, the former generally dealing with great accomplishments, the latter generally dealing with female victimization. Ellen Cheshire's Bio-Pics: a life in pictures (2014) examines British/American films from the 1990s and 2000s. Each chapter reviews key films linked by profession and concludes with further viewing list. Christopher Robé has also written on the gender norms that underlie the biopic in his article, "Taking Hollywood Back" in the 2009 issue of Cinema Journal.

Roger Ebert defended The Hurricane and distortions in biographical films in general, stating "those who seek the truth about a man from the film of his life might as well seek it from his loving grandmother. ... The Hurricane is not a documentary but a parable."

== Casting ==
Casting can be controversial for biographical films. Casting is often a balance between similarity in looks and ability to portray the characteristics of the person. Anthony Hopkins felt that he should not have played Richard Nixon in Nixon because of a lack of resemblance between the two. The casting of John Wayne as Genghis Khan in The Conqueror was objected to because of the American Wayne being cast as the Mongol warlord. Egyptian critics criticized the casting of Louis Gossett Jr., an African American actor, as Egyptian president Anwar Sadat in the 1983 TV miniseries Sadat. Also, some objected to the casting of Jennifer Lopez in Selena because she is a New York City native of Puerto Rican descent while Selena was Mexican American.

== Film representations ==
Although biographical movies are based on true events, some movies purposely stretch the truth in order to make the film more engaging. An example of this is Confessions of a Dangerous Mind, which was based on game show host Chuck Barris and his memoir of the same name, where he claimed to be a CIA agent.

Because the figures portrayed are actual people, whose actions and characteristics are known to the public (or at least historically documented), biopic roles have been described as demanding for actors and actresses. Warren Beatty, Faye Dunaway, Ben Kingsley, Johnny Depp, Jim Carrey, Jamie Foxx, Robert Downey Jr., Brad Pitt, Emma Thompson, Tom Hanks, Eddie Redmayne, Cillian Murphy, and Jaafar Jackson have starred in biopics: Beatty and Dunaway as Clyde Barrow and Bonnie Parker in Bonnie and Clyde (1967), Kingsley as Mahatma Gandhi in Gandhi (1982), Depp as Ed Wood in Ed Wood (1994), Carrey as Andy Kaufman in Man on the Moon (1999), Downey as Charlie Chaplin in Chaplin (1992) and as Lewis Strauss in Oppenheimer (2023), Foxx as Ray Charles in Ray (2004), Thompson and Hanks as P. L. Travers and Walt Disney in Saving Mr. Banks (2013), Redmayne as Stephen Hawking in The Theory of Everything (2014), Hanks as Fred Rogers in A Beautiful Day in the Neighborhood (2019), Murphy as J. Robert Oppenheimer in Oppenheimer (2023), and Jackson as Michael Jackson in Michael (2026).

In rare cases, sometimes called auto biopics, the subject of the film plays themself. Examples include Jackie Robinson in The Jackie Robinson Story (1950), Muhammad Ali in The Greatest (1977), Audie Murphy in To Hell and Back (1955), Patty Duke in Call Me Anna (1990), Bob Mathias in The Bob Mathias Story (1954), Arlo Guthrie in Alice's Restaurant (1969), Fantasia in Life Is Not a Fairytale (2006), and Howard Stern in Private Parts (1997).

In 2018, the musical biopic Bohemian Rhapsody, based on the life of Queen singer Freddie Mercury, became the highest-grossing biopic at the time. In 2023, the title was claimed by the movie Oppenheimer, based on the life of J. Robert Oppenheimer and his role in the creation of the atomic bomb in World War II. The musical biopic Michael, based on the life of Michael Jackson, dethroned Oppenheimer in 2026; following its release in April, the movie grossed $1.029 billion worldwide, making it the first biopic to reach $1 billion.

== See also ==
- Biographical novel
- Biography in literature
- List of biographical films
- List of highest-grossing biographical films
- Narrative identity#Autobiographical memory
