= Elkan =

Elkan is a surname and given name. Notable people with the name include:

Surname:

- Benno Elkan OBE (1877–1960), German-born British sculptor and medalist
- Moses Elkan (died 1822), Hebrew scholar
- Sophie Elkan (1853–1921), Swedish-Jewish writer and translator
- Vera Elkan (1908–2008), South African photographer

Given name:

- Elkan Allan (1922–2006), British television producer and print journalist
- Elkan Baggott (born 2002), Indonesian football player
- Elkan Blout (1919–2006), professor of biochemistry at Harvard University
- Elkan Harrison Powell (1888–1966), the visionary president of Encyclopædia Britannica Inc.
- Elkan Nathan Adler (1861–1946), Anglo-Jewish author, lawyer, historian, collector of Jewish books and manuscripts
- Elkan Naumburg (1835–1924), New York City merchant, banker, philanthropist, musicologist, and sponsor of the arts in Manhattan

== See also ==
- Elkann, a surname
