= Zita Jungman =

British socialite (1903–2006)

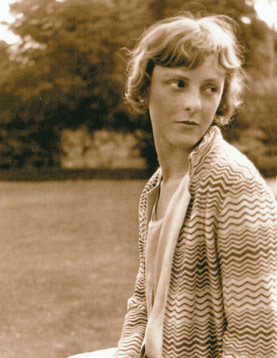
- Jungman in 1928
- Born: Zita Cora Mary Jungmann; 13 September 1903; Fulham, London, England
- Died: 18 February 2006 (aged 102); Leixlip, County Kildare, Ireland
- Occupation: Socialite
- Years active: 1921–2006
- Known for: Member of the Bright Young Things
- Spouse: Arthur James (m. 1929; div. 1932)
- Father: Nico Jungmann
- Relatives: Teresa Jungman (sister)

Zita James (born Zita Cora Mary Jungmann; 13 September 1903 – 18 February 2006), known professionally as Zita Jungman, was a British socialite. Along with her sister, Teresa, she was best known as one of the "Bright Young Things" in the 1920s.

== Early life ==
Zita Cora Mary Jungmann was born in Fulham, West London, England on 13 September 1903, as the middle child to Nicolaas Wilhelm Jungmann, a Dutch-born artist who went on to be a naturalized British subject, and his wife, Beatrice Mary Jungmann (née Mackey), an English socialite who came from a devout Roman Catholic family in Birmingham. She had two siblings, a brother, Loye Joseph Severin Jungmann, and a sister, Mary Theresa Cuthbertson (née Jungmann). Her father was interned by German forces in the Ruhleben internment camp during the First World War, due to his British citizenship, which eventually led to her parents' divorce in 1918. The following year, her mother became the second (or third wife, counting an annulment) wife of Robert Sidney Guinness, an Irish member of the Guinness family.

Jungman attended Miss Wolf's school in London and Miss Douglas's school at Queen's Gate School.

== Public image ==
Jungman was a socialite. While studying at Queen's Gate School, she met Lady Eleanor Smith and Allanah Harper, and together the trio became early members of what the British press would go on to call the "Bright Young Things".

Sacheverell Sitwell, a writer, was greatly taken by Jungman, however, his affection was unrequited; in part because she was a devout Catholic and he was married to Georgia Dobble. The pair met in the autumn of 1926, with Sitwell asking her not to marry "just anyone". Jungman was attracted to his brother, Osbert Sitwell, a writer. Dobble became jealous, and much to her confusion, befriended Jungman. She cut off her relationship with Sachie in 1934. They did not meet again until much later in life.

Jungman later lived in reduced circumstances with her sister, Baby, until aided by a bequest from Charlie Brocklehurst, an old admirer of her sister. She continued to appear on television in her centenarian years.

== Personal life ==
Jungman married Arthur Walter James, a maternal grandson of the 4th Duke of Wellington, at St James's, Spanish Place on 29 January 1929. The couple later separated and their divorce was finalised in 1932.

Jungman is the sitter in four portraits at the National Portrait Gallery. She once tried to spend a night in Madame Tussauds Chamber of Horrors with her sister, Baby. They removed the wax models of the "Princes in the Tower" to make themselves a bed and were discovered by security staff during the night. She had lived with her sister for almost a century of her life.

Jungman celebrated her 100th birthday in Ireland in September 2003, becoming a centenarian. She died at her home in Leixlip, County Kildare, Ireland on 18 February 2006, aged 102. She was the subject of several obituaries. Her sister, Baby, who died at their home in Ireland on 11 June 2010, aged 102.
