= John Altman =

John Altman may refer to:

- John Altman (actor) (born 1952), English actor and singer
- John Altman (composer) (born 1949), English film composer, music arranger, orchestrator and conductor
- John Altman (author) (born 1969), American thriller writer

== See also ==
- John Altmann (1916–1983), Australian rules footballer
- Jon Charles Altman (born 1954), Australian social scientist
