= Jungmann =

Jungmann is a German surname. Notable people with the surname include:

- Bernard Jungmann (1833–1895), Catholic priest
- Ctirad Jungmann, Czech rower
- Josef Jungmann (1773–1847), Bohemian linguist
- Nico Wilhelm Jungmann (1872–1935), Dutch painter
- Raul Jungmann (1952–2026), Brazilian business consultant and politician
- Taylor Jungmann (born 1989), American baseball player

== See also ==
- Jungman
- Bücker Bü 131, German airplane
