= The Royal Game =

1942 novella by Stefan Zweig

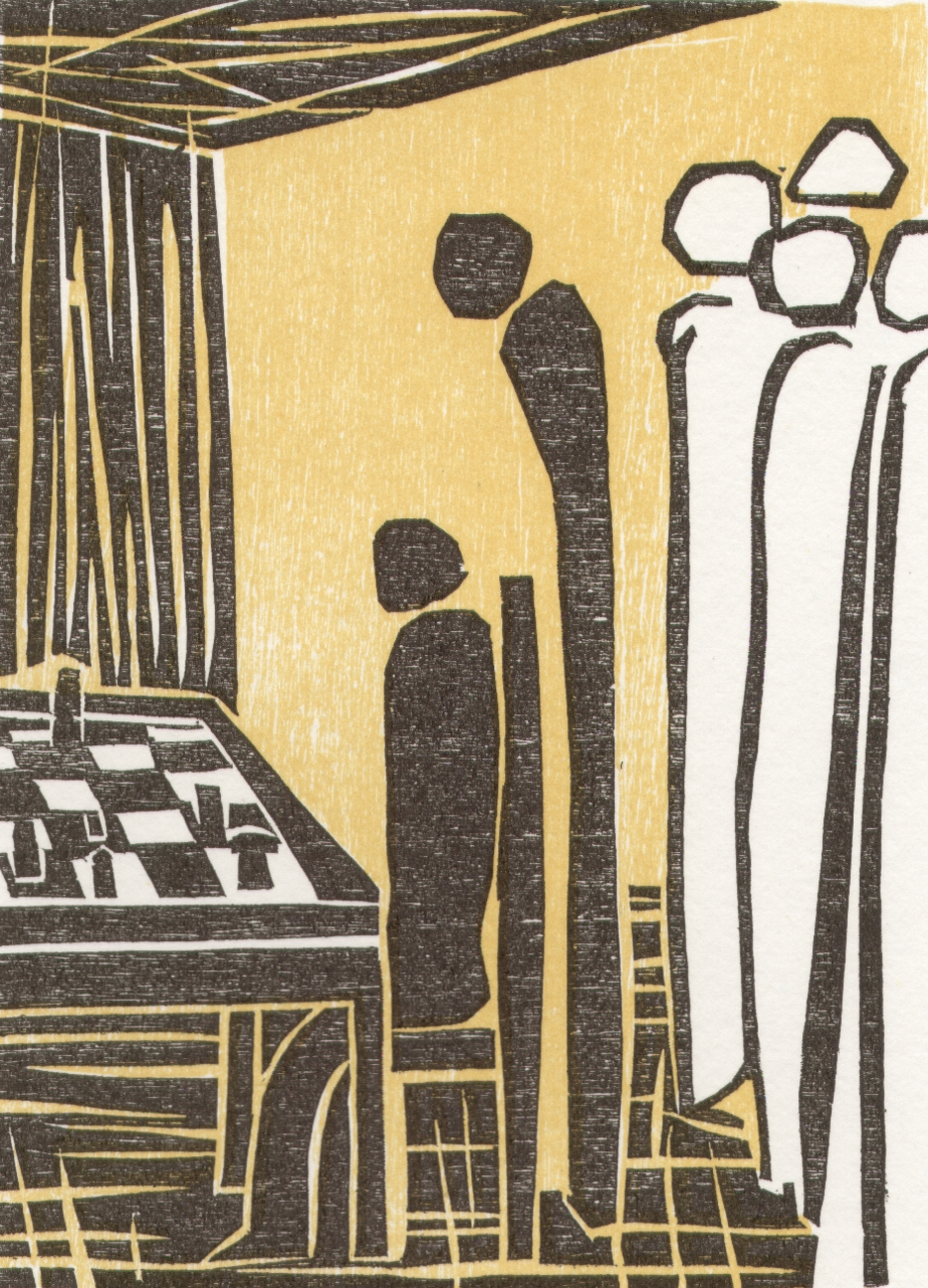
- One of Elke Rehder's six woodcuts for The Royal Game
- Author: Stefan Zweig
- Original title: Schachnovelle
- Working title: The Royal Game
- Language: German
- Genre: Novella
- Publisher: Verlag Pigmalión
- Publication date: 1942
- Publication place: Argentina

The Royal Game (also published as Chess, Chess Story, and A Chess Story; in the original German Schachnovelle, "Chess Novella") is a novella by the Austrian author Stefan Zweig written in 1941, the year before the author's death by suicide. The title has also been used for a collection that also includes "Amok", "Burning Secret", "Fear", and "Letter From an Unknown Woman".

== Plot summary ==
An anonymous narrator opens the story by describing the boarding of a passenger liner traveling from New York to Buenos Aires. One of the passengers is world chess champion Mirko Czentovic. Czentovic is an idiot savant and prodigy with no obvious qualities apart from his talent for chess. The narrator plays chess with his wife, hoping to draw Czentovic's attention and engage him in a game. The narrator draws the attention of McConnor, a businessman, who offers to pay Czentovic's fee.

A group of passengers (including the narrator and McConnor) play Czentovic in a consultation game, which Czentovic wins. They are about to lose a second game when they are interrupted by Dr B., who prevents them from blundering and guides the party to a draw.

Dr B. tells his story to the narrator. He was a lawyer who managed the assets of the Austrian nobility and church. He was arrested by the Gestapo, who hoped to extract information from Dr B. in order to steal the assets. The Gestapo kept Dr B. imprisoned in a hotel, in total isolation, but Dr B. maintained his sanity by stealing a book of past masters' chess games, which he learned completely. After absorbing every single move in the book, he began to play against himself, developing the ability to separate his psyche into two personas. He spent more and more time pacing up and down his cell, mentally playing chess games. This behavior became more and more obsessive and frantic, as he gradually was losing contact with reality. At some point, he accidentally wounded himself and was carried to a hospital. A sympathetic physician, knowing of his situation, attested his insanity to keep him from being imprisoned again by the Nazis, and he was freed. The doctor advised him to avoid chess, in order not to trigger his compulsive behavior.

The passengers persuade Dr B. to play alone against Czentovic. Dr B. agrees, as he wants to know if his chess ability was real or only a self delusion, but warns that he must not be allowed to play a second game. In a stunning demonstration of his imaginative and combinational powers, Dr B. beats the world champion. Czentovic suggests another game to restore his honour, and Dr B. immediately agrees. But this time, having sensed that Dr B. was impatient when Czentovic took too long to move, Czentovic tries to irritate his opponent by taking several minutes to make each move, thereby putting psychological pressure on Dr B., who gets more and more agitated as the game proceeds. He begins to walk around the room between moves, as in a trance, rehearsing imagined matches against himself repeatedly and manically. The narrator is alarmed as he sees the old obsession resurfacing. Dr B. eventually declares a check by his bishop that isn't there: in his mind he's playing a different game from that on the board. The narrator urges Dr B. to stop playing, recalling to him the doctor's advice, which awakens Dr B. from his frenzy. He resigns the game, apologizes for his outbursts, and withdraws from the board. As Dr B. leaves, Czentovic comments that he had been mounting a reasonable attack.

== Historical background ==
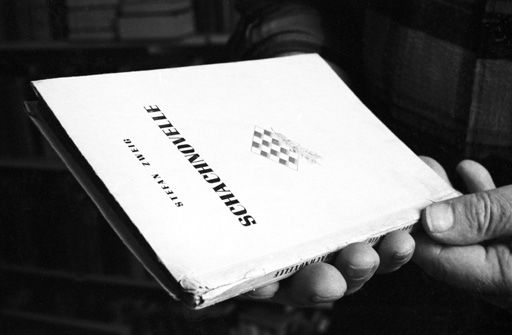
The first edition of The Royal Game

Following the occupation and annexation of Austria by Nazi Germany, the country's monarchists (i.e. supporters of Otto von Habsburg as the rightful Emperor-Archduke and the rule of the House of Habsburg), conservatives as well as supporters of Engelbert Dollfuss' Austrofascist regime, were severely persecuted by the Nazis, as they were seen as opponents of the Nazi regime. Thousands of monarchists were executed or sent to concentration camps, and the pretender to the throne, Otto von Habsburg, fled to the United States, being sentenced to death in absentia by the Nazis.

=== Alekhine vs. Bogoljubow, Pistyan 1922 ===
Alekhine vs. Bogoljubow, Pistyan 1922
(or: Czentovic vs. McConnor, Dr B. et al)

Position: c8 black rook, g8 black king, g7 black pawn, a6 black pawn, d6 white pawn, e4 white pawn, a3 white bishop, d3 black knight, c2 black pawn, g2 white pawn, h2 white pawn, f1 white rook, g1 white king

Position following 38. d6. Both the real game and the fragment depicted in the story continued 39. h4 Rc4 40. e5 Nxe5, later ending in a draw

Throughout the story, chess games are not described in detail. Instead, the narrative focuses on the general nature of chess and the psychological aspects of gameplay. One exception occurs during the second consultation game against Czentovic, which is described in some detail. Czentovic plays as White while McConnor, the narrator and others jointly decide each move for Black. Following 37... c2 and White's response, the consultation party are about to play 38... c1=Q?, promoting their pawn to a queen, but they are stopped at the last moment by Dr B., who enters the story.

Dr B. explains that the newly promoted black queen will be captured immediately by a white bishop, which will then be captured by a black knight, after which White will advance his own passed pawn to d7, attacking a black rook. According to Dr B., even if Black responds by checking White with their knight, White will still win in "nine or ten" moves. Dr B. says that the position — and the above‑threatened combination — are "almost the same" as Alekhine vs. Bogoljubow, Pistyan, 1922. Dr B. instead advises 38... Kh7, which Black plays. In the story, play continues 39. h4 Rc4 40. e5 Nxe5, and Dr B. advises Black to "force an exchange". "Some seven moves later", Czentovic offers a draw.

Although the story's game—and its position at the critical moment—are not described in full, the given details (and potential variation) are identical with the real game mentioned by Dr B., played between Alekhine and Bogoljubow, following 38. d6. The fictional game, also like the real one, ended as a draw (roughly) seven moves after 40... Nxe5 was played. The real game concluded with each side capturing the other's passed pawns (which each threatened immediate promotion); in the final position the material was equal (White had a bishop for Black's knight), although Black retained a passed pawn at a6.

=== Algebraic notation ===
Both in its original German text and also in later translations, The Royal Game makes use of algebraic notation to describe chess moves. At the time of its publication (and of its fictional setting) in the early 1940s, algebraic notation was widespread in German-speaking chess culture, but had not been widely accepted in the Anglosphere, which still made use of descriptive notation. During the 1970s and 1980s, algebraic notation was gradually accepted in the English-speaking world and standardized by FIDE as the proper method for recording chess games. The use of algebraic notation in English translations of The Royal Game is therefore not an anachronism.

In the story, algebraic notation itself also functions as a plot device. When Dr B. suffers a nervous breakdown and recovers in a hospital, a doctor asks whether he is a mathematician or a chemist. During Dr B.'s delirium, he would shout formulaic expressions, e.g. "c3, c4", terminology unfamiliar to the medical staff.

== Adaptations ==
The Royal Game was the inspiration for the 1960 Gerd Oswald film Brainwashed, originally titled Schachnovelle, as well as for two Czechoslovak films: the 1980 Královská hra (The Royal Game) and Šach mat (Checkmate), made for television in 1964.

The Royal Game was also the inspiration for the 2021 Philipp Stölzl film Chess Story, originally titled Schachnovelle.

In 2024 Jason Kouchak performed the world premiere of his composition The Royal Game at the opening of the 45th Chess Olympiad in Budapest.

An opera based on the novel premiered at the Kiel Opera House on 18 May 2013. The music was by Cristóbal Halffter, and the libretto by Wolfgang Haendeler.

The story was the basis of the production 64 Squares from the Rhum and Clay Theatre Company presented at the Edinburgh Festival Fringe in August 2015. In this production the character "B" is played by three actors, both separately and together, assisted by a percussionist.

The 2023 Hungarian psychological thriller Mastergame has several story elements and characters based on the novel. Most of the movie is set on the last refugee train leaving the country as the 1956 Revolution is being crushed by the invading Soviet army. "B", in this movie is a priest who was first tortured by the Nazis during the war to reveal the location of church treasure he hid to prevent the Nazis from taking it, and managed to withstand physical torture and not talk. Now the Communists try to get the location of the same treasure out of him, opting for a different approach, trying psychological torture by keeping him in isolation. However, not everything is as it seems: the chess book he manages to steal was planted deliberately to induce his schizophrenia and break him mentally, while Czentovic is also deeply involved in this plot.
