= MCI Management Center Innsbruck =

University-level business school located in Innsbruck, Austria

Coordinates: 47°16′08″N 11°23′51″E

- Motto: Mentoring the Motivated; The Entrepreneurial School
- Type: Public Private Partnership
- Established: 1995/1996
- Endowment: 30 Mio Euro (2015)
- Rector: Andreas Altmann
- Academic staff: 250 full-time employees (faculty & management), 1.000 part-time lecturers (2015)
- Students: approx. 3000 (2015), approx. 50% female
- Location: Innsbruck, Austria
- Website: www.mci.edu

MCI Management Center Innsbruck, located in Innsbruck, Austria, is a private business school that provides a range of study programs culminating in Bachelor’s and Master’s degrees. Additionally, it offers Executive Master’s programs such as MBA, MSc, and LL.M., alongside Executive Certificate programs, management seminars, tailored programs, and research opportunities.

== History and Organisation ==
The Management Center Innsbruck (MCI) was founded in 1995-96 as a university center under private law and owned largely by public organizations. The funding structure is as follows:

- 75% "Träger-Verein MZT" comprising the Tyrolean regional authority, the Innsbruck local authority, the Tyrolean Chamber of Commerce, the Tyrolean Chamber of Labor, the Federation of Tyrolean Industries, the University of Innsbruck, and the Faculty of Social Science and Economics at the University of Innsbruck
- 12.5% "Träger-Verein Technik"
- 12.5% "Träger-Verein Tourismus"

The work of the MCI is additionally supported by sponsoring companies from a variety of industries.

The MCI is accredited to provide university-level applied science study programs pursuant to Art. 2 of the Austrian University of Applied Sciences Studies Act.

== Campus & Student Life ==
MCI is located in the center of Innsbruck offering 5 different campuses:

- MCI I +II: centrally located between the historic Old Town of Innsbruck and sharing the ground with the Faculty of Theology and the Faculty of Economics & Statistics of Innsbruck University, Universitaetsstrasse 15
- MCI III: Weiherburggasse 15, hosting MCI programs in the field of tourism
- MCI IV: Maximilianstrasse 2, holding MCI programs in the field of engineering and technical sciences
- MCI V: Kapuzinergasse 9

Being part of the Open University Innsbruck concept, MCI and the Innsbruck University share infrastructure like lecture rooms, laboratories, sports facilities and cafeterias.

- These locations are to be replaced by a central campus adjoining Innsbruck's Hofgarten (opening 2020).

A co-operation agreement with the University of Innsbruck gives MCI students access to student services provided by Innsbruck University (e.g. libraries, sports facilities, etc).

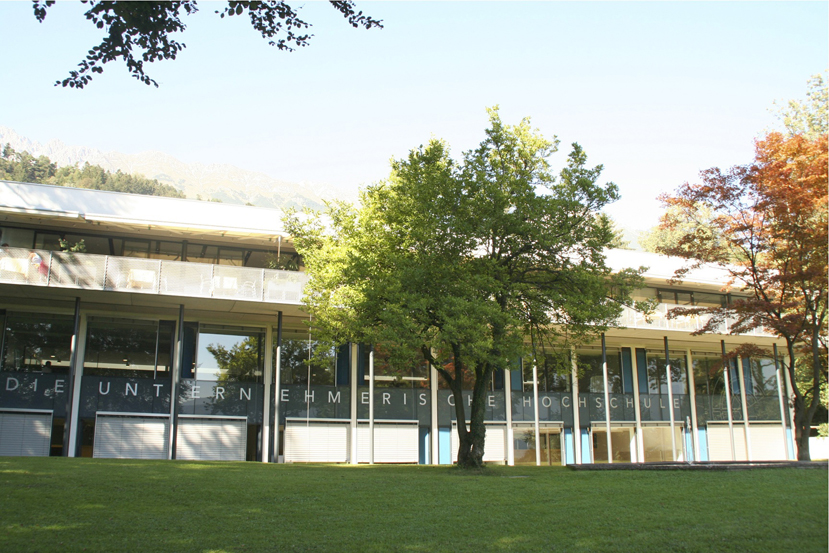
Gebäude MCI III

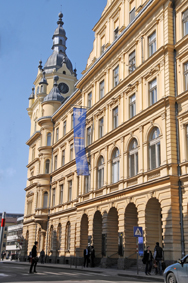
Gebäude MCI IV

== Bachelor & Master programs ==
The consecutive Bachelor and Master programs are university-level applied science study programs. Between the beginning of the 2005 winter semester and the 2009 winter semester, all MCI study programs were reorganized on the Bachelor/Master model as defined in the European Bologna Process. Students at the MCI can also take advantage of the option to spend a semester at one its 200 partner universities around the world. Double-degree and joint-degree programs are also offered currently with a total of eight partner universities.

=== Doctorate ===
A cooperation agreement between the University of Innsbruck and the MCI provides for cooperation with regard to doctoral programs. The MCI also provides tutoring for dissertations at currently ten other universities at home and abroad.

== Executive Education ==
=== Executive Master programs ===
MCI's postgraduate Executive Master programs are being offered within the framework of the Austrian University Law and are additionally accredited by the Foundation for International Business Administration Accreditation (FIBAA). MCI's LL.M.-program "International Business & Tax Law" is offered as a dual-degree study program in co-operation with the Frankfurt School of Finance & Management (FSFM). It is evenly split between Innsbruck and Frankfurt/Main and leads to the degrees of MCI and FSFM.

=== Executive Certificate Courses ===
Credits obtained for an Executive Certificate program are recognized for the above postgraduate Master study programs. Students who complete specific combinations of several certificate programs and write a final thesis at an appropriate academic standard (Master thesis) can be admitted to the academic degree of an MBA, MSc or LL.M.

== Partner universities ==
The MCI collaborates with about 280 partner universities, where students can spend one or more semesters of their study program. Additionally, double degree agreements exist with some of the MCI's partner universities.

== Awards & Rankings ==
AACSB International MCI is one of the few universities in German-speaking countries accredited by AACSB – the Association to Advance Collegiate Schools of Business, established in 1916 in the United States.

Universum Talent Survey 2017 The international Universum Survey showed that MCI won in the categories "Strongest Focus on Employability" and "Best Career Service" and ranked as 2nd Place in the category "Most Satisfied Students".

CHE Hochschulranking The latest university ranking by the international center for higher education CHE listed programs in Economics, Social Sciences, Industrial Engineering and Management among the top 80 programs it tracks.

FIBAA's Premium Seal The Foundation for International Business Administration Accreditation (FIBAA) has awarded its Premium Seal to the MCI's Executive Master study programs (Registered as a non-profit foundation under Swiss law and headquartered in Bonn, FIBAA operates as a European accreditation agency offering additional national accreditation)

- General Management Executive MBA, and
- Master of Science in Management MSc.

ECTS-Label On June 11, 2009, the MCI became the first Austrian university to be awarded the DS label and the ECTS—Label by the European Commission in Brussels. The two labels were renewed by the Commission in 2013.
