= Moses Elkan =

- Born: Tulchin, Podolsk Governorate, Russian Empire
- Died: January 31, 1822; Saint Petersburg, Saint Petersburg Governorate, Russian Empire

Moses Elkan (Hebrew: משה אלחנן, romanized: Moshe Elḥanan; died January 31, 1822) was a Russian medical doctor and Hebrew scholar.

Elkan's works include a hymn in Hebrew and French addressed to Czar Alexander I (Munich, 1811). He also published a manual in German on the history of the Jewish people, accompanied by a geographical sketch of Palestine, intended for use in Jewish schools. It was later translated into Russian by Z. Minor (Moscow, 1880).

== Publications ==
- Hymne adressée a Sa Majesté l'Empereur Alexander I (in Hebrew and French). Munich: Jos. Sidler. 1811.
- Leitfaden beim Unterricht in der Geschichte der Israeliten von den frühesten Zeiten bis auf unsere Tage (in German). Minden & Leipzig: F. Essmann. 1839.
