= Elkanah (name) =

Elkanah is a figure in the First Book of Samuel, the husband of Hannah and father of Samuel.

Elkanah may also refer to:

- A Levite, ancestor of a certain Berechiah. (1 Chronicles 9: 16)
- A Levite, son of the rebellious Korah and brother of Abiasaph. (Exodus 6: 24)
- A Levite, descendant of Korah, who "came to David at Ziklag while he was still under restrictions because of Saul". (1 Chronicles chapter 12)
- A Levite, descendant from Korah through Abiasaph, mentioned as the great grandfather of the next. (1 Chronicles chapter 6)
- A Levite, mentioned as the great great great grandfather of Elkanah, Samuel's father.
- One of the gatekeepers of the Ark of the Covenant, when David transferred it to Jerusalem. (1 Chronicles chapter 15)
- An official in king Ahaz' court. (2 Chronicles chapter 28)

See also Elkana or Elqana, a Jewish settlement in the northern West Bank.

Elkanah/Elkana can also be a surname or a male forename.

Some notable people with the first name Elkanah:

- Elkanah Settle (1648-1724) English poet and playwright
- Elkanah Billings (1820-1876) Canada's first paleontologist
- Elkanah Watson (1758-1842) American writer, agriculturalist and canal promoter
- Elkanah Angwenyi (born 1983) Kenyan 1500m runner
- Elkanah Armitage (1794-1876) British industrialist and Liberal politician.
- Elkanah Greer (1825-1877) American cotton planter and general
- Elkanah Young (1804-1876) Nova Scotia merchant and politician
- Elkanah Onyeali (died 2008) Nigerian footballer
- Elkanah Tisdale (1768-1835) American engraver and cartoonist
- Elkanah Kelsey Dare (1782-1826) American hymn composer

Some notable people surnamed Elkana:

- Amos Elkana (born 1967) Israeli composer, guitarist and electronic musician
- Yehuda Elkana (1934-2012) Israeli historian and philosopher of science, President of the Central European University in Budapest.
