= Altmann (1905 automobile) =

The Altmann was a German automobile made by Kraftfahrzeug-Werke GmbH, Brandenburg/Havel from 1905 to 1907. It was one of only a handful of German steam car makes, and was quite advanced for the era. Its valve timing engine allowed it to follow the Gardner-Serpollet principle, though the engine differed from that design in other aspects. Its three cylinders allowed it to produce 15 to 25 bhp (11 to 19 kW). Its use of a condensation system and ensuing low consumption of water gave it an effective range of around 125 miles (201 km) on a single tank of water. The death of its designer, Adolf Altmann, prevented it from being built on a large scale. The firm later went on to build electric cars.
