= Elke Rehder =

German artist and art collector (born 1953)

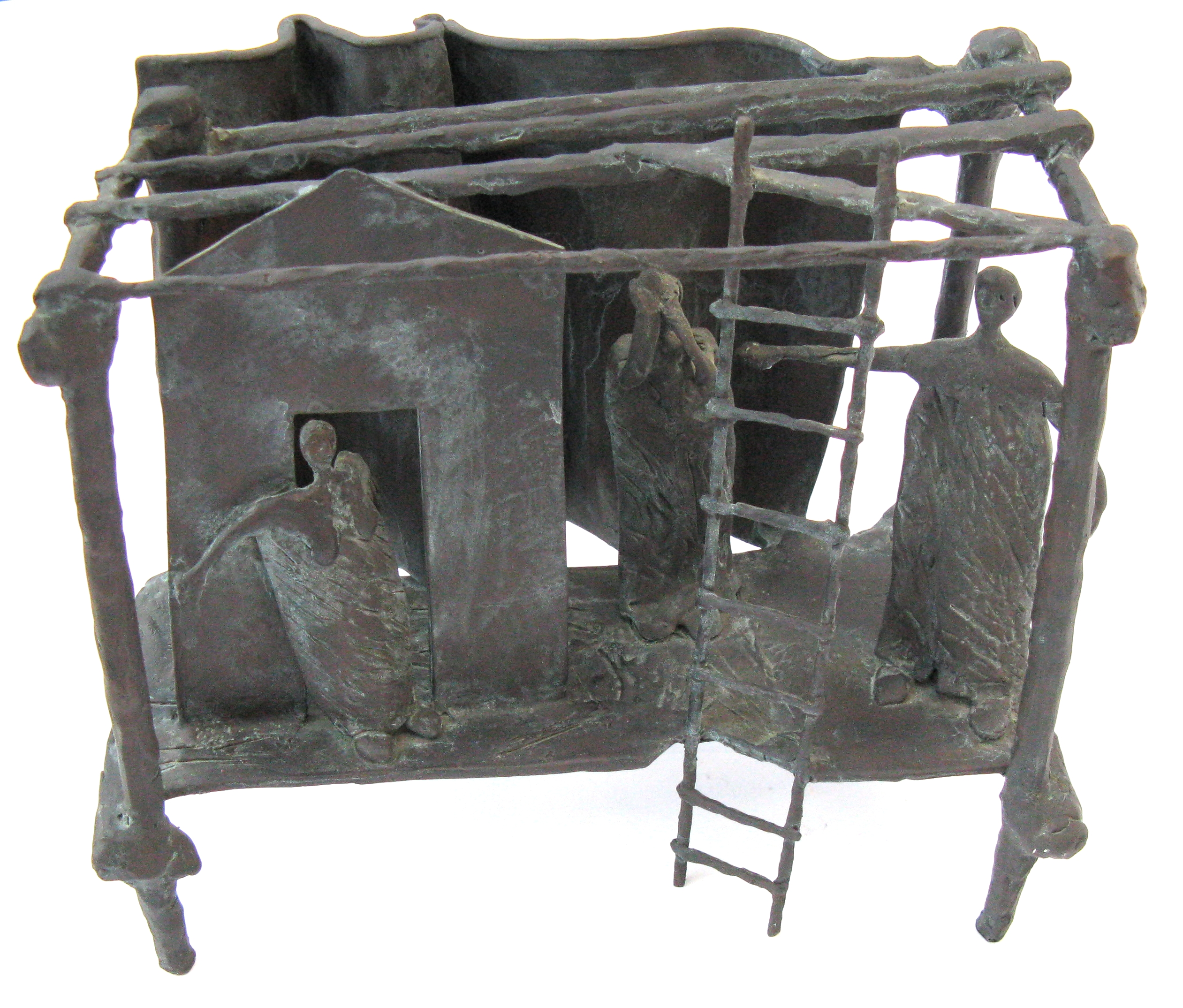
Theatre, 1992.

Elke Rehder (born 1953) is a German artist and art collector, most well known for her chess-themed installations. She currently resides in Barsbüttel, Germany.

== Life and work ==
From 1979 to 1980, Elke Rehder studied at the Heatherley School of Fine Art in London, England. As a student, she was predominantly active as a sculptor. During her time in London, chess became a centrepoint in her artwork due to a quote by Boris Spassky. After graduation, Rehder focused on creating installation art and land art centered around chess.

From 1991 to 1993, she studied painting at the Federal Academy of Cultural Education in Wolfenbüttel, Germany, and graphic arts at the Hamburg University of Applied Sciences.

She is also a collector of historical European prints and newspapers. In 2014, Rehder's personal collection contained more than 50,000 historical pictures. In 1992, she was honored with the Bernhard Kaufman Prize for art collection.

Since 1993, Rehder has made several installations about literature and lyric poetry. She founded the Elke Rehder Presse for printmaking. She has participated at the Leipzig Book Fair, the Frankfurt Book Fair, and the International Book Fair for Small Publishers and Private Presses (German: Mainzer Minipressen-Messe). She has done etchings to The Trial by Franz Kafka and woodcuts to The Royal Game by Stefan Zweig.

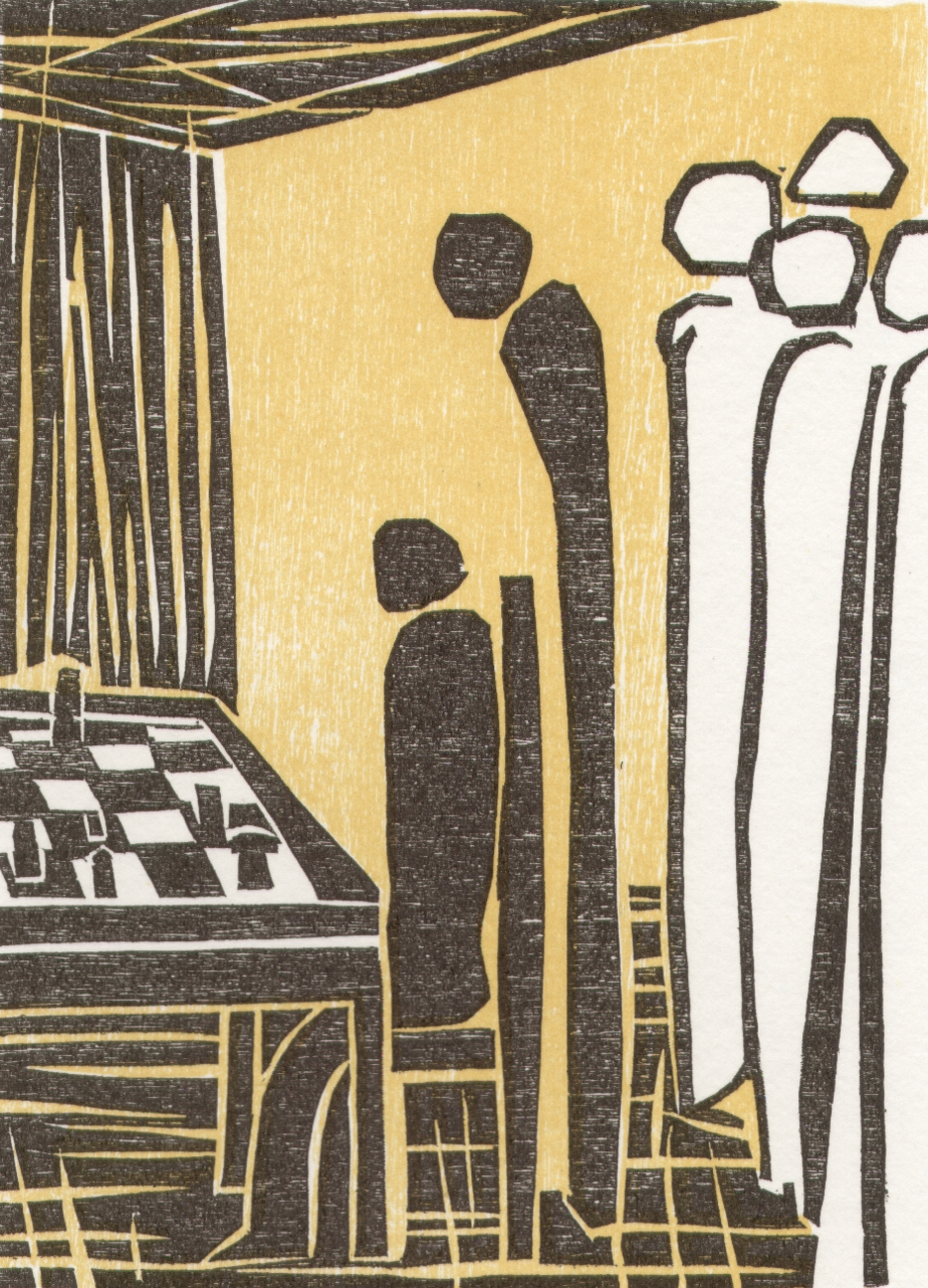
One of Rehder's six woodcuts for the chess novella The Royal Game, 1996

== Solo exhibitions (selected) ==
- 1992 Reinbek Castle, Reinbek, Germany
- 1993 Federal Ministry of Economics and Technology, Bonn / Berlin, Germany
- 1993 Gallery Art und Weise, Heide, Germany
- 1995 Stichting Ateliers, Driebergen, Netherlands
- 1999 Eutiner Landesbibliothek, Eutin, Germany
- 2000 Gallery Silvia Umla, Völklingen, Germany
- 2001 Haus der Kultur und Bildung, Neubrandenburg, Germany
- 2003 Beeskow Castle, Beeskow, Germany
- 2003 Saarland University, Saarbrücken, Germany
- 2006 Gottfried Wilhelm Leibniz Bibliothek, Hanover, Germany

== Group exhibitions (selected) ==
- 1995 Provinciaal Museum voor Moderne Kunst, Oostend, Belgium
- 1997 Kunsthalle Düsseldorf, Düsseldorf, Germany
- 1997 Internationale Kunstmesse "Kunstmarkt Dresden", Dresden, Germany
- 1998 Austrian National Library, Vienna, Austria
- 1998 Gallery Lang, Vienna, Austria
- 1998 PAPER ART exhibition Speicherstadt, Hamburg, Germany
- 1999 Germanisches Nationalmuseum, Nuremberg, Germany
- 2003 6th Triennale Mondiale d'Estampes, Chamalières, France
- 2005 Museum für Kunst und Gewerbe, Hamburg, Germany
- 2009 State Library of Schleswig-Holstein, Kiel, Germany
