= Teresa Jungman =

British socialite (1907–2010)

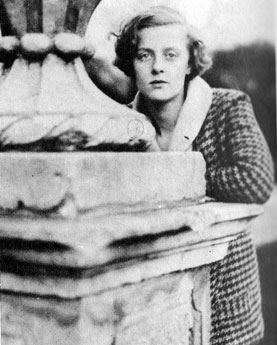
- Jungman in her 20s, c. 1928
- Born: Mary Theresa Jungmann; 9 July 1907; Fulham, London, England
- Died: 11 June 2010 (aged 102); Leixlip, County Kildare, Ireland
- Occupation: Socialite
- Years active: 1925–2010
- Known for: Member of the Bright Young Things
- Spouse: Sergeant Major Graham Cuthbertson (m. 1940; div. 1945)
- Children: 2
- Father: Nico Jungmann
- Relatives: Zita Jungman (sister); The Honourable Desmond Guinness (son-in-law)

Teresa Cuthbertson (née Jungmann; born Mary Theresa Jungmann; 9 July 1907 – 11 June 2010), known professionally as Teresa Jungman and nicknamed Baby, was a British socialite. Along with her sister, Zita, she was best known as one of the "Bright Young Things" in the 1920s.

== Early life ==
Mary Theresa Jungmann was born in Fulham, West London, England on 9 July 1907, as the youngest child to Nicolaas Wilhelm Jungmann, a Dutch-born artist who went on to be a naturalized British subject, and his wife, Beatrice Mary Jungmann (née Mackey), an English socialite who came from a devout Roman Catholic family in Birmingham. She had two siblings, a brother, Loye Joseph Severin Jungmann, and a sister, Zita Cora Mary James (née Jungmann). Her father was interned by German forces in the Ruhleben internment camp during the First World War, due to his British citizenship, which eventually led to her parents' divorce in 1918. The following year, her mother became the second (or third wife, counting an annulment) wife of Robert Sidney Guinness, an Irish member of the Guinness family.

== Public image ==
Baby was a socialite. She became well-known as one of the original "Bright Young Things" of the 1920s. At the time of her death, she was the last of the Bright Young Things.

Evelyn Waugh, a novelist, himself later a Catholic convert, was greatly taken by Baby, however, his affection was unrequited; in part because she was a devout Catholic and he was divorced from his first wife, Evelyn Gardner, herself a member of the Bright Young Things. Waugh met Baby in 1930, proposed to her in 1933, and was turned down; Waugh married Laura Herbert in 1937.

Baby had many admirers during the 1920s and 1930s, including Lord Margesson, the Conservative Chief Whip; Francis Egerton Grosvenor, 4th Lord Ebury; Lord David Cecil; "Bloggs" Baldwin (son of the Prime Minister and later the 3rd Earl Baldwin of Bewdley); and Frank Pakenham (later the 7th Earl of Longford). Another of her admirers was the 9th Duke of Marlborough, whose second wife, Gladys Deacon, nearly cited Baby in a divorce application.

Baby later lived in reduced circumstances with her sister, Zita, until aided by a bequest from an old admirer Charlie Brocklehurst. She remained friendly with the social elite and was a frequent visitor to events at which Queen Elizabeth The Queen Mother was present. She remained active in her field until her death.

== Personal life ==
Baby married a Scottish-Canadian Sergeant-Major Graham Maidment Cuthbertson in Marylebone, Middlesex, in April 1940. They had two children together: Richard William Graham Cuthbertson (1941–1964) and Penelope M Z "Penny" Guinness (née Cuthbertson; born 1943). Her husband left her for another woman and their divorce was finalised in 1945; in keeping with her Catholic beliefs, she never remarried. Her son died in a car crash at the age of 22. Her daughter became the second wife of Desmond Guinness (1931–2020), an Irish member of the Guinness family, in 1984.

Baby is the sitter in six portraits at the National Portrait Gallery. She once tried to spend a night in Madame Tussauds Chamber of Horrors with her sister, Zita. They removed the wax models of the "Princes in the Tower" to make themselves a bed and were discovered by security staff during the night. She had lived with her sister for almost a century of her life. Zita died at their home in Ireland on 18 February 2006, aged 102; Baby was 98 years old at the time of her sister's death.

Baby celebrated her 100th birthday in July 2007. She died at her home in Leixlip, County Kildare, Ireland on 11 June 2010, aged 102.

== See also ==
- List of centenarians (miscellaneous)
