= Eva Altmann =

German economist (1903–1991)

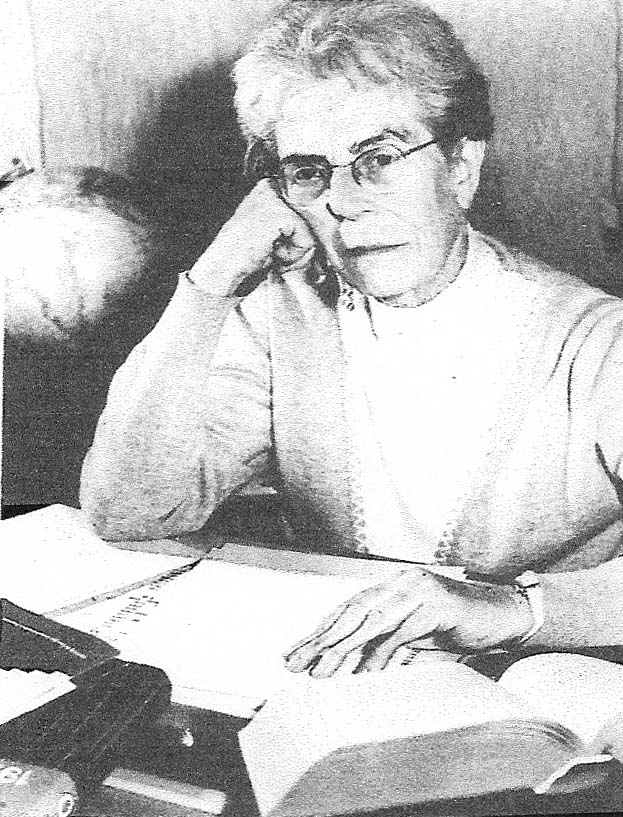

Eva Altmann (born Eva Pfingst: 17 December 1903 – 1 March 1991) was a German economist who in 1950 became the first rector of the new Academy for Economic Planning ("Hochschule für Planökonomie"), as the institution was known before 1956.

== Life ==
=== Provenance and early years ===
Eva Pfingst was born in Berlin. Her father was in business. She studied Economics at Frankfurt, Kiel and Berlin. In the meantime, she joined the Young Communists in 1921 and the Communist Party itself two years later. Sources stress that her communist belief was born of a deep conviction, which would endure through her adult life.

She married, and the young couple's son Franz Altmann was born. However, in the early 1930s her husband found another woman and emigrated to the Soviet Union with his new partner. In view of subsequent political developments in Germany, this may, inadvertently, have been a life saving move for Altmann, who was Jewish, but it left his wife bringing up her son alone.

=== Nazi years ===
Régime change came to Germany in January 1933 and the new government lost little time in imposing one-party dictatorship. Both as a Communist activist and as the mother of a young son with a Jewish father she encountered problems with the government. Her political activities had already led to her receiving a nine and a half month prison sentence during the increasingly unstable closing years of the "Weimar" period, in 1931/32, and after 1933 she was imprisoned again at various times during the twelve Nazi years. During 1933, despite political work becoming illegal, she worked briefly as a Communist Party at Eisleben, a short distance to the west of Halle. She spent six months from January till June 1934 in government custody.

After this she became a secretary and personal assistant for an industrial company In Berlin she was one of the co-accused in a trial that followed the murder of the actor Hans Otto, but was released due to lack of evidence. During the period that ended in 1945, when she was not in prison, she was frequently under sometimes intrusive police surveillance.

=== Soviet occupation zone ===
World War II ended in May 1945, leaving a large part of central Germany administered as the Soviet occupation zone. In October 1949 the occupation zone was relaunched as the German Democratic Republic (GDR / East Germany), a stand-alone Soviet sponsored alternative German state with its political and social structures consciously modelled on those developed by the Soviet Union for itself during the 1920s and 1930s. Personal tragedy struck in 1947 when Franz Altmann killed himself in connection with his love life. In professional terms, however, Eva Altmann was able to contribute as a true believer to the emerging Communist state. Between 1945 and 1947 she was employed in a succession of positions in the education system. In 1947 she graduated from an intensive training course in teaching at the newly formed ruling party's Karl Marx Academy in Kleinmachnow, on the edge of Berlin. Now clearly marked out as an academic high-flyer, in 1948 she was appointed to a post at the Humboldt University as lecturer in "The Economics of the Two Year Plan".

=== Academy for Economic Planning ===
In the early summer of 1950 she was mandated to set up a new Academy for Economic Planning ("Hochschule für Planökonomie") (Note: »Mitte Mai 1950 informierte mich der Staatssekretär im Ministerium für Planung Bruno Leuschner, es sei beschlossen, mich mit dem Aufbau einer Hochschule für Planökonomie zu beauftragen. Was brachte ich für diese Aufgabe mit? Erfahrungen in der Lehrarbeit sowie beim staatlichen Neuaufbau im Bereich der Volksbildung. Auch gute Kontakte zu einer Anzahl Berliner Betriebe. Aber eine Hochschule aufzubauen und zu leiten? Doch es gab sehr viele in der damaligen Zeit, die hineingeworfen wurden in neue, unbekannte Aufgaben. Neu nicht nur für sie selbst, sondern ohne Beispiel, verbunden mit der Errichtung einer neuen Gesellschaft. Drei Objekte wurden uns benannt, wir wählten das in Karlshorst. Zwei ehemalige Schulen, bisher genutzt durch die Sowjetische Militäradministration. Rundherum Brachland und Kleingärten und die Möglichkeit, Bauland für die Internate und andere Baulichkeiten zu gewinnen.« - Eva Altmann quoted from her own unpublished manuscript "In the Middle of May 1950 the Secretary of State for Planning, Bruno Leuschner, informed me that it had been decided to entrust me with creating an Academy for Economic Planning. What did I bring to the task? Teaching experience, along with reconstruction work in the field of public education. And good contacts with a number of Berlin businesses. But setting up and then leading an academy? New not only in itself, but without any existing model, and tied in with the creation of a new society. There were three sites proposed. We chose a one in Berlin-Karlshorst. Two former schools, which had been used till this point by the Soviet Military Administration. Adjacent were wasteland and garden plots which offered the possibility of constructing residential accommodation and other buildings.") The academy took over buildings vacated by the occupation forces and was accordingly ready to open on 4 October 1950, with 185 students and a staff of twenty. Altmann herself presided as the rector of the new academy. During the 1950s, with a small group of academics she created the basis for what would become, following a couple of mergers, the most important institution for economics research and teaching in the GDR. The courses, above all her own "Capital seminars" played a major part in the theoretical training of the early student cohorts, and for the development of a teaching staff for the new academy. She also published a substantial piece of research into the theoretical problems of capital recreation in West Germany.

Despite her unwavering commitment to the tenets of the socialist system, in April 1953 she received a severe reprimand from the powerful Party Central Committee because one of the academy's teachers had referred in a lecture to an article that had criticised Stalin. The political establishment was in a state of heightened nervousness at the time due to the doctrinal and practical uncertainties thrown up by the Soviet dictator's death earlier that month. The academy was officially condemned as a politically unacceptable "stronghold of opportunism" ("Hort des Opportunismus"). Though upset to find herself ferociously attacked in this way, she remained in her post till 1956, when a merger with the Finance Academy at Potsdam-Babelsberg and the Academy for Foreign Trade was set in motion. Handing over her leadership responsibilities to a successor, she now focused on tutoring students, especially those from abroad, supervising many for their doctoral dissertations.

=== Final decades ===
The reprimand she had received in 1953 was formally withdrawn on 5 December 1973. She was teaching and publishing her research in 1985, when she published as study of Marx's Das Kapital. Zum Studium von Karl Marx' Werk „Das Kapital“.

Altmann was badly affected by the events of 1989 which disclosed a widespread popular repudiation of the German Democratic Republic and the economic beliefs that had underpinned it. German reunification followed. She died in 1991.

== Personal ==
In an affectionate tribute, the journalist Hanna Maier later recorded aspects of Altmann's personality. She was deeply committed to her teaching. She disliked public speaking at conferences but dominated her lecture audiences at the academy. Her status meant that she was able to drive a car, but it was reported that she did not know how to switch on its headlights.

Lack of fresh produce in the shops was a constant feature of daily life in East Germany, and Altmann had a small dacha out of town with an allotment attached. A student who had visited her accompanied by her children later recalled an occasion when Altmann had taken her visitors to a nearby farm in order to buy some apples. The farmer stated that he had none. "That is not true", replied Altmann and marched briskly past the man to his cellar where she filled a basket with apples, pressing the due money into the man's hand as she left while asserting, "Children need apples".

== Honours and awards ==
- 1973 Order of Karl Marx
- 1959 Patriotic Order of Merit
- 1979 Patriotic Order of Merit Gold clasp
