= Vera Elkan =

South African photographer

- Vera Elkan in 1951
- Born: 1908
- Died: 2008 (aged 99–100)
- Known for: Photography
- Spouse: Henry Morley

Vera Elkan (1908–2008) was a British-South African photographer who is remembered for her images and film of the International Brigades in the Spanish Civil War. She was also known as Vera Innes Morley Elkan

== Biography ==
Born in South Africa to German parents, Elkan trained as a photographer in Berlin in the 1930s and worked as a photographer in Germany and South Africa. While based in London, she received funding from the British campaign in support of the International Brigades to go to Spain to photograph the activities of the Brigades. She travelled by ambulance to Alabacete in December 1936 at the behest of Ivor Montagu of the Progressive Film Unit, who commissioned Vera to make a film of the newly forming International Brigades. An impressive linguist, she moved easily amongst the polyglot troops and regiments, photographing German, French and British recruits at the training base in Albacete. Other images cover international journalists, a Valencia hospital, blood transfusions and air-raid casualties in Madrid. Her images also included shots of Mikhail Koltsov of Pravda, Claud Cockburn of the Daily Worker and of the physician Norman Bethune.

During World War Two (WW2) Elkan worked for the Political Warfare Executive (PWE) at Woburn Abbey, GB, 1939-1940; then as a NCO and Section Officer in the Women's Auxiliary Air Force (WAAF) attached to Y Service (signals intelligence), RAF in GB and Germany, 1941-1945

Elkan later worked as a portrait photographer in London but her studio was destroyed in the war, together with the bulk of her work. After the war, she concentrated on family life.

== Exhibitions ==
- Vera Elkan's Spanish series has been exhibited at the Marx Memorial Library, the Imperial War Museum and at the Tate Gallery. Her work is included in the IWM (2023) exhibition book 'War Photographers' as one of the five most important British war photo-correspondents.

== Books ==
- Vera Elkan Bunty and Bianco (Hamish Hamilton: 1938) photographs and text
- Tom Wintringham English Captain (Faber, 1939) photographs
- L.S. Michaelis and Vera Elkan First Aid through Photographs (Longman, Green & co, 1941) photographs
- Helen Graham The Spanish Republic at War 1936-1939 (Cambridge University Press, 2002) photographs
- Jordi Martí-Rueda, Brigadisties: Lives for Liberty (Pluto Press 2022) photographs
- Helen Mavin War Photographers (Imperial War Museum, 2023) photographs
