= Edith Altman =

German Jewish-American artist (1931–2020)

- Born: 23 May 1931; Altenburg, Germany
- Died: 19 October 2020 (aged 89)
- Website: edithaltman.com

Edith Altman (23 May 1931 – 19 October 2020) was a German Jewish-American artist. She emigrated from Germany to the United States at a young age. Her work investigated the lowest and the highest levels of any hierarchy. She explored systems (governmental, financial, cultural, etc.) of power, and the powerless. Altman is "a student of Jewish mysticism", which has influenced her work.

== Biography ==
Edith Altman was born in Altenburg, Germany on 23 May 1931. She escaped the Nazi regime in 1938 as a little girl and emigrated to Chicago, Illinois. Her father, Max Hittman (Markus Hüttmann), escaped from Buchwenwald, where he had been imprisoned since 1938. She lost her grandfathers and grandmothers on both sides of her family to the Holocaust. In 1981 she attended Wayne State University in Detroit, Michigan, and was a resident at the University of Nebraska Omaha (UNO) Art Gallery for the term of one month. Her work is in the Museum of Contemporary Art, Chicago (MCA). She resides in the Chicago area. Altman died on 19 October 2020, at the age of 89.

== Influences ==
Altman's work is deeply influenced by both her experience as a Holocaust survivor and her Jewish faith. In her secular work, she places an emphasis on remembering the Holocaust as a central theme.

== Notable works ==
- Reclaiming the Symbol: The Art of Memory (p. 1988) – a painting that attempts to reclaim the symbolism of the swastika and incorporates themes including kabbalism and Jewish mysticism. In the same work, she has also tried to reclaim the triangle, also expropriated by that hated regime for the purpose of sorting prisoners, for what she sees as its "original purpose" – part of the Star of David imagery.
- When We Are Born, We Are Given a Golden Tent, and All of Life is the Folding and Unfolding of the Tent (p. 1986) – a performance piece that included a tent made of canvas that was painted gold and contained silhouettes of both the artist and her father. The piece traveled to a number of exhibits in both the United States and Europe where Altman met with various people of different nationalities and religions as a religious healing experience and to face the pain of the shared experience of the Holocaust.
