= Altman (automobile) =

Defunct American motor vehicle manufacturer

The Altman was an early automobile produced in 1901 in Cleveland, Ohio, by Henry J. Altman. Altman built the car at his home at 11 Pier Street, with his wife helping assemble the radiator in the kitchen. The car featured a two-cylinder engine suspended midship under the seat. In 1909 Altman converted the tonneau body to a roadster before selling the car to a local paperhanger for $200. Whether Altman built more cars is unknown.
