= Andreas Altmann =

Austrian economist

Andreas Altmann (born 20 June 1963 in Obertrum) is an Austrian economist.

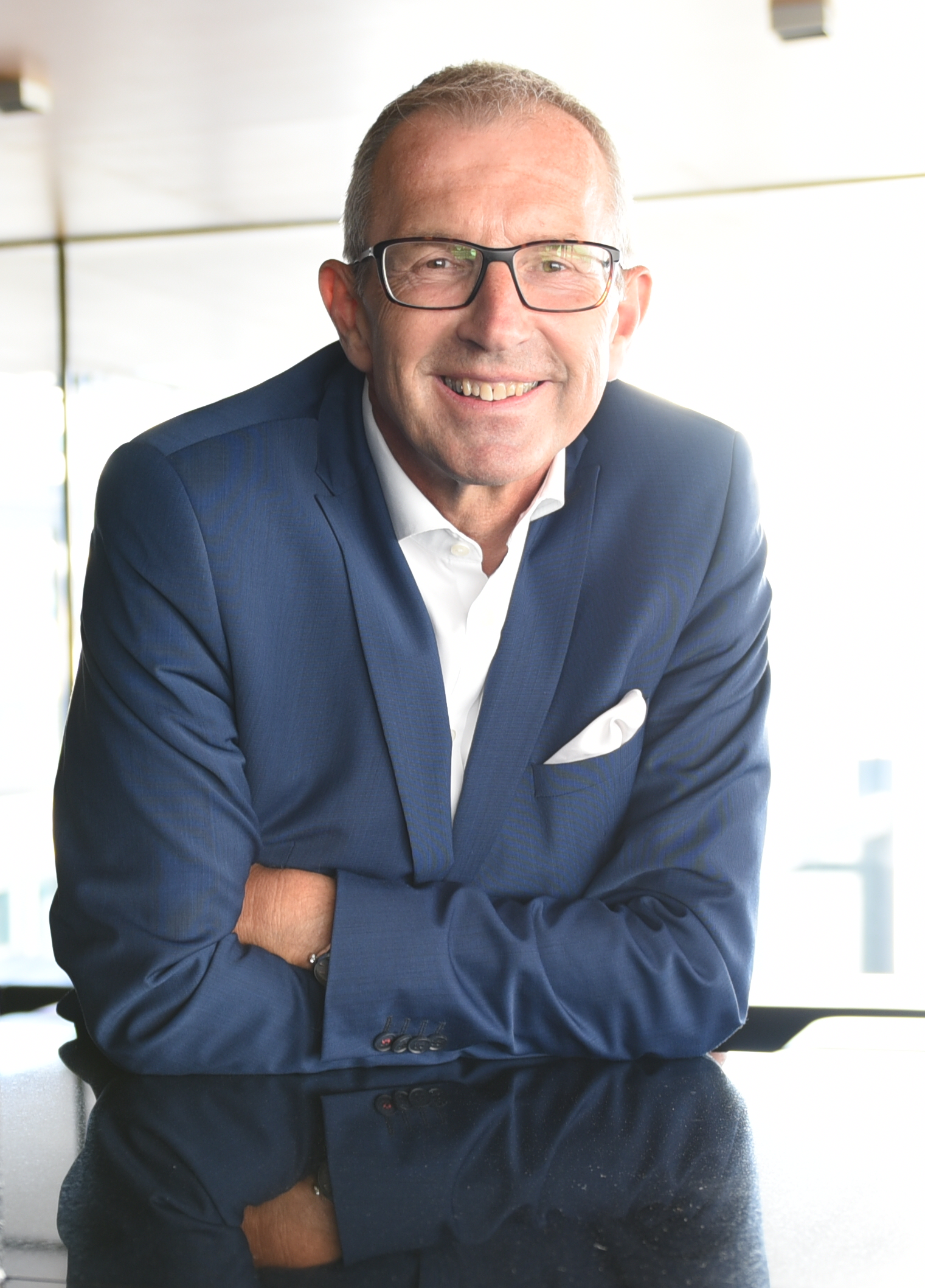
Andreas Altmann, Frühjahr 2020

== Life ==
Andreas Altmann studied Business Administration and Economics at Johannes Kepler University Linz and Leopold-Franzens-Universität Innsbruck and International Relations at the Johns Hopkins University in Bologna.

Having received his doctoral degree in Public Finance from the University of Innsbruck, Andreas Altmann embarked on his academic career as a postdoctoral researcher first at the Department of Public Finance and later on at the Department of Strategic Management.

There he got involved building up a new school from scratch, now known as MCI Management Center Innsbruck – The Entrepreneurial School®, under the umbrella of the University of Innsbruck, the Federal State of Tyrol, the City of Innsbruck, the Chamber of Commerce, the Chamber of Labor and the Association of Industrialists.

Andreas Altmann is married, has two children and is living in Innsbruck.

== Reception ==
Andreas Altmann's expertise is valued in a variety of boards, councils and bodies both in the academic and the business sector. Andreas Altmann's research, teaching and speaking activities mainly focus on management, innovation, governance and economic affairs in the higher education sector. He was awarded the Knight's Cross Österreichische Ehrenzeichen für Wissenschaft und Kunst by the Republic of Austria in 2013.
