= Elke Altmann =

German politician (born 1957)

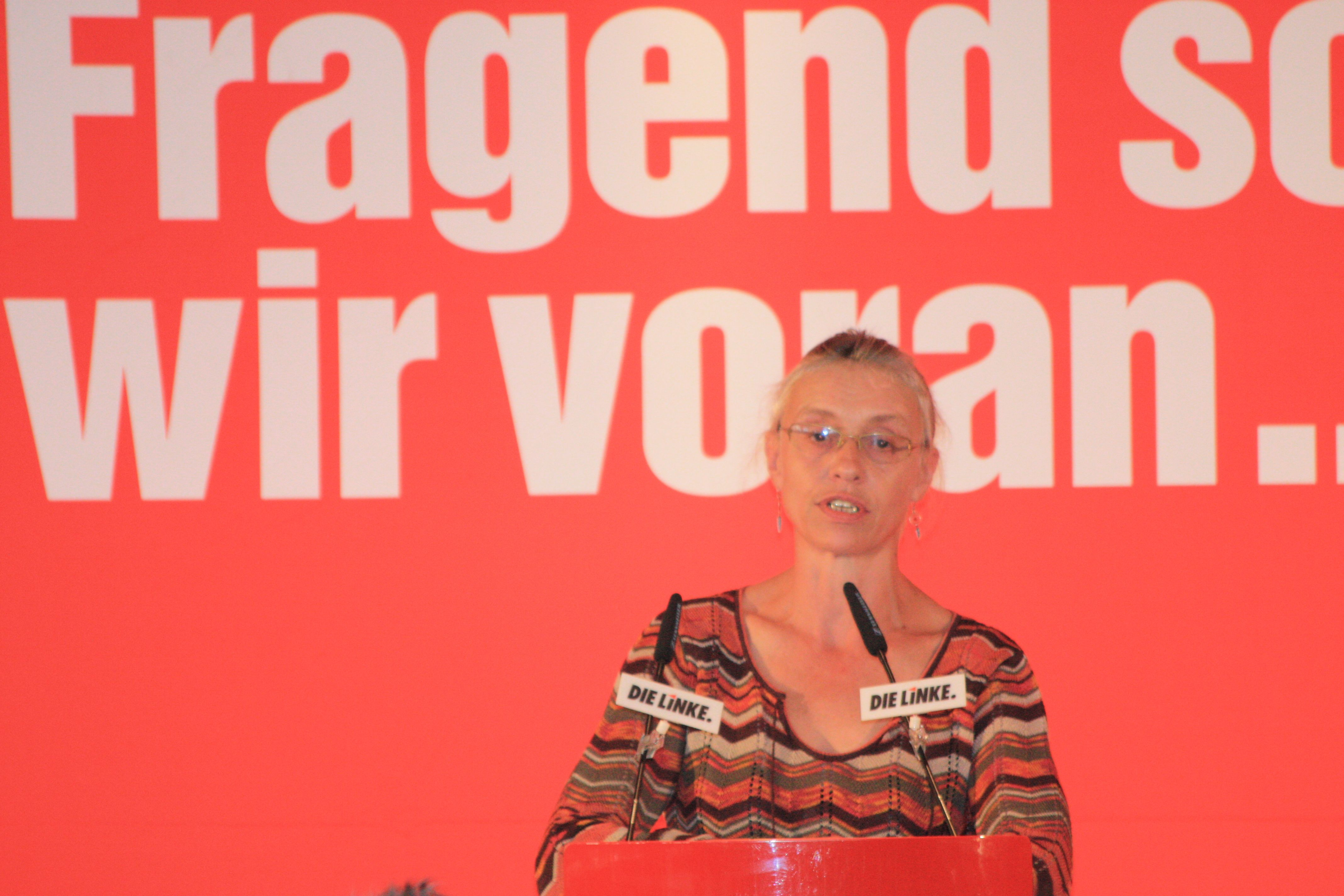
Elke Altmann

Elke Altmann (born 19 June 1957, Rostock, East Germany) is a German politician and member of the Left Party of Germany. From October 1999 until September 2009, she was a member of the Landtag of Saxony.

== Biography ==
In 1978, Altmann began an internship as an animal keeper at the St. Michaelis pig breeding facility. Subsequently, she studied animal husbandry at the Humboldt University of Berlin and the University of Rostock until 1983. Afterwards, from 1985 to 1988, she was deputy plant manager of the pig facility at St. Michaelis until she returned to school from 1990 to 1993 to study geriatric nursing. Following this, from 1993 to 1999, she worked in outpatient services. Altmann is mother to five children.

== Politics ==
Beginning in 1976, Altmann was a member of the Socialist Unity Party of Germany (SED, for Sozialistische Einheitspartei Deutschlands) and later, she became a member of its successor party, the Party for Democratic Socialism (PDS, for Partei des Demokratischen Sozialismus). As a member of the PDS, she served on the city council of Brand-Erbisdorf from 1992 to 2003. From June 2004, she was a City Councillor for the PDS in Freiberg. In October 1999 she became a member of the Landtag of Saxony, in which she was a member of the Committee for the Environment and for Agriculture. In 1999 and 2004, she ran as a direct candidate for the first electoral district of Freiberg, and was also included on her party's statewide list of candidates. Following the 2009 state elections in Saxony, she lost her mandate and was forced to leave the parliament.
