= Nico Jungmann =

Dutch painter

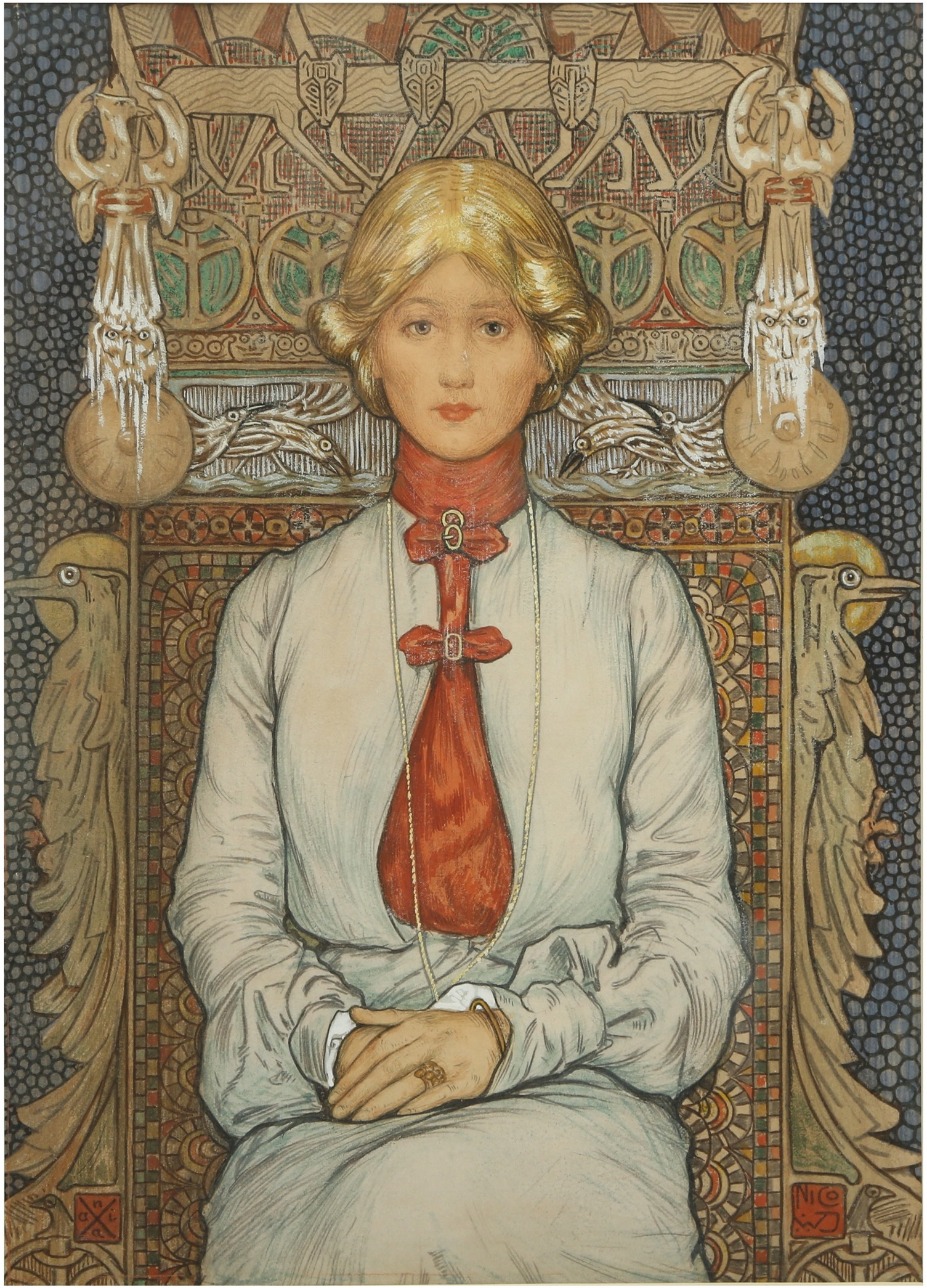
Norwegian Maiden, original painting for an illustration to Norway, 1905

Nicolaas Wilhelm Jungmann (in England frequently spelled Jungman; 5 February 1872 – 14 August 1935) was an Anglo-Dutch painter of landscapes and figural subjects, a book-illustrator and decorator.

== Life ==
Jungmann was born in Amsterdam, where he was apprenticed to a church painter, and studied at the Rijksakademie. He came to London around 1893 on a scholarship and became a naturalised British subject, returning to the Netherlands frequently, to paint in Volendam. In 1900, Jungmann married Beatrix Mackay with whom he had three children, Loyd, Zita (1903-2006) and Teresa (nicknamed "Baby") (1907-2010). As a naturalised Briton, he was interned by German forces in the Ruhleben internment camp during the First World War, which led eventually to the dissolution of his marriage.

Jungmann made several painting excursions to Brittany and Holland with his friend and fellow-painter Charles W. Bartlett. He illustrated topographical books on Holland (1904) and Norway (1905) for which his wife Beatrix wrote the text, as well as one on Normandy (1905) with a text by Geraldine Edith Mitton. He died, aged 63, in London.

== Illustrations for Norway, 1905 ==
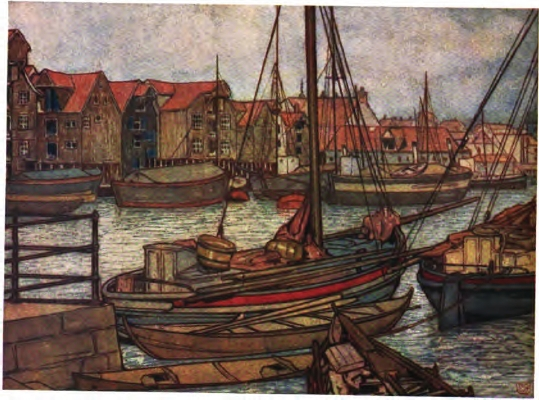
’Illustration of Bergen’, painting by Nico Wilhelm Jungmann, 1905

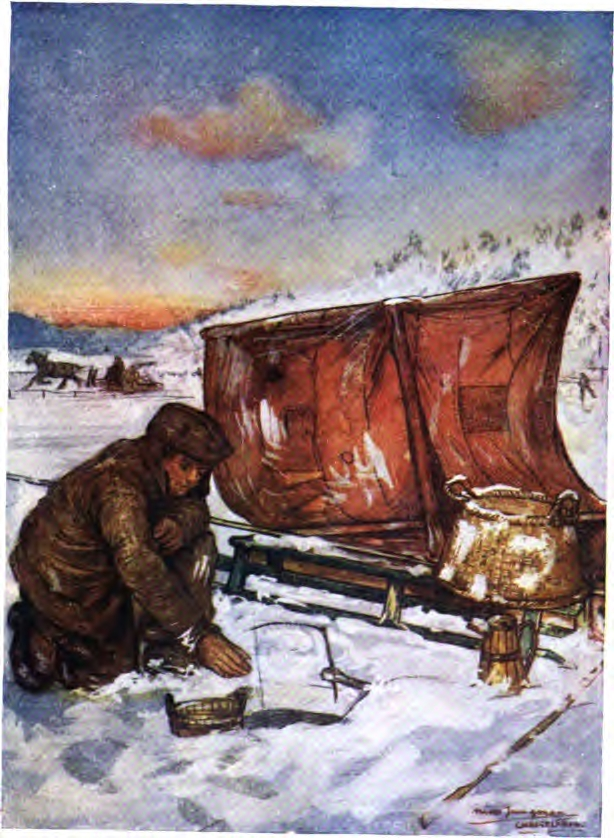
’Illustration of Ice Fishing in Norway’, painting by Nico Wilhelm Jungmann, 1904

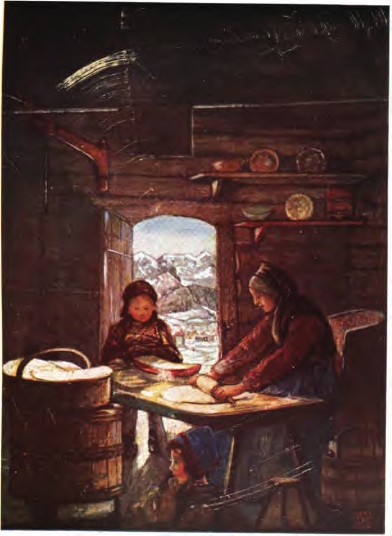
’Making Flatbread’ painting by Nico Wilhelm Jungmann, 1904

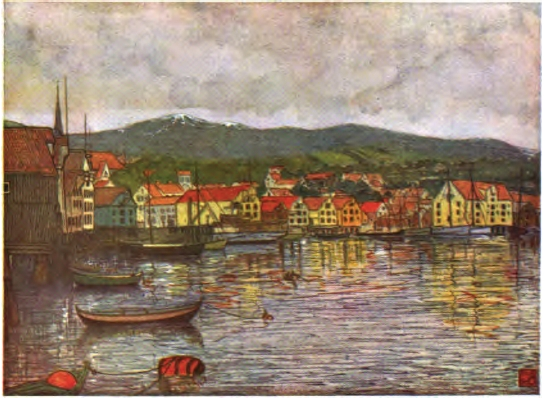
’Illustration of Molde’, painting by Nico Wilhelm Jungmann, 1904

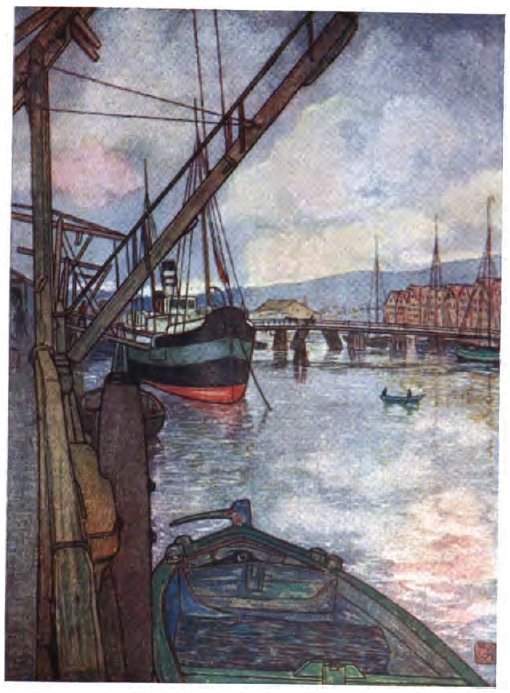
’Illustration of Trondheim’, painting by Nico Wilhelm Jungmann, 1904

== Beatrix ==
After their divorce in 1918, Beatrix remarried to become the second wife (or third wife, counting an annulment) of Richard Guinness (1873-1949) from the banking branch of the Guinness family. She stood godmother in 1931 to the infant Patrick Guinness (1931-1965), son of her husband's nephew Thomas "Loel" Guinness and his first wife Hon Joan Yarde-Buller (later Pss Aly Khan).

His daughters Zita and Teresa became famous as two of the original "Bright Young People" in the 1920s, and both lived to 102. Teresa married Graham Cuthbertson in 1940 and had two children, Penelope and Richard.

== Gallery: Ruhleben Prison Camp ==
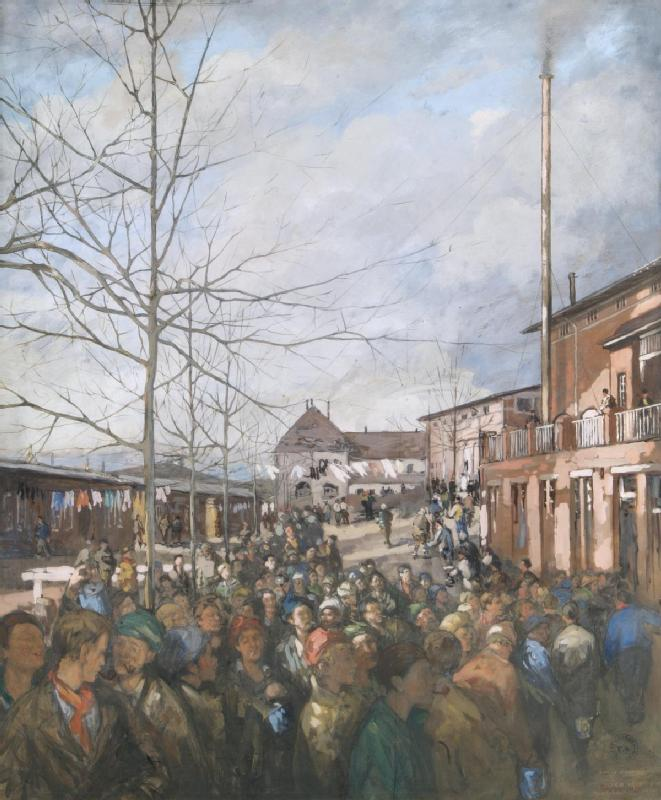
Ruhleben Prison Camp (1917)

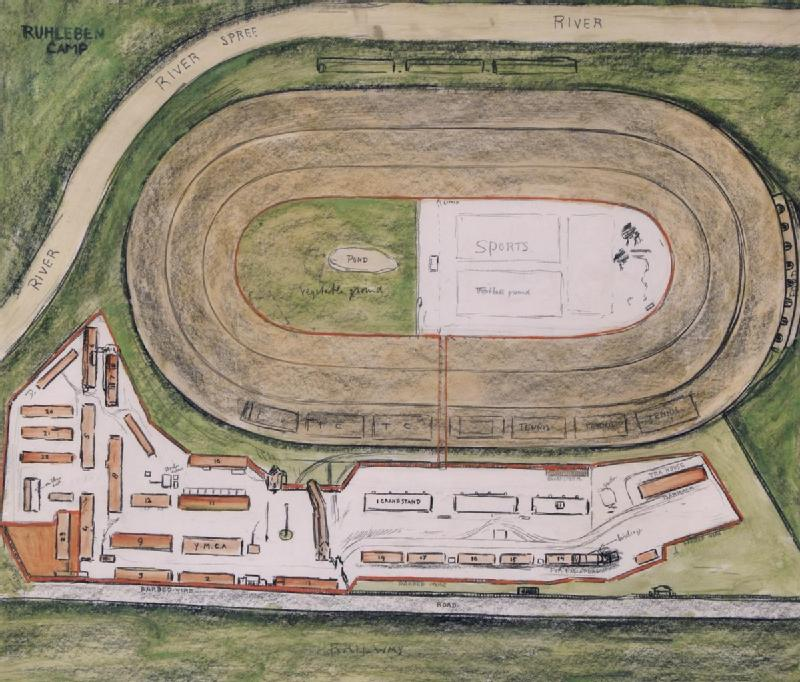
Ruhleben - Plan

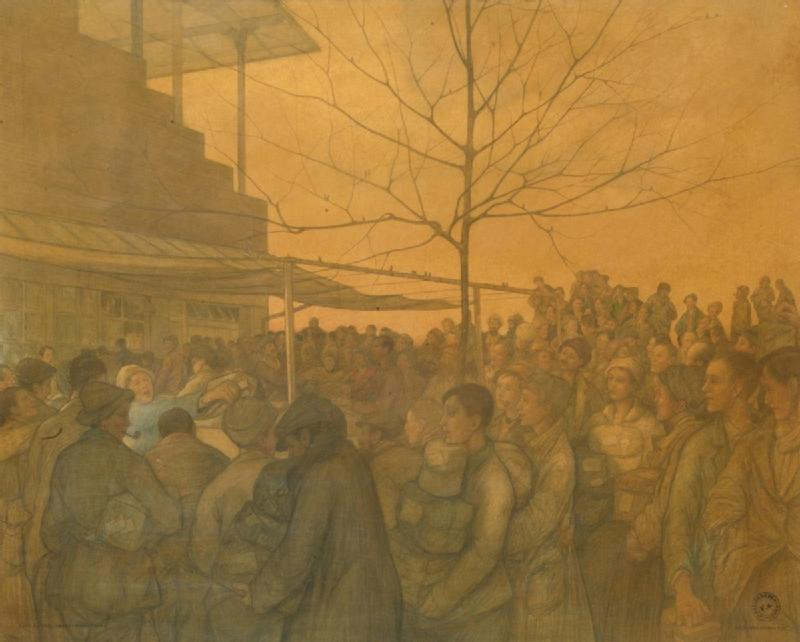
Distribution of parcels

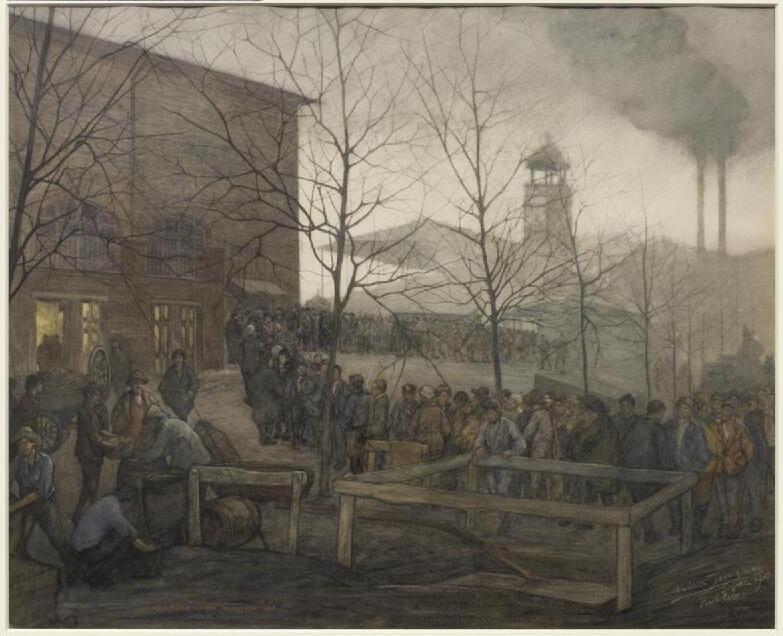
Queue for bread (1916)
