= Karl Altmann (painter) =

German painter

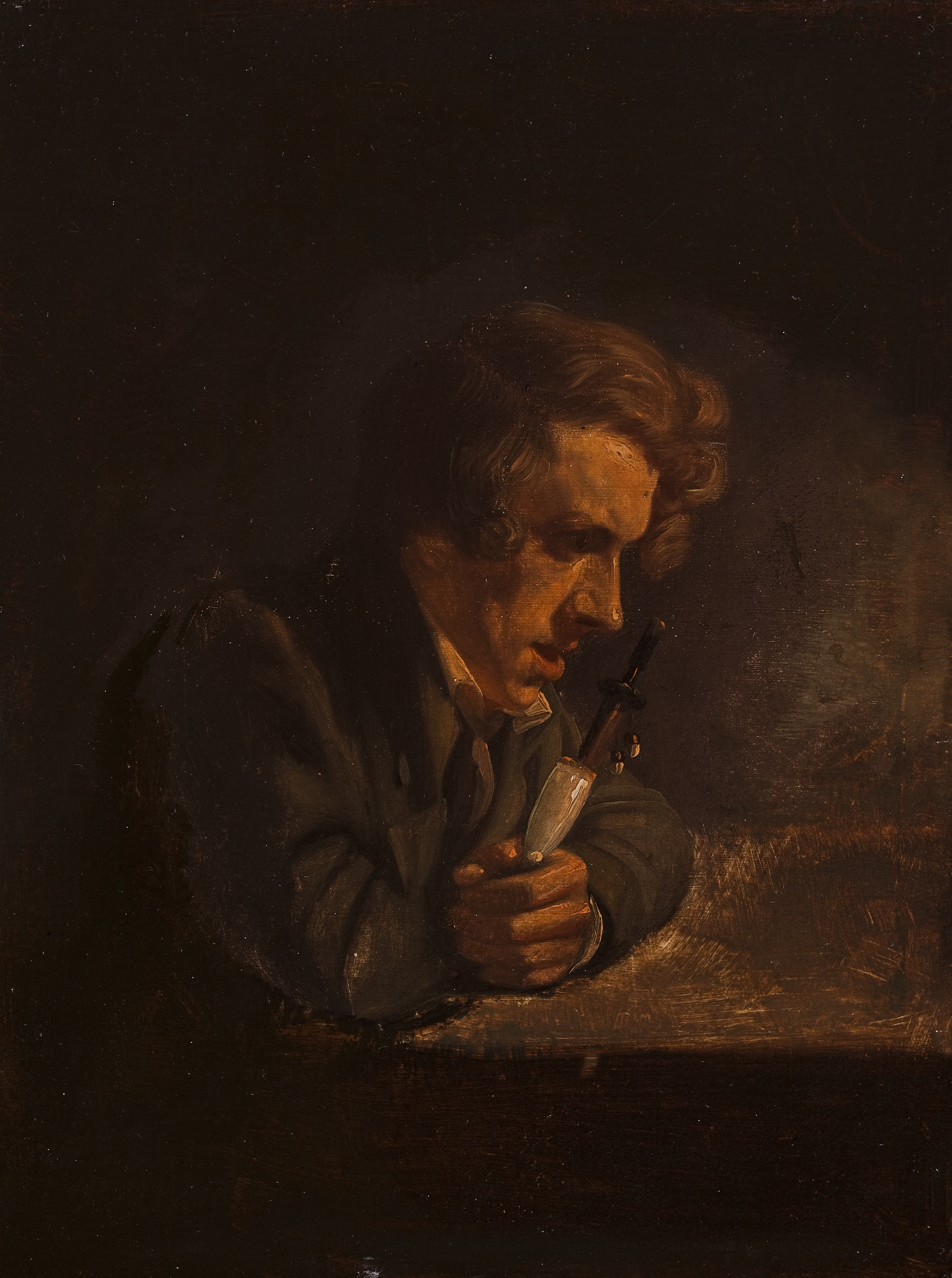
- Portrait of Altmann
- Born: 13 January 1802; Feuchtwangen, Kingdom of Bavaria
- Died: 11 January 1861 (aged 58); Munich, Kingdom of Bavaria
- Known for: Painting
- Movement: Realism

Karl Altmann (13 January 1802 – 11 January 1861) was a German painter.

The son of Joseph Altmann, he was born in Feuchtwangen and grew up in Ansbach. He studied painting in Munich and then at the Arts Academy Dresden, visited Italy, and settled down in Munich. It is traced, that he lived at Lerchen Straße 43 in Munich around 1850.

Altmann's oil paintings show scenes of alpine life, robbers, poachers, smugglers, folk festivals and other topics. He also painted still lifes. His works belong to national and international collections of established galleries.

== See also ==
- List of German painters
