= Rick Altman =

American academic

Rick Altman (born 1945) is an American academic who is a professor of cinema and comparative literature in the Department of Cinema and Comparative Literature, University of Iowa, Iowa City, United States. He has also published under the name Charles F. Altman. He created the Living Nickelodeon program and toured around the world in 2009-2010.

For his work published in 1999, Altman was the winner of the Society for Cinema Studies Katherine S. Kovacs prize for the best film book. He was also the runner up for many other awards for his Silent Film Sound.
