= John Altmann =

Australian rules footballer

Personal information
- Full name: John Henry Altmann
- Born: 8 December 1916; Beech Forest, Victoria
- Died: 16 April 1983 (aged 66); Fitzroy, Victoria
- Original team: Newtown & Chilwell
- Height: 180 cm (5 ft 11 in)
- Weight: 81 kg (179 lb)

Playing career^{1}
| Years | Club | Games (Goals) |
| 1944 | Geelong | 3 (0) |
- ^{1} Playing statistics correct to the end of 1944.

John Henry Altmann (8 December 1916 – 16 April 1983) was an Australian rules footballer who played with Geelong in the Victorian Football League (VFL).

Altmann played three games for Geelong in 1944, while serving in the Royal Australian Air Force during World War II.
