= Karl Altmann (politician) =

Austrian politician (1904–1960)

Karl Altmann (8 January 1904 - 29 December 1960) was an Austrian official and politician of the Communist Party of Austria. He was senate councilor of the Municipality of Vienna.

After the end of the Second World War in 1945 he became Undersecretary of Justice in the Provisional Government of Karl Renner.

From 20 December 1945 to 20 November 1947 he was Federal Minister for Electrification and Energy (Figl I government).

He was the husband of Helene Postranecky.
