= Winthrop Pickard Bell =

Canadian academic (1884–1965)

Winthrop Pickard Bell (May 12, 1884 – April 4, 1965) was a Canadian academic who taught philosophy at the University of Toronto and Harvard. He was best known for his work as a historian of Nova Scotia until his work as a spy for MI6 was uncovered. In 1939, Bell published the first major warning of the Holocaust in English.

== Biography ==
Winthrop Bell was born in Halifax, Nova Scotia and educated at Mount Allison University, McGill University, and Harvard University where he studied under Josiah Royce. He traveled to Germany and attended the University of Leipzig and finally the University of Göttingen, which is where he completed his doctoral studies under Edmund Husserl. Bell wrote his doctoral dissertation about Royce's theory of knowledge.

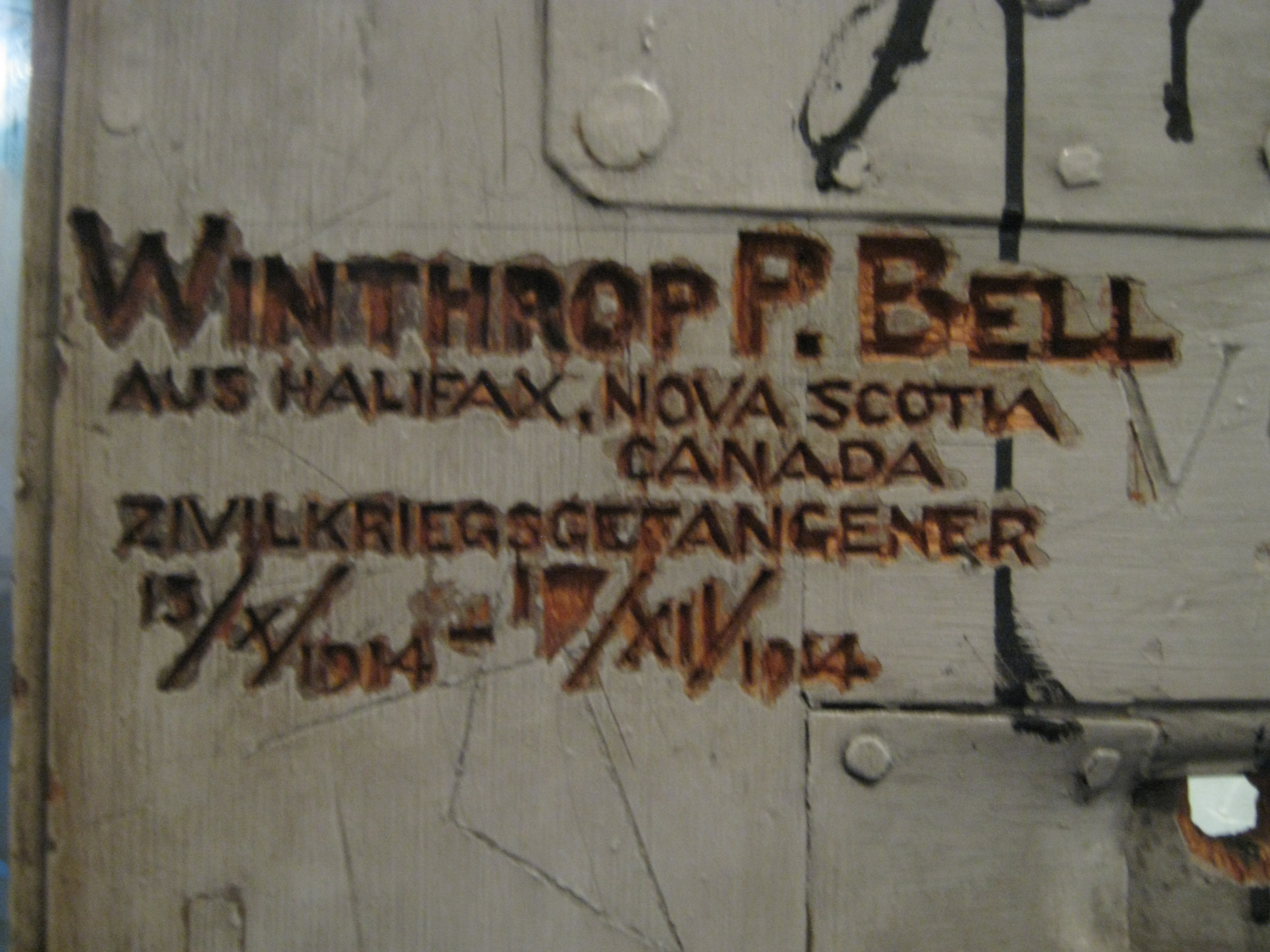
Engraving by Winthrop P. Bell on a cell-door in the Karzer of Göttingen University

Edith Stein was among his friends during his Göttingen period.

During the First World War he was held in the civilian internment camp at Ruhleben, near Berlin, for more than three years. After the war, he gave talks about his experiences as a prisoner and warned that the terms of peace were too steep for Germans to survive. MI6 recruited, trained, and returned him to Germany as a spy.

In 1920, Bell returned to North America to teach at Harvard University. He also taught at University of Toronto. He entered the private sector in 1927.

In his latter years he focused his energies on historical research, much of which concerned the group of mid-18th-Century immigrants to Nova Scotia known as the "Foreign Protestants". His most notable book was The "Foreign Protestants" and the Settlement of Nova Scotia, which was published by the University of Toronto Press in 1961. His Register of the Foreign Protestants of Nova Scotia was published some years after his death.

== Spy career ==
While researching his philosophy dissertation in 2008, Jason Bell (no relation) consulted Winthrop Bell's archive at Mount Allison University. They were closed to previous researchers. He was shocked to find the archive full of Winthrop's dispatches from his years as a spy. Jason wrote a biography of Winthrop's career called Cracking the Nazi Code.

During the interview phase of Winthrop Bell's recruitment, Canadian Prime Minister Robert Borden invited him to dinner at Claridge's on December 3, 1918. Bell gave Borden his view of the German situation. By December 9, he was informally a Canadian agent and briefing intelligence agencies at Whitehall. In late January 1919, Bell met with Mansfield Smith-Cumming and officially became an MI6 agent, with Canada underwriting the cost of his employment. He returned to Germany on February 21, 1919.

Winthrop Bell's professional cover was as a Reuters reporter, and he filed many news stories that were syndicated in English media. At the same time, he was filing reports to MI6 and penetrating deeply into post-war Germany's complicated political factions. He witnessed the military fighting between them and noted how dangerous the Freikorps were to stability. He found the demoralized Prussian officers, such as Achim von Arnim to be great sources.

Bell pleaded with his superiors to ameliorate the Treaty of Versailles knowing how volatile the German state was. He was instrumental in helping the Allies of World War I understand how desperate the situation was in Germany in 1919. He personally briefed UK Prime Minister David Lloyd George and Robert Borden on the same day during the Paris Peace Conference.

In July 1919, he was sent to Upper Silesia where he reported that tensions were extremely high. Bell warned, "every day incidents occur showing how imminent is the danger of an outburst which would lead to the fiercest and bloodiest kind of civil war." A month later, Bell's prediction took the form of the First Silesian Uprising. When he returned to Berlin, Bell found it "in the throes of a great strike and a sinister political background. It might not take much to overthrow the Government but what would follow only the Gods know."

In the fall of 1919, Bell was able to warn the United Kingdom about the October 1919 attack on Riga. The Freikorps allied with the Russians in the assault. Bell worked to insure that the UK could win the battle and not overreact to the labyrinthian scheme of German reactionaries.

Bell left Germany on November 4, 1919, and returned to London. He spent the rest of the year warning about the rising threat in Germany. Bell had seen how dangerous the radical Germans were and how obsessed they were with Jews. He consolidated his jeremiad into a book, Report on the Condition in Germany, and asked permission to publish it commercially. The Foreign Office refused. He retired as a spy and taught philosophy at Harvard before going into the private sector.

=== Return to Germany ===
Winthrop Bell resumed his espionage career in 1934. This time, he took his wife Hazel with him on a trip that began on June 26 in Antwerp. Traveling as a businessman, Winthrop went to Cologne, where he met his friend Edith Stein. He also visited his old advisor Edmund Husserl at the end of the trip. They traveled onto Göttingen, where they began an 18-day trip with Wilhelm Runge who had been an intelligence asset for Bell during his first stint as a spy.

At Telefunken, Runge was in charge of radar research. He told Bell that he was engaged in an elaborate sabotage plot to thwart German advances in radar. Before it was classified, he published their research to make sure the entire world had access to German technology and eliminated the Nazi's advantage. He also slowed progress by creating two separate radar research tracks, one within Telefunken under Hermann Göring's purview and the other under the navy.

When the great advance of centimetre wave radar neared, Runge lied that it was impractical and insured that research was defunded in 1942. In February 1943, when the Germans shot down a British Stirling bomber they were shocked to realize it had functioning centimetric radar. Heinrich Himmler demanded an investigation after several engineers at Telefunken became suspicious. Runge was able to convince Göring that his team's inability to develop the technology was due to incompetence. Moreover, he bluffed Göring that British submarines could not possibly be using centimetric radar. Göring never told his counterparts in the German Navy about the discovery. Meanwhile, the Royal Navy were in fact using the new technology and devastating the U-boat fleet.

== Holocaust warning ==
When Bell read Mein Kampf in 1939, he realized that Hitler meant exactly what he said in the book. He wrote an essay saying the Nazis were bent on exterminating non-Aryans around the world. He finished the essay by April 6, but no one would print it. When Hitler invaded Poland, five months after Bell wrote his warning, Saturday Night finally agreed to publish it. Bell revised his essay, and it was published in two installments: "Exterminate Non-Germans, Dogma of 'Mein Kampf'" (November 25) and "Hitler's Extermination Policy is World-Wide" (December 2).

Part one begins with British astonishment at Hitler's violation of the Munich Agreement by invading Czechoslovakia on March 15. Because the Nazis had repeatedly said they had no interest ruling over territory with "Czechs, Poles, and non-Germans", there was widespread confusion over the inherent contradiction in seizing Czech land. Bell points out that there is no contradiction if you take Hitler at his own word. He instructs readers to ignore Hitler's speeches, because they are rife with inconsistencies. Bell focuses on Mein Kampf's theme of expanding Germany to create lebensraum and closely reads Hitler's plans for how conquered territory will be managed: exclusively by Germans. He concludes, "Germany is to conquer huge stretches of territory now inhabited by non-Germans, but at the same time the enlarged German Reich is not to include any non-Germans in its population, because Hitler proposes that those existing populations shall be, quite literally, exterminated."

In part two, Bell presses his point by quoting Hitler's aspiration to "take up where we left off six hundred years ago". Unlike medieval Germans, who interbred with their captives, Hitler rails at length against such admixture. Bell also turns Hitler's interpretation of Germany's "slow execution" under the Treaty of Versailles into a prescription for Nazi treatment of conquered lands. Hitler writes, "A clever victor will as far as possible impose his requirements upon the vanquished bit by bit," and he invokes the extermination of Carthage as a model. Bell predicted that Hitler would "arrange the stages of the 'gradual execution' as to mask its real nature as long as possible not only from the victims but also from the rest of the world." He presciently concludes that "isolation" from Hitler's policy is impossible".
