= Radar in World War II =

The use of the Radar in World War II greatly influenced many important aspects of the conflict. This revolutionary new technology of radio-based detection and tracking was used by both the Allies and Axis powers in World War II, which had evolved independently in a number of nations during the mid 1930s. At the outbreak of war in September 1939, both the United Kingdom and Germany had functioning radar systems. In the UK, it was called RDF, Range and Direction Finding, while in Germany the name Funkmeß (radio-measuring) was used, with apparatuses called Funkmessgerät (radio measuring device). By the time of the Battle of Britain in mid-1940, the Royal Air Force (RAF) had fully integrated RDF as part of the national air defense.

In the United States, the technology was demonstrated during December 1934. However, it was only when war became likely that the U.S. recognized the potential of the new technology, and began the development of ship- and land-based systems. The U.S. Navy fielded the first of these in early 1940, and a year later by the U.S. Army. The acronym RADAR (for Radio Detection And Ranging) was coined by the U.S. Navy in 1940, and the term "radar" became widely used.

While the benefits of operating in the microwave portion of the radio spectrum were known, transmitters for generating microwave signals of sufficient power were unavailable; thus, all early radar systems operated at lower frequencies (e.g., HF or VHF). In February 1940, Great Britain developed the resonant-cavity magnetron, capable of producing microwave power in the kilowatt range, opening the path to second-generation radar systems.

After the Fall of France, Britain realized that the manufacturing capabilities of the United States were vital to success in the war; thus, although America was not yet a belligerent, Prime Minister Winston Churchill directed that Britain's technological secrets be shared in exchange for the needed capabilities. In the summer of 1940, the Tizard Mission visited the United States. The cavity magnetron was demonstrated to Americans at RCA, Bell Labs, etc. It was 100 times more powerful than anything they had seen. Bell Labs was able to duplicate the performance, and the Radiation Laboratory at MIT was established to develop microwave radars. The magnetron was later described by American military scientists as "the most valuable cargo ever brought to our shores".

In addition to Britain, Germany, and the United States, wartime radars were also developed and used by Australia, Canada, France, Italy, Japan, New Zealand, South Africa, the Soviet Union, and Sweden.

== United Kingdom ==
Research leading to RDF technology in the United Kingdom was begun by Sir Henry Tizard's Aeronautical Research Committee in early 1935, responding to the urgent need to anticipate German bomber attacks. Robert A. Watson-Watt at the Radio Research Station, Slough, was asked to investigate a radio-based "death ray". In response, Watson-Watt and his scientific assistant, Arnold F. Wilkins, replied that it might be more practical to use radio to detect and track enemy aircraft. On 26 February 1935, a preliminary test, commonly called the Daventry Experiment, showed that radio signals reflected from an aircraft could be detected. Research funds were quickly allocated, and a development project was started in great secrecy on the Orford Ness Peninsula in Suffolk. E. G. Bowen was responsible for developing the pulsed transmitter. On 17 June 1935, the research apparatus successfully detected an aircraft at a distance of 17 miles. In August, A. P. Rowe, representing the Tizard Committee, suggested the technology be code-named RDF, meaning Range and Direction Finding.

=== Air Ministry ===
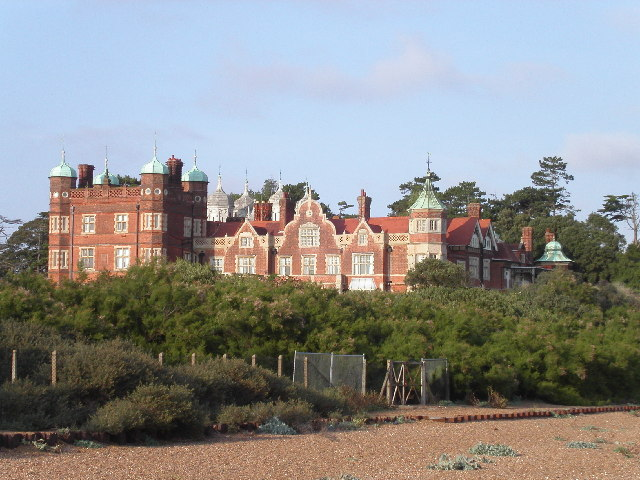
Bawdsey Manor

In March 1936, the RDF research and development effort was moved to the Bawdsey Research Station located at Bawdsey Manor in Suffolk.

At Bawdsey, engineers and scientists evolved the RDF technology, but Watson-Watt, the head of the team, turned from the technical side to developing a practical machine/human user interface. After watching a demonstration in which operators were attempting to locate an "attacking" bomber, he noticed that the primary problem was not technological, but information management and interpretation. Following Watson-Watt's advice, by early 1940, the RAF had built up a layered control organization that efficiently passed information along the chain of command, and was able to track large numbers of aircraft and direct interceptors to them.

Immediately after the war began in September 1939, the Air Ministry RDF development at Bawdsey was temporarily relocated to University College, Dundee in Scotland. A year later, the operation moved to near Worth Matravers in Dorset on the southern coast of England, and was named the Telecommunications Research Establishment (TRE). In a final move, the TRE relocated to Malvern College in Great Malvern.

Some of the major RDF/radar equipment used by the Air Ministry is briefly described. All of the systems were given the official designation Air Ministry Experimental Station (AMES) plus a Type number; most of these are listed in this link.

==== Chain Home ====
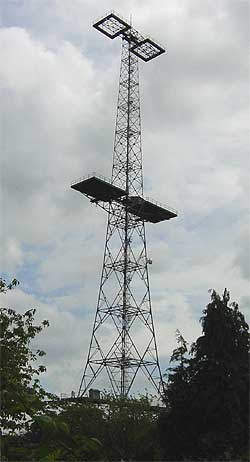
Chain Home tower at Great Baddow in Essex

In 1936, following the success of the prototype Chain Home (CH) station in Bawdsey, five initial stations were built in Canewdon, Dover, Dunkirk, and High Street in Suffolk. The transmitting arrays were strung between 360 foot steel towers, with platforms at 50, 200 and 350 feet. Horizontal dipole arrays with reflector elements provided a "floodlight" radiation pattern 60 degrees wide in four selected frequencies between 20 and 55 MHz. Peak power was 200 kilowatt, with a pulse duration of 5 to 25 microseconds. Four 240 foot wooden receiver towers included crossed dipole antennas at the 95 and 215 foot level for low-level targets, while antennas at the 45 and 95 foot levels were for high elevations. An operator could select four frequencies between 20 and 50 MHz. Adjacent stations provided overlapping coverage. A goniometer helped identify and position multiple targets. CD Mk II systems were then modified to detect low-flying aircraft, creating Chain Home Low (CHL). By 1939, CH stations provided radar coverage from Aberdeen to Southampton. During the Battle of Britain, CH and CHL alerted Ground-controlled interception stations.

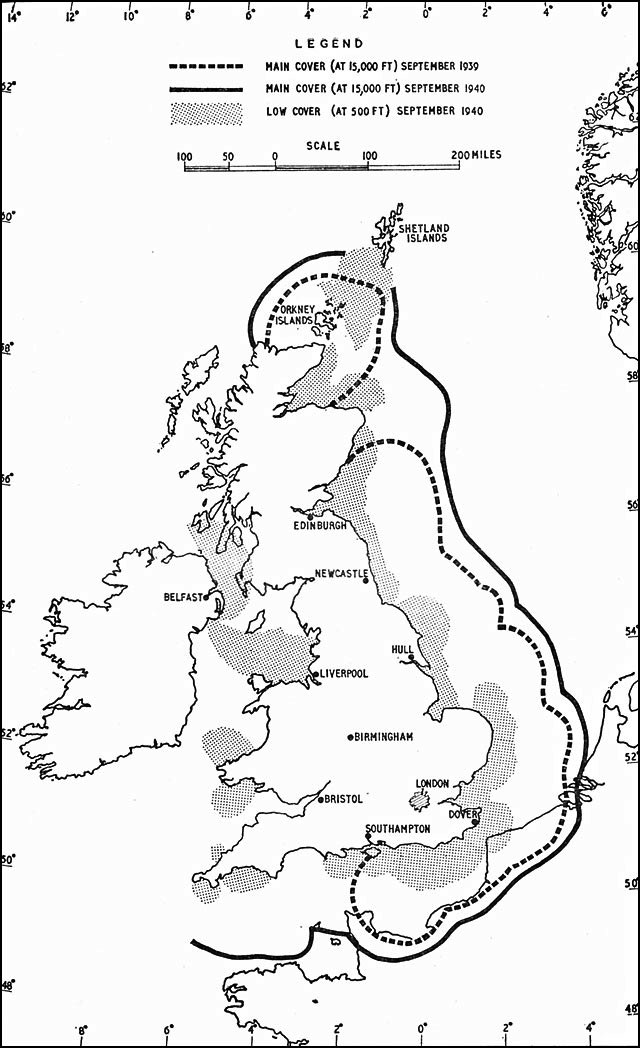
Chain Home coverage

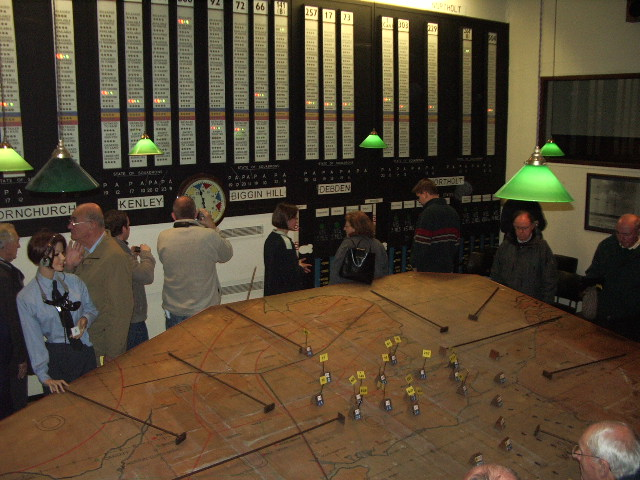
Battle of Britain operations room at RAF Uxbridge

==== Ground-Controlled Intercept ====
Battle of Britain defences of the UK

In 1940, systems similar to 1.5 meter CHL were adapted to produce the Ground-Controlled Intercept (GCI). In January 1941, they became operational, and used an antenna rotated mechanically over a hemisphere to track target and interceptor simultaneously. A CRT map display was added, called plan position indicators (PPI), which rotated with the antenna.

Philo Taylor Farnsworth refined a version of his picture tube (cathode ray tube, or CRT) and called it an "Iatron". It could store an image for milliseconds to minutes (even hours). One version that kept an image alive about a second before fading, proved to be a useful addition to the evolution of radar. This slow-to-fade display tube was used by air traffic controllers from the very beginning of radar.

==== Aircraft Intercept ====
In 1936, Edward George Bowen, developed an RDF system suitable for aircraft, overcoming the limitations associated with CH, especially directing interceptors at night or inclement weather. The aircraft interception radar Watson-Watt called RDF-2A, since CH was RDF-1. Initial AI sets were first made available to the RAF in 1939 and fitted to night fighter Bristol Blenheims.

Later in the war, British Mosquito night intruder aircraft were fitted with AI Mk VIII and later derivatives, which with Serrate allowed them to track down German night fighters from their Lichtenstein signal emissions, as well as a device named Perfectos that tracked German IFF. As a countermeasure, the German night fighters employed Naxos ZR radar signal detectors.

==== Air-to-surface-vessel radar ====
While testing the AI radars near Bawdsey Manor, Bowen's team noticed the radar generated strong returns from ships and docks. This was due to the vertical sides of the objects, which formed excellent partial corner reflectors, allowing detection at several miles range. The team focussed on this application for much of 1938.

In 1939, the Air-to-surface-vessel (ASV) Mark I, using electronics similar to those of the AI Mk II, was able to spot vessels in the English Channel, including submarines. In 1940, the system was improved with the ASV Mk. II radar.

==== Centimetric ====
The improvements to the cavity magnetron by John Randall and Harry Boot of Birmingham University in early 1940 marked a major advance in radar capability. The resulting magnetron was a small device that generated high-power microwave frequencies and allowed the development of practical centimetric radar that operated in the SHF radio frequency band from 3 to 30 GHz (wavelengths of 10 to 1 cm). Centimetric radar enables the detection of much smaller objects and the use of much smaller antennas than the earlier, lower frequency radars. A radar with a wavelength of 2 meters (VHF band, 150 MHz) cannot detect objects that are much smaller than 2 meters and requires an antenna whose size is on the order of 2 meters (an awkward size for use on aircraft). In contrast, a radar with a 10 cm wavelength can detect objects 10 cm in size with a reasonably sized antenna.

In addition a tuneable local oscillator and a mixer for the receiver were essential. These were targeted developments, the former by R W Sutton who developed the NR89 reflex klystron, or "Sutton tube". The latter by H W B Skinner who developed the 'cat's whisker' crystal.

At the end of 1939 when the decision was made to develop 10 cm radar, there were no suitable active devices available - no high power magnetron, no reflex klystron, no proven microwave crystal mixer, and no TR cell. By mid-1941, Type 271, the first Naval S-band radar, was in operational use.

The cavity magnetron was perhaps the single most important invention in the history of radar. In the Tizard Mission during September 1940, it was given free to the U.S., along with other inventions, such as jet technology, in exchange for American R&D and production facilities; the British urgently needed to produce the magnetron in large quantities. Edward George Bowen was attached to the mission as the RDF lead. This led to the creation of the Radiation Laboratory (Rad Lab) based at MIT to further develop the device and usage. Half of the radars deployed during World War II were designed at the Rad Lab, including over 100 different systems costing US$1.5 billion.

When the cavity magnetron was first developed, its use in microwave RDF sets was held up because the duplexers for VHF were destroyed by the new higher-powered transmitter. This problem was solved in early 1941 by the transmit-receive (T-R) switch developed at the Clarendon Laboratory of Oxford University, allowing a pulse transmitter and receiver to share the same antenna without affecting the receiver.

The combination of magnetron, T-R switch, small antenna and high resolution allowed small, powerful radars to be installed in aircraft. Maritime patrol aircraft could detect objects as small as submarine periscopes, allowing aircraft to track and attack submerged submarines, where before only surfaced submarines could be detected. However, according to the latest reports on the history U.S. Navy periscope detection the first minimal possibilities for periscope detection appeared only during 50's and 60's and the problem was not completely solved even on the turn of the millennium. In addition, radar could detect the submarine at a much greater range than visual observation, not only in daylight but at night, when submarines had previously been able to surface and recharge their batteries safely. Centimetric contour mapping radars such as H2S, and the even higher-frequency American-created H2X, allowed new tactics in the strategic bombing campaign. Centimetric gun-laying radars were much more accurate than older technology; radar improved Allied naval gunnery and, together with the proximity fuze, made anti-aircraft guns much more effective. The two new systems used by anti-aircraft batteries are credited with destroying many V-1 flying bombs in the late summer of 1944.

=== British Army ===
During Air Ministry RDF development in Bawdsey, an Army detachment was attached to initiate its own projects. These programmes were for a Gun Laying (GL) system to assist aiming antiaircraft guns and searchlights and a Coastal Defence (CD) system for directing coastal artillery. The Army detachment included W. A. S. Butement and P. E. Pollard who, in 1930, demonstrated a radio-based detection apparatus that was not further pursued by the Army.

When war started and Air Ministry activities were relocated to Dundee, the Army detachment became part of a new developmental centre at Christchurch in Dorset. John D. Cockcroft, a physicist from Cambridge University, who was awarded a Nobel Prize after the war for work in nuclear physics, became Director. With its greater remit, the facility became the Air Defence Research and Development Establishment (ADRDE) in mid-1941. A year later, the ADRDE relocated to Great Malvern, in Worcestershire. In 1944, this was redesignated the Radar Research and Development Establishment (RRDE).

==== Transportable Radio Unit ====
While at Bawdsey, the Army detachment developed a Gun Laying ("GL") system termed Transportable Radio Unit (TRU). Pollard was project leader. Operating at 60 MHz (6-m) with 50-kW power, the TRU had two vans for the electronic equipment and a generator van; it used a 105-ft portable tower to support a transmitting antenna and two receiving antennas. A prototype was tested in October 1937, detecting aircraft at 60-miles range; production of 400 sets designated GL Mk. I began in June 1938. The Air Ministry adopted some of these sets to augment the CH network in case of enemy damage.

GL Mk. I sets were used overseas by the British Army in Malta and Egypt in 1939–40. Seventeen sets were sent to France with the British Expeditionary Force; while most were destroyed at the Dunkirk evacuation in late May 1940, a few were captured intact, giving the Germans an opportunity to examine British RDF kit. An improved version, GL Mk. II, was used throughout the war; some 1,700 sets were put into service, including over 200 supplied to the Soviet Union. Operational research found that anti-aircraft guns using GL averaged 4,100 rounds fired per hit, compared with about 20,000 rounds for predicted fire using a conventional director.

==== Coastal Defence ====
In early 1938, Alan Butement began the development of a Coastal Defence (CD) system that involved some of the most advanced features in the evolving technology. The 200 MHz transmitter and receiver already being developed for the AI and ASV sets of the Air Defence were used, but, since the CD would not be airborne, more power and a much larger antenna were possible. Transmitter power was increased to 150 kW. A dipole array 10 feet (3.0 m) high and 24 feet (7.3 m) wide, was developed, giving much narrower beams and higher gain. This "broadside" array was rotated 1.5 revolutions per minute, sweeping a field covering 360 degrees. Lobe switching was incorporated in the transmitting array, giving high directional accuracy. To analyze system capabilities, Butement formulated the first mathematical relationship that later became the well-known "radar range equation".

Although initially intended for detecting and directing fire at surface vessels, early tests showed that the CD set had much better capabilities for detecting aircraft at low altitudes than the existing Chain Home. Consequently, CD was also adopted by the RAF to augment the CH stations; in this role, it was designated Chain Home Low (CHL).

==== Centimetric gun-laying ====
When the cavity magnetron became practicable, the ADEE cooperated with TRE in utilizing it in an experimental 10 cm GL set. This was first tested and found to be too fragile for army field use. The ADEE became the ADRDE in early 1941, and started the development of the GL3B. The system was housed on two trailers, each with 6-foot parabolic antennas. Similar microwave gun-laying systems were being developed in Canada (the GL3C) and in America (eventually designated SCR-584). Although about 400 of the GL3B sets were manufactured, it was the American version that was most numerous in the defense of London during the V-1 attacks, and in determining V-2 launch sites.

=== Royal Navy ===
The Experimental Department of His Majesty's Signal School (HMSS) had been present at early demonstrations of the work conducted at Orfordness and Bawdsey Manor. Located at Portsmouth in Hampshire, the Experimental Department had an independent capability for developing wireless valves (vacuum tubes), and had provided the tubes used by Bowden in the transmitter at Orford Ness. With excellent research facilities of its own, the Admiralty-based its RDF development at the HMSS. This remained in Portsmouth until 1942, when it was moved inland to safer locations at Witley and Haslemere in Surrey. These two operations became the Admiralty Signal Establishment (ASE).

A few representative radars are described. Note that the type numbers are not sequential by date.

==== Surface Warning/Gun Control ====
The Royal Navy's first successful RDF was the Type 79Y Surface Warning, tested at sea in early 1938. John D. S. Rawlinson was the project director. This 43-MHz (7-m), 70-kW set used fixed transmitting and receiving antennas and had a range of 30 to 50 miles, depending on the antenna heights. By 1940, this became the Type 281, increased in frequency to 85 MHz (3.5 m) and power to between 350 and 1,000 kW, depending on the pulse width. With steerable antennas, it was also used for Gun Control. This was first used in combat in the Battle of Cape Matapan with considerable success.

==== Air Search/Gunnery Director ====
In 1938, John F. Coales began the development of 600-MHz (50-cm) equipment. The higher frequency allowed narrower beams (needed for air search) and antennas more suitable for shipboard use. The first 50-cm set was Type 282. With 25-kW output and a pair of Yagi antennas incorporating lobe switching, it was trialed in June 1939. This set detected low-flying aircraft at 2.5 miles and ships at 5 miles. In early 1940, 200 sets were manufactured. To use the Type 282 as a rangefinder for the main armament, an antenna with a large cylindrical parabolic reflector and 12 dipoles was used. This set was designated Type 285 and had a range of 15 miles. Types 282 and Type 285 were used with Bofors 40 mm guns. Type 283 and Type 284 were other 50-cm gunnery director systems.

Type 289 was developed based upon Dutch pre-war radar technology and used a Yagi-antenna. With an improved RDF design it controlled Bofors 40 mm anti-aircraft guns (see Electric listening device).

==== Microwave Warning/Fire Control ====
The critical problem of submarine detection required RDF systems operating at higher frequencies than the existing sets because of a submarine's smaller physical size than most other vessels. When the first cavity magnetron was delivered to the TRE, a demonstration breadboard was built and demonstrated to the Admiralty. In early November 1940, a team from Portsmouth under S. E. A. Landale was set up to develop a 10-cm surface-warning set for shipboard use. In December, an experimental apparatus tracked a surfaced submarine at 13 miles range.

At Portsmouth, the team continued development, fitting antennas behind cylindrical parabolas (called "cheese" antennas) to generate a narrow beam that maintained contact as the ship rolled. Designated Type 271 radar, the set was tested in March 1941, detecting the periscope of a submerged submarine at almost a mile. The set was deployed in August 1941, just 12 months after the first apparatus was demonstrated. On November 16, the first German submarine was sunk after being detected by a Type 271.

The initial Type 271 primarily found service on smaller vessels. At ASE Witley, this set was modified to become Type 272 and Type 273 for larger vessels. Using larger reflectors, the Type 273 also effectively detected low-flying aircraft, with a range up to 30 miles. This was the first Royal Navy radar with a plan-position indicator.

Further development led to the Type 277 radar, with almost 100 times the transmitter power. In addition to the microwave detection sets, Coales developed the Type 275 and Type 276 microwave fire-control sets. Magnetron refinements resulted in 3.2-cm (9.4-GHz) devices generating 25-kW peak power. These were used in the Type 262 fire-control radar and Type 268 target-indication and navigation radar.

== United States ==
In 1922, A. Hoyt Taylor and Leo C. Young, then with the U.S. Navy Aircraft Radio Laboratory, noticed that a ship crossing the transmission path of a radio link produced a slow fading in and out of the signal. They reported this as a Doppler-beat interference with potential for detecting the passing of a vessel, but it was not pursued. In 1930, Lawrence A. Hyland. working for Taylor at the Naval Research Laboratory (NRL) noted the same effect from a passing airplane.

This was officially reported by Taylor. Hyland, Taylor, and Young were granted a patent (U.S. No. 1981884, 1934) for a "System for detecting objects by radio". It was recognized that detection also needed range measurement, and funding was provided for a pulsed transmitter. This was assigned to a team led by Robert M. Page, and in December 1934, a breadboard apparatus successfully detected an aircraft at a range of one mile.

The Navy, however, ignored further development, and it was not until January 1939, that their first prototype system, the 200-MHz (1.5-m) XAF, was tested at sea. The Navy coined the acronym RAdio Detection And Ranging (RADAR), and in late 1940, ordered this to be exclusively used.

Taylor's 1930 report had been passed on to the U.S. Army's Signal Corps Laboratories (SCL). Here, William R. Blair had projects underway in detecting aircraft from thermal radiation and sound ranging, and started a project in Doppler-beat detection. Following Page's success with pulse-transmission, the SCL soon followed in this area. In 1936, Paul E. Watson developed a pulsed system that on December 14 detected aircraft flying in New York City airspace at ranges up to seven miles. By 1938, this had evolved into the Army's first Radio Position Finding (RPF) set, designated SCR-268, Signal Corps Radio, to disguise the technology. It operated at 200 MHz 1.5 m, with 7-kW peak power. The received signal was used to direct a searchlight.

In Europe, the war with Germany had depleted the United Kingdom of resources. It was decided to give the UK's technical advances to the United States in exchange for access to related American secrets and manufacturing capabilities. In September 1940, the Tizard Mission began.

When the exchange began, the British were surprised to learn of the development of the U.S. Navy's pulse radar system, the CXAM, which was found to be very similar in capability to their Chain Home technology. Although the U.S. had developed pulsed radar independently of the British, there were serious weaknesses in America's efforts, especially the lack of integration of radar into a unified air defense system. Here, the British were without peer.

The result of the Tizard Mission was a major step forward in the evolution of radar in the United States. Although both the NRL and SCL had experimented with 10–cm transmitters, they were stymied by insufficient transmitter power. The cavity magnetron was the answer the U.S. was looking for, and it led to the creation of the MIT Radiation Laboratory (Rad Lab). Before the end of 1940, the Rad Lab was started at MIT, and subsequently almost all radar development in the U.S. was in centimeter-wavelength systems. MIT employed almost 4,000 people at its peak during World War II.

Two other organisations were notable. As the Rad Lab began operations at MIT, a companion group, called the Radio Research Laboratory (RRL), was established at nearby Harvard University. Headed by Frederick Terman, this concentrated on electronic countermeasures to radar. Another organization was the Combined Research Group (CRG) housed at the NRL. This involved American, British, and Canadian teams charged with developing Identification Friend or Foe (IFF) systems used with radars, vital in preventing friendly fire accidents.

=== Metric-Wavelength ===
After trials, the original XAF was improved and designated CXAM; these 200-MHz (1.5-m), 15-kW sets went into limited production with first deliveries in May 1940. The CXAM was refined into the SK early-warning radar, with deliveries starting in late 1941. This 200-MHz (1.5-m) system used a "flying bedspring" antenna and had a PPI. With 200-kW peak-power output, it could detect aircraft at ranges up to 100 miles, and ships at 30 miles. The SK remained the standard early-warning radar for large U.S. vessels throughout the war. Derivatives for smaller vessels were SA and SC. About 500 sets of all versions were built. The related SD was a 114-MHz (2.63-m) set designed by the NRL for use on submarines; with a periscope-like antenna mount, it gave early warning but no directional information. The BTL developed a 500-MHz (0.6-m) fire-control radar designated FA (later, Mark 1). A few went into service in mid-1940, but with only 2-kW power, they were soon replaced.

Even before the SCR-268 went into service, Harold Zahl was working at the SCL in developing a better system. The SCR-270 was the mobile version, and the SCR-271 a fixed version. Operating at 106 MHz (2.83 m) with 100 kW pulsed power, these had a range up to 240 miles and began service entry in late 1940. On 7 December 1941 an SCR-270 at Oahu in Hawaii detected the Japanese attack formation at a range of 136 miles.

One other metric radar was developed by the SCL. After Pearl Harbor, there were concerns that a similar attack might destroy vital locks on the Panama Canal. A transmitter tube that delivered 240-kW pulsed power at 600 MHz (0.5 M) had been developed by Zahl. A team under John W. Marchetti incorporated this in an SCR-268 suitable for picket ships operating up to 100 miles offshore. The equipment was modified to become the AN/TPS-3, a light-weight, portable, early-warning radar used at beachheads and captured airfields in the South Pacific. About 900 were produced.

A British ASV Mk II sample was provided by the Tizard Mission. This became the basis for ASE, for use on patrol aircraft such as the Consolidated PBY Catalina. This was America's first airborne radar to see action; about 7,000 were built. The NRL were working on a 515-MHz (58.3-cm) air-to-surface radar for the Grumman TBF Avenger, a new torpedo bomber. Components of the ASE were incorporated, and it went into production as the ASB when the U.S. entered the war. This set was adopted by the newly formed Army Air Forces as the SCR-521. The last of the non-magnetron radars, over 26,000 were built.

A final "gift" of the Tizard Mission was the Variable Time (VT) Fuze. Alan Butement had conceived the idea for a proximity fuse while he was developing the Coastal Defence system in Great Britain during 1939, and his concept was part of the Tizard Mission. The National Defense Research Committee (NDRC), asked Merle Tuve of the Carnegie Institution of Washington to take the lead in realising the concept, that could increase the probability of kill for shells. From this, the variable-time fuze emerged as an improvement for the fixed-time fuze. The device sensed when the shell neared the target – thus, the name variable-time was applied.

A VT fuze, screwed onto the head of a shell, radiated a CW signal in the 180–220 MHz range. As the shell neared its target, this was reflected at a Doppler shifted frequency by the target and beat with the original signal, the amplitude of which triggered detonation. The device demanded radical miniaturisation of components, and 112 companies and institutions were ultimately involved. In 1942, the project was transferred to the Applied Physics Laboratory, formed by Johns Hopkins University. During the war, some 22 million VT fuses for several calibres of shell were manufactured.

=== Centimeter ===
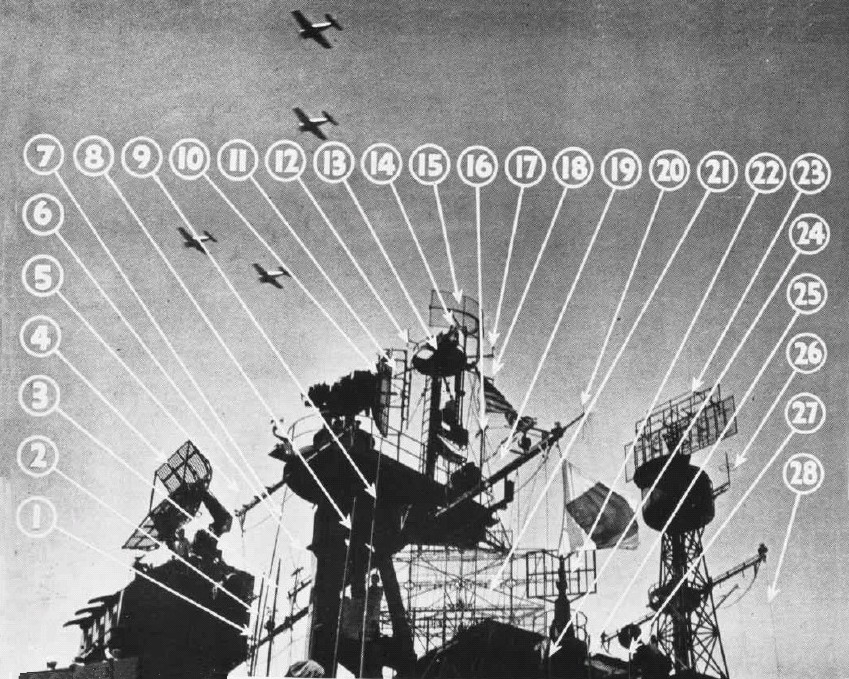
Radar arrangement on the aircraft carrier Lexington, 1944

From 1941–1945, many different microwave radar types were developed in America. Most originated in the Rad Lab where some 100 different types were initiated. Although many companies manufactured sets, only Bell Telephone Laboratories (NTL) had major involvement in development. The two primary military research operations, NRL and SCL, had responsibilities in component development, system engineering, testing, and other support, but did not take on roles for developing new centimetric radar systems.

Operating under the Office of Scientific Research and Development, an agency reporting directly to President Franklin Roosevelt, the Rad Lab was directed by Lee Alvin DuBridge with the eminent scientist Isidor Isaac Rabi serving as his deputy. E. G. "Taffy" Bowen, one of the original developers of RDF and a member of the Tizard Mission, remained in the U.S. as an adviser.

The Rad Lab was assigned three initial projects: a 10 cm aircraft interception radar, a 10 cm gun-laying system for anti-aircraft use, and a long-range aircraft navigation system. The cavity magnetron was duplicated by the Bell Telephone Laboratories (BTL) and placed into production for use by the Rad Lab in the first two projects. The third project, based on directional homing technology, ultimately became LORAN. It was conceived by Alfred Lee Loomis, who had helped form the Rad Lab.

Initially, the Rad Lab built an experimental breadboard set with a 10 cm transmitter and receiver using separate antennas (the T-R switch was not yet available). This was successfully tested in February 1941, detecting an aircraft at a range of 4 miles.

The Rad Lab and BTL also improved magnetron performance, enabling the device and associated systems to generate shorter wavelengths. As more frequencies were used, it became common to refer to centimeter radar operations in the following bands:

P-Band – 30-100 cm (1-0.3 GHz)
L-Band – 15-30 cm (2-1 GHz)
S-Band – 8-15 cm (4-2 GHz)
C-Band – 4-8 cm (8-4 GHz)
X-Band – 2.5-4 cm (12-8 GHz)
K-Band – Ku: 1.7-2.5 cm (18-12 GHz); Ka: 0.75-1.2 cm (40-27 GHz).

There was a gap in the K-band to avoid frequencies absorbed by atmospheric water vapor. These ranges are those given by the IEEE Standards; slightly different values are specified in other standards, such as those of the RSGB.

==== P-Band fire-control ====
After the BTL developed the FA, the first fire-control radar for the U.S. Navy, it improved this with the FC (for use against surface targets) and FD (for directing anti-aircraft weapons). A few of these 60 cm (750 MHz) sets began service in the fall of 1941. They were later designated Mark 3 and Mark 4, respectively. About 125 Mark 3 and 375 Mark 4 sets were produced.

==== S-Band Aircraft Interception ====
For the aircraft intercept radar, the Rad Lab 10 cm breadboard set was fitted with a parabolic antenna having azimuth and elevation scanning capabilities. Cathode-ray tube indicators and appropriate controls were also added. Edwin McMillan was primarily responsible for building and testing the engineering set. This was first flight-tested near the end of March 1941, giving target returns at up to five miles distance and without ground clutter, a primary advantage of microwave radar. Designated SCR-520, this was America's first microwave radar. It saw limited service on some larger patrol aircraft, but was too heavy for fighter aircraft. Improved as the much lighter SCR-720, they were used extensively by both the U.S. and Great Britain (as the AI Mk X).

==== S-Band Army Gun-Laying ====
Microwave gun-laying system development had already started in Great Britain, and it was included with high priority at the Rad Lab due to its urgent need. The project, with Ivan Getting leading, started with the same 10-cm breadboard used in the AI project. Development of the GL system was challenging. A new, complex servomechanism was needed to direct a large parabolic reflector, and automatic tracking was required. On detection of a target, the receiver output would be used to put the servo control into a track-lock mode. The mount and reflector were developed with the Central Engineering Office of Chrysler. BTL developed the electronic analog computer, called the M-9 Predictor-Corrector, containing 160 vacuum tubes. The components were integrated and delivered in May 1942 to the Army Signals Corps for tests. Designated the SCR-584 Anti-Aircraft Gun-Laying System, about 1,500 of these were used in Europe and the Pacific starting in early 1944.

==== S-Band Navy Search ====
After the 10 cm experimental breadboard demonstration, the Navy requested an S-band search radar for shipboard and airborne applications. Under the leadership of Ernest Pollard, the 50 kW SG shipboard set was given sea trials in May 1941, followed by the ASG version for large patrol aircraft and Navy blimps. With a gyro-stabilized mount, the SG could detect large ships at 15 miles and a submarine periscope at 5 miles. About 1,000 of these sets were built. ASG was designated AN/APS-2 and commonly called "George"; some 5,000 of these were built and found to be very effective in submarine detection.

A compact version of the SG for PT boats was designated the SO. These were introduced in 1942. Other variants were the SF, a set for lighter warships, the SH for large merchant vessels, and the SE and SL, for other smaller ships.

The Navy also adopted versions of the Army's SCR-584 (without the M-9 unit but with gyro-stabilizers) for shipboard search radars, the SM for fleet carriers and the SP for escort carriers. None of these were produced in large quantities, but were highly useful in operations.

The BTL developed the SJ, an S-Band supplement for the SD meter-wave radar on submarines. The antenna for the SJ could sweep the horizon to about 6 miles with good accuracy, and in 1945, the SV detection range increased to 30 miles.

==== L-Band Airborne Early-Warning ====
The Rad Lab's Project Cadillac was the first airborne early-warning radar system. Led by Jerome Wiesner, the AN/APS-20 was a 20 cm (1.5 GHz), 1 MW radar weighing 2,300 pounds, with an 8-foot radome enclosing a spinning parabolic antenna. Carried by a TBF Avenger carrier-based aircraft, it could detect large aircraft at ranges up to 100 miles. The airborne radar system included a television camera to pick up the PPI display, and a VHF link transmitted the image back to the Combat Information Center on the host carrier. The system was first flown in August 1944 and went into service the following March. This was the foundation of the post-war Airborne Warning and Control System (AWACS) concept.

==== X-Band ====
In 1941, Luis Alvarez invented a phased array antenna having excellent radiation characteristics. When the 3 cm magnetron was developed, the Alvarez antenna was used in a number of X-Band radars. The Eagle, later designated AN/APQ-7, provided a map-like image of the ground some 170 miles along the forward path of a bomber. About 1,600 Eagle sets were built and used by the Army Air Forces primarily over Japan. The same technology was used in the ASD (AN/APS-2 commonly known as "Dog"), a search and homing radar used by the Navy on smaller bombers; this was followed by several lighter versions, including the AIA-1 known as the "radar gunsight".

The Alvarez antenna was also used in developing the Ground Control Approach (GCA), a combined S-Band and X-Band blind-landing system for bomber bases.

The BTL also developed X-Band radars. The Mark 8 (FH) fire-control radar, was based on a new type of antenna developed by George Mueller. This was an end-fired array of 42 pipe-like waveguides that allowed electronic steering of the beam. The Mark 22 used an antenna shaped like an orange slice. The Army also adopted this as the AN/TPS-10.

Although not implemented into a full system until after the war, the monopulse technique was first demonstrated at the NRL in 1943 on an existing X-Band set. The concept is attributed to Robert Page at the NRL, and was developed to improve the tracking accuracy of radars.

== Soviet Union ==
The Soviet Union invaded Poland in September 1939 under the Molotov–Ribbentrop Pact with Germany; the Soviet Union invaded Finland in November 1939; in June 1941, Germany abrogated the non-aggression pact and invaded the Soviet Union. The USSR had outstanding scientists and engineers that had begun research as soon as anyone else on what would later become radar (radiolokatsiya, lit. radiolocation). Although it had made good progress with early magnetron development, nonetheless it entered the war without a fielded, fully capable radar system.

=== Pre-War Radio-Location Research ===
The USSR military forces were the Raboche-Krest'yanskaya Krasnaya Armiya (RKKA, the Workers' and Peasants' Red Army), the Raboche-Krest'yansky Krasny Flot (RKKF, the Workers' and Peasants' Red Fleet), and the Voyenno-Vozdushnye Sily (VVS, Soviet Air Forces).

By the mid 1930s, Germany's Luftwaffe had aircraft capable of penetrating deep into Soviet territory. Visual observation was used for detecting approaching aircraft. For nighttime detection, the Glavnoye artilleriyskoye upravleniye (GAU, Main Artillery Administration), of the Red Army, had developed an acoustical unit that was used to aim a searchlight at targets. These techniques were impractical with aircraft that were above cloud or at a considerable distance; to overcome this, research was initiated on detection by electromagnetic means. Lieutenant-General M. M. Lobanov was responsible for these efforts in the GAU, and he thoroughly documented this activity later.

==== Leningrad ====
Most early work in radioobnaruzhenie (radio-detection) took place in Leningrad, initially at the Leningradskii Elektrofizicheskii Institut, (Leningrad Electro-Physics Institute, LEPI). Here, Abram F. Ioffe, generally considered the leading physicist in the Soviet Union, was the Scientific Director. The LEPI concentrated on radiating continuous wave (CW) signals, detecting the existence and direction of their reflections for use in early warning systems.

While the GAU was interested in detection, the Voiska Protivo-vozdushnoi oborony (PVO, Air Defense Forces) was interested in determining the target range. Pavel K. Oshchepkov on the PVO technical staff in Moscow, strongly believed that the radiolokatory (radio-location) equipment should be pulsed, potentially allowing range to be determined directly. He was transferred to Leningrad to head a Special Construction Bureau (SCB) for radio-location equipment.

To examine current and proposed detection methods, a meeting was called by the Russian Academy of Sciences; this was held at Leningrad on 16 January 1934 and chaired by Ioffe. Radio-location emerged as the most promising technique, but type (CW or pulsed) and wavelength (high frequency or microwave) were left to be resolved

At the SCB, Oshchepkov's team developed an experimental pulsed radio-location system operating at 4 m (75 MHz.). This had a peak power of about 1 kW and a 10-μs pulse duration; separate transmitting and receiving antennas were used. In April 1937, tests achieved a detection range of nearly 17 km at a height of 1.5 km. Although this was a good beginning for pulsed radio-location, the system was not capable of measuring range (the technique of using pulses for determining range was known from probes of the ionosphere but was not pursued). Although he never created a range-finding capability for his system, Oshchepkov is often called the father of radar in the Soviet Union.

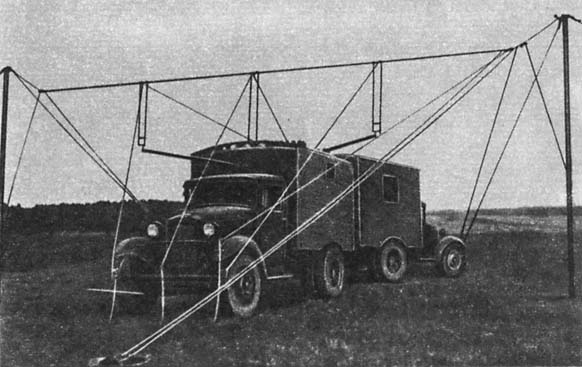
RUS–1. Receiver

As Oshchepkov was exploring pulsed systems, work continued on CW research at the LEPI. In 1935, the LEPI became a part of the Nauchno-issledovatel institut-9 (NII-9, Scientific Research Institute #9), one of several technical sections under the GAU. With M. A. Bonch-Bruevich as Scientific Director, research continued in CW development. Two promising experimental systems were developed. A VHF set designated Bistro (Rapid) and the microwave Burya (Storm). The best features of these were combined into a mobile system called Radio Ulavlivatel Samoletov (Radio Catcher of Aircraft), soon designated RUS-1 (РУС-1). This CW, bi-static system used a truck-mounted transmitter operating at 4.7 m (64 MHz) and two truck-mounted receivers.

In June 1937, all of the work in Leningrad on radio-location stopped. The Great Purge of Joseph Stalin swept over the military and the scientific community, resulting in over 631,000 executions. The SCB was closed; Oshchepkov was charged with "high crimes" and sentenced to 10 years at a Gulag. NII-9 was also targeted, but was saved through the influence of Bonch-Bruyevich, a favorite of Vladimir Lenin in the prior decade. NII-9 as an organization was saved, and Bonch-Bruyevich was named director. The purges resulted in a loss of more than a year in development.

RUS-1 was tested and put into production in 1939, entering limited service in 1940, becoming the first deployed radio-location system in the Red Army. Bonch-Bruyevich died in March 1941, creating a leadership gap, further delaying CW radio-location developments.

The Nauchnoissledovatelskii ispytatelnyi institut svyazi RKKA (NIIIS-KA, Scientific Research Institute of Signals of the Red Army), that had originally bitterly opposed radio-location technology, was now placed in overall control of its development in the Soviet Union. They co-opted Oshchepkov's pulsed system, and by July 1938, had a fixed-position, bistatic experimental array that detected an aircraft at 30-km range at heights of 500 m, and at 95-km range for targets at 7.5 km altitude. The project was then taken on by Ioffe's LPTI, resulting in a system designated Redut (Redoubt) with 50-kW peak-power and a 10-μs pulse-duration. The Redut was first field tested in October 1939, at a site near Sevastopol, a strategic Black Sea naval port.

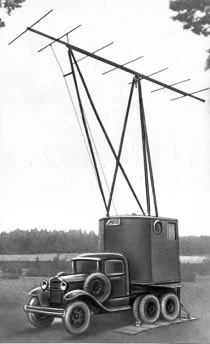
RUS–2. Receiver (artist's impression)

During 1940, the LEPI took control of Redut development, perfecting the critical capability of range measurements. A cathode-ray display, made from an oscilloscope, was used to show range information. In July 1940, the new system was designated RUS-2 (РУС-2). A transmit-receive device (a duplexer) to allow operating with a common antenna was developed in February 1941. These breakthroughs were achieved at an experimental station at Toksovo (near Leningrad), and an order was placed with the Svetlana Factory for 15 systems.

The final RUS-2 had pulse-power of near 40 kW at 4 m (75 MHz). The set was in a cabin on a motor-driven platform, with a seven-element Yagi-Uda antenna mounted about five meters above the roof. The cabin, with the antenna, could be rotated over a large sector to aim the transmit-receive pattern. Detection range was 10 to 30 km for targets as low as 500 m and 25 to 100 km for high-altitude targets. Variance was about 1.5 km for range and 7 degrees for azimuth.

==== Kharkov ====
A second center for radio-location research was in Kharkov, Ukraine. Here the Ukrainian Institute of Physics and Technology (UIPT) closely cooperated with Kharkov University (KU). The UIPT became renowned outside the USSR, and drew visits from world-recognized physicists such as Niels Bohr and Paul Dirac. Future Nobel Laureate Lev Landau led the Theoretical Department. The independent Laboratory of Electromagnetic Oscillations (LEMO) was led by Abram A. Slutskin.

At the LEMO, magnetrons were a major item of research. By 1934, a team led by Aleksandr Y. Usikov had developed a series of segmented-anode magnetrons covering 80 to 20 cm (0.37 to 1.5 GHz), with output power between 30 and 100 W. Semion Y. Braude developed a glass-cased magnetron producing 17 kW with 55 percent efficiency at 80 cm (370 MHz), tunable over a wavelength change of 30 percent.

In 1937, the NIIIS-KA contracted with LEMO for developing a pulsed radio-location system for aircraft detection. The project was code-named Zenit (a popular football team at the time) and was headed by Slutskin. Transmitter development was led by Usikov. The unit used a 60-cm (500-MHz) magnetron pulsed at 7–10-μs duration and providing 3-kW pulsed power, later increased to near 10 kW. Braude led receiver development. This was a superheterodyne unit initially using a tunable magnetron as the local oscillator, but this lacked stability and was replaced with a circuit using an RCA type 955 acorn triode. The returned pulses were displayed on a cathode-ray oscilloscope, giving range measurement. Zenit was tested in October 1938. In this, a medium bomber was detected at a range of 3 km, and areas for improvements were determined. After the changes had been made, a demonstration was given in September 1940. It was shown that the three coordinates (range, altitude, and azimuth) of an aircraft flying at heights between 4,000 and 7,000 meters could be determined at up to 25 km distance, but with poor accuracy. Also, with the antennas aimed at a low angle, ground clutter was a problem. However unsuitable for gun-laying applications, it did show the way for future systems. An operating feature, however, rendered Zenit unsuitable for gun laying for attacking fast-moving aircraft. A null-reading method was used for analyzing the signals; azimuth and elevation coordinates had to be acquired separately, requiring a sequence of antenna movements that took 38 seconds for the three coordinates.

Work at the LEMO continued on Zenit, converting it into a single-antenna system designated Rubin. This effort, however, was disrupted by the invasion of the USSR by Germany in June 1941. In a short while, all of the critical industries and other operations in Kharkov were ordered evacuated far into the East.

=== Wartime ===
When the German blitzkrieg swept into the Soviet Union in June 1941, three massive, tank-led Army groups moved in on a 900-mile (1,400 km) front with Leningrad, Moscow, and Ukraine as objectives. There followed what became known to the Soviets as the Great Patriotic War. The Komitet Oborony (Defense Committee – the small group of leaders surrounding Stalin) gave first priority to the defense of Moscow; the laboratories and factories in Leningrad were to be evacuated to the Urals, to be followed by the Kharkov facilities.

Several different radar systems were produced by the Soviet Union in the relocated facilities during the war. supplemented by some 2,600 radar sets of various types under the Lend-Lease Program.

==== Ground-based ====
The Sveltana Factory in Leningrad had built about 45 RUS-1 systems. These were deployed along western borders and in the Far East. Without ranging capability, however, the military found the RUS-1 to be of little value. When air attacks on Leningrad began, the RUS-2 test unit assembled at the Toksovo experimental site was pressed into tactical operation, providing early-warning of Luftwaffe (German Air Force) formations. With a range up to 100 km, this unit gave timely information to civil defence and fighter networks. This gained the attention of authorities, who previously had shown little interest in radio-location equipment.

In mid-July, the radio-location activities of the LEPI and NII-9 were sent to Moscow where they were combined with existing units of the NIIIS-KA. A RUS-2 system was set up near Moscow and manned by recently moved LPTI personnel; it was first used on July 22, when it detected at night an incoming flight of about 200 German bombers while they were 100 km away. This was the first air attack on Moscow, and it immediately led to three rings of anti-aircraft batteries being built around the city, all connected to a central command post.

Several transmitters and receivers built for RUS-2 systems were quickly adapted by the NIII-KA for fixed radio-location stations around Moscow. Designated as RUS-2S and also P2 Pegmatit, these had their Yagi antenna mounted on 20-meter steel towers and could scan a sector of 270 degrees. For building additional equipment, in January 1942, Factory 339 in Moscow became the first manufacturing facility in the Soviet Union devoted to radio-location sets (soon officially called radar). During 1942, this facility built and installed 53 RUS-2S sets around Moscow and other critical locations in the USSR.

Factory 339 had an outstanding research and engineering staff; this had earlier been administratively separated and designated as the Scientific Institute of Radio Industry No. 20 (NII-20). Victor V. Tikhomirov, a pioneer in domestic aircraft radio engineering, was the Technical Director. (Later, the Tikhomirov Scientific Research Institute of Instrument Design was named in his honor.) Factory 339 and the associated NII-20 dominated radar equipment development and fabrication in the USSR throughout the war.

Many sets of a number of different versions of the RUS-2 were built at Factory 339 during the war. While providing early warning, these sets suffered from the deficiency of not providing target height (elevation angle). Thus, they were mainly used in conjunction with visual-observation posts, with humans using optical devices for estimating altitude and identifying the type of aircraft.

The NII-20 developed a unit to be carried on an aircraft that would automatically respond as "friendly" to a radio illumination from a Soviet radar. A transponder, designated as SCH-3 and later called an Identification Friend or Foe (IFF) unit, was placed into production at Factory 339 in 1942. This unit initially responded only to the signal of RUS-2, and only a relatively small number of these and successor units were built in the USSR.

The RUS-2 was sponsored by the PVO and intended for early warning. Mikhail L. Sliozberg's team developed a 15 centimeter bistatic radar system called SON. An October test was a failure, and NII-9 was no longer involved in radio location research.

In 1942, the Soviet Union acquired a British gun laying Range and Direction Finding system, the GL Mk II, which they reverse engineered as the Son-2a. Operating at 5 m (60 MHz), Son-2a used three trucks for the transmitting, receiving and power. About 125 sets were built, which combined with 200 Gl MK II systems from Great Britain, made it the most used radar for the Soviet Union.

In 1941, UIPT was sent to Alma-Ata, and while LEMO was sent to Bukhara, while a team under A.Y. Usikov, S.Y. Braude were sent to Moscow with Zenit. Attached to the NIIIS-KA, it proved useful for barrage firing, and guiding fighter aircraft.

In 1943, a prototype Rubin was tested. It included a new magnetron was developed; this operated at 54 cm (470 MHz) with a pulse-power increased to 15 kW. A gas-discharge transmit-receive device (a diplexer) was developed for isolating the receiver from the direct transmitter pulse, thus allowing the use of a common transmitting-receiving structure. An oscilloscope displayed range, azimuth, and elevation. A 3 meter parabolic reflector used transmitting and receiving dipoles at its focus. A separate truck provided power. During the war, the system was used by the Soviet Navy.

==== Airborne ====
In 1940, an airborne radar system was developed for the Soviet Air Forces' Pe-2. The Gneis 16 centimeter system used a reflex klystron developed by Nikolay Devyatkov. Gneiss-2 used a 1.5 meter system. One wing had a broad-pattern transmitting array, while the other wing contained a Yagi antenna directed forward and another directed 45 degrees outward. The system had a range of 4 kilometers and provided target azimuth. About 230 sets were built, with a few installed on Yak-3s and Yak-9s.

==== Naval ====
In 1932, the Director of the NIIIS-KF (Red Fleet Signals Research), Aksel Berg reviewed Redut test, and adapted a RUS-2 for marine use. The subsequent system, Redut-K was deployed on the Soviet cruiser Molotov.

Other indigenous Soviet Navy radars developed (but not put into production) during the war included Gyuis-1, operating at 1.4 m with 80- kW pulse power. This was a successor to Redut-K for early warning; the prototype was installed on the destroyer Gromkii in 1944. Two fire-control radars were simultaneously developed: Mars-1 for cruisers and Mars-2 for destroyers. Both were tested just at the close of the war, and later placed into production as Redan-1 and Redan-2, respectively.

== Germany ==
By the time the war started, Germany had a long heritage of using electromagnetic waves for detecting objects. In 1888, Heinrich Hertz, who first demonstrated the existence of these waves, and that they were reflected by metal surfaces. In 1904, Christian Hülsmeyer obtained German and foreign patents the Telemobilskop, an anti-collision system, using a 50 centimeter spark-gap transmitter and coherer. In 1906, he modified the system such that the receiver only responded to a certain transmitter signal.

In 1933, physicist Rudolf Kühnhold, Scientific Director at the Kriegsmarine (German Navy) Nachrichtenmittel-Versuchsanstalt (NVA) (Signals Research Establishment) in Kiel, initiated experiments in the microwave region to measure the distance to a target. For the transmitter, he obtained assistance from two radio amateur operators, Paul-Günther Erbslöh and Hans-Karl Freiherr von Willisen. In January 1934, they formed at Berlin-Oberschöneweide the company Gesellschaft für Elektroakustische und Mechanische Apparate (GEMA) for this work.

GEMA started development of a Funkmessgerät für Untersuchung with Hans Hollmann and Theodor Schultes added as consultants. The first development was a continuous-wave apparatus using Doppler-beat interference for detection. The system used a 50 centimeter magnetron designed by Klass Posthumus of Philips Natuurkundig Laboratorium, Barkhausen-Kurz tube regenerative receiver built by Hollmann, and a Schultes developed Yagi antenna. Kühnhold then shifted the GEMA work to a pulse-modulated system.

In May 1935, GEMA tested its pulse-modulated system, using a 50 cm (600 MHz) magnetron from Philips modulated with a 2-μs pulses at a pulse repetition frequency (PRF) of 2000 Hz, transmitted with an array of 10 pairs of dipoles. The Acorn tube regenerative receiver used an antenna with three pairs of dipoles for lobe switching, and a duplexer when transmitting. Range was displayed with a Braun tube. In September, an improved super-regenerative receiver tracked vessels up 8 kilometers, was then demonstrated to Admiral Erich Raeder, and eventually mounted on the Welle. The Kriegsmarine then funded development of the Seetakt series, Dezimeter Telegraphie DeTe-1 and DeTe-II. The DeTe-1 consisted of the 80 centimeter Flakleit for directing fire up to 80 kilometers, and the fixed-based Flakleit-G with height finder. The 2.4 meter DeTe-II was an air warning radar system. In 1938, Wolfgang Martini ordered the development of a ground-based version of DeTe-II for the Luftwaffe. Called Freya, the radar had a range of some 130 km, and an Identification Friend or Foe capability called Erstling. The transmitter and receiver antennas consisted of twelve vertical dipole antennas, in a tower configuration with the receiver on top, the transmitter at the bottom, and the IFF in between. In 1940, lobe switching was introduced, and in 1941, 16 Freyas were linked with phased array in a system called Mammut, giving it a range of 300 km. The Wasserman, with eight Freyas, was mounted on a steerable tower. Both Mammut and Wassermann were used to control fighters. Throughout the war, GEMA provided a wide variety of Seetakt sets, mainly for ships but also for several types for U-boats. Most had an excellent range-measuring module called Messkette (measuring chain) that provided range accuracy within a few meters regardless of the total range. The shipboard Seetakt used a "mattress" antenna similar to the "bedspring" on the American CXAM.

This first Funkmessgerät from GEMA incorporated more advanced technologies than early sets in Great Britain and the United States, but it appears radar received a much lower priority until later in World War II; by the start of the war, few had been fielded. To a large part, this was due to the lack of appreciation of this technology by the military hierarchy, especially at the top where dictator Adolf Hitler looked on radar as a defensive weapon, and his interest was in offensive hardware. This problem was compounded by the lackadaisical approach to command staffing. It was some time before the Luftwaffe had a command and control system nearly as effective as the one set up by the Royal Air Force in Great Britain before the war.

In 1935, Telefunken's Wilhelm Runge noted a Doppler-effect with a Ju-52 overflight, using a 50 centimeter Barkhausen-Kurz tube system. A subsequent 1.8 meter pulse-modulated system called Darmstadt was tested in 1936. It was able to detect aircraft 5 km away. In 1938, the 50 centimeter Würzburg radar system was adopted as the leading gun laying system for the Luftwaffe and German Army. The Würzburg-Riese increased range and accuracy. In 1940, the Würzburg started directing the Flak batteries.

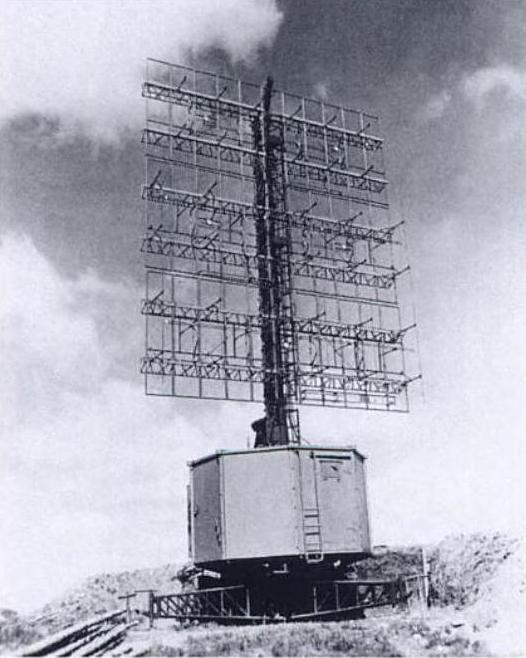
Freya radar

In 1940, Josef Kammhuber used Freyas in a new air-defense network extending through the Netherlands, Belgium, and France. Called the Kammhuber Line by the Allies, it was composed of a series of cells code-named Himmelbett (four-poster bed), each covering an area some 45 km wide and 30 km deep, and containing a radar, several searchlights, and a primary and backup night-fighter aircraft. This was relatively effective except when the sky was overcast. A new gun-directing radar was needed to cover this deficiency and the Luftwaffe then contracted with Telefunken for such a system.

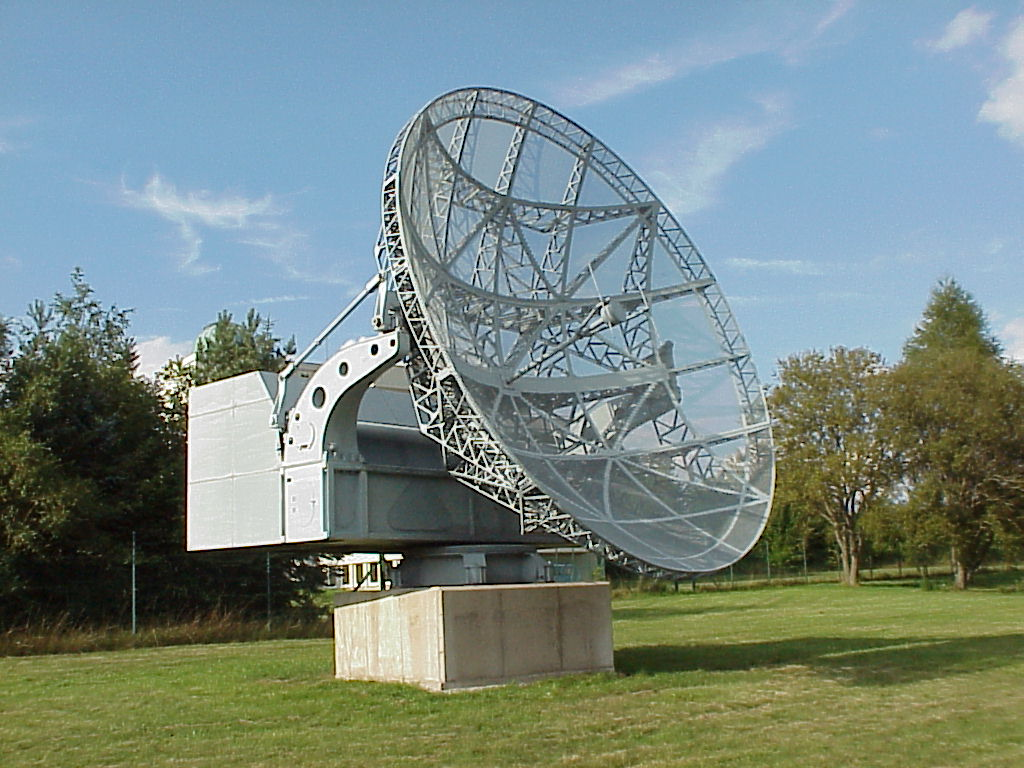
Würzburg-Riese radar

A system with great range was needed to track the British and American bomber formations as they crossed Germany. For this function, consultants Theodor Schultes and Hans Hollmann designed an experimental 2.4-m (125-MHz), 30-kW radar called Panorama. Built by Siemens & Halske in 1941, it was placed atop a concrete tower at Tremmen, a few kilometers south of Berlin. The antenna had 18 dipoles on a long, horizontal support and produced a narrow vertical beam; this rotated at 6 rpm to sweep out 360-degrees of coverage to about 110 km.

Based on the operation of Panorama, Siemens & Halske improved this system, and renamed it Jagdschloss (hunting lodge). They added a second switchable operation to 150 kW at 1.2 m (250 MHz), increasing the range to near 200 km. The information from the receivers was sent via co-axial cable or a 50-cm link from the tower to a central command center, where it was used to direct fighter aircraft. Hollmann's polar-coordinate (PPI) CRT was used in the display, the first German system with this device; it was also added to the Panorama. The Jagdschloss entered service in late 1943, and about 80 systems were eventually built. The Jagdwagen (hunting car) was a mobile, single-frequency version; operating at 54 cm (560 MHz), it had a correspondingly smaller antenna system.

Lorenz AG developed Flak support systems called Kurfürst, Kurpfulz, and Kurmark. Mobile versions were the FuMG407 Tiefentwiel, for low-flying aircraft, and the 54 centimeter Jagdwagen, for air surveillance. In 1944, a few of these systems were produced.

Although German researchers had developed magnetrons in the early 1930s (Hans Hollmann received a U.S. patent on his device in July 1938), none had been suitable for military radars. In February 1943, a British bomber containing a H2S radar was shot down over the Netherlands, and the 10-cm magnetron was found intact. In short order, the secret of making successful magnetrons was discovered, and microwave radar development started.

Telefunken was commissioned to build a gun-laying set for Flak applications, and at the beginning of 1944, a 10-cm set code-named Marbach emerged. Using a 3-m Mannheim reflector, this set had a detection range of about 30 km. Its most important characteristic was a relative immunity to Window – the chaff used by the British as a countermeasure against the 50-cm Würzburg. The Marbach was produced in limited quantities for Flak batteries around a number of large industrial cities.

Several other 10-cm sets were developed, but none made it into mass production. One was Jagdschloss Z, a Panorama-type experimental set with 100-kW pulse-power built by Siemens & Halske. Kulmbach was a similar set but with only 15-kW pulse-power and using a cylindrical parabolic reflector to produce a very narrow beam; when used with Marbach, the combined fire-control system was called Egerland.

Near the end of 1943, the Germans also salvaged radars containing 3-cm magnetrons, but sets operating at this wavelength were never produced. They did, however, play an important role in the German development of countermeasures, particularly radar warning receivers.

=== Airborne ===
In June 1941 an RAF bomber equipped with an ASV (Air-to-Surface Vessel) Mk II radar made an emergency landing in France. Although the crew had attempted to destroy the set, the remains were sufficient for the German Laboratory for Aviation to discern the operation and its function. Tests indicated the merits of such a radar, and Wolfgang Martini also saw the value and tasked Lorenz to develop a similar system.

In 1942, Lorenz produced the 55 centimeter Hohentwiel air reconnaissance system. It produced 50-kW pulse-power at low-UHF band frequencies (545 MHz) and had a very low PRF of 50 Hz. The set used two separate antenna arrangements, providing searching either forward or side-looking. In 1943, the Hohentwiel-U was adapted for submarine use.

The use of the accurate Freya and Würzburg radars in their air-defense systems allowed the Germans to have a somewhat less vigorous approach to the development of airborne radar. Unlike the British, whose inaccurate CH systems demanded some sort of system in the aircraft, the Würzburg was accurate enough to allow them to leave the radar on the ground. This came back to haunt them when the British discovered the mode of operation of the Himmelbett tactic, and the development of an airborne system became much more important.

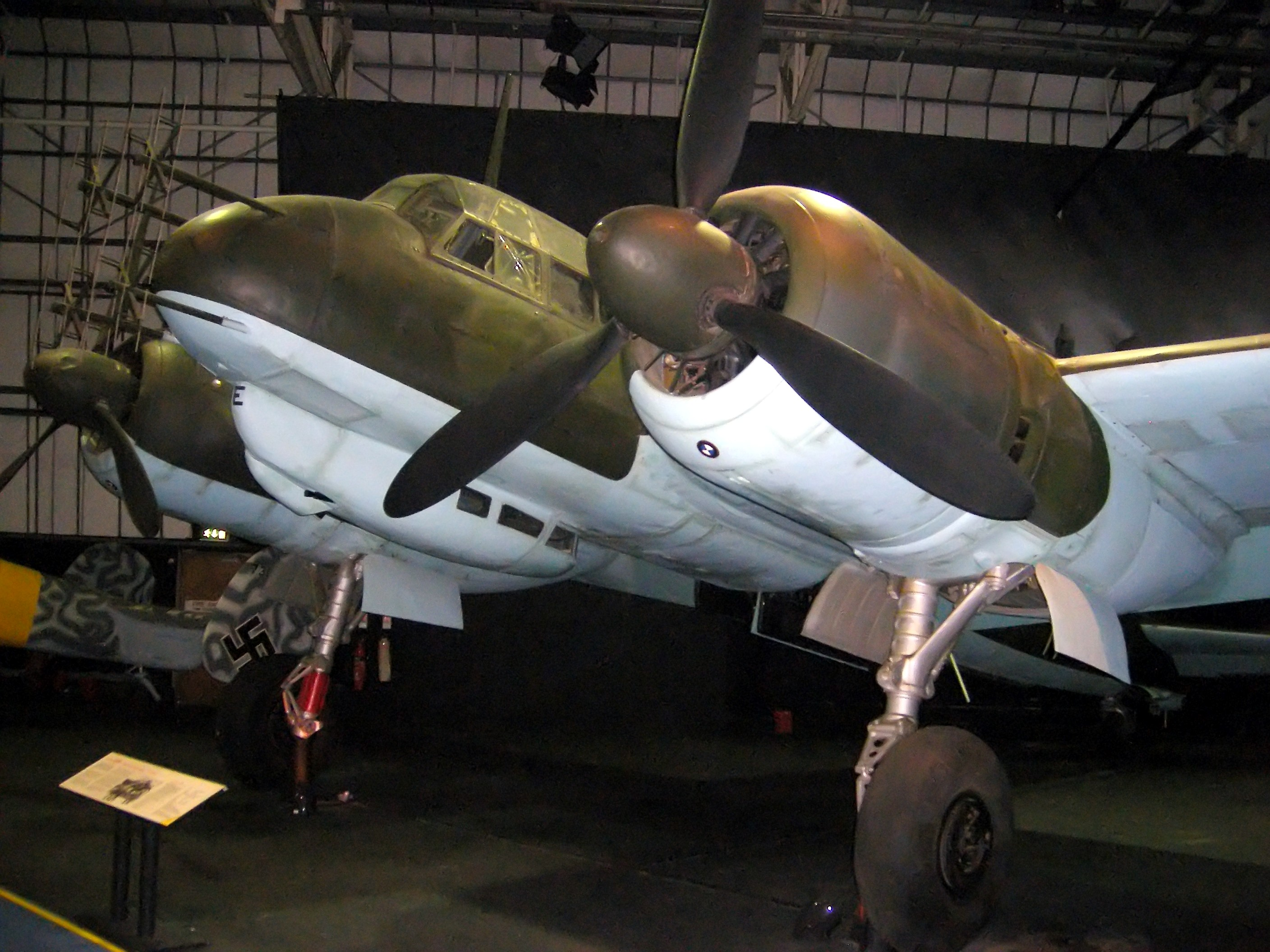
The preserved Ju 88R-1, whose UHF-band Lichtenstein B/C radar with 32-dipole Matratze antenna array, captured by the RAF in May 1943

In 1941, Telefunken's Runge started developing the 62 centimeter Lichtenstein. By shaping the pulse, a 200 m minimum range was achieved, and saw combat in September 1942. In 1943, a longer range version became available with the 3.7 to 4.1 meter Lichtenstein SN2. The Matratze (mattress) antenna array in its full form had sixteen dipoles with reflectors (a total of 32 elements), giving a wide searching field and a typical 4-km maximum range (limited by ground clutter and dependent on altitude), but producing a great deal of aerodynamic drag. A rotating phase-shifter was inserted in the transmission lines to produce a twirling beam. The elevation and azimuth of a target relative to the fighter were shown by corresponding positions on a triple-tube CRT display.

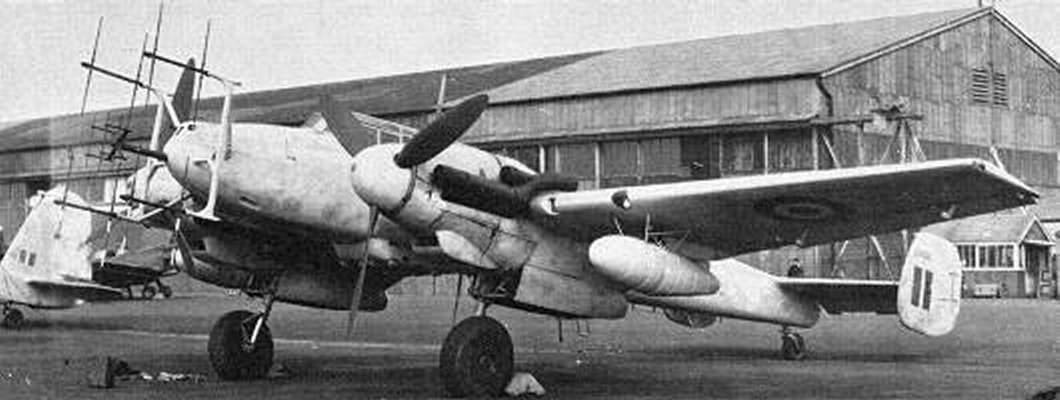
A captured Bf 110G night fighter with the "one-quarter" subset of the Matratze antenna centrally fitted, along with a full Hirschgeweih eight-dipole antenna set for use of both UHF and VHF radar.

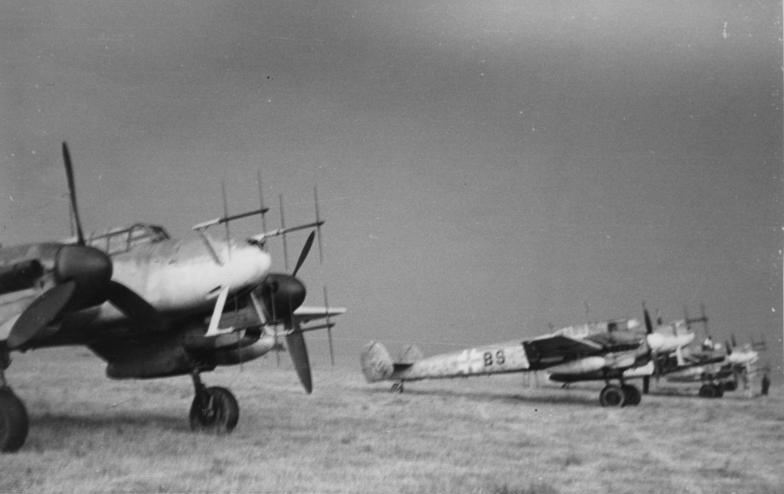
Bf 110G night fighters with the Hirschgeweih eight-dipole antenna arrays for their SN-2 sets

The British took longer to find jamming for the SN-2, but this was eventually accomplished after July 1944. The much longer set of eight dipole elements for the full Hirschgeweih (stag's antlers) antenna array replaced the set of thirty-two elements of the Matratze array from the UHF-band B/C and C-1 sets, but with the early SN-2 sets having a deficient minimum range of about half a kilometer, aircraft often needed to retain the earlier gear to make up for this until the deficiency was addressed. This sometimes resulted in full sets of both Matratze and Hirschgeweih antennas festooning the noses of German night fighters, causing a disastrous problem with drag until a "one-quarter" subset of the Matratze array was created for a centrally mounted installation on the nose, replacing the full four-set UHF array. Then, as the minimum range problem was worked out with the SN-2 sets later in 1943, the earlier UHF-band B/C and C-1 sets and their antennas could be removed entirely. As the planned replacement for the Lichtenstein series of sets, the government-developed Neptun radar, operating on yet a third set of different mid-VHF band frequencies (from 125 MHz to 187 MHz) to avoid Window interference, was placed in production by early 1944, and could use the same Hirschgweih antennas—with shorter dipoles fitted—as the SN-2 sets had used. By the 1943-44 timeframe, the SN-2 and Neptun radars could also use the experimental Morgenstern German AI VHF-band radar antenna, using twin 90°-angled three-dipole pairs of Yagi antennas mounted to a single forward-projecting mast, making it possible to fair the array for drag reduction purposes within a conical, rubber-covered plywood radome on an aircraft's nose, with the extreme tips of the Morgenstern's antenna elements protruding from the radome's surface. At least one Ju 88G-6 night fighter of the NJG 4 night fighter wing's staff flight used it late in the war for its Lichtenstein SN-2 AI radar installation.

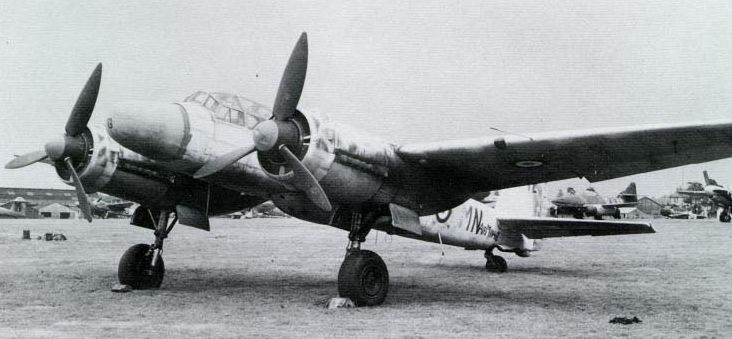
A Ju 88G-6 (often misdesignated "G-7c" in books) with a Berlin radar's nonmetallic radome on the nose.

Although Telefunken had not been previously involved with radars of any type for fighter aircraft, in 1944 they started the conversion of a Marbach 10-cm set for this application. Downed American and British planes were scavenged for radar components; of special interest were the swiveling mechanisms used to scan the beam over the search area. An airborne set with a half-elliptical radome enclosed dish antenna, code-named FuG 240 Berlin was completed in January 1945, and about 40 sets were built and placed on night-fighter aircraft. A few sets, code named Berlin-S, were also built for shipboard surveillance.

== Japan ==
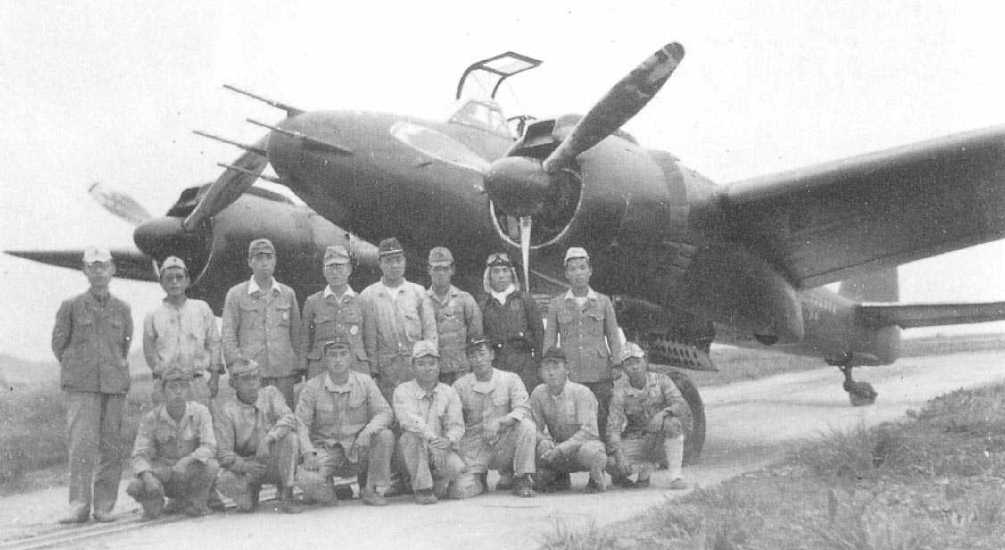
Nakajima J1N night fighter with FD-2 nose radar

In the years prior to World War II, Japan had knowledgeable researchers in the technologies necessary for radar; they were especially advanced in magnetron development. However, a lack of appreciation of radar's potential and rivalry between army, navy and civilian research groups meant Japan's development was slow. It was not until November 1941, just days before the attack on Pearl Harbor, that Japan placed into service its first full radar system. In August 1942, U.S. marines captured one of these first systems, and, although crude even by the standards of early U.S. radars, the fact the Japanese had any radar capability came as a surprise. Japanese radar technology was 3 to 5 years behind that of America, Great Britain, and Germany throughout the war.

Hidetsugu Yagi is quoted as saying, "The Army and Navy certainly never co-operated with each other. Each acted as if it would be preferable to lose the war rather than co-operate...They treated [university] scientists exactly as if they were 'foreigners'...It seems that they attempted to keep information relating even to the enemy's weapons secret from scientists."

In 1940, Commander Yoji Ito representing the Navy, and Lieutenant Colonel Kinji Satake, representing the Army, visited Germany in a technology exchange. They were able to see captured British GL Mk 1 radar, and Ito was able to see the Würzburg radar. A complete set with documentation was sent to Japan on the Japanese submarine I-30.

The Japanese were able to acquire a GL Mk 2, and a Searchlight Control radar, system with the Fall of Singapore. They also acquired an SCR-268 and SCR-270 after the Battle of Corregidor. These systems provided the Japanese with enough information to develop pulsed radar. This led to NEC's Masanori Morita developing the 3.75 meter Tachi-3, Toshiba's Shigenori Hamada 1.5 meter Tach-4, and the 3-4 meter Tachi-6, radar systems. Mobile systems included the Tachi-7 and Tachi-18, while Tase-1 and Tase-1 were anti-surface shipboard systems. Airborne surveillance radars included the Taki-1 and Taki-11.

The Tama Technology Research Institute (TTRI) was formed by the Army to lead in what was called Radio Range-Finder (RRF) development. TTRI was staffed with competent personnel, but most of their developmental work was done by contractors at the research laboratories of Toshiba Shibaura Denki (Toshiba) and Nippon Electric Company (NEC).

The Naval Technical Research Institute (NTRI) began work on a pulse-modulated system in August 1941, even before Yoji Ito returned from Germany. With assistance from NEC (Nippon Electric Company) and the Research Laboratory of NHK (Japan Broadcasting Corporation), a prototype set was developed on a crash basis. Kenjiro Takayanagi, Chief Engineer of NHK, developed the pulse-forming and timing circuits as well as the receiver display. The prototype was tested in early September.

In 1941, the 3 meter Mark 1 Model 1 was successfully tested, and placed in service, after major contributions by Kenjiro Takayanagi. The system had separate transmitter and receiver dipole antennas. In November 1941, the first manufactured RRF was placed into service as a land-based early-warning system at Katsuura, Chiba, a town on the Pacific coast about 100 km (62 mi) from Tokyo. A large system, it weighed close to 8,700 kg (19,200 lb). The detection range was about 130 km (81 mi) for single aircraft and 250 km (160 mi) for groups. In 1942, the Type 12 operated at either 2 or 1.5 m. Type 21 was a shipboard version. Type 13 used a diplexer for a common antenna. In 1945, the 6 meter Type 14 entered service. In 1943, the Imperial Navy deployed the Type 41 , and then the Type 42 in 1943, both based on the captured SCR-268.

Japan Radio Company (JRC) had long worked with the NTRI in developing magnetrons. In early 1941, JRC was given a contract by NTRI to design and build a microwave surface-detection system for warships. Designated Type 22, this used a pulse-modulated, 10 cm (3.0 GHz) magnetron with water-cooling and producing 2 kW peak-power. The receiver was a super-heterodyne type with a low-power magnetron serving as the local oscillator. Separate horn antennas were used for transmitting and receiving. These were mounted on a common platform that could be rotated in the horizontal plane. Since it was Japan's first full set using a magnetron, Yoji Ito was made responsible and gave it special attention.

In March 1942, Type 22 was deployed on theKazegumo and the Makigumo. In April, Type 12 was deployed on the Japanese battleship Ise and the Japanese battleship Hyūga. In 1944, the 10 centimeter Type 32 was deployed as a fire-control system.

In 1942, the Imperial Navy deployed the 2 meter Type 64 airborne radar system, followed by the 1.2 meter Type N-6 in 1944. The 2 meter Type FM-3 was built for the Kyūshū Q1W Tōkai. In 1944, the 25 centimeter FD-3, using four Yagi antennas, was put into service. In 1942, the E-27 warning receiver operated between 0.75 and 4 meters, and over 2000 were deployed on ships and submarines.

When magnetrons were being developed in Japan, the initial primary application was intended to be power transmission, not radar. As these devices increased in output energy, their application for a weapon became apparent. For research in special weapons, a large facility was built in Shimada. In 1943, a project in developing a Ku-go (Death Ray) using magnetrons began. By the end of the war, magnetrons developing 100 kW continuous power at 75 cm (400 MHz) had been built, and the intent was apparently to couple 10 of these to produce a beam of 1,000 kW. Essentially all of the equipment and documents at Shimada were destroyed before the Americans reached the facility.

== Italy ==
The first radar prototypes in Italy were developed as early as 1935 by electronics researcher Ugo Tiberio who, after graduating in 1927 from the Royal School of Engineering in Naples, published some papers on electromagnetism and, during his military service, was posted to the Military Communications Institute in Rome where Colonel Luigi Sacco - after having observed some experiments made by Guglielmo Marconi on the reflection of radio waves - gave him the task to verify whether these properties of radio waves could be used to find the location of distant objects.

After his discharge from the Royal Army, Tiberio's work came to the attention of Nello Carrara, a professor at the Italian Naval Academy of Livorno, who obtained for him a commission as Lieutenant in order to allow him to further his research at the Academy. This led to the development in the period 1936–1937 of the first functioning prototype of a naval radar, the EC-1 nicknamed "Gufo" (owl).

Notwithstanding their achievement, conducted under the supervision of Navy Captain Alfeo Brandimarte, the project was stalled due to the lack of funding and resources, as both Tiberi and Carrara had to attend their teaching duties and could only do research in their spare time. Furthermore, notwithstanding the efforts of Capt. Brandimarte in bringing the importance of the device to the Italian Royal Navy's higher echelons, his perorations were met with arrogance and disbelief. One admiral went so far to tell him that: "In the whole history of naval warfare, battles have taken place during daytime, therefore the fact that your device could locate enemy ships in nighttime is completely useless!".

This attitude lasted until 1941, when interest in the radar was abruptly revived soon after the Italian navy suffered a series of heavy setbacks in night actions against the radar-equipped units of the Royal Navy, especially that of the Battle of Cape Matapan where over 3,000 sailors and officers were lost at sea without managing to fire a single shot.

The first tests were conducted on board the torpedo boat Giacinto Carini in April 1941. The radar sets were produced by the Italian company SAFAR. Only 12 devices had been installed on board Italian warships by 8 September 1943, the day Italy signed an armistice with the Allies. Beginning in the spring of 1943, the recommendation of the Italian High Command was to switch the radar on only in proximity of enemy forces, after an incorrect German advisory that the British had radar warning receivers similar to the Metox. The Allies, however, did not develop such technology until 1944. In spite of this, it has been reported that the crews made a wide use of the Gufo as a search radar, omitting to mention it on the ship's logbook to avoid sanctions.

The radar was used in combat by the light cruiser Scipione Africano on the night of 17 July 1943, while on passage from La Spezia to Taranto, when she detected a flotilla of four British Elco motor torpedo boats five miles ahead in the strait of Messina. One of the motor boats, MTB 316, was destroyed by the cruiser's guns, and another one was seriously damaged. Twelve British seamen lost their lives.

After Italy's armistice in September 1943, all the documentation pertaining to the research and development of the "Gufo" and of its ground-based version, named "Folaga" (coot) and built by Radiomarelli, was destroyed by order of the Italian Royal Navy Command to prevent it from falling in the hands of the occupying Nazi troops. Brandimarte, who had been promoted to Lt. Commander due to his achievements in developing the radar, joined the Italian anti-fascist resistance movement and was taken prisoner and subsequently executed by the Germans in 1944.

== Netherlands ==
From 1936 onwards, the Meetgebouw in Wassenaar started to develop the electric listening device, i.o.w. a 70 cm (425 MHz) radar. Production of this M39 set just started before the German invasion of The Netherlands. Only one device was operational downtown The Hague. Von Weiler, one of the developers and Staal, tasked to coordinate the production, could escape to England with the drawings. Two transmitter/receiver sets arrived in England via another route. All other systems, components and drawings were systematically destroyed. Von Weiler and Staal developed a naval version, the Range and Direction Finder 289 (RDF 289), based on this design for the HNLMS Isaac Sweers. Each of the two RDFs provided input to a Hazemijer fire control unit. Each Hazemeijer fire control unit controlled a twin-mounted Bofors 40 mm gun.

== Other Commonwealth countries ==
When war with Germany was believed to be inevitable, Great Britain shared its secrets of RDF (radar) with the Commonwealth dominions of Australia, Canada, New Zealand, and South Africa – and asked that they develop their own capabilities for indigenous systems. After Germany invaded Poland in September 1939, Great Britain and the Commonwealth Nations declared war with Germany. Within a short time, all four of the Commonwealth Nations had locally designed radar systems in operation, and most continued with developments throughout the war.

=== Australia ===
In 1939, after David Forbes Martyn was briefed on the British radar developments, he convinced the Council for Scientific and Industrial Research to establish the Radiophysics Laboratory (RPL) at the University of Sydney to develop such systems. Led by John H. Piddington, their first project produced a shore-defense system, designated ShD, for the Australian Army. This was followed by the AW Mark 1, an air-warning system for the Australian Air Force. These both operated at 200 MHz (1.5 m).

War on Japan began in December 1941, and Japanese planes attacked Darwin, Northern Territory the following February. The New South Wales Railways Engineering Group was asked by the RPL to design a lightweight antenna for the air warning radar, also known as the Worledge Aerial. LW/AW Mark I.

From this, the LW/AW Mark II resulted; about 130 of these air-transportable sets were built and used by the United States and Australian military forces in the early island landings in the South Pacific, as well as by the British in Burma.

American troops arriving in Australia in 1942–43, brought many SCR-268 radar systems with them. Most of these were turned over to the Australians, who rebuilt them to become Modified Air Warning Devices (MAWDs). These 200-MHz systems were deployed at 60 sites around Australia. During 1943–44, the RPL involved a staff of 300 persons working on 48 radar projects, many associated with improvements on the LW/AW. Height-finding was added (LW/AWH), and complex displays converted it into a ground-control intercept system (LW/GCI). There was also a unit for low-flying aircraft (LW/LFC). Near the end of the war in 1945, the RPL was working on a microwave height-finding system (LW/AWH Mark II).

=== Canada ===
After the 1939 radar briefings in Great Britain, the National Research Council of Canada (NRCC)'s Radio Section established an RDF lab under John Tasker Henderson. In 1940, a 1.5 meter surface-warning system for the Royal Canadian Navy (RCN) protected the Halifax Harbour entrance called Night Watchman.

In 1941, Research Enterprises Limited (REL)'s H. Ross Smith deployed Surface Warning 1st Canadian (SW1C), based on the Night Watchman, onboard HMCS Chambly. In 1942, a 1.4 meter system called SW2C was deployed, and a lighter version SW3C, for lighter vessels.

In 1942, a 1.5 meter coastal defense system, CD, was installed at Duncans Cove, Nova Scotia in coordination with a Canadian Army firing battalion.

Following the Tizard Mission, J.W. Bell led the REL and the Radio Section in developing the 10 centimeter GL IIIC. Housed in two trailers, one had a rotating cabin with an Accurate Position Finder. The other had a 2 meter Zone Position Indicator.

In 1943, the Radio Branch, formerly Section, built the 10 centimeter RX/C shipborne early warning system for the RCN. In 1944, the Microwave Section under K.C. Mann developed the 3 centimeter Type 268 for the Admiralty (United Kingdom).

In 1943, the 10 centimeter CDX replacement for the CD was ready for production. Also in 1943, William H. Watson designed the Microwave Early Warning Anti Submarine (MEW/AS) system, that included a slot antenna. The second version, MEW/HF, included height finding.

Overall, during the war, the NRCC's Radio Branch developed thirty radar systems, of which twelve were built by the REL.

=== New Zealand ===
In 1939 New Zealand Department of Scientific and Industrial Research (DSIR)'s Ernest Marsden was briefed on British radar development, two facilities for RDF development were established. One, led by Charles Watson-Munro) was at the Radio Section of the Central NZ Post Office in Wellington, and the other, under the responsibility of Frederick White, was at Canterbury University College in Christchurch.

The objective of the Wellington group was to develop land-based and airborne RDF sets for detecting incoming vessels and a set to assist in gun-directing at coastal batteries. Within a few months they had converted a 180-MHz (1.6-m), 1-kW transmitter from the Post Office to be pulse-modulated and used it in a system called CW (Coastal Watching). The CW was followed by a similar, improved system called CD (Coast Defense); it used a CRT for display and had lobe switching on the receiving antenna. This was placed into service at the Devonport Naval Base at Auckland. In this same period, a partially completed ASV 200-MHz set from Great Britain was made into an airborne set for the Royal New Zealand Air Force (RNZAF). About 20 sets were built and put into service. All three of these radars were placed into service before the end of 1940.

The group at Christchurch was to develop a set for shipboard detection of aircraft and other vessels, and a companion set for directing naval gunfire. This was a smaller staff and the work went much slower, but by July 1940, they had developed an experimental VHF fire-control set and tested it on the Armed Merchant Cruiser Monowai. This was then improved to become the 430 MHz (70 cm) SWG (Ship Warning, Gunnery), and in August 1941 went into service on HMNZS_Achilles and HMNZS Leander. A similar simultaneously installed system, "SW" (Ship Warning), was for air and surface protection.

Radar systems were developed from 1939; initially New Zealand made but then (because of difficulty on sourcing components) British made. Transportable GCI radar sets were deployed in the Pacific, including one with RNZAF personnel at the American aerodrome at Henderson Field, Guadalcanal in September 1942, where the American SCR 270-B sets could not plot heights so were inadequate against frequent Japanese night raids. In the first half of 1943 additional New Zealand radar units and staff were sent to the Pacific at the request of COMSOPAC, Admiral Halsey.

=== South Africa ===
Like in Great Britain, RDF (radar) development in South Africa emerged from a research organization centering on lightning instrumentation: the Bernard Price Institute (BPI) for Geophysical Research, a unit of the University of the Witwatersrand in Johannesburg. When Prime Minister Jan Smuts was told of this new technology, he requested that the resources of BPI be devoted to this effort for the duration of the war. Basil Schonland, a world-recognized authority on lightning detection and analysis, was appointed to head the effort.

By the end of 1939, using Frederick Terman's Radio Engineering and the ARRL handbook, Schonland, Guerino P. Gane, Guerino R. Bozzoli, W. Eric Phillips, and Noel Roberts built the JB. The transmitter operated at 90 MHz (3.3 m) and had a power of about 500 W. The pulse was 20-μs in width and the PRF was 50 Hz, synchronized with the power-line. The receiver was super-regenerative, using type 955 and 956 Acorn tubes in the front end and a 9-MHz IF amplifier. Separate, rotatable antennas with stacked pairs of full-wave dipoles were used for transmitting and receiving. The beams were about 30 degrees wide, but the azimuth of the reflected signal was determined more precisely by using a goniometer. Pulses were displayed on the CRT of a commercial oscilloscope. In March 1940, the system was deployed to Kenya.

An improved system, designated JB-3, was built at the BPI; the most important changes were the use of a transmit-receive device (a duplexer) allowing a common antenna, and an increase in frequency to 120 MHz (2.5 m). The range increased to 150 km for aircraft and 30 km for small ships, with a bearing accuracy of 1–2 degrees. Twelve sets of JB-3 radars began deployment around the South African coast in June 1941.

By mid-1942, British radars were available to meet all new South African needs. Thus, no further developments were made at the BPI. Most of the staff joined the military. Basil Schonland, as a Lt. Colonel in the South African Army, went to Great Britain to serve as Superintendent of the Army Operational Research Group and later the scientific advisor to Field Marshal Bernard Montgomery.

== See also ==
- History of radar

== Sources ==
- Baroni, Piero (2007). La guerra dei radar : il suicidio dell'Italia : 1935/1943 (in Italian). Milano: Greco & Greco. ISBN 978-8879804318.
- Galati, Gaspare (2016). "Chapter 2. The Owls and the Gufo. Birth of Italian Radar". 100 Years of Radar (PDF). doi:10.1007/978-3-319-00584-3_2. ISBN 978-3-319-00584-3.
- Pope, Dudley (1998). Flag 4 : the battle of Coastal Forces in the Mediterranean 1939–1945. London: Chatham. ISBN 1-86176-067-1.
- Preston, Antony; Ando, Elio (1978). "Capitani Romani". Warship. 5: 155.
- Romano, Salvatore (1997-07-26). "History of the development of radar technology in Italy".
- Werrell, K. P. (2020). Blind Bombing: How Microwave Radar Brought the Allies to D-Day and Victory in World War II. Air Power History, 67(3) https://link.gale.com/apps/doc/A660176518/AONE?u=txshracd2501&sid=ebsco&xid=68d1ece1
