= Oshchepkov =

Oshchepkov (Russian: Още́пков), female form Oshchepkova (Russian: Още́пкова), is a Russian surname. Notable people with this surname include:

- Pavel K. Oshchepkov (1908–1992), Russian physicist
- Stepan Oshchepkov (1934–2012), Russian sprint canoer
- Vasili Oshchepkov (1893–1938), Russian martial arts specialist
