= Wilhelm Runge =

German electrical engineer and physicist (1895–1987)

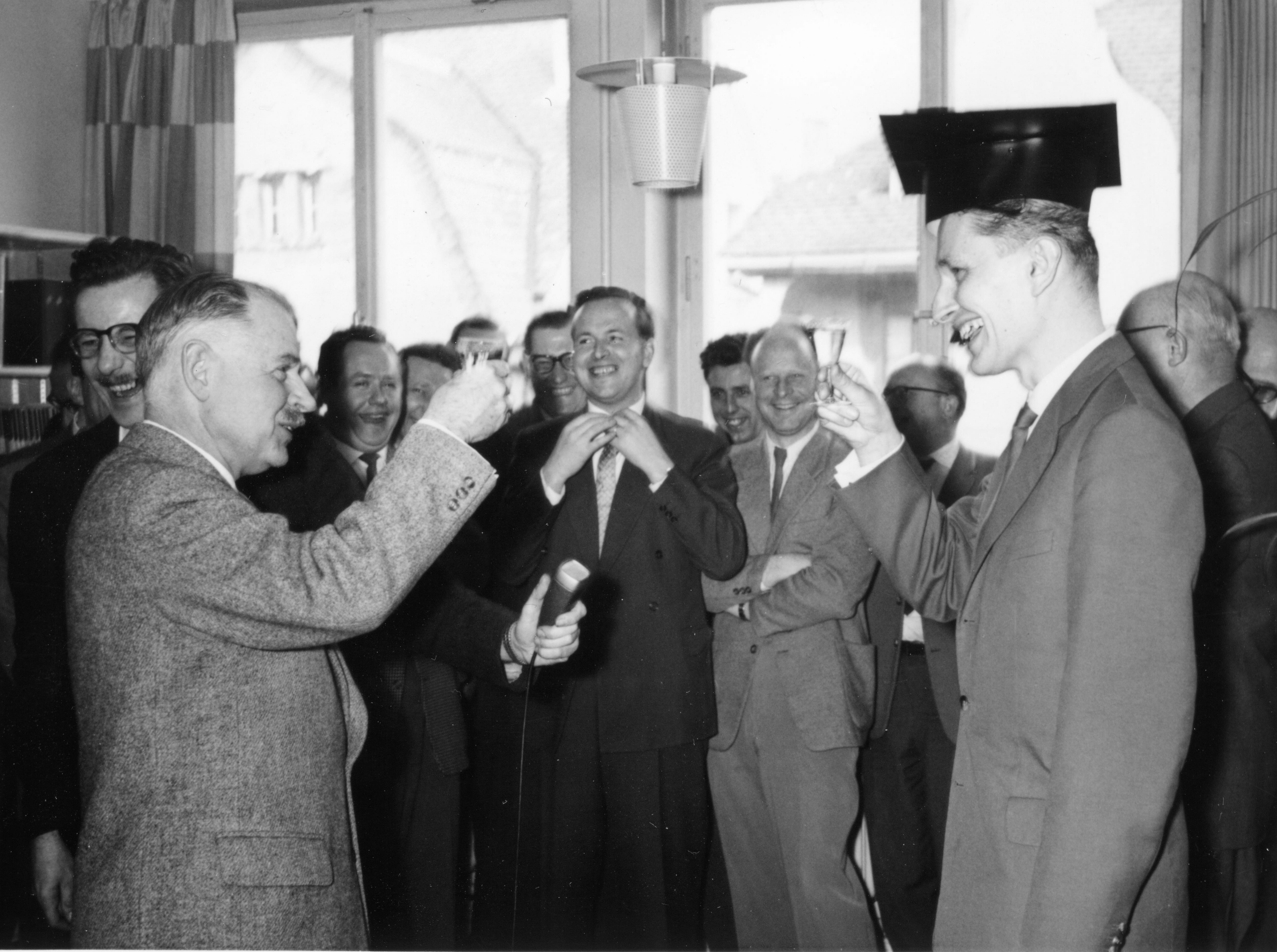

Wilhelm Tolmé Runge (10 June 1895 – 9 June 1987) was a German electrical engineer and physicist who had a major involvement in developing radar systems in Germany.

== Early life ==
Wilhelm Runge was born and raised in Hanover, where his father, Carl Runge, was a well-known professor of mathematics at the Technische Hochschule Hannover (now remembered chiefly as the co-eponym of the Runge–Kutta method).

== Military service ==
When World War I started in 1914, Runge was not doing well in his engineering studies. In 1915 he volunteered to join the German Army. Unsuccessful in officer training, he was sent to the Western Front and the infamous trench warfare. By early 1917 he had reached the rank of Sergeant and was rescued from likely death by being selected by Lieutenant Richard Courant – a mathematician friend of his father who later married his sister, Nina – to go to German-occupied northern France and assist in developing the earth telegraph (German: Erdtelegraphenapparat), a seismic apparatus.

== Education ==
At the close of the war, Runge, now highly motivated by his adverse military experience, returned to academic studies. He eventually earned the Doctor of Engineering (Electrical) degree from the Technical University at Darmstadt, and was later in life also awarded the higher academic degree (the Habilitation) in physics from the University of Göttingen. In 1923, while pursuing his academic studies, he started working at Telefunken, and in 1926, joined their development laboratory in Berlin.

== Radar Research ==
At Telefunken's development laboratory, Runge experimented with high-frequency transmitters and had the tube department working on cm-wavelength devices. In the summer of 1935, Runge, now Director of Telefunken's Radio Research Laboratory, initiated an internally funded project in radio-based detection technology. A-50 cm (600-MHz) receiver and 0.5-W transmitter were built, both using Barkhausen–Kurz tubes. With the antennas placed flat on the ground some distance apart, he arranged for an aircraft to fly overhead and found that the receiver gave a strong Doppler-beat interference signal. Telefunken made sure to publicize their work in international media.

Runge, with Hans Hollmann as a consultant, then developed a 1.8-m (170-MHz) system using pulse-modulation. Wilhelm Stepp, an engineer on the research staff, designed a transmit-receive device (a duplexer) for allowing a common antenna. Stepp also code-named the system Darmstadt after his home town, starting the practice in Telefunken of naming systems after cities. The Darmstadt, with only a few watts transmitter power, was first tested in February 1936, detecting an aircraft at about 5-km (3-mi) distance. This led the Luftwaffe (German Air Force) to fund Telefunken for the development of a 50-cm (600-MHz) gun laying system, the Würzburg.

== Development for military uses ==
Telefunken received a contract from the Luftwaffe in late 1938 to build the Würzburg for supporting anti-aircraft guns. The transmitter had a 2-μs pulse width and a pulse repetition frequency (PRF) of about 4 kHz; the antenna used a 3-m parabolic reflector built by the Zeppelin Company. The Würzburg was demonstrated to Adolf Hitler in July 1939. Runge was justifiably proud of this system; it came to be the primary mobile, gun-laying system used by the Luftwaffe and the Heer (German Army) during World War II.

In early 1941, the Luftverteidigung (Air Defense) recognized the need for Funkmessgerät on their night-fighter aircraft. The requirements were given to Runge at Telefunken, and by the summer a prototype system was tested. Code-named Lichtenstein, this was a 62-cm (485-MHz), 1.5-kW system, generally based on the technology now well established by Telefunken for the Würzburg.

The Lichtenstein had a 200-m minimum range, essential for the Freya radar and Würzburg radar systems of fighter direction, and a 4-km maximum range. The first production models became available from Telefunken in February 1942.

== Sabotage ==
In 1934, Runge confessed to his old friend and British spy Winthrop Bell, that he had been sabotaging German radar advances. Runge had been an intelligence asset for Bell when he was first inserted into Germany in 1919. Before the Nazis classified Telefunken's research, Runge published it to make sure the entire world had access to German technology, eliminating the Nazi's advantage. He also slowed progress by creating two separate radar research tracks, one within Telefunken under Hermann Göring's purview and the other under the navy.

When the great advance of centimetre wave radar neared, Runge argued that it was impractical and insured that research was defunded in 1942. In February 1943, when the Germans shot down a British Stirling bomber they were shocked to realize it had functioning centimetric radar. Heinrich Himmler demanded an investigation after several engineers at Telefunken became suspicious. Runge was able to convince Göring that his team's inability to develop the technology was due to incompetence. Moreover, he bluffed Göring that British submarines could not possibly be using centimetric radar. Göring never told his counterparts in the German Navy about the discovery. Meanwhile, the Royal Navy were in fact using the new technology and devastating the U-boat fleet.

== Aviation research ==
In 1943, Runge was appointed to head the Luftfahrtforschungsanstalt (Aviation Research Institute) in Braunschweig. At the close of World War II in May 1945, he returned to Telefunken, which was located in the West Berlin occupied area. Here he spent the next several years in rebuilding the engineering department. In 1955, Runge was awarded the Habilitation (higher academic degree), earning him the title of Professor. Until his retirement in 1963, he established and managed the Telefunken Research Institute in Ulm.

== General references ==
- Brown, Louis (1999). A Radar History of World War II. Inst. of Physics Publishing. ISBN 0-7503-0659-9.
- Muller, Werner (1998). Ground Radar Systems of the German Luftwaffe to 1945. Schiffer Publishing, Ltd. ISBN 0-7643-0567-0.
- Swords, Seán S (1986). Technical History of the Beginnings of Radar. Peter Peregrinus Ltd. ISBN 0-86341-043-X.
- Watson, Raymond C. Jr (2009). Radar Origins Worldwide. Trafford Publishers. ISBN 978-1-4269-2110-0.
- Literature by and about Wilhelm Tolmé Runge in the catalog of the German National Library
