= Japanese destroyer Makigumo =

Three naval vessels of Japan have been named Makigumo (巻雲), meaning "Cirrus Clouds" (Rolling Clouds).

- Japanese destroyer Makigumo (1905) was a Shikinami-class destroyer in the Imperial Japanese Navy. Originally, she was a Kazarsky-class torpedo cruiser Vsadnik of the Imperial Russian Navy.
- Japanese destroyer Makigumo (1941) was a Yūgumo-class destroyer in the Imperial Japanese Navy. She was completed in 1942, scuttled in 1943, and struck in 1943.
- JDS Makigumo (DD-114) was a Yamagumo-class destroyer in the Japanese Maritime Self-Defense Force. She was launched in 1967 and decommissioned in 1995.
