= Pavel Oshchepkov =

Russian physicist

- Born: Pavel Kondratyevich Oshchepkov; June 24, 1908; Zuevy Klyuchi, Sarapulsky Uyezd, Vyatka Governorate, Russian Empire
- Died: December 1, 1992 (aged 84); Russia
- Education: Plekhanov Russian University of Economics
- Occupation: Physicist

Pavel Kondratyevich Oshchepkov (Russian: Павел Кондратьевич Ощепков; 24 June 1908 – 1 December 1992) was a Soviet physicist who had a leading role in the development of radio-location (radar) in the USSR. During the Great Purge he was sent to a Gulag labor camp for 10 years. Upon release, he began a new life and gained recognition in other scientific areas.

== Career and accomplishments ==
Pavel Oshchepkov was born in the village of Zuevy Klyuchi. A child of the Russian Revolution and the associated strife in life, he lost his parents and, uneducated, roamed the streets until he was 12. He was then placed in school at the Shalashinsk Commune where he first learned to read. By 1928 he was able to enter the Plekhanov Russian University of Economics in Moscow to study economics of electrical power. His early performance there was excellent, and he was allowed to transfer to Moscow University, where in 1931 he completed his undergraduate education in the physics curriculum.

=== Pre-internment ===
Upon graduation, Oshchepkov was employed as an electrical engineer in a power station, but before the end of 1932, was on the Moscow engineering staff of the Voiska Protivo-vozdushnoi aborony (PVO, Air Defense Forces) of the Red Army. Assigned to work on improving optical instruments for aircraft detection, his technical and leadership abilities were quickly recognized.

Engineers at the PVO came up with the concept of radiolokatory (radio location) for extending the reconnaissance range, and Oshchepkov was assigned to prepare a paper for the Defense Commissar, asking that a special research unit be set up for a razvedyvlatl’naya elektromagnitnaya stantsiya (reconnaissance electromagnetic station). The proposal was accepted, and in June 1933, Oshchepkov was transferred to Leningrad to be in charge of a Special Construction Bureau (SCB), as well as being responsible for the related experino-tekknicheskii sektor (technical expertise component) of the PVO.

Most of the work at other organization concerned radio location using continuous waves, with interference of transmitted and reflected signals to indicate a target. At the SCB, Oshchepkov worked with scientists at the Leningrad Physico-Technical Institute (LPTI) on a pulsed system, the first in the USSR. His work was closely followed by Abram Ioffe, Scientific Director of the LPTI and generally considered the leading physicist at that time in the nation.

In April 1937, initial tests of Oshchepkov’s pulsed radio-location system resulted in detecting an aircraft at a range of about 17 km (11 mi). The system, however, could not yet directly measure range (distance) to the target, a firm requirement for detection systems that would later be called radar.

Although Oshchepkov had a good plan for completing his system, he was not allowed to carry this out. In June 1937, the Great Purge swept over the military high commands and the supporting scientific community. Hundreds of thousands of victims were falsely accused of various political crimes, with a large number executed. Oshchepkov was charged with “high crimes” and sentenced to 10 years at a Gulag penal labor camp. Ioffe pleaded without success for Oshchepkov to be restored. Over the years of Oshchepkov’s internment, Ioffe assisted in his survival by providing food packages and letters of encouragement.

=== Post-internment ===
Oshchepkov was released from the Gulag camp in 1946. Returning to academic studies, he eventually earned both the Candidate of Sciences (C.Sc. — approximately the same as the Ph.D.) degree and the Doctor of Sciences (Sc.D., habilitation in the West) degree. He never returned to radar research, but found entirely new avenues for his creativity: material science and thermal physics.

From 1964 to 1968, Oshchepkov headed the Introscopy Research Institute, under which he led in creating the new science and technology of introscopy — non-destructive testing using the full radiation spectrum.

In the final years of Oshchepkov's life, he focused on the concept of entropy, exploring innovative methods of utilizing energy. He founded the Public Institute of Energy Inversion, which was based on the principle that "energy cannot be destroyed, but it can be dissipated; energy cannot be created, but it can be collected." In this, his theories were considered highly “off center,” and were criticized by the academic community.

== Recognitions ==
- Given the rank of Honored Figure of Science and Techniques RSFSR and Honored Inventor RSFSR
- Rewarded with the Order of Lenin, the Order of the October Revolution, and Order of the Red Banner of Labour.
- Was an honorable member of a number of domestic and foreign science-technical societies.

== Sources ==
- Chernyak, V. S., I. Ya. Immoreev, and B. M. Vovshin; “Radar in the Soviet Union and Russia: A Brief Historical Outline,” IEEE AES Magazine, Vol. 19, December, p. 8, 2003
- Erickson, John; “Radio-location and the air defense problem: The design and development of Soviet Radar 1934-40,” Social Studies of Science, Vol. 2, p. 241, 1972
- Kostenko, A. A., A. I. Nosich., and I. A. Tishchenko; “Radar Prehistory, Soviet Side,” Proceedings of IEEE APS International Symposium 2001, Vol. 4, p. 44, 2002
- Siddiqi, Asif A.; “Rockets Red Glare: Technology, Conflict, and Terror in the Soviet Union," Technology & Culture, Vol. 44, p. 470, 2003
- Watson, Raymond C., Jr.; Radar Origins Worldwide, Trafford Publishing, 2009
